= 2018–19 WCBA season =

- League: Women's Chinese Basketball Association
- Sport: Basketball
- Duration: 18 October 2018–19 January 2019; 13 February–4 March 2019 (Playoffs); 13–23 March 2019 (Finals)
- Games: 34
- Teams: 18

Regular season
- Top seed: Guangdong Vermilion Birds

Playoffs
- Finals champions: Guangdong Vermilion Birds
- Runners-up: Bayi Kylin
- Finals MVP: Li Yueru

Seasons
- ← 2017–18 2019–20 →

The 2018–19 WCBA season was the 17th season of the Women's Chinese Basketball Association. Beijing Great Wall were the defending champions. The league was expanded from 14 teams to 18 teams.

== Foreign Players ==
Team	Player	Replaced During Season
Bayi Kylin	–	–
Beijing Great Wall	(United States) Tina Charles	(United States) Morgan Tuck
Fujian Zoten	(United States) Alicia DeVaughn	–
Guangdong Vermilion Birds	(United States) Nneka Ogwumike	(United States) Aerial Powers
Hebei Win Power	(United States) Jessica Breland	(United States) Azurá Stevens
Heilongjiang Dragons	(United States) Monique Billings	–
Henan Phoenix	(United States) Stefanie Dolson	–
Jiangsu Phoenix	(United States) Bernice Mosby	(Canada) Natalie Achonwa
Liaoning Flying Eagles	(United States) Rachel Hollivay	(United States) Imani McGee-Stafford
Shaanxi Red Wolves	(United States) Theresa Plaisance	(United States) A'ja Wilson
Shandong Golden Stars	(United States) DeWanna Bonner	–
Shanghai Swordfish	(Serbia) Jelena Dubljević	–
Shanxi Flame	(United States) Courtney Paris	(United States) Quanitra Hollingsworth (United States) Diamond DeShields
Sichuan Blue Whales	(Belarus) Yelena Leuchanka	–
Wuhan Shengfan	(United States) Amber Harris	–
Tianjin Guanlan	(United States) Leisha Small	–
Xinjiang Magic Deer	(United States) Glory Johnson	(United States) Natasha Howard (The Bahamas) Waltiea Rolle
Zhejiang Golden Bulls	(United States) Alaina Coates	–

== Standings ==
#	2018–19 WCBA season					
#	Team	W	L	PCT	Pts	Tiebreaker
1	Guangdong Vermilion Birds	32	2	.941	66	
2	Bayi Kylin	31	3	.912	65	
3	Jiangsu Phoenix	28	6	.824	62	
4	Xinjiang Magic Deer	28	6	.824	62	
5	Beijing Great Wall	24	10	.706	58	
6	Shandong Golden Stars	23	11	.676	57	
7	Shanghai Swordfish	20	14	.588	54	
8	Shanxi Flame	18	16	.529	52	
9	Sichuan Blue Whales	17	17	.500	51	
10	Henan Phoenix	16	18	.471	50	
11	Heilongjiang Dragons	13	21	.382	47	
12	Hebei Win Power	12	22	.353	46	
13	Shaanxi Red Wolves	11	23	.324	45	
14	Liaoning Flying Eagles	11	23	.324	45	
15	Zhejiang Golden Bulls	9	25	.264	43	
16	Fujian Zoten	8	26	.235	42	
17	Tianjin Guanlan	3	31	.088	37	
18	Wuhan Shengfan	2	32	.059	36	

== Playoffs ==
First Round
1	Guangdong Vermilion Birds	3
8	Shanxi Flame	0
4	Xinjiang Magic Deer	1
5	Beijing Great Wall	3
3	Jiangsu Phoenix	3
6	Shandong Golden Stars	1
2	Bayi Kylin	3
7	Shanghai Swordfish	0

Semifinals
1	Guangdong Vermilion Birds	3
5	Beijing Great Wall	0
3	Jiangsu Phoenix	0
2	Bayi Kylin	3

Finals
1	Guangdong Vermilion Birds	3
2	Bayi Kylin	2

- Bold Series winner
- Italics Team with home-court advantage

== Venues ==
Team	Home city	Arena	Capacity
Bayi Kylin	Nanchang	Nanchang International Sports Center Gymnasium	N/A
Beijing Great Wall	Beijing	Shougang Basketball Center	N/A
Guangdong Dolphins	Dongguan	Dalang Arena	4,000
Guangdong Dolphins	Shenzhen	Bao'an Gymnasium	N/A
Heilongjiang Dragons	Daqing	Daqing Gymnasium	N/A
Heilongjiang Dragons	Harbin	Heilongjiang University Gymnasium	N/A
Jiangsu Phoenix	Nanjing	Jiangning Sports Center Gymnasium	5,500
Liaoning Flying Eagles	Anshan	Angang Gymnasium	N/A
Shaanxi Red Wolves	Weinan	Weinan Sports Center Gymnasium	N/A
Shandong Six Stars	Penglai	Penglai Gymnasium	N/A
Shanghai Swordfish	Shanghai	Baoshan Sports Center Gymnasium	N/A
Shanxi Flame	Taiyuan	Shanxi Sports Centre Gymnasium	N/A
Shenyang Army Golden Lions	Dandong	Dandong Sports Centre Gymnasium	N/A
Sichuan Blue Whales	Chengdu	Wenjiang Gymnasium	N/A
Xinjiang Magic Deer	Ürümqi	Xinjiang Sports Centre Gymnasium	N/A
Zhejiang Golden Bulls	Yiwu	Meihu Arena	6,000
