= 2017–18 WCBA season =

WCBA
- Season: 2017–18
- Duration: November 13, 2017 – January 17, 2018 (regular season） January 24, 2018 – March 5, 2018 (Playoffs); March 10, 2018 – March 14, 2018 (Finals)
- Games played: 26
- Teams: 14

Regular season
- Top seed: Beijing Great Wall

Finals
- Champions: Beijing Great Wall
- Runners-up: Shanxi Flame
- Semi-finalists: Guangdong Dolphins; Shanghai Swordfish

The 2017–18 WCBA season was the 16th season of the Women's Chinese Basketball Association.

The regular season began on Monday, November 13, 2017 and ended on Wednesday, January 17, 2018. Beijing Great Wall topped the regular season standings with a 21–5 record, having won the previous two WCBA titles. The playoffs began on Wednesday, January 24, 2018 and ended on Wednesday, March 14, 2018.

Beijing swept Shanxi Flame 3–0 in the best-of-five WCBA finals, clinching an 85–63 home victory in the deciding game on March 14 at the Shougang Basketball Center to secure their third consecutive title. Center Sylvia Fowles helped Beijing pull away with a 10–0 run in the second quarter, while guard Shao Ting's three-pointers had earlier given the team an early lead. New head coach Zhang Yun credited former coach Xu Limin, saying he "laid the foundation of the team in the last 12 years."

== Venues ==
Team	Home city	Arena	Capacity
Bayi Kylin	Nanchang	Nanchang International Sports Center Gymnasium	N/A
Beijing Great Wall	Beijing	Shougang Basketball Center	N/A
Guangdong Dolphins	Dongguan	Dalang Arena	4,000
Guangdong Dolphins	Shenzhen	Bao'an Gymnasium	N/A
Heilongjiang Dragons	Daqing	Daqing Gymnasium	N/A
Heilongjiang Dragons	Harbin	Heilongjiang University Gymnasium	N/A
Jiangsu Phoenix	Nanjing	Jiangning Sports Center Gymnasium	5,500
Liaoning Flying Eagles	Anshan	Angang Gymnasium	N/A
Shaanxi Red Wolves	Weinan	Weinan Sports Center Gymnasium	N/A
Shandong Six Stars	Penglai	Penglai Gymnasium	N/A
Shanghai Swordfish	Shanghai	Baoshan Sports Center Gymnasium	N/A
Shanxi Flame	Taiyuan	Shanxi Sports Centre Gymnasium	N/A
Shenyang Army Golden Lions	Dandong	Dandong Sports Centre Gymnasium	N/A
Sichuan Jinqiang Blue Whales	Chengdu	Wenjiang Gymnasium	N/A
Xinjiang Magic Deer	Ürümqi	Xinjiang Sports Centre Gymnasium	N/A
Zhejiang Chouzhou Bank Golden Bulls	Yiwu	Meihu Arena	6,000

== Foreign Players ==
Team	Player	Replaced During Season
Bayi Kylin	–	–
Beijing Great Wall	(United States) Sylvia Fowles	(United States) Imani Boyette
Guangdong Dolphins	(United States) Glory Johnson	(United States) Amber Harris
Heilongjiang Dragons	(Jamaica) Aneika Henry	–
Jiangsu Phoenix	(Russia) Viktoria Medvedeva	–
Liaoning Flying Eagles	(United States) Elizabeth Williams	–
Shaanxi Red Wolves	(United States) Morgan Tuck	–
Shandong Six Stars	(United States) Lynetta Kizer	–
Shanghai Swordfish	(United States) Breanna Stewart	–
Shanxi Flame	(The Bahamas) Jonquel Jones	–
Shenyang Army Golden Lions	–	–
Sichuan Jinqiang Blue Whales	(Belarus) Yelena Leuchanka	–
Xinjiang Magic Deer	(United States) Candace Parker	(United States) Tina Charles
Zhejiang Chouzhou Bank Golden Bulls	(United States) Natasha Howard	–

Ahead of the season's semifinal round, Jonquel Jones of Shanxi Flame led the league in scoring and rebounding, averaging 28.8 points and 18.3 rebounds per game, while Sylvia Fowles of Beijing Great Wall averaged 20.7 points and 12.3 rebounds.

== Regular Season Standings ==
#	2017–18 WCBA season					
#	Team	W	L	PCT	Pts	Tiebreaker
1	Beijing Great Wall	21	5	.808	47	
2	Xinjiang Magic Deer	20	6	.769	46	
3	Shanxi Flame	19	7	.731	45	
4	Shanghai Swordfish	18	8	.692	44	
5	Jiangsu Phoenix	15	11	.577	41	
6	Heilongjiang Dragons	15	11	.577	41	
7	Guangdong Dolphins	13	13	.500	39	
8	Zhejiang Chouzhou Bank Golden Bulls	12	14	.462	38	
9	Sichuan Jinqiang Blue Whales	11	15	.423	37	
10	Bayi Kylin	10	16	.385	36	
11	Liaoning Flying Eagles	9	17	.346	35	
12	Shandong Six Stars	8	18	.308	34	
13	Shenyang Army Golden Lions	8	18	.308	34	
14	Shaanxi Red Wolves	3	23	.115	29	

Key to colors
Top 8 teams advance to the Playoffs

== Playoffs ==
The 2018 WCBA Playoffs began on January 24, 2018.

First round 24 January–3 February
1	Beijing Great Wall	3
8	Zhejiang Chouzhou Bank Golden Bulls	1
4	Shanghai Swordfish	3
5	Jiangsu Phoenix	0
2	Xinjiang Magic Deer	1
7	Guangdong Dolphins	3
3	Shanxi Flame	3
6	Heilongjiang Dragons	0

Semifinals
1	Beijing Great Wall	3
4	Shanghai Swordfish	0
7	Guangdong Dolphins	0
3	Shanxi Flame	3

Finals
1	Beijing Great Wall	3
3	Shanxi Flame	0

- Bold Series winner, advanced to the next round
- Italics Team with home-court advantage

The numbers to the left of each team indicate the team's seeding, and the numbers to the right indicate the number of games the team won in that round.

Beijing Great Wall defeated Shanxi Flame 3–0 in the finals to win their third consecutive WCBA title, the third time in league history a team achieved a three-peat.
