= List of 2018–19 WCBA season transactions =

This is a list of transactions that have taken place during the off-season and the 2018–19 WCBA season.

== Front office movements ==
=== Head coach changes ===
Off-season

Departure date	Team	Outgoing head coach	Reason for departure	Hire date	Incoming head coach	Last coaching position	Ref.
	TBA						

== Player movement ==
=== Free agency ===
Player	Date signed	New team	Former team	Ref
(Montenegro) Jelena Dubljević	June 13	Shanghai Swordfish	Galatasaray S.K. (TUR)	
(United States) A'ja Wilson	August 1	Shanxi Flame	South Carolina Gamecocks (USA)	
(United States) Monique Billings	August 15	Heilongjiang Dragons	UCLA Bruins (USA)	
(United States) DeWanna Bonner	August 27	Shandong Six Stars	USK Praha (CZE)	
(United States) Natasha Howard	August 27	Xinjiang Magic Deer	Zhejiang Golden Bulls	

=== Going overseas ===
Player	Date signed	New team	Former team	Ref
(United States) Breanna Stewart	June 22	Dynamo Kursk (RUS)	Shanghai Swordfish	
(United States) Elizabeth Williams	August 2	Botaş SK (TUR)	Liaoning Flying Eagles	
(Jamaica) Aneika Henry	August 4	OGM Orman Spor Ankara (TUR)	Heilongjiang Dragons	
(The Bahamas) Jonquel Jones	August 23	UMMC Ekaterinburg (RUS)	Shanxi Flame	
(United States) Glory Johnson	August 24	Hatay BŞB (TUR)	Guangdong Dolphins	

== See also ==
- 2018–19 WCBA season
- List of 2018–19 WCBA team rosters
