= 2021 FIBA Women's Asia Cup squads =

This article displays the rosters for the teams competing at the 2021 FIBA Women's Asia Cup. Each team had to submit 12 players.

Age and club as of 27 September 2021.

== Division A ==
=== Group A ===
==== India ====
The roster was announced on 15 September 2021.

India women's national basketball team roster
Players
Coaches

Pos.	No.	Name	Age – Date of birth	Height	Club	Ctr.
SG	4	Vaishnavi Yadav	19 – 10 October 2001	1.72 m (5 ft 8 in)	Uttar Pradesh	(India)
SG	5	Shruthi Arvind	25 – 21 February 1996	1.71 m (5 ft 7 in)	Railways	(India)
C	6	Stephy Nixon	29 – 6 June 1992	1.85 m (6 ft 1 in)	KSEB	(India)
PF	8	Sathiya Senthil	24 – 12 June 1997	1.80 m (5 ft 11 in)	Railways	(India)
PF	10	Navaneetha Pattemane	27 – 28 July 1994	1.78 m (5 ft 10 in)	Railways	(India)
SF	11	Sreekala Rani	20 – 19 January 2001	1.75 m (5 ft 9 in)	Kerala	(India)
C	13	Anumaria Chenganamattathil	20 – 15 May 2001	1.82 m (6 ft 0 in)	Kerala	(India)
F	14	Shireen Limaye	26 – 13 February 1995	1.78 m (5 ft 10 in)	Railways	(India)
SF	16	Sahana Shivamogga	19 – 17 August 2002	1.75 m (5 ft 9 in)	Karnataka	(India)
SG	18	Pushpa Senthil	20 – 18 September 2001	1.78 m (5 ft 10 in)	Railways	(India)
PG	19	Madhu Kamari	26 – 9 July 1995	1.64 m (5 ft 5 in)	Railways	(India)
PG	25	Nishanthi Masilamani	21 – 14 October 1999	1.69 m (5 ft 7 in)	Railways	(India)

Head coach

- (Serbia) Zoran Višić

Assistant coach(es)

- (India) Meenalatha Mohan
- (India) Hiranya Murthy

Legend

- Club – describes last
  club before the tournament
- Age – describes age
  on 27 September 2021

==== Japan ====
A 13-player roster was announced on 10 September 2021.

Japan women's national basketball team roster
Players
Coaches

Pos.	No.	Name	Age – Date of birth	Height	Club
PF	3	Stephanie Mawuli	22 – 25 November 1998	1.82 m (6 ft 0 in)	Toyota Antelopes	(Japan)
C	18	Risa Nishioka	24 – 3 March 1997	1.86 m (6 ft 1 in)	Mitsubishi Electric Koalas	(Japan)
SG	20	Nanaka Todo	20 – 29 November 2000	1.74 m (5 ft 9 in)	Toyota Boshoku Sunshine Rabbits	(Japan)
PG	21	Moe Nagata	24 – 20 June 1997	1.74 m (5 ft 9 in)	Toyota Antelopes	(Japan)
PG	23	Mai Yamamoto	21 – 23 October 1999	1.65 m (5 ft 5 in)	Toyota Antelopes	(Japan)
SG	27	Saki Hayashi	26 – 16 March 1995	1.73 m (5 ft 8 in)	JX-Eneos Sunflowers	(Japan)
PG	32	Saori Miyazaki	26 – 27 August 1995	1.67 m (5 ft 6 in)	JX-Eneos Sunflowers	(Japan)
PF	33	Tamami Nakada	23 – 21 December 1997	1.83 m (6 ft 0 in)	JX-Eneos Sunflowers	(Japan)
SG	41	Haruno Nemoto	26 – 18 April 1995	1.76 m (5 ft 9 in)	Mitsubishi Electric Koalas	(Japan)
SF	81	Kiho Miyashita	22 – 6 October 1998	1.79 m (5 ft 10 in)	Toyota Antelopes	(Japan)
SF	88	Himawari Akaho	23 – 28 August 1998	1.85 m (6 ft 1 in)	Denso Iris	(Japan)
PF	99	Monica Okoye	22 – 7 February 1999	1.82 m (6 ft 0 in)	Fujitsu Red Wave	(Japan)

Head coach

- (Japan) Toru Ontsuka

Assistant coach(es)

- (Japan) Yoshikazu Suzuki
- (Japan) Tsuneo Ueno

Legend

- Club – describes last
  club before the tournament
- Age – describes age
  on 27 September 2021

==== New Zealand ====
A 14-player roster was announced on 30 August 2021.

New Zealand women's national basketball team roster
Players
Coaches

Pos.	No.	Name	Age – Date of birth	Height	Club	Ctr.
F	1	Mary Goulding	25 – 24 August 1996	1.83 m (6 ft 0 in)	Bendigo Spirit	(Australia)
F	3	Ashley Taia	26 – 22 November 1994	1.83 m (6 ft 0 in)	Wetterbygden	(Sweden)
PG	4	Krystal Leger-Walker	23 – 29 September 1997	1.75 m (5 ft 9 in)	Waikato Wizards	(New Zealand)
SG	5	Charlisse Leger-Walker	20 – 15 September 2001	1.78 m (5 ft 10 in)	Washington State Cougars	(United States)
PF	6	Tessa Boagni	25 – 12 February 1996	1.88 m (6 ft 2 in)	Canterbury Wildcats	(New Zealand)
SF	7	Ashleigh Karaitiana	29 – 26 June 1992	1.83 m (6 ft 0 in)	Southern District Spartans	(Australia)
SG	8	Brooke Blair	26 – 8 October 1994	1.73 m (5 ft 8 in)	Rockhampton Rockets & Cyclones	(Australia)
SG	10	Chevannah Paalvast	30 – 4 September 1991	1.80 m (5 ft 11 in)	Bendigo Spirit	(Australia)
C	12	Penina Davidson	26 – 2 September 1995	1.91 m (6 ft 3 in)	Melbourne Boomers	(Australia)
PG	23	Lauryn Hippolite	21 – 5 March 2000	1.74 m (5 ft 9 in)	Canterbury Wildcats	(New Zealand)
F	24	Zoe Richards	23 – 4 October 1997	1.86 m (6 ft 1 in)	Otago Gold Rush	(New Zealand)
PF	32	Kalani Purcell	26 – 13 January 1995	1.88 m (6 ft 2 in)	Sydney Uni Flames	(Australia)

Head coach

- (Australia) Guy Molloy

Assistant coach(es)

- (Australia) Jody Cameron

Legend

- Club – describes last
  club before the tournament
- Age – describes age
  on 27 September 2021

==== South Korea ====
The roster was announced on 3 September 2021.

South Korea women's national basketball team roster
Players
Coaches

Pos.	No.	Name	Age – Date of birth	Height	Club	Ctr.
PG	1	Shin Ji-hyun	26 – 12 September 1995	1.73 m (5 ft 8 in)	Bucheon Hana 1Q	(South Korea)
G	4	Yoon Ye-bin	24 – 16 April 1997	1.80 m (5 ft 11 in)	Samsung Life Blueminx	(South Korea)
PG	5	An He-ji	24 – 12 February 1997	1.64 m (5 ft 5 in)	Busan BNK Sum	(South Korea)
PF	6	Choi Eun-sil	27 – 17 August 1994	1.83 m (6 ft 0 in)	Asan Woori Bank Wibee	(South Korea)
G	7	Park Hye-jin	31 – 22 July 1990	1.78 m (5 ft 10 in)	Asan Woori Bank Wibee	(South Korea)
F	8	Kim Min-jeong	27 – 3 May 1994	1.82 m (6 ft 0 in)	Cheongju KB Stars	(South Korea)
F	9	Park Ji-hyun	21 – 7 April 2000	1.85 m (6 ft 1 in)	Asan Woori Bank Wibee	(South Korea)
F	11	Kang Lee-seul	27 – 5 April 1994	1.80 m (5 ft 11 in)	Cheongju KB Stars	(South Korea)
C	13	Yang In-young	26 – 13 March 1995	1.84 m (6 ft 0 in)	Bucheon Hana 1Q	(South Korea)
C	20	Bae Hye-yoon	32 – 10 June 1989	1.82 m (6 ft 0 in)	Samsung Life Blueminx	(South Korea)
F	23	Kim Dan-bi	31 – 27 February 1990	1.80 m (5 ft 11 in)	Incheon S-Birds	(South Korea)
F	27	Jin An	25 – 23 March 1996	1.82 m (6 ft 0 in)	Busan BNK Sum	(South Korea)

Head coach

- (South Korea) Jung Sun-min

Assistant coach(es)

- (South Korea) Choi Youn-ah

Legend

- Club – describes last
  club before the tournament
- Age – describes age
  on 27 September 2021

=== Group B ===
==== Australia ====
The roster was announced on 1 September 2021.

Australia women's national basketball team roster
Players
Coaches

Pos.	No.	Name	Age – Date of birth	Height	Club	Ctr.
G	4	Sami Whitcomb	33 – 20 July 1988	1.78 m (5 ft 10 in)	New York Liberty	(United States)
PG	6	Tiana Mangakahia	26 – 21 April 1995	1.65 m (5 ft 5 in)	Dynamo Moscow	(Russia)
PG	7	Kristy Wallace	25 – 3 January 1996	1.80 m (5 ft 11 in)	Southside Flyers	(Australia)
F	8	Lauren Nicholson	28 – 26 March 1993	1.82 m (6 ft 0 in)	Townsville Fire	(Australia)
G	9	Jade Melbourne	19 – 18 August 2002	1.78 m (5 ft 10 in)	Canberra Capitals	(Australia)
G	10	Alexandra Sharp	24 – 4 February 1997	1.82 m (6 ft 0 in)	Perth Lynx	(Australia)
G	11	Jazmin Shelley	21 – 13 May 2000	1.75 m (5 ft 9 in)	Nebraska Cornhuskers	(United States)
PF	12	Darcee Garbin	27 – 24 June 1994	1.88 m (6 ft 2 in)	Perth Lynx	(Australia)
PF	13	Keely Froling	25 – 31 January 1996	1.87 m (6 ft 2 in)	Sydney Uni Flames	(Australia)
PF	14	Zitina Aokuso	22 – 23 November 1998	1.90 m (6 ft 3 in)	Townsville Fire	(Australia)
PF	15	Lauren Scherf	25 – 7 March 1996	1.95 m (6 ft 5 in)	Perth Lynx	(Australia)
SG	22	Abigail Wehrung	25 – 28 December 1995	1.77 m (5 ft 10 in)	Adelaide Lightning	(Australia)

Head coach

- (Australia) Paul Goriss

Assistant coach(es)

- (Australia) Kristen Veal

Legend

- Club – describes last
  club before the tournament
- Age – describes age
  on 27 September 2021

==== China ====
China women's national basketball team roster
Players
Coaches

Pos.	No.	Name	Age – Date of birth	Height	Club	Ctr.
PG	3	Yang Liwei	26 – 2 January 1995	1.75 m (5 ft 9 in)	Guangdong Vermilion Birds	(China)
G	4	Li Yuan	21 – 29 May 2000	1.70 m (5 ft 7 in)	Shandong Six Stars	(China)
G	5	Wang Siyu	25 – 16 October 1995	1.80 m (5 ft 11 in)	Shandong Six Stars	(China)
G	6	Wu Tongtong	27 – 27 June 1994	1.75 m (5 ft 9 in)	Shanxi Flame	(China)
F	8	Zhang Ru	22 – 2 September 1999	1.85 m (6 ft 1 in)	Henan Phoenix	(China)
SG	9	Li Meng	26 – 2 January 1995	1.83 m (6 ft 0 in)	Liaoning Flying Eagles	(China)
F	10	Pan Zhenqi	26 – 5 July 1995	1.90 m (6 ft 3 in)	Beijing Great Wall	(China)
PF	11	Huang Sijing	25 – 8 January 1996	1.90 m (6 ft 3 in)	Guangdong Vermilion Birds	(China)
C	13	Yang Hengyu	26 – 11 January 1995	1.93 m (6 ft 4 in)	Shandong Six Stars	(China)
C	14	Li Yueru	22 – 28 March 1999	2.01 m (6 ft 7 in)	Guangdong Vermilion Birds	(China)
C	15	Han Xu	21 – 31 October 1999	2.05 m (6 ft 9 in)	Xinjiang Magic Deer	(China)
SG	16	Li Yifan	22 – 26 December 1998	1.84 m (6 ft 0 in)	Beijing Great Wall	(China)

Head coach

- (China) Xu Limin

Assistant coach(es)

- (China) Jia Nan
- (China) Zheng Wei

Legend

- Club – describes last
  club before the tournament
- Age – describes age
  on 27 September 2021

==== Chinese Taipei ====
Chinese Taipei women's national basketball team roster
Players
Coaches

Pos.	No.	Name	Age – Date of birth	Height	Club	Ctr.
G	6	Chen Wei-an	25 – 1 November 1995	1.76 m (5 ft 9 in)	Cathay Life	(Chinese Taipei)
G	7	Chu Yu-chin	25 – 1 April 1996	1.62 m (5 ft 4 in)	Taiyuan Textile	(Chinese Taipei)
F	9	Lin Wen-yu	26 – 1 August 1995	1.80 m (5 ft 11 in)	Taiyuan Textile	(Chinese Taipei)
F	10	Han Ya-en	26 – 1 January 1995	1.80 m (5 ft 11 in)	Cathay Life	(Chinese Taipei)
G	11	Lin Hsien-fang	30 – 16 August 1991	1.68 m (5 ft 6 in)	Beijing Great Wall	(China)
G	12	Lin Yu-ting	27 – 25 January 1994	1.78 m (5 ft 10 in)	Cathay Life	(Chinese Taipei)
C	13	Cheng I-hsiu	28 – 24 June 1993	1.78 m (5 ft 10 in)	Cathay Life	(Chinese Taipei)
C	22	Lin Tieh	22 – 2 August 1999	1.82 m (6 ft 0 in)	Taiyuan Textile	(Chinese Taipei)
SG	24	Liu Hsi-yeh	29 – 10 October 1991	1.75 m (5 ft 9 in)	Free agent
F	27	Tai I-ting	25 – 12 November 1995	1.75 m (5 ft 9 in)	Cathay Life	(Chinese Taipei)
G	55	Peng Hsiao-tong	23 – 19 February 1998	1.69 m (5 ft 7 in)	Taiyuan Textile	(Chinese Taipei)
SG	88	Wang Yu Yi-wen	24 – 16 October 1996	1.74 m (5 ft 9 in)	Free agent

Head coach

- (Chinese Taipei) Chien Wei-chuan

Assistant coach(es)

- (Chinese Taipei) Chu Yung-hsu

Legend

- Club – describes last
  club before the tournament
- Age – describes age
  on 27 September 2021

==== Philippines ====
The roster was announced on 9 September 2021.

Philippines women's national basketball team roster
Players
Coaches

Pos.	No.	Name	Age – Date of birth	Height	Club	Ctr.
SG	0	Ana Castillo	24 – 5 October 1996	1.62 m (5 ft 4 in)	Glutagence Glow Boosters	(Philippines)
PG	1	Nathalie Prado	25 – 23 July 1996	1.74 m (5 ft 9 in)	Free agent
F	3	Afril Bernardino	25 – 3 April 1996	1.72 m (5 ft 8 in)	Free agent
PG	5	Ella Fajardo	18 – 15 March 2003	1.65 m (5 ft 5 in)	Free agent
G	6	France Cabinbin	29 – 6 December 1991	1.57 m (5 ft 2 in)	Free agent
SG	7	Janine Pontejos	28 – 29 October 1992	1.65 m (5 ft 5 in)	Free agent
SF	8	Ria Nabalan	24 – 2 November 1996	1.70 m (5 ft 7 in)	NU Bulldogs	(Philippines)
SG	14	Karl Pingol	19 – 14 October 2001	1.70 m (5 ft 7 in)	NU Bulldogs	(Philippines)
C	17	Clare Castro	24 – 13 January 1997	1.71 m (5 ft 7 in)	Parañaque Lady Aces	(Philippines)
G	18	Marizze Tongco	25 – 18 October 1995	1.57 m (5 ft 2 in)	NU Bulldogs	(Philippines)
SG	21	Camille Clarin	20 – 28 May 2001	1.78 m (5 ft 10 in)	NU Bulldogs	(Philippines)
PF	24	Kristine Cayabyab	19 – 26 August 2002	1.77 m (5 ft 10 in)	NU Bulldogs	(Philippines)

Head coach

- (Philippines) Patrick Aquino

Assistant coach(es)

- (Philippines) Julie Amos
- (Philippines) José García

Legend

- Club – describes last
  club before the tournament
- Age describes age
  on 27 September 2021

== Division B ==
=== Group A ===
==== Iran ====
Iran women's national basketball team roster
Players
Coaches

Pos.	No.	Name	Age – Date of birth	Height	Club	Ctr.
SF	1	Negin Rasoulipour Khameneh	21 – January 6, 2000	1.76 m (5 ft 9 in)		(Iran)
PG	2	Anahis Khodaverdian	23 – January 8, 1998	1.70 m (5 ft 7 in)		(Iran)
PF	4	Delaram Vakili	30 – July 24, 1991	1.85 m (6 ft 1 in)		(Iran)
SG	6	Shadi Abdolvand	28 – November 14, 1992	1.70 m (5 ft 7 in)		(Iran)
SF	9	Sheida Shojaeikohnehshahri	23 – August 3, 1998	1.79 m (5 ft 10 in)		(Iran)
SF	10	Kimiya Yazdian Tehrani	25 – July 13, 1996	1.79 m (5 ft 10 in)		(Iran)
F	14	Farzaneh Foroutanfard	28 – January 28, 1993	1.80 m (5 ft 11 in)		(Iran)
PF	17	Masoumeh Esmaeilzadeh Soudjani	31 – December 13, 1989	1.82 m (6 ft 0 in)		(Iran)
SG	25	Asal Pourheidari	30 – October 1, 1991	1.70 m (5 ft 7 in)		(Iran)
C	41	Aida Golmohammadi	20 – May 4, 2001	1.96 m (6 ft 5 in)		(Iran)
SF	77	Faezah Shahriari	27 – October 28, 1994	1.75 m (5 ft 9 in)		(Iran)
C	99	Edna Eissaianjangi	49 – September 21, 1972	1.80 m (5 ft 11 in)		(Iran)

Head coach

- (Iran) Shayesteh Motesharrei

Assistant coach(es)

- (Iran) Azadeh Zamanpour
- (Iran) Mehran Atashi

Legend

- (C) Team captain
- (NP) Naturalized player
- Club – describes last
  club before the tournament
- Age – describes age
  on 7 November 2021

==== Lebanon ====
Lebanon roster for the 2021 FIBA Women's Asia Cup.

Lebanon women's national basketball team roster
Players
Coaches

Pos.	No.	Name	Age – Date of birth	Height	Club	Ctr.
SG	5	Meghry Toros	26 – May 18, 1995	1.74 m (5 ft 9 in)		(Lebanon)
C	6	Chirine El Charif	37 – October 6, 1984	1.83 m (6 ft 0 in)		(Lebanon)
C	7	Narine Gyokchian	28 – July 22, 1993	1.87 m (6 ft 2 in)		(Lebanon)
PF	8	Daniella Fayad	24 – April 9, 1997	1.80 m (5 ft 11 in)		(Lebanon)
SF	9	Layla Fares	32 – March 12, 1989	1.75 m (5 ft 9 in)		(Lebanon)
PG	11	Rebecca Akl	29 – October 18, 1992	1.70 m (5 ft 7 in)		(Lebanon)
PG	13	Miramar Mokdad	33 – December 24, 1987	1.70 m (5 ft 7 in)		(Lebanon)
C	15	Brittany Denson	34 – June 10, 1987	1.91 m (6 ft 3 in)		(Lebanon)
SG	16	Yasha Zeinoun	19 – January 18, 2002	1.75 m (5 ft 9 in)		(Lebanon)
SG	23	Lama Moukaddem	30 – December 5, 1990	1.73 m (5 ft 8 in)		(Lebanon)
PG	24	Amar Mansour	17 – November 7, 2004	1.77 m (5 ft 10 in)		(Lebanon)
PF	33	Aida Bakhos	35 – March 21, 1986	1.77 m (5 ft 10 in)		(Lebanon)

Head coach

- (Lebanon) Georges El Dabbak Geagea

Assistant coach(es)

- (Lebanon) Ziag Al Natour

Legend

- (C) Team captain
- (NP) Naturalized player
- Club – describes last
  club before the tournament
- Age – describes age
  on 7 November 2021

==== Syria ====
Syria women's national basketball team roster
Players
Coaches

Pos.	No.	Name	Age – Date of birth	Height	Club	Ctr.
G	1	Jehan Mamlouk	28 – January 10, 1993	1.60 m (5 ft 3 in)		(Syria)
SG	3	Jessica Hakimeh	26 – July 13, 1995	1.67 m (5 ft 6 in)		(Syria)
F	4	Alicia Magarian	30 – March 22, 1991	1.75 m (5 ft 9 in)		(Syria)
PG	5	Marya Daibess	31 – August 5, 1990	1.67 m (5 ft 6 in)		(Syria)
SG	6	Cedra Sulaiman	23 – February 14, 1998	1.72 m (5 ft 8 in)		(Syria)
PF	7	Noura Bshara	21 – January 1, 2000	1.79 m (5 ft 10 in)		(Syria)
C	10	Johna Mbayed	25 – March 19, 1996	1.83 m (6 ft 0 in)		(Syria)
PF	12	Rasha Skran	34 – May 20, 1987	1.79 m (5 ft 10 in)		(Syria)
C	15	Sana Chalabi	29 – September 10, 1992	1.83 m (6 ft 0 in)		(Syria)
G	22	Randi Keonsha Brown	25 – May 13, 1996	1.75 m (5 ft 9 in)		(Syria)
SF	66	Minerva Ajjan	24 – September 16, 1997	1.70 m (5 ft 7 in)		(Syria)
PF	88	Anna Aghnanian Aslanian	20 – January 8, 2001	1.80 m (5 ft 11 in)		(Syria)

Head coach

- (Syria) Somar Khouri

Legend

- (C) Team captain
- (NP) Naturalized player
- Club – describes last
  club before the tournament
- Age – describes age
  on 7 November 2021

=== Group B ===
==== Indonesia ====
Indonesia women's national basketball team roster
Players
Coaches

Pos.	No.	Name	Age – Date of birth	Height	Club	Ctr.
PF	0	Lea Elvensia Wolobubo Kahol	22 – July 17, 1999	1.78 m (5 ft 10 in)		(Indonesia)
PG	2	Agustin Elya Gradita Retong	26 – August 24, 1995	1.67 m (5 ft 6 in)		(Indonesia)
SG	7	Kadek Pratita Citta Dewi	26 – August 13, 1995	1.68 m (5 ft 6 in)		(Indonesia)
SF	10	Priscilla Annabel Karen	25 – May 29, 1996	1.70 m (5 ft 7 in)		(Indonesia)
SG	12	Sumiati Sumiati	31 – April 16, 1990	1.68 m (5 ft 6 in)		(Indonesia)
PF	13	Yuni Anggraeni	27 – June 28, 1994	1.75 m (5 ft 9 in)		(Indonesia)
SG	21	Nathania Claresta Orville	21 – August 3, 2000	1.76 m (5 ft 9 in)		(Indonesia)
C	22	Gabriel Sophia	29 – November 22, 1991	1.83 m (6 ft 0 in)		(Indonesia)
SF	24	Mega Nanda Perdana Putri	31 – June 24, 1990	1.68 m (5 ft 6 in)		(Indonesia)
SF	25	Henny Sutjiono	27 – February 2, 1994	1.68 m (5 ft 6 in)		(Indonesia)
PF	26	Kim Pierre-Louis	28 – August 11, 1993	1.83 m (6 ft 0 in)		(Indonesia)
C	99	Angelica Jennifer Candra	16 – July 5, 2005	1.80 m (5 ft 11 in)		(Indonesia)

Head coach

- (Chinese Taipei) Lin Chi-Wen

Assistant coach(es)

- (Indonesia) Wellyanto Pribadi
- (Chinese Taipei) July Wong

Legend

- (C) Team captain
- (NP) Naturalized player
- Club – describes last
  club before the tournament
- Age – describes age
  on 7 November 2021

==== Jordan ====
Jordan women's national basketball team roster
Players
Coaches

Pos.	No.	Name	Age – Date of birth	Height	Club	Ctr.
C	1	Dana Fadda	34 – December 30, 1986	1.87 m (6 ft 2 in)		(Jordan)
PG	4	Anoud Alassi	26 – February 21, 1995	1.75 m (5 ft 9 in)		(Jordan)
G	6	Juna Haddad	26 – May 6, 1995	1.65 m (5 ft 5 in)		(Jordan)
C	8	Thekra Shehadeh	18 – September 29, 2003	1.98 m (6 ft 6 in)		(Jordan)
PG	9	Natasha Cloud	29 – February 22, 1992	1.83 m (6 ft 0 in)		(United States)
G	10	Liliana Abu Jbara	24 – July 6, 1997	1.78 m (5 ft 10 in)		(Jordan)
G	12	Rasha Abdo	32 – May 27, 1989	1.64 m (5 ft 5 in)		(Jordan)
PF	13	Farah Al Shiyyab	27 – July 23, 1994	1.75 m (5 ft 9 in)		(Jordan)
F	15	Marya Al Hinn	23 – July 15, 1998	1.78 m (5 ft 10 in)		(Jordan)
PG	16	Farah Ali Nafi	28 – October 2, 1993	1.68 m (5 ft 6 in)		(Jordan)
F	24	Zara Najjar	27 – July 30, 1994	1.87 m (6 ft 2 in)		(Jordan)
G	66	Tala Shahatit	23 – June 6, 1998	1.70 m (5 ft 7 in)		(Jordan)

Head coach

- (Jordan) Faisal Ali Yousef Ensour

Assistant coach(es)

- (Jordan) Nayef Assfour

Legend

- (C) Team captain
- (NP) Naturalized player
- Club – describes last
  club before the tournament
- Age – describes age
  on 7 November 2021

==== Kazakhstan ====
Kazakhstan women's national basketball team roster
Players
Coaches

Pos.	No.	Name	Age – Date of birth	Height	Club	Ctr.
PF	3	Zalina Kurazova	36 – January 28, 1985	1.86 m (6 ft 1 in)		(Kazakhstan)
PG	6	Oxana Bagmet	25 – October 9, 1996	1.70 m (5 ft 7 in)		(Kazakhstan)
SF	7	Tamara Yagodkina	31 – January 10, 1990	1.83 m (6 ft 0 in)		(Kazakhstan)
SG	8	Mariya Astapenko	32 – May 28, 1989	1.80 m (5 ft 11 in)		(Kazakhstan)
PG	9	Anastassiya Alishauskaite	32 – December 5, 1988	1.73 m (5 ft 8 in)		(Kazakhstan)
C	11	Anastassiya Ilyassova	22 – November 30, 1998	1.85 m (6 ft 1 in)		(Kazakhstan)
SG	12	Dilnaz Yerkebay	18 – February 10, 2003	1.80 m (5 ft 11 in)		(Kazakhstan)
SG	16	Yekaterina Beschastnova	18 – April 13, 2003	1.76 m (5 ft 9 in)		(Kazakhstan)
SF	17	Daria Koroleva	33 – February 14, 1988	1.82 m (6 ft 0 in)		(Kazakhstan)
PF	23	Rauan Tutkishova	30 – January 25, 1991	1.82 m (6 ft 0 in)		(Kazakhstan)
SF	44	Kamazhay Otegenova	20 – May 28, 2001	1.80 m (5 ft 11 in)		(Kazakhstan)
PG	99	Elvira Mirsagatova	17 – November 29, 2003	1.70 m (5 ft 7 in)		(Kazakhstan)

Head coach

- (Kazakhstan) Vitaliy Strebkov

Assistant coach(es)

- (Kazakhstan) Vitaliy Lopatin
- (Kazakhstan) Azamat Kabdylkarimov

Legend

- (C) Team captain
- (NP) Naturalized player
- Club – describes last
  club before the tournament
- Age – describes age
  on 7 November 2021
