= 2019 WCBA Playoffs =

The 2019 WCBA Playoffs is the postseason tournament of the 2018–19 season. It began on 13 February 2019.

== Bracket ==
First Round
1	Guangdong Vermilion Birds	3
8	Shanxi Flame	0
4	Xinjiang Magic Deer	1
5	Beijing Great Wall	3
3	Jiangsu Phoenix	3
6	Shandong Golden Stars	1
2	Bayi Kylin	3
7	Shanghai Swordfish	0

Semifinals
1	Guangdong Vermilion Birds	3
5	Beijing Great Wall	0
3	Jiangsu Phoenix	0
2	Bayi Kylin	3

Finals
1	Guangdong Vermilion Birds	3
2	Bayi Kylin	2

- Bold Series winner
- Italics Team with home-court advantage

== First round ==
All times are in China standard time (UTC+8)

=== (1) Guangdong Vermilion Birds vs. (8) Shanxi Flame ===
13 February 2019
19:30

Boxscore

Guangdong Vermilion Birds	84–71	Shanxi Flame
Scoring by quarter: 18–17, 22–9, 25–17, 19–28
Guangdong leads series, 1–0

Dalang Arena, Dongguan, Guangdong
Referees: Wang Qiulin, Yao Yuan, Zhang Chao

15 February 2019
19:30

Boxscore

Guangdong Vermilion Birds	86–83	Shanxi Flame
Scoring by quarter: 22–17, 19–16, 26–18, 19–32
Guangdong leads series, 2–0

Dalang Arena, Dongguan, Guangdong
Referees: Duan Xiaopeng, Zhang Miao, Yuan Yajie

18 February 2019
19:30

Boxscore

Shanxi Flame	68–80	Guangdong Vermilion Birds
Scoring by quarter: 12–17, 16–23, 9–24, 31–16
Guangdong wins series, 3–0

Shanxi Sports Centre Gymnasium, Taiyuan, Shanxi
Referees: Lu Qiang, Hu Jing, Diao Jiayu

=== (2) Bayi Kylin vs. (7) Shanghai Swordfish ===
13 February 2019
19:30

Boxscore

Bayi Kylin	85–65	Shanghai Swordfish
Scoring by quarter: 19–15, 20–11, 21–19, 25–20
Bayi leads series, 1–0

Nanchang International Sports Center Gymnasium, Nanchang, Jiangxi
Referees: Shi Qirong, Pan Dazhi, Teng Fei

15 February 2019
19:30

Boxscore

Bayi Kylin	88–82	Shanghai Swordfish
Scoring by quarter: 30–23, 17–24, 18–23, 23–12
Bayi leads series, 2–0

Nanchang International Sports Center Gymnasium, Nanchang, Jiangxi
Referees: Wang Zebo, Wang Ding, Wang Yufei

18 February 2019
16:00

Boxscore

Shanghai Swordfish	70–94	Bayi Kylin
Scoring by quarter: 22–24, 18–26, 17–22, 13–22
Bayi wins series, 3–0

Baoshan Sports Center Gymnasium, Shanghai
Referees: Fang Wenxuan, Xu Changming, Li Li

=== (3) Jiangsu Phoenix vs. (6) Shandong Golden Stars ===
13 February 2019
19:30

Boxscore

Jiangsu Phoenix	77–65	Shandong Golden Stars
Scoring by quarter: 16–12, 19–14, 23–19, 19–20
Jiangsu leads series, 1–0

Liyang Olympic Sports Center Gymnasium, Liyang, Jiangsu
Referees: Peng Ling, Liu Shuo, Pu Yan

15 February 2019
16:00

Boxscore

Jiangsu Phoenix	71–64	Shandong Golden Stars
Scoring by quarter: 18–14, 17–13, 14–20, 22–17
Jiangsu leads series, 2–0

Liyang Olympic Sports Center Gymnasium, Liyang, Jiangsu
Referees: Xue Kui, Ge Qian, Zhang Jian

18 February 2019
19:30

Boxscore

Shandong Golden Stars	66–62	Jiangsu Phoenix
Scoring by quarter: 23–13, 15–13, 10–17, 18–19
Jiangsu leads series, 2–1

Penglai Gymnasium, Yantai, Shandong
Referees: Liu Ke, Liu Sen, Guan Hui

20 February 2019
19:30

Boxscore

Shandong Golden Stars	57–71	Jiangsu Phoenix
Scoring by quarter: 9–14, 17–16, 11–24, 20–17
Jiangsu wins series, 3–1

Penglai Gymnasium, Yantai, Shandong
Referees: Yan Jun, Shi Jing, Liu Tao

=== (4) Xinjiang Magic Deer vs. (5) Beijing Great Wall ===
13 February 2019
20:00

Boxscore

Xinjiang Magic Deer	75–86	Beijing Great Wall
Scoring by quarter: 18–25, 19–18, 18–24, 20–19
Beijing leads series, 1–0

Xinjiang Sports Centre Gymnasium, Ürümqi, Xinjiang
Referees: Zhang Wei, Wang Haiying, Geng Zijian

15 February 2019
20:00

Boxscore

Xinjiang Magic Deer	72–71	Beijing Great Wall
Scoring by quarter: 24–21, 11–23, 21–12, 16–15
Series tied at, 1–1

Xinjiang Sports Centre Gymnasium, Ürümqi, Xinjiang
Referees: Zuo Kun, Feng Lei, Li Pengbo

18 February 2019
19:30

Boxscore

Beijing Great Wall	75–67	Xinjiang Magic Deer
Scoring by quarter: 21–12, 16–22, 23–15, 15–18
Beijing leads series, 2–1

Shougang Basketball Center, Beijing
Referees: Shi Jing, Wang Yang, Sun Yimiao

20 February 2019
19:30

Boxscore

Beijing Great Wall	87–79	Xinjiang Magic Deer
Scoring by quarter: 28–27, 28–11, 12–21, 19–20
Beijing wins series, 3–1

Shougang Basketball Center, Beijing
Referees: Wang Mei, Fang Wenxuan, Liu Ke

== Semifinals ==
All times are in China standard time (UTC+8)

=== (1) Guangdong Vermilion Birds vs. (5) Beijing Great Wall ===
27 February 2019
19:30

Boxscore

Guangdong Vermilion Birds	88–77	Beijing Great Wall
Scoring by quarter: 27–16, 18–16, 25–20, 18–25
Guangdong leads series, 1–0

Dalang Arena, Dongguan, Guangdong
Referees: Yan Jun, Zuo Kun, Zhang Shuimiao

1 March 2019
16:00

Boxscore

Guangdong Vermilion Birds	96–82	Beijing Great Wall
Scoring by quarter: –, –, –, –
Guangdong leads series, 2–0

Dalang Arena, Dongguan, Guangdong

4 March 2019
19:30

Boxscore

Beijing Great Wall	71–74	Guangdong Vermilion Birds
Scoring by quarter: –, –, –, –
Guangdong wins series, 3–0

Shougang Basketball Center, Beijing

=== (2) Bayi Kylin vs. (3) Jiangsu Phoenix ===
27 February 2019
16:00

Boxscore

Bayi Kylin	76–66	Jiangsu Phoenix
Scoring by quarter: 14–14, 22–18, 21–19, 19–15
Bayi leads series, 1–0

Nanchang International Sports Center Gymnasium, Nanchang, Jiangxi
Referees: Wang Mei, Liu Ke, Liu Sen

1 March 2019
19:30

Boxscore

Bayi Kylin	90–83	Jiangsu Phoenix
Scoring by quarter: –, –, –, –
Bayi leads series, 2–0

Nanchang International Sports Center Gymnasium, Nanchang, Jiangxi

4 March 2019
16:00

Boxscore

Jiangsu Phoenix	80–102	Bayi Kylin
Scoring by quarter: –, –, –, –
Bayi wins series, 3–0

Liyang Olympic Sports Center Gymnasium, Liyang, Jiangsu

== Finals ==
All times are in China standard time (UTC+8)

=== (1) Guangdong Vermilion Birds vs. (2) Bayi Kylin ===
13 March 2019
15:30

Boxscore

Guangdong Vermilion Birds	89–63	Bayi Kylin
Scoring by quarter: 31–13, 21–14, 21–18, 16–18
Guangdong leads series, 1–0

Dalang Arena, Dongguan, Guangdong
Referees: Wang Xiaochun, Wang Zebo, Wang Yang

15 March 2019
19:30

Boxscore

Guangdong Vermilion Birds	89–93	Bayi Kylin
Scoring by quarter: 20–22, 22–24, 18–22, 29–25
Series tied, 1–1

Dalang Arena, Dongguan, Guangdong
Referees: Yan Jun, Xue Kui, Yao Yuan

18 March 2019
16:10

Boxscore

Bayi Kylin	91–98	Guangdong Vermilion Birds
Scoring by quarter: 29–27, 19–27, 18–21, 25–23
Guangdong leads series, 2–1

Nanchang International Sports Center Gymnasium, Nanchang, Jiangxi
Referees: Wang Mei, Ge Qian, Duan Xiaopeng

20 March 2019
16:10

Boxscore

Bayi Kylin	94–90	Guangdong Vermilion Birds
Scoring by quarter: 23–33, 24–18, 21–12, 26–27
Series tied, 2–2

Nanchang International Sports Center Gymnasium, Nanchang, Jiangxi
Referees: Liang Bin, Han Xu, Shi Jing

23 March 2019
19:30

Boxscore

Guangdong Vermilion Birds	97–81	Bayi Kylin
Scoring by quarter: 20–15, 18–19, 33–20, 26–27
Guangdong wins series, 3–2

Dalang Arena, Dongguan, Guangdong
Referees: Wang Mei, Peng Ling, Ye Nan
