= Shi Xiufeng =

Chinese basketball player

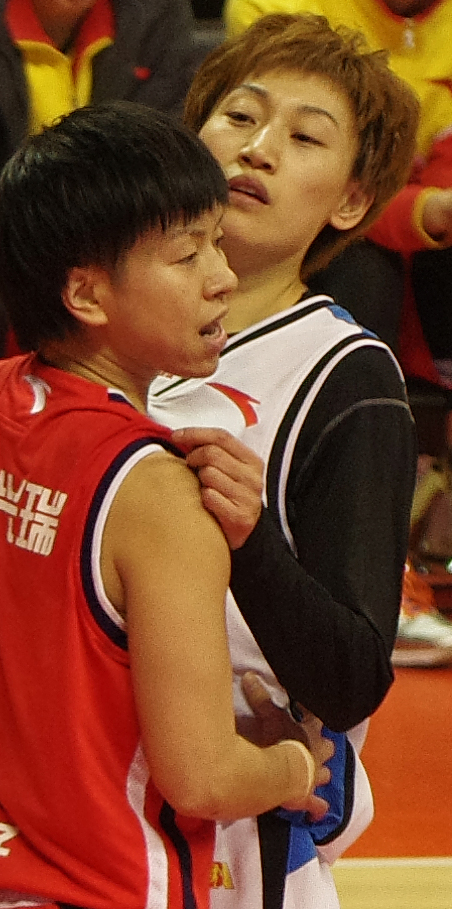
- Shi Xiufeng (in white) defended by Shanxi Flame's Yuko Oga during a 2014 WCBA game in Shanghai

No. 11 – Beijing Great Wall
- Position: Small forward
- League: WCBA

Personal information
- Born: September 16, 1987 (age 39) Tieling, Liaoning, China
- Listed height: 5 ft 10 in (1.78 m)

Career information
- Playing career: 2005–present

Career history
- 2005–16: Shanghai Swordfish
- 2016–present: Beijing Great Wall

Shi Xiufeng (Chinese: 史秀峰; pinyin: Shǐ Xiùfēng; born September 16, 1987) is a Chinese basketball player for Beijing Great Wall and the Chinese national team.

She participated at the 2017 FIBA Women's Asia Cup.
