= Huang Jing (disambiguation) =

Huang Jing (黄敬; 1912–1958) was a Chinese communist revolutionary and politician.

Huang Jing may also refer to:

- Huang Jing (academic) (黄靖; born 1956), Chinese-American political scientist
- Huang Jing (basketball) (黄靖, born 1985), Chinese basketball player
- Polygonatum, a genus of plants known as huang jing (黄精)
