= Shandong Sports Lottery =

Shandong Sports Lottery may refer to:

- Shandong Sports Lottery, a government-sponsored sports lottery in Shandong, China
  - Shandong women's volleyball team, a women's volleyball team sponsored by Shandong Sports Lottery
  - Shandong Six Stars, a women's basketball team sponsored by Shandong Sports Lottery
  - Shandong Sports Lottery F.C., a women's football (soccer) team sponsored by Shandong Sports Lottery
