= Li Yifan =

Chinese basketball player

Beijing Great Wall
- Position: Shooting guard
- League: WCBA

Personal information
- Born: 26 December 1998 (age 27)
- Listed height: 1.84 m (6 ft 0 in)

Career information
- WNBA draft: 2018: undrafted

Li Yifan (born 26 December 1998) is a Chinese professional basketball player for Beijing Great Wall and the Chinese national team.

She represented China at the 2021 FIBA Women's Asia Cup, where the team won the silver medal.
