= Li Shanshan (basketball) =

Chinese basketball player

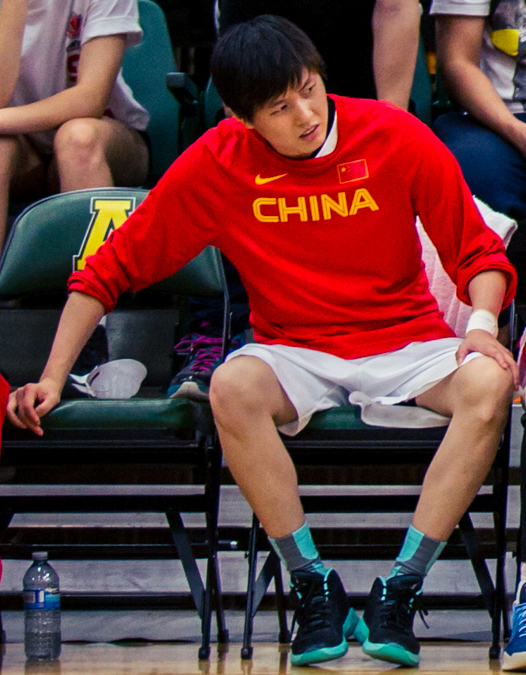
- Li Shanshan in 2016

Jiangsu Phoenix
- Position: Point guard
- League: WCBA

Personal information
- Born: March 3, 1987 (age 39) Nanjing, China
- Listed height: 5 ft 10 in (1.78 m)

Li Shanshan (Chinese: 李珊珊; pinyin: Lǐ Shānshān; born 3 March 1987) is a Chinese professional basketball player for China women's national basketball team. She was part of the squad for the 2012 Summer Olympics.
