= Wang Siyu =

Chinese basketball player

Southside Melbourne Flyers
- Position: Guard
- League: WNBL

Personal information
- Born: 16 October 1995 (age 31) Haiyang, Shandong, China
- Listed height: 5 ft 11 in (1.80 m)
- Listed weight: 143 lb (65 kg)

Career information
- WNBA draft: 2017: undrafted
- Playing career: 2013–present
- Coaching career: 2025–present

Career history

Playing
- 2013–2014: Shandong Six Stars
- 2014–2015: Bayi Kylin
- 2015–2019: Shandong Six Stars
- 2019–2021: Xinjiang Magic Deer
- 2021–2022: Shandong Six Stars
- 2022–2026: Sichuan Yuanda
- 2026–present: Southside Melbourne Flyers

Coaching
- 2025–2026: Sichuan Yuanda (assistant)
Medals
Representing China
World Cup
Silver medal – second place	2022 Australia
Asia Cup
Gold medal – first place	2023 Australia
Silver medal – second place	2021 Jordan
Bronze medal – third place	2025 China
Asian Games
Gold medal – first place	2022 Hangzhou	Team
Gold medal – first place	2018 Jakarta	Team
Representing China
Asian Beach Games
Gold medal – first place	2016 Da Nang	3x3 team
Silver medal – second place	2012 Haiyang	3x3 team

Wang Siyu (Chinese: 王思雨; pinyin: Wáng Sīyǔ, born 16 October 1995) is a Chinese basketball player. Active since 2013, she represented China at the 2018 and 2022 FIBA Women's Basketball World Cup, where her performance in the semifinals against host Australia was crucial to China reaching the finals.
