= Huang Jing (basketball) =

Chinese basketball player

Shanghai Swordfish
- Position: Forward
- League: WCBA

Personal information
- Born: November 24, 1985 (age 40)
- Listed height: 6 ft 2 in (1.88 m)

Huang Jing (Chinese: 黄靖, born 24 November 1985) is a Chinese basketball player for Shanghai Swordfish and the Chinese national team, where she participated at the 2014 FIBA World Championship.
