= Li Yueru =

Chinese basketball player (born 1999)

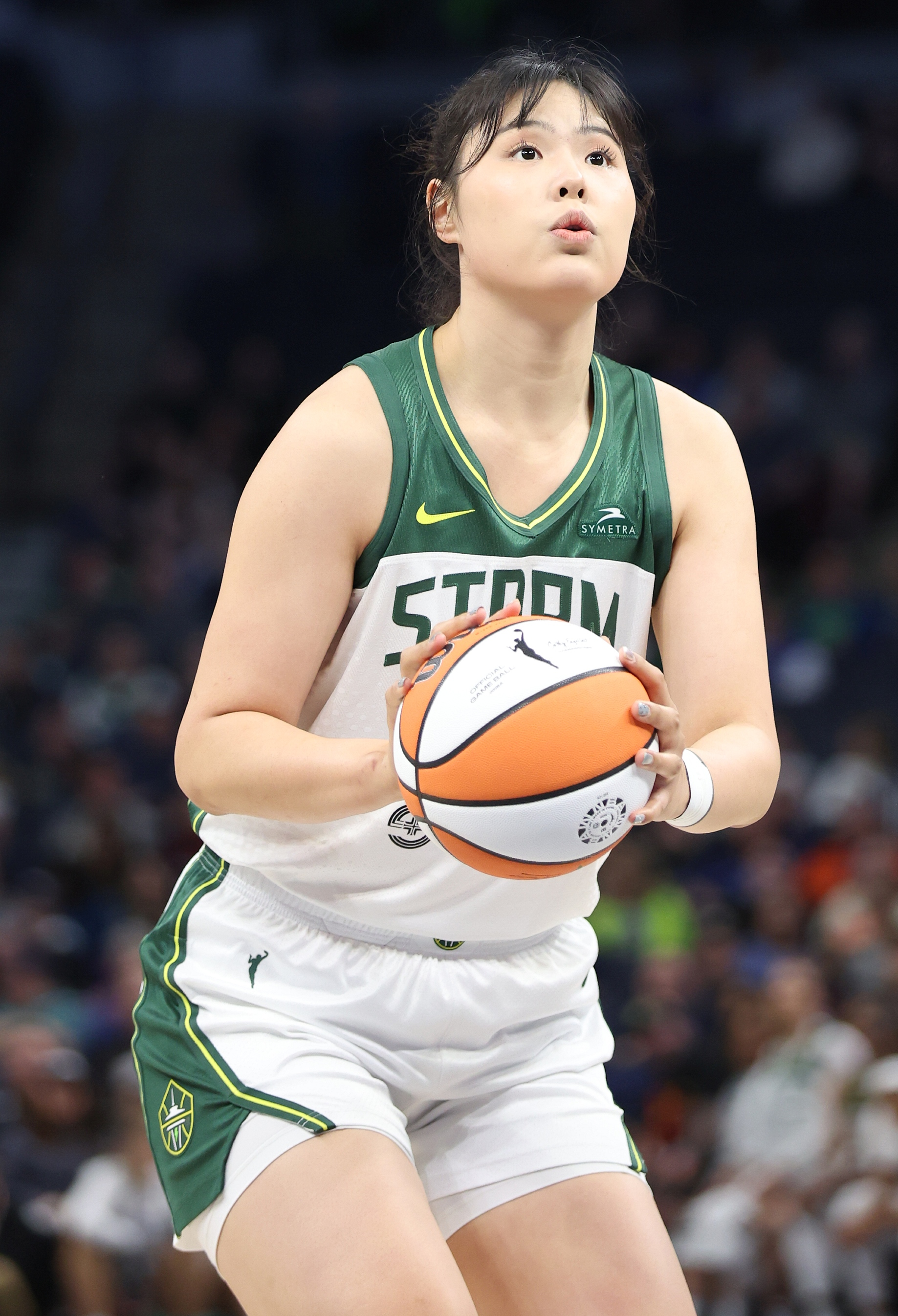
- Li with the Seattle Storm in 2025

No. 28 – Dallas Wings
- Position: Center
- League: WNBA

Personal information
- Born: 28 March 1999 (age 27) Changzhi, Shanxi, China
- Listed height: 6 ft 7 in (2.01 m)

Career information
- WNBA draft: 2019: 3rd round, 35th overall pick
- Drafted by: Atlanta Dream
- Playing career: 2015–present

Career history
- 2015–2020: Guangdong Dolphins
- 2020–2023: Inner Mongolia Nongxin
- 2022: Chicago Sky
- 2023–2024: Beşiktaş
- 2024: Los Angeles Sparks
- 2024: Bodrum Basketbol
- 2024–2025: Galatasaray
- 2025: Seattle Storm
- 2025–present: Dallas Wings
- 2026–present: Mist BC

Career highlights
- Unrivaled champion (2026); 3x WCBA champion (2019, 2021, 2022); WCBA Finals MVP (2019); 4x WCBA All-Star (2018, 2019, 2021, 2023); 3x WCBA rebound leader (2018, 2019, 2023); WCBA scoring leader (2019); WCBA Rookie of the Year (2018)
- Stats at Basketball Reference
Medals
Women's basketball
Representing China
World Cup
Silver medal – second place	2022 Australia
FIBA Asia Cup
Silver medal – second place	2021 Jordan
Bronze medal – third place	2017 Bangalore
Asian Games
Gold medal – first place	2022 Hangzhou	Team
Gold medal – first place	2018 Jakarta	Team

Li Yueru
- Simplified Chinese: 李月汝
Transcriptions
Standard Mandarin
- Hanyu Pinyin: Lǐ Yuèrǔ

Li Yueru (Chinese: 李月汝; born 28 March 1999) is a Chinese basketball player for the Dallas Wings of the Women's National Basketball Association (WNBA) and for the Phantom of Unrivaled. She also plays for the Chinese national team. Li was drafted in the third round of the 2019 WNBA draft by the Atlanta Dream.

== Professional career ==
=== China ===
Li started her professional career in China. She played for the Guangdong Dolphins (2015–2020) and Inner Mongolia (2020–2023) of the Women's Chinese Basketball Association (WCBA).

=== WNBA ===
==== Chicago Sky (2022) ====
Li was originally drafted with the 35th pick by the Atlanta Dream in the 2019 WNBA draft. However, she continued playing in China and never joined the Dream. On 5 February 2022, her rights were traded to the Los Angeles Sparks along with Chennedy Carter in exchange for Erica Wheeler, a 2023 WNBA draft first-round pick and a 2022 WNBA draft second-round pick. Li was subsequently traded on 30 March 2022, to the Chicago Sky in exchange for Lexie Brown. Li joined the team late, as she was waiting for permission from the Chinese Basketball Association, and did not see a lot of playing time during the season. She left the Sky at the end of July to join her national team in preparation for the 2022 FIBA Women's Basketball World Cup.

Li missed the 2023 WNBA season due to an injury suffered during overseas play.

==== Los Angeles Sparks (2024) ====
On 21 February 2024, Li was traded to the Los Angeles Sparks along with Julie Allemand and a 2025 WNBA draft third-round pick in exchange for a 2024 WNBA draft first-round pick.

==== Seattle Storm (2025) ====
On 1 February 2025, the Seattle Storm acquired the reserve rights to Li in a three-team trade and subsequently signed her to a contract.

==== Dallas Wings (2025–present) ====
On 14 June 2025, Li was traded to the Dallas Wings in exchange for a 2026 WNBA draft second-round pick and a 2027 WNBA draft third-round pick.

Li made significant impact after joining the Wings roster, immediately reshaping the team's interior presence on both offense and defense. In her first four games, she averaged 7.3 points and 7.3 rebounds, highlighted by a standout performance on June 24, when she recorded 10 points and a career-high 15 rebounds in a 68–55 win over the Atlanta Dream. Li played an instrumental role for the Wings during a period when Teaira McCowan and Luisa Geiselsöder were absent due to national team commitments. However, on August 19, the team announced that Li would miss the remainder of the season following an ACL sprain in her left knee, sustained during a 97–96 loss to the Los Angeles Sparks on August 15. She is expected to make a full recovery. Li concluded her third WNBA season with averages of 7.4 points and 5.8 rebounds per game.

=== Unrivaled ===
On 5 November 2025, it was announced that Li had been drafted by Mist BC for the 2026 Unrivaled season.

=== Turkey ===
==== Beşiktaş ====
Li played for Beşiktaş of the Women's Basketball Super League in the 2023–2024 season.

==== Bodrum Basketbol ====
Li signed with Bodrum Basketbol for the 2024–2025 season and played there from September to November.

==== Galatasaray ====
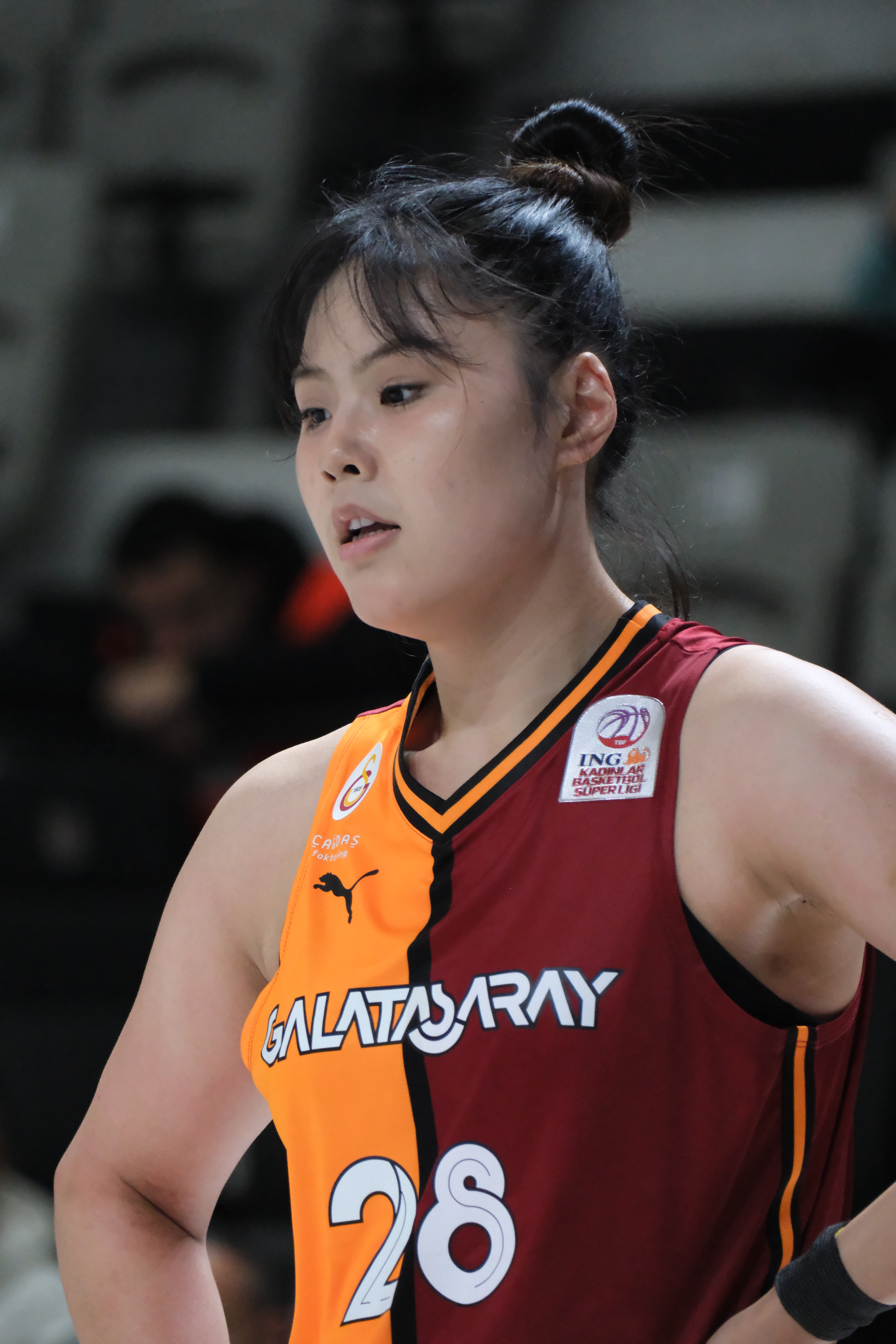
Yueru with Galatasaray in 2025

On 21 November 2024, Li signed with Galatasaray.

== National Team career ==
Li participated at the 2017 FIBA Women's Asia Cup. She competed for the Chinese national team at the 2024 Summer Olympics in Paris, where she led the team in points, rebounds, efficiency and field goal percentage.

== Career statistics ==
Legend
GP	Games played	GS	Games started	MPG	Minutes per game	RPG	Rebounds per game
APG	Assists per game	SPG	Steals per game	BPG	Blocks per game	PPG	Points per game
TO	Turnovers per game	FG%	Field-goal percentage	3P%	3-point field-goal percentage	FT%	Free-throw percentage
**Bold**	Career best	°	League leader

=== WCBA ===
Year	Team	GP	GS	MPG	FG%	3P%	FT%	RPG	APG	SPG	BPG	TO	PPG
2015–16	Guangdong Dolphins	20	9	7.6	.488	.000	.667	1.9	0.1	0.1	0.1	0.7	2.7
2016–17	Guangdong Dolphins	18	15	12.7	.489	1.000	.698	4.2	0.4	0.5	0.5	1.1	6.6
2017–18	Guangdong Dolphins	25	25	29.0	.534	.250	.732	10.5	1.5	0.4	1.2	3.5	18.2
2018–19	Guangdong Dolphins	33	33	25.9	.601	.167	.690	10.3	1.5	0.9	1.0	2.4	18.5
Career		96	82	20.4	.565	.211	.707	7.5	1.0	0.5	0.8	2.1	13.1

Source: WCBA

=== WNBA ===
==== Regular season ====
Stats current through end of 2025 season

WNBA regular season statistics
Year	Team	GP	GS	MPG	FG%	3P%	FT%	RPG	APG	SPG	BPG	TO	PPG
2019	Did not appear in WNBA												
2020	Did not appear in WNBA												
2021	Did not appear in WNBA												
2022	Chicago	16	0	5.1	.444	.000	**1.000**	1.5	0.1	0.1	0.1	**0.8**	1.8
2023	Did not appear in WNBA												
2024	Los Angeles	**38**	2	14.4	**.463**	.267	.898	3.7	0.6	0.3	0.2	0.9	5.1
2025	Seattle	9	0	8.7	.300	**.500**	.917	1.6	0.7	0.1	0.0	**0.8**	2.8
2025	Dallas	22	**12**	**20.0**	.421	.353	.842	**5.8**	**1.0**	**0.4**	**0.4**	1.0	**7.4**
**Career**	3 years, 4 teams	85	14	13.5	.434	.343	.893	3.6	0.6	0.3	0.2	0.9	4.8
