= Zhang Yu (basketball) =

Chinese basketball player

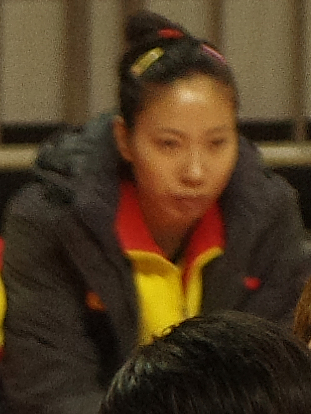

Zhang Yu (Chinese: 張瑜; pinyin: Zhāng Yú; born 12 February 1986 in Chaoyang, Liaoning) is a female Chinese basketball player who was part of the team that won the gold medal at the 2005–2006 WCBA. She competed at the 2008 Summer Olympics in Beijing. She is the twin sister of Zhang Wei. In 2013, she played for the Shanxi Xing Rui Flame, and won another WCBA title.
