= Ji Yanyan =

Chinese basketball player

Heilongjiang Chenneng
- Position: Forward
- League: WCBA

Personal information
- Born: May 29, 1985 (age 41)
- Listed height: 6 ft 0 in (1.83 m)

Ji Yanyan (Chinese: 纪妍妍; born 29 May 1985) is a basketball player for China women's national basketball team. She was part of the squad for the 2012 Summer Olympics.
