= Natalie Achonwa =

Canadian basketball player (born 1992)

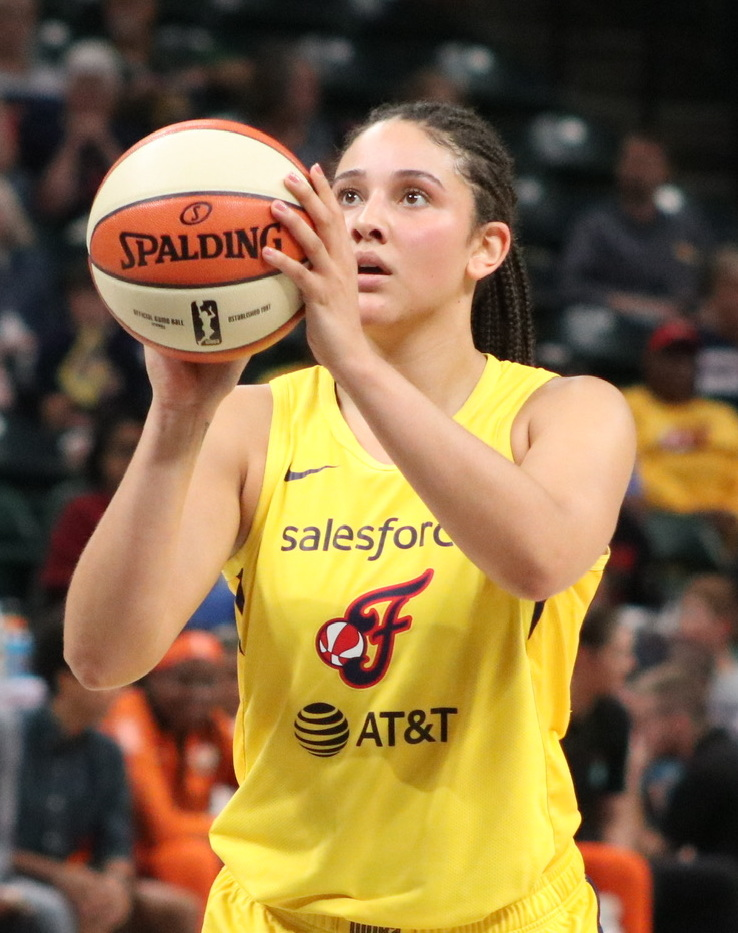
- Achonwa with the Indiana Fever in 2019

Seattle Storm
- Title: Assistant coach
- League: WNBA

Personal information
- Born: November 22, 1992 (age 33) Toronto, Ontario, Canada
- Listed height: 6 ft 3 in (1.91 m)
- Listed weight: 198 lb (90 kg)

Career information
- High school: St. Mary Catholic (Hamilton, Ontario)
- College: Notre Dame (2010–2014)
- WNBA draft: 2014: 1st round, 9th overall pick
- Drafted by: Indiana Fever
- Playing career: 2015–2024
- Position: Power forward
- Number: 11
- Coaching career: 2024–present

Career history

Playing
- 2015–2020: Indiana Fever
- 2015–2016: Dike Napoli
- 2016–2017: Bucheon KEB Hana Bank
- 2017–2018: Asan Woori Bank Wibee
- 2018–2019: Jiangsu Phoenix
- 2019–2020: Tango Bourges Basket
- 2020–2021: Famila Schio
- 2021–2023: Minnesota Lynx

Coaching
- 2024–2026: Michigan Wolverines (assistant)
- 2026–present: Seattle Storm (assistant)

Career highlights
- Dawn Staley Community Leadership Award (2020); WNBA Season-Long Community Assist Award (2019); WNBA All-Rookie Team (2015); Third-team All-American – AP (2015); Second-team All-ACC (2014); First-team All-Big East (2013); Big East All-Freshman Team (2011)
- Stats at WNBA.com
- Stats at Basketball Reference
Medals
Women's basketball
Representing Canada
FIBA AmeriCup
Gold medal – first place	2015 Canada
Silver medal – second place	2013 Mexico
Pan American Games
Gold medal – first place	2015 Toronto	Team

Natalie Chioma Achonwa (born November 22, 1992) is a Canadian former professional basketball player and coach, currently an assistant coach for the Seattle Storm of the Women's National Basketball Association (WNBA). She started coaching at the University of Michigan from 2024 through 2026. Achonwa is a four-time Olympian with the Canadian national team. She played for the Indiana Fever and Minnesota Lynx of the WNBA, and played college basketball for the Notre Dame Fighting Irish.

== Early life ==
Achonwa was born in Toronto, Ontario. She attended Centennial Collegiate Vocational Institute in Guelph, Ontario in ninth grade, before moving to Hamilton, Ontario to play with Canada Basketball's NEDA program at St. Mary Catholic.

== College career ==
Achonwa was recruited as the first ever international player on the Notre Dame Fighting Irish women's basketball team. In 2011, Achonwa was named to the Big East All-Freshman Team along with being selected Big East Freshman of the Week in her freshman season. In 2012, she was named to the NCAA Raleigh Regional All-Tournament Team. In her junior season, she was named as an Honorable Mention for the Associated Press All-America Team. Since her freshman season, she and her team have had four Final Four appearances and three National Championship appearances.

In what ended up being her final home game, the six-foot-three forward suffered a torn anterior cruciate ligament with about five minutes left in Notre Dame's 19-point victory over Baylor on March 31, 2014. This win helped push the Irish into the NCAA Final Four.

In 2015, Achonwa was selected as the Notre Dame Representative in the 2015 Atlantic Coast Conference Women's Legends Class.

=== College statistics ===
Legend
GP	Games played	GS	Games started	MPG	Minutes per game
FG%	Field goal percentage	3P%	3-point field goal percentage	FT%	Free throw percentage
RPG	Rebounds per game	APG	Assists per game	SPG	Steals per game
BPG	Blocks per game	PPG	Points per game	**Bold**	Career high

Year	School	GP	GS	MPG	FG%	3P%	FT%	RPG	APG	SPG	BPG	PPG
2010–11	Notre Dame	**39**	0	18.3	0.566	**0.500**	0.571	5.3	1.1	0.8	0.4	6.9
2011–12	Notre Dame	36	1	17.2	0.520	0.300	0.720	4.4	1.4	0.7	0.8	7.6
2012–13	Notre Dame	37	**37**	**27.1**	0.520	0.000	**0.800**	**9.5**	2.3	**1.1**	0.9	13.8
2013–14	Notre Dame	33	33	25.4	**0.611**	0.000	0.709	7.7	**2.8**	1.0	**1.2**	**14.9**
Total	Notre Dame	145	71	21.9	0.562	0.357	0.723	6.7	1.9	0.9	0.8	10.7

== Professional career ==
=== WNBA ===
==== Indiana Fever (2015–2020) ====
Achonwa was drafted ninth overall by the Indiana Fever in the 2014 WNBA draft. She sat out the entire 2014 WNBA season due to a left knee injury she suffered during her senior year at Notre Dame in the NCAA playoffs. In the fall of 2014, while continuing her rehab, Achonwa took a job as the interim Director of Operations for the Notre Dame women's basketball program. She was filling in for the incumbent Katie Schwab, who was hospitalized with a life-threatening illness.

Achonwa did not sign her rookie contract with the Fever until February 2015, once she recovered from her injury. She returned to the court in time for the 2015 WNBA season. She was a backup center on the Fever roster in her rookie season, averaging eight ppg and 3.5 rpg in 28 games with 17 starts. The Fever finished third place in the East with a 20–14 record. By the end of the season, Achonwa was named to the WNBA All-Rookie Team. Led by their two all-stars Tamika Catchings and Marissa Coleman, the Fever advanced to the Finals facing off against the Minnesota Lynx but lost the series 3–2.

In the 2016 WNBA season, Achonwa had a reduced role on the Fever's roster playing 24 games while coming off the bench with limited minutes. The Fever made it to the playoffs again but was eliminated in the first-round elimination game by the Phoenix Mercury.

During the 2017 season, Achonwa played a full 34 games for the first time in her career while starting in 17 of those games, averaging 7.1 ppg and 3.7 rpg. However, the Fever finished as the second-worst team in the league with a 9–25 record.

In the 2018 season, Achonwa became a full-time starter for the Fever and played all 34 games, averaging career-highs in scoring and rebound with her new role, but the Fever would continue their losing ways, finishing 6–28 as the worst team in the league.

In 2019, Achonwa re-signed with the Fever as a restricted free agent. She played 30 games and would start in 18 of the games played during the season. The Fever had an improved season but fell short of making the playoffs with a 13–21 record.

In 2020, the season was delayed and shortened to 22 games in a bubble at IMG Academy due to the COVID-19 pandemic. Achonwa played 18 games and started in 11, but the Fever would again miss out on the playoffs with a 6–16 record, finishing as the second-worst team in the league.

==== Minnesota Lynx (2021–2023) ====
On January 28, 2021, Achonwa signed a multi-year deal with the Minnesota Lynx in free agency.

=== Overseas ===
In the 2015–16 off-season, Achonwa played in Italy for Dike Napoli. In November 2016, Achonwa signed with Bucheon KEB Hana Bank, a South Korean club, for the 2016–17 off-season. In 2017, Achonwa signed with Asan Woori Bank Wibee of the South Korean league for the 2017–18 WNBA off-season. In 2018, Achonwa signed with Jiangsu Phoenix of the Chinese league for the 2018–19 WNBA off-season. In 2019, Achonwa signed with Tango Bourges Basket of the French league for the 2019–20 WNBA off-season. In 2020, Achonwa signed with Famila Schio of the Italian league for the 2020–21 WNBA off-season.

== International career ==
At age 16, Achonwa became the youngest player to ever play on the Canadian national team in 2009. She competed in the 2012 Summer Olympics as well as the 2010 FIBA World Championship for Women.

Achonwa was invited to join the national team, to play in the 2013 FIBA Americas Championship for Women, held in Xalapa, Mexico from September 21–28, 2013. She averaged 7.5 points per game and helped the Canadian National team to a second place, silver medal finish. Canada faced Cuba in a preliminary round and won 53–40, but in the championship game, Cuba prevailed 79–71.

She missed the 2014 FIBA World Championship for Women due to injury.

Achonwa was invited to play for Canada at the 2016 Summer Olympics, making it her second Olympic appearance.

She played for Canada at the 2018 FIBA Women's Basketball World Cup.

Achonwa was invited to play for Canada at the 2020 Summer Olympics.

She made her fourth and final Olympic appearance at the 2024 Summer Olympics in Paris, the most by a Canadian basketball player. In total she played in 79 career games for Canada's national squad, the second-most in team history, joining the team when she was 16.

=== Pan Am games 2015 ===
Achonwa was a member of the Canada women's national basketball team, which participated in basketball at the 2015 Pan American Games held in Toronto, Ontario, Canada July 10 to 26, 2015. Canada opened the preliminary rounds with an easy 101–38 win over Venezuela. The following day they beat Argentina 73–58. The final preliminary game was against Cuba; both teams were 2–0, so the winner would win the group. The game went down to the wire, with Canada eking out a 71–68 win. Canada would face Brazil in the semifinal.

Canada went on to beat Brazil 91–63 to earn a spot in the gold-medal game against the USA.

The gold-medal game matched the host team Canada against the US in a sold-out arena dominated by fans in red and white and waving the Canadian flag. The Canadian team, arm in arm, sang "Oh Canada" as the respective national anthems were played.

After trading baskets early, the US edged to a double-digit lead in the second quarter. However, the Canadians, spurred on by the home crowd cheering, fought back and tied up the game at halftime. It was Canada's time to shine in the third quarter as they outscored the US 26–15. The lead would reach as high as 18 points. The USA fought back, but not all the way and Canada won the game and the gold medal 81–73. It was Canada's first gold medal in basketball in the Pan Am games. Achonwa contributed 13 points and two rebounds.

== Coaching career ==
On September 10, 2024, Achonwa was named an assistant coach for player development at Michigan. She coached two seasons before she was named an assistant coach for the Seattle Storm on February 18, 2026. She would remain with Michigan until the end of the college season.

== WNBA career statistics ==
Legend
GP	Games played	GS	Games started	MPG	Minutes per game	RPG	Rebounds per game
APG	Assists per game	SPG	Steals per game	BPG	Blocks per game	PPG	Points per game
TO	Turnovers per game	FG%	Field-goal percentage	3P%	3-point field-goal percentage	FT%	Free-throw percentage
**Bold**	Career best	°	League leader

=== Regular season ===
Year	Team	GP	GS	MPG	FG%	3P%	FT%	RPG	APG	SPG	BPG	TO	PPG
2015	Indiana	28	17	17.3	.550	.000	.746	3.5	0.6	0.5	0.5	1.3	8.0
2016	Indiana	24	0	8.1	.545	.000	.700	2.0	0.3	0.4	0.0	**0.5**	3.6
2017	Indiana	**34**	17	18.3	**.557**	.000	.763	3.7	0.7	0.4	0.5	0.9	7.1
2018	Indiana	**34**	**34**	**26.0**	.527	.000	.800	**6.9**	1.4	**0.9**	**0.7**	1.1	**10.3**
2019	Indiana	30	18	21.1	.488	**.250**	**.909**	5.2	1.6	0.7	**0.7**	0.9	8.7
2020	Indiana	18	11	20.2	.496	.000	.813	5.5	**1.7**	0.5	0.6	1.8	7.8
2021	Minnesota	21	1	12.0	.496	.000	.813	2.1	1.2	0.6	0.2	0.6	3.7
2022	Minnesota	22	0	15.1	.516	.000	.815	4.1	**1.7**	0.4	0.3	1.0	5.3
Career	8 years, 2 teams	211	98	17.9	.519	.120	.808	4.2	1.1	0.5	0.5	1.0	7.1

=== Postseason ===
Year	Team	GP	GS	MPG	FG%	3P%	FT%	RPG	APG	SPG	BPG	TO	PPG
2015	Indiana	**6**	**1**	7.0	.267	.000	.500	1.5	0.3	0.0	0.1	1.1	1.8
2016	Indiana	1	0	8.7	.667	.000	.000	4.0	0.0	0.0	0.0	0.0	4.0
2021	Minnesota	1	0	11.0	.667	.000	.000	2.0	0.0	0.0	0.0	1.0	4.0
Career	3 years, 2 teams	8	1	7.8	.381	.000	.500	1.9	0.4	0.0	0.1	1.0	2.4

== Personal life ==
Achonwa's father immigrated from Nigeria to Canada when he was twelve. She is 6 feet 3 inches (191 cm) tall.
