= Jiangsu Phoenix =

- League: Women's Chinese Basketball Association
- Arena: Liyang Stadium (since 2018)
- Capacity: 4,500
- Location: Liyang, Jiangsu (since 2018)
- Main sponsor: Niushoushan Cultural Tourism Zone (since 2017)

Jiangsu Phoenix is a Chinese professional women's basketball club based in Jiangsu, playing in the Women's Chinese Basketball Association (WCBA).

== Season-by-season records ==
Season	Corporate Sponsor	Home City	Final Rank	Record (including playoffs)			Head coach
Season	Corporate Sponsor	Home City	Final Rank	W	L	%	Head coach
2002	Jiangsu Communications Industry Group; Jiangsu Coing Special Asphalt	Nanjing	11th	2	12	14.3	Zhang Hui
2002–03	Jiangsu Communications Industry Group; Jiangsu Coing Special Asphalt	Danyang	6th	9	9	50.0	Xiong Yan
2004	Suning Universal	Jiangdu	4th	7	7	50.0	Xiong Yan
2004–05	Suning Universal; Tongxi Group	Danyang	3rd	15	6	71.4	Xiong Yan
2005–06	Jiangsu Guoxin	Jintan	7th	10	14	41.7	Xiong Yan
2007	Dahua Group	Nanjing	5th	6	7	46.2	Xiong Yan
2007–08	DP-Master Manufacturing	Yixing	7th	7	11	38.9	Xiong Yan
2008–09	DP-Master Manufacturing	Yixing	4th	17	10	63.0	Xiong Yan
2009–10	DP-Master Manufacturing	Yixing	7th	11	13	45.8	Ding Tie
2010–11	Nanjing Iron and Steel Company	Yixing; Donghai County	5th	14	10	58.3	Ding Tie
2011–12	Jiangsu Yonggang (Jiangsu Yonglian)	Xinghua	6th	14	10	58.3	Ding Tie
2012–13	Jiangsu Yonggang (Jiangsu Yonglian)	Xinghua	7th	14	10	58.3	Ding Tie
2013–14	Jiangsu Yonggang (Jiangsu Yonglian)	Zhangjiagang	9th	9	13	40.9	Ding Tie
2014–15	Jiangsu Yonggang (Jiangsu Yonglian)	Zhangjiagang; Nanjing	3rd	20	14	58.9	Ding Tie
2015–16	Shouyoucai Mobile Game	Zhangjiagang; Nanjing	10th	21	13	61.8	Ding Tie
2016–17	Did not qualify / participate						Ding Tie
2017–18	Niushoushan Cultural Tourism Zone	Nanjing	6th	15	14	51.7	Ding Tie
2018–19	Niushoushan Cultural Tourism Zone	Liyang	3rd	31	10	75.6	Ding Tie

== Current players ==
2018–19 Jiangsu Phoenix roster
Players
Coaches

Pos.	No.	Nat.	Name	Ht.	Wt.
F	1	(China)	Tang Yue	1.78 m (5 ft 10 in)	67 kg (148 lb)
F	3	(China)	Li Qingyun	1.85 m (6 ft 1 in)	84 kg (185 lb)
PG	5	(China)	Zhang Manman	1.75 m (5 ft 9 in)	63 kg (139 lb)
G	7	(China)	Chen Xiaojia	1.82 m (6 ft 0 in)	70 kg (154 lb)
G	8	(China)	Jin Weina	1.81 m (5 ft 11 in)	61 kg (134 lb)
SF	9	(China)	Jiang Jiayin	1.80 m (5 ft 11 in)	72 kg (159 lb)
SF	10	(China)	Sun Lirui	1.82 m (6 ft 0 in)	65 kg (143 lb)
PF	11	(Canada)	Natalie Achonwa	1.92 m (6 ft 4 in)	85 kg (187 lb)
SF	12	(China)	Gong Li	1.85 m (6 ft 1 in)	78 kg (172 lb)
C	15	(China)	Xu Chenyan	1.99 m (6 ft 6 in)	97 kg (214 lb)
F	16	(China)	Sun Li	1.85 m (6 ft 1 in)	79 kg (174 lb)
G	19	(China)	Zhao Yuheng	1.75 m (5 ft 9 in)	68 kg (150 lb)
SF	20	(China)	Ma Wen	1.77 m (5 ft 10 in)	67 kg (148 lb)
G	21	(China)	Hu Xinyu	1.75 m (5 ft 9 in)	66 kg (146 lb)
PF	23	(United States)	Bernice Mosby	1.85 m (6 ft 1 in)	78 kg (172 lb)

Head coach

- (China) Ding Tie

Assistant coach(es)

- (China) Chen Shengping

Legend

- (C) Team captain
- Injured

== Notable former players ==
- (United States) Angel White (2002)
- (United States) Latasha Byears (2002)
- (United States) Denique Graves (2002)
- (United States) LaQuanda Barksdale (2002)
- (United States) Asjha Jones (2004–05)
- (United States) Ann Strother (2008)
- (United States) Adrian Williams-Strong (2008–09)
- (United States) Shyra Ely (2009–10)
- (United States) KeKe Carrier (2010–11)
- (United States) Erica Davis (2011)
- (United States) Amy Jaeschke (2011–12)
- (United States) Krystal Thomas (2012–13)
- (United States) Erlana Larkins (2013–14)
- (Belarus) Yelena Leuchanka (2014–15)
- (United States) Jessica Breland (2015–16)
- (Russia) Viktoria Medvedeva (2017–18)
- (Chinese Taipei) Cheng Hui-yun (2004–05)
- (China) Bian Lan (2002–09, 2014–15)
- (China) Li Shanshan (2005–18)
- (China) Zhang Xiaoni (2012–13)
