= Heilongjiang Dragons =

Basketball team in Daqing, China

- League: Women's Chinese Basketball Association
- Established: 1997
- Arena: Daqing Stadium (since 2016)
- Location: Daqing, Heilongjiang (since 2014)
- Affiliation: Daqing Rural Commercial Bank

Heilongjiang Dragons (Chinese: 华龙女篮; pinyin: Huálóng Nǚlán) is a Chinese professional women's basketball club based in Daqing, Heilongjiang, playing in the Women's Chinese Basketball Association (WCBA).

Created by Jiang Zuozhi in the 1990s, it is the oldest Women's basketball team in China.

The club has formed several important players, including Miao Lijie, Ma Zongqing, Liu Yutong, and others.

== Season-by-season records ==
Season	Corporate Sponsor	Home City	Final Rank	Record (including playoffs)			Head coach
Season	Corporate Sponsor	Home City	Final Rank	W	L	%	Head coach
2002	Harbin	Harbin	4th	8	6	57.1	(China) Jiang Zuozhi
2002–03	Harbin	Harbin	4th	14	10	58.3	(China) Jiang Tianbao
2004	Heilongjiang Chenergy Investment	Harbin	2nd	10	8	55.6	(China) Jiang Zuozhi
2004–05	Heilongjiang Chenergy Investment	Harbin	4th	13	7	65.0	(China) Jiang Zuozhi
2005–06	Heilongjiang Chenergy Investment	Harbin	4th	20	7	74.1	(China) Jiang Zuozhi
2007	Harbin Pharmaceutical Group	Harbin	4th	9	6	60.0	(China) Jiang Changyong
2007–08	Harbin Pharmaceutical Group	Harbin	4th	12	8	60.0	(China) Jiang Changyong
2008–09	Harbin Pharmaceutical Group	Harbin	7th	12	12	50.0	(China) Jiang Changyong
2009–10	Harbin Pharmaceutical Group	Harbin	10th	6	16	27.3	(China) Jiang Changyong
2010–11	Fengshen Group; (Heilongjiang Shenda)	Harbin	10th	8	14	36.4	(China) Jiang Changyong
2011–12	Fengshen Group; (Heilongjiang Shenda)	Harbin	8th	11	13	45.8	(China) Dong Zhiquan
2012–13	Fengshen Group; (Heilongjiang Shenda)	Harbin	12th	3	19	13.6	(China) Li Guangqi
2013–14	Fengshen Group; (Heilongjiang Shenda)	Harbin	7th	11	13	45.8	(Chinese Taipei) Liu Chia-fa
2014–15	Fengshen Group; (Heilongjiang Shenda)	Daqing	12th	7	9	43.8	(China) Zou Yuduo
2015–16	Fengshen Group; (Heilongjiang Shenda)	Daqing	12th	6	26	18.8	(China) Li Guangqi
2016–17	Daqing Rural Commercial Bank	Daqing	9th	17	17	50.0	(China) Zou Yuduo
2017–18	Daqing Rural Commercial Bank	Daqing; Harbin	7th	15	14	51.7	(China) Ji Yanyan
2018–19	Daqing Rural Commercial Bank	Daqing; Harbin	11th	13	21	38.2	(China) Ji Yanyan

== Current players ==
2018–19 Heilongjiang Dragons roster
Players
Coaches

Pos.	No.	Nat.	Name	Ht.	Wt.
PF	4	(China)	Liu Jiacen	1.90 m (6 ft 3 in)	87 kg (192 lb)
C	5	(China)	Cao Liqing	1.90 m (6 ft 3 in)	101 kg (223 lb)
SF	7	(China)	Zhang Jiahe	1.83 m (6 ft 0 in)	74 kg (163 lb)
F	8	(China)	Sui Xin	1.82 m (6 ft 0 in)	62 kg (137 lb)
C	9	(China)	Huang Zichun	1.90 m (6 ft 3 in)	75 kg (165 lb)
PG	10	(China)	Fan Jieyi	1.71 m (5 ft 7 in)	61 kg (134 lb)
F	11	(China)	Liu Baoying	1.82 m (6 ft 0 in)	72 kg (159 lb)
SG	12	(China)	Ji Yanyan	1.82 m (6 ft 0 in)	63 kg (139 lb)
PG	13	(China)	Zhang Xiangjun	1.72 m (5 ft 8 in)	62 kg (137 lb)
F	15	(China)	Zhou Zhou	1.80 m (5 ft 11 in)	70 kg (154 lb)
F	16	(China)	Yang Wenyu	1.79 m (5 ft 10 in)	70 kg (154 lb)
F	17	(China)	Lei Tiancong	1.79 m (5 ft 10 in)	64 kg (141 lb)
SF	18	(China)	Zou Qijia	1.79 m (5 ft 10 in)	67 kg (148 lb)
F	20	(China)	Wang Jing	1.83 m (6 ft 0 in)	78 kg (172 lb)
C	25	(United States)	Monique Billings	1.93 m (6 ft 4 in)	82 kg (181 lb)

Head coach

- (China) Ji Yanyan

Assistant coach(es)

- (China) Zhu Yongfu
- (China) Han Fangyu

Legend

- (C) Team captain
- Injured

== Notable former players ==
- (United States) (Nigeria) Mfon Udoka (2002–03)
- (United States) Monique Ambers (2004–06)
- (United States) Jessica Davenport (2009–10)
- (United States) Chasity Melvin (2010–11)
- (United States) Rashidat Junaid (2011–12)
- (United States) Sasha Goodlett (2012–13)
- (United States) Abi Olajuwon (2013)
- (Australia) Lauren Jackson (2013–14)
- (France) Isabelle Yacoubou (2014–15)
- (United States) Vicky McIntyre (2015–16)
- (United States) Crystal Langhorne (2016–17)
- (Jamaica) Aneika Henry (2017–18)
- (Chinese Taipei) Ma Yi-hung (2009–10, 2012–13)
- (North Korea) Kim Hyang (2012–13)
- (South Korea) Kim Yeong-ok (2013–14)
- (China) Miao Lijie (2002–09)
- (China) Song Liwei (2002–08)
- (China) Gao Song (2007–12)
