= Glory Johnson =

American basketball player (born 1990)

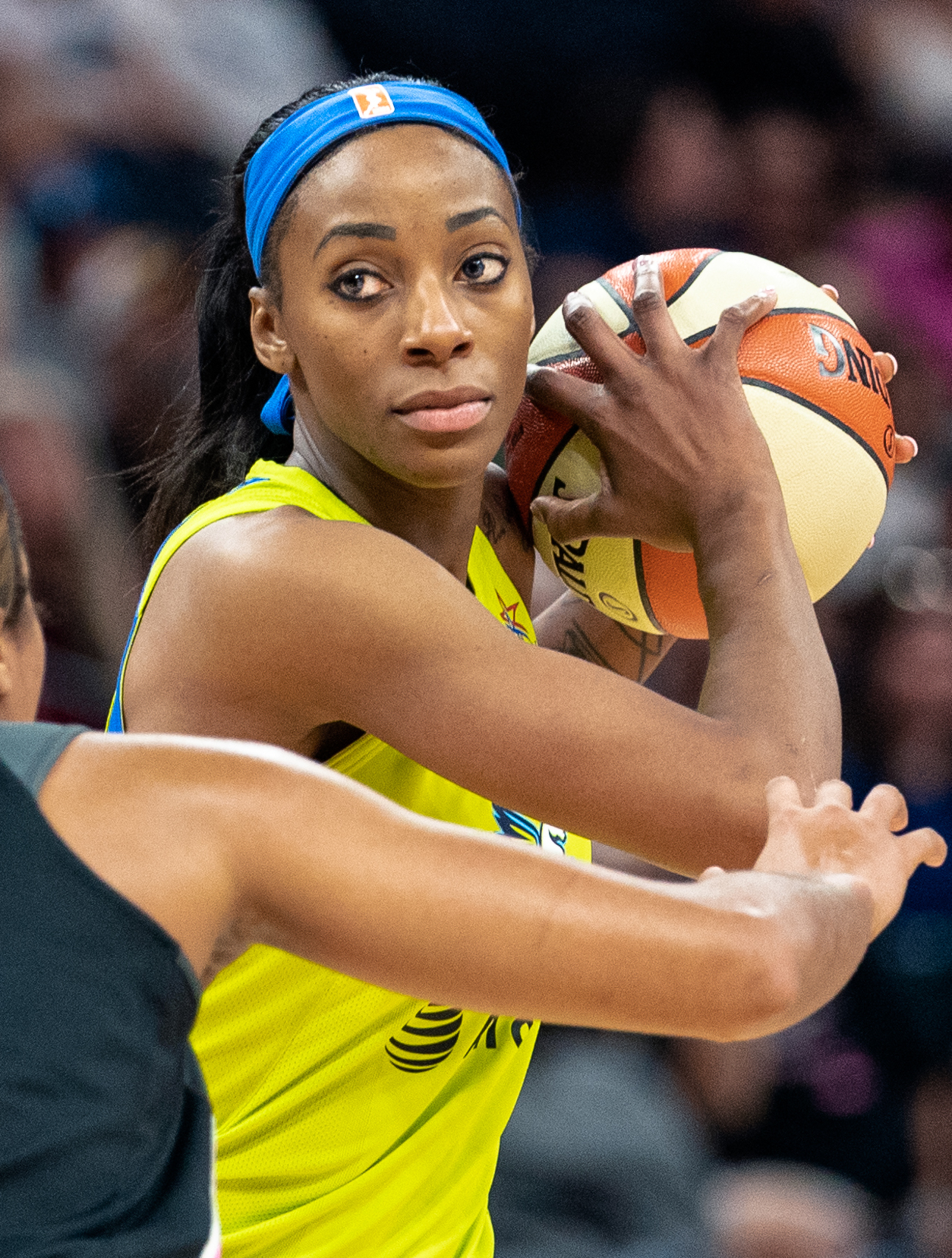
- Johnson in 2019

Personal information
- Born: July 27, 1990 (age 36) Colorado Springs, Colorado, U.S.
- Listed height: 6 ft 3 in (1.91 m)
- Listed weight: 170 lb (77 kg)

Career information
- High school: Webb School (Knoxville, Tennessee)
- College: Tennessee (2008–2012)
- WNBA draft: 2012: 1st round, 4th overall pick
- Drafted by: Tulsa Shock
- Playing career: 2012–present
- Position: Power forward

Career history
- 2012–2019: Tulsa Shock / Dallas Wings
- 2012–2013: Chevakata Vologda
- 2013–2015: Nadezhda Orenburg
- 2016–2017: Xinjiang Tiashan Deers
- 2017: Canik Belediyespor
- 2017–2018: Guangdong Dolphins
- 2018: Hatay BB
- 2019: Xinjiang Magic Deer
- 2019–2020: Dynamo Kursk
- 2020: Atlanta Dream
- 2020: Sopron Basket
- 2021: Kayseri Basketbol
- 2021: Elitzur Ramla
- 2021–2022: Beşiktaş

Career highlights
- 2× WNBA All-Star (2013, 2014); All-Defensive Second-team (2013); All-Rookie Team (2012); SEC Defensive Player of the Year (2012); SEC Tournament MVP (2012); WBCA Coaches' All-American (2012); 2× SEC All-Defensive Team (2011, 2012); 2× First-team All-SEC (2011, 2012); SEC All-Freshman Team (2009); McDonald's All-American (2008); 2× Tennessee Miss Basketball (2007, 2008)
- Stats at WNBA.com
- Stats at Basketball Reference
Medals
Women's basketball
Representing United States
World University Games
Gold medal – first place	2011 Shenzhen	Team

Glory Bassey Johnson (born July 27, 1990) is an American basketball player who last played for Turkish club Beşiktaş. Born in Colorado Springs, Colorado, she went to Webb School Of Knoxville and played collegiately for the University of Tennessee Lady Vols. She holds a Montenegrin passport and has represented the Montenegro national team internationally.

== College career ==
Johnson enrolled at the University of Tennessee-Knoxville in 2008. She recorded 36 double-doubles over the course of her college career.

Johnson completed her bachelor's degree in global studies in three years, and earned a master's degree in communications during her fourth year of basketball eligibility.

=== College statistics ===
Legend
GP	Games played	GS	Games started	MPG	Minutes per game
FG%	Field goal percentage	3P%	3-point field goal percentage	FT%	Free throw percentage
RPG	Rebounds per game	APG	Assists per game	SPG	Steals per game
BPG	Blocks per game	PPG	Points per game	**Bold**	Career high

Year	Team	GP	Points	FG%	3P%	FT%	RPG	APG	SPG	BPG	PPG
2008–09	Tennessee	33	335	40.4	–	61.6	7.2	0.6	1.1	0.4	10.2
2009–10	Tennessee	35	354	45.8	**100.0**	**64.8**	7.7	1.0	1.3	0.3	10.1
2010–11	Tennessee	**37**	443	53.4	–	58.6	9.7	**1.2**	**1.4**	0.8	12.0
2011–12	Tennessee	36	**511**	**53.8**	50.0	63.6	**9.9**	1.1	**1.4**	**1.1**	**14.2**
Career	Tennessee	141	1643	48.8	40.0	61.9	8.6	1.0	1.3	0.7	11.7

== USA Basketball ==
Johnson played on the team representing the US at the 2011 Summer Universiade held in Shenzhen, China. The team won all six games to earn the gold medal. Johnson scored 6.2 points per game and had nine steals, tied for second place on the team.

== Professional career ==
=== WNBA ===
Johnson was selected in the first round of the 2012 WNBA draft (4th overall) by the Tulsa Shock. In her rookie season, she was ranked fourth in steals per game (a career-high 2.1 spg).

In 2013 and 2014, her second and third seasons with the Shock, Johnson was named in the Western Conference All-Star team.

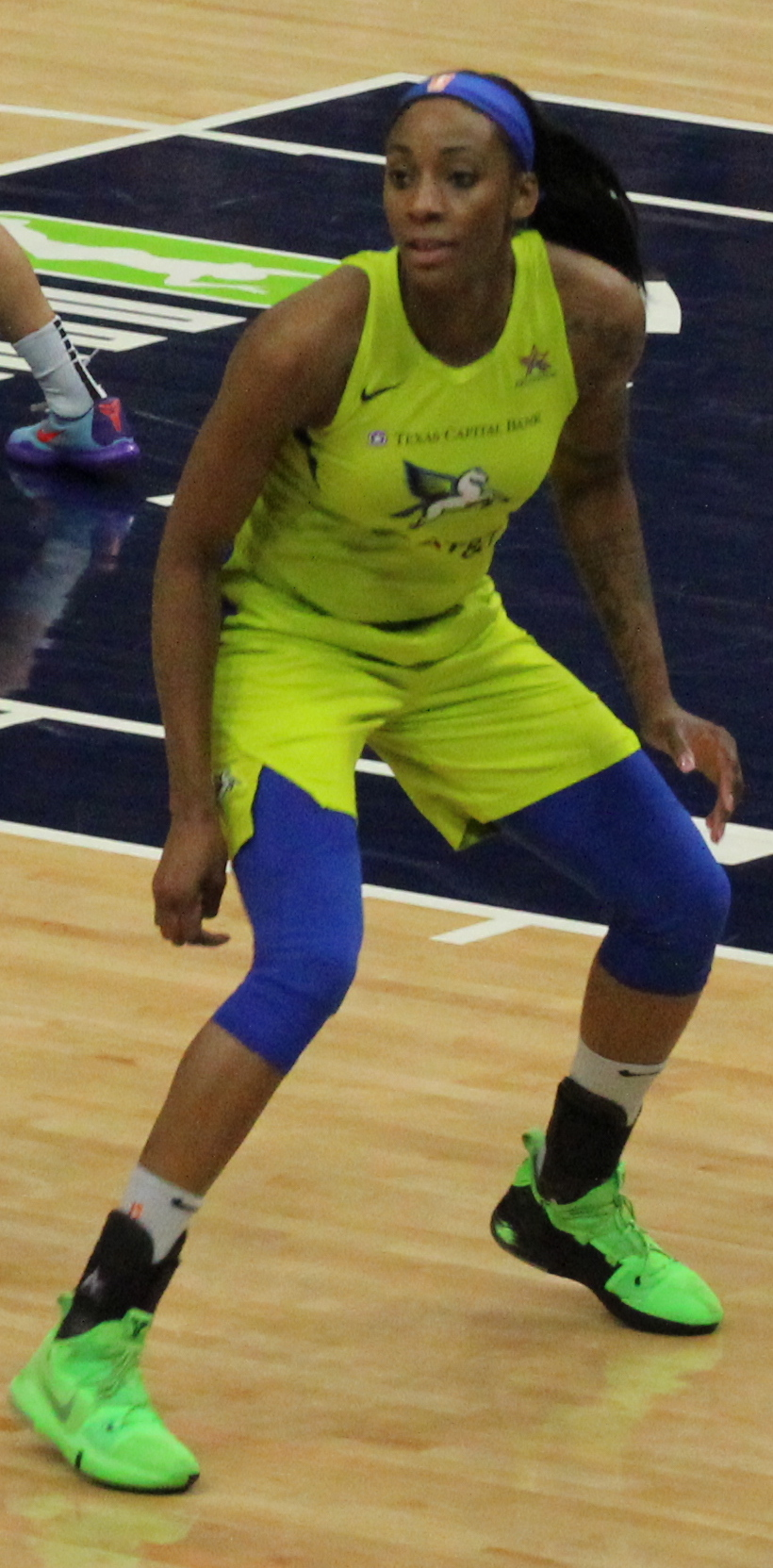
Johnson in 2019

Johnson sat out the 2015 WNBA season on a maternity leave after announcing her pregnancy.

She returned one month into the 2016 WNBA season after her suspension stemming from her domestic violence incident with Brittney Griner. By this time the Tulsa Shock had relocated to Dallas and were renamed the Dallas Wings, Johnson had re-signed with the team during free agency. Johnson averaged 11.3 ppg in 18 games with 6 starts. Also during her comeback season, she recorded the league's 16th 20-point, 20-rebound performance of the season in a win against the Phoenix Mercury when she scored 23 points along with a career-high 22 rebounds.

During the 2017 season, Johnson continued to put double-doubles in rebounds and points which is what she has become statistically known for earlier on in her career. On June 18, 2017, Johnson scored a season-high 27 points in an 87–83 win over the Washington Mystics. From July 31 to August 6, Johnson was named the Western Conference player of the week. On August 19, 2017, Johnson recorded her 13th double-double of the season, scoring 23 points along with 13 rebounds in a 90–86 win over the Atlanta Dream. During the game, Johnson threw a punch at Dream's point guard Matee Ajavon and served a one-game suspension two days later. The Wings would finish with a 16–18 record and the number 7 seed in the league. In her first career playoff game, Johnson scored 15 points and grabbed 14 rebounds in a losing effort to the Washington Mystics in the first round elimination game.

The 2018 season proved challenging for Johnson, with several injuries sidelining her for a brief time. The injuries and subsequent recovery period led to her coming off the bench for a number of games. In total, Johnson played 29 games with 17 starts and averaged career-lows in scoring and rebounding. The Wings went on to make the playoffs with a 15–19 record, and finished with the 8th seed in the league. They would once again be a first-round exit, after losing to the Phoenix Mercury.

=== Overseas ===
From 2012 to 2015, Johnson played three off-seasons in Russia for two different teams; Chevakata Vologda and Nadezhda Orenburg. As of November 2016, Johnson signed with the Xinjiang Tiashan Deers of the WCBA for the 2016–17 off-season. In August 2018, Johnson signed with Hatay BB of the Turkish League for the 2018–19 off-season.

== Personal life ==
On August 14, 2014, it was announced that Johnson and fellow WNBA player Brittney Griner were engaged. On April 22, 2015, both women were arrested for physically attacking each other after police broke up a fight between the two in their Goodyear, Arizona, home. Both sustained minor injuries during the incident. Nevertheless, they stayed together and married on May 8, 2015. It was announced on June 4, 2015, that Johnson was pregnant and that she would miss the 2015 WNBA season. One day later, Griner filed for annulment which was rejected. Johnson gave birth to twin girls in October 2015, 16 weeks premature. The twins were conceived by IVF treatment using her eggs and a sperm donation. The divorce was finalized in June 2016.

== WNBA career statistics ==
Legend
GP	Games played	GS	Games started	MPG	Minutes per game	RPG	Rebounds per game
APG	Assists per game	SPG	Steals per game	BPG	Blocks per game	PPG	Points per game
TO	Turnovers per game	FG%	Field-goal percentage	3P%	3-point field-goal percentage	FT%	Free-throw percentage
**Bold**	Career best	°	League leader

=== Regular season ===
Year	Team	GP	GS	MPG	FG%	3P%	FT%	RPG	APG	SPG	BPG	TO	PPG
2012	Tulsa	**34**	28	28.2	**.482**	.000	.677	6.8	1.1	**2.1**	0.5	2.0	11.5
2013	Tulsa	29	28	30.2	.446	.333	.747	8.9	1.1	1.0	0.4	2.0	**15.0**
2014	Tulsa	33	**33**	**32.4**	.449	.000	.760	**9.2**	1.4	1.3	0.3	2.6	14.7
2016	Dallas	18	6	27.9	.442	.286	.753	8.9	1.3	0.9	**0.6**	1.4	11.3
2017	Dallas	33	**33**	31.0	.464	.313	.766	9.1	**1.6**	1.2	0.3	2.2	14.9
2018	Dallas	29	17	22.5	.417	.315	**.780**	6.0	1.3	1.0	0.4	1.3	8.0
2019	Dallas	28	19	24.1	.364	**.340**	.583	5.1	1.4	1.4	**0.6**	1.0	7.3
2020	Atlanta	18	1	15.4	.373	.262	.500	3.7	0.6	0.8	0.4	**0.7**	4.7
Career	8 years, 2 teams	222	165	27.2	.440	.311	.728	7.4	1.3	1.3	0.5	1.8	11.4

=== Playoffs ===
Year	Team	GP	GS	MPG	FG%	3P%	FT%	RPG	APG	SPG	BPG	TO	PPG
2017	Dallas	1	1	**36.8**	.375	.000	**.750**	**14.0**	0.0	**1.0**	**1.0**	**1.0**	**15.0**
2018	Dallas	1	1	22.1	**.500**	**.333**	.000	5.0	**2.0**	**1.0**	0.0	**1.0**	7.0
Career	2 years, 1 team	2	2	29.4	.409	.250	.750	9.5	1.0	1.0	0.5	1.0	11.0
