= Shanghai Swordfish =

Shanghai Baoshan Dahua Swordfish
- League: Women's Chinese Basketball Association
- History: Shanghai Octopus (2002–14); Shanghai Swordfish (2014–present)
- Arena: 1. Baoshan Sports Centre; 2. Baosteel Sports Centre
- Location: Shanghai
- Affiliations: Shanghai Sports Institute; Baoshan District Sports Bureau; Dahua Group

Shanghai Baoshan Dahua Swordfish is a Chinese professional women's basketball club based in Shanghai, playing in the Women's Chinese Basketball Association (WCBA). It is co-owned by Baoshan District government, Shanghai Sports Institute, and Dahua Group. Before 2014 it was known as Shanghai Octopus, affiliated with the Shanghai Media Group. Between 2007 and 2008 it was sponsored by the Xiyang Group.

== Season-by-season records ==
Season	Final Rank	Record (including playoffs)			Head coach
Season	Final Rank	W	L	%	Head coach
Shanghai Octopus
2002	7th	4	8	33.3	(China) Cong Xuedi
2002–03	11th	6	14	30.0	(China) Yang Zhengming
2004	10th	5	7	41.7	(China) Yang Zhengming
2004–05	7th	7	11	38.9	(China) Yang Zhengming
2005–06	12th	2	20	9.1	(China) Zheng Fugen; (China) Cong Xuedi
2007	10th	3	10	23.1	(China) Cong Xuedi
2007–08	10th	5	13	27.8	(China) Cong Xuedi
2008–09	11th	4	18	18.2	(China) Cong Xuedi
2009–10	9th	9	13	40.9	(China) Cong Xuedi
2010–11	11th	6	16	27.3	(China) Cong Xuedi
2011–12	4th	18	10	64.3	(China) Liu Peng
2012–13	6th	13	11	54.2	(China) Liu Peng
2013–14	3rd	21	6	77.8	(China) Liu Peng
Shanghai Baoshan Dahua Swordfish
2014–15	6th	19	12	61.3	(South Korea) Lee Moon-kyu
2015–16	3rd	25	13	65.8	(South Korea) Lee Moon-kyu
2016–17	5th	24	11	68.6	(South Korea) Lee Moon-kyu
2017–18	3rd	21	11	65.6	(Chinese Taipei) Cheng Chih-lung
2018–19	7th	20	17	54.1	(Serbia) Marina Maljković

== Current players ==
2018–19 Shanghai Swordfish roster
Players
Coaches

Pos.	No.	Nat.	Name	Ht.	Wt.
PG	3	(China)	Shen Binbin	1.78 m (5 ft 10 in)	70 kg (154 lb)
G	5	(China)	Li Yingyun	1.73 m (5 ft 8 in)	73 kg (161 lb)
SF	6	(China)	Huang Jing	1.84 m (6 ft 0 in)	70 kg (154 lb)
F	7	(China)	Zhang Jingdan	1.83 m (6 ft 0 in)	70 kg (154 lb)
F	8	(China)	Ma Yufang	1.76 m (5 ft 9 in)	70 kg (154 lb)
F	9	(China)	Pan Xuemei	1.76 m (5 ft 9 in)	67 kg (148 lb)
C	10	(China)	Zhang Zhiting	1.95 m (6 ft 5 in)	97 kg (214 lb)
C	11	(Montenegro)	Jelena Dubljević	1.90 m (6 ft 3 in)	81 kg (179 lb)
C	12	(China)	Han Xu	1.90 m (6 ft 3 in)	75 kg (165 lb)
C	13	(China)	Zhang Zhixin	1.83 m (6 ft 0 in)	74 kg (163 lb)
PF	14	(China)	Gong Yun	1.83 m (6 ft 0 in)	80 kg (176 lb)
SF	16	(China)	Zhou Yuyan	1.78 m (5 ft 10 in)	71 kg (157 lb)
SG	17	(Chinese Taipei)	Chen Yu-chun	1.76 m (5 ft 9 in)	72 kg (159 lb)
SF	19	(China)	Bao Meng	1.82 m (6 ft 0 in)	74 kg (163 lb)
F	20	(China)	Ding Kangchen	1.80 m (5 ft 11 in)	70 kg (154 lb)
C	10	(Brazil)	Kamilla Cardoso	2.00 m (6 ft 7 in)	97 kg (214 lb)

Head coach

- (Serbia) Marina Maljković

Assistant coach(es)

- (China) Wang Ligang
- (China) Xu Jiamin

Legend

- (C) Team captain
- Injured

== Notable former players ==
- (Australia) Tracey Braithwaite (2002)
- (United States) Tamara Stocks (2002–03)
- (United States) (Nigeria) Ugo Oha (2004–05)
- (United States) Camille Little (2011–13)
- (United States) Sylvia Fowles (2013–15)
- (Australia) Liz Cambage (2015–16)
- (United States) Breanna Stewart (2016–18)
- (Chinese Taipei) Peng Szu-chin (2014–15, 2017–18)
- (Chinese Taipei) Wei Yu-chun (2015–16)
- (China) Ye Li (2004–05)
- (China) Shi Xiufeng (2005–16)
