= Guangdong Vermilion Birds =

- League: Women's Chinese Basketball Association
- History: Guangdong Kapok (2002–07); Guangdong Dolphins (2007–18); Guangdong Vermilion Birds (2018–present)
- Arena: Dalang Arena (since 2015)
- Capacity: 4,000
- Location: Dongguan, Guangdong (since 2012)
- Main sponsor: Guangdong Xintongsheng
- Head coach: Huang Sijing
- Championships: 2 (2019, 2025)

Guangdong Vermilion Birds is a Chinese professional women's basketball club based in Dongguan, Guangdong, playing in the Women's Chinese Basketball Association (WCBA). It was known as Guangdong Dolphins from 2007–2018 and Guangdong Kapok before 2007.

The Vermilion Bird is a mythical creature in Chinese culture.

== History ==
The team was founded in 1954 as the Guangdong women's basketball team. The team has a long and rich history and has won numerous accolades over the years. In 2017, the Guangdong women's basketball team won the first National Games championship. In 2018, the team helped the men's basketball women's basketball team win the championship at the Asian Games. Both the men's and women's three-man basketball teams also won gold at the Asian Games. In 2019, the Guangdong women's basketball team was renamed Dongguan Vermilion Birds Women's Basketball. That same year, the team won the WCBA League championship for the first time, achieving the double glory of the 2019 Dongguan Men's and Women's Basketball League.

In 2023, the team won the 10th "Guangdong Youth May Fourth Medal" collective award, which is the first time that the team has been honored with this award.

The team changed its name from Guangdong women's basketball team to Dongguan Vermilion Birds Women's Basketball Team and its logo from "Dolphin" to "Suzaku", which means auspicious, brave, and powerful.

The team held a meeting for the new season in 2018, and Liu Kejun, vice chairman of the Chinese Basketball Association and president of the Provincial Basketball Association, Huang Huihong, director of the Municipal Sports Bureau, Ye Shufan, member of the town party committee, and relevant personnel such as Xintongsheng Industrial Development Co., Ltd., and New Century Basketball Club unveiled the new team logo.

The Vermilion Birds won their second WCBA title in 2025 against the Sichuan Yuanda, winning the series 3-1.

The Vermilion Birds won their first Women's Basketball League Asia title in 2025.

== Season-by-season records ==
Season	Corporate Sponsor	Home City	Final Rank	Record (including playoffs)			Head coach
Season	Corporate Sponsor	Home City	Final Rank	W	L	%	Head coach
Guangdong Kapok
2002	Dongguan Junda	Dongguan	3rd	10	4	71.4	(China) Zheng Wei
2002–03	Dongguan Junda	Dongguan	2nd	15	8	65.2	(China) Zheng Wei
2004	Foshan Hongjia Aluminum	Foshan	6th	5	5	50.0	(China) Zheng Wei
2004–05	Foshan Hongjia Aluminum	Foshan	6th	9	9	50.0	(China) Zheng Wei
2005–06	Foshan Hongjia Aluminum	Dongguan	10th	9	16	36.0	(China) Zheng Wei
2007	Sunray Cave	Dongguan	7th	4	8	33.3	(China) Zheng Wei
Guangdong Dolphins
2007–08	Asia Aluminum	Zhaoqing	6th	8	10	44.4	(China) Zheng Wei
2008–09	Asia Aluminum	Foshan	6th	12	12	50.0	(China) Zhao Li
2009–10	Asia Aluminum	Foshan	5th	14	10	58.3	(China) Chen Duan
2010–11	Asia Aluminum	Foshan	2nd	23	8	74.2	(China) Pan Wei
2011–12	Asia Aluminum	Foshan	7th	15	10	60.0	(China) Pan Wei
2012–13	Dongguan Daily News	Dongguan	8th	10	14	41.7	(United States) Bo Overton
2013–14	Dongguan Daily News	Dongguan	5th	14	10	58.3	(China) Ma Yongzhong
2014–15	Dongguan Songshan Lake	Dongguan	7th	13	17	43.3	(South Korea) Yoo Soo-jong
2015–16	Dongguan Marco Polo Group	Dongguan	4th	17	20	45.9	(Chinese Taipei) Wang Wei-chieh
2016–17	Dongguan Marco Polo Group	Dongguan	6th	18	19	48.6	(Chinese Taipei) Wang Wei-chieh
2017–18	Guangdong Xintongsheng	Dongguan; Shenzhen	4th	16	17	48.5	(China) Lin Yaosen
Guangdong Vermilion Birds
2018–19	Guangdong Xintongsheng	Dongguan					(China) Lin Yaosen

== Current players ==
2018–19 Guangdong Vermilion Birds roster
Players
Coaches

Pos.	No.	Nat.	Name	Ht.	Wt.
G	3	(China)	Yang Liwei	1.76 m (5 ft 9 in)	62 kg (137 lb)
PF	5	(China)	Wang Zhen	1.90 m (6 ft 3 in)	78 kg (172 lb)
G	6	(China)	Shen Yi	1.74 m (5 ft 9 in)	75 kg (165 lb)
SF	7	(China)	Zhang Dongxia	1.80 m (5 ft 11 in)	76 kg (168 lb)
SF	9	(China)	Liu Geting	1.83 m (6 ft 0 in)	70 kg (154 lb)
PF	11	(China)	Huang Sijing	1.92 m (6 ft 4 in)	83 kg (183 lb)
G	12	(China)	Yu Yue	1.78 m (5 ft 10 in)	62 kg (137 lb)
F	13	(China)	Chen Liyu	1.85 m (6 ft 1 in)	78 kg (172 lb)
C	15	(China)	Dilana Dilixiati	1.93 m (6 ft 4 in)	86 kg (190 lb)
C	16	(China)	Li Yueru	2.01 m (6 ft 7 in)	103 kg (227 lb)
G	20	(China)	Bi Huiyi	1.80 m (5 ft 11 in)	67 kg (148 lb)
SF	23	(United States)	Aerial Powers	1.85 m (6 ft 1 in)	70 kg (154 lb)
SG	30	(China)	Yang Shuyu	1.82 m (6 ft 0 in)	70 kg (154 lb)
PF	33	(United States)	Nneka Ogwumike	1.90 m (6 ft 3 in)	85 kg (187 lb)

Head coach

- (China) Lin Yaosen

Assistant coach(es)

- (Montenegro) Luka Sjekloća
- (China) Zhang Chongxi

Legend

- (C) Team captain
- Injured

== Notable former players ==
- (United States) Deanna Jackson (2002–05)
- (United States) Chasity Melvin (2008–09)
- (United States) Swin Cash (2009–12)
- (United States) Ashley Corral (2012)
- (United States) Tamika Catchings (2012–13)
- (Jamaica) Aneika Henry (2014–15)
- (Belarus) Yelena Leuchanka (2015–17)
- (United States) Candace Parker (2016)
- (United States) Glory Johnson (2017)
- (United States) Amber Harris (2017–18)
- (Japan) Yui Hanada (2009–10)
- (Chinese Taipei) Yang Ya-hui (2015–17)
- (China) Xu Chunmei (2002)
- (China) Pan Wei (2002–05)
- (China) Song Xiaoyun (2002–09)
- (China) Guan Xin (2004–13)
- (China) Wei Wei (2004–14)
- (China) Huang Hongpin (2007–14, 2017–18)
