= Beijing Great Wall =

- League: Women's Chinese Basketball Association
- Arena: Shougang Gymnasium
- Capacity: 6,000
- Location: Beijing
- Affiliation: Beijing Shougang Co., Ltd.
- Championships: 4 (2012, 2016, 2017, 2018)

Beijing Great Wall is a Chinese professional women's basketball club based in Beijing, playing in the Women's Chinese Basketball Association (WCBA). The team is owned by Beijing Shougang Co., Ltd., which also owns the Beijing Ducks men's basketball team. Beijing Great Wall sometimes also carries the name of its sponsor BBMG.

The team won 4 WCBA championships, first in 2012 and more recently from 2016 to 2018.

== History ==
The team was founded in 1952 and has won several championships during its history. In the national system, the Beijing team won several Chinese Women's Basketball League A and National Games championships. However, the team was also relegated to the second division because of its poor performance. In 1981, the Beijing women's basketball team won the last national league championship during the national system.

After four years of dormancy in the second division, the Beijing Shougang women's basketball team returned to the newly established top league WCBA in 1995. Although the Beijing women's basketball team has also introduced excellent players such as Zhang Yu and Qian Weijuan, the team has been wandering in the league until 2011. In May 2011, the team was even more dissatisfied with the "corporal punishment" of the coach, and the whole echelon of training broke out. However, the team rose rapidly in the subsequent 2011–2012 season, when the Beijing women's basketball team once again introduced Zhang Yu from Liaoning and former South Korean national player Kim Young-ok. Coupled with the gradual maturity of Zhang Fan, the core of the team, the Beijing women's basketball team finally successfully reached the season's finals and defeated Zhejiang to win the season's championship.

The Beijing Women's basket ball team has remained a regular competitor in the WCBA since then. In 2016, the team won its second WCBA championship. The team has also competed in the FIBA Asia Women's Championship and won the competition twice. Several players who have represented Beijing have also played for the Chinese women's national basketball team.

== Season-by-season records ==
Season	Final Rank	Record (including playoffs)			Head coach
Season	Final Rank	W	L	%	Head coach
2002	10th	8	6	57.1	Sun Ruiyun
2002–03	7th	8	10	44.4	Sun Ruiyun
2004	8th	3	7	40.0	Sun Ruiyun
2004–05	8th	7	11	38.9	Sun Ruiyun
2005–06	8th	9	15	37.5	Xu Limin
2007	8th	3	9	25.0	Xu Limin
2007–08	5th	12	6	66.7	Xu Limin
2008–09	3rd	17	9	65.4	Xu Limin
2009–10	6th	14	11	56.0	Xu Limin
2010–11	8th	9	15	37.5	Xu Limin
2011–12	Champion	24	7	77.4	Xu Limin
2012–13	4th	16	11	59.3	Xu Limin
2013–14	2nd	23	9	71.9	Xu Limin
2014–15	2nd	28	11	71.8	Xu Limin
2015–16	Champion	29	16	64.4	Xu Limin
2016–17	Champion	33	9	78.6	Xu Limin
2017–18	Champion	30	6	83.3	Zhang Yunsong
2018–19	4th	27	14	65.9	Zhang Yunsong

== Current players ==
2018–19 Beijing Great Wall roster
Players
Coaches

Pos.	No.	Nat.	Name	Ht.	Wt.
SG	4	(China)	Qi Site	1.81 m (5 ft 11 in)	68 kg (150 lb)
PG	5	(China)	Zhou Honghua	1.72 m (5 ft 8 in)	67 kg (148 lb)
C	6	(China)	Tang Yu	1.92 m (6 ft 4 in)	85 kg (187 lb)
F	7	(China)	Feng Fan	1.90 m (6 ft 3 in)	85 kg (187 lb)
PG	8	(China)	Yang Banban	1.71 m (5 ft 7 in)	65 kg (143 lb)
SF	9	(China)	Shao Ting	1.86 m (6 ft 1 in)	75 kg (165 lb)
F	10	(China)	Song Huiying	1.83 m (6 ft 0 in)	67 kg (148 lb)
SF	11	(China)	Shi Xiufeng	1.75 m (5 ft 9 in)	67 kg (148 lb)
C	12	(China)	Gao Song	1.90 m (6 ft 3 in)	80 kg (176 lb)
C	13	(China)	Liu Meitong	1.90 m (6 ft 3 in)	80 kg (176 lb)
C	14	(China)	Su Wenyan	2.02 m (6 ft 8 in)	80 kg (176 lb)
SG	15	(China)	Zheng Xianglin	1.76 m (5 ft 9 in)	60 kg (132 lb)
C	17	(China)	Xu Mingyang	1.90 m (6 ft 3 in)	70 kg (154 lb)
SF	18	(China)	Qi Yu	1.78 m (5 ft 10 in)	65 kg (143 lb)
SG	19	(China)	Ni Yuxia	1.83 m (6 ft 0 in)	70 kg (154 lb)
C	31	(United States)	Tina Charles	1.93 m (6 ft 4 in)	91 kg (201 lb)
PF	33	(United States)	Morgan Tuck	1.88 m (6 ft 2 in)	91 kg (201 lb)

Head coach

- (China) Zhang Yunsong

Assistant coach(es)

- (China) Ma Lihua
- (China) Zhang Fan

Legend

- (C) Team captain
- Injured

== Notable former players ==
- (United States) DeMya Walker (2002–03, 2004–05, 2009–10)
- (Nigeria) Taiwo Rafiu (2004)
- (United States) Betty Lennox (2005–06)
- (United States) Jennifer Lacy (2008–09)
- (United States) Vanessa Hayden (2009)
- (United States) Jacinta Monroe (2010–11)
- (United States) Nicky Anosike (2011–12)
- (Saint Vincent and the Grenadines) (United States) Sophia Young (2012–13)
- (Australia) Liz Cambage (2013–14)
- (United States) Brittney Griner (2014–15)
- (United States) Sylvia Fowles (2015–18)
- (United States) Imani McGee-Stafford (2017)
- (Chinese Taipei) Chien Wei-Chuan (2002, 2004–05)
- (South Korea) Kim Yeong-ok (2011–13)
- (China) Zhang Fan (2002–18)
- (China) Zhang Wei (2007–09)
- (China) Zhang Yu (2011–12)
