= Shandong Six Stars =

- League: Women's Chinese Basketball Association
- Arena: Penglai Stadium (since 2017)
- Location: Penglai, Shandong (since 2017)
- Affiliation: Xiwang Group

Shandong Six Stars (Chinese: 山东南斗六星) is a Chinese professional women's basketball club based in Shandong, playing in the Women's Chinese Basketball Association (WCBA).

In Chinese constellations, the asterism known as the "Six Stars of South Dipper" is located in Sagittarius.

== Season-by-season records ==
Season	Corporate Sponsor	Home City	Final Rank	Record (including playoffs)			Head coach
Season	Corporate Sponsor	Home City	Final Rank	W	L	%	Head coach
2002	Inzone Group	Yantai	9th	5	9	35.7	Ma Lianmin
2002–03		Yantai	12th	0	16	0	Yao Weiguo
2004	Did not qualify / participate						
2004–05	Did not qualify / participate						
2005–06	Shandong Plastics Industry	Dongying	11th	5	20	20.0	Ji Minshang
2007	Shandong Sports Lottery	Linyi	11th	4	9	30.8	Ji Minshang
2007–08	Shandong Sports Lottery	Linyi	12th	0	18	0	Ji Minshang
2008–09	Shandong Sports Lottery	Linyi	10th	7	15	31.8	Ji Minshang
2009–10	Shandong Sports Lottery	Dongying	12th	1	21	4.6	Liu Zhen
2010–11	Did not qualify / participate						
2011–12	Shandong Sports Lottery	Gaomi	11th	3	19	13.6	Liu Zhen
2012–13	Did not qualify / participate						
2013–14		Dezhou	12th	1	21	4.6	Jiang Jilin
2014–15	Did not qualify / participate						
2015–16	Shandong Sports Lottery	Jinan	11th	6	26	18.8	Yu Ying
2016–17	Shandong Sports Lottery	Shouguang	12th	4	28	12.5	Li Guangqi
2017–18	Shandong Hi-Speed Group	Penglai	12th	8	18	30.8	Li Guangqi
2018–19	Xiwang Group	Penglai	6th	24	14	63.2	Li Guangqi

== Notable former players ==
- (United States) Coco Miller (2005–06)
- (United States) Chante Black (2011–12)
- (United States) Ashley Paris (2015–16)
- (United States) Lynetta Kizer (2017–18)
- (China) Miao Bo (2002–03)
- (China) Yang Hengyu (2018–19)
- (China) Li Yuan (2018–19)
- (China) Wang Siyu (2018–19)
- (United States) DeWanna Bonner (2018–19)
- (United States) Cheyenne Parker-Tyus (2025-present)

== See also ==
- Zhang Ziyu
