= Shanxi Flame =

Shanxi Xing Rui Flame
- League: Women's Chinese Basketball Association
- Founded: 2011; 15 years ago
- Arena: Shanxi Sports Centre Stadium
- Capacity: 8,000
- Location: Taiyuan, Shanxi
- Main sponsor: Zhuyeqing Liquor
- President: Wang Haizhen
- Ownership: Xing Rui Group
- Championships: 3 (2013, 2014, 2015)

Shanxi Xing Rui Flame is a professional women's basketball club located in Taiyuan, Shanxi, China, playing in the Women's Chinese Basketball Association (WCBA). It is also known by its sponsor's name Zhuyeqing. Led by WNBA star Maya Moore, the club won 3 consecutive WCBA championships from 2013 to 2015.

== Season-by-season records ==
Season	Final Rank	Record (including playoffs)			Head coach
Season	Final Rank	W	L	%	Head coach
2012–13	Champion	22	9	71.0	(Spain) Lucas Mondelo
2013–14	Champion	26	5	83.9	(Spain) Lucas Mondelo
2014–15	Champion	30	9	76.9	(Spain) Lucas Mondelo
2015–16	7th	16	21	43.2	(Spain) Lucas Mondelo
2016–17	8th	15	21	41.7	(Italy) Mauro Procaccini; (Australia) Tom Maher; (China) Chen Weidong
2017–18	2nd	25	10	71.4	(South Korea) Park Myung-soo
2018–19	8th	18	19	48.6	(Greece) George Dikeoulakos

== Current roster ==
2018–19 Shanxi Flame roster
Players
Coaches

Pos.	No.	Nat.	Name	Ht.	Wt.
SG	3	(China)	Peng Ying	1.75 m (5 ft 9 in)	68 kg (150 lb)
PG	4	(China)	Zhao Zhifang	1.68 m (5 ft 6 in)	60 kg (132 lb)
PG	5	(Chinese Taipei)	Huang Fan-shan	1.75 m (5 ft 9 in)	67 kg (148 lb)
SF	7	(China)	Wu Di	1.83 m (6 ft 0 in)	80 kg (176 lb)
PF	9	(China)	Yu Dong	1.94 m (6 ft 4 in)	90 kg (198 lb)
PG	10	(China)	Wu Tongtong	1.75 m (5 ft 9 in)	75 kg (165 lb)
SF	11	(China)	Guo Zixuan	1.86 m (6 ft 1 in)	71 kg (157 lb)
F	12	(China)	Lin Jiahui	1.88 m (6 ft 2 in)	74 kg (163 lb)
C	15	(China)	Zhang Tianyu	1.93 m (6 ft 4 in)	83 kg (183 lb)
C	16	(China)	Wei Wei	2.06 m (6 ft 9 in)	101 kg (223 lb)
F	17	(China)	Yu Qi	1.80 m (5 ft 11 in)	80 kg (176 lb)
PG	19	(China)	Chai Xiufang	1.72 m (5 ft 8 in)	62 kg (137 lb)
F	21	(China)	Wang Qixuan	1.87 m (6 ft 2 in)	69 kg (152 lb)
SF	23	(China)	Yu Xinxin	1.83 m (6 ft 0 in)	69 kg (152 lb)

Head coach

- (Greece) George Dikeoulakos

Assistant coach(es)

- (United States) Gary Gaspard
- (Greece) Petros Prekas

Legend

- (C) Team captain
- Injured

== Notable former players ==
China

- Zhang Wei
- Ma Xueya
- Zhang Yu
- Guan Xin
- Ji Yanyan
- Huang Hongpin

Australia

- Liz Cambage
- Penny Taylor

Bahamas

- Jonquel Jones

Japan

- Yuko Oga

South Korea

- Jung Sun-min

United States

- Diamond DeShields
- Ebony Hoffman
- Jewell Loyd
- Maya Moore
- Courtney Paris
- Quanitra Hollingsworth (Turkey)
- Tamera Young
