= Dalang Arena =

Sports venue in Dalang, Dongguan, China

Coordinates: 22.93342°N 113.93180°E

- Interactive map of Dalang Arena
- Full name: Dalang Arena
- Location: Dalang, Dongguan, Guangdong, China
- Capacity: 4,000

Construction
- Opened: 1994

Tenant
- Shenzhen Leopards (CBA)

Dalang Arena (Chinese: 大朗体育馆; pinyin: Dàlǎng Tǐyùguǎn) is an indoor sporting arena located in Dalang, Dongguan, Guangdong, China. The capacity of the arena is 4,000 spectators and opened in 1994. It hosts indoor sporting events such as basketball and volleyball and is home to the Shenzhen Leopards who play in the Chinese Basketball Association.

== See also ==
- Dongguan Arena
