= Women's Chinese Basketball Association =

First-tier professional women's basketball league in China

Women's Chinese Basketball Association (WCBA)
- Organising body: Chinese Basketball Management Center
- Founded: 2002; 24 years ago
- Country: China
- Federation: Chinese Basketball Association
- Confederation: FIBA Asia (Asia)
- Divisions: 3
- Number of teams: 21
- Level on pyramid: 1
- International cup: Women's Basketball League Asia
- Current champions: Sichuan Yuanda (3rd title) (2025–26)
- Most championships: Bayi Kylin (5 titles)
- Website: Official website
- 2025–26 WCBA season

The Women's Chinese Basketball Association (simplified Chinese: 中国女子篮球联赛; traditional Chinese: 中國女子籃球聯賽; pinyin: Zhōngguó nǚzǐ lánqiú liánsài), often abbreviated as the WCBA, is the first-tier professional women's basketball league in China. It was established in 2002 as the women's counterpart to the Chinese Basketball Association (CBA).

== Current clubs ==
There are currently 21 teams in the league. Team names often incorporate the names of their corporate sponsors.

=== Current teams ===
Club		Home City	Arena
Club name	Name in Chinese	Home City	Arena
Group A1 (6 teams)
Fujian Xiangwang Public Exhibition	福建香汪众展	Jinjiang, Fujian	No. 1, Jinjiang No. 2 Sports Centre
Jiangfen Yutai Mountain	江芬玉台山	Liyang, Jiangsu	Liyang City Gymnasium
Shandong Six Stars	山东山高	Yantai, Shandong	Penglai Gymnasium
Sichuan Yuanda	四川远达美乐	Chengdu, Sichuan	Jinqiang International Event Center
Xinjiang Tianshan	新疆天山	Ürümqi, Xinjiang	Xinjiang Sports Centre
Zhejiang Chouzhou Bank	浙江稠州银行	Jinhua, Zhejiang	Yiwu Meihu Sports Centre
Group A2 (6 teams)
Beijing Shougang	北京首钢	Beijing	Shougang Basketball Center
Guangdong Vermilion Birds	东莞新世纪	Dongguan, Guangdong	Dalang Arena
Hebei Yingkai	河北英开	Hengshui, Hebei	Hengshui City Gymnasium
Inner Mongolia Rural Credit Union	内蒙古农信	Hohhot, Inner Mongolia	Inner Mongolia Gymnasium
Shanghai Kaiyuan	上海开元	Shanghai	Baochan Sports Center
Shanxi Xingrui	山西兴瑞	Taiyuan, Shanxi	Shanxi Sports Centre Gymnasium
Group B (9 teams)
Heilongjiang Shandong	黑龙江上东	Daqing, Heilongjiang	Daqing Oil Field Gymnasium
Hefei Cultural Tourism	合肥文旅	Hefei, Anhui	Hefei Sports Centre Gymnasium
Jiyuan Wangwu Mountain	济源王屋山	Jiyuan, Henan	
Jiangxi Xiuxing	江西修星	Ganzhou, Jiangxi	
Liaoning Dalian Sports Products	辽宁大连体产	Anshan, Liaoning	Angang Gymnasium
Shaanxi Tianze	陕西天泽	Xi'an, Shaanxi	Siyuan Student Activity Centre Gymnasium of Xi'an Jiaotong University
Tianjin Guanlan	天津冠岚	Tianjin	Gegu Gymnasium
Wuhan Shengfan	武汉盛帆	Wuhan, Hubei	Jiangxia Gymnasium
Xiamen Sports Group	厦门体育集团	Xiamen, Fujian	

== List of WCBA champions ==
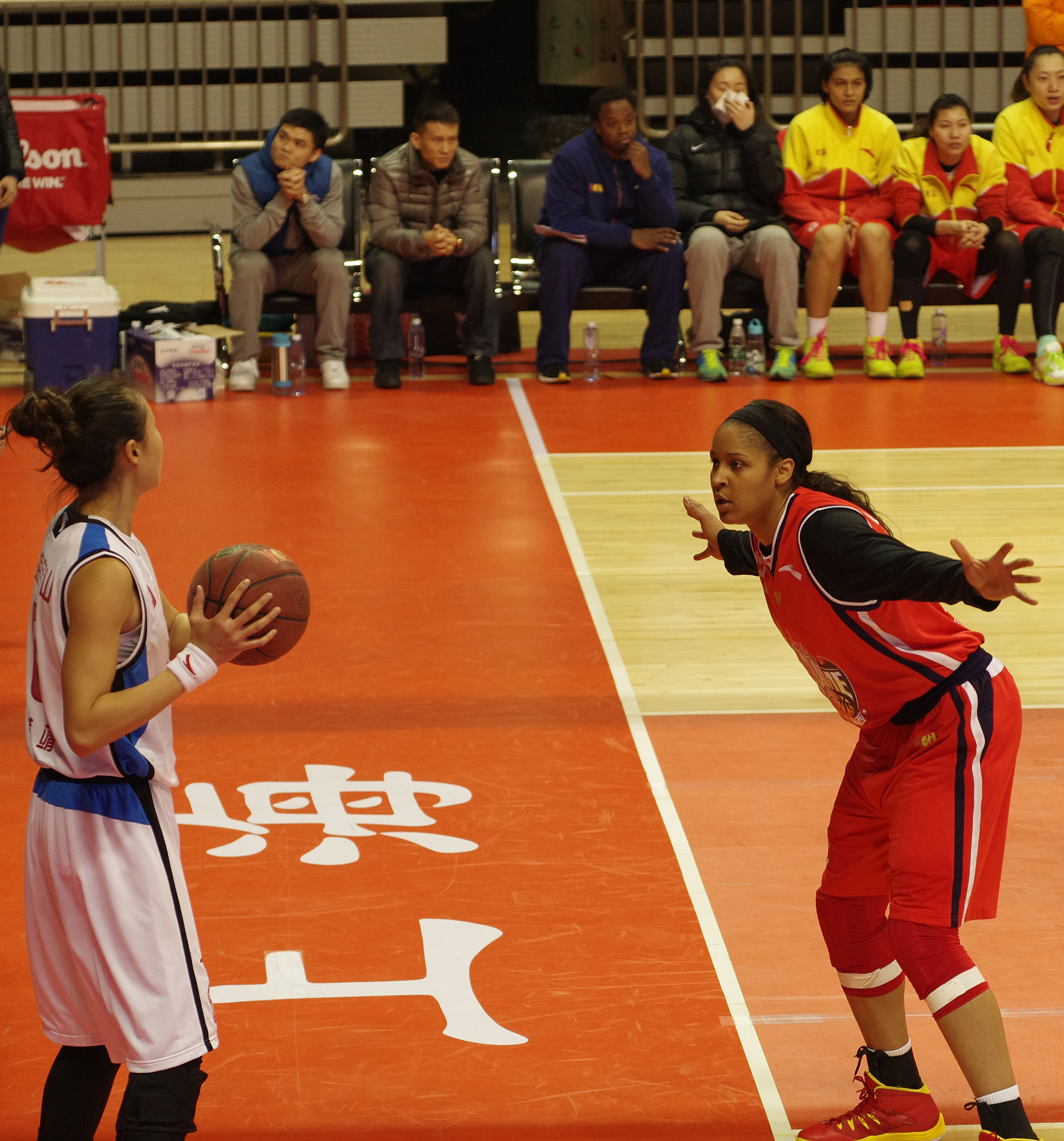
Shanxi Flame's Maya Moore defending an inbound pass from Shanghai Octopus's Huang Jing during a January 2014 WCBA game in Shanghai.

- 2002 - Bayi Kylin
- 2003 - Bayi Kylin
- 2004 - Bayi Kylin
- 2005 - Bayi Kylin
- 2006 - Liaoning Golden Leopards
- 2007 - Liaoning Golden Leopards
- 2008 - Bayi Kylin
- 2009 - Liaoning Golden Leopards
- 2010 - Liaoning Golden Leopards
- 2011 - Shenyang Army Golden Lions
- 2012 - Beijing Great Wall
- 2013 - Shanxi Flame
- 2014 - Shanxi Flame
- 2015 - Shanxi Flame
- 2016 - Beijing Great Wall
- 2017 - Beijing Great Wall
- 2018 - Beijing Great Wall
- 2019 - Guangdong Vermilion Birds
- 2020 - Season canceled due to COVID-19
- 2021 - Inner Mongolia Rural Credit Union
- 2022 - Inner Mongolia Rural Credit Union
- 2023 - Sichuan Yuanda
- 2024 - Sichuan Yuanda
- 2025 - Guangdong Vermilion Birds
- 2026 - Sichuan Yuanda

== List of WCBA Club Cup champions ==
- 2026 - Shanxi Flame

== Players with the most championships ==
1. 7 × champions: Zhang Yu (from 3 teams)
2. 6 × champions: Yang Banban (from 2 teams)
3. 5 × champions: Zhang Wei (from 2 teams), Sui Feifei, Chen Nan, Ren Lei, Zhang Xiaoni, Chen Lisha

== WNBA All-Stars in WCBA history ==
- (United States) Nicky Anosike
- (United States) Kelsey Bone
- (United States) DeWanna Bonner
- (United States) Kara Braxton
- (United States) Jessica Breland
- (Australia) Liz Cambage
- (United States) Swin Cash
- (United States) Tamika Catchings
- (United States) Tina Charles
- (United States) Stefanie Dolson
- (United States) Candice Dupree
- (United States) Sylvia Fowles
- (United States) Yolanda Griffith
- (United States) Brittney Griner
- (Australia) Lauren Jackson
- (United States) Glory Johnson
- (United States) Asjha Jones
- (The Bahamas) Jonquel Jones
- (United States) Crystal Langhorne
- (United States) Betty Lennox
- (United States) Jewell Loyd
- (United States) Chasity Melvin
- (United States) Kelsey Mitchell
- (United States) Maya Moore
- (United States) Chiney Ogwumike
- (United States) Nneka Ogwumike
- (United States) Candace Parker
- (United States) Ruth Riley
- (United States) Tangela Smith
- (United States) Breanna Stewart
- (Australia) Penny Taylor
- (United States) DeMya Walker
- (United States) Adrian Williams-Strong
- (United States) Elizabeth Williams
- (United States) A'ja Wilson
- (Saint Vincent and the Grenadines) (United States) Sophia Young

== See also ==
- Women's sports
- Sport in China
- China women's national basketball team
- Chinese Basketball Association (CBA)
- National Basketball League (NBL)
- Chinese University Basketball Association (CUBA)
