= Xinjiang Magic Deer =

Xinjiang Tian Shan Magic Deer
- League: Women's Chinese Basketball Association
- Founded: 2015; 11 years ago
- Arena: 1. Xinjiang Sports Centre; 2. Changji Stadium
- Location: 1. Ürümqi, Xinjiang; 2. Changji, Xinjiang
- Main sponsor: Xinjiang Sports Lottery (since 2017)

Xinjiang Tian Shan Magic Deer is a Chinese professional women's basketball club based in Ürümqi, Xinjiang, playing in the Women's Chinese Basketball Association (WCBA). The team also plays some home games in Changji.

The nickname Tian Shan magic deer is derived from Tian Shan wapiti, an elk subspecies native to Tian Shan in Xinjiang.

== Season-by-season records ==
Season	Corporate Sponsor	Home City	Final Rank	Record (including playoffs)			Head coach
Season	Corporate Sponsor	Home City	Final Rank	W	L	%	Head coach
2015–16	Wo Jiang Modern Agriculture	Ürümqi	2nd	31	10	75.6	Zhan Shuping
2016–17	Wo Jiang Modern Agriculture	Ürümqi	3rd	22	15	59.5	Zhan Shuping
2017–18	Xinjiang Sports Lottery	Ürümqi	5th	21	9	70.0	Zhan Shuping
2018–19	Xinjiang Sports Lottery	Ürümqi; Changji	5th	29	9	76.3	Wang Guizhi; Xiong Yan

== Current players ==
2018–19 Xinjiang Magic Deer roster
Players
Coaches

Pos.	No.	Nat.	Name	Ht.	Wt.
C	0	(The Bahamas)	Waltiea Rolle	1.98 m (6 ft 6 in)	90 kg (198 lb)
PF	1	(United States)	Glory Johnson	1.91 m (6 ft 3 in)	78 kg (172 lb)
C	3	(United States)	Natasha Howard	1.90 m (6 ft 3 in)	80 kg (176 lb)
SF	5	(China)	Wu Yifan	1.75 m (5 ft 9 in)	63 kg (139 lb)
SG	8	(China)	Hu Ke	1.85 m (6 ft 1 in)	80 kg (176 lb)
SG	9	(Chinese Taipei)	Peng Szu-chin	1.63 m (5 ft 4 in)	58 kg (128 lb)
C	11	(China)	Han Xu	2.07 m (6 ft 9 in)	85 kg (187 lb)
F	12	(China)	Wang Rong	1.83 m (6 ft 0 in)	69 kg (152 lb)
C	15	(China)	Liu Tongyi	1.92 m (6 ft 4 in)	83 kg (183 lb)
C	16	(China)	Chen Mingling	1.92 m (6 ft 4 in)	85 kg (187 lb)
SF	17	(China)	Yu Lu	1.85 m (6 ft 1 in)	70 kg (154 lb)
SF	19	(China)	Liu Xiao	1.82 m (6 ft 0 in)	70 kg (154 lb)
C	21	(China)	Jiang Tong	1.90 m (6 ft 3 in)	80 kg (176 lb)
SF	23	(China)	Wang Lili	1.75 m (5 ft 9 in)	74 kg (163 lb)
G	57	(China)	Li Yuqiong	1.73 m (5 ft 8 in)	60 kg (132 lb)

Head coach

- (China) Xiong Yan

Assistant coach(es)

- (China) Gao Fengjuan
- (China) Sun Yongqian

Legend

- (C) Team captain
- Injured

== Notable former players ==
- (United States) Kalani Brown
- (United States) Tina Charles (2015–16)
- (United States) Camille Little (2016)
- (United States) Candace Parker (2017–18)
- (China) Ma Zengyu (2015–16)
- (China) Zhang Xiaoni (2015–16, 2017–18)
- (China) Ma Xueya (2016–17)
