= 2023 FIBA Women's Asia Cup squads =

This article displays the rosters for the teams competing at the 2023 FIBA Women's Asia Cup. Each team had to submit 12 players.

== Group A ==
=== China ===
China women's national basketball team roster
Players
Coaches

Pos.	No.	Name	Age – Date of birth	Height	Club	Ctr.
G	4	Li Yuan	23 – 29 May 2000	1.70 m (5 ft 7 in)	Shandong Six Stars	(China)
G	5	Wang Siyu	27 – 16 October 1995	1.80 m (5 ft 11 in)	Shandong Six Stars	(China)
F	6	Yang Shuyu	21 – 6 March 2002	1.80 m (5 ft 11 in)	Guangdong Vermilion Birds	(China)
PG	7	Yang Liwei (C)	28 – 2 January 1995	1.76 m (5 ft 9 in)	Guangdong Vermilion Birds	(China)
G	8	Jin Weina	31 – 27 April 1992	1.80 m (5 ft 11 in)	Jiangsu Phoenix	(China)
SG	9	Li Meng	28 – 2 January 1995	1.83 m (6 ft 0 in)	Liaoning Flying Eagles	(China)
F	10	Zhang Ru	23 – 2 September 1999	1.85 m (6 ft 1 in)	Henan Phoenix	(China)
F	11	Luo Xinyu	21 – 22 November 2001	1.88 m (6 ft 2 in)	Jiangsu Phoenix	(China)
F	12	Pan Zhenqi	27 – 5 July 1995	1.90 m (6 ft 3 in)	Beijing Great Wall	(China)
PF	13	Gao Song	31 – 16 April 1992	1.90 m (6 ft 3 in)	Beijing Great Wall	(China)
C	14	Tang Yu	24 – 10 March 1999	1.88 m (6 ft 2 in)		(China)
C	15	Han Xu	23 – 31 October 1999	2.05 m (6 ft 9 in)	Xinjiang Magic Deer	(China)

Head coach

- (China) Zheng Wei

Assistant coach(es)

- (South Korea) Park Myung-soo
- (Spain) César Rupérez

Legend

- (C) Team captain
- Club – describes last
  club before the tournament
- Age – describes age
  on 26 June 2023

=== Lebanon ===
Lebanon roster for the 2023 FIBA Women's Asia Cup.

2023 Lebanon women's national basketball team roster
Players
Coaches

Pos.	No.	Name	Age – Date of birth	Height	Club	Ctr.
C	1	Zena Elias	23 – 5 February 2000	1.91 m (6 ft 3 in)	South Alabama Jaguars	(United States)
C	6	Chirine El Charif	38 – 6 October 1984	1.83 m (6 ft 0 in)	Al Riyadi	(Lebanon)
C	7	Narine Gyokchian	29 – 22 July 1993	1.87 m (6 ft 2 in)	BC Hatis	(Armenia)
PF	8	Daniella Fayad	25 – 4 September 1997	1.80 m (5 ft 11 in)	Al Riyadi	(Lebanon)
SF	9	Layla Fares	34 – 12 March 1989	1.75 m (5 ft 9 in)	Beirut Club	(Lebanon)
PG	10	Rana El-Husseini	22 – 17 April 2001	1.57 m (5 ft 2 in)	Buffalo Bulls	(United States)
PG	11	Rebecca Akl (C)	30 – 18 October 1992	1.70 m (5 ft 7 in)	Beirut Club	(Lebanon)
PG	13	Miramar Mokdad	35 – 24 December 1987	1.70 m (5 ft 7 in)	Beirut Club	(Lebanon)
SF	14	Trinity Baptiste	25 – 15 June 1998	1.83 m (6 ft 0 in)	Plateros de Fresnillo	(Mexico)
SG	23	Nathalie Sevaijan	35 – 2 February 1988	1.70 m (5 ft 7 in)	Beirut Club	(Lebanon)
G	24	Amar Mansour	18 – 7 November 2004	1.79 m (5 ft 10 in)	Hoops Club	(Lebanon)
PF	33	Aida Bakhos	37 – 21 March 1986	1.77 m (5 ft 10 in)	Al-Ahli	(Saudi Arabia)

Head coach

- (Lebanon) Georges El Dabbak Geagea

Assistant coach(es)

- (Lebanon) Ziad Al Natour
- (Lebanon) Gilbert Nasr

Legend

- (C) Team captain
- Club – describes last
  club before the tournament
- Age – describes age
  on 26 June 2023

=== New Zealand ===
An 18-player roster was announced on 11 May. The final squad was revealed on 16 June.

New Zealand women's national basketball team roster
Players
Coaches

Pos.	No.	Name	Age – Date of birth	Height	Club	Ctr.
F	3	Esra McGoldrick	23 – 24 October 1999	1.87 m (6 ft 2 in)	Mainland Pouākai	(New Zealand)
PG	4	Krystal Leger-Walker	25 – 29 September 1997	1.75 m (5 ft 9 in)	Northern Kāhu	(New Zealand)
SG	5	Charlisse Leger-Walker	21 – 15 September 2001	1.78 m (5 ft 10 in)	Washington State Cougars	(United States)
PF	6	Parris Mason	20 – 13 December 2002	1.82 m (6 ft 0 in)	Tokomanawa Queens	(New Zealand)
PG	7	Stella Beck (C)	27 – 25 September 1995	1.81 m (5 ft 11 in)	Tokomanawa Queens	(New Zealand)
PG	8	Tahlia Tupaea	26 – 1 June 1997	1.74 m (5 ft 9 in)	Northern Kāhu	(New Zealand)
C	12	Penina Davidson	27 – 2 September 1995	1.91 m (6 ft 3 in)	Cairns Dolphins	(Australia)
C	13	Josephine Stockill	29 – 29 December 1993	1.85 m (6 ft 1 in)	Tokomanawa Queens	(New Zealand)
C	15	Ritorya Tamilo	18 – 15 June 2005	1.92 m (6 ft 4 in)	Baradene College	(New Zealand)
SF	24	Tera Reed	24 – 24 September 1998	1.82 m (6 ft 0 in)	Northern Kāhu	(New Zealand)
G	26	Tayla Dalton	21 – 1 October 2001	1.74 m (5 ft 9 in)	Saint Mary's Gaels	(United States)
SG	44	Grace Hunter	22 – 4 July 2000	1.75 m (5 ft 9 in)	Tokomanawa Queens	(New Zealand)

Head coach

- (Australia) Guy Molloy

Assistant coach(es)

- (New Zealand) Jody Tini
- (New Zealand) Leanne Walker

Legend

- (C) Team captain
- Club – describes last
  club before the tournament
- Age – describes age
  on 26 June 2023

=== South Korea ===
The roster was announced on 28 April.

South Korea women's national basketball team roster
Players
Coaches

Pos.	No.	Name	Age – Date of birth	Height	Club	Ctr.
PG	1	Shin Ji-hyun	27 – 12 September 1995	1.73 m (5 ft 8 in)	Bucheon Hana 1Q	(South Korea)
F	3	Kang Lee-seul	29 – 5 April 1994	1.80 m (5 ft 11 in)	Cheongju KB Stars	(South Korea)
PG	5	An He-ji	26 – 12 February 1997	1.64 m (5 ft 5 in)	Busan BNK Sum	(South Korea)
G	6	Lee So-hee	22 – 7 August 2000	1.71 m (5 ft 7 in)	Busan BNK Sum	(South Korea)
C	7	Park Ji-su	24 – 6 December 1998	1.98 m (6 ft 6 in)	Cheongju KB Stars	(South Korea)
G	9	Lee Kyung-eun	35 – 13 July 1987	1.76 m (5 ft 9 in)	Incheon S-Birds	(South Korea)
G	11	Park Ji-hyun	23 – 7 April 2000	1.85 m (6 ft 1 in)	Woori Bank	(South Korea)
F	12	Lee Hae-ran	20 – 29 May 2003	1.80 m (5 ft 11 in)	Samsung Life Blueminx	(South Korea)
C	13	Yang In-young	28 – 13 March 1995	1.84 m (6 ft 0 in)	Bucheon Hana 1Q	(South Korea)
F	21	Kim Jin-young	26 – 20 July 1996	1.76 m (5 ft 9 in)	Incheon S-Birds	(South Korea)
F	23	Kim Dan-bi (C)	33 – 27 February 1990	1.80 m (5 ft 11 in)	Incheon S-Birds	(South Korea)
C	77	Jin An	27 – 23 March 1996	1.82 m (6 ft 0 in)	Busan BNK Sum	(South Korea)

Head coach

- (South Korea) Jung Sun-min

Assistant coach(es)

- (South Korea) Choi Youn-ah

Legend

- (C) Team captain
- Club – describes last
  club before the tournament
- Age – describes age
  on 26 June 2023

== Group B ==
=== Australia ===
A 19-player roster was announced on 23 May. The final squad was revealed on 20 June.

Australia women's national basketball team roster
Players
Coaches

Pos.	No.	Name	Age – Date of birth	Height	Club	Ctr.
F	1	Lauren Nicholson	30 – 26 March 1993	1.82 m (6 ft 0 in)	Townsville Fire	(Australia)
G	4	Shyla Heal	21 – 19 September 2001	1.67 m (5 ft 6 in)	Townsville Fire	(Australia)
PF	5	Darcee Garbin	28 – 24 June 1994	1.88 m (6 ft 2 in)	Diósgyőri VTK	(Hungary)
G	7	Tess Madgen (C)	32 – 12 August 1990	1.80 m (5 ft 11 in)	Melbourne Boomers	(Australia)
G	8	Maddison Rocci	25 – 1 June 1998	1.67 m (5 ft 6 in)	Southside Flyers	(Australia)
F	10	Alice Kunek	32 – 6 January 1991	1.87 m (6 ft 2 in)	Sopron Basket	(Hungary)
PF	17	Chantel Horvat	25 – 1 June 1998	1.84 m (6 ft 0 in)	AZS Gorzów	(Poland)
PF	21	Keely Froling	27 – 31 January 1996	1.87 m (6 ft 2 in)	Sydney Flames	(Australia)
SF	24	Anneli Maley	24 – 1 September 1998	1.84 m (6 ft 0 in)	Bendigo Spirit	(Australia)
SF	25	Amy Atwell	24 – 30 June 1998	1.83 m (6 ft 0 in)	Perth Lynx	(Australia)
PF	55	Chloe Bibby	25 – 15 June 1998	1.84 m (6 ft 0 in)	Perth Lynx	(Australia)
PF	77	Lauren Scherf	27 – 7 March 1996	1.95 m (6 ft 5 in)	La Molisana Magnolia	(Italy)

Head coach

- (Australia) Shannon Seebohm

Assistant coach(es)

- (Australia) Cheryl Chambers
- (Australia) Kristi Harrower

Legend

- (C) Team captain
- Club – describes last
  club before the tournament
- Age – describes age
  on 26 June 2023

=== Chinese Taipei ===
An 18-player roster was announced on 20 May 2023.

Chinese Taipei women's national basketball team roster
Players
Coaches

Pos.	No.	Name	Age – Date of birth	Height	Club	Ctr.
G	1	Liu Hsin-yu	24 – 23 November 1998	1.80 m (5 ft 11 in)	Cathay Life	(Taiwan)
PG	2	Pan Tzu-yin	30 – 23 July 1992	1.69 m (5 ft 7 in)
F	4	Chen Y3n-yu	28 – 7 October 1994	1.69 m (5 ft 7 in)
C	5	Chen Meng-sin	23 – 7 October 1999	1.64 m (5 ft 5 in)
G	6	Chen Wei-an	27 – 1 November 1995	1.76 m (5 ft 9 in)	Cathay Life	(Taiwan)
C	7	Wu Yu-hsuan	25 – 9 October 1997	1.83 m (6 ft 0 in)
F	10	Han Ya-en	28 – 1 January 1995	1.80 m (5 ft 11 in)	Cathay Life	(Taiwan)
C	11	Cheng I-hsiu	30 – 24 June 1993	1.78 m (5 ft 10 in)	Cathay Life	(Taiwan)
G	12	Lin Yu-ting	29 – 25 January 1994	1.78 m (5 ft 10 in)	Cathay Life	(Taiwan)
F	17	Huang Ling-chuan	28 – 6 December 1994	1.80 m (5 ft 11 in)	Cathay Life	(Taiwan)
SG	24	Liu Hsi-yeh (C)	31 – 10 October 1991	1.75 m (5 ft 9 in)
G	31	Chang Chi-fang	30 – 16 January 1993	1.73 m (5 ft 8 in)

Head coach

- (Taiwan) Cheng Hui-yun

Assistant coach(es)

- (Taiwan) Lin Chi-wen

Legend

- (C) Team captain
- Club – describes last
  club before the tournament
- Age – describes age
  on 26 June 2023

=== Japan ===
A 21-player roster was announced on 11 May. The final squad was revealed on 9 June.

Japan women's national basketball team roster
Players
Coaches

Pos.	No.	Name	Age – Date of birth	Height	Club	Ctr.
PF	3	Stephanie Mawuli	24 – 25 November 1998	1.82 m (6 ft 0 in)	Toyota Antelopes	(Japan)
PF	8	Maki Takada	33 – 23 August 1989	1.85 m (6 ft 1 in)	Denso Iris	(Japan)
C	12	Azusa Asahina	19 – 20 October 2003	1.85 m (6 ft 1 in)	University of Tsukuba	(Japan)
PG	15	Nako Motohashi	29 – 10 October 1993	1.64 m (5 ft 5 in)	Tokyo Haneda Vickies	(Japan)
PG	23	Mai Yamamoto	23 – 23 October 1999	1.63 m (5 ft 4 in)	Toyota Antelopes	(Japan)
SG	27	Saki Hayashi (C)	28 – 16 March 1995	1.73 m (5 ft 8 in)	Eneos Sunflowers	(Japan)
SG	31	Aika Hirashita	21 – 14 January 2002	1.77 m (5 ft 10 in)	Toyota Antelopes	(Japan)
PG	32	Saori Miyazaki	27 – 27 August 1995	1.67 m (5 ft 6 in)	Eneos Sunflowers	(Japan)
SG	59	Anri Hoshi	23 – 9 May 2000	1.70 m (5 ft 7 in)	Eneos Sunflowers	(Japan)
SF	75	Nanako Todo	22 – 29 November 2000	1.75 m (5 ft 9 in)	Toyota Boshoku Sunshine Rabbits	(Japan)
SF	88	Himawari Akaho	24 – 28 August 1998	1.84 m (6 ft 0 in)	Denso Iris	(Japan)
PF	99	Monica Okoye	24 – 7 February 1999	1.82 m (6 ft 0 in)	Geelong Supercats	(Australia)

Head coach

- (Japan) Toru Onzuka

Assistant coach(es)

- (Japan) Kakeru Konno
- (Japan) Yoshikazu Suzuki

Legend

- (C) Team captain
- Club – describes last
  club before the tournament
- Age – describes age
  on 26 June 2023

=== Philippines ===
The roster was announced on 21 June.

Philippines women's national basketball team roster
Players
Coaches

Pos.	No.	Name	Age – Date of birth	Height	Club	Ctr.
SG	0	Khate Castillo	26 – 5 October 1996	1.62 m (5 ft 4 in)	De La Salle Green Archers	(Philippines)
PG	2	Vanessa de Jesus	21 – 17 January 2002	1.73 m (5 ft 8 in)	Duke Blue Devils	(United States)
F	3	Afril Bernardino	27 – 3 April 1996	1.72 m (5 ft 8 in)	NU Bulldogs	(Philippines)
PG	5	Ella Fajardo	20 – 15 March 2003	1.65 m (5 ft 5 in)	NU Bulldogs	(Philippines)
G	6	France Cabinbin	29 – 6 December 1991	1.57 m (5 ft 2 in)	Lyceum	(Philippines)
SG	7	Janine Pontejos (C)	30 – 29 October 1992	1.65 m (5 ft 5 in)	Centro Escolar University	(Philippines)
SG	8	Angelica Surada	22 – 5 May 2001	1.75 m (5 ft 9 in)	NU Bulldogs	(Philippines)
SG	9	Louna Ozar	19 – 9 May 2004	1.72 m (5 ft 8 in)	Fil-Am Nation	(United States)
C	10	Jack Animam	24 – 27 November 1998	1.95 m (6 ft 5 in)	SPD Radnički	(Serbia)
G	15	Jhazmin Joson	23 – 15 August 1999	1.70 m (5 ft 7 in)
SF	19	Mikka Cacho	25 – 19 January 1998	1.75 m (5 ft 9 in)
SG	21	Camille Clarin	22 – 28 May 2001	1.78 m (5 ft 10 in)	NU Bulldogs	(Philippines)

Head coach

- (Philippines) Patrick Aquino

Assistant coach(es)

- (Philippines) Julie Amos
- (Philippines) Jose Garcoa

Legend

- (C) Team captain
- Club – describes last
  club before the tournament
- Age describes age
  on 26 June 2023
