= 2023 FIBA Women's Asia Cup =

International women's basketball tournament

Tournament details
- Host country: Australia
- City: Sydney
- Dates: 26 June – 2 July
- Teams: 16 (from 1 confederation)
- Venue: 1

Final positions
- Champions: China (12th title)
- Runners-up: Japan
- Third place: Australia
- Fourth place: New Zealand

Tournament statistics
- Games played: 20
- MVP: (China) Han Xu
- Top scorer: (China) Han Xu (22.0 ppg)

Official website
- FIBA Women's Asia Cup 2023 Division A FIBA Women's Asia Cup 2023 Division B

The 2023 FIBA Women's Asia Cup was the 30th edition of the tournament, held from 26 June to 2 July 2023 in Sydney, Australia. This was the first time Australia hosted the tournament. The top four teams qualified for the 2024 FIBA Women's Olympic Qualifying Tournaments.

China won their 12th title after a win in the final over Japan.

The FIBA Women's Asia Cup 2023 Division B was held later from 13 to 19 August 2023 in Bangkok, Thailand.

== Venue ==
Sydney	2023 FIBA Women's Asia Cup is located in Australia
State Sports Centre	2023 FIBA Women's Asia Cup is located in Australia
Capacity: 5,006	2023 FIBA Women's Asia Cup is located in Australia

== Format ==
The eight teams were split into two groups of four teams. The first-placed team qualified to the semifinals while the second-and third-placed teams played in a playoff round. The second-placed teams faced off against the third-placed teams. A knockout-system was used after the preliminary round with the losing teams playing in a classification game.

== Qualified teams ==
Seven teams from the last edition qualified for this year's tournament and the winners of the Division B tournament, Lebanon.

For Division A:

- The host nation
  - Australia
- Rest of the top seven places at the 2021 FIBA Women's Asia Cup:
  - Japan
  - China
  - South Korea
  - New Zealand
  - Chinese Taipei
  - Philippines
- Division B winners of the 2021 FIBA Women's Asia Cup:
  - Lebanon

For Division B:

- The host nation
  - Thailand
- Early registrants for the Division B slots from FIBA Asia:
  - Indonesia
  - Iran
  - Jordan
  - Kazakhstan
  - Malaysia
  - Mongolia
  - Sri Lanka

== Squads ==
Each nation had to submit a list of 12 players.

== Division A ==
=== Preliminary round ===
All times are local (UTC+10:00).

==== Group A ====
Pos	Team	Pld	W	L	PF	PA	PD	Pts	Qualification
1	China	3	3	0	256	171	+85	6	Semifinals
2	New Zealand	3	2	1	188	189	−1	5	Playoffs
3	South Korea	3	1	2	221	207	+14	4	Playoffs
4	Lebanon	3	0	3	143	241	−98	3	Seventh place game

Source: FIBA
Rules for classification: 1) Points; 2) Head-to-head results; 3) Points difference; 4) Points scored.

26 June 2023
11:00

Boxscore

South Korea	64–66	New Zealand
Scoring by quarter: 12–20, 13–21, 21–11, 18–14
Pts: Kang, Park Ji-s. 18; Rebs: Park Ji-s. 10; Asts: Park Ji-h. 6		Pts: Davidson 24; Rebs: Reed 11; Asts: Dalton, C. Leger-Walker 3

State Sports Centre, Sydney
Referees: Vaughan Mayberry (AUS), Kumiko Kumagai (JPN), Yana Nikogossyan (KAZ)

26 June 2023
13:30

Boxscore

China	89–44	Lebanon
Scoring by quarter: 24–21, 18–9, 22–2, 25–12
Pts: Han 17; Rebs: Han 10; Asts: Li Yua. 6		Pts: Akl 13; Rebs: Elias 6 Asts: three players 2

State Sports Centre, Sydney
Attendance: 275
Referees: Jacquiline Dover (AUS), Saif Al-Dossari (QAT), Joenard Garcia (PHI)

27 June 2023
11:00

Boxscore

Lebanon	54–76	South Korea
Scoring by quarter: 11–25, 13–23, 11–15, 19–13
Pts: Baptiste 20; Rebs: Baptiste 12; Asts: El Charif, Fayad 2		Pts: Park Ji-h. 18; Rebs: Jin 11; Asts: Shin 7

State Sports Centre, Sydney
Referees: Chuang Chih-chun (TPE), Vaughan Mayberry (AUS), Jacquiline Dover (AUS)

27 June 2023
17:00

Boxscore

New Zealand	46–80	China
Scoring by quarter: 13–18, 7–15, 7–32, 19–15
Pts: Hunter 10; Rebs: Beck 7 Asts: Beck 3		Pts: Han 17; Rebs: Han 13; Asts: Li Yua. 7

State Sports Centre, Sydney
Referees: Harja Jaladri (INA), Kumiko Kumagai (JPN), Leong Chuen Wing (SGP)

28 June 2023
11:00

Boxscore

New Zealand	76–45	Lebanon
Scoring by quarter: 17–6, 22–11, 16–12, 21–16
Pts: Tupaea 20; Rebs: Davidson 13; Asts: Beck 5		Pts: Baptiste 11; Rebs: Baptiste 7 Asts: Baptiste 4

State Sports Centre, Sydney
Referees: Chuang Chih-chun (TPE), Joenard Garcia (PHI), Yana Nikogossyan (KAZ)

28 June 2023
17:00

Boxscore

China	87–81 (OT)	South Korea
Scoring by quarter: 12–21, 20–17, 21–16, 19–18, Overtime: 15–9
Pts: Han 33; Rebs: Han, Zhang 11; Asts: Li M. 7		Pts: Park Ji-s. 22; Rebs: Park Ji-s. 8 Asts: Park Ji-h. 5

State Sports Centre, Sydney
Referees: Preeda Muongmee (THA), Chan Owe Shiong (MAS), Jacquiline Dover (AUS)

==== Group B ====
Pos	Team	Pld	W	L	PF	PA	PD	Pts	Qualification
1	Japan	3	3	0	280	176	+104	6	Semifinals
2	Australia	3	2	1	262	170	+92	5	Playoffs
3	Philippines	3	1	2	183	281	−98	4	Playoffs
4	Chinese Taipei	3	0	3	179	277	−98	3	Seventh place game

Source: FIBA
Rules for classification: 1) Points; 2) Head-to-head results; 3) Points difference; 4) Points scored.

26 June 2023
17:00

Boxscore

Japan	94–53	Chinese Taipei
Scoring by quarter: 21–14, 19–17, 26–12, 28–10
Pts: Mawuli 18; Rebs: Mawuli 9 Asts: Yamamoto 7		Pts: Lin Y. 14; Rebs: Han, Lin Y. 6 Asts: Lin Y. 4

State Sports Centre, Sydney
Attendance: 500
Referees: Preeda Muongmee (THA), Ryan Jones (NZL), Lee Ji-youn (KOR)

26 June 2023
19:30

Boxscore

Australia	105–34	Philippines
Scoring by quarter: 30–7, 26–16, 22–5, 27–6
Pts: Garbin 18; Rebs: Scherf 9 Asts: Madgen 7		Pts: De Jesus 18; Rebs: Animam 7 Asts: three players 1

State Sports Centre, Sydney
Referees: Harja Jaladri (INA), Yu Yijing (CHN), Paul Skayem (LBN)

27 June 2023
13:30

Boxscore

Philippines	57–95	Japan
Scoring by quarter: 14–28, 17–21, 17–17, 9–29
Pts: Bernardino, De Jesus 12; Rebs: Bernardino 8 Asts: De Jesus 4		Pts: Akaho 16; Rebs: Okoye 9 Asts: Hoshi 7

State Sports Centre, Sydney
Referees: Lee Ji-youn (KOR), Chan Owe Shiong (MAS), Callum Welch (NZL)

27 June 2023
19:30

Boxscore

Chinese Taipei	45–91	Australia
Scoring by quarter: 12–19, 12–22, 16–29, 5–21
Pts: Lin Y., Liu H. 8 Rebs: Cheng I., Lin Y. 4 Asts: Lin Y. 3		Pts: Froling 16; Rebs: Maley 15; Asts: Madgen 4

State Sports Centre, Sydney
Referees: Yana Nikogossyan (KAZ), Saif Al-Dossari (QAT), Paul Skayem (LBN)

28 June 2023
13:30

Boxscore

Chinese Taipei	81–92	Philippines
Scoring by quarter: 20–29, 18–22, 24–21, 19–20
Pts: Lin Y. 21; Rebs: Lin Y. 10; Asts: Lin Y. 7		Pts: De Jesus 25; Rebs: Animam 15; Asts: De Jesus 4

State Sports Centre, Sydney
Referees: Lee Ji-youn (KOR), Leong Chuen Wing (SGP), Callum Welch (NZL)

28 June 2023
19:30

Boxscore

Australia	66–91	Japan
Scoring by quarter: 21–15, 11–29, 19–26, 15–21
Pts: Rocci 12; Rebs: Maley 4 Asts: Rocci 5		Pts: Okoye 20; Rebs: Akaho 7 Asts: Miyazaki 6

State Sports Centre, Sydney
Referees: Ryan Jones (NZL), Harja Jaladri (INA), Yu Yijing (CHN)

=== Knockout round ===
==== Bracket ====
Qualification to semifinals
30 June
Australia	91
South Korea	64
30 June
New Zealand	83
Philippines	78

Semi-finals
1 July
China	74
Australia	60
1 July
Japan	88
New Zealand	52

Final
2 July
China	73
Japan	71
Third place
2 July
Australia	81
New Zealand	59

==== Qualification to semifinals ====
30 June 2023
17:00

Boxscore

New Zealand	83–78	Philippines
Scoring by quarter: 21–15, 24–26, 23–28, 15–9
Pts: C. Leger-Walker 34; Rebs: Davidson 10; Asts: C. Leger-Walker 6		Pts: Bernardino, Joson 15; Rebs: Animam 11; Asts: De Jesus 3

State Sports Centre, Sydney
Referees: Paul Skayem (LBN), Vaughan Mayberry (AUS), Leong Chuen Wing (SGP)

30 June 2023
19:30

Boxscore

Australia	91–64	South Korea
Scoring by quarter: 31–16, 21–17, 19–21, 20–10
Pts: Madgen, Scherf 14; Rebs: Scherf 9 Asts: Madgen 5		Pts: Yang In-y. 14; Rebs: Park Ji-h. 4 Asts: An He-j. 8

State Sports Centre, Sydney
Referees: Saif Al-Dossari (QAT), Kumiko Kumagai (JPN), Ryan Jones (NZL)

==== Semifinals ====
1 July 2023
17:00

Boxscore

Japan	88–52	New Zealand
Scoring by quarter: 24–11, 23–14, 19–13, 22–14
Pts: Mawuli 17; Rebs: Mawuli 6 Asts: Miyazaki 5		Pts: C. Leger-Walker 14; Rebs: McGoldrick 9 Asts: Beck 2

State Sports Centre, Sydney
Referees: Saif Al-Dossari (QAT), Chan Owe Shiong (MAS), Joenard Garcia (PHI)

1 July 2023
19:30

Boxscore

China	74–60	Australia
Scoring by quarter: 18–11, 17–21, 18–11, 21–17
Pts: Han 17; Rebs: Han 15; Asts: Wang 6		Pts: Kunek 16; Rebs: Scherf 8 Asts: Heal 3

State Sports Centre, Sydney
Referees: Harja Jaladri (INA), Preeda Muongmee (THA), Leong Chuen Wing (SGP)

==== Seventh place game ====
30 June 2023
14:30

Boxscore

Lebanon	75–73	Chinese Taipei
Scoring by quarter: 21–27, 17–11, 20–13, 17–22
Pts: Akl 27; Rebs: Baptiste 7 Asts: Akl, Baptiste 4		Pts: Cheng W. 25; Rebs: Cheng I. 10; Asts: Pan 5

State Sports Centre, Sydney
Referees: Lee Ji-youn (KOR), Jacquiline Dover (AUS), Yana Nikogossyan (KAZ)

==== Fifth place game ====
1 July 2023
14:30

Boxscore

Philippines	71–80	South Korea
Scoring by quarter: 19–18, 15–26, 21–22, 16–14
Pts: Bernardino 16; Rebs: Bernardino 9 Asts: De Jesus 5		Pts: Park Ji-h. 24; Rebs: Park Ji-s. 16; Asts: Park Ji-s. 4

State Sports Centre, Sydney
Referees: Chuang Chih-chun (TPE), Yu Yijing (CHN), Callum Welch (NZL)

==== Third place game ====
2 July 2023
12:30

Boxscore

Australia	81–59	New Zealand
Scoring by quarter: 22–14, 17–14, 24–17, 18–14
Pts: Kunek 19; Rebs: Maley 11; Asts: Madgen 5		Pts: Davidson 19; Rebs: Davidson 11; Asts: K. Leger-Walker 4

State Sports Centre, Sydney
Referees: Chuang Chih-chun (TPE), Kumiko Kumagai (JPN), Yu Yijing (CHN)

==== Final ====
2 July 2023
15:00

Boxscore

China	73–71	Japan
Scoring by quarter: 17–17, 9–18, 22–16, 25–20
Pts: Han 26; Rebs: Han 10; Asts: Li M. 6		Pts: Takada 17; Rebs: Akaho 6 Asts: Yamamoto 9

State Sports Centre, Sydney
Referees: Harja Jaladri (INA), Lee Ji-youn (KOR), Preeda Muongmee (THA)

== Division B ==
All times are local (UTC+07:00)

=== Preliminary round ===
==== Group A ====
Pos	Team	Pld	W	L	PF	PA	PD	Pts	Qualification
1	Indonesia	3	3	0	194	163	+31	6	Semifinals
2	Iran	3	2	1	191	157	+34	5	Playoffs
3	Malaysia	3	1	2	199	193	+6	4	Playoffs
4	Mongolia	3	0	3	153	224	−71	3	Seventh place game

Source: FIBA
Rules for classification: 1) Points; 2) Head-to-head results; 3) Points difference; 4) Points scored

13 August 2023
10:00

Boxscore

Indonesia	69–52	Mongolia
Scoring by quarter: 17–10, 16–11, 16–18, 20–13
Pts: Pierre-Louis 19; Rebs: Pierre-Louis 9 Asts: Retong 11		Pts: Bat-Erdene 9 Rebs: Bat-Erdene 8 Asts: Nandinkhusel 3

Bangkok

13 August 2023
12:30

Boxscore

Iran	65–59	Malaysia
Scoring by quarter: 17–18, 21–13, 19–17, 8–11
Pts: Esmaeilzadeh 13; Rebs: Esmaeilzadeh 7 Asts: Shojaei 3		Pts: Yap 28; Rebs: Yap 9 Asts: Low 4

Bangkok

14 August 2023
10:00

Boxscore

Malaysia	55–60	Indonesia
Scoring by quarter: 18–19, 17–17, 13–11, 7–13
Pts: Yap 16; Rebs: Foo 9 Asts: Saw 7		Pts: Pierre-Louis 22; Rebs: Pierre-Louis 12; Asts: Kusuma 5

Bangkok

14 August 2023
12:30

Boxscore

Mongolia	33–70	Iran
Scoring by quarter: 8–16, 6–12, 10–26, 9–16
Pts: Nandinkhusel 9 Rebs: Murat 8 Asts: Nandinkhusel 2		Pts: Vakili 13; Rebs: Eissaian 9 Asts: Yazdian 5

Bangkok

15 August 2023
10:00

Boxscore

Indonesia	65–56	Iran
Scoring by quarter: 19–13, 8–15, 13–16, 25–12
Pts: Pierre-Louis 26; Rebs: Pierre-Louis 15; Asts: Retong 6		Pts: Rasoulipour 16; Rebs: Rasoulipour 5 Asts: Rasoulipour 3

Bangkok

15 August 2023
12:30

Boxscore

Malaysia	85–68	Mongolia
Scoring by quarter: 22–18, 32–10, 15–20, 16–20
Pts: Yap 20; Rebs: Foo 7 Asts: Saw 9		Pts: Bat-Erdene 14; Rebs: Bat-Erdene 10; Asts: Nandinkhusel 7

Bangkok

==== Group B ====
Pos	Team	Pld	W	L	PF	PA	PD	Pts	Qualification
1	Jordan	3	3	0	230	177	+53	6	Semifinals
2	Thailand	3	2	1	244	161	+83	5	Playoffs
3	Kazakhstan	3	1	2	182	180	+2	4	Playoffs
4	Sri Lanka	3	0	3	111	249	−138	3	Seventh place game

Updated to match(es) played on 13 August 2023. Source: FIBA
Rules for classification: 1) Points; 2) Head-to-head results; 3) Points difference; 4) Points scored

13 August 2023
15:00

Boxscore

Kazakhstan	66–34	Sri Lanka
Scoring by quarter: 23–8, 18–6, 17 –8, 8–12
Pts: Yagodkina 16; Rebs: Bezgodova 12; Asts: Bezgodova 3		Pts: Ekanayake 7 Rebs: Arachchige 6 Asts: Ekanayake 3

Bangkok

13 August 2023
17:30

Boxscore

Jordan	74–71	Thailand
Scoring by quarter: 22–13, 18–15, 20–20, 14–23
Pts: Al Hinn 26; Rebs: Al Hinn 11; Asts: Sheppard 6		Pts: Udomsuk 19; Rebs: Lumdappang 12; Asts: Thuamon 8

Bangkok

14 August 2023
15:00

Boxscore

Sri Lanka	41–82	Jordan
Scoring by quarter: 8–15, 12–26, 11–26, 10–15
Pts: Arachchige 11; Rebs: Arachchige 10; Asts: Ravindran 4		Pts: Sheppard 19; Rebs: Al Hinn 10; Asts: Sheppard 4

Bangkok

14 August 2023
17:30

Boxscore

Thailand	72–51	Kazakhstan
Scoring by quarter: 25–15, 17–16, 11–9, 19–11
Pts: Udomsuk 22; Rebs: Lumdappang 7 Asts: Lumdappang 6		Pts: Bezgodova 13; Rebs: Bezgodova 14; Asts: Bagmet 5

Bangkok

15 August 2023
15:00

Boxscore

Kazakhstan	65–74	Jordan
Scoring by quarter: 18–19, 13–13, 13–21, 21–21
Pts: Yagodkina 20; Rebs: Bezgodova 9 Asts: Yagodkina 6		Pts: Sheppard 38; Rebs: Al Hinn 9 Asts: Sheppard 8

Bangkok

15 August 2023
17:30

Boxscore

Thailand	101–36	Sri Lanka
Scoring by quarter: 28–12, 24–7, 27–8, 22–9
Pts: Boonjun 16; Rebs: Boonjun 11; Asts: Summat 8		Pts: Ekanayake 14; Rebs: Morseth 9 Asts: Mills 2

Bangkok

=== Knockout round ===
==== Bracket ====
Qualification to Semi-finals
17 August
Thailand	67
Malaysia	58
17 August
Iran	54
Kazakhstan	41

Semi-finals
18 August
Indonesia	65
Thailand	57
18 August
Jordan	54
Iran	72

Final
19 August
Indonesia	55
Iran	54
Third place
19 August
Thailand	66
Jordan	52

==== Qualification to Semifinals ====
17 August 2023
15:00

Boxscore

Thailand	67–58	Malaysia
Scoring by quarter: 16 - 19, 11- 13, 18 - 16, 22 - 10
Pts: Udomsuk 21; Rebs: Udomsuk 8 Asts: Thuamon 6		Pts: Low 14; Rebs: Pang 9 Asts: Saw 5

Bangkok

17 August 2023
17:30

Boxscore

Iran	54–41	Kazakhstan
Scoring by quarter: 20 - 12, 8 - 7, 14 - 15, 12 - 7
Pts: Rasoulipour 16; Rebs: Abedi 8 Asts: Rasoulipour 3		Pts: Bezgodova 15; Rebs: Bezgodova 6 Asts: Koroleva 4

Bangkok

==== Seventh place game ====
17 August 2023
12:30

Boxscore

Mongolia	80–41	Sri Lanka
Scoring by quarter: 17 - 7, 23 - 14, 32 - 11, 8 - 9
Pts: Baatar 24; Rebs: Bat-Erdene 12; Asts: Bayarmaa 9		Pts: Thalagala 18; Rebs: Morseth 5 Asts: Ekanayake 4

Bangkok

==== Fifth place game ====
18 August 2023
12:30

Boxscore

Malaysia	62–44	Kazakhstan
Scoring by quarter: 17 - 10, 20 - 5, 17 - 21, 8 - 8
Pts: Yap 16; Rebs: Tan 8 Asts: Pang 4		Pts: Yagodkina 18; Rebs: Yagodkina 8 Asts: Bagmet 5

Bangkok

==== Semifinals ====
18 August 2023
15:00

Boxscore

Indonesia	65–57	Thailand
Scoring by quarter: 18 - 12, 16 - 15, 14 - 17, 17 - 13
Pts: Pierre-Louis 12; Rebs: Pierre-Louis 14; Asts: Retong 7		Pts: Thuamon 18; Rebs: Udomsuk 7 Asts: Thuamon 5

Bangkok

18 August 2023
17:30

Boxscore

Jordan	54–72	Iran
Scoring by quarter: 19 - 26, 10 - 15, 15 - 18, 10 - 13
Pts: Sheppard 24; Rebs: Al Hinn 6 Asts: Sheppard 5		Pts: Shahriari 22; Rebs: Rasoulipour 7 Asts: Rasoulipour 8

Bangkok

==== Third place game ====
19 August 2023
15:00

Boxscore

Thailand	66–52	Jordan
Scoring by quarter: 17–15, 8–15, 14–12, 27–10
Pts: Udomsuk 17; Rebs: Lumdappang 13; Asts: Thuamon 5		Pts: Abu Jbara 14; Rebs: Abu Jbara 12; Asts: Abu Jbara 3

Bangkok

==== Final ====
This is also a promotion playoff, with the loser retaining Division B status, while the winner promoted to Division A.

19 August 2023
17:30

Boxscore

Indonesia	55–54	Iran
Scoring by quarter: 12–16, 12–9, 19–14, 12–15
Pts: Orville 16; Rebs: Pierre-Louis 14; Asts: Retong 9		Pts: Shahriari 14; Rebs: Shahriari 5 Asts: Rasoulipour 6

Bangkok

== Final standings ==
=== Division A ===
Qualified for the 2024 FIBA Women's Olympic Qualifying Tournaments
Relegated to Division B of the 2025 FIBA Women's Asia Cup

Rank	Team	Record
1st place, gold medalist(s)	China	5–0
2nd place, silver medalist(s)	Japan	4–1
3rd place, bronze medalist(s)	Australia	4–2
4	New Zealand	3–3
5	South Korea	2–3
6	Philippines	1–4
7	Lebanon	1–3
8	Chinese Taipei	0–4

=== Division B ===
Promoted to Division A of the 2025 FIBA Women's Asia Cup

Rank	Team	Record
1	Indonesia	5–0
2	Iran	4–2
3	Thailand	4–2
4	Jordan	3–2
5	Malaysia	2–3
6	Kazakhstan	1–4
7	Mongolia	1–3
8	Sri Lanka	0–4

== Statistics and awards ==
=== Statistical leaders ===
==== Players ====
Points

Name	PPG
(China) Han Xu	22.0
(New Zealand) Charlisse Leger-Walker	17.3
(China) Li Meng	14.4
(Chinese Taipei) Lin Yu-ting	14.0
(South Korea) Park Ji-hyun	14.0

Rebounds

Name	RPG
(China) Han Xu	11.8
(New Zealand) Penina Davidson	9.8
(Philippines) Jack Animam	9.6
(South Korea) Park Ji-su	8.4
(Lebanon) Trinity Baptiste	7.8

Assists

Name	APG
(Japan) Mai Yamamoto	5.2
(China) Li Meng	4.8
(Japan) Saori Miyazaki	4.8
(Australia) Maddison Rocci	4.2
(Australia) Tess Madgen	4.0
(China) Li Yuan	4.0
(Chinese Taipei) Lin Yu-ting	4.0

Blocks

Name	BPG
(China) Han Xu	2.6
(Japan) Himawari Akaho	1.6
(South Korea) Park Ji-su	1.6
(South Korea) Kim Dan-bi	1.4
(New Zealand) Penina Davidson	1.2

Steals

Name	SPG
(South Korea) Park Ji-hyun	2.4
(Philippines) Afril Bernardino	2.2
(South Korea) Park Ji-su	2.2
(Chinese Taipei) Cheng I-hsiu	2.0
(Japan) Stephanie Mawuli	2.0

Efficiency

Name	EFFPG
(China) Han Xu	29.4
(New Zealand) Penina Davidson	20.0
(Philippines) Jack Animam	17.6
(Chinese Taipei) Lin Yu-ting	17.3
(South Korea) Park Ji-hyun	17.2

==== Teams ====
Points

Team	PPG
Japan	87.8
Australia	82.3
China	80.6
South Korea	73.0
Philippines	66.4

Rebounds

Team	RPG
Australia	47.8
China	45.5
South Korea	39.6
Japan	39.4
New Zealand	39.3

Assists

Team	APG
China	22.6
Japan	22.2
South Korea	20.2
Australia	18.5
Chinese Taipei	17.0

Blocks

Team	BPG
South Korea	4.8
Japan	4.4
New Zealand	3.8
China	3.6
Chinese Taipei	3.0

Steals

Team	SPG
South Korea	10.0
Australia	8.5
Chinese Taipei	8.0
Philippines	8.0
Japan	7.6

Efficiency

Team	EFFPG
Japan	109.6
Australia	101.0
China	99.4
South Korea	82.4
New Zealand	66.0

=== Awards ===
The awards were announced on 2 July 2023.

All-Tournament Team
Guards	Forwards	Center
(Japan) Mai Yamamoto (China) Li Meng	(Australia) Alice Kunek (New Zealand) Penina Davidson	(China) Han Xu
MVP: (China) Han Xu
