= 2023 William Jones Cup =

International basketball tournament

Tournament information
- Dates: M: 12–20 August 2023; W: 5–9 August 2023
- Host(s): Taiwan
- Venue(s): 1
- Teams: M: 9 W: 6
- Website: jonescup.meetagile.com

Final positions
- Champions: M: (United States) UC Irvine Anteaters; W: (Japan) Chanson V-Magic
- 1st runners-up: M: Republic of China Blue; W: (South Korea) Busan BNK Sum
- 2nd runners-up: M: (South Korea) Anyang KGC; W: Republic of China Blue

The 2023 William Jones Cup was the 42nd staging of William Jones Cup, an international basketball tournament held in Taipei, Taiwan. The men's tournament was held from 12 to 20 August 2023, while the women's tournament was held from 5 to 9 August 2023. It was the first tournament since 2019 after the last three planned editions cancelled due to the COVID-19 pandemic.

== Men's tournament ==
=== Participating teams ===
- Iran B
- Japan U22
- (South Korea) Anyang KGC
- (Philippines) Rain or Shine Elasto Painters
- Qatar
- Republic of China Blue
- Republic of China White
- United Arab Emirates
- (United States) UC Irvine Anteaters

=== Team standings ===
| Pos | Team | Pld | W | L | PF | PA | PD | Pts |
|---|---|---|---|---|---|---|---|---|
| 1 | (United States) UC Irvine Anteaters | 8 | 8 | 0 | 816 | 464 | +352 | 16 |
| 2 | Republic of China Blue | 8 | 7 | 1 | 714 | 602 | +112 | 15 |
| 3 | (South Korea) Anyang KGC | 8 | 6 | 2 | 704 | 677 | +27 | 14 |
| 4 | Qatar | 8 | 4 | 4 | 596 | 651 | −55 | 12 |
| 5 | United Arab Emirates | 8 | 3 | 5 | 580 | 705 | −125 | 11 (Note: United Arab Emirates 1–0 Republic of China White) |
| 6 | Republic of China White | 8 | 3 | 5 | 623 | 669 | −46 | 11 |
| 7 | (Philippines) Rain or Shine Elasto Painters | 8 | 2 | 6 | 667 | 736 | −69 | 10 (Note: Rain or Shine Elasto Painters 1–0 Iran B) |
| 8 | Iran B | 8 | 2 | 6 | 596 | 644 | −48 | 10 |
| 9 | Japan U22 | 8 | 1 | 7 | 599 | 747 | −148 | 9 |

Source: William Jones Cup

=== Games ===
==== Day 1 ====
12 August
13:00

Report

| Anyang KGC (South Korea) | 100–84 | United Arab Emirates |
Scoring by quarter: 25–20, 28–19, 20–19, 27–26
| Pts: Maxwell 22; Rebs: Maxwell 15; Asts: Park 12 | | Pts: Alshabebi 32; Rebs: Alshabebi 10; Asts: three players 3 |

Taipei Heping Basketball Gymnasium, Taipei

12 August
15:00

Report

| Qatar | 38–105 | (United States) UC Irvine Anteaters |
Scoring by quarter: 9–25, 10–23, 7–32, 12–25
| Pts: Lewis 13; Rebs: three players 4 Asts: Lewis, Saad 2 | | Pts: Henry 19; Rebs: Ujadughele, H. Welling 6 Asts: Crockrell 11 |

Taipei Heping Basketball Gymnasium, Taipei

12 August
17:00

Report

| Republic of China White | 85–59 | Japan U22 |
Scoring by quarter: 29–9, 25–20, 11–20, 20–10
| Pts: Lin 20; Rebs: Sarr 9 Asts: Pai 6 | | Pts: Nemoto 10; Rebs: Tsukamoto 6 Asts: Nishimura, Tsukamoto 3 |

Taipei Heping Basketball Gymnasium, Taipei

12 August
19:30

Report

| Republic of China Blue | 98–79 | (Philippines) Rain or Shine Elasto Painters |
Scoring by quarter: 40–23, 17–14, 25–12, 16–30
| Pts: Artino 23; Rebs: Lee T. 11; Asts: Lee T. 7 | | Pts: Caracut 18; Rebs: Kouame 16; Asts: Caracut, Evans 3 |

Taipei Heping Basketball Gymnasium, Taipei

==== Day 2 ====
13 August
13:00

Report

| Qatar | 63–69 | Iran B |
Scoring by quarter: 17–16, 16–17, 12–18, 18–18
| Pts: three players 9 Rebs: three players 5 Asts: Fouda 5 | | Pts: Azari 16; Rebs: four players 5 Asts: Dalirzahan 5 |

Taipei Heping Basketball Gymnasium, Taipei

13 August
15:00

Report

| United Arab Emirates | 49–109 | (United States) UC Irvine Anteaters |
Scoring by quarter: 15–25, 8–28, 17–28, 9–28
| Pts: Alshabebi 15; Rebs: Alshabebi 7 Asts: Thomas 3 | | Pts: Saran 22; Rebs: Chol 9 Asts: Crockrell 6 |

Taipei Heping Basketball Gymnasium, Taipei

13 August
17:00

Report

| Rain or Shine Elasto Painters (Philippines) | 79–89 | Republic of China White |
Scoring by quarter: 14–30, 23–24, 18–21, 24–14
| Pts: Kouame 15; Rebs: Kouame 9 Asts: Nambatac 3 | | Pts: A. Hinton 17; Rebs: Sarr 10; Asts: three players 4 |

Taipei Heping Basketball Gymnasium, Taipei

13 August
19:00

Report

| Japan U22 | 68–86 | Republic of China Blue |
Scoring by quarter: 11–27, 18–24, 23–16, 16–19
| Pts: Iwaya, Nemoto 13; Rebs: Iwaya 13; Asts: Iwaya 6 | | Pts: Gadiaga 31; Rebs: Artino 12; Asts: Liu 6 |

Taipei Heping Basketball Gymnasium, Taipei

==== Day 3 ====
14 August
13:00

Report

| Rain or Shine Elasto Painters (Philippines) | 71–73 | United Arab Emirates |
Scoring by quarter: 14–11, 21–22, 18–19, 18–21
| Pts: Demusis, Evans 12; Rebs: Kouame 6 Asts: Mamuyac 5 | | Pts: H. Albreiki 22; Rebs: Alshabebi 9 Asts: Almaazmi 4 |

Taipei Heping Basketball Gymnasium, Taipei

14 August
15:00

Report

| Japan U22 | 47–108 | (United States) UC Irvine Anteaters |
Scoring by quarter: 19–30, 6–26, 8–26, 14–26
| Pts: Ozawa 10; Rebs: Sukegawa 3 Asts: Tsukioka 4 | | Pts: Saran 16; Rebs: Saran 10; Asts: Redfield 6 |

Taipei Heping Basketball Gymnasium, Taipei

14 August
17:00

Report

| Anyang KGC (South Korea) | 84–72 | Iran B |
Scoring by quarter: 28–17, 22–17, 17–18, 17–20
| Pts: Griffin, Maxwell 17; Rebs: Kim K. 7 Asts: Jeong 5 | | Pts: Azari 15; Rebs: Jafari, Rahimi 7 Asts: Heydari 5 |

Taipei Heping Basketball Gymnasium, Taipei

14 August
19:00

Report

| Republic of China Blue | 88–74 | Qatar |
Scoring by quarter: 19–16, 22–22, 30–22, 17–14
| Pts: three players 21; Rebs: Artino 9 Asts: Lin T. 6 | | Pts: Lewis 17; Rebs: Muslic 8 Asts: Lewis 3 |

Taipei Heping Basketball Gymnasium, Taipei

==== Day 4 ====
15 August
13:00

Report

| UC Irvine Anteaters (United States) | 87–82 | (South Korea) Anyang KGC |
Scoring by quarter: 21–27, 27–17, 24–21, 15–17
| Pts: Crockrell 14; Rebs: Keeler 13; Asts: Crockrell 10 | | Pts: Griffin 25; Rebs: Maxwell 10; Asts: Maxwell 7 |

Taipei Heping Basketball Gymnasium, Taipei

15 August
15:00

Report

| Qatar | 93–86 | (Philippines) Rain or Shine Elasto Painters |
Scoring by quarter: 20–24, 27–24, 22–20, 24–18
| Pts: Lewis 19; Rebs: Avdic 11; Asts: Lewis 6 | | Pts: Evans 20; Rebs: Kouame 9 Asts: Belga, Kouame 3 |

Taipei Heping Basketball Gymnasium, Taipei

15 August
17:00

Report

| United Arab Emirates | 71–69 | Republic of China White |
Scoring by quarter: 14–24, 25–13, 14–22, 18–10
| Pts: Alshabebi 21; Rebs: Alshabebi 9 Asts: H. Albreiki 7 | | Pts: R. Hinton 12; Rebs: Sarr 11; Asts: Lin, Pai 4 |

Taipei Heping Basketball Gymnasium, Taipei

15 August
19:00

Report

| Iran B | 63–80 | Republic of China Blue |
Scoring by quarter: 9–15, 8–26, 29–13, 17–26
| Pts: Yazarloo 17; Rebs: Rahimi 9 Asts: Azari 4 | | Pts: Artino 29; Rebs: Artino 12; Asts: Tseng W. 5 |

Taipei Heping Basketball Gymnasium, Taipei

==== Day 5 ====
16 August
13:00

Report

| Qatar | 81–57 | United Arab Emirates |
Scoring by quarter: 20–13, 24–19, 24–9, 13–16
| Pts: Lewis, Muslic 16; Rebs: Ndao 9 Asts: Ndoye 5 | | Pts: Alshabebi 14; Rebs: Alshabebi 6 Asts: Alsawan 3 |

Taipei Heping Basketball Gymnasium, Taipei

16 August
15:00

Report

| Rain or Shine Elasto Painters (Philippines) | 98–90 (2OT) | Iran B |
Scoring by quarter: 27–19, 15–15, 17–18, 15–22, Overtime: 9–9, 15–7
| Pts: Kouame 20; Rebs: Kouame 9 Asts: three players 4 | | Pts: Azari 16; Rebs: Sharifi 11; Asts: Dalirzahan 7 |

Taipei Heping Basketball Gymnasium, Taipei

16 August
17:00

Report

| Anyang KGC (South Korea) | 97–89 | Japan U22 |
Scoring by quarter: 20–20, 18–21, 27–18, 32–30
| Pts: Go 23; Rebs: Jeong, Maxwell 12; Asts: Lee W. 6 | | Pts: Nemoto 18; Rebs: Sukegawa, Tsukioka 7 Asts: three players 4 |

Taipei Heping Basketball Gymnasium, Taipei

16 August
19:00

Report

| Republic of China White | 59–117 | (United States) UC Irvine Anteaters |
Scoring by quarter: 27–32, 8–29, 11–30, 13–26
| Pts: A. Hinton 18; Rebs: Sun 8 Asts: Chen Y. 4 | | Pts: Hohn 18; Rebs: Leuchten 12; Asts: Crockrell 14 |

Taipei Heping Basketball Gymnasium, Taipei

==== Day 6 ====
17 August
13:00

Report

| Iran B | 72–73 | Japan U22 |
Scoring by quarter: 17–12, 12–23, 23–16, 20–22
| Pts: Yazarloo 29; Rebs: Rahimi 14; Asts: Dalirzahan 4 | | Pts: Ozawa 21; Rebs: Sukegawa 8 Asts: Tsukamoto 5 |

Taipei Heping Basketball Gymnasium, Taipei

17 August
15:00

Report

| Republic of China White | 59–71 | Qatar |
Scoring by quarter: 8–18, 23–17, 15–18, 13–18
| Pts: R. Hinton 12; Rebs: Sarr 8 Asts: Pai 4 | | Pts: Lewis 21; Rebs: Muslic 11; Asts: Ndoye 4 |

Taipei Heping Basketball Gymnasium, Taipei

17 August
17:00

Report

| Rain or Shine Elasto Painters (Philippines) | 77–87 | (South Korea) Anyang KGC |
Scoring by quarter: 15–28, 17–14, 19–24, 26–21
| Pts: Caracut 19; Rebs: Kouame 13; Asts: Caracut 4 | | Pts: Park 25; Rebs: Maxwell 9 Asts: Maxwell, Park 6 |

Taipei Heping Basketball Gymnasium, Taipei

17 August
19:00

Report

| United Arab Emirates | 85–103 | Republic of China Blue |
Scoring by quarter: 26–29, 21–29, 19–20, 19–25
| Pts: Alshabebi 29; Rebs: H. Albreiki 8 Asts: H. Albreiki, Alzaabi 4 | | Pts: Artino 24; Rebs: three players 5 Asts: Lin T. 8 |

Taipei Heping Basketball Gymnasium, Taipei

==== Day 7 ====
18 August
13:00

Report

| Qatar | 79–91 | (South Korea) Anyang KGC |
Scoring by quarter: 26–25, 19–24, 16–21, 18–21
| Pts: Haracic, Lewis 12; Rebs: Avdic 10; Asts: Abbasher, Lewis 4 | | Pts: Jeong 26; Rebs: Jeong 6 Asts: Jung 8 |

Taipei Heping Basketball Gymnasium, Taipei

18 August
15:00

Report

| Japan U22 | 76–86 | United Arab Emirates |
Scoring by quarter: 17–19, 22–28, 12–20, 25–19
| Pts: Ozawa 20; Rebs: Kato 7 Asts: Tsukamoto, Tsukioka 6 | | Pts: Alameri 20; Rebs: Alameri 20; Asts: Alameri, Thomas 4 |

Taipei Heping Basketball Gymnasium, Taipei

18 August
17:00

Report

| UC Irvine Anteaters (United States) | 80–48 | Iran B |
Scoring by quarter: 12–10, 24–14, 21–14, 23–10
| Pts: Henry 16; Rebs: Saran 9 Asts: Ujadughele 4 | | Pts: Taheri 11; Rebs: Taheri 6 Asts: Mokarian 5 |

Taipei Heping Basketball Gymnasium, Taipei

18 August
19:00

Report

| Republic of China Blue | 87–74 | Republic of China White |
Scoring by quarter: 27–13, 18–14, 16–25, 26–22
| Pts: Lin B. 25; Rebs: Artino 15; Asts: Liu 4 | | Pts: R. Hinton 21; Rebs: Sarr 15; Asts: Chen Y. 6 |

Taipei Heping Basketball Gymnasium, Taipei

==== Day 8 ====
19 August
13:00

Report

| United Arab Emirates | 75–96 | Iran B |
Scoring by quarter: 26–26, 16–29, 16–22, 17–19
| Pts: Alameri 18; Rebs: M. Albreiki 4 Asts: Thomas 5 | | Pts: Dalirzahan 23; Rebs: Sharifi 11; Asts: Dalirzahan 7 |

Taipei Heping Basketball Gymnasium, Taipei

19 August
15:00

Report

| Japan U22 | 91–116 | (Philippines) Rain or Shine Elasto Painters |
Scoring by quarter: 40–21, 17–30, 19–32, 15–33
| Pts: Sukegawa 22; Rebs: Nemoto, Ozawa 3 Asts: Ozawa 4 | | Pts: Santillan 20; Rebs: Kouame 10; Asts: Caracut 9 |

Taipei Heping Basketball Gymnasium, Taipei

19 August
17:00

Report

| Anyang KGC (South Korea) | 99–97 | Republic of China White |
Scoring by quarter: 32–30, 22–20, 23–25, 22–22
| Pts: Go, Maxwell 23; Rebs: Maxwell 9 Asts: Maxwell 9 | | Pts: Ma 20; Rebs: Lin 7 Asts: Pai 4 |

Taipei Heping Basketball Gymnasium, Taipei

19 August
19:00

Report

| UC Irvine Anteaters (United States) | 95–80 | Republic of China Blue |
Scoring by quarter: 16–19, 25–15, 36–25, 18–21
| Pts: Thoerner 19; Rebs: Jadughele 9 Asts: Jadughele 9 | | Pts: Lin T. 19; Rebs: Artino 5 Asts: Lin T. 6 |

Taipei Heping Basketball Gymnasium, Taipei

==== Day 9 ====
20 August
13:00

Report

| Qatar | 97–96 | Japan U22 |
Scoring by quarter: 24–21, 23–37, 21–14, 29–24
| Pts: Lewis 32; Rebs: Muslic 15; Asts: Avdic, Muslic 5 | | Pts: Nemoto 17; Rebs: Sukegawa 5 Asts: Ozawa 6 |

Taipei Heping Basketball Gymnasium, Taipei

20 August
15:00

Report

| Rain or Shine Elasto Painters (Philippines) | 61–115 | (United States) UC Irvine Anteaters |
Scoring by quarter: 6–26, 21–31, 18–26, 16–32
| Pts: Caracut 14; Rebs: Belga, Kouame 5 Asts: Belga 5 | | Pts: Saran 23; Rebs: Saran 19; Asts: Hohn 6 |

Taipei Heping Basketball Gymnasium, Taipei

20 August
17:00

Report

| Republic of China White | 91–86 | Iran B |
Scoring by quarter: 25–15, 25–27, 15–20, 26–24
| Pts: R. Hinton 18; Rebs: five players 4 Asts: Pai 6 | | Pts: Dalirzahan 24; Rebs: Rahimi, Sharifi 7 Asts: Mokarian 5 |

Taipei Heping Basketball Gymnasium, Taipei

20 August
19:00

Report

| Republic of China Blue | 92–64 | (South Korea) Anyang KGC |
Scoring by quarter: 22–18, 28–18, 29–12, 13–16
| Pts: Artino 30; Rebs: Artino 17; Asts: Wu 7 | | Pts: Go 14; Rebs: Jung 6 Asts: three players 4 |

Taipei Heping Basketball Gymnasium, Taipei

== Women's tournament ==
=== Participating teams ===
- Iran
- (Japan) Chanson V-Magic
- (South Korea) Busan BNK Sum
- Philippines
- Republic of China Blue
- Republic of China White

=== Team standings ===
| Pos | Team | Pld | W | L | PF | PA | PD | Pts |
|---|---|---|---|---|---|---|---|---|
| 1 | (Japan) Chanson V-Magic | 5 | 5 | 0 | 421 | 355 | +66 | 10 |
| 2 | (South Korea) Busan BNK Sum | 5 | 4 | 1 | 395 | 342 | +53 | 9 |
| 3 | Republic of China Blue | 5 | 3 | 2 | 404 | 385 | +19 | 8 |
| 4 | Republic of China White | 5 | 2 | 3 | 354 | 379 | −25 | 7 |
| 5 | Philippines | 5 | 1 | 4 | 379 | 401 | −22 | 6 |
| 6 | Iran | 5 | 0 | 5 | 270 | 361 | −91 | 5 |

Source: William Jones Cup

=== Games ===
==== Day 1 ====
5 August
15:00

Report

| Iran | 44–87 | (South Korea) Busan BNK Sum |
Scoring by quarter: 6–22, 12–23, 11–24, 15–18
| Pts: Shojaei 12; Rebs: three players 4 Asts: Khodamoradi, Shojaei 2 | | Pts: Lee 20; Rebs: Kim H. 6 Asts: Ahn 7 |

Taipei Heping Basketball Gymnasium, Taipei

5 August
17:00

Report

| Republic of China White | 65–76 | (Japan) Chanson V-Magic |
Scoring by quarter: 25–20, 13–26, 5–16, 22–14
| Pts: Zhang Y. 22; Rebs: Zhang Y. 10; Asts: Liu 5 | | Pts: Kaneda 12; Rebs: Uche 10; Asts: Yuri 5 |

Taipei Heping Basketball Gymnasium, Taipei

5 August
19:30

Report

| Republic of China Blue | 89–85 | Philippines |
Scoring by quarter: 30–17, 21–23, 18–21, 20–24
| Pts: Chen Y. 20; Rebs: Chen W. 8 Asts: Chen W. 5 | | Pts: Pontejos 19; Rebs: dela Rosa 10; Asts: Bernardino 5 |

Taipei Heping Basketball Gymnasium, Taipei

==== Day 2 ====
6 August
15:00

Report

| Philippines | 64–58 | Iran |
Scoring by quarter: 13–9, 10–21, 26–9, 15–9
| Pts: dela Rosa, Joson 12; Rebs: Animam 15; Asts: three players 4 | | Pts: Rasoulipour 18; Rebs: Shojaei 12; Asts: seven players 1 |

Taipei Heping Basketball Gymnasium, Taipei

6 August
17:00

Report

| Busan BNK Sum (South Korea) | 77–65 | Republic of China White |
Scoring by quarter: 19–15, 28–18, 11–12, 19–20
| Pts: Jin 19; Rebs: Jin 11; Asts: Ahn, Park K. 6 | | Pts: Lin 15; Rebs: Liu, Wang 7 Asts: Wang 3 |

Taipei Heping Basketball Gymnasium, Taipei

6 August
19:00

Report

| Chanson V-Magic (Japan) | 93–83 | Republic of China Blue |
Scoring by quarter: 20–24, 31–21, 22–23, 20–15
| Pts: Yoshida 23; Rebs: Yoshida 8 Asts: Shirasaki 7 | | Pts: Chen Y. 17; Rebs: Cheng 7 Asts: Pan 6 |

Taipei Heping Basketball Gymnasium, Taipei

==== Day 3 ====
7 August
15:00

Report

| Busan BNK Sum (South Korea) | 73–98 | (Japan) Chanson V-Magic |
Scoring by quarter: 18–26, 25–25, 12–21, 18–26
| Pts: Jin 17; Rebs: Jin 8 Asts: Ahn 8 | | Pts: Yoshida 20; Rebs: Uche 11; Asts: Koike 9 |

Taipei Heping Basketball Gymnasium, Taipei

7 August
17:00

Report

| Republic of China White | 94–83 | Philippines |
Scoring by quarter: 23–21, 25–20, 20–23, 26–19
| Pts: Tai 19; Rebs: Zhang 9 Asts: Wang 6 | | Pts: Bernardino 22; Rebs: Animam 9 Asts: Pontejos 4 |

Taipei Heping Basketball Gymnasium, Taipei

7 August
19:00

Report

| Republic of China Blue | 77–58 | Iran |
Scoring by quarter: 26–14, 15–13, 18–15, 18–16
| Pts: Chen Y. 20; Rebs: Chen W. 6 Asts: Chang 6 | | Pts: Vakili 21; Rebs: Esmaeilzadeh Soudjani 12; Asts: Rasoulipour 7 |

Taipei Heping Basketball Gymnasium, Taipei

==== Day 4 ====
8 August
15:00

Report

| Philippines | 59–65 | (South Korea) Busan BNK Sum |
Scoring by quarter: 8–18, 16–22, 17–17, 18–8
| Pts: dela Rosa 14; Rebs: dela Rosa 15; Asts: del Carmen 5 | | Pts: Lee 19; Rebs: Jin 6 Asts: Ahn 6 |

Taipei Heping Basketball Gymnasium, Taipei

8 August
17:00

Report

| Iran | 46–59 | (Japan) Chanson V-Magic |
Scoring by quarter: 6–15, 7–21, 18–10, 15–13
| Pts: Abedi 14; Rebs: Abedi 6 Asts: Rasoulipour 4 | | Pts: Uche 15; Rebs: Uche 11; Asts: Kaneda 3 |

Taipei Heping Basketball Gymnasium, Taipei

8 August
19:00

Report

| Republic of China White | 56–79 | Republic of China Blue |
Scoring by quarter: 13–15, 11–26, 16–23, 16–15
| Pts: Liu 14; Rebs: Liu 7 Asts: three players 2 | | Pts: Cheng 19; Rebs: Cheng 9 Asts: Chen W. 6 |

Taipei Heping Basketball Gymnasium, Taipei

==== Day 5 ====
9 August
15:00

Report

| Chanson V-Magic (Japan) | 95–88 | Philippines |
Scoring by quarter: 25–17, 19–24, 21–28, 30–19
| Pts: Takanohashi 32; Rebs: Koike 7 Asts: Koike 12 | | Pts: Pontejos 20; Rebs: Animam 10; Asts: del Carmen 7 |

Taipei Heping Basketball Gymnasium, Taipei

9 August
17:00

Report

| Iran | 64–74 | Republic of China White |
Scoring by quarter: 15–19, 19–21, 18–20, 12–14
| Pts: Esmaeilzadeh Soudjani 14; Rebs: Shahriari 6 Asts: Rasoulipour 6 | | Pts: Wang 17; Rebs: Wang 9 Asts: Lin 4 |

Taipei Heping Basketball Gymnasium, Taipei

9 August
19:00

Report

| Republic of China Blue | 76–93 | (South Korea) Busan BNK Sum |
Scoring by quarter: 20–21, 18–25, 19–23, 19–24
| Pts: Chen Y. 23; Rebs: Cheng 5 Asts: Chen M., Chen Y. 5 | | Pts: Lee 31; Rebs: three players 6 Asts: Ahn 9 |

Taipei Heping Basketball Gymnasium, Taipei
