= Yoon Ye-bin =

South Korean basketball player (born 1997)

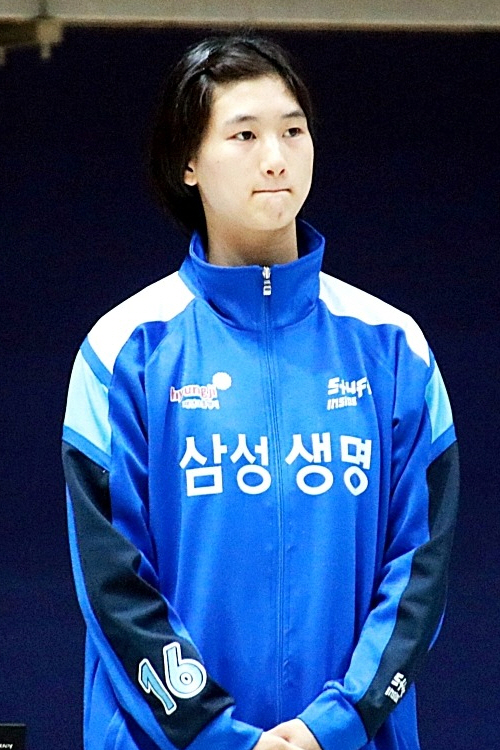
- Yoon Ye-bin in 2016

Samsung Life Blueminx
- Position: Point guard
- League: Women's Korean Basketball League

Personal information
- Born: 16 April 1997 (age 29) Boryeong, South Chungcheong Province, South Korea
- Listed height: 180 cm (5 ft 11 in)

Career information
- High school: Onyang Girls' High School

Yoon Ye-bin (Korean: 윤예빈; born 16 April 1997) is a South Korean basketball player who plays as a point guard for the Women's Korean Basketball League club Samsung Life Blueminx. She also competed in the 2020 Summer Olympics as part of the South Korean national team.

== Early life ==
Yoon Ye-bin was born on 16 April 1997 in Boryeong. She was educated at Boryeong Daecheon Elementary School and later at Onyang Girls' High School.

== Career ==
In 2015, Yoon was selected as the first overall pick in the first round by the Samsung Life Blueminx at the 2016 WKBL Rookie Draft. However, due to a pre-existing ACL injury, she did not play during the 2015–16 season. Yoon made her professional debut during the following 2016–17 season on 24 February 2017 during a game against Incheon Shinhan Bank S-Birds. She played for ten minutes off the bench, recording 2 rebounds and 2 steals.

On 13 January 2020, Yoon was selected for the South Korean women's national team to compete in the final qualifiers for the 2020 Summer Olympics.
