= Kim Dan-bi =

South Korean basketball player

Kim Dan-bi 김단비
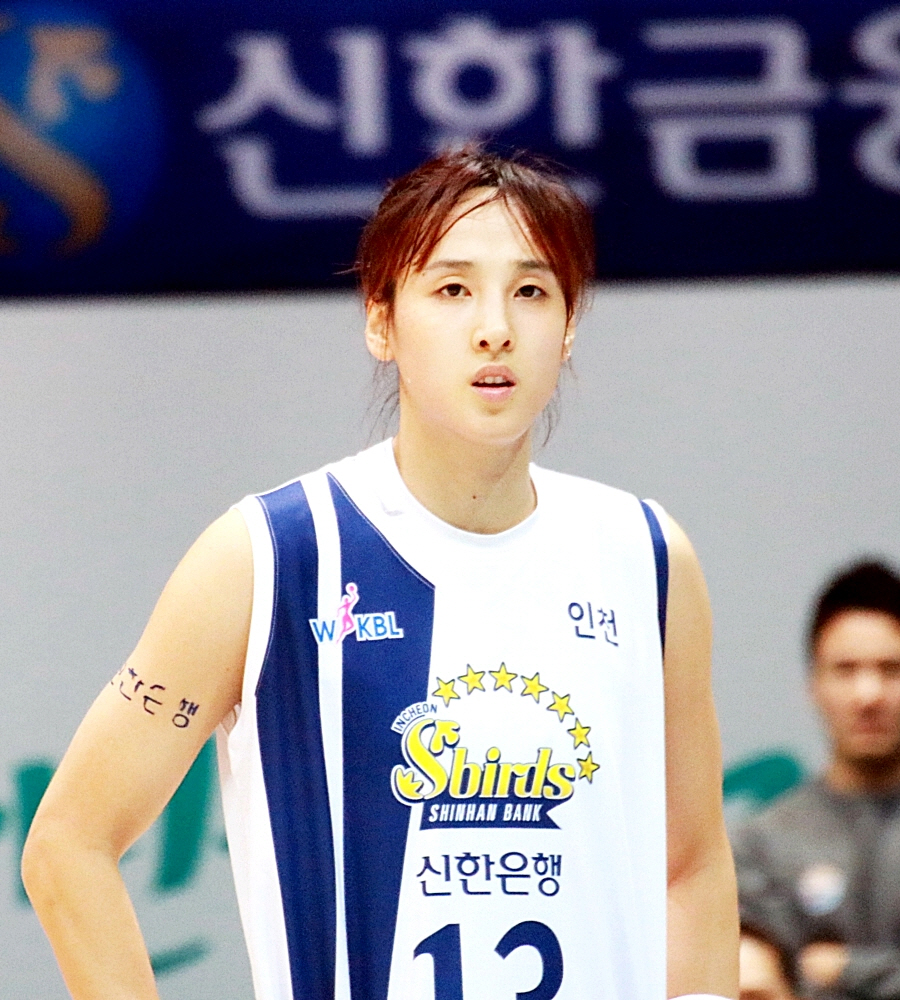

No. 13 – Incheon Shinhan Bank S-Birds
- Position: Forward
- League: WKBL

Personal information
- Born: February 27, 1990 (age 36) Incheon, South Korea
- Listed height: 5 ft 11 in (1.80 m)

Career information
- High school: Myeongsin (Bupyeong-gu, Incheon)
- WNBA draft: 2012: undrafted
- Playing career: 2007–present

Career history
- 2007–2022: Incheon Shinhan Bank S-Birds
- 2022–present: Asan Woori Bank Wibee

Career highlights
- FIBA Asia All-Tournament Team (2015); 5× WKBL champion (2008–2012); 3× WKBL Best 5 (2011, 2012, 2015)
Medals
Women's basketball
Representing South Korea
Asian Games
Gold medal – first place	2014 Incheon	Team
Silver medal – second place	2010 Guangzhou	Team
Bronze medal – third place	2022 Hangzhou	Team
FIBA Asia Cup
Silver medal – second place	2011 Japan
Silver medal – second place	2013 Thailand
Bronze medal – third place	2015 China

Kim Dan-bi (Korean: 김단비; born 27 February 1990) is a South Korean professional basketball player.

== Career ==
=== WKBL ===
In 2007, Kim began her professional career with the Incheon Shinhan Bank S-Birds for the 2007–08 season. Kim has since been a strong, consistent member of the S-Birds roster. In her early years, Kim was a part of a five-year streak of championships. During her time, she has also been awarded a place on the Best 5 team on three occasions.

== National team career ==
=== Youth level ===
Kim made her international debut at the 2007 FIBA Under-19 World Championship in Slovakia, where South Korea placed eighth.

=== Senior level ===
Kim made her debut with the senior national team, at the 2010 FIBA World Championship for Women in the Czech Republic. Kim has since been a constant member of the Korean national team, particularly at the Asian Games and Asian Championships. In 2010, Kim took home the silver in the Asian Games, then in 2014, in her home city of Incheon, South Korea won the gold. At the Asia Cup, in both 2011 and 2013, Kim earned a silver medal at the tournament, whilst taking home the bronze in 2015.
