= Vanessa de Jesus =

Filipino-American basketball player (born 2002)

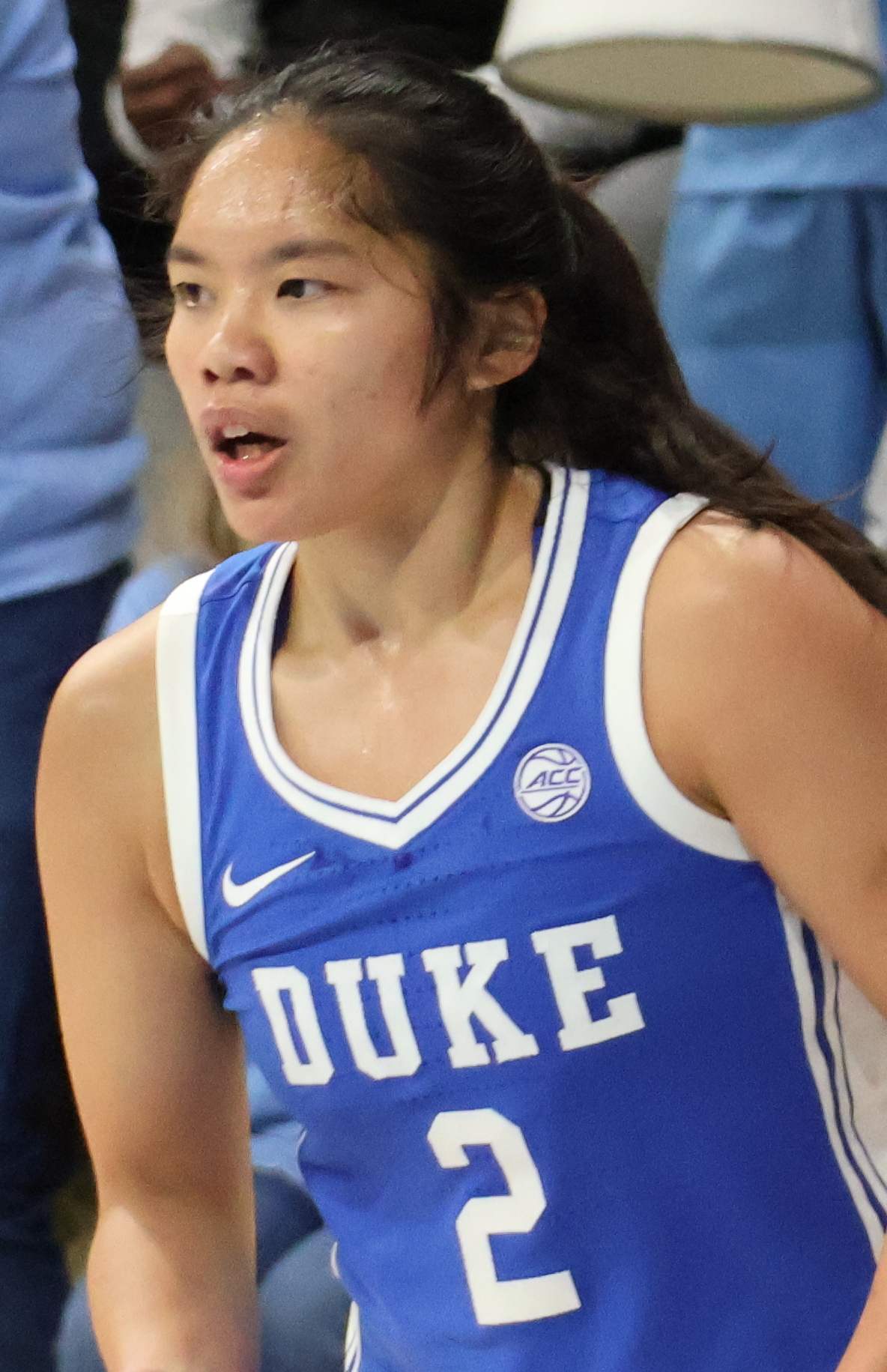
- De Jesus with Duke in 2025

Busan BNK Sum
- Position: Point guard
- League: WKBL

Personal information
- Born: January 17, 2002 (age 24) Northridge, California, U.S.
- Listed height: 5 ft 8 in (1.73 m)

Career information
- High school: Sierra Canyon (Los Angeles, California)
- College: Duke (2020–2025); Notre Dame (2025–2026)
- WNBA draft: 2026: undrafted
- Playing career: 2026–present

Career history
- 2026–present: Busan BNK Sum

Vanessa Ongkeko de Jesus (born January 17, 2002) is a Filipino-American professional basketball player for the Busan BNK Sum of the Women's Korean Basketball League (WKBL). She previously played for the Duke Blue Devils and Notre Dame Fighting Irish.

== Early life and education ==
Vanessa de Jesus was born on January 17, 2002, in Northridge, California, with Valencia considered as her hometown. Her parents Phillip and Maria de Jesus, are both Filipinos. She would attend Sierra Canyon School in Los Angeles before entering Duke University in Durham, North Carolina, for her collegiate studies. She transferred to the University of Notre Dame for the 2025–26 season.

== Career ==
=== College ===
De Jesus committed to play for the Duke Blue Devils in the NCAA Division I in May 2019 which was then under coach Joanne P. McCallie. De Jesus would only be the player who had committed to remain with the Blue Devils after McCallie left.

She debuted for the team now coached by Kara Lawson in November 2020, becoming the first Filipino in Duke University's women's basketball program.

In April 2025, De Jesus announced that she will transfer to Notre Dame and play for the Notre Dame Fighting Irish. She played for Notre Dame in the 2025–26 NCAA season.

=== Professional ===
De Jesus declared her entry to the 2026 draft for the Women's National Basketball Association (WNBA) in April 2026. She was left undrafted during the event.

In June 2026, De Jesus was signed in by Busan BNK Sum for the 2026–27 season of the Women's Korean Basketball League.

=== National team ===
De Jesus has expressed interest to suit up for the Philippines national team as early as 2020. She would obtain her Philippine passport in May 2023 at age 21, making her eligible to play as a "naturalized player" according to FIBA eligibility rules. She debuted for the Philippines at the 2023 FIBA Women's Asia Cup.

== Career statistics ==
Legend
GP	Games played	GS	Games started	MPG	Minutes per game	RPG	Rebounds per game
APG	Assists per game	SPG	Steals per game	BPG	Blocks per game	PPG	Points per game
TO	Turnovers per game	FG%	Field-goal percentage	3P%	3-point field-goal percentage	FT%	Free-throw percentage
**Bold**	Career best	°	League leader

=== College ===
Year	Team	GP	GS	MPG	FG%	3P%	FT%	RPG	APG	SPG	BPG	TO	PPG
2020–21	Duke	4	4	33.3	**54.5**	**50.0**	60.0	**3.8**	**3.8**	0.0	**0.3**	2.0	**12.0**
2021–22	Duke	30	**13**	19.5	36.7	27.1	62.1	2.3	2.3	0.5	0.1	1.6	4.2
2022–23	Duke	32	1	15.5	42.7	34.8	89.2	2.1	1.5	0.8	0.0	1.3	5.0
2024–25	Duke	**36**	0	12.4	47.6	36.1	68.0	1.4	1.8	0.6	0.1	**1.0**	3.1
2025–26	Notre Dame	**36**	**36**	**34.2**	40.2	40.0	**90.0**	2.8	2.7	**1.8**	0.2	1.9	8.4
**Career**		138	54	20.9	41.7	36.8	78.0	2.2	2.2	0.9	0.1	1.5	5.4
Statistics retrieved from Sports-Reference.
