= Mongolia women's national basketball team =

Mongolia
- FIBA ranking: 74 ▼2 (14 September 2026)
- Joined FIBA: 2000
- FIBA zone: FIBA Asia
- National federation: Mongolian Basketball Association (MBA)
- Coach: (Spain) Fran Garcia
- Nickname: Хөх чононууд (Blue Wolves)

Asia Cup
- Appearances: 1
- Medals: None

Asian Games
- Appearances: 3
- Medals: None
Home	Away

First international
- Mongolia 64–68 Hong Kong (Incheon, South Korea; 23 September 2014)

Biggest win
- Mongolia 80–41 Sri Lanka (Bangkok, Thailand; 17 August 2023)

Biggest defeat
- South Korea 124–41 Mongolia (Hwaseong, South Korea; 28 September 2014)

The Mongolia women's national basketball team (Mongolian: Монголын эмэгтэй сагсан бөмбөгийн шигшээ баг) represents Mongolia in international women's basketball. The national team is controlled by the Mongolian Basketball Association (MBA).

== Asian Games ==
Year	Position	Pld	W	L
(South Korea) 2014	8th	7	3	4
(Indonesia) 2018	8th	7	1	6
(China) 2022	10th	3	0	3
(Japan) 2026				
Total	0/4	17	4	13

== FIBA Women's Asia Cup ==
Year	Position	Pld	W	L
(Australia) 2023 FIBA Women's Asia Cup Division B	7th	3	1	3
(China) 2025 FIBA Women's Asia Cup Division B	4th	5	3	2
(Philippines) 2027 FIBA Women's Asia Cup Division B Did not qualify
Total	0/3	8	4	5

=== Asian Games 2018 ===
17 August	Mongolia	83–79	Hong Kong	Gelora Bung Karno Basketball Hall, Jakarta
18:30	Scoring by quarter: 22–12, 25–26, 17–22, 19–19
	Pts: Bulbul 37; Rebs: Solongo 13; Asts: Önörzayaa 7		Pts: Li T.K. 22; Rebs: Wong P.S., Wong K.M. 7 Asts: Li T.K. 6	Referees: Harja Jaladri (INA), Lee Ji-youn (KOR), Anan Daraghma (PLE)

19 August	Japan	107–35	Mongolia	Gelora Bung Karno Basketball Hall, Jakarta
12:30	Scoring by quarter: 30–11, 34–8, 25–11, 18–5
	Pts: Shinozaki 19; Rebs: Suzuki 15; Asts: Yasuma 9		Pts: Bulbul 16; Rebs: Bayartsetseg 7 Asts: Bulbul 3	Referees: Kim Jong-kuk (KOR), Imran Ali Baig (IND), Johan Christiana (INA)

20 August	China	110–36	Mongolia	Gelora Bung Karno Basketball Hall, Jakarta
12:30	Scoring by quarter: 26–15, 31–9, 26–9, 27–3
	Pts: Li Y.R. 21; Rebs: Li Y.R. 11; Asts: Wang S.Y. 8		Pts: Bulbul 15; Rebs: Enerel 9 Asts: Bulbul 4	Referees: Alexey Stepanenko (KAZ), Snehal Bendke (IND), Lee Ji-youn (KOR)

23 August	Mongolia	39–62	Thailand	Gelora Bung Karno Basketball Hall, Jakarta
12:30	Scoring by quarter: 6–10, 12–13, 12–21, 9–18
	Pts: Bulbul 11; Rebs: Altanzayaa 13; Asts: Bayanjargal 4		Pts: Klanbut, Maihom 11; Rebs: Kunchuan 10; Asts: Kunchuan, Saechua 4	Referees: Yevgeniy Mikheyev (KAZ), Lee Ji-youn (KOR), Haryanto Sutaryo (INA)

=== Classification 5–8 ===
28 August
10:00

Mongolia	51–80	Thailand
Scoring by quarter: 11–17, 12–21, 18–13, 10–29
Pts: Bulbul 11; Rebs: Bulbul 10; Asts: Khulan 4		Pts: Yothanan, Klanbut, Prajuapsook 14; Rebs: Klanbut 9 Asts: Supyen, Klanbut 5

Gelora Bung Karno Basketball Hall, Jakarta
Referees: Lee Ji-youn (KOR), Chen Ying-cheng (TPE), Anan Daraghma (PLE)

=== Classification 7th–8th ===
31 August
10:00

Mongolia	66–82	Indonesia
Scoring by quarter: 6–14, 16–31, 22–17, 22–20
Pts: Bayartsetseg 23; Rebs: Bulbul, Khulan, Enerel 5 Asts: Khulan 8		Pts: Christaline 37; Rebs: Gabriel 13; Asts: Gabriel, Sutjiono 7

Istora Gelora Bung Karno, Jakarta
Referees: Lee Ji-youn (KOR), Watcharin Padungratchadakit (THA), Cui Zhexiong (CHN)

=== FIBA Women s Asian Cup 2023 Division B ===
13 August 2023
10:00

Boxscore

Indonesia	69–52	Mongolia
Scoring by quarter: 17-10, 16-11, 16-18, 20-13
Pts: Kim Pierre-Louis 19; Rebs: Kim Pierre-Louis 9 Asts: Agustin Elya Gradita Retong 11		Pts: Ariuntsetseg Bat-Erdene 9 Rebs: Ariuntsetseg Bat-Erdene 8 Asts: Nyamjav Nandinkhusel 3

Bangkok
Referees: KIM, Bohui (KOR), WICHAIPHIN, Suebpong (THA), KHAZNEH, Elham (JOR)

14 August 2023
12:30

Boxscore

Mongolia	33–70	Iran
Scoring by quarter: 8-16, 6-12, 10-26, 9-16
Pts: Nyamjav Nandinkhusel 9 Rebs: Bulbul Murat 8 Asts: Nyamjav Nandinkhusel 2		Pts: Delaram Vakili 13; Rebs: Edna Eissaianjangi 9 Asts: Kimiya Yazdian Tehrani 5

Bangkok
Referees: KIM, Bohui (KOR), WICHAIPHIN, Suebpong (THA), KHAZNEH, Elham (JOR)

15 August 2023
12:30

Boxscore

Malaysia	85–68	Mongolia
Scoring by quarter: 22-18, 32-10, 15-20, 16-20
Pts: Fook Yee Yap 20; Rebs: Suet Ying Foo 7 Asts: Wei Yin Saw 9		Pts: Ariuntsetseg Bat-Erdene 14; Rebs: Ariuntsetseg Bat-Erdene 10; Asts: Nyamjav Nandinkhusel 7

Bangkok
Referees: LEONG, Chuen Wing (SGP) KHAZNEH, Elham (JOR) SRISAWAT, Chitchanok (THA)

=== Seventh place game ===
17 August 2023
12:30

Boxscore

Mongolia	80–41	Sri Lanka
Scoring by quarter: 17 - 7, 23 - 14, 32 - 11, 8 - 9
Pts: Bolor-Erdene Baatar 24; Rebs: Ariuntsetseg Bat-Erdene 12; Asts: Tsatsral Bayarmaa 9		Pts: Benika Madhubhashinie Don Thalagala 18; Rebs: Fathima Lubna Mehthab Morseth 5 Asts: Herath Mudiyanselage T Anjalee Ekanayake 4

Bangkok
Referees: NIKOGOSSYAN, Yana (KAZ) JONTAPA, Nattapong (THA) KHAZNEH, Elham (JOR)

=== Basketball at the 2022 Asian Games – Women ===
27 September	Mongolia	46–101	China	Hangzhou Olympic Sports Centre Gymnasium, Ganzhou
20:00	Scoring by quarter: 30–15, 30–11, 21–14, 20–6
	Pts: Onolbaatar 16; Rebs: Murat 7 Asts: Battogtokh 3	Results	Pts: Li Y.R. 18; Rebs: Li Y.R. 11; Asts: Wang 9	Referees: Preeda Muongmee (THA), Issam Al Siyabi (OMA), Cheon Kam-jae (KOR)

29 September	Mongolia	62–68	India	Shaoxing Olympic Sports Centre Gymnasium, Shaoxing
20:00	Scoring by quarter: 16–19, 15–20, 13–16, 18–13
	Pts: Murat 21; Rebs: Baatar 12; Asts: Battogtokh 9	Results	Pts: Senthilkumar 30; Rebs: Senthilkumar 12; Asts: Limaye 7	Referees: Kim Bohui (KOR), Al-Hashedi Taha Mohammed Nasser (YEM)

1 October	Mongolia	64–69	Indonesia	Shaoxing Olympic Sports Centre Gymnasium, Shaoxing
20:00	Scoring by quarter: 15–19, 15–16, 15–13, 24–16
	Pts: Onolbaatar 22; Rebs: Bayarmaa, Baatar 8 Asts: Bayarmaa 5	Results	Pts: Pierre-Louis 44; Rebs: Pierre-Louis 14; Asts: Retong, Orville 5	Referees: Alexey Stepanenko (KAZ), Issam Al Siyabi (OMA), Anan Daraghma (PLE)

=== FIBA Women s Asian Cup 2025 Division B ===
14 July 2025
11:00

Boxscore

Thailand	74–81	Mongolia
Scoring by quarter: 21–17, 21–22, 19–18, 13–24
Pts: Udomsuk 21; Rebs: Thuamon 9 Asts: Bunsiprom 6		Pts: Nandinkhusel 19; Rebs: Onolbaatar 10; Asts: Nandinkhusel 7

Shenzhen Bay Sports Center, Shenzhen
Attendance: 150
Referees: Bathurst, Matthew Ryan (NZL), Takano, Ami (JPN), Marfan, Budi (INA)

15 July 2025
11:00

Boxscore

Mongolia	55–89	Iran
Scoring by quarter: 10–29, 24–16, 10–21, 11–23
Pts: Baattar 14; Rebs: Baatar 11; Asts: Bat-Erdene 5		Pts: Abedi 19; Rebs: Abedi 9 Asts: Khodamoradi 5

Shenzhen Bay Sports Center, Shenzhen
Attendance: 100
Referees: Beker, Scott (AUS), Kim, Bohui (KOR), Bathurst, Matthew Ryan (NZL)

16 July 2025
17:00

Boxscore

Mongolia	82–55	Cook Islands
Scoring by quarter: 30-6, 15-21, 20-19, 17-9
Pts: Bat-Erdene 25; Rebs: Bat-Erdene 10; Asts: Nandinkhusel 6		Pts: Pepe 22; Rebs: Sadler 12; Asts: Kiriau 5

Shenzhen Bay Sports Center, Shenzhen
Attendance: 50
Referees: Hu, JING (CHN), Marfan, Budi (INA), Huang, Yun Hsuan (TPE)

==== Qualification to semifinals ====
18 July 2025

Box Score

Mongolia	78–70	Kazakhstan
'Scoring by quarter: 33–17, 17–18, 16–11, 12–24
Pts: Nandinkhusel 19; Rebs: Onolbaatar 10; Asts: Nandinkhusel 7		Pts: Alishauskaite 21; Rebs: Yakovleva 6 Asts: Bagmet 5

Shenzhen Bay Sports Center, Shenzhen
Attendance: 50
Referees: Cornelio, Glenn (PHI), Kim Bo-hui (KOR), Bathurst, Matthew Ryan (NZL)

=== Semifinals ===
19 July 2025
16:30

Boxscore

Chinese Taipei	92–82	Mongolia
Scoring by quarter: 25–23, 28–14, 18–20, 20–25

Shenzhen Bay Sports Center, Shenzhen

==== Third place game ====
20 July 2025
15:30

Boxscore

Mongolia	73–78	Thailand
Scoring by quarter: 14−24, 21−21, 16−21, 22−12
Pts: Khulan 18; Rebs: Khulan 9 Asts: Tsatsral 7		Pts: Udomsuk 23; Rebs: Kunchuan 14; Asts: Summat 10

Shenzhen Bay Sports Center, Shenzhen
Referees: Samaneh Dehghani (IRI), Taha Al-Hashedi (YEM), Madison Crowley-Long (AUS)

== See also ==
- Mongolia women's national under-19 basketball team
- Mongolia women's national under-17 basketball team
- Mongolia women's national 3x3 team
