= Park Ji-hyun (basketball) =

South Korean basketball player

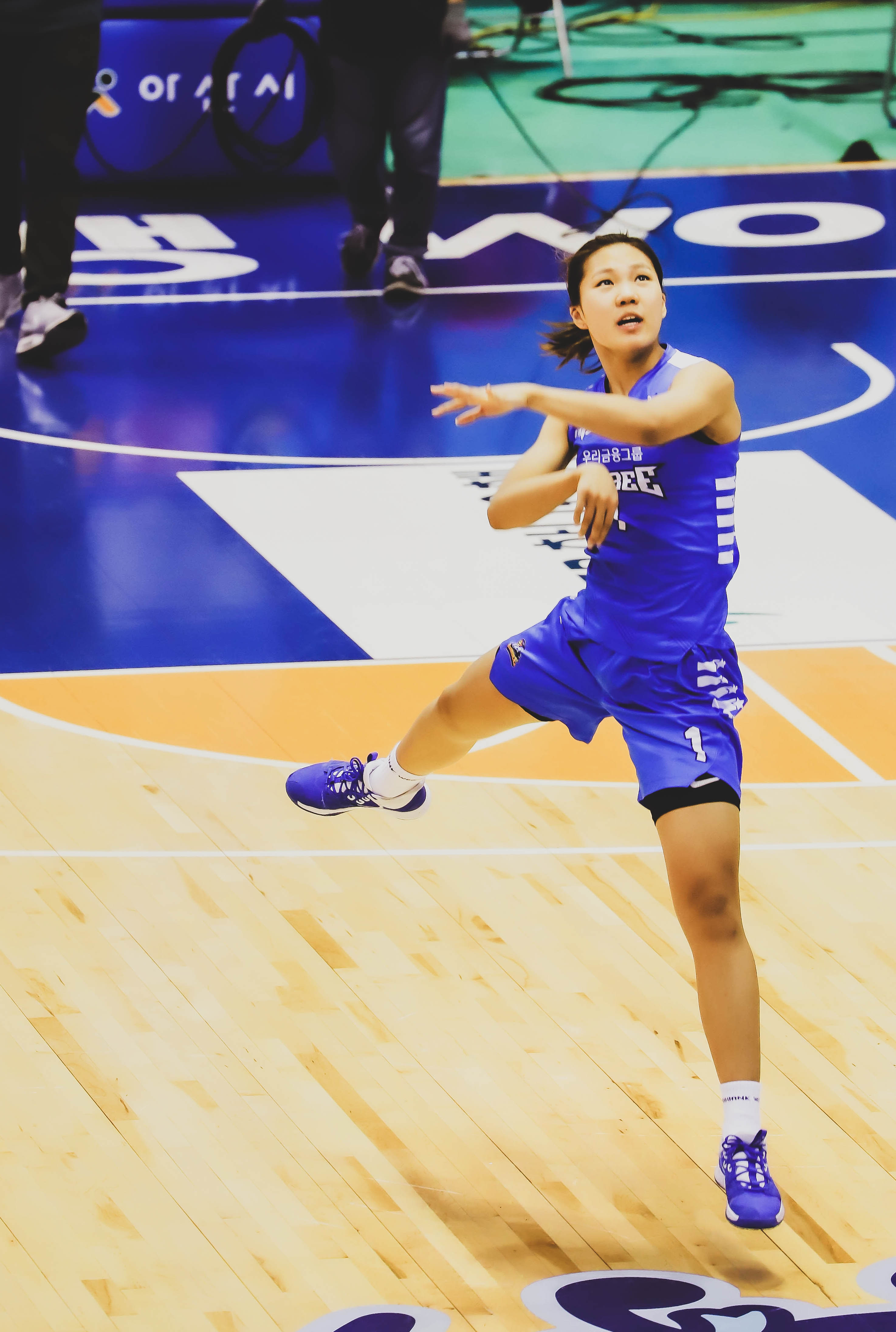
- Park Ji-hyun (2020)

No. 6 – Los Angeles Sparks
- Position: Guard
- League: WNBA

Personal information
- Born: 7 April 2000 (age 26) Seongnam, South Korea
- Listed height: 6 ft 1 in (1.85 m)

Career information
- Playing career: 2018–present

Career history
- 2018–2024: Asan Woori Bank Wibee / WooriWON
- 2024: Bankstown Bruins
- 2024: Tokomanawa Queens
- 2025: Azulmarino Mallorca Palma
- 2025–2026: Tokomanawa Queens
- 2026–: Los Angeles Sparks

Career highlights
- WKBL Rookie of the Year (2019)
- Stats at WNBA.com
- Stats at Basketball Reference
Medals
Women's basketball
Representing South Korea
Asian Games
Bronze medal – third place	2022 Hangzhou	Team
Representing Korea
Asian Games
Silver medal – second place	2018 Jakarta	Team

Park Ji-hyun (Korean: 박지현; born 7 April 2000) is a South Korean basketball player for the Los Angeles Sparks of the Women's National Basketball Association (WNBA). She previously played for the Bankstown Bruins of the NBL1 East, and the Asan Woori Bank Wibee of the Women's Korean Basketball League (WKBL). Park also plays for the South Korean national team.

== Early life ==
Park's interest in sports began from an early age and she started playing basketball in elementary school with her older brother. As a student at Soongeui Girls' High School, she stood out for her versatility, earning a call-up to the senior national team for the 2018 Asian Games. She was the first Korean female basketball player to receive an invitation to the "Basketball Without Borders" Global Camp in 2018 and was one of the All-Stars.

== Professional career ==
=== WKBL ===
In 2018, Park was drafted first overall in the first round of the WKBL draft and began her professional career with the Asan Woori Bank Wibee for the 2018-19 season. In 2019, she won the WKBL Rookie Award for the 2018-19 season.

During the 2020-21 season, she averaged 15.4 points, 10.4 rebounds, 3 assists, 1.7 steals, 1.2 blocks per game and was named to the WKBL League Best 5.

=== NBL1 ===
In May 2024, Park signed with the Bankstown Bruins of the NBL1 East. She was contracted with the Bruins until August 2024.

=== WNBA ===
Park went undrafted in the 2020 WNBA draft.

On 14 April 2026, it was announced that Park had signed a training camp contract with the Los Angeles Sparks of the Women's National Basketball Association (WNBA).

== National team career ==
=== Youth teams ===
Park represented South Korea at the 2016 FIBA Under-17 World Championship for Women in Spain. In six games, she led the tournament with 16.5 points per game and also averaged 7.7 rebounds, 2.8 assists, 3.3 steals and 0.7 blocks per game. In a game against the United States, Park recorded 17 points, 10 rebounds, 2 assists, 3 steals in a matchup against Charli Collier, the first overall pick in the 2021 WNBA Draft.

Park also played at the 2017 FIBA Under-19 Women’s Basketball World Cup in Italy and led the team in points (15.1), rebounds (5.6), assists (3.3) and steals (3.3).

At the 2019 FIBA Under-19 Women’s Basketball World Cup in Bangkok, Thailand, Park led the tournament with 16.4 points per game and 3.9 steals per game. Park posted 26 points, 7 rebounds, 4 steals and 1 block in a loss against the United States (highlights) and future WNBA prospects Paige Bueckers, Ashley Joens, and Aliyah Boston. After the game, U.S. coach Jeff Walz commented "She’s talented, she really put it to us in our game. We had a really hard time defending her. She scored behind the three-point line, she drove and hit the pull-up jump shot. She’s a very good basketball player."

=== Senior team ===
Park made her debut with the senior national team, at the 2018 Jakarta-Palembang Asian Games and also participated at the 2018 FIBA Women’s Basketball World Cup.

Park represented South Korea in the 2020 Tokyo Olympics and averaged 8.3 points, 4 rebounds, and 2 assists. On August 1, 2021, she recorded 17 points, 7 rebounds, 5 assists and a steal versus Serbia.

== Personal life ==
Park has an older brother Park Ji-won, who is also a professional basketball player. He played college basketball for Yonsei University and was drafted by Suwon KT Sonicboom in 2020.

She is represented by Gervin Global Management, a sports and entertainment management company founded by George "The Iceman" Gervin, Jerald Barisano and Robert Koo.

== Career statistics ==
Legend
GP	Games played	GS	Games started	MPG	Minutes per game	RPG	Rebounds per game
APG	Assists per game	SPG	Steals per game	BPG	Blocks per game	PPG	Points per game
TO	Turnovers per game	FG%	Field-goal percentage	3P%	3-point field-goal percentage	FT%	Free-throw percentage
**Bold**	Career best	°	League leader

=== WNBA ===
WNBA regular season statistics
Year	Team	GP	GS	MPG	FG%	3P%	FT%	RPG	APG	SPG	BPG	TO	PPG
2026	Los Angeles	36	0	9.2	.408	.257	.565	1.0	.6	.4	.0	.3	2.2
**Career**	1 year, 1 team	36	0	9.2	.408	.257	.565	1.0	.6	.4	.0	.3	2.2
