= Faezeh Shahriari =

Iranian basketball player (born 1994)

No. 77 – Chemidor Qom
- Position: Shooting guard
- League: Iranian Basketball Super League

Personal information
- Born: 28 October 1994 (age 32) Tehran, Iran
- Listed height: 5 ft 9 in (1.75 m)
- Listed weight: 144 lb (65 kg)

Career information
- Playing career: 2007–present

Career history
- 2007: Rah Ahan Tehran
- 2015 - 2016 - 2018: Koosha Sepehr Sabalan
- 2017: Nader chimi Qom
- 2019 - 2020: Palayesh Naft Abadan
- 2021 - 2022: Chemidor Qom

Career highlights
- Runner-up in Iranian Women's Basketball League with Koosha Sepehr Sabalan team - 2015; Champion in Iranian Women's Basketball League with Koosha Sepehr Sabalan team - 2016; Runner-up in Iranian Women's Basketball Division 2 with Qom Nader Chemistry Team 2017; Attending West Asian Clubs Basketball Championship with Koosha Sepehr Sabalanteam 2018; Fourth place Iranian Women's Basketball League with Palayesh Naft Abadan BC 2020; Champion in Iranian Women's Basketball League with Chemidor Qom team - 2022
Medals
Women's basketball
Representing Iran
FISU
Bronze medal – third place	2019 China	Team
WABA Championship
Bronze medal – third place	2018 Jordan	Team
Asian Cup
Silver medal – second place	2023 Thailand	Team

Faezeh Shahriari (born October 28, 1994) is an Iranian basketball player. She plays in the shooting guard position and she is bronze medal holder of the 2019 FISU in China.

== Biography ==
Faezeh Shahriari started playing basketball at the age of 11 with the encouragement of her mother and under the supervision of Sepideh Khoshgadam. At the age of 13, she joined the Rah'ahan Premier League team and a year later at the age of 14 she joined the national youth team. Shahriari has played for the Rah'ahan, Koosha Sepehr Sabalan, Nader Shimi Qom, Naft abadan and Chimidor Qom clubs. Also, her younger brother Ali Shahriari is a member of the Iranian national youth basketball team and one of the good players of the Mahram Tehran team.

== Achievements ==
Year	Competition	Venue	Rank	Event
2019	FISU	China	3rd	Basketball 3*3
2018	Women West Asian Championship	Jordan	3rd	Basketball

== See also ==
- Iranian Women's Basketball League 2015 (in Persian)
- Iranian Women's Basketball League 2016 (in Persian)
- Iranian Women's Basketball League 2019 (in Persian)
- International University Sports Federation
- Iran women's national basketball team
- Islamic Republic of Iran Basketball Federation
- Iranian Basketball Super League
