= Henan Phoenix =

Chinese professional women's basketball club

- League: Women's Chinese Basketball Association
- History: Henan Elephants (2002–14); Henan Phoenix (2014–present)
- Arena: Luoyang Stadium (since 2014)
- Capacity: 6000
- Location: Luoyang, Henan (since 2014)
- Affiliation: Yichuan Rural Commercial Bank

Henan Phoenix is a Chinese professional women's basketball club based in Henan, playing in the Women's Chinese Basketball Association (WCBA). Before 2014 it was known as Henan Elephants. The team is sometimes known by the name of its sponsor Yichuan Rural Commercial Bank (a bank based in Yichuan County, Henan).

== Season-by-season records ==
Season	Corporate Sponsor	Home City	Final Rank	Record (including playoffs)			Head coach
Season	Corporate Sponsor	Home City	Final Rank	W	L	%	Head coach
Henan Elephants
2002–03	Henan Baiquanchun Wine	Zhengzhou	10th	7	13	35.0	(China) Bai Yusheng; (China) Wang Zongxing
2004	Henan Yuguang Gold & Lead	Lingbao	7th	4	6	40.0	(China) Wang Zongxing
2004–05	Henan Yuguang Gold & Lead	Jiyuan	9th	7	9	43.8	(China) Li Jianxin
2005–06	Henan Yuguang Gold & Lead	Jiyuan	9th	8	14	36.4	(China) Liu Keming
2007	Henan Yuguang Gold & Lead	Jiyuan	6th	5	7	41.7	(China) Li Jianxin
2007–08	Henan Yuguang Gold & Lead	Jiyuan	8th	7	11	38.9	(China) Li Jianxin
2008–09	Henan Yuguang Gold & Lead	Jiyuan	5th	13	11	54.2	(China) Li Jianxin
2009–10	Henan Yuguang Gold & Lead	Jiyuan	2nd	23	8	74.2	(China) Li Jianxin
2010–11	Henan Yuguang Gold & Lead	Jiyuan	9th	8	14	36.4	(China) Li Jianxin
2011–12	Henan Yuguang Gold & Lead	Jiyuan	12th	1	21	4.6	(China) Li Jianxin
2012–13	Henan Yuguang Gold & Lead	Jiyuan	11th	6	16	27.3	(China) Li Jianxin
2013–14	Did not qualify / participate						
Henan Phoenix
2014–15	Yichuan Rural Commercial Bank	Luoyang	9th	7	15	31.8	(China) Wang Xiaomei
2015–16	Yichuan Rural Commercial Bank	Luoyang	9th	17	17	50.0	(China) Wang Xiaomei
2016–17	Yichuan Rural Commercial Bank	Luoyang	7th	12	22	35.3	(South Korea) Park Myung-soo
2017–18	Did not qualify / participate						
2018–19	Yichuan Rural Commercial Bank	Luoyang	10th	16	18	47.1	(Chinese Taipei) Wang Wei-chieh

== Current players ==
2018–19 Henan Phoenix roster
Players
Coaches

Pos.	No.	Nat.	Name	Ht.	Wt.
PG	3	(Chinese Taipei)	Huang Ying-li	1.70 m (5 ft 7 in)	60 kg (132 lb)
G	4	(China)	Hu Yuqi	1.78 m (5 ft 10 in)	58 kg (128 lb)
F	5	(China)	Sun Jie	1.84 m (6 ft 0 in)	80 kg (176 lb)
PG	7	(China)	Feng Song	1.73 m (5 ft 8 in)	60 kg (132 lb)
SF	8	(China)	Zheng Yaping	1.80 m (5 ft 11 in)	70 kg (154 lb)
PF	10	(China)	Zhang Ru	1.90 m (6 ft 3 in)	70 kg (154 lb)
PF	13	(China)	Tian Ying	1.92 m (6 ft 4 in)	75 kg (165 lb)
C	14	(China)	Cheng Qi	1.91 m (6 ft 3 in)	90 kg (198 lb)
F	15	(China)	Wu Di	1.90 m (6 ft 3 in)	68 kg (150 lb)
PF	21	(China)	Zhang Lingge	1.91 m (6 ft 3 in)	75 kg (165 lb)
SG	24	(China)	Zhang Xianyuan	1.80 m (5 ft 11 in)	65 kg (143 lb)
C	31	(United States)	Stefanie Dolson	1.95 m (6 ft 5 in)	85 kg (187 lb)
SF	47	(Chinese Taipei)	Wei Yu-chun	1.74 m (5 ft 9 in)	64 kg (141 lb)

Head coach

- (Chinese Taipei) Wang Wei-chieh

Assistant coach(es)

- (China) Wang Jing

Legend

- (C) Team captain
- Injured

== Notable former players ==
- (United States) Jenny Mowe (2002–03)
- (United States) Tausha Mills (2004–05)
- (United States) Yolanda Griffith (2008–09)
- (United States) Katie Mattera (2009–11)
- (United States) Gabrielle Rosigi
- (United States) Dominic Seals (2011–12)
- (United States) Jayne Appel (2012–13)
- (United States) Tianna Hawkins (2014–15)
- (United States) Cheyenne Parker (2015–16)
- (United States) Chiney Ogwumike (2016–17)
- (Chinese Taipei) Huang Ping-jen (2015–17)
- (China) Ji Yanyan (2008–10)
- (China) Chen Xiaoli (2014–17)
