= Jin An =

Taiwanese-South Korean basketball player (born 1996)

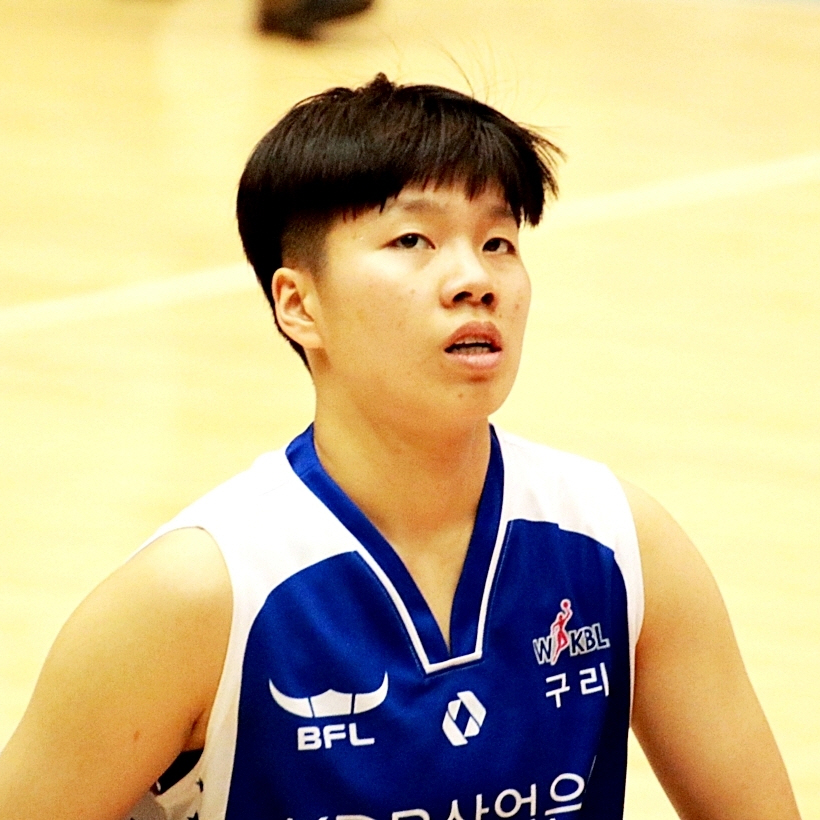

Busan BNK Sum
- League: Women's Korean Basketball League

Personal information
- Born: 23 March 1996 (age 30) Yilan, Taiwan
- Listed height: 6 ft 0 in (1.83 m)

Career history
- 2015–present: Busan BNK Sum

Jin An (born 23 March 1996) is a Taiwanese-South Korean basketball player. She is part of the South Korean team in the women's tournament at the 2020 Summer Olympics.
