= Bucheon Hana Bank =

South Korean women's basketball team

- League: Women's Korean Basketball League
- Founded: 2012; 14 years ago
- History: Bucheon Hana Exchange; 2012–2015; Bucheon KEB Hana Bank; 2015–2020; Bucheon Hana Bank; 2020; Bucheon Hana 1Q; 2020–2024; Bucheon Hana Bank; 2024–present
- Arena: Bucheon Gymnasium
- Capacity: 5,403
- Location: Bucheon, South Korea
- Head coach: Lee Sang-beom
- Team captain: Jung Ye-rim
- Ownership: Lee Ho-seoung
- Affiliation: Hana Bank
- Website: hanafnbasketball.com
Home	Away

Bucheon Hana Bank (Korean: 부천 하나은행) is a South Korean women's professional basketball club based in Bucheon. They play in the Women's Korean Basketball League.
