= Park Ji-su =

South Korean female basketball player (born 1998)

Park Ji-su 박지수
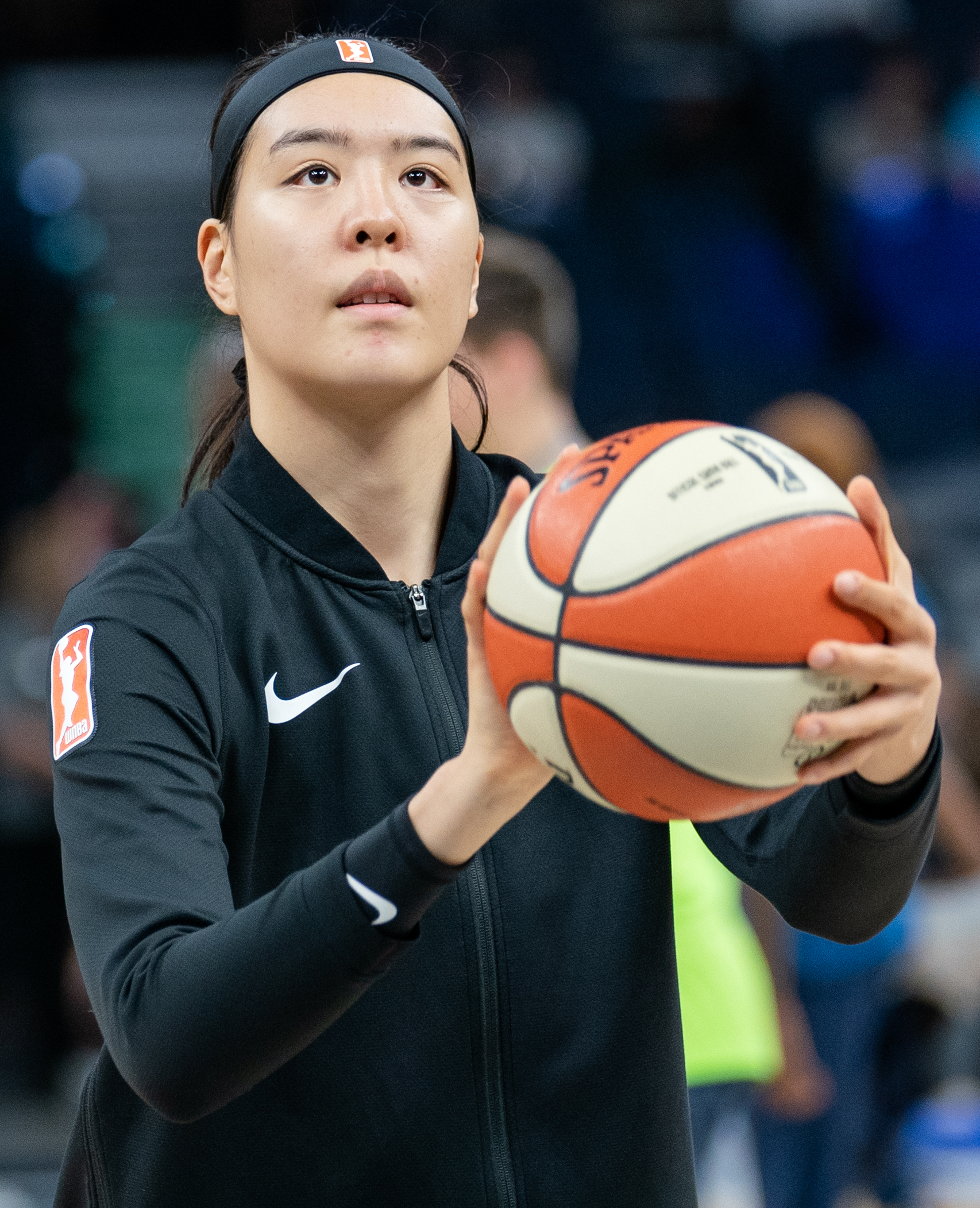
- Ji-Su Park in 2019

Cheongju KB Stars
- Position: Center

Personal information
- Born: 6 December 1998 (age 27) Seongnam, South Korea
- Listed height: 6 ft 4 in (1.93 m)
- Listed weight: 206 lb (93 kg)

Career information
- High school: Bundang (Seongnam, Gyeonggi)
- WNBA draft: 2018: 2nd round, 17th overall pick
- Drafted by: Minnesota Lynx
- Playing career: 2016–present

Career history
- 2016–2024: Cheongju KB Stars
- 2018–2021: Las Vegas Aces
- 2024–2025: Galatasaray
- 2025–present: Cheongju KB Stars

Career highlights
- WKBL Top 5 Regular League MVPs of All Time; WKBL Top 5 Most Round MVPs of All Time; 3× WKBL Top Scorer (2021,2022,2024); 2× WKBL All Star MVP (2020,2024); 4× WKBL Regular League MVP (2019,2021,2022,2024); 2× WKBL Championship MVP (2019,2022); WKBL All Star Best Performance Award (2019); 2× WKBL Champion (2019,2022); 6× WKBL Best 5 (2018-2022,2024); 5× WKBL Defensive Player of the Year (2018-2020,2022,2024); 6× WKBL Rebounding Leader (2018-2022,2024); 5× WKBL Blocks Leader (2018-2021,2024); 5× WKBL The Yoon Duk-joo Award (2018,2019,2021,2022,2024); WKBL Newcomer (2017)
- Stats at Basketball Reference
Medals
Women's basketball
Representing South Korea
FIBA Asia Cup
Bronze medal – third place	2015 China
Asian Games
Bronze medal – third place	2022 Hangzhou	Team
Representing Korea
Asian Games
Silver medal – second place	2018 Jakarta	Team

Park Ji-su (Korean: 박지수; born 6 December 1998) is a South Korean female professional basketball player for the Cheongju KB Stars of the Women's Korean Basketball League (WKBL).

== Career ==
=== National team ===
==== Youth level ====
Park made her international debut 2012 FIBA Under-17 World Championship in the Netherlands, at age 13. Alongside this, Park participated at the 2014 U-17 World Championship in the Czech Republic, as well as the 2013 and 2015 U-19 World Championships in Lithuania and Russia respectively. Park had a prolific youth career at international tournaments, participating in seven FIBA events, across five years. This was highlighted by two bronze medals at FIBA Asia youth events.

==== Senior level ====
Park made her debut with the senior national team, at the 2014 FIBA World Championship for Women in Turkey when she was 15 years old. Park averaged 11 points and 5 five rebounds per game in her senior debut.

=== WKBL ===
In 2016, Park began her professional career with the Cheongju KB Stars for the 2016–17 season. In 2017, Park received the WKBL Newcomer Award for the 2016–17 season.

=== WNBA ===
In 2018, Park Ji-su was drafted as the seventeenth overall pick by the Minnesota Lynx. After being released by the Lynx, Park was then picked up by the Las Vegas Aces, where she made the final roster and her WNBA debut aged 19.

In May 2020, the Aces announced that Park would sit out the 2020 season to train in South Korea.

=== Overseas ===
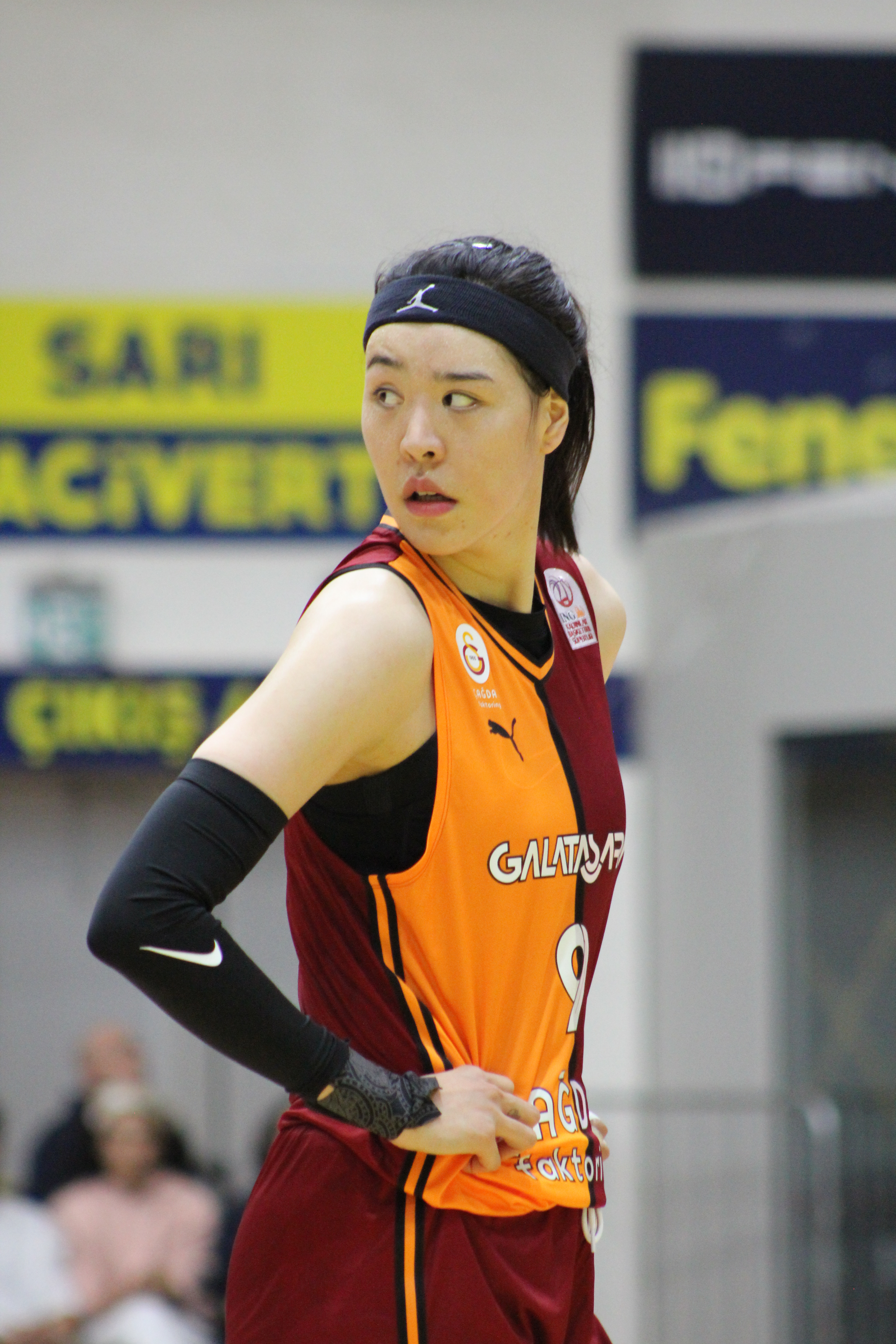
Park with the Galatasaray in 2025

On July 20, 2024, she signed with Galatasaray of the Turkish Women's Basketball Super League (TKBL).

== Career statistics ==
Legend
GP	Games played	GS	Games started	MPG	Minutes per game	RPG	Rebounds per game
APG	Assists per game	SPG	Steals per game	BPG	Blocks per game	PPG	Points per game
TO	Turnovers per game	FG%	Field-goal percentage	3P%	3-point field-goal percentage	FT%	Free-throw percentage
**Bold**	Career best	°	League leader

=== WNBA ===
==== Regular season ====
Year	Team	GP	GS	MPG	FG%	3P%	FT%	RPG	APG	SPG	BPG	TO	PPG
2018	Las Vegas	**32**	**11**	**13.0**	**.388**	.000	.619	**3.3**	**0.9**	**0.3**	**0.6**	0.7	**2.8**
2019	Las Vegas	25	0	6.5	.216	.000	.444	1.1	0.4	0.2	0.2	**0.3**	0.8
2021	Las Vegas	25	0	8.9	.327	.000	**.833**	1.8	0.8	0.1	**0.6**	0.8	2.0
Career		82	11	9.8	.337	.000	.667	2.2	0.7	0.2	0.5	0.6	1.9

==== Playoffs ====
Year	Team	GP	GS	MPG	FG%	3P%	FT%	RPG	APG	SPG	BPG	TO	PPG
2019	Las Vegas	3	0	**4.7**	**.200**	–	–	**0.7**	0.0	0.0	0.0	**0.0**	**0.7**
2021	Las Vegas	**4**	0	4.0	.000	–	.000	0.3	0.0	0.0	0.0	0.3	0.0
Career		7	0	4.3	.125	–	.000	0.4	0.0	0.0	0.0	0.1	0.3
