= Jeong Hyo-geun =

South Korean basketball player

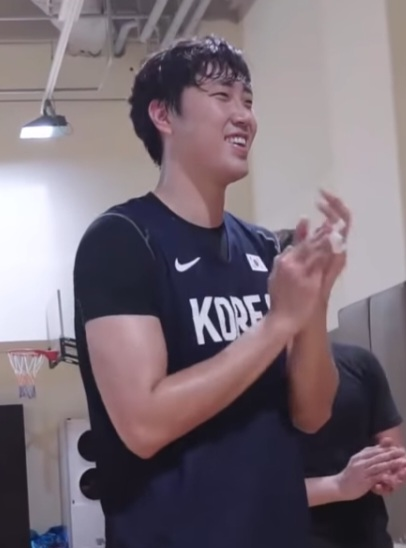
- Jeong in 2019

No. 12 – Wonju DB Promy
- Position: Power forward
- League: Korean Basketball League

Personal information
- Born: December 14, 1993 (age 32) Seoul, South Korea
- Listed height: 6 ft 7 in (2.01 m)
- Listed weight: 205 lb (93 kg)

Career information
- College: Hanyang University
- KBL draft: 2014: 1st round, 3rd overall pick
- Playing career: 2014–present

Career history
- 2014–2023: Incheon Electroland Elephants / Daegu KOGAS Pegasus
- 2019–2021: → Sangmu (loan)
- 2023–2025: Anyang KGC–Jung Kwan Jang Red Boosters
- 2025–present: Wonju DB Promy

- Korean name
- Hangul: 정효근
- Hanja: 鄭效根
- RR: Jeong Hyogeun
- MR: Chŏng Hyogŭn

Jeong Hyo-geun (born December 14, 1993) is a South Korean professional basketball player for the Korean Basketball League side Wonju DB Promy and the South Korean national team.

== Early life ==
Jeong attended Daekyung Information Industrial High School in Seoul. As a high school student, he was already over 190 cm tall. Most of his peers of similar height were converted into forwards or centers after their growth spurt while the shorter students were assigned to the guard positions, but he played as a guard from elementary school all the way until high school.

== College career ==
At Hanyang University, Jeong was moved to the center position by his coach in order to better utilize his height. He eventually became the team's "center-forward" swingman. During his junior season, he was Hanyang's top scorer with an average of 19.8 points in the U-League (ranking second overall).

== Professional career ==
Jeong was the third overall pick of the 2014 KBL rookie draft, and was drafted by the Incheon Electroland Elephants. He was one of the few players in the draft who was not a senior, having chosen to declare early instead. During his rookie season he averaged 5.05 points, 2.48 rebounds and 0.83 assists. He switched position again, this time to forward, at the suggestion of his manager Yoo Do-hoon.

In the 2015–16 season, he averaged 6.78 points, 4.8 rebounds and 0.8 assists. In his 3rd season there, he averaged 8.18 points, 4.54 rebounds and 1.46 assists.

In the 2017–18 season, he averaged 8.51 points 3.88 rebounds and 1.98 assists. The Elephants finished participated in the Summer Super 8 and Jeong, who had been left out of the national team, took advantage of the absence of key players. He scored 13 points, 6 rebounds and 2 blocks in the third-place match.

In the 2018–19 season, Jeong formed a partnership with Kang Sang-jae and the duo were among the key players in the team's record-breaking season. The Elephants finished runners-up in the league table and made it to the finals of the play-offs, their best ever season result in franchise history. Jeong averaged 10.77 points, 4.85 rebounds and 2.58 assists. He was voted into the KBL All-Star for the first time. His good form that season earned him a recall to the national team.

In June 2019, Jeong was enlisted for mandatory military service and assigned to the Sangmu team after completing basic training. He was discharged in January 2021 and immediately rejoined his team for the remainder of the 2020–21 season.

=== National team ===
Jeong has mostly been a reserve player for the South Korean national team behind the likes of Yang Hee-jong, Lim Dong-seob, and Kang Sang-jae in the depth chart. Despite his good form in 2018, he was left out of the squads for the William Jones Cup and Asian Games. He made the final tournament squad for the 2019 FIBA Basketball World Cup where he averaged 3 points, 2.3 rebounds and 0.3 assist at the tournament.
