= Myeongsin Girl's High School =

Private school in South Korea

- Hangul: 명신여자고등학교
- Hanja: 明新女子高等學校
- RR: Myeongsin yeoja godeunghakgyo
- MR: Myŏngsin yŏja kodŭnghakkyo

Myeongsin Girl's High School (Korean: 명신여자고등학교) is a private girls' school located in Sangok-dong, Bupyeong-gu, Incheon, South Korea.

== History ==
It was accredited as a school on 6 July 1970, and officially opened on 4 March 1971.
