= Trinity Baptiste =

American basketball player

Personal information
- Born: June 15, 1998 (age 28) Tampa, Florida, U.S.
- Listed height: 6 ft 0 in (1.83 m)
- Listed weight: 160 lb (73 kg)

Career information
- High school: Hillsborough (Tampa, Florida)
- College: Northwest Florida State (2017–2018); Virginia Tech (2018–2020); Arizona (2020–2021)
- WNBA draft: 2021: 2nd round, 24th overall pick
- Drafted by: Indiana Fever
- Playing career: 2021–present
- Position: Forward

Career history
- 2021–2022: Politeh-SamGTU Samara
- 2022: Club Félix Pérez Cardozo
- 2022: Mainland Pouakai
- 2022–2023: FCC UAV Arad
- 2023: Plateros de Fresnillo
- 2023–2024: Bursa Uludağ BK
- 2024: Sampaio
- 2024–: Maccabi Haifa

Career highlights
- ACC Sixth Player of the Year (2020)
- Stats at Basketball Reference

Trinity Baptiste (born June 15, 1998) is an American professional basketball player. She was drafted in the second round by the Indiana Fever in the 2021 WNBA draft but was waived by the team before the start of the season.

== College career ==
Baptiste grew up in Tampa, Florida. She attended Hillsborough High School. She was nominated as a McDonald's All-American in 2016.

Baptiste started her college career at Northwest Florida State College. She appeared in 31 games and averaged 13 points per game on a 61% field goal percentage. She also averaged 8.3 rebounds.

She transferred to Virginia Tech for her sophomore season. She appeared in 64 games for the Hokies and started 26. At Virginia Tech, she recorded 12 double-doubles. She was named ACC Sixth Player of the Year in 2020 and was named to the ACC All-Academic Team.

Baptiste joined the University of Arizona as a graduate transfer after the 2020 season. She started all 27 games at Arizona, where she averaged 26.4 minutes, 8.6 points, and 6.1 rebounds. Baptiste lead Arizona to an appearance in the championship game in the 2021 NCAA Division 1 Women's Basketball tournament.

Baptiste decided to forgo her remaining eligibility, of which she had an extra year due to the coronavirus pandemic, and declare for the WNBA draft in spring 2021.

== Club career ==
Baptiste joined Russian club Politeh-SamGTU Samara in 2021. Following the Russian invasion of Ukraine, she left the country and later played for Club Félix Pérez Cardozo in Paraguay, where she won the South American Women's Basketball League, and Mainland Pouakai in New Zealand in 2022, before joining Romanian club FCC UAV Arad later that year.

She later represented Plateros de Fresnillo in Mexico and Turkish side Bursa Uludağ BK. In 2024, she played for Brazilian club Sampaio before joining Israeli side Maccabi Haifa.

== International career ==
Baptiste represented Lebanon at the 2023 FIBA Women's Asia Cup in Sydney, Australia. She helped the Lebanese team finish seventh after beating Chinese Taipei, and remain in Division A for 2025.

== Career statistics ==
Legend
GP	Games played	GS	Games started	MPG	Minutes per game	RPG	Rebounds per game
APG	Assists per game	SPG	Steals per game	BPG	Blocks per game	PPG	Points per game
TO	Turnovers per game	FG%	Field-goal percentage	3P%	3-point field-goal percentage	FT%	Free-throw percentage
**Bold**	Career best	°	League leader

=== College ===
Year	Team	GP	GS	MPG	FG%	3P%	FT%	RPG	APG	SPG	BPG	TO	PPG
2018–19	Virginia Tech	**34**	19	**27.5**	**49.6**	**55.3**	**85.6**	**7.6**	**1.5**	0.8	0.2	2.1	**10.4**
2019–20	Virginia Tech	30	7	22.9	43.8	37.3	84.8	6.4	1.0	0.5	0.2	1.8	9.5
2020–21	Arizona	27	**27**	26.3	44.0	34.8	83.8	6.1	1.0	**0.9**	0.2	**1.6**	8.6
**Career**		91	53	25.6	45.9	41.5	85.0	6.7	1.2	0.7	0.2	1.9	9.6
Statistics retrieved from Sports-Reference.
