= Iran women's national basketball team =

Iran
- FIBA ranking: 28
- Joined FIBA: 1947
- FIBA zone: FIBA Asia
- National federation: I.R.I.B.F.
- Coach: Eleni Kapogianni

Olympic Games
- Appearances: None

World Cup
- Appearances: None

Asia Cup
- Appearances: 4
- Medals: Runners-up (Division B)
Home	Away

The Iran women's national basketball team is the women's basketball side that represents Iran in international competitions.

== Tournament records ==
=== Asian Cup for Women ===
Year	FIBA Women's Asia Cup						
Year	Rank	M	W	L	PF	PA	PD
(South Korea) 1965 to (Taiwan) 1972	Did not enter						
(South Korea) 1974	4th Place	6	2	4	303	467	-164
(Hong Kong) 1976 to (India) 2019	Did not enter						
(Jordan) 2021	14th (6th in Level II)	4	0	4	261	283	-22
(Australia) 2023	10th (2nd in Level II)	6	4	2	371	307	+64
(China) 2025	10th (2nd in Level II)	5	4	1	384	275	+109
Total	4/31	21	10	11	1,319	1,332	-13

=== Asian Games ===
Year	Rank	M	W	L	PF	PA	PD
(Iran) 1974	4th Place	4	0	4	163	347	−184
(Thailand) 1978 to (Japan) 2026	Did not enter						
Total	1/12	4	0	4	163	347	−184

1. IRI 24-89 JPN
2. IRI 36-95 JPN
3. IRI 60-89 JPN
4. IRI 43-74 KOR

=== West Asian Championship for Women ===
Year	Rank	Pld	W	L
(Syria) 2008	4th Place	5	2	3
(Jordan) 2019	3rd Place	4	2	2
(Jordan) 2025	1st Place	2	2	0
Total	3/3	11	6	5

==== 2008 ====
1. IRI 0-0 JOR
2. IRI 0-0 LBN
3. IRI 0-0 SYR
4. IRI 108-44 IRQ
5. IRI 70-78 SYR B

==== 2019 ====
https://iranpress.com/content/13502/iran-shines-west-asia-championship-women-basketball

1. IRI 70-62 JOR
2. IRI 75-88 LBN
3. IRI 61-68 SYR
4. IRI 71-52 JOR

==== 2025 ====
1. IRI 66-55 SYR
2. IRI 88-70 JOR

=== William Jones Cup ===
2023 William Jones Cup - 6th

=== Women's Islamic Games ===
2001 Women's Islamic Games

2005 Women's Islamic Games

=== Malaysia Friendly ===
2007 Friendly - 3rd
