= Jhazmin Joson =

Filipino basketball player

No. 23 – Southern Tigers
- Position: Guard
- League: NBL1 Central

Personal information
- Born: August 15, 1999 (age 27)
- Listed height: 5 ft 7 in (1.70 m)

Career information
- College: Ateneo
- Playing career: 2024–present

Career history
- 2024: Goldfields Giants
- 2025: Joondalup Wolves
- 2026–: Southern Tigers

Jhazmin Joson (born August 15, 1999) is a Filipino basketball player who plays for the Southern Tigers of NBL1 Central of Australia.

== Early life and education ==
Jhazmin Joson was born on August 15, 1999. At eight years old, her family moved to Los Angeles in the United States. She began playing basketball and attended the Ribet Academy. She played high school basketball in the U.S.. She returned to the Philippines to study at the Ateneo de Manila University.

== Career ==
=== College ===
Joson played for the Ateneo Blue Eagles in the University Athletic Association of the Philippines (UAAP). She made her debut in late 2017 during UAAP Season 80. Her stint was distrupted by the COVID-19 pandemic with Season 83 in 2020 being cancelled.

Women's basketball returned in the UAAP in Season 85 in 2022. Joson was named captain of the team. The team reached the Final Four. Her last season with Ateneo was in Season 86 in 2023.

=== Club ===
In April 2024, Joson joined the Goldfields Giants of the NBL1 West in Australia. In March 2025, she moved to the Joondalup Wolves. And in 2026, Joson has joined the Southern Tigers of NBL1 Central.

=== National team ===
Joson has been part of the Philippines women's national team, debuting at the 2023 FIBA Women's Asia Cup in Australia. She received an invite as early as late 2022. She played at the 2026 Asian Games in Aichi and Nagoya, Japan.

Joson has also played for Philippines women's national 3x3 team. She participated at the 2024 FIBA 3x3 Asia Cup in Singapore and the 2025 SEA Games in Thailand.
