= Samsung Life Blueminx =

Yongin Samsung Life Blueminx 용인 삼성생명 블루밍스
- League: Women's Korean Basketball League
- Founded: 1977; 49 years ago
- History: Samsung Women's Basketball Club; 1977–1982; Dongbang Life Basketball Club; 1982–1997; Suwon Samsung Life Bichumi; 1998–2005; Yongin Samsung Life Bichumi; 2005–2012; Yongin Samsung Life Blueminx; 2012–2014, 2015–present Yongin Samsung Blueminx; 2014–2015
- Arena: Yongin Gymnasium
- Capacity: 1,795
- Location: Yongin, South Korea
- Team colors: Blue, white
- Head coach: Ha Sang-yoon
- Ownership: Kim Jong-hyun
- Affiliation: Cheil Worldwide
- Championships: 6 Korean Leagues
- Retired numbers: 2 (5, 11)
- Website: samsungblueminx.com
Home	Away

Yongin Samsung Life Blueminx (Korean: 용인 삼성생명 블루밍스) is a South Korean women's professional basketball club based in Yongin. They have been a member of the WKBL (Women's Korean Basketball League) since its inception. Originally based in Suwon, they are now located in Yongin, Gyeonggi-do.

== Honours ==
- WKBL Championship

Winners (6): 1998 (summer), 1999 (summer), 2000 (winter), 2001 (winter), 2006 (summer), 2020–21
Runners-up (13): 2002 (summer), 2003 (winter), 2003 (summer), 2004 (winter), 2005 (winter), 2007 (winter), 2007–08, 2008–09, 2009–10, 2012–13, 2016–17, 2018–19, 2025–26

- WKBL Regular Season

Winners (6): 1998 (summer), 1999 (summer), 2000 (winter), 2002 (summer), 2003 (summer), 2004 (winter)
