= Zhang Ru =

Chinese basketball player (born 1999)

No. 10 – Shanxi Flame
- Position: Forward
- League: WCBA

Personal information
- Born: 2 September 1999 (age 27) Jiaozuo, Henan
- Listed height: 1.85 m (6 ft 1 in)

Career information
- Playing career: 2018–present

Career history
- 2018–2021: Henan Phoenix
- 2021–2025: Inner Mongolia Rural Credit Union
- 2025–present: Shanxi Flame
Medals
Women's basketball
Representing China
World Cup
Silver medal – second place	2022 Australia
Asia Cup
Gold medal – first place	2023 Australia
Silver medal – second place	2021 Jordan
Bronze medal – third place	2025 China
Asian Games
Gold medal – first place	2022 Hangzhou	Team

Zhang Ru (Chinese: 张茹; pinyin: Zhāng Rú; born September 2, 1999) is a professional Chinese basketball player. She plays for the Shanxi Flame of the Women's Chinese Basketball Association (WCBA).

From 2018, Ru started participating in the WCBA league. She played for the Henan Women then she joined the Inner Mongolia Women. In the 2021–2022 season, Ru helped her team win the Champion, and she was elected for the All-Star lineup of that season.

For her career in the national team, Zhang Ru represented the Chinese women's basketball team and participated in various events, including the 2020 Tokyo Olympics, the 2021 FIBA Women's Asia Cup, and the 2022 FIBA Women's World Cup.

== Life ==
Zhang Ru was born in 1999 in Jiaozuo, Henan Province.

She is a sports training graduate from the School of Physical Education at Zhengzhou University.

Zhang started playing basketball during some holidays when she was 12 years old. She would be called up to play for the national team at the age of 20.

She joined the Henan Women's Basketball Team in 2018, which debuted in the WCBA. She would join the Inner Mongolia Women's Basketball Team afterwards.

== Professional career ==
=== Henan(2018-2021) ===
On October 20, 2018, the Henan women's basketball team defeated the Fujian women's basketball team with a score of 96–71. Zhang Ru played for 5 minutes and grabbed 1 rebound, marking her first appearance in her WCBA career. During the 2018–19 season, Ru represented the Henan women's basketball team in 27 regular-season games, averaging 13.2 minutes per game. She scored an average of 3.0 points, grabbed 1.8 rebounds, and recorded 0.3 assists.

During the 2019–20 season, Zhang Ru represented the Henan women's basketball team in 18 regular-season games, averaging 30.0 minutes per game. She averaged 12.3 points, 5.7 rebounds, and 1.9 assists.

During the 2020–21 season, Zhang Ru represented the Henan women's basketball team in 16 regular-season games, averaging 31.6 minutes per game. She averaged 15.8 points, 5.6 rebounds, and 2.3 assists in those games. Additionally, she played in one playoff game, where she played for 40 minutes and scored 33 points while also contributing 5 rebounds and 2 assists.

=== Inner Mongolia ===
On November 15, 2021, the Inner Mongolia women's basketball team defeated the FUSC (Fujian University of Sports and Culture) team with a score of 97–47. Zhang Ru played for 25 minutes, scoring 16 points, grabbing 3 rebounds, providing 2 assists, and making 2 steals. This marked her debut in her personal career with the Inner Mongolia women's basketball team. On December 21, the WCBA (Women's Chinese Basketball Association) officially announced the roster for the 2021 WCBA All-Star Game, and Zhang Ru was selected to the North Team's All-Star roster. On December 21, the WCBA officially announced the roster for the 2021 WCBA All-Star Game, and Zhang Ru was selected to the North Team's All-Star roster.

During the 2021–22 season, Zhang Ru represented the Inner Mongolia women's basketball team in 17 regular-season games, averaging 22.5 minutes per game. She averaged 10.2 points, 2.9 rebounds, and 1.2 assists in those games. In the playoffs, she played in 4 games, averaging 25.5 minutes, and averaged 3.8 points, 2.3 rebounds, and 1.3 assists. On November 16, 2022, the Inner Mongolia women's basketball team renewed their contract with Ru.

=== National team ===
On October 3, 2021, Zhang Ru represented the Chinese women's basketball team in the final of the 2021 Women's Asia Cup. In the end, the Chinese women's basketball team lost to the Japanese women's basketball team with a score of 73–78, earning the runner-up position in the tournament.

On October 1, in the 2022 Women's Basketball World Cup final, Zhang Ru made her debut. In the end, the Chinese women's basketball team lost 61–83 to the US women's basketball team and won the runner-up.

On July 2, Zhang Ru helped the Chinese women's basketball team win the championship at the 2023 Women's Asia Cup.
