= Stella Beck =

New Zealand basketball player

No. 7 – Tokomanawa Queens
- Position: Guard
- League: Tauihi Basketball Aotearoa

Personal information
- Born: 25 September 1995 (age 31)
- Listed height: 6 ft 0 in (1.83 m)
- Listed weight: 159 lb (72 kg)

Career information
- High school: Hutt Valley (Lower Hutt, New Zealand)
- College: Saint Mary's (2014–2018)
- WNBA draft: 2018: undrafted
- Playing career: 2012–present

Career history
- 2012–2013: Hutt Valley Flyers
- 2014: Capital Flyers
- 2018: Townsville Flames
- 2018–2019: Townsville Fire
- 2019: Launceston Tornadoes
- 2019–2020: Melbourne Boomers
- 2021: Capital Swish
- 2022–present: Tokomanawa Queens

Career highlights
- TBA champion (2022); WBC champion (2013); 2× TBA Defensive Player of the Year (2024, 2025); WBC MVP (2013); WBC All-Star Five (2013); WBC Junior Player of the Year (2012); 2× First-team All-WCC (2017, 2018); Second-team All-WCC (2016); WCC Newcomer of the Year (2015); WCC All-Freshman Team (2015)
Medals
Representing New Zealand
Basketball
FIBA Oceania Championship
Silver medal – second place	2013 Australia / New Zealand	Team
Silver medal – second place	2015 Australia / New Zealand	Team

Stella Beck (born 25 September 1995) is a New Zealand professional basketball player.

== Early life ==
Raised in Eastbourne, Hutt Valley, Beck attended Hutt Valley High School in Lower Hutt.

== Career ==
=== Early years ===
In 2012, Beck debuted in New Zealand's Women's Basketball Championship (WBC) for the Hutt Valley Flyers, earning Junior Player of the Year. She was named WBC MVP in 2013 and led Hutt Valley to the championship. She continued in the WBC in 2014 for the Capital Flyers, helping them win the WBC plate final alongside Tegan Graham.

=== College ===
Beck played college basketball for the Saint Mary's Gaels between 2014 and 2018.

==== Saint Mary's statistics ====
Ratios
Year	Team	GP	FG%	3P%	FT%	RBG	APG	BPG	SPG	PPG
2014–15	Saint Mary's	33	55.0%	25.9%	56.4%	6.06	1.91	0.36	1.00	8.09
2015–16	Saint Mary's	28	55.9%	18.2%	72.0%	5.79	2.79	0.57	1.04	9.89
2016–17	Saint Mary's	31	54.6%	27.6%	73.2%	5.32	3.16	0.45	1.55	13.03
2017–18	Saint Mary's	31	59.9%	31.7%	73.2%	6.23	3.19	0.74	1.23	15.84
Career		123	56.6%	28.5%	69.6%	5.85	2.75	0.53	1.20	11.70

=== Professional ===
After a stint in the Queensland Basketball League for the Townsville Flames, Beck joined the Townsville Fire for the 2018–19 WNBL season. In 2019, she played for the Launceston Tornadoes in the NBL1 before joining the Melbourne Boomers for the 2019–20 WNBL season. She continued with the Boomers for the 2020 WNBL Hub season in Queensland.

In 2021, Beck returned to New Zealand and played for the Capital Swish in the Women's NBL. In 2022, she joined the Tokomanawa Queens and helped them win the inaugural Tauihi Basketball Aotearoa championship. She re-joined the Queens in 2023. With the Queens in 2024, she was named the Tauihi Basketball Aotearoa Defensive Player of the Year. She was named TBA Defensive Player of the Year for the second straight season in 2025.

=== National team ===
Beck made her international debut in 2011 at the FIBA Oceania Under-16 Championship. She played for New Zealand in 2012 at the FIBA Oceania U18 Championship and then made her senior debut in 2013 at the FIBA Oceania Championship. She continued to play for the Tall Ferns in 2015, 2016 and 2019.

== Personal life ==
Beck's father, Shawn, is a basketball coach. He was raised and educated in the United States.
