= Incheon Shinhan Bank S-Birds =

South Korean women's basketball team

Incheon Shinhan Bank S-Birds 인천 신한은행 에스버드
- League: Women's Korean Basketball League
- Founded: 1986; 40 years ago
- History: Hyundai Heavy Industries; 1986–1990; Hyundai Development Company; 1990–1999; Hyundai E&C Redfox; 2000–2001; Cheongju Hyundai Hyperion; 2001–2004; Ansan Shinhan Bank S-Birds; 2004–2014; Incheon Shinhan Bank S-Birds; 2014–present
- Arena: Dowon Gymnasium
- Capacity: 3,300
- Location: Incheon, South Korea
- Team colors: White, dark blue
- Head coach: Choi Yoon-ah
- Ownership: Jeong Sang-hyeok
- Affiliation: Shinhan Bank
- Championships: 8 Korean Leagues
- Website: sbirds.com
Home	Away

Incheon Shinhan Bank S-Birds (Korean: 인천 신한은행 에스버드) is a professional basketball club in the Women's Korean Basketball League in South Korea.

== Honours ==
- WKBL Championship

Winners (8): 2002 (summer), 2005 (summer), 2007 (winter), 2007–08, 2008–09, 2009–10, 2010–11, 2011–12
Runners-up (6): 1999 (summer), 2000 (winter), 2000 (summer), 2001 (summer), 2006 (winter), 2013–14

- WKBL Regular Season

Winners (6): 2007 (winter), 2007–08, 2008–09, 2009–10, 2010–11, 2011–12
Runners-up (9): 1999 (summer), 2000 (winter), 2000 (summer), 2001 (summer), 2002 (summer), 2006 (winter), 2012–13, 2013–14, 2014–15
