= Asan Woori Bank Woori Won =

South Korean women's basketball club

- League: Women's Korean Basketball League
- Founded: 1958; 68 years ago
- History: Chuncheon Hanbit Bank Hansae; 1998–2002; Chuncheon Woori Bank Hansae; 2002–2016; Asan Woori Bank Wibee; 2016–2021; Asan Woori Bank Woori Won; 2021–present
- Arena: Yi Sun-sin Gymnasium
- Capacity: 3,176
- Location: Asan, South Korea
- Head coach: Chun Joo-weon
- Ownership: Jung Jin-wan
- Affiliation: Woori Bank
- Championships: 13 Korean Leagues
- Website: wooriwon.wooribank.com

Asan Woori Bank Woori Won (Korean: 아산 우리은행 우리WON) is a South Korean professional basketball club based in Asan that competes in the Women's Korean Basketball League. They are the most successful club in the league with 13 championship titles.

== Honours ==
- WKBL Championship

Winners (13): 2003 (winter), 2003 (summer), 2005 (winter), 2006 (winter), 2012–13, 2013–14, 2014–15, 2015–16, 2016–17, 2017–18, 2019–20, (Note: The 2019–20 championship was not played due to the COVID-19 pandemic in South Korea. Woori Bank were declared champions on behalf of the regular season results.) 2022–23, 2023–24
Runners-up (5): 1999 (winter), 2001 (winter), 2005 (summer), 2021–22, 2024–25

- WKBL Regular Season

Winners (15): 1999 (winter), 2003 (winter), 2005 (winter), 2005 (summer), 2006 (winter), 2012–13, 2013–14, 2014–15, 2015–16, 2016–17, 2017–18, 2019–20, 2020–21, 2022–23, 2024–25
Runners-up (4): 2007 (winter), 2018–19, 2021–22, 2023–24
