= Busan BNK Sum =

South Korean women's basketball team

Busan BNK Sum 부산 BNK 썸
- League: Women's Korean Basketball League
- Founded: June 2019; 7 years ago
- Arena: Busan Sajik Gymnasium
- Capacity: 14,099
- Location: Busan, South Korea
- Head coach: Park Jung-eun
- Ownership: Kim Sung-joo
- Affiliation: BNK Busan Bank
- Championships: 1 Korean League
- Website: bnksumbasket.com
Home	Away

Busan BNK Sum (Korean: 부산 BNK 썸) is a South Korean professional basketball club playing in the Women's Korean Basketball League.

== Honours ==
- WKBL Championship

Winners (1): 2024–25
Runners-up (1): 2022–23

- WKBL Regular Season

Runners-up (2): 2022–23, 2024–25

- William Jones Cup

Runners-up (1): 2023
