= Women's Korean Basketball League =

South Korean professional women's basketball league

Women's Korean Basketball League (WKBL)
- WKBL Logo
- Sport: Basketball
- Founded: 1998; 28 years ago
- No. of teams: 6
- Country: South Korea
- Continent: FIBA Asia (Asia)
- Most recent champion: Cheongju KB Stars (3rd title) (2025–26)
- Most titles: Asan Woori Bank Woori Won (13 titles)
- Website: wkbl.or.kr

The Women's Korean Basketball League (WKBL) (Hangul: 한국여자프로농구) is the premier professional women's basketball league in South Korea. The league was established in 1998.

== Current clubs ==
Club	Home City	Founded	Championships
Asan Woori Bank Woori Won	Asan, Chungcheongnam-do	1958	13
Bucheon Hana Bank	Bucheon, Gyeonggi-do	2012	0
Busan BNK Sum	Busan	2019	1
Cheongju KB Stars	Cheongju, Chungcheongbuk-do	1963	3
Incheon Shinhan Bank S-Birds	Incheon	1986	8
Yongin Samsung Life Blueminx	Yongin, Gyeonggi-do	1977	6

== See also ==
- Korean Basketball League
