= Basketball at the 2018 Asian Games =

- Venue: Gelora Bung Karno Basketball Hall; Gelora Bung Karno Tennis Center Court; Istora Gelora Bung Karno
- Dates: 14 August – 1 September 2018
- Competitors: 414 from 25 nations

Basketball at the 2018 Asian Games was held in Jakarta, Indonesia from 14 August to 1 September 2018 and contested two events: 5x5 and 3x3 basketball. This was the first Asian Games tournament for 3x3 basketball.

== Schedule ==
P	Preliminary round	C	Classification	¼	Quarterfinals	½	Semifinals	F	Finals

Event↓/Date →	14th Tue	15th Wed	16th Thu	17th Fri	18th Sat	19th Sun	20th Mon	21st Tue	22nd Wed	23rd Thu	24th Fri	25th Sat	26th Sun			27th Mon	28th Tue	29th Wed	30th Thu	31st Fri	1st Sat
Basketball
Men	P		P				P	P	P	P		P				¼	C		½	C	F
Women		P		P		P	P	P		P			¼				C		½	C	F
3x3 basketball
Men								P	P		P	P	¼	½	F						
Women								P	P		P	P	¼	½	F						

== Medalists ==
=== Basketball ===
Event	Gold	Silver	Bronze
Men	China; Tian Yuxiang; Fang Shuo; Zhao Tailong; Yu Changdong; Ding Yanyuhang; Zhao Rui; Liu Zhixuan; Zhou Qi; Dong Hanlin; Sun Minghui; Abdusalam Abdurixit; Wang Zhelin	Iran; Meisam Mirzaei; Sajjad Mashayekhi; Aren Davoudi; Behnam Yakhchali; Vahid Dalirzahan; Rouzbeh Arghavan; Mohammad Jamshidi; Samad Nikkhah Bahrami; Hamed Haddadi; Navid Rezaeifar; Arsalan Kazemi; Mohammad Hassanzadeh	South Korea; Kim Jun-il; Park Chan-hee; Choi Jun-yong; Lee Jung-hyun; Kim Sun-hyung; Heo Hoon; Heo Ung; Heo Il-young; Kang Sang-jae; Jeon Jun-beom; Ra Gun-ah; Lee Seoung-hyun
Women	China; Yang Liwei; Li Yuan; Wang Siyu; Wang Lili; Shao Ting; Li Meng; Wang Xuemeng; Huang Sijing; Liu Jiacen; Sun Mengran; Li Yueru; Han Xu	Korea; Kang Lee-seul; Park Ji-hyun; Kim Hye-yon; Park Hye-jin; Choi Eun-sil; Jang Mi-gyong; Park Ha-na; Lim Yung-hui; Ro Suk-yong; Kim So-dam; Park Ji-su; Kim Han-byul	Japan; Layla Takehara; Stephanie Mawuli; Haruka Suzuki; Mio Shinozaki; Shiori Yasuma; Miyuki Kawamura; Moe Nagata; Saki Hayashi; Saori Miyazaki; Tamami Nakada; Aya Watanabe; Kadysha Umezawa

=== 3x3 basketball ===
Event	Gold	Silver	Bronze
Men	China; Chen Gong; Xiao Hailiang; Huang Wenwei; Zeng Bingqiang	South Korea; An Young-jun; Kim Nak-hyeon; Park In-tae; Yang Hong-seok	Iran; Ali Allahverdi; Amir Hossein Azari; Navid Khajehzadeh; Mohammad Yousefvand
Women	China; Li Yingyun; Dilana Dilixiati; Jiang Jiayin; Zhang Zhiting	Japan; Ririka Okuyama; Norika Konno; Stephanie Mawuli; Kiho Miyashita	Thailand; Amphawa Thuamon; Thunchanok Lumdabpang; Warunee Kitraksa; Rujiwan Bunsinprom

== Medal table ==
Rank	Nation	Gold	Silver	Bronze	Total
1	China (CHN)	4	0	0	4
2	Iran (IRI)	0	1	1	2
2	Japan (JPN)	0	1	1	2
2	South Korea (KOR)	0	1	1	2
5	Korea (COR)	0	1	0	1
6	Thailand (THA)	0	0	1	1
Totals (6 entries)		4	4	4	12

== Draw ==
The official draw for both the men's and women's basketball events were held on 5 July 2018 in Jakarta. The teams were seeded based on their final ranking at the 2014 Asian Games.

=== Men ===
Group A

- South Korea (1)
- Mongolia (8)
- Indonesia
- Thailand

Group B

- Iran (2)
- Philippines (7)*
- Syria
- ~~United Arab Emirates~~*

Group C

- Japan (3)
- Qatar (6)
- Chinese Taipei
- Hong Kong

Group D

- Kazakhstan (4)
- China (5)
- ~~Palestine~~*

* The Philippines and Palestine withdrew after the draw. On 5 August, the Philippines, through a hastily made press conference by their national basketball federation, decided to field a team but they were placed in Group D to balance the number of teams in each group. The United Arab Emirates withdrew few days before the start of the competition.

=== Women ===
Group X

- Korea (1)
- Chinese Taipei (4)
- Indonesia
- Kazakhstan
- India

Group Y

- China (2)
- Japan (3)
- Thailand
- Hong Kong
- Mongolia

== Final standing ==
=== Basketball ===
==== Men ====
Rank	Team	Pld	W	L
1st place, gold medalist(s)	China	5	5	0
2nd place, silver medalist(s)	Iran	4	3	1
3rd place, bronze medalist(s)	South Korea	6	5	1
4	Chinese Taipei	6	4	2
5	Philippines	5	3	2
6	Syria	4	1	3
7	Japan	6	3	3
8	Indonesia	6	1	5
9	Qatar	3	1	2
10	Mongolia	3	1	2
11	Kazakhstan	2	0	2
12	Thailand	3	1	2
13	Hong Kong	3	0	3

==== Women ====
Rank	Team	Pld	W	L
1st place, gold medalist(s)	China	7	7	0
2nd place, silver medalist(s)	Korea	7	5	2
3rd place, bronze medalist(s)	Japan	7	5	2
4	Chinese Taipei	7	5	2
5	Kazakhstan	7	4	3
6	Thailand	7	3	4
7	Indonesia	7	2	5
8	Mongolia	7	1	6
9	India	4	0	4
10	Hong Kong	4	0	4

=== 3x3 basketball ===
==== Men ====
Rank	Team	Pld	W	L
1st place, gold medalist(s)	China	7	7	0
2nd place, silver medalist(s)	South Korea	7	6	1
3rd place, bronze medalist(s)	Iran	8	7	1
4	Thailand	7	4	3
5	Japan	6	5	1
6	Qatar	6	4	2
7	Chinese Taipei	5	3	2
8	Kazakhstan	6	3	3
9	Iraq	5	3	2
10	Syria	5	3	2
11	Indonesia	4	2	2
12	Mongolia	4	2	2
13	Malaysia	5	2	3
14	Nepal	5	2	3
15	Turkmenistan	5	2	3
16	Sri Lanka	4	1	3
17	Kyrgyzstan	4	1	3
18	Jordan	5	1	4
19	Afghanistan	5	0	5
20	Bangladesh	4	0	4
21	Vietnam	4	0	4
—	Maldives	5	0	5

==== Women ====
Rank	Team	Pld	W	L
1st place, gold medalist(s)	China	6	6	0
2nd place, silver medalist(s)	Japan	6	5	1
3rd place, bronze medalist(s)	Thailand	6	5	1
4	Chinese Taipei	6	3	3
5	South Korea	4	3	1
6	Indonesia	4	2	2
7	Malaysia	4	2	2
8	Iran	4	2	2
9	Vietnam	3	1	2
10	Sri Lanka	3	1	2
11	Kazakhstan	3	1	2
12	Mongolia	3	1	2
13	Syria	3	0	3
14	Nepal	3	0	3
15	Qatar	3	0	3
—	Maldives	3	0	3
