= Basketball at the 2018 Asian Games – Women's tournament =

Women at the 2018 Asian Games
- Venues: Gelora Bung Karno Basketball Hall; Istora Gelora Bung Karno
- Date: 15 August – 1 September 2018
- Competitors: 120 from 10 nations

Medalists
gold medal	China
silver medal	Korea
bronze medal	Japan

The women's 5-on-5 basketball tournament at the 2018 Asian Games was held in Jakarta, Indonesia from 15 August to 1 September 2018.

== Squads ==
China	Chinese Taipei	Hong Kong	India
Yang Liwei; Li Yuan; Wang Siyu; Wang Lili; Shao Ting; Li Meng; Wang Xuemeng; Huang Sijing; Liu Jiacen; Sun Mengran; Li Yueru; Han Xu	Huang Ling-chuan; Chen Yu-chun; Chen Yen-yu; Huang Fan-shan; Wu Ying-chieh; Huang Ying-li; Huang Ping-jen; Wang Wei-lin; Cheng I-hsiu; Bao Hsi-le; Peng Szu-chin; Lin Yu-ting	Ma Tan Fung; Kwong Hiu Lam; Wong Yan Ling; Cheuk Ting; Wong Ki Ki; Wong Po Sze; Wong Tsz Ching; Li Tsz Kwan; Wong Ka Man; Lam Pik Yi; Wong Ka Yee; Chan Ching Hang	P. G. Anjana; Sangeeta Kaur; Stephy Nixon; H. M. Bhandavya; Pushpa Senthil Kumar; Raspreet Sidhu; Madhu Kumari; Priyanka Prabhakara; Raja Priyadharshini; P. S. Jeena; Shireen Limaye; Nisha Sharma
Indonesia	Japan	Kazakhstan	Korea
Ivonne Sinatra; Kadek Pratita Citta Dewi; Nathasa Debby Christaline; Priscilla Annabel Karen; Dyah Lestari; Adelaide Wongsohardjo; Christine Tjundawan; Vonny Hantoro; Nathania Orville; Sophia Gabriel; Henny Sutjiono; Clarita Antonio	Layla Takehara; Stephanie Mawuli; Haruka Suzuki; Mio Shinozaki; Shiori Yasuma; Miyuki Kawamura; Moe Nagata; Saki Hayashi; Saori Miyazaki; Tamami Nakada; Aya Watanabe; Kadysha Umezawa	Elmira Abikeyeva; Zalina Kurazova; Rufina Gavrilyuk; Oxana Bagmet; Tamara Yagodkina; Mariya Astapenko; Olga Kolesnikova; Oxana Ivanova; Anna Vinokurova; Nadezhda Kondrakova; Alexandra Kovalevskaya; Oxana Ossipenko	Kang Lee-seul; Park Ji-hyun; Kim Hye-yon; Park Hye-jin; Choi Eun-sil; Jang Mi-gyong; Park Ha-na; Lim Yung-hui; Ro Suk-yong; Kim So-dam; Park Ji-su; Kim Han-byul
Mongolia	Thailand		
Muratyn Bulbul; Buriadyn Altanzayaa; Alimaagiin Khulan; Bayarmaagiin Tsatsral; Battogtokhyn Önörzayaa; Erdenegiin Ariuntungalag; Ganbatyn Bayartsetseg; Dashnyamyn Bayanjargal; Otgonbayaryn Bolortuyaa; Bayankhüügiin Erdene-Otgon; Bayasgalangiin Solongo; Ulaankhüügiin Enerel	Penphan Yothanan; Pimchosita Supyen; Supavadee Kunchuan; Wipaporn Saechua; Suree Phromrat; Atchara Kaichaiyapoom; Pornnutcha Sawatong; Yanee Phosut; Kloyjai Phetsaenkha; Supira Klanbut; Thidaporn Maihom; Kanokwan Prajuapsook		

== Results ==
All times are Western Indonesia Time (UTC+07:00)

=== Preliminary ===
==== Group X ====
Pos	Team	Pld	W	L	PF	PA	PD	Pts	Qualification
1	Chinese Taipei	4	4	0	358	239	+119	8	Quarterfinals
2	Korea	4	3	1	382	238	+144	7	Quarterfinals
3	Kazakhstan	4	2	2	263	291	−28	6	Quarterfinals
4	Indonesia	4	1	3	233	374	−141	5	Quarterfinals
5	India	4	0	4	242	336	−94	4	

Source: OCA

15 August
12:30

Kazakhstan	42–72	Chinese Taipei
Scoring by quarter: 6–16, 12–20, 11–19, 13–17
Pts: Kondrakova 11; Rebs: Kondrakova 12; Asts: Yagodkina 4		Pts: Peng 16; Rebs: Huang F. 8 Asts: Huang F. 9

Gelora Bung Karno Basketball Hall, Jakarta
Referees: Ferdinand Pascual (PHI), Watcharin Padungratchadakit (THA), Cui Zhexiong (CHN)

15 August
18:30

Korea	108–40	Indonesia
Scoring by quarter: 25–8, 33–12, 21–9, 29–11
Pts: Ro 22; Rebs: Ro 8 Asts: Kim S. 6		Pts: Christaline 17; Rebs: four players 4 Asts: Wongsohardjo, Sutjiono 2

Gelora Bung Karno Basketball Hall, Jakarta
Referees: Zhu Duan (CHN), Preeda Muongmee (THA), Jun Horiuchi (JPN)

17 August
10:00

Chinese Taipei	87–85 (OT)	Korea
Scoring by quarter: 21–23, 22–17, 16–18, 14–15, Overtime: 14–12
Pts: Peng 21; Rebs: Huang P., Bao 7 Asts: Peng 8		Pts: Ro 32; Rebs: Kim H. 9 Asts: Lim 10

Gelora Bung Karno Basketball Hall, Jakarta
Referees: Zhu Duan (CHN), Watcharin Padungratchadakit (THA), Kumiko Kumagai (JPN)

17 August
16:00

India	61–79	Kazakhstan
Scoring by quarter: 13–18, 12–19, 21–22, 15–20
Pts: Jeena 15; Rebs: Anjana 10; Asts: Anjana 10		Pts: Yagodkina 21; Rebs: Kondrakova 11; Asts: Yagodkina, Kolesnikova 6

Gelora Bung Karno Basketball Hall, Jakarta
Referees: Yuen Chun Yip (HKG), Cui Zhexiong (CHN), Jun Horiuchi (JPN)

19 August
10:00

Chinese Taipei	84–61	India
Scoring by quarter: 18–17, 15–11, 31–17, 20–16
Pts: Peng 14; Rebs: Huang L. 6 Asts: Lin 7		Pts: Jeena 13; Rebs: Limaye 7 Asts: Limaye 6

Gelora Bung Karno Basketball Hall, Jakarta
Referees: Mohammad Doust (IRI), Preeda Muongmee (THA), Anan Daraghma (PLE)

19 August
18:30

Indonesia	73–85	Kazakhstan
Scoring by quarter: 14–18, 17–25, 13–23, 29–19
Pts: Christaline 30; Rebs: Christaline 7 Asts: Tjundawan, Sutjiono 3		Pts: Kondrakova 18; Rebs: Kondrakova 9 Asts: Kurazova 7

Gelora Bung Karno Basketball Hall, Jakarta
Referees: Ferdinand Pascual (PHI), Cui Zhexiong (CHN), Jun Horiuchi (JPN)

20 August
10:00

Korea	104–54	India
Scoring by quarter: 22–12, 27–10, 25–17, 30–15
Pts: Kang 17; Rebs: Park J.H. 7 Asts: Jang 8		Pts: Kumari 14; Rebs: Jeena 10; Asts: Jeena 6

Gelora Bung Karno Basketball Hall, Jakarta
Referees: Hadi Salem (IRI), Jun Horiuchi (JPN), Watcharin Padungratchadakit (THA)

21 August
10:00

Kazakhstan	57–85	Korea
Scoring by quarter: 12–29, 17–18, 12–22, 16–16
Pts: Kolesnikova, Kondrakova 10; Rebs: Kondrakova 8 Asts: Astapenko 4		Pts: Ro 19; Rebs: Park J.H., Ro 7 Asts: Park H.J. 10

Gelora Bung Karno Basketball Hall, Jakarta
Referees: Ferdinand Pascual (PHI), Kumiko Kumagai (JPN), Cui Zhexiong (CHN)

21 August
18:30

Indonesia	51–115	Chinese Taipei
Scoring by quarter: 12–34, 12–32, 9–24, 18–25
Pts: Christaline 16; Rebs: Orville 7 Asts: Christaline, Orville, Sutjiono 3		Pts: Huang L. 26; Rebs: Cheng 13; Asts: Huang F. 11

Gelora Bung Karno Basketball Hall, Jakarta
Referees: Mohammad Doust (IRI), Preeda Muongmee (THA), Anan Daraghma (PLE)

23 August
18:30

India	66–69	Indonesia
Scoring by quarter: 14–17, 15–14, 21–21, 16–17
Pts: Nixon 18; Rebs: Jeena 17; Asts: Limaye 8		Pts: Christaline 21; Rebs: Gabriel 12; Asts: Tjundawan 6

Gelora Bung Karno Basketball Hall, Jakarta
Referees: Watcharin Padungratchadakit (THA), Jun Horiuchi (JPN), Cui Zhexiong (CHN)

==== Group Y ====
Pos	Team	Pld	W	L	PF	PA	PD	Pts	Qualification
1	China	4	4	0	448	182	+266	8	Quarterfinals
2	Japan	4	3	1	392	225	+167	7	Quarterfinals
3	Thailand	4	2	2	231	316	−85	6	Quarterfinals
4	Mongolia	4	1	3	193	358	−165	5	Quarterfinals
5	Hong Kong	4	0	4	230	413	−183	4	

Source: OCA

15 August
10:00

China	110–42	Thailand
Scoring by quarter: 30–7, 23–12, 30–14, 27–9
Pts: Sun 16; Rebs: Sun 10; Asts: Li Yua. 7		Pts: Prajuapsook 11; Rebs: Prajuapsook 4 Asts: Phromrat 3

Gelora Bung Karno Basketball Hall, Jakarta
Referees: Snehal Bendke (IND), Alexey Stepanenko (KAZ), Budi Marfan (INA)

15 August
16:00

Hong Kong	44–121	Japan
Scoring by quarter: 13–29, 15–33, 6–34, 10–25
Pts: Li 13; Rebs: Wong K.Y. 5 Asts: Wong T. 3		Pts: Nagata 23; Rebs: Umezawa 13; Asts: Yasuma, Miyazaki 12

Gelora Bung Karno Basketball Hall, Jakarta
Referees: Yevgeniy Mikheyev (KAZ), Lee Ji-youn (KOR), Johan Christiana (INA)

17 August
12:30

Japan	73–105	China
Scoring by quarter: 22–35, 19–20, 18–26, 14–24
Pts: Hayashi 17; Rebs: Suzuki 6 Asts: Miyazaki 12		Pts: Li M., Liu 18; Rebs: Sun, Han 8 Asts: Shao 7

Gelora Bung Karno Basketball Hall, Jakarta
Referees: Snehal Bendke (IND), Alexey Stepanenko (KAZ), Haryanto Sutaryo (INA)

17 August
18:30

Mongolia	83–79	Hong Kong
Scoring by quarter: 22–12, 25–26, 17–22, 19–19
Pts: Bulbul 37; Rebs: Solongo 13; Asts: Önörzayaa 7		Pts: Li 22; Rebs: Wong P., Wong K.M. 7 Asts: Li 6

Gelora Bung Karno Basketball Hall, Jakarta
Referees: Harja Jaladri (INA), Lee Ji-youn (KOR), Anan Daraghma (PLE)

19 August
12:30

Japan	107–35	Mongolia
Scoring by quarter: 30–11, 34–8, 25–11, 18–5
Pts: Shinozaki 19; Rebs: Suzuki 15; Asts: Yasuma 9		Pts: Bulbul 16; Rebs: Bayartsetseg 7 Asts: Bulbul 3

Gelora Bung Karno Basketball Hall, Jakarta
Referees: Kim Jong-kuk (KOR), Imran Ali Baig (IND), Johan Christiana (INA)

19 August
16:00

Thailand	86–76	Hong Kong
Scoring by quarter: 18–16, 23–15, 19–28, 26–17
Pts: Maihom 24; Rebs: Maihom 10; Asts: Saechua, Phromrat 5		Pts: Wong K.M. 23; Rebs: Wong P. 13; Asts: Wong Y., Li 4

Gelora Bung Karno Basketball Hall, Jakarta
Referees: Snehal Bendke (IND), Hadi Salem (IRI), Budi Marfan (INA)

20 August
12:30

China	110–36	Mongolia
Scoring by quarter: 26–15, 31–9, 26–9, 27–3
Pts: Li Yue. 21; Rebs: Li Yue. 11; Asts: Wang S. 8		Pts: Bulbul 15; Rebs: Enerel 9 Asts: Bulbul 4

Gelora Bung Karno Basketball Hall, Jakarta
Referees: Alexey Stepanenko (KAZ), Snehal Bendke (IND), Lee Ji-youn (KOR)

21 August
12:30

Thailand	41–91	Japan
Scoring by quarter: 10–28, 13–22, 16–20, 2–21
Pts: Maihom 12; Rebs: Kunchuan 6 Asts: Saechua, Klanbut 3		Pts: Watanabe 27; Rebs: Umezawa 8 Asts: Yasuma 11

Gelora Bung Karno Basketball Hall, Jakarta
Referees: Snehal Bendke (IND), Chen Ying-cheng (TPE), Budi Marfan (INA)

23 August
10:00

Hong Kong	31–123	China
Scoring by quarter: 12–31, 10–29, 5–37, 4–26
Pts: Cheuk 7 Rebs: Wong P. 5 Asts: Wong K.M. 3		Pts: Han 26; Rebs: Li Yue. 11; Asts: Li Yua. 8

Gelora Bung Karno Basketball Hall, Jakarta
Referees: Harja Jaladri (INA), Alexey Stepanenko (KAZ), Kim Jong-kuk (KOR)

23 August
12:30

Mongolia	39–62	Thailand
Scoring by quarter: 6–10, 12–13, 12–21, 9–18
Pts: Bulbul 11; Rebs: Altanzayaa 13; Asts: Bayanjargal 4		Pts: Klanbut, Maihom 11; Rebs: Kunchuan 10; Asts: Kunchuan, Saechua 4

Gelora Bung Karno Basketball Hall, Jakarta
Referees: Yevgeniy Mikheyev (KAZ), Lee Ji-youn (KOR), Haryanto Sutaryo (INA)

=== Final round ===
Quarterfinals
26 August
Chinese Taipei	76
Mongolia	59
26 August
Korea	106
Thailand	63
26 August
Japan	104
Kazakhstan	57
26 August
China	141
Indonesia	37

Semifinals
30 August
Chinese Taipei	66
Korea	89
30 August
Japan	74
China	86

Gold medal game
1 September
Korea	65
China	71
Bronze medal game
1 September
Chinese Taipei	63
Japan	76

Classification 5–8
28 August
Mongolia	51
Thailand	80
28 August
Kazakhstan	93
Indonesia	65

Classification 5th–6th
31 August
Thailand	64
Kazakhstan	71
Classification 7th–8th
31 August
Mongolia	66
Indonesia	82

==== Quarterfinals ====
26 August
10:00

Chinese Taipei	76–59	Mongolia
Scoring by quarter: 11–14, 22–20, 20–9, 23–16
Pts: Huang Y. 28; Rebs: Wang 10; Asts: Huang F. 9		Pts: Solongo 14; Rebs: Bulbul, Solongo 7 Asts: Solongo 6

Gelora Bung Karno Basketball Hall, Jakarta
Referees: Snehal Bendke (IND), Kumiko Kumagai (JPN), Haryanto Sutaryo (INA)

26 August
12:30

Korea	106–63	Thailand
Scoring by quarter: 28–11, 32–8, 16–18, 30–26
Pts: Kang 20; Rebs: Choi 11; Asts: Park J.H. 8		Pts: Maihom 12; Rebs: Klanbut, Prajuapsook 6 Asts: four players 3

Gelora Bung Karno Basketball Hall, Jakarta
Referees: Hadi Salem (IRI), Budi Marfan (INA), Cui Zhexiong (CHN)

26 August
16:00

Japan	104–57	Kazakhstan
Scoring by quarter: 22–21, 23–7, 28–18, 31–11
Pts: Nakada, Watanabe 19; Rebs: Umezawa 9 Asts: Miyazaki 9		Pts: Kondrakova 14; Rebs: Kolesnikova, Kondrakova 9 Asts: Kolesnikova 3

Gelora Bung Karno Basketball Hall, Jakarta
Referees: Mohammad Doust (IRI), Watcharin Padungratchadakit (THA), Chen Ying-cheng (TPE)

26 August
18:30

China	141–37	Indonesia
Scoring by quarter: 40–6, 29–7, 40–5, 32–19
Pts: Li Yue. 25; Rebs: Li Yue. 10; Asts: Li Yua. 10		Pts: Christaline 10; Rebs: Gabriel 5 Asts: Christaline, Gabriel 3

Gelora Bung Karno Basketball Hall, Jakarta
Referees: Kim Jong-kuk (KOR), Preeda Muongmee (THA), Anan Daraghma (PLE)

==== Classification 5–8 ====
28 August
10:00

Mongolia	51–80	Thailand
Scoring by quarter: 11–17, 12–21, 18–13, 10–29
Pts: Bulbul 11; Rebs: Bulbul 10; Asts: Khulan 4		Pts: Yothanan, Klanbut, Prajuapsook 14; Rebs: Klanbut 9 Asts: Supyen, Klanbut 5

Gelora Bung Karno Basketball Hall, Jakarta
Referees: Lee Ji-youn (KOR), Chen Ying-cheng (TPE), Anan Daraghma (PLE)

28 August
12:30

Kazakhstan	93–65	Indonesia
Scoring by quarter: 27–14, 27–19, 15–17, 24–15
Pts: Yagodkina 20; Rebs: Kurazova 10; Asts: Yagodkina 10		Pts: Christaline 17; Rebs: Tjundawan 6 Asts: Gabriel 4

Gelora Bung Karno Basketball Hall, Jakarta
Referees: Snehal Bendke (IND), Jun Horiuchi (JPN), Cui Zhexiong (CHN)

==== Semifinals ====
30 August
10:00

Chinese Taipei	66–89	Korea
Scoring by quarter: 20–28, 15–22, 12–22, 19–17
Pts: Chen Y.C. 11; Rebs: Huang Y. 6 Asts: Peng 5		Pts: Park H.J., Lim, Ro 17; Rebs: Park J.S. 11; Asts: Park H.J. 10

Istora Gelora Bung Karno, Jakarta
Referees: Snehal Bendke (IND), Preeda Muongmee (THA), Hadi Salem (IRI)

30 August
12:30

Japan	74–86	China
Scoring by quarter: 17–20, 13–20, 24–31, 20–15
Pts: Shinozaki 17; Rebs: Nakada, Watanabe, Umezawa 4 Asts: Miyazaki 10		Pts: Shao 16; Rebs: Li Yue. 8 Asts: Shao 6

Istora Gelora Bung Karno, Jakarta
Referees: Watcharin Padungratchadakit (THA), Mohammad Doust (IRI), Haryanto Sutaryo (INA)

==== Classification 7th–8th ====
31 August
10:00

Mongolia	66–82	Indonesia
Scoring by quarter: 6–14, 16–31, 22–17, 22–20
Pts: Bayartsetseg 23; Rebs: Bulbul, Khulan, Enerel 5 Asts: Khulan 8		Pts: Christaline 37; Rebs: Gabriel 13; Asts: Gabriel, Sutjiono 7

Istora Gelora Bung Karno, Jakarta
Referees: Lee Ji-youn (KOR), Watcharin Padungratchadakit (THA), Cui Zhexiong (CHN)

==== Classification 5th–6th ====
31 August
16:00

Thailand	64–71	Kazakhstan
Scoring by quarter: 15–17, 13–14, 23–18, 13–22
Pts: Prajuapsook 19; Rebs: Maihom 6 Asts: Saechua 5		Pts: Kondrakova 17; Rebs: Ivanova 9 Asts: Kurazova 7

Istora Gelora Bung Karno, Jakarta
Referees: Snehal Bendke (IND), Kumiko Kumagai (JPN), Budi Marfan (INA)

==== Bronze medal game ====
1 September
10:00

Chinese Taipei	63–76	Japan
Scoring by quarter: 14–20, 19–6, 13–26, 17–24
Pts: Cheng 16; Rebs: Wang, Cheng 7 Asts: Chen Y.C. 5		Pts: Hayashi 17; Rebs: Umezawa 9 Asts: Miyazaki 11

Istora Gelora Bung Karno, Jakarta
Referees: Lee Ji-youn (KOR), Watcharin Padungratchadakit (THA), Imran Ali Baig (IND)

==== Gold medal game ====
1 September
16:00

Korea	65–71	China
Scoring by quarter: 22–23, 16–15, 15–20, 12–13
Pts: Lim 24; Rebs: Park J.S. 13; Asts: Park H.J. 6		Pts: Shao 17; Rebs: Liu, Li Yue. 10; Asts: Wang S. 5

Istora Gelora Bung Karno, Jakarta
Referees: Snehal Bendke (IND), Kumiko Kumagai (JPN), Mohammad Doust (IRI)

== Final standing ==
Rank	Team	Pld	W	L
1st place, gold medalist(s)	China	7	7	0
2nd place, silver medalist(s)	Korea	7	5	2
3rd place, bronze medalist(s)	Japan	7	5	2
4	Chinese Taipei	7	5	2
5	Kazakhstan	7	4	3
6	Thailand	7	3	4
7	Indonesia	7	2	5
8	Mongolia	7	1	6
9	India	4	0	4
10	Hong Kong	4	0	4
