= Dragon boat at the 2018 Asian Games =

- Venue: Jakabaring Lake
- Dates: 25–27 August 2018
- Competitors: 341 from 11 nations

Dragon boat (traditional boat race) at the 2018 Asian Games was held in Palembang, Indonesia from 25 to 27 August 2018 as a part of the canoeing competition. All events were held at Jakabaring Lake.

== Schedule ==
H	Heats	R	Repechages	S	Semifinals	F	Finals

Event↓/Date →	25th Sat				26th Sun				27th Mon			
Men's 200 m	H	R	S	F								
Men's 500 m					H	R	S	F				
Men's 1000 m									H	R	S	F
Women's 200 m	H	R	S	F								
Women's 500 m					H	R	S	F				

== Medalists ==
=== Men ===
Event	Gold	Silver	Bronze
200 m	China; Jiao Fangxu; Gao Jiawen; Cai Wenxuan; Liu Xuegang; Du Zhuan; Yin Zhonghai; Zhang Zhen; Zeng Delin; Chen Guangqin; Su Bopin; Li Shuai; Chen Juntong; Ling Wenwei; Feng Guojing; Li Guisen; Zhou Guichao	Chinese Taipei; Yin Wan-ting; Wu Wei-min; Wu Chun-chieh; Wu Chen-po; Tuan Yen-yu; Lin Sheng-ru; Lin Min-hao; Ho Chia-lin; Chuang Ying-chieh; Chou En-ping; Chou Chih-wei; Chien Cheng-yen; Chen Chou Yueh-hung; Chen Yu-an; Chen Tzu-hsien; Chang Sheng-huang	Thailand; Natthawat Waenphrom; Chaiyakarn Choochuen; Asdawut Mitilee; Santas Mingwongyang; Laor Iamluek; Ekkapong Wongunjai; Wasan Upalasueb; Phakdee Wannamanee; Nares Naoprakon; Phawonrat Roddee; Tanawoot Waipinid; Nattawut Kaewsri; Kasemsit Borriboonwasin; Pornchai Tesdee; Vinya Seechomchuen; Boonsong Imtim
500 m	Chinese Taipei; Yin Wan-ting; Wu Wei-min; Wu Chun-chieh; Wu Chen-po; Tuan Yen-yu; Lin Sheng-ru; Lin Min-hao; Ho Chia-lin; Chuang Ying-chieh; Chou En-ping; Chou Chih-wei; Chien Cheng-yen; Chen Chou Yueh-hung; Chen Yu-an; Chen Tzu-hsien; Chang Sheng-huang	China; Jiao Fangxu; Gao Jiawen; Cai Wenxuan; Liu Xuegang; Du Zhuan; Yin Zhonghai; Zhang Zhen; Zeng Delin; Chen Guangqin; Su Bopin; Li Shuai; Chen Juntong; Ling Wenwei; Feng Guojing; Li Guisen; Zhou Guichao	Indonesia; Mochamad Taufan Wijaya; Anwar Tarra; Sutrisno; Syahrul Saputra; Dedi Saputra; Muhammad Yunus Rustandi; Andri Agus Mulyana; Poliyansyah; Erwin David Monim; Marjuki; Yuda Firmansyah; Arpan; Spens Stuber Mehue; Medi Juana; Muhammad Fajar Faturahman; Rio Akbar
1000 m	Chinese Taipei; Yin Wan-ting; Wu Wei-min; Wu Chun-chieh; Wu Chen-po; Tuan Yen-yu; Lin Sheng-ru; Lin Min-hao; Ho Chia-lin; Chuang Ying-chieh; Chou En-ping; Chou Chih-wei; Chien Cheng-yen; Chen Chou Yueh-hung; Chen Yu-an; Chen Tzu-hsien; Chang Sheng-huang	Indonesia; Mochamad Taufan Wijaya; Anwar Tarra; Sutrisno; Syahrul Saputra; Dedi Saputra; Muhammad Yunus Rustandi; Andri Agus Mulyana; Poliyansyah; Erwin David Monim; Marjuki; Yuda Firmansyah; Arpan; Spens Stuber Mehue; Medi Juana; Muhammad Fajar Faturahman; Rio Akbar	Korea; Yang Chol-jin; Ri Yong-hyok; Paek Won-ryol; O In-guk; Kim Pu-song; Kim Jin-il; Jon Chung-hyok; Choe Kyong-uk; Lee Hyeon-joo; Yeom Hee-tae; Park Cheol-min; An Hyun-jin; Shin Dong-jin; Kim Yong-gil; Jung Hoon-seock; Shin Seong-woo

=== Women ===
Event	Gold	Silver	Bronze
200 m	China; Peng Xiaojuan; Dong Aili; Chen Chen; Wang Jing; Wang Li; Xu Fengxue; Zhong Yuan; Chen Xue; Tang Shenglan; Song Yanbing; Liang Liping; Huang Yi; Hu Chen; Bai Ge; Pan Huizhu; Li Lianying	Indonesia; Ririn Puji Astuti; Since Lithasova Yom; Ramla B Fazriah Nurbayan; Alvonsina Monim; Stevani Maysche Ibo; Masripah; Shifa Garnika Nurkarim; Christina Kafolakari; Selvianti Devi Hidayat; Raudani Fitra; Astri Dwijayanti; Emiliana Deau; Aswiati; Riana Yulistrian; Risti Ardianti	Korea; To Myong-suk; Yun Un-jong; Ri Hyang; Kim Su-hyang; Jong Ye-song; Ho Su-jong; Cha Un-yong; Cha Un-gyong; Hyun Jae-chan; Kang Cho-hee; Lee Ye-lin; Choi Yu-seul; Jang Hyun-jung; Byun Eun-jeong; Jo Min-ji; Kim Hyeon-hee
500 m	Korea; To Myong-suk; Yun Un-jong; Ri Hyang; Kim Su-hyang; Jong Ye-song; Ho Su-jong; Cha Un-yong; Cha Un-gyong; Hyun Jae-chan; Kang Cho-hee; Lee Ye-lin; Choi Yu-seul; Jang Hyun-jung; Byun Eun-jeong; Jo Min-ji; Kim Hyeon-hee	China; Peng Xiaojuan; Dong Aili; Chen Chen; Wang Jing; Wang Li; Xu Fengxue; Zhong Yuan; Chen Xue; Tang Shenglan; Song Yanbing; Liang Liping; Huang Yi; Hu Chen; Bai Ge; Pan Huizhu; Li Lianying	Thailand; Kanittha Nennoo; Nipatcha Pootong; Nipaporn Nopsri; Pranchalee Moonkasem; Wararat Plodpai; Wanida Thammarat; Prapaporn Pumkhunthod; Suphatthra Kheha; Patthama Nanthain; Praewpan Kawsri; Nattakant Boonruang; Mintra Mannok; Jariya Kankasikam; Arisara Pantulap; Saowanee Khamsaeng; Jaruwan Chaikan

== Medal table ==
Rank	Nation	Gold	Silver	Bronze	Total
1	China (CHN)	2	2	0	4
2	Chinese Taipei (TPE)	2	1	0	3
3	Korea (COR)	1	0	2	3
4	Indonesia (INA)	0	2	1	3
5	Thailand (THA)	0	0	2	2
Totals (5 entries)		5	5	5	15

== Participating nations ==
A total of 341 athletes from 11 nations competed in dragon boat at the 2018 Asian Games:

- China (32)
- Chinese Taipei (32)
- Hong Kong (29)
- India (31)
- Indonesia (32)
- Korea (32)
- Malaysia (32)
- Myanmar (30)
- Philippines (27)
- Singapore (32)
- Thailand (32)
