= Korea at the 2018 Asian Games =

- Korean Unification Flag
- IOC code: COR

in Jakarta and Palembang, Indonesia 18 August–2 September 2018
- Competitors: 60 (26 from North Korea and 34 from South Korea) in 3 sports
- Flag bearers: Lim Yung-hui (South Korea); Ju Kyong-chol (North Korea)
- Medals Ranked 28th: Gold 1 Silver 1 Bronze 2 Total 4

Asian Games appearances (overview)
- 1951; 1954; 1958; 1962; 1966; 1970; 1974; 1978; 1982; 1986; 1990; 1994; 1998; 2002; 2006; 2010; 2014; 2018; 2022; 2026

South Korea and North Korea competed in some events at the 2018 Asian Games as a unified team, under the title "Korea" (IOC code: COR, from French name "Corée"). Both nations also marched together under a unified flag during the opening and closing ceremonies.

Korea claimed their first gold medal at the Games in the women's 500m canoeing event. The national folksong "Arirang" was played in the awarding ceremony.

== Background ==
In June 2018, representatives from both South Korea and North Korea agreed to march together under a unified flag and form combined teams to compete in the Asian Games, similar to what they did earlier in the year at the 2018 Winter Olympics.

The Olympic Council of Asia (OCA) has stated that the size of the Unified Korea teams shall not exceed the athlete quota which applies to teams of other participating nations the Asian Games. The two countries agreed to field teams in full 5-a-side women's basketball, men's and women's dragon boat, and men's and women's rowing

== Medalists ==
The following the unified Korean competitors won medals at the Games. In the by discipline sections below, medalists' names are bolded.

Medal	Name	Sport	Event	Date
Gold	To Myong-suk; Ri Hyang; Jong Ye-song; Cha Un-yong; Hyun Jae-chan^{M}; Lee Ye-lin; Jang Hyun-jung; Jo Min-ji; Yun Un-jong; Kim Su-hyang; Ho Su-jong; Cha Un-gyong; Kang Cho-hee; Choi Yu-seul; Byun Eun-jeong; Kim Hyeon-hee	Canoeing	Women's TBR-12 500 m	26 August
Silver	Kim Hye-yon; Jang Mi-gyong; Kang Lee-seul; Lim Yung-hui; Park Ji-su; Kim So-dam; Ro Suk-yong; Park Hye-jin; Kim Han-byul; Choi Eun-sil; Park Ha-na; Park Ji-hyun	Basketball	Women's tournament	1 September
Bronze	To Myong-suk; Ri Hyang; Jong Ye-song; Cha Un-yong; Hyun Jae-chan^{M}; Lee Ye-lin; Jang Hyun-jung; Jo Min-ji; Yun Un-jong; Kim Su-hyang; Ho Su-jong; Cha Un-gyong; Kang Cho-hee; Choi Yu-seul; Byun Eun-jeong; Kim Hyeon-hee	Canoeing	Women's TBR-12 200 m	25 August
Bronze	Kim Pu-song; Jon Chung-hyok; O In-guk; Ri Yong-hyok; Lee Hyeon-joo^{W}; Park Cheol-min; Shin Dong-jin; Jung Hoon-seock; Kim Jin-il; Choe Kyong-uk; Paek Won-ryol; Yang Chol-jin; Yeom Hee-tae; An Hyun-jin; Kim Yong-gil; Shin Seong-woo	Canoeing	Men's TBR-12 1000 m	27 August

M man, W woman

== Competitors ==
The following is a list of the number of competitors representing the unified Korea that participated at the Games:

Sport	Men		Women		Total
Sport	(North Korea)	(South Korea)	(North Korea)	(South Korea)	Total
Basketball	0	0	3	10	13
Canoeing	8	8	8	8	32
Rowing	6	7	1	1	15
Total	14	15	12	19	60

== Basketball ==
Summary

Team	Event	Group Stage					Quarterfinal	Semifinals / Pl.	Final / BM / Pl.	
Team	Event	Opposition Score	Opposition Score	Opposition Score	Opposition Score	Rank	Opposition Score	Opposition Score	Opposition Score	Rank
Korea women's	Women's tournament	Indonesia; W 108–40	Chinese Taipei; L 85–87	India; W 104–54	Kazakhstan; W 57–85	2 Q	Thailand; W 106–63	Chinese Taipei; W 89–66	China; L 65–71	2nd place, silver medalist(s)

=== 5x5 basketball ===
Korea women's team drawn in group X at the Games.

==== Women's tournament ====
Roster

The following is the unified Korea roster in the women's basketball tournament of the 2018 Asian Games. Kwak Joo-yeong from South Korea did not play.

Korea women's national basketball team – 2018 Asian Games roster
Players
Coaches

Pos.	No.	Name	Age – Date of birth	Height	Club	Ctr.
F	1	Kang Lee-seul	24 – April 5, 1994	1.80 m (5 ft 11 in)	Bucheon KEB Hana Bank	(South Korea)
G	2	Park Ji-hyun	18 – April 7, 2000	1.80 m (5 ft 11 in)	Soongeui Girls' High School	(South Korea)
G	3	Kim Hye-yon	20 – February 16, 1998	1.72 m (5 ft 8 in)		(North Korea)
G	5	Park Hye-jin	28 – July 22, 1990	1.80 m (5 ft 11 in)	Asan Woori Bank Wibee	(South Korea)
F	6	Choi Eun-sil	23 – August 17, 1994	1.80 m (5 ft 11 in)	Asan Woori Bank Wibee	(South Korea)
G	7	Jang Mi-gyong	25 – November 4, 1992	1.68 m (5 ft 6 in)		(North Korea)
G	10	Park Ha-na	27 – September 14, 1990	1.80 m (5 ft 11 in)	Yongin Samsung Blueminx	(South Korea)
F	11	Lim Yung-hui (C)	38 – May 29, 1980	1.80 m (5 ft 11 in)	Asan Woori Bank Wibee	(South Korea)
C	12	Ro Suk-yong	25 – January 28, 1993	1.82 m (6 ft 0 in)		(North Korea)
C	13	Kim So-dam	25 – January 4, 1993	1.85 m (6 ft 1 in)	Guri KDB Life Winnus	(South Korea)
C	19	Park Ji-su	19 – December 6, 1998	1.98 m (6 ft 6 in)	Las Vegas Aces	(United States)
F	35	Kim Han-byul	31 – November 21, 1986	1.80 m (5 ft 11 in)	Yongin Samsung Blueminx	(South Korea)

Head coach

- (South Korea) Lee Moon-kyu

Assistant coach(es)

- (North Korea) Jong Song-sim
- (South Korea) Ha Sook-rye

Legend

- (C) Team captain
- (NP) Naturalized player
- Club – describes last
  club before the tournament
- Age – describes age
  on 15 August 2018

Group X

Pos	Team	Pld	W	L	PF	PA	PD	Pts	Qualification
1	Chinese Taipei	4	4	0	358	239	+119	8	Quarterfinals
2	Korea	4	3	1	382	238	+144	7	Quarterfinals
3	Kazakhstan	4	2	2	263	291	−28	6	Quarterfinals
4	Indonesia	4	1	3	233	374	−141	5	Quarterfinals
5	India	4	0	4	242	336	−94	4	

Source: OCA

15 August
18:30

Korea	108–40	Indonesia
Scoring by quarter: 25–8, 33–12, 21–9, 29–11
Pts: Ro 22; Rebs: Ro 8 Asts: Kim S. 6		Pts: Christaline 17; Rebs: four players 4 Asts: Wongsohardjo, Sutjiono 2

Gelora Bung Karno Basketball Hall, Jakarta
Referees: Zhu Duan (CHN), Preeda Muongmee (THA), Jun Horiuchi (JPN)

17 August
10:00

Chinese Taipei	87–85 (OT)	Korea
Scoring by quarter: 21–23, 22–17, 16–18, 14–15, Overtime: 14–12
Pts: Peng 21; Rebs: Huang P., Bao 7 Asts: Peng 8		Pts: Ro 32; Rebs: Kim H. 9 Asts: Lim 10

Gelora Bung Karno Basketball Hall, Jakarta
Referees: Zhu Duan (CHN), Watcharin Padungratchadakit (THA), Kumiko Kumagai (JPN)

20 August
10:00

Korea	104–54	India
Scoring by quarter: 22–12, 27–10, 25–17, 30–15
Pts: Kang 17; Rebs: Park J.H. 7 Asts: Jang 8		Pts: Kumari 14; Rebs: Jeena 10; Asts: Jeena 6

Gelora Bung Karno Basketball Hall, Jakarta
Referees: Hadi Salem (IRI), Jun Horiuchi (JPN), Watcharin Padungratchadakit (THA)

21 August
10:00

Kazakhstan	57–85	Korea
Scoring by quarter: 12–29, 17–18, 12–22, 16–16
Pts: Kolesnikova, Kondrakova 10; Rebs: Kondrakova 8 Asts: Astapenko 4		Pts: Ro 19; Rebs: Park J.H., Ro 7 Asts: Park H.J. 10

Gelora Bung Karno Basketball Hall, Jakarta
Referees: Ferdinand Pascual (PHI), Kumiko Kumagai (JPN), Cui Zhexiong (CHN)

Quarterfinal

26 August
12:30

Korea	106–63	Thailand
Scoring by quarter: 28–11, 32–8, 16–18, 30–26
Pts: Kang 20; Rebs: Choi 11; Asts: Park J.H. 8		Pts: Maihom 12; Rebs: Klanbut, Prajuapsook 6 Asts: four players 3

Gelora Bung Karno Basketball Hall, Jakarta
Referees: Hadi Salem (IRI), Budi Marfan (INA), Cui Zhexiong (CHN)

Semifinal

30 August
10:00

Chinese Taipei	66–89	Korea
Scoring by quarter: 20–28, 15–22, 12–22, 19–17
Pts: Chen Y.C. 11; Rebs: Huang Y. 6 Asts: Peng 5		Pts: Park H.J., Lim, Ro 17; Rebs: Park J.S. 11; Asts: Park H.J. 10

Istora Gelora Bung Karno, Jakarta
Referees: Snehal Bendke (IND), Preeda Muongmee (THA), Hadi Salem (IRI)

Final

1 September
16:00

Korea	65–71	China
Scoring by quarter: 22–23, 16–15, 15–20, 12–13
Pts: Lim 24; Rebs: Park J.S. 13; Asts: Park H.J. 6		Pts: Shao 17; Rebs: Liu, Li Yue. 10; Asts: Wang S. 5

Istora Gelora Bung Karno, Jakarta
Referees: Snehal Bendke (IND), Kumiko Kumagai (JPN), Mohammad Doust (IRI)

== Canoeing ==
The Korea team participated in both men's and women's dragon boat.

Traditional boat race

Athlete	Event	Heats		Repechage		Semifinals		Final	
Athlete	Event	Time	Rank	Time	Rank	Time	Rank	Time	Rank
Kim Pu-song; Jon Chung-hyok; O In-guk; Ri Yong-hyok; Lee Hyeon-joo^{D}; Park Cheol-min; Shin Dong-jin; Jung Hoon-seock; Kim Jin-il; Choe Kyong-uk; Paek Won-ryol; Yang Chol-jin; Yeom Hee-tae; An Hyun-jin; Kim Yong-gil; Shin Seong-woo	Men's TBR-12 200 m	52.991	3 Q	Bye		53.006	4 FB	53.651	7
Kim Pu-song; Jon Chung-hyok; O In-guk; Ri Yong-hyok; Lee Hyeon-joo^{D}; Park Cheol-min; Shin Dong-jin; Jung Hoon-seock; Kim Jin-il; Choe Kyong-uk; Paek Won-ryol; Yang Chol-jin; Yeom Hee-tae; An Hyun-jin; Kim Yong-gil; Shin Seong-woo	Men's TBR-12 500 m	2:16.112	3 Q	Bye		2:16.416	4 FB	2:20.837	7
Kim Pu-song; Jon Chung-hyok; O In-guk; Ri Yong-hyok; Lee Hyeon-joo^{D}; Park Cheol-min; Shin Dong-jin; Jung Hoon-seock; Kim Jin-il; Choe Kyong-uk; Paek Won-ryol; Yang Chol-jin; Yeom Hee-tae; An Hyun-jin; Kim Yong-gil; Shin Seong-woo	Men's TBR-12 1000 m	5:21.100	6	4:44.730	1 Q	4:40.013	2 FA	4:36.459	3rd place, bronze medalist(s)
To Myong-suk; Ri Hyang; Jong Ye-song; Cha Un-yong; Hyun Jae-chan^{S}; Lee Ye-lin; Jang Hyun-jung; Jo Min-ji; Yun Un-jong; Kim Su-hyang; Ho Su-jong; Cha Un-gyong; Kang Cho-hee; Choi Yu-seul; Byun Eun-jeong; Kim Hyeon-hee	Women's TBR-12 200 m	57.362	3 Q	Bye		56.861	2 FA	56.851	3rd place, bronze medalist(s)
To Myong-suk; Ri Hyang; Jong Ye-song; Cha Un-yong; Hyun Jae-chan^{S}; Lee Ye-lin; Jang Hyun-jung; Jo Min-ji; Yun Un-jong; Kim Su-hyang; Ho Su-jong; Cha Un-gyong; Kang Cho-hee; Choi Yu-seul; Byun Eun-jeong; Kim Hyeon-hee	Women's TBR-12 500 m	2:24.044	1 Q	Bye		2:27.203	1 FA	2:24.788	1st place, gold medalist(s)

Drummer (D) and Steerer (S) need not be of the same gender.

== Rowing ==
Korea participated in the following three events - the lightweight men's four, lightweight men's eight, and lightweight women's double sculls.

Athlete	Event	Heats		Repechage		Final	
Athlete	Event	Time	Rank	Time	Rank	Time	Rank
Yun Chol-jin; Kim Chol-jin; Kim Su-min; Park Tae-hyun	Men's lightweight coxless four	7:12.74	4	7:08.12	4 FA	6:59.61	6
Ri Hyon-mong; Choe Myong-hak; Choe Kwang-guk; Jong Kwang-bok; Kang Ji-su; Kim Dong-hyeon; Kwon Seung-min; Myeong Su-seong; Hong Hun	Men's lightweight eight	6:28.62	3	6:29.49	3 FA	6:18.72	5
Kim Un-hui; Song Ji-sun	Women's lightweight double sculls	8:16.16	5 FA	—N/a		8:17.45	6

== See also ==
- Korea at the 2018 Asian Para Games
