= 2018 Asian Games Parade of Nations =

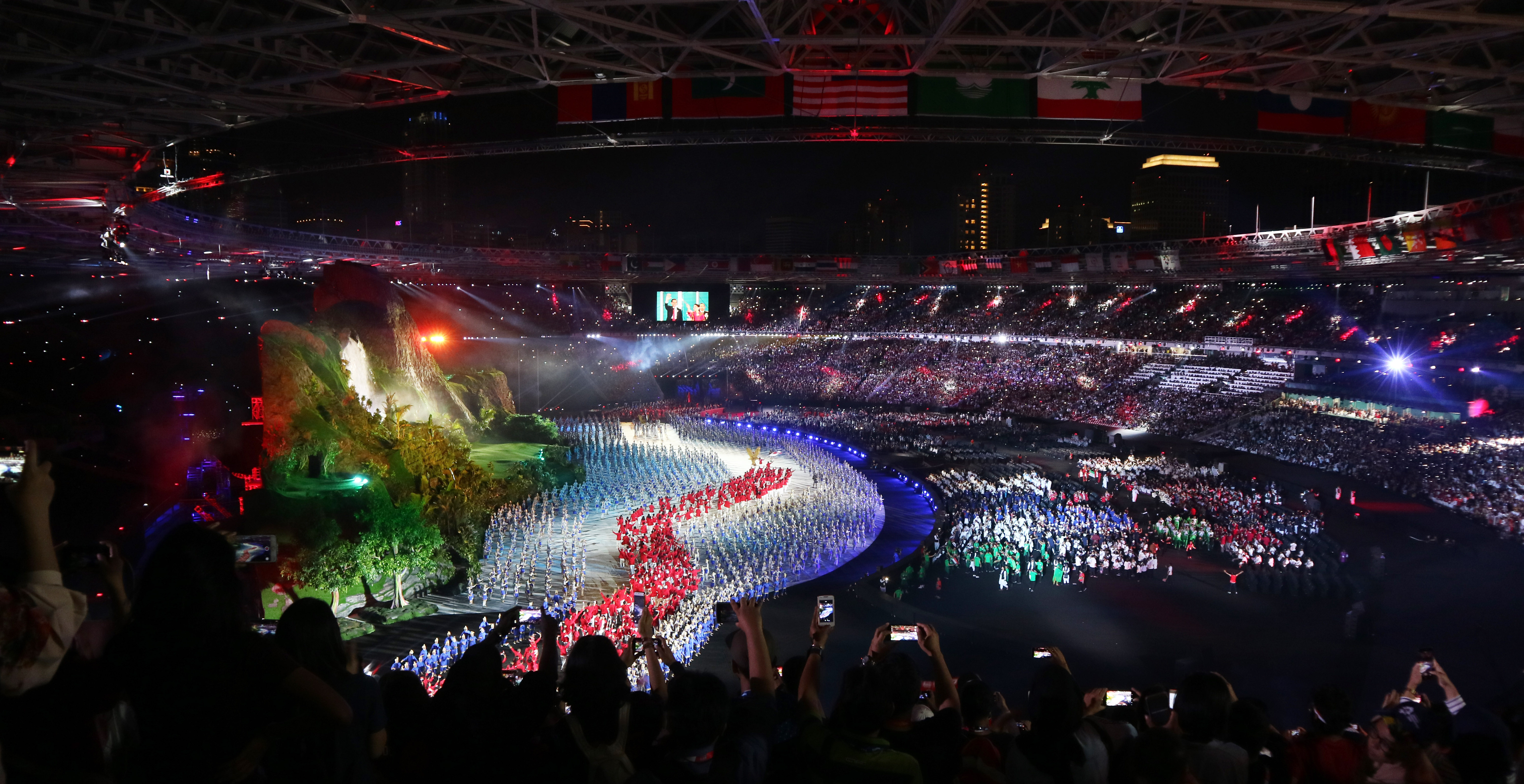
- Indonesia parades into the stadium.
- Date: 18 August 2018
- Time: 19:18 – 19:59 WIB (UTC+7)
- Location: Jakarta, Indonesia; 6°13′7″S 106°48′9″E

During the Parade of Nations at the 2018 Asian Games opening ceremony, beginning at 19:00 WIB (UTC+7) on 18 August 2018, athletes bearing the flags of their respective nations led their national delegations as they paraded into the Gelora Bung Karno Stadium in the co-host city of Jakarta, Indonesia, preceded by their flag and placard bearer. Each flag bearer had been chosen either by the nation's National Olympic Committee or by the athletes themselves. In keeping with tradition, the host nation, Indonesia entered last. 44 teams marched in (43 nations and the Unified Korea team).

Although the Games were held in Indonesia, English was used to organize the Parade of Nations (as per Olympic Council of Asia protocol determines that this element could be held in French or the International Olympic Committee three-letter codes) instead of Indonesian, the official language of the nation. Had the parade followed the Indonesian script, Afghanistan would have been followed by Saudi Arabia, and Jordan would have been the penultimate country before Indonesia.

== Parade order ==
Whilst most countries entered under their short names, a few entered under more formal or alternative names, mostly due to political and naming disputes. The Republic of China (commonly known as Taiwan) entered with the compromised name and flag of "Chinese Taipei" under T so that they did not enter together with conflicting China, under C.

== List ==
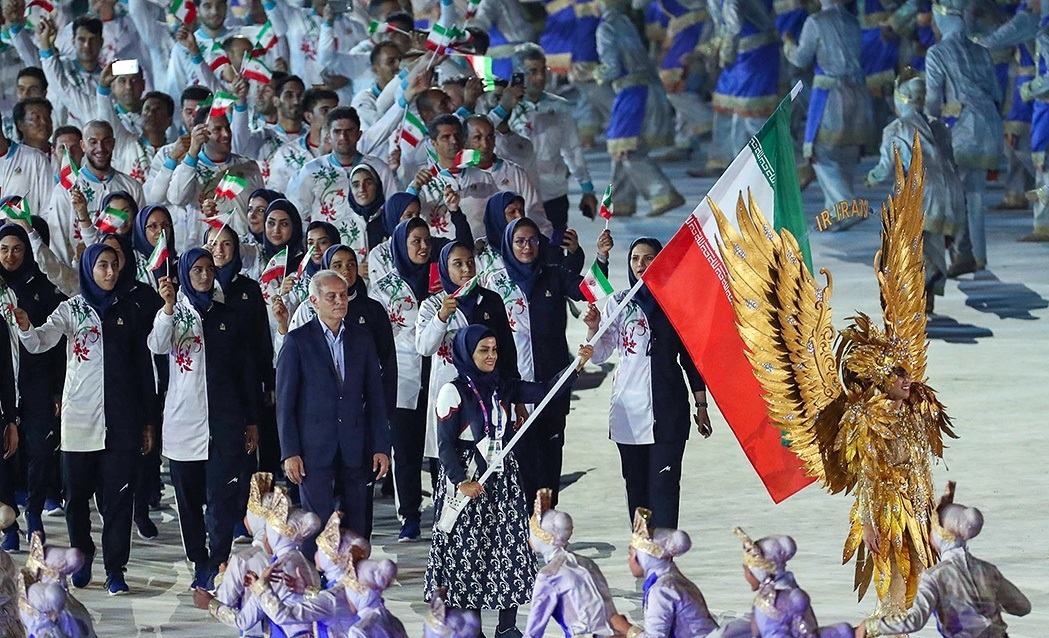
Iran enters the stadium

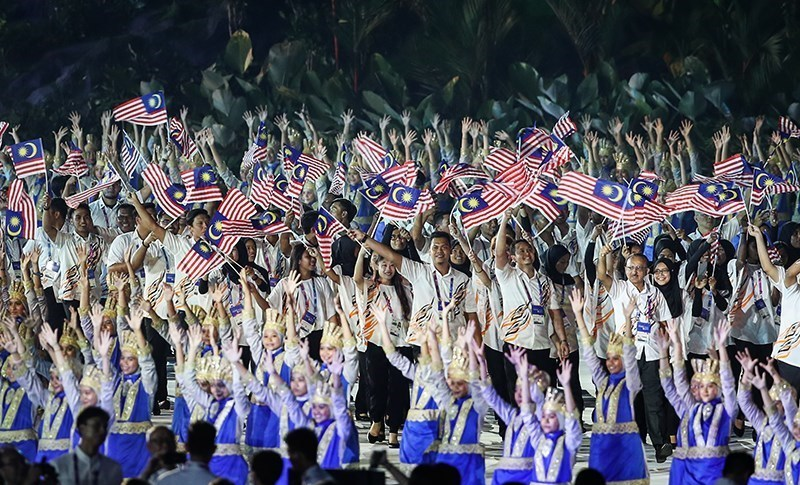
Malaysia enters the stadium

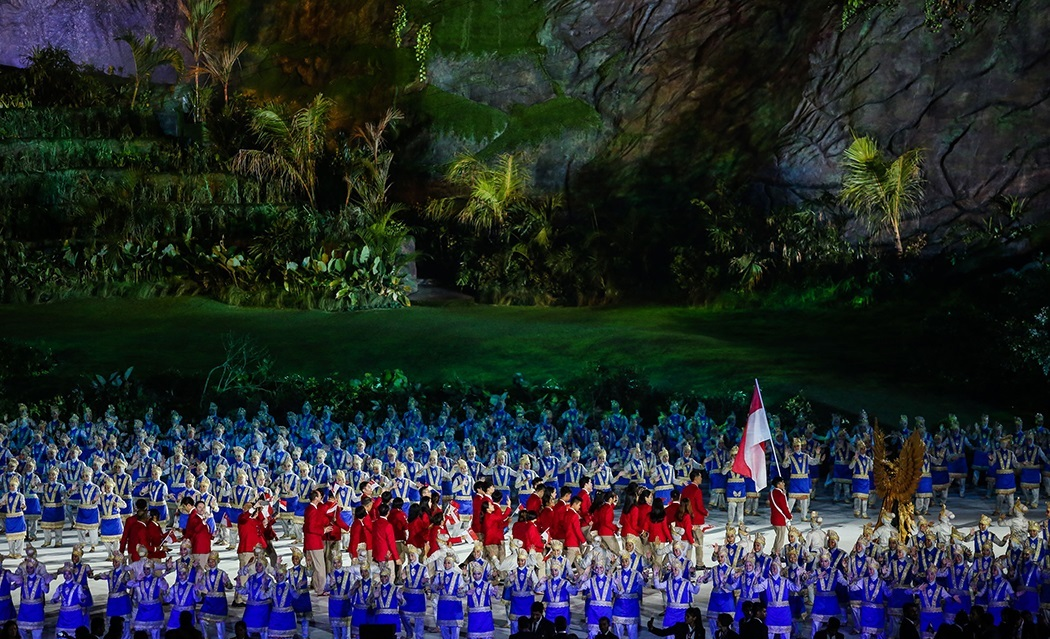
Singapore enters the stadium

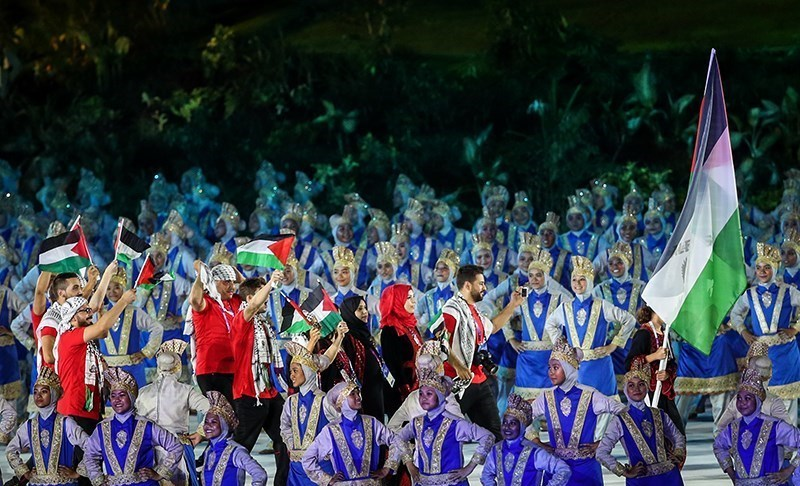
Palestine enters the stadium

Below is a list of parading countries and their announced flag bearer, in the same order as the parade. This is sortable by country name, flag bearer's name and flag bearer's sport. Names are given in the form officially designated by the OCA.

Order	Nation	Indonesian name	Flag bearer	Sport
1	Afghanistan (AFG)	Afganistan		
2	Bahrain (BRN)	Bahrain	Bader Nasser	Official
3	Bangladesh (BAN)	Bangladesh	Mabia Akhter	Weightlifting
4	Bhutan (BHU)	Bhutan	Karma Karma	Archery
5	Brunei (BRU) (Brunei Darussalam)	Brunei Darussalam	Basma Lachkar	Wushu
6	Cambodia (CAM)	Kamboja	Sorn Seavmey	Taekwondo
7	China (CHN)	Cina	Zhao Shuai	Taekwondo
8	Hong Kong (HKG) (Hong Kong, China) [sic]	Hong Kong, Tiongkok	Vivian Kong Man Wai	Fencing
9	India (IND)	India	Neeraj Chopra	Athletics
10	Iran (IRI) (IR Iran)	Republik Islam Iran	Elaheh Ahmadi	Shooting
11	Iraq (IRQ)	Irak		
12	Japan (JPN)	Jepang	Yukiko Ueno	Softball
13	Jordan (JOR)	Yordania	Ahmad Abu-Ghaush	Taekwondo
14	Kazakhstan (KAZ)	Kazakhstan	Abilkhan Amankul	Boxing
15	Korea (COR)	Korea	Lim Yung-hui (South Korea)	Basketball
15	Korea (COR)	Korea	Ju Kyong-chol (North Korea)	Football
16	Kuwait (KUW)	Kuwait	Essa Al-Zenkawi	Athletics
17	Kyrgyzstan (KGZ)	Kirgistan	Kanybek Uulu Onolbek	Volleyball
18	Laos (LAO)	Laos		
19	Lebanon (LBN)	Libanon	Gabriella Doueihy	Swimming
20	Macau (MAC) (Macau, China)	Makau, Tiongkok	Sio Ka Kun	Swimming
21	Malaysia (MAS)	Malaysia	Syakilla Salni	Karate
22	Maldives (MDV)	Maladewa	Aishath Sajina	Swimming
23	Mongolia (MGL)	Mongolia	Natsagsürengiin Zolboo	Wrestling
24	Myanmar (MYA)	Myanmar	Zaw Lwin Tun	Volleyball
25	Nepal (NEP)	Nepal	Kamal Bahadur Adhikari	Weightlifting
26	Oman (OMA)	Oman	Mahmood al Hassani	Field hockey
27	Pakistan (PAK)	Pakistan	Muhammad Rizwan Sr.	Field hockey
28	Palestine (PLE)	Palestina	Dania Nour	Swimming
29	Philippines (PHI)	Filipina	Jordan Clarkson	Basketball
30	Qatar (QAT)	Qatar	Abdulla Al-Tamimi	Squash
31	Saudi Arabia (KSA)	Arab Saudi	Ali Al-Othman	Weightlifting
32	Singapore (SGP)	Singapura	Hoe Wah Toon	Gymnastics
33	Sri Lanka (SRI)	Sri Lanka	Dinusha Gomes	Weightlifting
34	Syria (SYR)	Suriah	Abdulwahab Al-Hamwi	Basketball
35	Chinese Taipei (TPE)	Tionghoa Taipei	Kuo Hsing-chun	Weightlifting
36	Tajikistan (TJK)	Tajikistan	Rustam Iskandari	Wrestling
37	Thailand (THA)	Thailand	Pleumjit Thinkaow	Volleyball
38	Timor-Leste (TLS) (Timor Leste) [sic]	Timor-Leste		
39	Turkmenistan (TKM)	Turkmenistan	Ziyamuhammet Saparov	Wrestling
40	United Arab Emirates (UAE)	Uni Emirat Arab	Latifa Al Hosani	Fencing
41	Uzbekistan (UZB)	Uzbekistan	Isroil Madrimov	Boxing
42	Vietnam (VIE)	Vietnam	Vũ Thành An	Fencing
43	Yemen (YEM)	Yaman		
44	Indonesia (INA)	Indonesia	I Gede Siman Sudartawa	Swimming

- Iran and Saudi Arabia paraded as "IR Iran" and "Saudi Arabia" respectively, though the announcer called out the full names "Islamic Republic of Iran" and "Kingdom of Saudi Arabia".
