= Suputtra Beartong =

Thai sepak takraw player (born 1994)

Personal information
- Nationality: Thai
- Born: 31 August 1994 (age 31) Pathum Thani, Thailand
- Height: 160 cm (5 ft 3 in)
- Weight: 55 kg (121 lb)

Sport
- Country: Thailand
- Sport: sepak takraw
Medal record
Representing Thailand
Women's sepak takraw
Asian Games
Gold medal – first place	2018 Jakarta-Palembang	team regu

Suputtra Beartong (born 31 August 1994) is a Thai female sepak takraw player. She represented Thailand at the 2018 Asian Games and was part of the Thai women's squad which clinched gold in the regu event.
