= Wushu at the 2018 Asian Games – Men's taijiquan & taijijian =

Men's taijiquan & taijijian at the 2018 Asian Games
- Venue: Jakarta International Expo
- Dates: 21–22 August 2018
- Competitors: 17 from 14 nations

Medalists
gold medal	Chen Zhouli	China
silver medal	Tomohiro Araya	Japan
bronze medal	Nyein Chan Ko Ko	Myanmar

The men's taijiquan and taijijian all-round competition at the 2018 Asian Games in Jakarta, Indonesia was held from 21 August to 22 August at the JIExpo Kemayoran Hall B3.

== Schedule ==
All times are Western Indonesia Time (UTC+07:00)

Date	Time	Event
Tuesday, 21 August 2018	09:00	Taijiquan
Wednesday, 22 August 2018	09:00	Taijijian

== Results ==
Legend

- DNS — Did not start

Rank	Athlete	Taijiquan	Taijijian	Total
1st place, gold medalist(s)	Chen Zhouli (CHN)	9.75	9.76	19.51
2nd place, silver medalist(s)	Tomohiro Araya (JPN)	9.70	9.72	19.42
3rd place, bronze medalist(s)	Nyein Chan Ko Ko (MYA)	9.69	9.71	19.40
4	Samuei Hui (HKG)	9.70	9.69	19.39
5	Yu Won-hee (KOR)	9.70	9.69	19.39
6	Seo Hee-seong (KOR)	9.68	9.69	19.37
7	Daniel Parantac (PHI)	9.67	9.67	19.34
8	Gyandash Singh (IND)	9.59	9.70	19.29
9	Bobie Valentinus Gunawan (INA)	9.69	9.60	19.29
10	Jack Loh (MAS)	9.58	9.68	19.26
11	Cheong Pui Seng (MAC)	9.60	9.58	19.18
12	Sun Chia-hung (TPE)	9.70	9.40	19.10
13	Khant Min Htet (MYA)	9.41	9.41	18.82
14	Jones Llabres Inso (PHI)	9.67	8.62	18.29
15	Jo Saelee (THA)	9.00	9.17	18.17
16	Yousef Al-Khudhari (YEM)	7.80	8.20	16.00
—	Askarbay Yedilbayev (KAZ)			DNS
