= Sepak takraw at the 2018 Asian Games – Women's team regu =

Women's team regu at the 2018 Asian Games
- Venue: Ranau Sports Hall
- Date: 19–22 August 2018
- Competitors: 104 from 9 nations

Medalists
gold medal	Thailand
silver medal	South Korea
bronze medal	Myanmar
bronze medal	Vietnam

The women's team regu sepak takraw competition at the 2018 Asian Games was held at Ranau Sports Hall, Palembang, Indonesia from 19 to 22 August 2018.

== Squads ==
India	Indonesia	Japan	Laos
Chaoba Devi Oinam; Annam Tharangini; Maipak Devi Ayekpam; Nganthoi Chanu Yanglem; Manisha Kumari; Jwensinle Kesen; Dolly Srivastava; Rashmi; Pangambam Linthoingambi Chanu; Aruna Devi Mutum; Ronita Devi Elangbam; Khushbu	Maharani Wirowati; Leni; Dini Mita Sari; Sutini Binti Seni; Florensia Cristy; Lena; Akyko Micheel Kapito; Nur Isni Chikita Sumito; Kusnelia; Rini Susanti; Jasmini; Sri Ayu Astuti	Nagisa Makio; Sawa Aoki; Chiharu Yano; Satomi Ishihara; Yuumi Kawamata; Naoko Nakatsuka; Chinatsu Saegusa; Yuri Tanaka; Azusa Kikuchi	Ladsamee Vilaysouk; Falida Duangmala; Koy Xayavong; Norkham Vongxay; Sonsavan Keosouliya; Santisouk Chandala; Chiep Banxavang; Somphouk Phimmasone; Nouandam Volabouth; Namfonh Morladok; On Oumar Phaviset
Malaysia	Myanmar	South Korea	Thailand
Asumalin Rattana Som Chok; Nurul Izzatul Hikmah; Rahilah Harun; Nor Farhana Ismail; Nur Liyana Ismail; Nurrashidah Abdul Rashid; Emilia Eva Natasha; Nur Fatihah Azizul; Nurul Aqirah Mat Tahir; Siti Nor Suhaida Jafri; Razmah Anam; Kamisah Khamis	Kyu Kyu Thin; Khin Hnin Wai; Aye Aye Than; Nant Yin Yin Myint; Phyu Phyu Than; Su Mon Kyaw; Lairo Eng; Su Mon Aung; Nan Su Myat San; Ya Mong Zin; Nyein Chan Thu; Su Yee Htet	Kim Dong-hee; Kim I-seul; Bae Han-oul; Jeon Gyu-mi; Kim Ji-eun; Lee Min-ju; Choi Ji-na; Yu Seong-hee; Kim Ji-young; Kim Hee-jin; Park Seon-ju; Jung Ju-seung	Masaya Duangsri; Suputtra Beartong; Thitima Mahakusol; Kaewjai Pumsawangkaew; Sasiwimol Janthasit; Thidarat Soda; Fueangfa Praphatsarang; Nisa Thanaattawut; Nipaporn Salupphon; Somruedee Pruepruk; Payom Srihongsa; Wiphada Chitphuan
Vietnam			
Nguyễn Thị Quyên; Giáp Thị Hiền; Nguyễn Thị Thu Hạnh; Dương Thị Xuyên; Đặng Thị Phương Thanh; Hoàng Thị Hoà; Bùi Thị Hải Yến; Phạm Thị Hằng; Nguyễn Thị Phương Trinh; Trần Thị Thu Hoài; Nguyễn Thị My; Đặng Thị Mỹ Linh			

== Results ==
All times are Western Indonesia Time (UTC+07:00)

=== Preliminary ===
==== Group A ====
Pos	Team	Pld	W	L	MF	MA	MD	Pts	Qualification
1	Thailand	3	3	0	9	0	+9	6	Semifinals
2	South Korea	3	2	1	6	3	+3	4	Semifinals
3	Laos	3	1	2	2	7	−5	2	
4	India	3	0	3	1	8	−7	0	

Source: OCA

Date	Time		Score		Regu 1			Regu 2			Regu 3		
Date	Time		Score		Set 1	Set 2	Set 3	Set 1	Set 2	Set 3	Set 1	Set 2	Set 3
19 Aug	12:00	Thailand	3–0	Laos	2–0			2–0			2–0		
19 Aug	12:00	Thailand	3–0	Laos	21–10	21–9		21–6	21–13		21–14	21–4	
19 Aug	12:00	India	0–3	South Korea	0–2			0–2			0–2		
19 Aug	12:00	India	0–3	South Korea	11–21	5–21		8–21	8–21		14–21	6–21	
20 Aug	12:00	India	1–2	Laos	0–2			0–2			2–1		
20 Aug	12:00	India	1–2	Laos	13–21	14–21		17–21	16–21		21–16	16–21	25–24
20 Aug	12:00	Thailand	3–0	South Korea	2–0			2–0			2–0		
20 Aug	12:00	Thailand	3–0	South Korea	21–9	21–13		21–17	23–21		21–11	21–15	
21 Aug	12:00	Thailand	3–0	India	2–0			2–0			2–0		
21 Aug	12:00	Thailand	3–0	India	21–7	21–6		21–8	21–5		21–10	21–5	
21 Aug	12:00	Laos	0–3	South Korea	0–2			0–2			0–2		
21 Aug	12:00	Laos	0–3	South Korea	9–21	14–21		10–21	14–21		11–21	13–21	

==== Group B ====
Pos	Team	Pld	W	L	MF	MA	MD	Pts	Qualification
1	Vietnam	4	4	0	9	3	+6	8	Semifinals
2	Myanmar	4	3	1	9	3	+6	6	Semifinals
3	Indonesia	4	2	2	8	4	+4	4	
4	Malaysia	4	1	3	3	9	−6	2	
5	Japan	4	0	4	1	11	−10	0	

Source: OCA

Date	Time		Score		Regu 1			Regu 2			Regu 3		
Date	Time		Score		Set 1	Set 2	Set 3	Set 1	Set 2	Set 3	Set 1	Set 2	Set 3
19 Aug	09:00	Indonesia	1–2	Myanmar	2–0			1–2			0–2		
19 Aug	09:00	Indonesia	1–2	Myanmar	21–12	21–12		16–21	21–15	18–21	16–21	20–22	
19 Aug	09:00	Malaysia	0–3	Vietnam	0–2			1–2			0–2		
19 Aug	09:00	Malaysia	0–3	Vietnam	11–21	13–21		21–18	13–21	13–21	10–21	10–21	
19 Aug	15:00	Indonesia	3–0	Japan	2–0			2–0			2–0		
19 Aug	15:00	Indonesia	3–0	Japan	21–12	21–11		21–9	21–4		21–12	21–17	
19 Aug	15:00	Vietnam	2–1	Myanmar	0–2			2–0			2–0		
19 Aug	15:00	Vietnam	2–1	Myanmar	15–21	8–21		21–12	21–17		21–19	21–8	
20 Aug	09:00	Malaysia	0–3	Myanmar	0–2			0–2			0–2		
20 Aug	09:00	Malaysia	0–3	Myanmar	9–21	15–21		17–21	17–21		18–21	13–21	
20 Aug	09:00	Japan	1–2	Vietnam	0–2			2–1			0–2		
20 Aug	09:00	Japan	1–2	Vietnam	16–21	9–21		13–21	22–20	23–21	13–21	10–21	
20 Aug	15:00	Indonesia	1–2	Vietnam	2–0			1–2			0–2		
20 Aug	15:00	Indonesia	1–2	Vietnam	21–7	21–10		12–21	21–16	19–21	14–21	19–21	
20 Aug	15:00	Malaysia	3–0	Japan	2–1			2–0			2–0		
20 Aug	15:00	Malaysia	3–0	Japan	17–21	21–13	21–19	21–19	21–12		23–21	22–20	
21 Aug	09:00	Indonesia	3–0	Malaysia	2–1			2–0			2–0		
21 Aug	09:00	Indonesia	3–0	Malaysia	19–21	21–16	21–8	21–5	21–8		21–13	21–17	
21 Aug	09:00	Japan	0–3	Myanmar	0–2			0–2			1–2		
21 Aug	09:00	Japan	0–3	Myanmar	11–21	13–21		12–21	17–21		21–18	12–21	19–21

=== Knockout round ===
Semifinals
22 August
Thailand	2
Myanmar	0
22 August
Vietnam	0
South Korea	2

Gold medal match
22 August
Thailand	2
South Korea	0

==== Semifinals ====
Date	Time		Score		Regu 1			Regu 2			Regu 3		
Date	Time		Score		Set 1	Set 2	Set 3	Set 1	Set 2	Set 3	Set 1	Set 2	Set 3
22 Aug	10:00	Thailand	2–0	Myanmar	2–0			2–0					
22 Aug	10:00	Thailand	2–0	Myanmar	21–13	21–14		21–10	21–6				
22 Aug	10:00	Vietnam	0–2	South Korea	1–2			1–2					
22 Aug	10:00	Vietnam	0–2	South Korea	16–21	21–19	13–21	21–17	5–21	9–21			

==== Gold medal match ====
Date	Time		Score		Regu 1			Regu 2			Regu 3		
Date	Time		Score		Set 1	Set 2	Set 3	Set 1	Set 2	Set 3	Set 1	Set 2	Set 3
22 Aug	16:00	Thailand	2–0	South Korea	2–0			2–0					
22 Aug	16:00	Thailand	2–0	South Korea	21–16	21–7		21–14	21–15				
