= Dragon boat at the 2018 Asian Games – Men's 500 metres =

Men's 500 metres at the 2018 Asian Games
- Venue: Jakabaring Lake
- Date: 26 August 2018
- Competitors: 172 from 11 nations

Medalists
gold medal	Chinese Taipei
silver medal	China
bronze medal	Indonesia

The men's dragon boat (traditional boat race) 500 metres competition at the 2018 Asian Games was held on 26 August 2018.

== Schedule ==
All times are Western Indonesia Time (UTC+07:00)

Date	Time	Event
Sunday, 26 August 2018	10:20	Heats
Sunday, 26 August 2018	11:10	Repechage
Sunday, 26 August 2018	11:50	Semifinals
Sunday, 26 August 2018	14:10	Finals

== Squads ==
China	Chinese Taipei	Hong Kong	India
Jiao Fangxu; Gao Jiawen; Cai Wenxuan; Liu Xuegang; Du Zhuan; Yin Zhonghai; Zhang Zhen; Zeng Delin; Chen Guangqin; Su Bopin; Li Shuai; Chen Juntong; Ling Wenwei; Feng Guojing; Li Guisen; Zhou Guichao	Yin Wan-ting; Wu Wei-min; Wu Chun-chieh; Wu Chen-po; Tuan Yen-yu; Lin Sheng-ru; Lin Min-hao; Ho Chia-lin; Chuang Ying-chieh; Chou En-ping; Chou Chih-wei; Chien Cheng-yen; Chen Chou Yueh-hung; Chen Yu-an; Chen Tzu-hsien; Chang Sheng-huang	Samuel Cheng; Lau Hung Leong; Wan Kin Ming; Tang Chi Ho; Wu Yui Kwong; Li Cai; Leung Tsan; Lam Chun Fai; Sim Shing Ho; Ko Kit Wang; Choy Chun Yin; Wu Kaile; Wong Ka Ho; To Tsz Ching; Lee Yau Shun	Ravinder Singh; Arun Nandal; Dilip Singh Negi; Ankit Pachori; Parminder Singh; Hari Om Kurmi; Heisnam Nganba Meitei; Manjeet Singh; Kiran Singh Moirangthem; Manmohan Dangi; Bijender Singh; Suraj Singh Negi; Sachin Kumar; Abhay Singh; Satypal Tomar
Indonesia	Korea	Malaysia	Myanmar
Mochamad Taufan Wijaya; Anwar Tarra; Sutrisno; Syahrul Saputra; Dedi Saputra; Muhammad Yunus Rustandi; Andri Agus Mulyana; Poliyansyah; Erwin David Monim; Marjuki; Yuda Firmansyah; Arpan; Spens Stuber Mehue; Medi Juana; Muhammad Fajar Faturahman; Rio Akbar	Yang Chol-jin; Ri Yong-hyok; Paek Won-ryol; O In-guk; Kim Pu-song; Kim Jin-il; Jon Chung-hyok; Choe Kyong-uk; Lee Hyeon-joo; Yeom Hee-tae; Park Cheol-min; An Hyun-jin; Shin Dong-jin; Kim Yong-gil; Jung Hoon-seock; Shin Seong-woo	Shazwan Zainuddin; Lim Shu Quan; Lim Chiew Hock; Heng Yu Kai; Chee Soon Hwa; Cheah Mein Heng; Amran Sharif Hussain; Khoo Teik Chye; Saw Kooi Sheng; Lim Zi Kai; Leong Chong Hou; Tan Jian Yung; Low Kah Choon; Delon Koh; Ow Sze Khai; Rahmat Majid	Than Htay Aung; Kyaw Saw Aye; Saw Moe Aung; Si Thu Eain; Min Naing; Sai Min Aung; Htet Wai Lwin; Min Min Zaw; Aung Myo Thu; Sai Phyo Kyaw; Myo Ko Ko; Naing Naing Zaw; Zaw Min; Win Htein
Philippines	Singapore	Thailand	
Patricia Bustamante; Maribeth Caranto; Jonathan Ruz; Mark Jhon Frias; John Lester Delos Santos; Jerome Solis; John Paul Selencio; Roberto Pantaleon; Daniel Ortega; Reymart Nevado; Roger Masbate; Oliver Manaig; Hermie Macaranas; Ojay Fuentes; Franc Feliciano; Jordan De Guia	Terence Ong; Jarett Tan; Jermaine Ko; Toh Wei Jie; Belvin Tan; Jerry Tan; Shawn Tan; Ang Shaun Jun; Barath Kumar; Lu Wenda; Ling Hsih Hwa; Lim Wee Siang; Kong Peng Hui; Kiang Jian Xiang; Chong Xue Ian; Chng Khai Hung	Natthawat Waenphrom; Chaiyakarn Choochuen; Asdawut Mitilee; Santas Mingwongyang; Laor Iamluek; Ekkapong Wongunjai; Wasan Upalasueb; Phakdee Wannamanee; Nares Naoprakon; Phawonrat Roddee; Tanawoot Waipinid; Nattawut Kaewsri; Kasemsit Borriboonwasin; Pornchai Tesdee; Vinya Seechomchuen; Boonsong Imtim	

== Results ==
=== Heats ===
- Qualification: 1–3 → Semifinals (SF), Rest → Repechage (R)

==== Heat 1 ====
Rank	Team	Time	Notes
1	China	2:17.410	SF
2	Philippines	2:18.096	SF
3	Myanmar	2:18.616	SF
4	Singapore	2:20.658	R
5	India	2:24.806	R
6	Malaysia	2:26.544	R

==== Heat 2 ====
Rank	Team	Time	Notes
1	Thailand	2:15.400	SF
2	Chinese Taipei	2:15.610	SF
3	Korea	2:16.112	SF
4	Indonesia	2:18.884	R
5	Hong Kong	2:27.888	R

=== Repechage ===
- Qualification: 1–4 → Semifinals (SF), Rest → Tail race (TR)

Rank	Team	Time	Notes
1	Indonesia	2:19.674	SF
2	India	2:23.162	SF
3	Singapore	2:23.366	SF
4	Hong Kong	2:24.418	SF
5	Malaysia	2:25.714	TR

=== Semifinals ===
- Qualification: 1–3 → Grand final (GF), Rest → Tail race (TR)

==== Semifinal 1 ====
Rank	Team	Time	Notes
1	Thailand	2:17.315	GF
2	Philippines	2:17.841	GF
3	Myanmar	2:21.063	GF
4	Hong Kong	2:22.139	TR
5	India	2:22.505	TR

==== Semifinal 2 ====
Rank	Team	Time	Notes
1	Chinese Taipei	2:13.414	GF
2	Indonesia	2:14.768	GF
3	China	2:15.714	GF
4	Korea	2:16.416	TR
5	Singapore	2:36.462	TR

=== Finals ===
==== Tail race ====
Rank	Team	Time
1	Korea	2:20.837
2	Hong Kong	2:21.571
3	Singapore	2:22.873
4	India	2:24.965
5	Malaysia	2:25.677

==== Grand final ====
Rank	Team	Time
1st place, gold medalist(s)	Chinese Taipei	2:11.691
2nd place, silver medalist(s)	China	2:14.297
3rd place, bronze medalist(s)	Indonesia	2:15.727
4	Thailand	2:15.869
5	Philippines	2:16.521
6	Myanmar	2:20.467
