= Dragon boat at the 2018 Asian Games – Men's 200 metres =

Men's 200 metres at the 2018 Asian Games
- Venue: Jakabaring Lake
- Date: 25 August 2018
- Competitors: 172 from 11 nations

Medalists
gold medal	China
silver medal	Chinese Taipei
bronze medal	Thailand

The men's dragon boat (traditional boat race) 200 metres competition at the 2018 Asian Games was held on 25 August 2018.

== Schedule ==
All times are Western Indonesia Time (UTC+07:00)

Date	Time	Event
Saturday, 25 August 2018	10:20	Heats
Saturday, 25 August 2018	11:10	Repechage
Saturday, 25 August 2018	11:50	Semifinals
Saturday, 25 August 2018	14:10	Finals

== Squads ==
China	Chinese Taipei	Hong Kong	India
Jiao Fangxu; Gao Jiawen; Cai Wenxuan; Liu Xuegang; Du Zhuan; Yin Zhonghai; Zhang Zhen; Zeng Delin; Chen Guangqin; Su Bopin; Li Shuai; Chen Juntong; Ling Wenwei; Feng Guojing; Li Guisen; Zhou Guichao	Yin Wan-ting; Wu Wei-min; Wu Chun-chieh; Wu Chen-po; Tuan Yen-yu; Lin Sheng-ru; Lin Min-hao; Ho Chia-lin; Chuang Ying-chieh; Chou En-ping; Chou Chih-wei; Chien Cheng-yen; Chen Chou Yueh-hung; Chen Yu-an; Chen Tzu-hsien; Chang Sheng-huang	Samuel Cheng; Lau Hung Leong; Wan Kin Ming; Tang Chi Ho; Wu Yui Kwong; Li Cai; Leung Tsan; Lam Chun Fai; Sim Shing Ho; Ko Kit Wang; Choy Chun Yin; Wu Kaile; Wong Ka Ho; To Tsz Ching; Lee Yau Shun	Ravinder Singh; Arun Nandal; Dilip Singh Negi; Ankit Pachori; Parminder Singh; Hari Om Kurmi; Heisnam Nganba Meitei; Manjeet Singh; Kiran Singh Moirangthem; Manmohan Dangi; Bijender Singh; Suraj Singh Negi; Sachin Kumar; Abhay Singh; Satypal Tomar
Indonesia	Korea	Malaysia	Myanmar
Mochamad Taufan Wijaya; Anwar Tarra; Sutrisno; Syahrul Saputra; Dedi Saputra; Muhammad Yunus Rustandi; Andri Agus Mulyana; Poliyansyah; Erwin David Monim; Marjuki; Yuda Firmansyah; Arpan; Spens Stuber Mehue; Medi Juana; Muhammad Fajar Faturahman; Rio Akbar	Yang Chol-jin; Ri Yong-hyok; Paek Won-ryol; O In-guk; Kim Pu-song; Kim Jin-il; Jon Chung-hyok; Choe Kyong-uk; Lee Hyeon-joo; Yeom Hee-tae; Park Cheol-min; An Hyun-jin; Shin Dong-jin; Kim Yong-gil; Jung Hoon-seock; Shin Seong-woo	Shazwan Zainuddin; Lim Shu Quan; Lim Chiew Hock; Heng Yu Kai; Chee Soon Hwa; Cheah Mein Heng; Amran Sharif Hussain; Khoo Teik Chye; Saw Kooi Sheng; Lim Zi Kai; Leong Chong Hou; Tan Jian Yung; Low Kah Choon; Delon Koh; Ow Sze Khai; Rahmat Majid	Than Htay Aung; Kyaw Saw Aye; Saw Moe Aung; Si Thu Eain; Min Naing; Sai Min Aung; Htet Wai Lwin; Min Min Zaw; Aung Myo Thu; Sai Phyo Kyaw; Myo Ko Ko; Naing Naing Zaw; Zaw Min; Win Htein
Philippines	Singapore	Thailand	
Patricia Bustamante; Maribeth Caranto; Jonathan Ruz; Mark Jhon Frias; John Lester Delos Santos; Jerome Solis; John Paul Selencio; Roberto Pantaleon; Daniel Ortega; Reymart Nevado; Roger Masbate; Oliver Manaig; Hermie Macaranas; Ojay Fuentes; Franc Feliciano; Jordan De Guia	Terence Ong; Jarett Tan; Jermaine Ko; Toh Wei Jie; Belvin Tan; Jerry Tan; Shawn Tan; Ang Shaun Jun; Barath Kumar; Lu Wenda; Ling Hsih Hwa; Lim Wee Siang; Kong Peng Hui; Kiang Jian Xiang; Chong Xue Ian; Chng Khai Hung	Natthawat Waenphrom; Chaiyakarn Choochuen; Asdawut Mitilee; Santas Mingwongyang; Laor Iamluek; Ekkapong Wongunjai; Wasan Upalasueb; Phakdee Wannamanee; Nares Naoprakon; Phawonrat Roddee; Tanawoot Waipinid; Nattawut Kaewsri; Kasemsit Borriboonwasin; Pornchai Tesdee; Vinya Seechomchuen; Boonsong Imtim	

== Results ==
=== Heats ===
- Qualification: 1–3 → Semifinals (SF), Rest → Repechage (R)

==== Heat 1 ====
Rank	Team	Time	Notes
1	China	51.170	SF
2	Thailand	52.004	SF
3	Myanmar	53.524	SF
4	Malaysia	54.788	R
5	India	55.604	R
6	Singapore	56.718	R

==== Heat 2 ====
Rank	Team	Time	Notes
1	Chinese Taipei	50.707	SF
2	Indonesia	51.871	SF
3	Korea	52.991	SF
4	Philippines	53.125	R
5	Hong Kong	53.709	R

=== Repechage ===
- Qualification: 1–4 → Semifinals (SF), Rest → Tail race (TR)

Rank	Team	Time	Notes
1	Philippines	52.480	SF
2	Malaysia	54.408	SF
3	Hong Kong	54.434	SF
4	Singapore	55.700	SF
5	India	56.162	TR

=== Semifinals ===
- Qualification: 1–3 → Grand final (GF), Rest → Tail race (TR)

==== Semifinal 1 ====
Rank	Team	Time	Notes
1	Chinese Taipei	50.664	GF
2	Thailand	52.582	GF
3	Myanmar	54.826	GF
4	Malaysia	54.900	TR
5	Singapore	55.928	TR

==== Semifinal 2 ====
Rank	Team	Time	Notes
1	China	51.108	GF
2	Indonesia	51.896	GF
3	Philippines	52.594	GF
4	Korea	53.006	TR
5	Hong Kong	54.756	TR

=== Finals ===
==== Tail race ====
Rank	Team	Time
1	Korea	53.651
2	Hong Kong	54.077
3	Malaysia	54.955
4	Singapore	55.559
5	India	57.397

==== Grand final ====
Rank	Team	Time
1st place, gold medalist(s)	China	50.832
2nd place, silver medalist(s)	Chinese Taipei	51.358
3rd place, bronze medalist(s)	Thailand	52.622
4	Indonesia	53.360
5	Philippines	53.580
6	Myanmar	55.070
