= Dragon boat at the 2018 Asian Games – Women's 200 metres =

Women's 200 metres at the 2018 Asian Games
- Venue: Jakabaring Lake
- Date: 25 August 2018
- Competitors: 171 from 11 nations

Medalists
gold medal	China
silver medal	Indonesia
bronze medal	Korea

The women's dragon boat (traditional boat race) 200 metres competition at the 2018 Asian Games was held on 25 August 2018.

== Schedule ==
All times are Western Indonesia Time (UTC+07:00)

Date	Time	Event
Saturday, 25 August 2018	10:00	Heats
Saturday, 25 August 2018	11:00	Repechage
Saturday, 25 August 2018	11:30	Semifinals
Saturday, 25 August 2018	14:00	Finals

== Squads ==
China	Chinese Taipei	Hong Kong	India
Peng Xiaojuan; Dong Aili; Chen Chen; Wang Jing; Wang Li; Xu Fengxue; Zhong Yuan; Chen Xue; Tang Shenglan; Song Yanbing; Liang Liping; Huang Yi; Hu Chen; Bai Ge; Pan Huizhu; Li Lianying	Tsai Wen-ching; Tai Yin-chen; Rao Jhi-hsyuan; Pan Wei-shiu; Pai Chien-yu; Liu Yen-ting; Liu Jen-yu; Lin Yi-an; Lin Pei-hsuan; Lin Meng-jung; Lin Jia-min; Hung Wei; Chu Hsiang-ting; Chen Hsin-hui; Chou Ching-ting; Chen Pin-chun	Tang Man Lok; Wong Lap Man; Wendy Lau; Yoyo Sin; Inglid Li; Cheung Shuk Ting; Leung Po Shan; Yun Kit Yi; Ko Wai Man; Wu Cheuk Wai; Sophia Wong; Li Yan Yan; Peggy To; Tam Tsz Wai	Menu; Sushila Chanu Shoibam; Rajeshwari; Ramkanya Dangi; Manisha Rani; Neetu Verma; Yaiphabi Devi Oinam; Dimita Devi Toijam; Shamashakhi Devi Yumnam; Sanjana Singh; Sarju Devi Konjengbam; Nazis Mansoori; Manju; Kirti Kewat; Aarti Nath; Thajamanbi Chanu Phairembam
Indonesia	Korea	Malaysia	Myanmar
Ririn Puji Astuti; Since Lithasova Yom; Ramla B; Fazriah Nurbayan; Alvonsina Monim; Stevani Maysche Ibo; Masripah; Shifa Garnika Nurkarim; Christina Kafolakari; Selvianti Devi Hidayat; Raudani Fitra; Astri Dwijayanti; Emiliana Deau; Aswiati; Riana Yulistrian; Risti Ardianti	To Myong-suk; Yun Un-jong; Ri Hyang; Kim Su-hyang; Jong Ye-song; Ho Su-jong; Cha Un-yong; Cha Un-gyong; Hyun Jae-chan; Kang Cho-hee; Lee Ye-lin; Choi Yu-seul; Jang Hyun-jung; Byun Eun-jeong; Jo Min-ji; Kim Hyeon-hee	Zarina Zahid; Teyo Su Wern; Soo Wei Meng; Siew Sue Ann; Seak Chui Lai; Chanelle Liu; Lim Sook Fun; Lim Shuh Huey; Lesley Lim; Lim Jiy Ni; Sandra Lee; Lai Vui Ni; Peggy Lai; Priscilla Chew; Vivian Kuan; Chew Pei Lyn	Lin Lin Kyaw; Aye Aye Thein; Naw Aye Thin; Hla Hla Htwe; Su Wai Phyo; Kyi Lae Lae Wai; Win Win Htwe; Moe Ma Ma; Saw Myat Thu; Hay Mar Soe; Naw Arkar Moe; Thet Phyo Naing; Lin Lin Kyew; Phyu Phyu Soe; Khin Phyu Hlaing; Myint Myint Soe
Philippines	Singapore	Thailand	
Patricia Bustamante; Maribeth Caranto; Aidelyn Lustre; Bernadette Espena; Christine Mae Talledo; Rhea Roa; Theresa Mofar; Sharmane Mangilit; Glaiza Liwag; Rosalyn Esguerra; Lealyn Baligasa; Raquel Almencion; Apple Jane Abitona	Sherdyn Teng; Vanessa Tan; Denise Lindsey Ng; Eunice Thiam; Loh Peixuan; Diana Nai; Ng Ji Yan; Lew Si Hsien; Shanice Ng; Janice Yoong; Clara Siew; Wong Siong Yee; Chua Jia Min; Carmen Pang; Joyce Wee; Lim Xiaowei	Kanittha Nennoo; Nipatcha Pootong; Nipaporn Nopsri; Pranchalee Moonkasem; Wararat Plodpai; Wanida Thammarat; Prapaporn Pumkhunthod; Suphatthra Kheha; Patthama Nanthain; Praewpan Kawsri; Nattakant Boonruang; Mintra Mannok; Jariya Kankasikam; Arisara Pantulap; Saowanee Khamsaeng; Jaruwan Chaikan	

== Results ==
=== Heats ===
- Qualification: 1–3 → Semifinals (SF), Rest → Repechage (R)

==== Heat 1 ====
Rank	Team	Time	Notes
1	Myanmar	57.765	SF
2	Thailand	57.987	SF
3	Chinese Taipei	58.555	SF
4	Philippines	59.441	R
5	Hong Kong	1:01.557	R
6	Malaysia	1:02.829	R

==== Heat 2 ====
Rank	Team	Time	Notes
1	China	55.996	SF
2	Indonesia	57.264	SF
3	Korea	57.362	SF
4	Singapore	59.004	R
5	India	1:00.452	R

=== Repechage ===
- Qualification: 1–4 → Semifinals (SF), Rest → Tail race (TR)

Rank	Team	Time	Notes
1	Singapore	58.676	SF
2	Philippines	59.632	SF
3	India	1:00.238	SF
4	Hong Kong	1:01.210	SF
5	Malaysia	1:02.314	TR

=== Semifinals ===
- Qualification: 1–3 → Grand final (GF), Rest → Tail race (TR)

==== Semifinal 1 ====
Rank	Team	Time	Notes
1	China	56.787	GF
2	Thailand	57.405	GF
3	Chinese Taipei	58.513	GF
4	Philippines	59.213	TR
5	Hong Kong	1:04.735	TR

==== Semifinal 2 ====
Rank	Team	Time	Notes
1	Indonesia	56.065	GF
2	Korea	56.861	GF
3	Myanmar	57.099	GF
4	Singapore	59.035	TR
5	India	1:00.173	TR

=== Finals ===
==== Tail race ====
Rank	Team	Time
1	Singapore	59.102
2	Philippines	59.614
3	India	1:00.116
4	Hong Kong	1:01.214
5	Malaysia	1:02.748

==== Grand final ====
Rank	Team	Time
1st place, gold medalist(s)	China	56.161
2nd place, silver medalist(s)	Indonesia	56.817
3rd place, bronze medalist(s)	Korea	56.851
4	Thailand	57.571
5	Myanmar	58.071
6	Chinese Taipei	1:00.681
