= Dragon boat at the 2018 Asian Games – Women's 500 metres =

Women's 500 metres at the 2018 Asian Games
- Venue: Jakabaring Lake
- Date: 26 August 2018
- Competitors: 171 from 11 nations

Medalists
gold medal	Korea
silver medal	China
bronze medal	Thailand

The women's dragon boat (traditional boat race) 500 metres competition at the 2018 Asian Games was held on 26 August 2018.

== Schedule ==
All times are Western Indonesia Time (UTC+07:00)

Date	Time	Event
Sunday, 26 August 2018	10:00	Heats
Sunday, 26 August 2018	11:00	Repechage
Sunday, 26 August 2018	11:30	Semifinals
Sunday, 26 August 2018	14:00	Finals

== Squads ==
China	Chinese Taipei	Hong Kong	India
Peng Xiaojuan; Dong Aili; Chen Chen; Wang Jing; Wang Li; Xu Fengxue; Zhong Yuan; Chen Xue; Tang Shenglan; Song Yanbing; Liang Liping; Huang Yi; Hu Chen; Bai Ge; Pan Huizhu; Li Lianying	Tsai Wen-ching; Tai Yin-chen; Rao Jhi-hsyuan; Pan Wei-shiu; Pai Chien-yu; Liu Yen-ting; Liu Jen-yu; Lin Yi-an; Lin Pei-hsuan; Lin Meng-jung; Lin Jia-min; Hung Wei; Chu Hsiang-ting; Chen Hsin-hui; Chou Ching-ting; Chen Pin-chun	Tang Man Lok; Wong Lap Man; Wendy Lau; Yoyo Sin; Inglid Li; Cheung Shuk Ting; Leung Po Shan; Yun Kit Yi; Ko Wai Man; Wu Cheuk Wai; Sophia Wong; Li Yan Yan; Peggy To; Tam Tsz Wai	Menu; Sushila Chanu Shoibam; Rajeshwari; Ramkanya Dangi; Manisha Rani; Neetu Verma; Yaiphabi Devi Oinam; Dimita Devi Toijam; Shamashakhi Devi Yumnam; Sanjana Singh; Sarju Devi Konjengbam; Nazis Mansoori; Manju; Kirti Kewat; Aarti Nath; Thajamanbi Chanu Phairembam
Indonesia	Korea	Malaysia	Myanmar
Ririn Puji Astuti; Since Lithasova Yom; Ramla B; Fazriah Nurbayan; Alvonsina Monim; Stevani Maysche Ibo; Masripah; Shifa Garnika Nurkarim; Christina Kafolakari; Selvianti Devi Hidayat; Raudani Fitra; Astri Dwijayanti; Emiliana Deau; Aswiati; Riana Yulistrian; Risti Ardianti	To Myong-suk; Yun Un-jong; Ri Hyang; Kim Su-hyang; Jong Ye-song; Ho Su-jong; Cha Un-yong; Cha Un-gyong; Hyun Jae-chan; Kang Cho-hee; Lee Ye-lin; Choi Yu-seul; Jang Hyun-jung; Byun Eun-jeong; Jo Min-ji; Kim Hyeon-hee	Zarina Zahid; Teyo Su Wern; Soo Wei Meng; Siew Sue Ann; Seak Chui Lai; Chanelle Liu; Lim Sook Fun; Lim Shuh Huey; Lesley Lim; Lim Jiy Ni; Sandra Lee; Lai Vui Ni; Peggy Lai; Priscilla Chew; Vivian Kuan; Chew Pei Lyn	Lin Lin Kyaw; Aye Aye Thein; Naw Aye Thin; Hla Hla Htwe; Su Wai Phyo; Kyi Lae Lae Wai; Win Win Htwe; Moe Ma Ma; Saw Myat Thu; Hay Mar Soe; Naw Arkar Moe; Thet Phyo Naing; Lin Lin Kyew; Phyu Phyu Soe; Khin Phyu Hlaing; Myint Myint Soe
Philippines	Singapore	Thailand	
Patricia Bustamante; Maribeth Caranto; Aidelyn Lustre; Bernadette Espena; Christine Mae Talledo; Rhea Roa; Theresa Mofar; Sharmane Mangilit; Glaiza Liwag; Rosalyn Esguerra; Lealyn Baligasa; Raquel Almencion; Apple Jane Abitona	Sherdyn Teng; Vanessa Tan; Denise Lindsey Ng; Eunice Thiam; Loh Peixuan; Diana Nai; Ng Ji Yan; Lew Si Hsien; Shanice Ng; Janice Yoong; Clara Siew; Wong Siong Yee; Chua Jia Min; Carmen Pang; Joyce Wee; Lim Xiaowei	Kanittha Nennoo; Nipatcha Pootong; Nipaporn Nopsri; Pranchalee Moonkasem; Wararat Plodpai; Wanida Thammarat; Prapaporn Pumkhunthod; Suphatthra Kheha; Patthama Nanthain; Praewpan Kawsri; Nattakant Boonruang; Mintra Mannok; Jariya Kankasikam; Arisara Pantulap; Saowanee Khamsaeng; Jaruwan Chaikan	

== Results ==
=== Heats ===
- Qualification: 1–3 → Semifinals (SF), Rest → Repechage (R)

==== Heat 1 ====
Rank	Team	Time	Notes
1	Korea	2:24.044	SF
2	China	2:27.406	SF
3	Chinese Taipei	2:32.656	SF
4	Singapore	2:34.864	R
5	Hong Kong	2:38.620	R
6	Malaysia	2:38.884	R

==== Heat 2 ====
Rank	Team	Time	Notes
1	Indonesia	2:27.331	SF
2	Myanmar	2:29.899	SF
3	India	2:32.491	SF
4	Thailand	2:34.353	R
5	Philippines	2:35.201	R

=== Repechage ===
- Qualification: 1–4 → Semifinals (SF), Rest → Tail race (TR)

Rank	Team	Time	Notes
1	Thailand	2:33.810	SF
2	Singapore	2:34.882	SF
3	Philippines	2:36.408	SF
4	Malaysia	2:41.082	SF
5	Hong Kong	2:50.432	TR

=== Semifinals ===
- Qualification: 1–3 → Grand final (GF), Rest → Tail race (TR)

==== Semifinal 1 ====
Rank	Team	Time	Notes
1	Indonesia	2:27.926	GF
2	China	2:29.482	GF
3	Singapore	2:31.084	GF
4	Chinese Taipei	2:33.722	TR
5	Malaysia	2:44.702	TR

==== Semifinal 2 ====
Rank	Team	Time	Notes
1	Korea	2:27.203	GF
2	Myanmar	2:30.109	GF
3	Thailand	2:33.131	GF
4	India	2:33.987	TR
5	Philippines	2:38.841	TR

=== Finals ===
==== Tail race ====
Rank	Team	Time
1	India	2:35.384
2	Chinese Taipei	2:35.988
3	Philippines	2:38.360
4	Hong Kong	2:40.928
5	Malaysia	2:42.134

==== Grand final ====
Rank	Team	Time
1st place, gold medalist(s)	Korea	2:24.788
2nd place, silver medalist(s)	China	2:25.092
3rd place, bronze medalist(s)	Thailand	2:26.904
4	Indonesia	2:27.056
5	Myanmar	2:28.690
6	Singapore	2:32.026
