= Myanmar at the 2018 Asian Games =

- IOC code: MYA
- NOC: Myanmar Olympic Committee

in Jakarta and Palembang August 18 – September 2
- Competitors: 125 in 9 sports
- Flag bearer: Zaw Lwin Tun
- Medals Ranked 35th: Gold 0 Silver 0 Bronze 2 Total 2

Asian Games appearances (overview)
- 1951; 1954; 1958; 1962; 1966; 1970; 1974; 1978; 1982; 1986; 1990; 1994; 1998; 2002; 2006; 2010; 2014; 2018; 2022; 2026

Myanmar competed at the 2018 Asian Games in Jakarta and Palembang, Indonesia, from 18 August to 2 September 2018. Myanmar has participated in all the editions of the Asian Games except in the 1986 Games in Seoul. Volleyball player Zaw Lwin Tun, had been honored to be the flag-bearer for the country at the opening ceremony.

== Competitors ==
The following is a list of the number of competitors representing Myanmar that participated at the Games:

Sport	Men	Women	Total
Archery	2	4	6
Canoeing	18	16	34
Football	20	0	20
Rowing	9	4	13
Sepak takraw	11	12	23
Shooting	2	2	4
Taekwondo	3	1	4
Volleyball	12	0	12
Wushu	6	3	9
Total	83	42	125

== Medalists ==
The following Myanmar competitors won medals at the Games.

Medal	Name	Sport	Event	Date
Bronze	Kyu Kyu Thin; Khin Hnin Wai; Aye Aye Than; Nant Yin Yin Myint; Phyu Phyu Than; Su Mon Kyaw; Lairo Eng; Su Mon Aung; Nan Su Myat San; Ya Mong Zin; Nyein Chan Thu; Su Yee Htet	Sepak takraw	Women's team regu	22 August
Bronze	Nyein Chan Ko Ko	Wushu	Men's taijiquan and taijijian	22 August

Medals by sport
Sport	1st place, gold medalist(s)	2nd place, silver medalist(s)	3rd place, bronze medalist(s)	Total
Sepak takraw	0	0	1	1
Wushu	0	0	1	1
Total	0	0	2	2

Medals by day
Day	Date	1st place, gold medalist(s)	2nd place, silver medalist(s)	3rd place, bronze medalist(s)	Total
1	August 19	0	0	0	0
2	August 20	0	0	0	0
3	August 21	0	0	0	0
4	August 22	0	0	2	2
5	August 23	0	0	0	0
6	August 24	0	0	0	0
7	August 25	0	0	0	0
8	August 26	0	0	0	0
9	August 27	0	0	0	0
10	August 28	0	0	0	0
11	August 29	0	0	0	0
12	August 30	0	0	0	0
13	August 31	0	0	0	0
14	September 1	0	0	0	0
15	September 2	0	0	0	0
Total		0	0	2	2

== Archery ==
The Myanmar team will participate in both men's and women's team. There are 6 competitors from Myanmar.

Recurve

Athlete	Event	Ranking round		Round of 64	Round of 32	Round of 16	Quarterfinals	Semifinals	Final / BM	
Athlete	Event	Score	Seed	Opposition Score	Opposition Score	Opposition Score	Opposition Score	Opposition Score	Opposition Score	Rank
Htike Lin Oo	Men's individual	636	28	Kursanaliev (KGZ); W 6–0	Tang (TPE); W 7–1	Mohamad (MAS); L 1–7	did not advance			
Thidar Nwe	Women's individual	627	21	Bye	Kang (PRK); W 7–3	Zhang (CHN); L 0–6	did not advance			
Htike Lin Oo; Thidar Nwe	Mixed team	1263	14	—N/a	Bhutan; W 5–1	China; L 1–5	did not advance			

Compound

Athlete	Event	Ranking round		Round of 32	Round of 16	Quarterfinals	Semifinals	Final / BM	
Athlete	Event	Score	Seed	Opposition Score	Opposition Score	Opposition Score	Opposition Score	Opposition Score	Rank
Hla Hal San; Hlang Su Su; Sein Yah Yaw	Women's team	1997	11	—N/a	Malaysia; L 222–229	did not advance			
Zin Thu Rain Mhu; Yaw Sein Yah	Mixed team	1361	14	Bye	Chinese Taipei; L 148–156	did not advance			

== Canoeing ==
The Myanmar team participated in both men's and women's team.

=== Sprint ===
Athlete	Event	Heats		Semifinal		Final	
Athlete	Event	Time	Rank	Time	Rank	Time	Rank
Lwin Moe; Aung Zin Ko; Thar Nyi Khant; Myint Ko Ko	Men's K-4 500 m	1:41.628	5 QS	1:37.427	4	did not advance	

Qualification legend: QF=Final; QS=Semifinal

=== Traditional boat race ===
Men

Athlete	Event	Heats		Repechage		Semifinals		Final	
Athlete	Event	Time	Rank	Time	Rank	Time	Rank	Time	Rank
Than Htay Aung; Kyaw Saw Aye; Saw Moe Aung; Si Thu Eain; Min Naing; Sai Min Aung; Htet Wai Lwin; Min Min Zaw; Aung Myo Thu; Sai Phyo Kyaw; Myo Ko Ko; Naing Naing Zaw; Zaw Min; Win Htein	TBR 200 m	53.524	3 SF	Bye		54.826	3 GF	55.070	6
Than Htay Aung; Kyaw Saw Aye; Saw Moe Aung; Si Thu Eain; Min Naing; Sai Min Aung; Htet Wai Lwin; Min Min Zaw; Aung Myo Thu; Sai Phyo Kyaw; Myo Ko Ko; Naing Naing Zaw; Zaw Min; Win Htein	TBR 500 m	2:18.616	3 SF	Bye		2:21.063	3 GF	2:20.467	6
Than Htay Aung; Kyaw Saw Aye; Saw Moe Aung; Si Thu Eain; Min Naing; Sai Min Aung; Htet Wai Lwin; Min Min Zaw; Aung Myo Thu; Sai Phyo Kyaw; Myo Ko Ko; Naing Naing Zaw; Zaw Min; Win Htein	TBR 1000 m	4:44.252	2 SF	Bye		4:43.055	4 TR	4:52.621	7

Women

Athlete	Event	Heats		Repechage		Semifinals		Final	
Athlete	Event	Time	Rank	Time	Rank	Time	Rank	Time	Rank
Lin Lin Kyaw; Aye Aye Thein; Naw Aye Thin; Hla Hla Htwe; Su Wai Phyo; Kyi Lae Lae Wai; Win Win Htwe; Moe Ma Ma; Saw Myat Thu; Hay Mar Soe; Naw Arkar Moe; Thet Phyo Naing; Lin Lin Kyew; Phyu Phyu Soe; Khin Phyu Hlaing; Myint Myint Soe	TBR 200 m	57.765	1 SF	Bye		57.099	3 GF	58.071	5
Lin Lin Kyaw; Aye Aye Thein; Naw Aye Thin; Hla Hla Htwe; Su Wai Phyo; Kyi Lae Lae Wai; Win Win Htwe; Moe Ma Ma; Saw Myat Thu; Hay Mar Soe; Naw Arkar Moe; Thet Phyo Naing; Lin Lin Kyew; Phyu Phyu Soe; Khin Phyu Hlaing; Myint Myint Soe	TBR 500 m	2:29.899	2 SF	Bye		2:30.109	2 GF	2:28.690	5

== Football ==
Myanmar men's team were drawn in Group F at the Games.

Summary

Team	Event	Group Stage				Round of 16	Quarterfinal	Semifinal	Final / BM	
Team	Event	Opposition score	Opposition score	Opposition score	Rank	Opposition score	Opposition score	Opposition score	Opposition score	Rank
Myanmar men's	Men's tournament	North Korea; D 1–1	Saudi Arabia; L 0–3	Iran; W 2–0	4	did not advance				19

=== Men's tournament ===
Roster

The following is the Myanmar squad in the men's football tournament of the 2018 Asian Games.

Head coach: (Germany) Antoine Hey

No.	Pos.	Player	Date of birth (age)	Caps	Goals	Club
1	GK	Kyaw Zin Htet*	2 March 1987 (aged 31)			(Myanmar Football Federation) Yangon United
25	GK	Sann Satt Naing	4 November 1997 (aged 20)			(Myanmar Football Federation) Yangon United
2	DF	Htike Htike Aung	1 February 1995 (aged 23)			(Myanmar Football Federation) Shan United
3	DF	Zaw Min Tun* (captain)	20 May 1992 (aged 26)			(Myanmar Football Federation) Yangon United
4	DF	Win Moe Kyaw	1 February 1997 (aged 21)			(Myanmar Football Federation) Magwe
5	DF	Nanda Kyaw	3 September 1996 (aged 21)			(Myanmar Football Federation) Magwe
13	DF	Ye Yint Aung	26 February 1998 (aged 20)			(Myanmar Football Federation) Yadanarbon
15	DF	Soe Moe Kyaw	23 March 1999 (aged 19)			(Myanmar Football Federation) ISPE
23	DF	Hein Phyo Win	19 September 1998 (aged 19)			(Myanmar Football Federation) Shan United
6	MF	Hlaing Bo Bo	8 July 1996 (aged 22)			(Myanmar Football Federation) Yadanarbon
8	MF	Maung Maung Soe	6 August 1995 (aged 23)			(Myanmar Football Federation) Magwe
11	MF	Maung Maung Lwin	18 June 1995 (aged 23)			(Myanmar Football Federation) Yangon United
12	MF	Myat Kaung Khant	15 July 2000 (aged 18)			(Myanmar Football Federation) Yadanarbon
14	MF	Yan Naing Oo	31 March 1996 (aged 22)			(Myanmar Football Federation) Shan United
16	MF	Sithu Aung	16 October 1996 (aged 21)			(Myanmar Football Federation) Yadanarbon
19	MF	Htet Phyo Wai	21 January 2000 (aged 18)			(Myanmar Football Federation) Shan United
22	MF	Min Kyaw Khant	28 June 1995 (aged 23)			(Myanmar Football Federation) Yangon United
26	MF	Lwin Moe Aung	10 December 1999 (aged 18)			(Myanmar Football Federation) ISPE
9	FW	Dway Ko Ko Chit*	23 June 1993 (aged 25)			(Myanmar Football Federation) Shan United
10	FW	Aung Thu	22 May 1996 (aged 22)			(Football Association of Thailand) Police Tero

* Over-aged player.

Group F

Pos	Team	Pld	W	D	L	GF	GA	GD	Pts	Qualification
1	Iran	3	1	1	1	3	2	+1	4	Advance to knockout stage
2	North Korea	3	1	1	1	4	4	0	4	Advance to knockout stage
3	Saudi Arabia	3	1	1	1	3	3	0	4	Advance to knockout stage
4	Myanmar	3	1	1	1	3	4	−1	4	

Source: Asian Games 2018
Rules for classification: Group stage tiebreakers
15 August 2018
19:00 UTC+7

North Korea	1–1	Myanmar
Jang Kuk-chol 60'	Report	Maung Maung Lwin 44'

Wibawa Mukti Stadium, Cikarang
Referee: Masoud Tufaylieh (Syria)

17 August 2018
19:00 UTC+7

Myanmar	0–3	Saudi Arabia
	Report	Gharib 15' (pen.), 59' (pen.); Al-Banaqi 89'

Wibawa Mukti Stadium, Cikarang
Referee: Çarymyrat Kurbanow (Turkmenistan)

20 August 2018
16:00 UTC+7

Iran	0–2	Myanmar
	Report	Lwin Moe Aung 56'; Htet Phyo Wai 68'

Patriot Candrabhaga Stadium, Bekasi
Referee: Suhaizi Shukri (Malaysia)

== Rowing ==
Men

Athlete	Event	Heats		Repechage		Final	
Athlete	Event	Time	Rank	Time	Rank	Time	Rank
Ya Wai Tun; Hein Htet Naing; Aye Zaw Oo; Zaw Myo Thu; Saw Htet Eain Hlaing; Gaw Mu Tha; Nay Myo Hlaing; Wai Yan Moe; Pyae Phyo Kyaw	Lightweight eight	6:43.26	4 R	6:47.16	5	Did not advance	7

Women

Athlete	Event	Heats		Repechage		Final	
Athlete	Event	Time	Rank	Time	Rank	Time	Rank
Shwe Zin Latt; Nilar Win	Coxless pair	8:41.98	3 R	8:33.80	1 FA	8:18.39	5
Ei Phyu; Aye Thuzar; Shwe Zin Latt; Nilar Win	Coxless four	7:42.98	2 R	7:44.19	3 FA	7:33.17	5

== Sepak takraw ==
Men

Athlete	Event	Group Stage					Semifinal	Final	
Athlete	Event	Opposition score	Opposition score	Opposition score	Opposition score	Rank	Opposition score	Opposition score	Rank
Aung Thu Min; Zin Min Oo; Aung Myo Swe; Si Thu Lin; Thant Zin Oo; Aung Pyae Tun	Quadrant	Laos (LAO); L 0–2	Japan (JPN); L 1–2	China (CHN); W 2–0	Indonesia (INA); L 0–2	4	did not advance		
Wai Lin Aung; Zin Min Oo; Aung Myo Swe; Zaw Latt; Thant Zin Oo; Htet Myat Thu; Aung Pyae Tun; Zin Ko Ko; Aung Myo Naing	Team doubles	Thailand (THA); L 1–2	Laos (LAO); L 1–2	—N/a		3	did not advance		

Women

Athlete	Event	Group Stage					Semifinal	Final	
Athlete	Event	Opposition score	Opposition score	Opposition score	Opposition score	Rank	Opposition score	Opposition score	Rank
Khin Hnin Wai; Aye Aye Than; Nant Yin Yin Myint; Phyu Phyu Than; Nan Su Myat San; Ya Mong Zin	Quadrant	Laos (LAO); L 0–2	Indonesia (INA); L 1–2	South Korea (KOR); W 2–0	—N/a	3	did not advance		
Kyu Kyu Thin; Khin Hnin Wai; Aye Aye Than; Nant Yin Yin Myint; Phyu Phyu Than; Su Mon Kyaw; Lairo Eng; Su Mon Aung; Nan Su Myat San; Ya Mong Zin; Nyein Chan Thu; Su Yee Htet	Team regu	Indonesia (INA); W 2–1	Vietnam (VIE); L 1–2	Malaysia (MAS); W 3–0	Japan (JPN); W 3–0	2 Q	Thailand (THA); L 0–2	Did not advance	3rd place, bronze medalist(s)

== Shooting ==
Men

Athlete	Event	Qualification		Final	
Athlete	Event	Points	Rank	Points	Rank
Kyaw Swar Win	10 m air pistol	566	28	did not advance	
Ye Tun Naung	10 m air pistol	577	11	did not advance	

Women

Athlete	Event	Qualification		Final	
Athlete	Event	Points	Rank	Points	Rank
May Poe Wah	10 m air pistol	560	22	did not advance	
May Poe Wah	25 m pistol	574	16	did not advance	
Aye Myat Yadanar Oo	10 m air rifle	604.6	39	did not advance	

Mixed team

Athlete	Event	Qualification		Final	
Athlete	Event	Points	Rank	Points	Rank
Ye Tun Naung; May Poe Wah	10 m air pistol	752	13	did not advance	

== Taekwondo ==
Myanmar entered the competition with 4 athletes (3 men's and 1 women's).

Poomsae

Athlete	Event	Round of 16	Quarterfinal	Semifinal	Final	
Athlete	Event	Opposition score	Opposition score	Opposition score	Opposition score	Rank
Sun Shine	Men's individual	Abdurrahman Wahyu (INA); L 7.93–8.33	did not advance			

Kyorugi

Athlete	Event	Round of 32	Round of 16	Quarterfinal	Semifinal	Final	
Athlete	Event	Opposition score	Opposition score	Opposition score	Opposition score	Opposition score	Rank
Zaw Linn Htet	Men's −58 kg	Mohsen Rezaee (AFG)					
Aung Kyaw Kyaw	Men's −63 kg	Haroon Khan (PAK)					
Dhaysi Oo Julius	Women's −53 kg	Phannapa Harnsujin (THA)					

== Volleyball ==
Myanmar men's team were drawn in Pool C at the Games.

=== Indoor ===
Team	Event	Group Stage			Playoffs	Quarterfinals / Pl.	Semifinals / Pl.	Final / BM / Pl.	
Team	Event	Opposition Score	Opposition Score	Rank	Opposition Score	Opposition Score	Opposition Score	Opposition Score	Rank
Myanmar men's	Men's tournament	Kazakhstan; W 3–1	Japan; L 2–3	2 Q	Qatar; L 0–3	Thailand; L 1–3	Did not advance	India; W 3–2	11

==== Men's competition ====
Roster

The following is the Myanmar roster in the men's volleyball tournament of the 2018 Asian Games.

Head coach: Kyaw Swar Win

No.	Name	Date of birth	Height	Weight	Spike	Block	Club
2	San Nyunt Mg	8 June 1994	1.80 m (5 ft 11 in)	70 kg (150 lb)	310 cm (120 in)	295 cm (116 in)	(Myanmar) Asia World
4	Min Myo	24 September 1996	1.85 m (6 ft 1 in)	69 kg (152 lb)	320 cm (130 in)	306 cm (120 in)	(Myanmar) Asia World
5	Ya Htike Wai	22 April 1999	1.92 m (6 ft 4 in)	73 kg (161 lb)	315 cm (124 in)	300 cm (120 in)	(Myanmar) Asia World
6	Aung Phyo	11 September 1998	1.90 m (6 ft 3 in)	73 kg (161 lb)	300 cm (120 in)	290 cm (110 in)	(Myanmar) Asia World
7	Khwe Char Maung	14 August 1995	1.78 m (5 ft 10 in)	70 kg (150 lb)	323 cm (127 in)	307 cm (121 in)	(Myanmar) Asia World
9	Do Mae Ni Ko	4 June 1993	1.89 m (6 ft 2 in)	75 kg (165 lb)	304 cm (120 in)	295 cm (116 in)	(Myanmar) Asia World
11	Aung Thu (c)	10 July 1993	1.80 m (5 ft 11 in)	73 kg (161 lb)	321 cm (126 in)	303 cm (119 in)	(Myanmar) Asia World
12	Zaw Lwin Tun	21 April 1998	1.90 m (6 ft 3 in)	74 kg (163 lb)	310 cm (120 in)	290 cm (110 in)	(Myanmar) Asia World
13	Zaw Htet Aung	13 October 1999	1.76 m (5 ft 9 in)	77 kg (170 lb)	300 cm (120 in)	285 cm (112 in)	(Myanmar) Asia World
14	Zaw Win Hlaing	10 January 1995	1.80 m (5 ft 11 in)	75 kg (165 lb)	310 cm (120 in)	285 cm (112 in)	(Myanmar) Asia World
17	Thwin Htoo Zin	23 July 1996	1.92 m (6 ft 4 in)	73 kg (161 lb)	327 cm (129 in)	315 cm (124 in)	(Myanmar) Asia World
18	Nay Lin Aung Sr.	9 June 1993	1.78 m (5 ft 10 in)	66 kg (146 lb)	315 cm (124 in)	300 cm (120 in)	(Myanmar) Asia World

Pool C

Pos	Team	Pld	W	L	Pts	SW	SL	SR	SPW	SPL	SPR	Qualification
1	Japan	2	2	0	4	6	4	1.500	224	216	1.037	Classification for 1–12
2	Myanmar	2	1	1	4	5	4	1.250	199	191	1.042	Classification for 1–12
3	Kazakhstan	2	0	2	1	3	6	0.500	193	209	0.923	Classification for 13–20

Source: OCA

Date	Time		Score		Set 1	Set 2	Set 3	Set 4	Set 5	Total	Report
20 Aug	16:30	Kazakhstan	1–3	Myanmar	25–17	22–25	19–25	18–25		84–92	Report
24 Aug	09:00	Myanmar	2–3	Japan	21–25	25–17	19–25	25–21	17–19	107–107	Report
26 Aug	19:00	Qatar	3–0	Myanmar	25–21	25–18	25–20			75–59	Report
28 Aug	10:00	Thailand	3–1	Myanmar	26–24	37–35	22–25	25–15		110–99	Report
30 Aug	12:30	Myanmar	3–2	India	25–21	18–25	27–25	15–25	15–13	100–109	Report

== Wushu ==
The Myanmar wushu practitioners participated at the Games both in taolu and sanda events. Nyein Chan Ko Ko who competed in taijiquan and taijijian event clinched the first medal for the contingent after won a bronze by collecting 19.40 points.

Taolu

Athlete	Event	Event 1		Event 2		Total	Rank
Athlete	Event	Result	Rank	Result	Rank	Total	Rank
Kyaw Htet Han	Men's changquan	8.94	13	—N/a		8.94	13
Oo Thein Than	Men's nanquan and nangun	9.68	6	9.05	20	18.73	15
Nyein Chan Ko Ko	Men's taijiquan and taijijian	9.69	6	9.71	3	19.40	3rd place, bronze medalist(s)
Min Htet Khant	Men's taijiquan and taijijian	9.41	14	9.41	12	18.82	13
Sandy Oo	Women's changquan	8.70	9	—N/a		8.70	9
Thitsar Myint Aye	Women's nanquan and nandao	9.34	10	9.67	4	19.01	7
Eain Myat Noe	Women's taijiquan and taijijian	9.48	12	9.56	10	19.04	10

Sanda

Athlete	Event	Round of 32	Round of 16	Quarterfinal	Semifinal	Final	
Athlete	Event	Opposition score	Opposition score	Opposition score	Opposition score	Opposition score	Rank
Linn Thu Rain	Men's –56 kg	S Kumar (IND); L 0–2	did not advance				
Chit Ko Ko	Men's –60 kg	A Duiseyev (KAZ); L 1–2	did not advance				

Key: * TV – Technical victory.
