= P. S. Jeena =

Indian basketball player

P S Jeena
- Born: 9 January 1994 (age 32); Kalpetta, Wayanad
- Height: 179 cm (5 ft 10 in)

Palanilkumkalayil Skaria Jeena, known as P. S. Jeena (born 9 January 1994), is an Indian professional basketball player and practicing Christian who captains the India women's national basketball team. She is the first Indian to play in the Australian A Division Basketball League.

== Playing career ==
Jeena considers fellow Keralite basketball player Geethu Anna Jose as her role model. Jeena played basketball for Sports division, Kannur and she received her first international call-up in the U16 FIBA Asia Championship in 2009. Later she played college basketball for Krishnamenon College, Kannur] and for Kannur University. Jeena, who played for the state team at the age of 16, made her Indian team debut in 2009 in Asian basketball tournament. She had a "breakout moment" in her career in 2012 as the leader of India's junior women's team that took part in the U18 FIBA Asia Championship for Women in Johor Bahur, Malaysia. She was the second-highest scorer in the entire tournament with 20.2 points per game behind China's Wong K.Y and led the tournament in rebounds with 13.6 rebounds per game. She was instrumental in Kerala winning their first Senior Nationals in 2017. Jeena was signed by Australian basketball team Ringwood Lady Hawks in January 2019. She is the first Indian to play in the Australian A Division League. She works with the Kerala State Electricity Board as a senior assistant.

== Personal life ==
She was born in Pantipoyil, Bappanamala, Wayanad district to Palanilkumkala Scaria Joseph and Lizzie. Her husband is Jackson Johnson, a Chalakudy native who is a purchase engineer at KSB-MNC. They were married on July 4, 2020.

== Awards and honours ==
2020: National Senior Basketball Tournament - Most valuable player award
