= Saori Miyazaki =

Japanese basketball player (born 1995)

JX-Eneos Sunflowers
- Position: Shooting guard
- League: WJBL

Personal information
- Born: 27 August 1995 (age 31) Saitama, Japan

Saori Miyazaki (宮崎 早織, Miyazaki Saori; born 27 August 1995) is a Japanese professional basketball player for the Eneos Sunflowers of the Women's Japan Basketball League (WJBL). Miyazaki was a member of the Japan women's national basketball team at the 2020 Summer Olympics, winning a silver medal with the team.
