= Tamami Nakada =

Japanese basketball player

No. 33 – JX-Eneos Sunflowers
- Position: Center
- League: WJBL

Personal information
- Born: 21 December 1997 (age 28) Saitama, Japan
- Listed height: 1.83 m (6 ft 0 in)
- Listed weight: 74 kg (163 lb)

Career information
- WNBA draft: 2017: undrafted

Tamami Nakada (born 21 December 1997) is a Japanese professional basketball player for JX-Eneos Sunflowers and the Japanese national team.

She represented Japan at the 2021 FIBA Women's Asia Cup, where the team won the gold medal.
