= Wang Xuemeng =

Chinese basketball player

No. 8 – Xinjiang Magic Deer
- Position: Forward
- League: WCBA

Personal information
- Born: 20 October 1993 (age 33) Korla, Xinjiang, China
- Listed height: 6 ft 0 in (1.83 m)
- Listed weight: 176 lb (80 kg)

Career information
- WNBA draft: 2015: undrafted
- Playing career: 2011–present

Career history
- 2011–2020: Bayi Kylin
- 2021–2022: Shanxi Flame
- 2022–2025: Sichuan Yuanda
- 2025: Beijing Great Wall
- 2025–present: Xinjiang Magic Deer

Wang Xuemeng (Chinese: 王雪朦, born 20 October 1993) is a Chinese basketball player. She represented China at the 2018 FIBA Women's Basketball World Cup.
