= Saki Hayashi =

Japanese basketball player (born 1995)

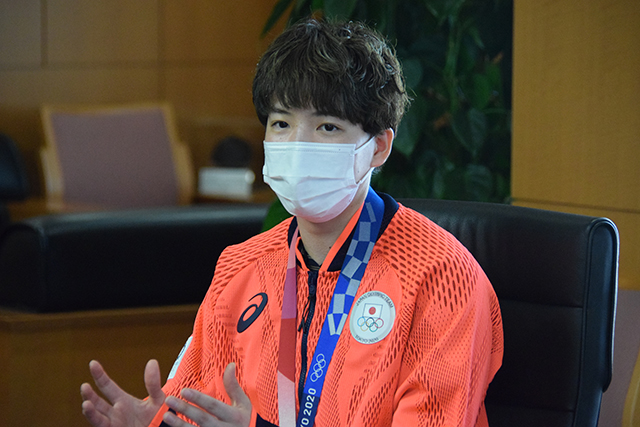
- Hayashi in 2021

No. 7 – JX Eneos Sunflowers
- Position: G/F
- League: Women's Japan Basketball League

Personal information
- Born: March 16, 1995 (age 31) Itoshima, Fukuoka, Japan
- Listed height: 5 ft 8 in (1.73 m)
- Listed weight: 148 lb (67 kg)

Career information
- High school: Seika Joshi (Hakata-ku, Fukuoka)
- College: Hakuoh University
- Playing career: 2017–present

Career history
- 2017–present: JX-Eneos Sunflowers
Medals
Women's basketball
Representing Japan
Olympic Games
Silver medal – second place	2020 Tokyo	Team
FIBA Women's Asia Cup
Gold medal – first place	2019 Bangalore
Gold medal – first place	2021 Jordan
Silver medal – second place	2023 Australia
Asian Games
Silver medal – second place	2022 Hangzhou
Bronze medal – third place	2018 Jakarta
Universiade
Silver medal – second place	2017 Taipei	Team

Saki Hayashi (林咲希, Hayashi Saki; born March 16, 1995), nicknamed Kiki, is a Japanese professional basketball player. She plays for Japan women's national basketball team. She competed at the 2020 Summer Olympics, winning a silver medal.

== Career ==
She plays for JX-Eneos Sunflowers of the Women's Japan Basketball League.
