= Park Ha-na (basketball) =

South Korean basketball player

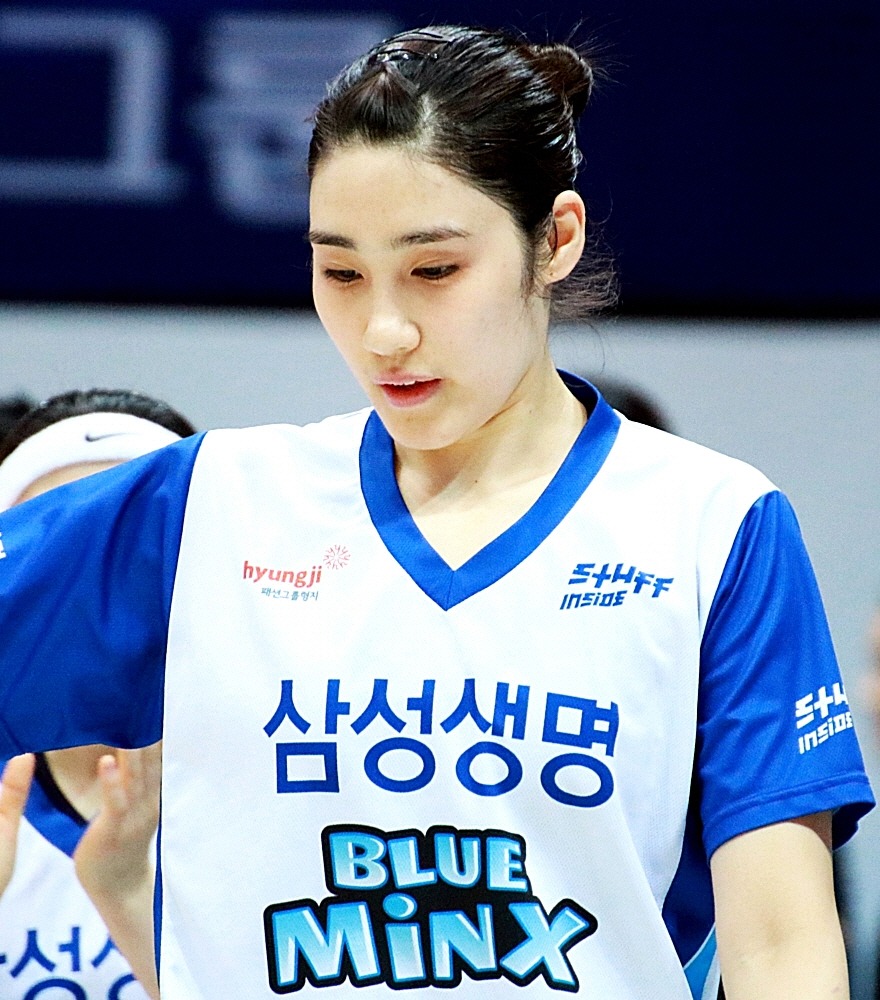
- Park in 2016

No. 1 – Yongin Samsung Blueminx
- Position: Guard
- League: WKBL

Personal information
- Born: 14 September 1990 (age 36) Gangneung, South Korea
- Listed height: 5 ft 9 in (1.75 m)
- Listed weight: 143 lb (65 kg)

Career information
- WNBA draft: 2012: undrafted
Medals
Women's basketball
Representing Korea
Asian Games
Silver medal – second place	2018 Jakarta	Team

Park Ha-na (born 14 September 1990) is a South Korean basketball player for Yongin Samsung Blueminx and the South Korean national team.

She participated at the 2018 FIBA Women's Basketball World Cup.
