= Choi Eun-sil =

South Korean basketball player

Choi I-saem (formerly Choi Eun-sil)
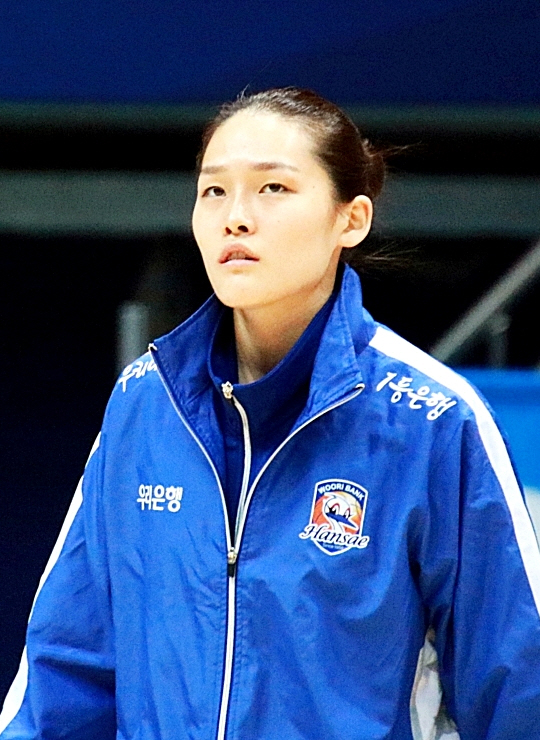
- Choi in 2016

No. 6 – Incheon Shinhan Bank S-Birds
- Position: Power forward
- League: WKBL

Personal information
- Born: 17 August 1994 (age 32) Cheongju, South Korea
- Listed height: 6 ft 0 in (1.83 m)
- Listed weight: 154 lb (70 kg)

Career information
- WNBA draft: 2016: undrafted
- Playing career: 2013–present

Career history
- 2013–2014: Chuncheon Woori Bank Hansae
- 2015–2024: Asan Woori Bank Wibee
- 2024–present: Incheon Shinhan Bank S-Birds
Medals
Women's basketball
Representing Korea
Asian Games
Silver medal – second place	2018 Jakarta	Team

Choi I-saem (Korean: 최이샘, also transliterated Choi Yi-sam, born 17 August 1994), formerly known as Choi Eun-sil (최은실), is a South Korean basketball player for Incheon Shinhan Bank S-Birds and the South Korean national team.

She participated at the 2018 FIBA Women's Basketball World Cup.
