= Liu Jiacen =

Chinese basketball player

No. 4 – Shanxi Flame
- Position: Center
- League: WCBA

Personal information
- Born: 30 March 1989 (age 37) Jixi, Heilongjiang, China
- Listed height: 6 ft 3 in (1.91 m)

Career information
- WNBA draft: 2011: undrafted
- Playing career: 2006–present

Career history
- 2006–2014: Heilongjiang Dragons
- 2014–2015: Jiangsu Phoenix
- 2015–2019: Heilongjiang Dragons
- 2019–2022: Shanxi Flame

Liu Jiacen (Chinese: 刘佳岑, born 30 March 1989) is a Chinese basketball player. She represented China at the 2018 FIBA Women's Basketball World Cup.
