= Kim Han-byul =

South Korean basketball player

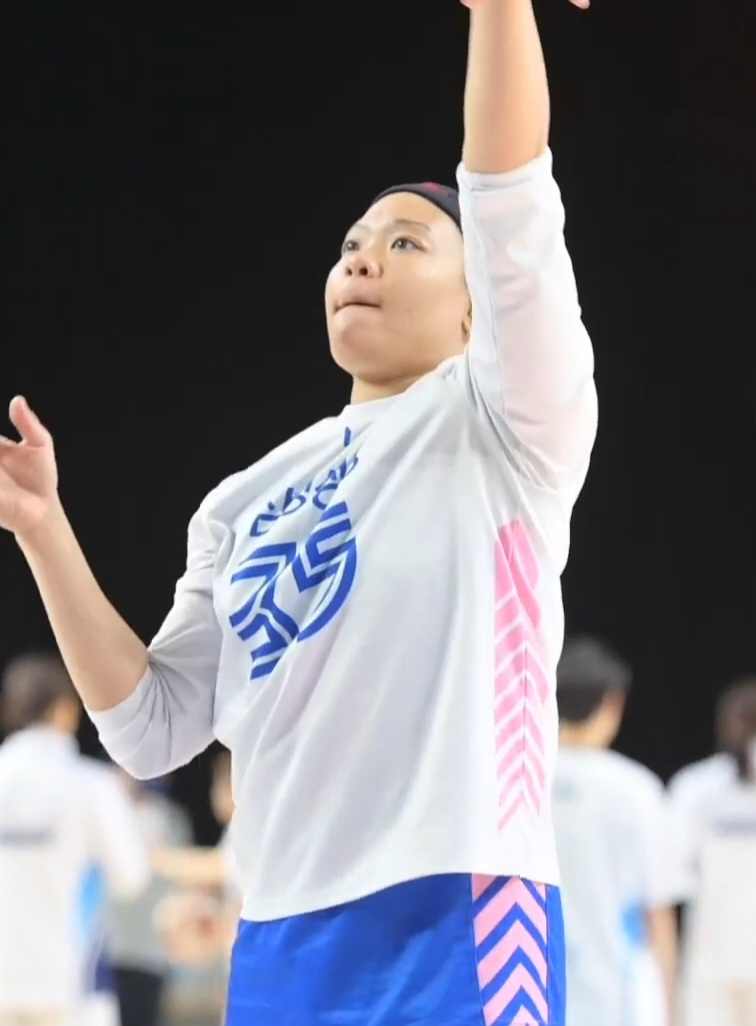
- Kim Han-byul

No. 35 – Yongin Samsung Blueminx
- Position: Swingman
- League: WKBL

Personal information
- Born: 21 November 1986 (age 39) Sacheon, South Korea
- Listed height: 5 ft 10 in (1.78 m)
- Listed weight: 169 lb (77 kg)

Career information
- College: Indiana (2009)
- WNBA draft: 2009: undrafted
Medals
Women's basketball
Representing Korea
Asian Games
Silver medal – second place	2018 Jakarta	Team

Kim Han-byul (born 21 November 1986) is a South Korean basketball player for Yongin Samsung Blueminx and the South Korean national team.

She participated at the 2018 FIBA Women's Basketball World Cup.
