= Lim Yung-hui =

South Korean basketball player

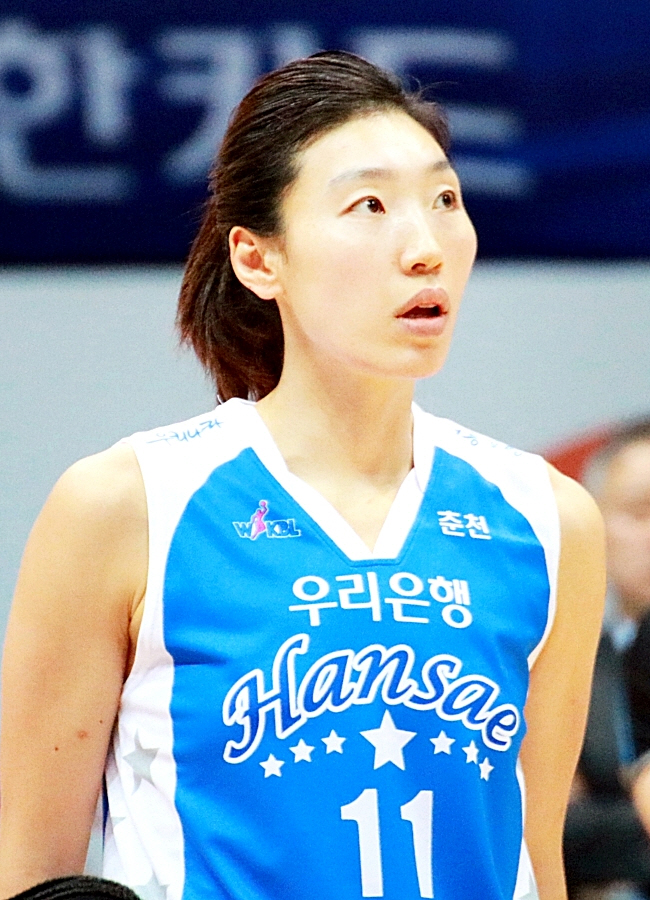
- Lin in 2016

No. 11 – Asan Woori Bank Wibee
- Position: Guard
- League: WKBL

Personal information
- Born: 29 May 1980 (age 46) Masan, South Korea
- Listed height: 5 ft 10 in (1.78 m)

Career information
- WNBA draft: 2002: undrafted
Medals
Women's basketball
Representing Korea
Asian Games
Silver medal – second place	2018 Jakarta	Team

Lim Yung-hui (born 29 May 1980) is a South Korean basketball player for Asan Woori Bank Wibee and the South Korean national team.

She participated at the 2018 FIBA Women's Basketball World Cup.
