= Rowing at the 2018 Asian Games – Men's lightweight eight =

Asian Games competition

Men's lightweight eight at the 2018 Asian Games
- Venue: Jakabaring Lake
- Date: 20–24 August 2018
- Competitors: 63 from 7 nations

Medalists
gold medal	Indonesia; Tanzil Hadid, Muhad Yakin, Rio Rizki Darmawan, Jefri Ardianto, Ali Buton, Ferdiansyah, Ihram, Ardi Isadi, Ujang Hasbulloh
silver medal	Uzbekistan; Islambek Mambetnazarov, Anatoliy Krasnov, Alisher Yarov, Shekhroz Hakimov, Shokhjakhon Najmiev, Zafar Usmonov, Otamurod Rakhimov, Dostonjon Bahriev, Dostonjon Khursanov
bronze medal	Hong Kong; Kenneth Liu, Chau Yee Ping, James Wong, Tang Chiu Mang, Lam San Tung, Yuen Yun Lam, Leung Chun Shek, Wong Wai Kin, Cheung Ming Hang

The men's lightweight eight competition at the 2018 Asian Games was held on 20–24 August at the JSC Lake.

== Schedule ==
All times are Western Indonesia Time (UTC+07:00)

Date	Time	Event
Monday, 20 August 2018	10:40	Heats
Wednesday, 22 August 2018	10:50	Repechage
Friday, 24 August 2018	10:50	Final

== Results ==
=== Heats ===
- Qualification: 1 → Final (FA), 2–4 → Repechage (R)

==== Heat 1 ====
Rank	Team	Time	Notes
1	Uzbekistan (UZB); Islambek Mambetnazarov; Anatoliy Krasnov; Alisher Yarov; Shekhroz Hakimov; Shokhjakhon Najmiev; Zafar Usmonov; Otamurod Rakhimov; Dostonjon Bahriev; Dostonjon Khursanov	6:13.30	FA
2	Hong Kong (HKG); Kenneth Liu; Chau Yee Ping; James Wong; Tang Chiu Mang; Lam San Tung; Yuen Yun Lam; Leung Chun Shek; Wong Wai Kin; Cheung Ming Hang	6:17.11	R
3	Korea (COR); Kang Ji-su; Kim Dong-hyeon; Ri Hyon-mong; Choe Myong-hak; Choe Kwang-guk; Jong Kwang-bok; Kwon Seung-min; Myeong Su-seong; Hong Hun	6:28.62	R
4	Myanmar (MYA); Ya Wai Tun; Hein Htet Naing; Aye Zaw Oo; Zaw Myo Thu; Saw Htet Eain Hlaing; Gaw Mu Tha; Nay Myo Hlaing; Wai Yan Moe; Pyae Phyo Kyaw	6:43.26	R

==== Heat 2 ====
Rank	Team	Time	Notes
1	Indonesia (INA); Tanzil Hadid; Muhad Yakin; Rio Rizki Darmawan; Jefri Ardianto; Ali Buton; Ferdiansyah; Ihram; Ardi Isadi; Ujang Hasbulloh	6:13.83	FA
2	India (IND); Akshat Tanwar; Jegan Sekar; Hardeep Singh; Sumit; Bhopal Singh; Jagvir Singh; Tejash Hanamant Shinde; Pranay Ganesh Naukarkar; Lakshman Rohith Maradapa	6:18.68	R
3	Vietnam (VIE); Đàm Đình Chiều; Bùi Quang Huy; Vũ Viết Tuấn; Hoàng Thanh Trung; Nguyễn Bá Nam; Trần Quang Tùng; Phạm Chung; Võ Như Sang; Trần Thị Kim Oanh	6:40.28	R

=== Repechage ===
- Qualification: 1–4 → Final (FA)

Rank	Team	Time	Notes
1	India (IND); Akshat Tanwar; Jegan Sekar; Hardeep Singh; Sumit; Bhopal Singh; Jagvir Singh; Tejash Hanamant Shinde; Pranay Ganesh Naukarkar; Lakshman Rohith Maradapa	6:15.62	FA
2	Hong Kong (HKG); Kenneth Liu; Chau Yee Ping; James Wong; Tang Chiu Mang; Lam San Tung; Yuen Yun Lam; Leung Chun Shek; Wong Wai Kin; Cheung Ming Hang	6:18.39	FA
3	Korea (COR); Kang Ji-su; Kim Dong-hyeon; Ri Hyon-mong; Choe Myong-hak; Choe Kwang-guk; Jong Kwang-bok; Kwon Seung-min; Myeong Su-seong; Hong Hun	6:29.49	FA
4	Vietnam (VIE); Đàm Đình Chiều; Bùi Quang Huy; Vũ Viết Tuấn; Hoàng Thanh Trung; Nguyễn Bá Nam; Trần Quang Tùng; Phạm Chung; Võ Như Sang; Trần Thị Kim Oanh	6:32.62	FA
5	Myanmar (MYA); Ya Wai Tun; Hein Htet Naing; Aye Zaw Oo; Zaw Myo Thu; Saw Htet Eain Hlaing; Gaw Mu Tha; Nay Myo Hlaing; Wai Yan Moe; Pyae Phyo Kyaw	6:47.16	

=== Final ===
Rank	Team	Time
1st place, gold medalist(s)	Indonesia (INA); Tanzil Hadid; Muhad Yakin; Rio Rizki Darmawan; Jefri Ardianto; Ali Buton; Ferdiansyah; Ihram; Ardi Isadi; Ujang Hasbulloh	6:08.88
2nd place, silver medalist(s)	Uzbekistan (UZB); Islambek Mambetnazarov; Anatoliy Krasnov; Alisher Yarov; Shekhroz Hakimov; Shokhjakhon Najmiev; Zafar Usmonov; Otamurod Rakhimov; Dostonjon Bahriev; Dostonjon Khursanov	6:12.46
3rd place, bronze medalist(s)	Hong Kong (HKG); Kenneth Liu; Chau Yee Ping; James Wong; Tang Chiu Mang; Lam San Tung; Yuen Yun Lam; Leung Chun Shek; Wong Wai Kin; Cheung Ming Hang	6:14.46
4	India (IND); Akshat Tanwar; Jegan Sekar; Hardeep Singh; Sumit; Bhopal Singh; Jagvir Singh; Tejash Hanamant Shinde; Pranay Ganesh Naukarkar; Lakshman Rohith Maradapa	6:15.00
5	Korea (COR); Kang Ji-su; Kim Dong-hyeon; Ri Hyon-mong; Choe Myong-hak; Choe Kwang-guk; Jong Kwang-bok; Kwon Seung-min; Myeong Su-seong; Hong Hun	6:18.72
6	Vietnam (VIE); Đàm Đình Chiều; Bùi Quang Huy; Vũ Viết Tuấn; Hoàng Thanh Trung; Nguyễn Bá Nam; Trần Quang Tùng; Phạm Chung; Võ Như Sang; Trần Thị Kim Oanh	6:27.80
