= Rowing at the 2018 Asian Games – Men's lightweight coxless four =

Men's lightweight coxless four at the 2018 Asian Games
- Venue: Jakabaring Lake
- Date: 19–23 August 2018
- Competitors: 28 from 7 nations

Medalists
gold medal	China; Xiong Xiong, Lü Fanpu, Zhao Chao, Zhou Xuewu
silver medal	Indonesia; Ali Buton, Ferdiansyah, Ihram, Ardi Isadi
bronze medal	Uzbekistan; Islambek Mambetnazarov, Shekhroz Hakimov, Otamurod Rakhimov, Zafar Usmonov

The men's lightweight coxless four competition at the 2018 Asian Games was held on 19–23 August at the JSC Lake.

== Schedule ==
All times are Western Indonesia Time (UTC+07:00)

Date	Time	Event
Sunday, 19 August 2018	11:00	Heats
Tuesday, 21 August 2018	10:00	Repechage
Thursday, 23 August 2018	11:10	Final

== Results ==
=== Heats ===
- Qualification: 1 → Final (FA), 2–4 → Repechage (R)

==== Heat 1 ====
Rank	Team	Time	Notes
1	Indonesia (INA); Ali Buton; Ferdiansyah; Ihram; Ardi Isadi	6:49.25	FA
2	Uzbekistan (UZB); Islambek Mambetnazarov; Shekhroz Hakimov; Otamurod Rakhimov; Zafar Usmonov	6:59.34	R
3	Hong Kong (HKG); Lam San Tung; Tang Chiu Mang; Leung Chun Shek; Wong Wai Kin	7:10.11	R
4	Korea (COR); Yun Chol-jin; Kim Chol-jin; Kim Su-min; Park Tae-hyun	7:12.74	R

==== Heat 2 ====
Rank	Team	Time	Notes
1	China (CHN); Xiong Xiong; Lü Fanpu; Zhao Chao; Zhou Xuewu	6:45.68	FA
2	India (IND); Bhopal Singh; Jagvir Singh; Tejash Hanamant Shinde; Pranay Ganesh Naukarkar	7:01.20	R
3	Vietnam (VIE); Hoàng Văn Đạt; Lê Thắng; Nguyễn Hữu Thành; Phan Mạnh Linh	7:19.47	R

=== Repechage ===
- Qualification: 1–4 → Final (FA)

Rank	Team	Time	Notes
1	Uzbekistan (UZB); Islambek Mambetnazarov; Shekhroz Hakimov; Otamurod Rakhimov; Zafar Usmonov	6:48.12	FA
2	India (IND); Bhopal Singh; Jagvir Singh; Tejash Hanamant Shinde; Pranay Ganesh Naukarkar	6:51.88	FA
3	Hong Kong (HKG); Lam San Tung; Tang Chiu Mang; Leung Chun Shek; Wong Wai Kin	7:02.74	FA
4	Korea (COR); Yun Chol-jin; Kim Chol-jin; Kim Su-min; Park Tae-hyun	7:08.12	FA
5	Vietnam (VIE); Hoàng Văn Đạt; Lê Thắng; Nguyễn Hữu Thành; Phan Mạnh Linh	7:17.24	

=== Final ===
Rank	Team	Time
1st place, gold medalist(s)	China (CHN); Xiong Xiong; Lü Fanpu; Zhao Chao; Zhou Xuewu	6:28.07
2nd place, silver medalist(s)	Indonesia (INA); Ali Buton; Ferdiansyah; Ihram; Ardi Isadi	6:31.08
3rd place, bronze medalist(s)	Uzbekistan (UZB); Islambek Mambetnazarov; Shekhroz Hakimov; Otamurod Rakhimov; Zafar Usmonov	6:38.40
4	India (IND); Bhopal Singh; Jagvir Singh; Tejash Hanamant Shinde; Pranay Ganesh Naukarkar	6:43.20
5	Hong Kong (HKG); Lam San Tung; Tang Chiu Mang; Leung Chun Shek; Wong Wai Kin	6:53.72
6	Korea (COR); Yun Chol-jin; Kim Chol-jin; Kim Su-min; Park Tae-hyun	6:59.61
