= Hong Kong at the 2018 Asian Games =

- IOC code: HKG
- NOC: Sports Federation and Olympic Committee of Hong Kong, China
- Website: https://hkolympic.org/

in Jakarta and Palembang August 18 – September 2
- Competitors: 580 in 37 sports
- Flag bearer: Vivian Kong Man Wai
- Medals Ranked 13th: Gold 8 Silver 18 Bronze 20 Total 46

Asian Games appearances (overview)
- 1954; 1958; 1962; 1966; 1970; 1974; 1978; 1982; 1986; 1990; 1994; 1998; 2002; 2006; 2010; 2014; 2018; 2022; 2026

Hong Kong competed at the 2018 Asian Games in Jakarta and Palembang, Indonesia, from 18 August to 2 September 2018. Hong Kong made its debut at the Asian Games in 1954 Manila, and the best achievement for the territory was in 2010 Asian Games held in neighboring Guangzhou, finishing with 8 gold, 15 silver and 17 bronze medals totaling 40 medals. At the previous edition in held 4 years later in Incheon, the total number of medals increased to 42, but the number of gold medals fell to 6. In Indonesia the performance of local athletes was satisfactory, improving the results obtained in 2010 and 2014 with 46 medals (8 golds, 18 silvers and 20 bronze) achieving the best results at the games.

== Medalists ==
The following Hong Kong competitors won medals at the Games.

Medal	Name	Sport	Event	Date
Gold	Jacqueline Siu	Equestrian	Individual dressage	23 Aug
Gold	Shek Wai Hung	Gymnastics	Men's vault	24 Aug
Gold	Leo Au	Squash	Men's singles	26 Aug
Gold	Lee Wai Sze	Cycling	Women's keirin	28 Aug
Gold	Lee Wai Sze	Cycling	Women's sprint	31 Aug
Gold	Cheung King Lok; Leung Chun Wing	Cycling	Men's madison	31 Aug
Gold	Annie Au; Joey Chan; Ho Tze-Lok; Lee Ka Yi	Squash	Women's team	1 Sep
Gold	Lee Ross Jones; Michael Coverdale; Max Woodward; Liam Herbert; James Paul Hood; Hugo Stiles; Alessandro Nardoni; Max Denmark; Benjamin Rimene; Eric Kwok; Cado Lee; Salom Yiu	Rugby sevens	Men's tournament	1 Sep
Silver	Juanita Mok	Wushu	Women's taijiquan	20 Aug
Silver	Nicholas Choi	Fencing	Men's individual foil	21 Aug
Silver	Stephanie Au; Jamie Yeung; Chan Kin Lok; Camille Cheng; Toto Wong; Rainbow Ip; Sze Hang Yu; Tam Hoi Lam	Swimming	Women's 4 × 100 metre medley relay	23 Aug
Silver	Chiu Hin Chun	Rowing	Men's lightweight single sculls	24 Aug
Silver	Cheung Ka Long; Nicholas Choi; Ryan Choi; Yeung Chi Ka	Fencing	Men's team foil	24 Aug
Silver	Tse Chun Hin; Lau Kwun Ho; Wong Kwan Yuen; Tseng Tak Hin; Mak Cheuk Yin; Wu Siu Hong	Bowling	Men's team of six	25 Aug
Silver	Max Lee	Squash	Men's singles	26 Aug
Silver	Ma Wing Yu; Li Yin Yin; Lee Wai Sze	Cycling	Women's team sprint	27 Aug
Silver	Zen Wei Peu; Wan Siu Kau; Lai Wai Kit; Mak Kwok Fai; Ng Chi Cheung; Lau Pik Kin	Contract bridge	Men's team	27 Aug
Silver	Charmian Koo; Flora Wong; Yeung Hoi Ning; Pearlie Chan; Ho Wai Lam; Ho Hoi Tung	Contract bridge	Supermixed team	27 Aug
Silver	Tang Chun Man; Tse Ying Suet	Badminton	Mixed doubles	27 Aug
Silver	Leung Chun Wing; Leung Ka Yu; Mow Ching Ying; Cheung King Lok; Ko Siu Wai	Cycling	Men's team pursuit	28 Aug
Silver	Leung Chun Wing	Cycling	Men's omnium	30 Aug
Silver	Yang Qianyu; Pang Yao	Cycling	Women's madison	31 Aug
Silver	Michael Cheng	Sailing	Men's RS:X	31 Aug
Silver	Hayley Chan	Sailing	Women's RS:X	31 Aug
Silver	Rafeek Kikabhoy; Ma Kwan Ching	Sailing	Mixed RS:One	31 Aug
Silver	Max Lee; Leo Au; Yip Tsz Fung; Henry Leung	Squash	Men's team	1 Sep
Bronze	Camille Cheng; Stephanie Au; Ho Nam Wai; Sze Hang Yu; Tam Hoi Lam	Swimming	Women's 4 × 100 metre freestyle relay	19 Aug
Bronze	Yuen Ka Ying	Wushu	Women's nanquan and nandao	20 Aug
Bronze	Liu Yan Wai	Fencing	Women's individual foil	20 Aug
Bronze	Low Ho Tin	Fencing	Men's individual sabre	20 Aug
Bronze	Vivian Kong	Fencing	Women's individual épée	21 Aug
Bronze	Cheung Ka Long	Fencing	Men's individual foil	21 Aug
Bronze	Ho Nam Wai; Camille Cheng; Katii Tang; Sze Hang Yu; Jamie Yeung; Natalie Kan; Chan Kin Lok	Swimming	Women's 4 × 200 metre freestyle relay	21 Aug
Bronze	Cyrus Chang; Lam Hin Chung; Terence Lee; Low Ho Tin	Fencing	Men's team sabre	23 Aug
Bronze	Leung Wing Yee	Cycling	Women's road time trial	24 Aug
Bronze	Lee Ka Man	Rowing	Women's lightweight single sculls	24 Aug
Bronze	Kenneth Liu; Chau Yee Ping; James Wong; Tang Chiu Mang; Lam San Tung; Yuen Yun Lam; Leung Chun Shek; Wong Wai Kin; Cheung Ming Hang	Rowing	Men's lightweight eight	24 Aug
Bronze	Chu Ka Mong; Kaylin Hsieh; Vivian Kong; Coco Lin	Fencing	Women's team épée	24 Aug
Bronze	Grace Lau	Karate	Women's individual kata	25 Aug
Bronze	Choi Wan Yu	Karate	Women's kumite 61 kg	26 Aug
Bronze	Lui Lai Yiu	Athletics	Women's 100 metres hurdles	26 Aug
Bronze	Doo Hoi Kem; Lee Ho Ching; Li Ching Wan; Ng Wing Nam; Minnie Soo	Table tennis	Women's team	28 Aug
Bronze	Ho Kwan Kit; Lee Ho Ching	Table tennis	Mixed doubles	29 Aug
Bronze	Mak Kwok Fai; Lai Wai Kit	Contract bridge	Men's pair	1 Sep
Bronze	Yeung Hoi Ning; Pearlie Chan	Contract bridge	Women's pair	1 Sep
Bronze	Bailee Brown; Law Leong Tim; Hilda Choi; Wong Tsz To	Triathlon	Mixed relay	1 Sep

Demonstration events

Medal	Name	Sport	Event	Date
Gold	Lo Tsz Kin	eSports	Hearthstone tournament	31 Aug

Medals by sport
Sport	1st place, gold medalist(s)	2nd place, silver medalist(s)	3rd place, bronze medalist(s)	Total
Athletics	0	0	1	1
Badminton	0	1	0	1
Bowling	0	1	0	1
Contract bridge	0	2	2	4
Cycling	3	4	1	8
Equestrian	1	0	0	1
Fencing	0	2	6	8
Gymnastics	1	0	0	1
Karate	0	0	2	2
Rowing	0	1	2	3
Rugby sevens	1	0	0	1
Sailing	0	3	0	3
Squash	2	2	0	4
Swimming	0	1	2	3
Table tennis	0	0	2	2
Triathlon	0	0	1	1
Wushu	0	1	1	2
Total	8	18	20	46

Medals by day
Day	Date	1st place, gold medalist(s)	2nd place, silver medalist(s)	3rd place, bronze medalist(s)	Total
1	August 19	0	0	1	1
2	August 20	0	1	3	4
3	August 21	0	1	3	4
4	August 22	0	0	0	0
5	August 23	1	1	1	3
6	August 24	1	2	4	7
7	August 25	0	1	1	2
8	August 26	1	1	2	4
9	August 27	0	4	0	4
10	August 28	1	1	1	3
11	August 29	0	0	1	1
12	August 30	0	1	0	1
13	August 31	2	4	0	6
14	September 1	2	1	3	6
15	September 2	0	0	0	0
Total		8	18	20	46

== Competitors ==
The following is a list of the number of competitors representing Hong Kong that participated at the Games:

Sport	Men	Women	Total
Archery	4	4	8
Artistic swimming	—	8	8
Athletics	12	11	23
Badminton	10	10	20
Baseball	24	—	24
Basketball	12	12	24
Bowling	6	3	9
Canoeing	18	14	32
Contract bridge	9	7	16
Cycling	13	9	22
Diving	1	3	4
Equestrian	2	6	8
Fencing	12	12	24
Field hockey	18	18	36
Football	20	20	40
Golf	4	3	7
Gymnastics	3	2	5
Handball	16	16	32
Judo	3	2	5
Karate	3	4	7
Paragliding	5	1	6
Roller sports	2	2	4
Rowing	11	6	17
Rugby sevens	12	12	24
Sailing	7	5	12
Shooting	2	2	4
Softball	—	17	17
Sport climbing	4	0	4
Squash	4	4	8
Swimming	17	16	33
Table tennis	5	5	10
Taekwondo	2	6	8
Tennis	4	4	8
Triathlon	3	2	5
Volleyball	18	18	36
Water polo	13	13	26
Wushu	4	4	8
Total	303	281	584

Demonstration events

Sport	Men	Women	Total
Canoe polo	6	6	12
eSports	10	0	10

== Archery ==
Recurve

Athlete	Event	Ranking round		Round of 64	Round of 32	Round of 16	Quarterfinals	Semifinals	Final / BM	
Athlete	Event	Score	Seed	Opposition score	Opposition score	Opposition score	Opposition score	Opposition score	Opposition score	Rank
Chui Chun Man	Men's individual	599	70	did not advance						
Lee Kar Wai	Men's individual	614	39	Pathairat (THA); L 4–6	did not advance					
Ma Hing Kin	Men's individual	623	33	Al-Mohanadi (QAT); W 6–0	Lee (KOR); L 2–6	did not advance				
Wan Tsz Kit	Men's individual	595	72	did not advance						
Chui Chun Man; Lee Kar Wai; Ma Hing Kin	Men's team	1836	17	—N/a	Saudi Arabia; L 1–5	did not advance				
Lam Shuk Ching	Women's individual	601	29	Awale (NEP); W 6–2	Tan (TPE); L 0–6	did not advance				
Tsui Chung Yan	Women's individual	518	62	did not advance						
Wang Chuek Ying	Women's individual	595	50	did not advance						
Wu Sze Yan	Women's individual	601	28	Mamatkulova (KGZ); W 6–5	Zhang (CHN); L 0–6	did not advance				
Lam Shuk Ching; Wang Chuek Ying; Wu Sze Yan	Women's team	1797	12	—N/a		Indonesia; L 2–6	did not advance			
Ma Hing Kin; Wu Sze Yan	Mixed team	1224	18	—N/a	Thailand; L 3–5	did not advance				

== Artistic swimming ==
Athlete	Event	Technical routine		Free routine		Total	Rank
Athlete	Event	Points	Rank	Points	Rank	Total	Rank
Haruka Kawazoe; Christie Poon	Duet	65.6146	10	67.7000	10	133.3146	10
Chan Hoi Lam; Cheung Ka Wing; Chew Ching Lam; Haruka Kawazoe; Kwok Kam Wing; Pang Tsz Ching; Christie Poon; Tze Yan Hei	Team	66.9680	9	70.5000	9	137.4680	9

== Athletics ==
Track & road events
Men

Athlete	Event	Heats		Semi-final		Final	
Athlete	Event	Result	Rank	Result	Rank	Result	Rank
Lee Hong Kit	100m	10.57	3 Q	10.76	7	—N/a	
Ng Ka Fung	100m	10.65	4 Q	10.59	7	—N/a	
Chan Chung Wang	110m hurdles	13.84	3	—N/a			
Chan Ka Chun	400m hurdles	53.94	7	—N/a			
Chan Ming Tai; Ng Ka Fung; Lai Chun Ho; Tsui Chi Ho	4 × 100 m relay	39.54	4 q	—N/a		37.48	7
Chin Man Kit	20 km walk	—N/a				1:43:43	9

Field events
Men

Athlete	Event	Qualification		Final	
Athlete	Event	Distance	Position	Distance	Position
Yeung Hong To	High jump	2.05	17	did not advance	
Ko Ho Long	Long jump	7.67	7 q	7.47	12
Chan Ming Tai	Long jump	7.11	17	did not advance	
Ricky Hui	Javelin throw	—N/a		67.47	11

Track & road events
Women

Athlete	Event	Heats		Semi-final		Final	
Athlete	Event	Result	Rank	Result	Rank	Result	Rank
Lam On Ki	100m	11.91	3 Q	11.99	7	—N/a	
Chan Pui Kei	100m	11.97	5	—N/a			
Chan Pui Kei	200m	24.92	7	—N/a			
Poon Hang Wai	200m	25.59	6	—N/a			
Lui Lai Yiu	100m hurdles	13.52	3 q	—N/a		13.42	3rd place, bronze medalist(s)
Shing Cho Yan	200m	14.48	4	—N/a			
Shing Cho Yan	marathon	—N/a				3:03:48	16
Shing Cho Yan	20 kilometres walk	—N/a				1:39:51	6

Field events
Women

Athlete	Event	Qualification		Final	
Athlete	Event	Distance	Position	Distance	Position
Yeung Man Wai	High jump	—N/a		1.80	5

== Badminton ==
Hong Kong sent a full team squad to compete in all seven events.

Men

Athlete	Event	Round of 64	Round of 32	Round of 16	Quarterfinals	Semifinals	Final	
Athlete	Event	Opposition score	Opposition score	Opposition score	Opposition score	Opposition score	Opposition score	Rank
Ng Ka Long	Singles	Bye	M A Rasheed (MDV); W (21–9, 21–10)	D Karunaratne (SRI); W (21–6, 21–14)	Chou T-c (TPE); L (18–21, 18–21)	did not advance		
Wong Wing Ki	Singles	Bye	S Kidambi (IND); W (23–21, 21–19)	Wang T-w (TPE); W (21–12, 16–21, 21–13)	J Christie (INA); L (11–21, 18–21)	did not advance		
Lee Chun Hei; Or Ching Chung	Doubles	—N/a	Ong Y S / Teo E Y (MAS); L (11–21, 18–21)	did not advance				
Chung Yonny; Tam Chun Hei	Doubles	—N/a	S Rankireddy / C Shetty (IND); L (12–21, 14–21)	did not advance				
Chung Yonny; Hu Yun; Lee Cheuk Yiu; Lee Chun Hei; Ng Ka Long; Or Chin Chung; Tam Chun Hei; Tang Chun Man; Wong Wing Ki; Yueng Ming Nok	Team	—N/a		Mongolia; WO	China; L 0–3	did not advance		

Women

Athlete	Event	Round of 32	Round of 16	Quarterfinals	Semifinals	Final	
Athlete	Event	Opposition score	Opposition score	Opposition score	Opposition score	Opposition score	Rank
Cheung Ngan Yi	Singles	R A Haebesh (KSA); W (21–2, 21–5)	Tai T-y (TPE); L (9–21, 14–21)	did not advance			
Yip Pui Yin	Singles	S Akram (PAK); W (21–7, 21–2)	Chen Y (CHN); L (20–22, 17–21)	did not advance			
Ng Wing Yung; Yeung Nga Ting	Doubles	A Ponnappa / N S Reddy (IND); L (16–21, 15–21)	did not advance				
Ng Tsz Yau; Yuen Sin Ying	Doubles	Kim H-r / Kong H-y (KOR); L (10–21, 17–21)	did not advance				
Chau Hoi Wah; Cheung Ngan Yi; Leung Yuet Yee; Ng Tsz Yau; Ng Wing Yung; Tse Ying Suet; Yueng Nga Ting; Yeung Sum Yee; Yip Pui Yin; Yuen Sin Ying	Team	—N/a	Indonesia; L 0–3	did not advance			

Mixed

Athlete	Event	Round of 32	Round of 16	Quarterfinals	Semifinals	Final	
Athlete	Event	Opposition score	Opposition score	Opposition score	Opposition score	Opposition score	Rank
Tang Chun Man; Tse Ying Suet	Mixed	Bye	Goh S H / S J Lai (MAS); W (14–21, 21–11, 22–20)	D Puavaranukroh / S Taerattanachai (THA) (21–13, 22–20)	Wang YL / Huang DP (CHN); W (22–20, 19–21, 23–21)	Zheng SW / Huang YQ (CHN); L (8–21, 15–21)	2nd place, silver medalist(s)
Lee Chun Hei; Chau Hoi Wah	Mixed	D Dhami / J Gurung (NEP); W (21–11, 21–11)	Chan P S / Goh L Y (MAS); W (21–17, 19–21, 28–26)	/T Ahmad; L Natsir (INA); L (15–21, 21–17, 16–21)	did not advance		

== Baseball ==
Hong Kong participated in the baseball competition at the Games, and the team were drawn in the group B alongside Indonesia, South Korea and Chinese Taipei.

Team	Event	Round 1		Round 2		Super / Consolation		Final / BM	
Team	Event	Oppositions scores	Rank	Oppositions scores	Rank	Oppositions scores	Rank	Opposition score	Rank
Hong Kong men's	Men's tournament	Bye		Indonesia: W 7–4; Chinese Taipei: L 1–16 (F/5); South Korea: L 3–21	3	Thailand: W 5–4; Pakistan: L 2–12 (F/7)	2	Did not advance	6

Roster

The following is the Hong Kong roster for the men's baseball tournament of the 2018 Asian Games.

Manager
Au Hok Leung

Coaches
Thomas John Valcke
Cheung On Kiu
Pat Ahearne

Pos.	No.	Player	Date of birth (age)	Bats	Throws	Club
P	1	Connor Kwok	4 December 1999 (aged 18)			
OF	2	Chan Cheuk Kiu	24 June 1994 (aged 24)			
IF	3	Ashley Ma	15 January 1993 (aged 25)			
OF	7	Andy Lo	14 May 1995 (aged 23)			
P	9	Gordon Chau	23 June 1995 (aged 23)			
IF	13	Pun Wo Sau	27 May 1995 (aged 23)			
P	14	Leung Chung Hei	22 June 1995 (aged 23)			
P	17	Lam Lai Him	10 May 1999 (aged 19)			
IF	18	Cheng Hoi Ting	25 September 1998 (aged 19)			
P	22	Yeung Kun Hin	22 July 1991 (aged 27)			
C	24	Michael Yu	24 May 1997 (aged 21)			
IF	25	Matthew Andrew Holliday	18 September 1995 (aged 22)			
C	33	Benny Tam	30 May 1992 (aged 26)			
P	38	Sam Leung	28 December 1994 (aged 23)			
P	40	Yuen Chun Pang	16 January 1996 (aged 22)			
P	44	Mok Wing Tung	7 November 1996 (aged 21)			
P	48	Li Wing Sing	24 June 1993 (aged 25)			
IF	52	Wu Tsz Tung	16 April 1992 (aged 26)			
C	56	Leung Ho Nam	13 September 1991 (aged 26)			
IF	57	Tsang Kin Chung	5 August 1982 (aged 36)			
OF	59	Yung Tsun Wai	7 May 1992 (aged 26)			
P	64	Kenneth Chiu	27 July 1991 (aged 27)			
OF	66	Ng Yau Pang	19 August 1994 (aged 24)			
IF	96	Liu Ho Yin	7 December 1993 (aged 24)			

Round 2 – Group B

Pos	Team	Pld	W	L	RF	RA	PCT	GB	Qualification
1	Chinese Taipei	3	3	0	33	2	1.000	—	Super round
2	South Korea	3	2	1	37	5	.667	1	Super round
3	Hong Kong	3	1	2	11	41	.333	2	Consolation round
4	Indonesia	3	0	3	4	37	.000	3	Consolation round

Source: OCA

26 August; 12:00	Indonesia	4–7	Hong Kong	Gelora Bung Karno Baseball Field, Jakarta; Attendance: 500; Umpires: Sung Yu-meng (TPE)
26 August; 12:00	LP: Chindy Patria Yudharana	Boxscore	WP: Sam Leung; Sv: Matthew Andrew Holliday	Gelora Bung Karno Baseball Field, Jakarta; Attendance: 500; Umpires: Sung Yu-meng (TPE)
26 August; 12:00		Boxscore	HR: Matthew Andrew Holliday (1)	Gelora Bung Karno Baseball Field, Jakarta; Attendance: 500; Umpires: Sung Yu-meng (TPE)

Team	1	2	3	4	5	6	7	8	9	R	H	E
Hong Kong	0	2	0	0	0	0	2	2	1	7	11	1
Indonesia	0	0	0	0	2	1	0	1	0	4	5	1

27 August; 12:00	Chinese Taipei	16–1 (F/5)	Hong Kong	Gelora Bung Karno Baseball Field, Jakarta; Attendance: 100; Umpires: Park Hi-young (KOR)
27 August; 12:00	WP: Lin Cheng-hsien	Boxscore	LP: Leung Chung Hei	Gelora Bung Karno Baseball Field, Jakarta; Attendance: 100; Umpires: Park Hi-young (KOR)

Team	1	2	3	4	5	6	7	8	9	R	H	E
Hong Kong	0	0	0	1	0	—	—	—	—	1	2	0
Chinese Taipei	0	2	8	3	3	—	—	—	—	16	17	0

28 August; 12:00	Hong Kong	3–21	South Korea	Gelora Bung Karno Baseball Field, Jakarta; Attendance: 600; Umpires: Huang Jun-jeh (TPE)
28 August; 12:00	LP: Yeung Kun Hin	Boxscore	WP: Lee Yong-chan	Gelora Bung Karno Baseball Field, Jakarta; Attendance: 600; Umpires: Huang Jun-jeh (TPE)
28 August; 12:00	HR: Matthew Andrew Holliday (1)	Boxscore	HR: Lee Jung-hoo (2), Hwang Jae-gyun (1), Lee Jae-won (1), Park Byung-ho (1)	Gelora Bung Karno Baseball Field, Jakarta; Attendance: 600; Umpires: Huang Jun-jeh (TPE)

Team	1	2	3	4	5	6	7	8	9	R	H	E
South Korea	1	0	1	3	0	3	0	3	10	21	16	0
Hong Kong	0	1	0	1	0	1	0	0	0	3	8	3

Consolation round

Pos	Team	Pld	W	L	RF	RA	PCT	GB
1	Pakistan	3	3	0	30	5	1.000	—
2	Hong Kong	3	2	1	14	20	.667	1
3	Indonesia	3	1	2	18	28	.333	2
4	Thailand	3	0	3	16	25	.000	3

Source: OCA

30 August; 14:00	Hong Kong	5–4	Thailand	Rawamangun Baseball Field, Jakarta; Attendance: 100; Umpires: Sandy Kusuma (INA)
30 August; 14:00	WP: Sam Leung	Boxscore	LP: Siraphop Nadee	Rawamangun Baseball Field, Jakarta; Attendance: 100; Umpires: Sandy Kusuma (INA)
30 August; 14:00	HR: Benny Tam (1)	Boxscore	HR: Joe Daru (1)	Rawamangun Baseball Field, Jakarta; Attendance: 100; Umpires: Sandy Kusuma (INA)

Team	1	2	3	4	5	6	7	8	9	R	H	E
Thailand	0	2	0	0	2	0	0	0	0	4	8	3
Hong Kong	0	0	0	0	3	1	0	0	1	5	10	1

31 August; 8:00	Pakistan	12–2 (F/7)	Hong Kong	Rawamangun Baseball Field, Jakarta; Attendance: 75; Umpires: Yoshinori Koide (JPN)
31 August; 8:00	WP: Ihsanullah	Boxscore	LP: Leung Chung Hei	Rawamangun Baseball Field, Jakarta; Attendance: 75; Umpires: Yoshinori Koide (JPN)

Team	1	2	3	4	5	6	7	8	9	R	H	E
Hong Kong	0	0	1	0	0	0	1	—	—	2	6	3
Pakistan	1	1	0	4	0	1	5	—	—	12	15	0

== Basketball ==
Summary

Team	Event	Group Stage					Quarterfinal	Semifinals / Pl.	Final / BM / Pl.	
Team	Event	Opposition score	Opposition score	Opposition score	Opposition score	Rank	Opposition score	Opposition score	Opposition score	Rank
Hong Kong men's	Men's tournament	—N/a	Qatar; L 80−90	Chinese Taipei; L 67−98	Japan; L 82−88	4	did not advance			12
Hong Kong women's	Women's tournament	Japan; L 44−121	Mongolia; L 79−83	Thailand; L 76−86	China; L 31−123	5	did not advance			10

=== 5x5 basketball ===
Hong Kong men's and women's basketball team participate at the competition, drawn in group C for the men's and in group Y for the women's team.

==== Men's tournament ====
Roster

The following is the Hong Kong roster in the men's basketball tournament of the 2018 Asian Games.

Hong Kong men's national basketball team - 2018 Asian Games roster
Players
Coaches

Pos.	No.	Name	Age – Date of birth	Height	Club	Ctr.
G	2	Cheng Ho Hang	25 – 10 February 1993	1.75 m (5 ft 9 in)	SCAA	(Hong Kong)
SF	6	Leung Shiu Wah	24 – 25 March 1994	1.91 m (6 ft 3 in)	SCAA	(Hong Kong)
G	7	Lam Hoi Kwong	29 – 28 April 1989	1.84 m (6 ft 0 in)	SCAA	(Hong Kong)
G	8	Lau Tsz Lai	27 – 4 November 1990	1.84 m (6 ft 0 in)	Eastern	(Hong Kong)
PG	10	Ricky Yang	20 – 28 July 1998	1.80 m (5 ft 11 in)	BFL Dragons	(Hong Kong)
F	11	Cheng Kam Hing	32 – 12 October 1985	1.88 m (6 ft 2 in)	HKPA	(Hong Kong)
F	16	Adam Xu	25 – 16 February 1993	1.96 m (6 ft 5 in)	Eastern	(Hong Kong)
SG	22	Chow Ka Kui	30 – 7 January 1988	1.79 m (5 ft 10 in)	Tycoon	(Hong Kong)
G	27	Tsai Choi Kwan	23 – 16 March 1995	1.85 m (6 ft 1 in)	SCAA	(Hong Kong)
F	30	Wu Cheuk Pan	24 – 23 November 1993	2.03 m (6 ft 8 in)	Eastern	(Hong Kong)
C	34	Szeto Wai Kit	31 – 6 August 1987	1.95 m (6 ft 5 in)	Fukien	(Hong Kong)
SF	41	Au-Yeung Wai Kong	29 – 7 February 1989	1.83 m (6 ft 0 in)	Tycoon	(Hong Kong)

Head coach

- (Hong Kong) On Hing King

Assistant coach(es)

- (Hong Kong) Chiu Wing Leung

Legend

- (C) Team captain
- (NP) Naturalized player
- Club - describes last
  club before the tournament
- Age - describes age
  on 14 August 2018

Group C

Pos	Team	Pld	W	L	PF	PA	PD	Pts	Qualification
1	Chinese Taipei	3	3	0	252	202	+50	6	Quarterfinals
2	Japan	3	2	1	235	224	+11	5	Quarterfinals
3	Qatar	3	1	2	231	245	−14	4	
4	Hong Kong	3	0	3	229	276	−47	3	

Source: OCA

14 August
16:00

Hong Kong	80–90	Qatar
Scoring by quarter: 16–27, 16–24, 16–22, 32–17
Pts: Lau 21; Rebs: Szeto 13; Asts: Szeto 7		Pts: Suliman 19; Rebs: Yousuf 10; Asts: Suliman 7

Gelora Bung Karno Basketball Hall, Jakarta
Referees: Kim Jong-kuk (KOR), Haryanto Sutaryo (INA), Imran Ali Baig (IND)

20 August
16:00

Chinese Taipei	98–67	Hong Kong
Scoring by quarter: 24–13, 21–10, 30–19, 23–25
Pts: Liu 21; Rebs: Liu 8 Asts: Chou Y. 5		Pts: Xu 16; Rebs: Szeto 8 Asts: Szeto 5

Gelora Bung Karno Basketball Hall, Jakarta
Referees: Harja Jaladri (INA), Yevgeniy Mikheyev (KAZ), Zhu Duan (CHN)

22 August
16:00

Japan	88–82	Hong Kong
Scoring by quarter: 22–19, 20–22, 28–20, 18–21
Pts: Ota 19; Rebs: Ota 10; Asts: Vendrame 8		Pts: Leung 35; Rebs: Szeto 16; Asts: Yang 6

Gelora Bung Karno Basketball Hall, Jakarta
Referees: Budi Marfan (INA), Johan Christiana (INA), Haryanto Sutaryo (INA)

==== Women's tournament ====
Roster

The following is the Hong Kong roster in the women's basketball tournament of the 2018 Asian Games.

Hong Kong women's national basketball team - 2018 Asian Games roster
Players
Coaches

Pos.	No.	Name	Age – Date of birth	Height	Club	Ctr.
C	00	Ma Tan Fung	17 – 19 October 2000	1.83 m (6 ft 0 in)	On Bong	(Hong Kong)
G	1	Kwong Hiu Lam	23 – 7 December 1994	1.63 m (5 ft 4 in)	SCAA	(Hong Kong)
G	2	Ezra Wong	26 – 22 April 1992	1.60 m (5 ft 3 in)	7.Up	(Hong Kong)
G/F	6	Cheuk Ting (C)	29 – 9 May 1989	1.67 m (5 ft 6 in)	Fukien	(Hong Kong)
F	12	Wong Ki Ki	29 – 9 December 1988	1.80 m (5 ft 11 in)	Fukien	(Hong Kong)
F	13	Wong Po Sze	25 – 19 December 1992	1.75 m (5 ft 9 in)	Kwan On	(Hong Kong)
G	17	Wong Tsz Ching	29 – 18 May 1989	1.61 m (5 ft 3 in)	Fukien	(Hong Kong)
G/F	21	Li Tsz Kwan	23 – 27 April 1995	1.70 m (5 ft 7 in)	Well Born	(Hong Kong)
G/F	24	Wong Ka Man	26 – 23 April 1992	1.67 m (5 ft 6 in)	7.Up	(Hong Kong)
G	31	Lam Pik Yi	28 – 17 December 1989	1.63 m (5 ft 4 in)	Fukien	(Hong Kong)
G/F	34	Wong Ka Yee	24 – 4 February 1994	1.74 m (5 ft 9 in)	Kwan On	(Hong Kong)
G/F	55	Chan Ching Hang	31 – 14 June 1987	1.65 m (5 ft 5 in)	SCAA	(Hong Kong)

Head coach

- (Hong Kong) Koon Kin Ho

Assistant coach(es)

- (Hong Kong) Chan Tiu Fong
- (Hong Kong) Wong Kar Lok

Legend

- (C) Team captain
- (NP) Naturalized player
- Club - describes last
  club before the tournament
- Age - describes age
  on 15 August 2018

Group Y

Pos	Team	Pld	W	L	PF	PA	PD	Pts	Qualification
1	China	4	4	0	448	182	+266	8	Quarterfinals
2	Japan	4	3	1	392	225	+167	7	Quarterfinals
3	Thailand	4	2	2	231	316	−85	6	Quarterfinals
4	Mongolia	4	1	3	193	358	−165	5	Quarterfinals
5	Hong Kong	4	0	4	230	413	−183	4	

Source: OCA

15 August
16:00

Hong Kong	44–121	Japan
Scoring by quarter: 13–29, 15–33, 6–34, 10–25
Pts: Li 13; Rebs: Wong K.Y. 5 Asts: Wong T. 3		Pts: Nagata 23; Rebs: Umezawa 13; Asts: Yasuma, Miyazaki 12

Gelora Bung Karno Basketball Hall, Jakarta
Referees: Yevgeniy Mikheyev (KAZ), Lee Ji-youn (KOR), Johan Christiana (INA)

17 August
18:30

Mongolia	83–79	Hong Kong
Scoring by quarter: 22–12, 25–26, 17–22, 19–19
Pts: Bulbul 37; Rebs: Solongo 13; Asts: Önörzayaa 7		Pts: Li 22; Rebs: Wong P., Wong K.M. 7 Asts: Li 6

Gelora Bung Karno Basketball Hall, Jakarta
Referees: Harja Jaladri (INA), Lee Ji-youn (KOR), Anan Daraghma (PLE)

19 August
16:00

Thailand	86–76	Hong Kong
Scoring by quarter: 18–16, 23–15, 19–28, 26–17
Pts: Maihom 24; Rebs: Maihom 10; Asts: Saechua, Phromrat 5		Pts: Wong K.M. 23; Rebs: Wong P. 13; Asts: Wong Y., Li 4

Gelora Bung Karno Basketball Hall, Jakarta
Referees: Snehal Bendke (IND), Hadi Salem (IRI), Budi Marfan (INA)

23 August
10:00

Hong Kong	31–123	China
Scoring by quarter: 12–31, 10–29, 5–37, 4–26
Pts: Cheuk 7 Rebs: Wong P. 5 Asts: Wong K.M. 3		Pts: Han 26; Rebs: Li Yue. 11; Asts: Li Yua. 8

Gelora Bung Karno Basketball Hall, Jakarta
Referees: Harja Jaladri (INA), Alexey Stepanenko (KAZ), Kim Jong-kuk (KOR)

== Bowling ==
Men

Athlete	Event	Block 1	Block 2	Total	Rank	Stepladder final 1	Stepladder final 2	Rank
Athlete	Event	Result	Result	Total	Rank	Opposition Result	Opposition Result	Rank
Ivan Tse	Masters	1802	1804	3606	14	did not advance		
Wu Siu Hong; Michael Mak; Eric Tseng	Trios	2098	1989	4087	12	—N/a		
Ivan Tse; Wong Kwan Yuen; Lau Kwun Ho	Trios	2093	1898	3991	16	—N/a		
Wu Siu Hong; Michael Mak; Eric Tseng; Ivan Tse; Wong Kwan Yuen; Lau Kwun Ho	Team of six	4139	4036	8175	2nd place, silver medalist(s)	—N/a		

Women

Athlete	Event	Block 1	Block 2	Total	Rank
Athlete	Event	Result	Result	Total	Rank
Joan Chen; Milki Ng; Chan Shuk Han	Trios	1947	1790	3737	18
Joan Chen; Milki Ng; Chan Shuk Han	Team of six	1748	1713	3461	11

== Canoeing ==
=== Sprint ===
Athlete	Event	Heats		Semifinal		Final	
Athlete	Event	Time	Rank	Time	Rank	Time	Rank
Kwok Ka Wai	Men's K-1 200 m	41.050	6 QS	38.499	4	did not advance	
Cheung Tsz Chung; Mok Yuen Fung	Men's K-2 1000 m	4:13.276	5 QS	3:39.927	4	did not advance	

Qualification legend: QF=Final; QS=Semifinal

=== Traditional boat race ===
Men

Athlete	Event	Heats		Repechage		Semifinals		Final	
Athlete	Event	Time	Rank	Time	Rank	Time	Rank	Time	Rank
Samuel Cheng; Lau Hung Leong; Wan Kin Ming; Tang Chi Ho; Wu Yui Kwong; Li Cai; Leung Tsan; Lam Chun Fai; Sim Shing Ho; Ko Kit Wang; Choy Chun Yin; Wu Kaile; Wong Ka Ho; To Tsz Ching; Lee Yau Shun	TBR 200 m	53.709	5 R	54.434	3 SF	54.756	5 TR	54.077	8
Samuel Cheng; Lau Hung Leong; Wan Kin Ming; Tang Chi Ho; Wu Yui Kwong; Li Cai; Leung Tsan; Lam Chun Fai; Sim Shing Ho; Ko Kit Wang; Choy Chun Yin; Wu Kaile; Wong Ka Ho; To Tsz Ching; Lee Yau Shun	TBR 500 m	2:27.888	5 R	2:24.418	4 SF	2:22.139	4 TR	2:21.571	8
Samuel Cheng; Lau Hung Leong; Wan Kin Ming; Tang Chi Ho; Wu Yui Kwong; Li Cai; Leung Tsan; Lam Chun Fai; Sim Shing Ho; Ko Kit Wang; Choy Chun Yin; Wu Kaile; Wong Ka Ho; To Tsz Ching; Lee Yau Shun	TBR 1000 m	5:13.518	4 R	4:56.056	4 SF	5:10.225	5 TR	4:56.351	10

Women

Athlete	Event	Heats		Repechage		Semifinals		Final	
Athlete	Event	Time	Rank	Time	Rank	Time	Rank	Time	Rank
Tang Man Lok; Wong Lap Man; Wendy Lau; Yoyo Sin; Inglid Li; Cheung Shuk Ting; Leung Po Shan; Yun Kit Yi; Ko Wai Man; Wu Cheuk Wai; Sophia Wong; Li Yan Yan; Peggy To; Tam Tsz Wai	TBR 200 m	1:01.557	5 R	1:01.210	4 SF	1:04.735	5 TR	1:01.214	10
Tang Man Lok; Wong Lap Man; Wendy Lau; Yoyo Sin; Inglid Li; Cheung Shuk Ting; Leung Po Shan; Yun Kit Yi; Ko Wai Man; Wu Cheuk Wai; Sophia Wong; Li Yan Yan; Peggy To; Tam Tsz Wai	TBR 500 m	2:38.620	5 R	2:50.432	5 TR	did not advance		2:40.928	10

=== Canoe polo (demonstration) ===
Athlete	Event	1st round (qualification)		2nd round (loser pool)		Semifinal	Final / BM	
Athlete	Event	Opposition Score	Rank	Opposition Score	Rank	Opposition Score	Opposition Score	Rank
Hong Kong men's	Men's tournament	Chinese Taipei (TPE): L 0–22; Japan (JPN): L 0–24; Thailand (THA): L 2–9	4	Indonesia (INA): L 1–11; Singapore (SGP): L 0–23; Thailand (THA): L 1–8	8	did not advance		
Hong Kong women's	Women's tournament	Chinese Taipei (TPE): L 2–13; Japan (JPN): L 1–15; Thailand (THA): L 4–13	4	Malaysia (MAS): L 4–7; Thailand (THA): L 3–11	7	did not advance		

== Contract bridge ==
Men

Athlete	Event	Qualification		Semifinal		Final	
Athlete	Event	Point	Rank	Point	Rank	Point	Rank
Mak Kwok Fai; Lai Wai Kit	Pair	1772.9	2 Q	1058.4	10 Q	373	3rd place, bronze medalist(s)
Ng Chi Cheung; Lau Pik Kin	Pair	1634.1	6 Q	1092.6	7 Q	332	10
Ho Wai Lam; Ho Hoi Tung	Pair	1500.2	13 Q	1093.4	6 Q	369	5
Zen Wei Peu; Wan Siu Kau; Lai Wai Kit; Mak Kwok Fai; Ng Chi Cheung; Lau Pik Kin	Team	166.03	3 Q	China (CHN); W 127.00–103.67		Singapore (SGP); L 52–107	2nd place, silver medalist(s)

Women

Athlete	Event	Qualification		Semifinal		Final	
Athlete	Event	Point	Rank	Point	Rank	Point	Rank
Charmian Koo; Flora Wong	Pair	940.6	1 Q	720.9	12 Q	366.8	5
Tang Tsz In; Joyce Tung	Pair	927.8	2 Q	749.1	8 Q	325.8	9
Yeung Hoi Ning; Pearlie Chan	Pair	889.9	8 Q	775.9	4 Q	383.8	3rd place, bronze medalist(s)

Mixed

Athlete	Event	Qualification		Semifinal		Final	
Athlete	Event	Point	Rank	Point	Rank	Point	Rank
Roger Ling; Pauline Ling Lo	Pair	1183.5	17	did not advance			
Charmian Koo; Flora Wong; Yeung Hoi Ning; Pearlie Chan; Ho Wai Lam; Ho Hoi Tung	Supermixed team	99.78	4 Q	Chinese Taipei (TPE); W 104–92.33		China (CHN); L 37.67–134	2nd place, silver medalist(s)

== Cycling ==
=== Mountain biking ===
Athlete	Event	Final	
Athlete	Event	Time	Rank
Lai Chun Kin	Men's cross-country	−2 laps	14

=== Road ===
Athlete	Event	Final	
Athlete	Event	Time	Rank
Cheung King Lok	Men's road race	3:35:49	41
Chiu Ho San	Men's road race	3:29:10	24
Choy Hiu Fung	Men's road race	3:27:34	17
Vincent Lau	Men's road race	3:36:12	44
Pang Yao	Women's road race	3:07:43	19
Yang Qianyu	Women's road race	2:57:09	4
Fung Ka Hoo	Men's time trial	1:02:29.66	10
Leung Wing Yee	Women's time trial	34:22.15	3rd place, bronze medalist(s)

=== Track ===
Sprint

Athlete	Event	Qualification		Round of 32	Round of 16	Quarterfinals	Semifinals	Final	
Athlete	Event	Time	Rank	Opposition Time	Opposition Time	Opposition Time	Opposition Time	Opposition Time	Rank
Law Tsz Chun	Men's sprint	10.248	10	Bye	SF Sahrom (MAS); L	did not advance			10
Jessica Lee	Women's sprint	11.027	5	—N/a	D Herold (IND); W 11.467	Cho S-y (KOR); L	did not advance		5
Lee Wai Sze	Women's sprint	10.583 GR	1	—N/a	A Reji (IND); W 11.895	R Ota (JPN); W 11.441	Cho S-y (KOR); W 11.295 (FA)	Lee H-j (KOR); W 11.157	1st place, gold medalist(s)

Team sprint

Athlete	Event	Qualification		Final	
Athlete	Event	Time	Rank	Opposition Time	Rank
Victor Lau; Ho Burr; Law Tsz Chun	Men's team sprint	48.830	10	did not advance	
Li Yin Yin; Ma Wing Yu; Lee Wai Sze^{a}	Women's team sprint	33.484	2 FA	China (CHN); L	2nd place, silver medalist(s)

^{a} Riders who participated in the heats only and received medals.
Qualification legend: FA=Gold medal final; FB=Bronze medal final

Pursuit

Athlete	Event	Qualification		Round 1		Final	
Athlete	Event	Time	Rank	Opposition Time	Rank	Opposition Time	Rank
Ko Siu Wai	Men's pursuit	4:33.863	4 FB	—N/a		A Zakharov (KAZ); L	4
Leung Bo Yee	Women's pursuit	3:47.570	5	—N/a		did not advance	
Leung Chun Wing; Leung Ka Yu; Mow Ching Yin; Cheung King Lok; Ko Siu Wai^{a}	Men's team pursuit	4:09.820	2 Q	Kazakhstan (KAZ); W 4:06.085	1 FA	China (CHN); L	2nd place, silver medalist(s)
Yang Qianyu; Leung Bo Yee; Leung Wing Yee; Diao Xiaojuan; Pang Yao	Women's team pursuit	4:40.246	4 Q	South Korea (KOR); L	4 FB	Japan (JPN); L	4

^{a} Riders who participated in the heats only and received medals.
Qualification legend: FA=Gold medal final; FB=Bronze medal final

Keirin

Athlete	Event	1st Round	Repechage	2nd Round	Final
Athlete	Event	Rank	Rank	Rank	Rank
Law Tsz Chun	Men's keirin	6 R	6	did not advance	
Jessica Lee	Women's keirin	3 R	1 Q	2 FA	4
Lee Wai Sze	Women's keirin	1 Q	Bye	1 FA	1st place, gold medalist(s)

Qualification legend: FA=Gold medal final; FB=Bronze medal final

Omnium

Athlete	Event	Scratch race		Tempo race		Elimination race		Points race		Total points	Rank
Athlete	Event	Rank	Points	Rank	Points	Rank	Points	Rank	Points	Total points	Rank
Leung Chun Wing	Men's omnium	7	28	1	40	5	32	4	14	114	2nd place, silver medalist(s)
Diao Xiaojuan	Women's omnium	8	26	4	34	7	28	—	DNF	DNF	—

Madison

Athlete	Event	Points	Laps	Rank
Cheung King Lok; Leung Chun Wing	Men's madison	59	20	1st place, gold medalist(s)
Yang Qianyu; Pang Yao	Women's madison	61	40	2nd place, silver medalist(s)

== Diving ==
Men

Athlete	Event	Preliminaries		Final	
Athlete	Event	Points	Rank	Points	Rank
Yuen Pak Yin	1 m springboard	204.75	12 Q	202.55	12

Women

Athlete	Event	Preliminaries		Final	
Athlete	Event	Points	Rank	Points	Rank
Chan Lam	1 m springboard	178.40	12 Q	150.20	12
Chan Lam	3 m springboard	203.90	9 Q	192.60	12
Lee Yin Ting; Liu Yuen Ki	3 m synchronized springboard	—N/a		186.87	9

== Equestrian ==
Hong Kong was named eight athletes to compete at the Games.

Dressage

Athlete	Horse	Event	Prix St-Georges		Intermediate I		Intermediate I Freestyle	
Athlete	Horse	Event	Score	Rank	Score	Rank	Score	Rank
Jacqueline Siu	Jc Fuerst On Tour	Individual	70.735	3 Q	71.970	2 Q	77.045	1st place, gold medalist(s)

Eventing

Athlete	Horse	Event	Dressage		Cross-country			Jumping		
Athlete	Horse	Event	Penalties	Rank	Penalties	Total	Rank	Penalties	Total	Rank
Nicole Michele Fardel	Viharra du Causse	Individual	34.10 #	23	23.20	57.30	18 Q	0.00	57.30	17
Annie Ho	JC Fleurelle	Individual	31.60	12	11.20	42.80	15 Q	0.00	42.80	12
Patrick Lam	JC Weronique	Individual	30.00	8	Eliminated			did not advance		
Su Yu Xuan	Diva de Lux	Individual	33.00	18	2.40	35.40	11 Q	Withdrew		
Patrick Lam; Annie Ho; Su Yu Xuan; Nicole Michele Fardel	See above	Team	94.60	4		135.50	4		1100.10	5

Jumping

Athlete	Horse	Event	Qualification		Qualifier 1			Qualifier 2 Team Final			Final round A			Final round B		
Athlete	Horse	Event	Points	Rank	Penalties	Total	Rank	Penalties	Total	Rank	Penalties	Total	Rank	Penalties	Total	Rank
Jacqueline Lai	Basta	Individual	1.93	6	12 #	13.93	29 Q	8	21.93	28 Q	4	25.93	22	did not advance		
Patrick Lam	Quintino 9	Individual	6.29	27	8	14.29	31 Q	13 #	27.29	35	did not advance					
Raena Leung	Orphee du Granit	Individual	8.16	33	8	16.16	35 Q	0	16.16	23 Q	8	24.16	20 Q	0	24.16	15
Clarissa Lyra	Catokia 2	Individual	9.30 #	39	1	10.30	20 Q	5	15.30	21 Q	0	15.30	12 Q	1	16.30	9
Patrick Lam; Raena Leung; Clarissa Lyra; Jacqueline Lai	See above	Team	16.38	6	17	33.38	8 Q	13	46.38	7	—N/a					

1. – indicates that the score of this rider does not count in the team competition, since only the best three results of a team are counted.

== Esports (demonstration) ==
Arena of Valor and Clash Royale

Athlete	ID	Event	Round 1	Round 2	Round 3	Loser round 1	Loser round 2	Loser round 3	Semifinal	Final	
Athlete	ID	Event	Opposition score	Opposition score	Opposition score	Opposition score	Opposition score	Opposition score	Opposition score	Opposition score	Rank
黃耀東 黃錦梁 余翰禮 辛昊軒 陳家傑 陳子軒	Miss; Mid; Lacia 頭仔; Kit 劍城神崎	Arena of Valor	Laos; W 2–0	Vietnam; L 1–2	Did not advance	Bye	Laos; W 2–0	Chinese Taipei; L 0–2	did not advance		4
Ho ho-nam	Aaron	Clash Royale	Laos; W 3–2	Indonesia; L 1–3	Did not advance	Bye	China; L 0–3	did not advance			

Hearthstone

Athlete	ID	Event	Quarterfinals	Semifinals	Final / BM	
Athlete	ID	Event	Opposition score	Opposition score	Opposition score	Rank
Lo Tsz Kin	Kin0531	Hearthstone	Kyrgyzstan; W 3–0	India; W 3–2	Indonesia; W 3–1	1st place, gold medalist(s)

Pro Evolution Soccer

Athlete	ID	Event	Group stage		Semifinals	Final / BM	
Athlete	ID	Event	Oppositions scores	Rank	Opposition score	Opposition score	Rank
Ng Chor Kwan; Lam Wing Cheung	Charles_ng gugulam	Pro Evolution Soccer	Malaysia: L 0–2; Iran: L 0–2; Kazakhstan: W 2–0	3	did not advance		

== Fencing ==
Individual

Athlete	Event	Preliminary		Round of 32	Round of 16	Quarterfinals	Semifinals	Final	
Athlete	Event	Opposition score	Rank	Opposition score	Opposition score	Opposition score	Opposition score	Opposition score	Rank
Fong Hoi Sun	Men's épée	R Petrov (KGZ): W 5–3; M Esmaeili (IRI): W 4–3; K Kano (JPN): L 2–5; Chantharapidok (THA): W 5–3; Nguyễn TN (VIE): W 1–0	2 Q	R Petrov (KGZ); L 13–14	did not advance				17
Ho Wai Hang	Men's épée	R Kurbanov (KAZ): W 5–3; K Minobe (JPN): L 2–5; K Baudunov (KGZ): W 5–2; R Pratama (INA): W 5–2; M Mirzaei (QAT): W 5–0	1 Q	Bye	Park S-y (KOR); L 8–15	did not advance			11
Cheung Ka Long	Men's foil	N Perez (PHI): W 5–3; Nguyễn MQ (VIE): W 5–0; C Mayakarn (THA): W 5–0; D Satriana (INA): W 5–1	1 Q	Bye	D Satriana (INA); W 15–4	T Saito (JPN); W 15–3	N Choi (HKG); L 9–15	Did not advance	3rd place, bronze medalist(s)
Nicholas Choi	Men's foil	A Alquradaghi (QAT): W 5–0; Hoi MK (MAC): W 5–2; T Kaliyev (KAZ): W 5–1; Cheng XH (MAS): W 5–0; Ou F-m (TPE): W 5–1	1 Q	Bye	N Perez (PHI); W 15–6	Ha T-g (KOR); W 15–11	Cheung KL (HKG); W 15–9	Huang MK (CHN); L 10–11	2nd place, silver medalist(s)
Lam Hin Chung	Men's sabre	I Setiawan (INA): L 3–5; K Yoshida (JPN): L 0–5; A Pakdaman (IRI): L 2–5; Nguyễn XL (VIE): W 5–1; A Salmanpoor (QAT): W 5–1	5 Q	Bye	A Pakdaman (IRI); L 10–15	did not advance			15
Low Ho Tin	Men's sabre	M Abedini (IRI): W 5–4; Vũ TA (VIE): W 5–4; N Al-Saadi (QAT): W 5–3; Xu YM (CHN): W 5–2; SA Putra (MAS): W 5–1	1 Q	Bye	I Mokretsov (KAZ); W 15–8	Wang S (CHN); W 15–9	Gu B-g (KOR); L 4–15	Did not advance	3rd place, bronze medalist(s)
Kaylin Hsieh Sin-yan	Women's épée	W Takhamwong (THA): L 4–5; R Alshamma (UAE): W 5–1; W Al-Bdulla (QAT): W 5–1; Zhu MY (CHN): W 3–2; VA Lim (SGP): W 5–2	2 Q	Bye	Nguyễn TNH (VIE); W 13–10	Choi I-j (KOR); L 11–12	did not advance		5
Vivian Kong	Women's épée	Nguyễn TNH (VIE): W 5–1; S Komata (JPN): W 5–2; K Thanee (THA): W 5–3; T Al-Abdulla (QAT): W 5–0; K Ganbold (MGL): W 5–1	1 Q	Bye	U Balaganskaya (KAZ); W 15–5	J Dutta (IND); W 15–3	Kang Y-m (KOR); L 12–13	Did not advance	3rd place, bronze medalist(s)
Kimberley Vanessa Cheung	Women's foil	Nam H-h (KOR): L 3–5; M Wong (SGP): L 4–5; Đỗ TA (VIE): W 5–3; Siribrahmanakul (THA): W 5–0; Yang C-m (TPE): L 4–5	5 Q	Ho KU (MAC); W 15–2	Fu YT (CHN); L 12–14	did not advance			16
Liu Yan Wai	Women's foil	Cheng H (TPE): W 5–3; Jeon H-s (KOR): L 1–5; N Aini (INA): W 5–4; Ho PI (MAC): W 5–0; M Shaito (LBN): W 5–4; L Al-Hosani (UAE): W 5–4	2 Q	Bye	Catantan (PHI); W 15–14	Huo XX (CHN); W 15–8	Fu YT (CHN); L 10–15	Did not advance	3rd place, bronze medalist(s)
Au Sin Ying	Women's sabre	Y Ariunzayaa (MGL): W 5–1; Bùi TTH (VIE): L 4–5; K Shreshta (NEP): W 5–0; N Tamura (JPN): L 3–5; Qian JR (CHN): L 4–5	4 Q	Bye	Kim J-y (KOR); L 10–15	did not advance			14
Karen Chang	Women's sabre	Shao YQ (CHN): W 5–3; Ngernrungruangroj (THA): W 5–2; Y Lau (SGP): W 5–2; A Sarybay (KAZ): L 0–5	1 Q	Bye	T Pochekutova (KAZ); W 15–9	Kim J-y (KOR); L 4–15	did not advance		7

Team

Athlete	Event	Round of 16	Quarterfinals	Semifinals	Final	
Athlete	Event	Opposition score	Opposition score	Opposition score	Opposition score	Rank
Fong Hoi Sun; Ho Wai Hang; Clarence Lai; Ng Ho Tin	Men's épée	Qatar (QAT); W 45–31	Kazakhstan (KAZ); L 33–45	did not advance		7
Cheung Ka Long; Nicholas Choi; Ryan Choi; Yeung Chi Ka	Men's foil	Bye	Indonesia (INA); W 45–11	Japan (JPN); W 45–42	South Korea (KOR); L 37–45	2nd place, silver medalist(s)
Cyrus Chang; Lam Hin Chung; Terence Lee; Low Ho Tin	Men's sabre	Bye	Vietnam (VIE); W 45–36	South Korea (KOR); L 20–45	Did not advance	3rd place, bronze medalist(s)
Chu Ka Mong; Kaylin Hsieh; Vivian Kong; Coco Lin	Women's épée	Bye	Kazakhstan (KAZ); W 45–26	China (CHN); L 34–45	Did not advance	3rd place, bronze medalist(s)
Cheng Hiu Lam; Kimberley Vanessa Cheung; Liu Yan Wai; Sophia Wu	Women's foil	Bye	South Korea (KOR); L 32–45	did not advance		5
Au Sin Ying; Chan Yin Fei; Karen Chang; Lam Hin Wai	Women's sabre	Bye	Kazakhstan (KAZ); L 40–45	did not advance		5

== Field hockey ==
Hong Kong qualified a women's field hockey team after placed second at the qualifying tournament in Bangkok, Thailand. The men's team also competed at the Games after received reallocation.

Summary

Team	Event	Group Stage						Semifinal	Final / BM / Pl.	
Team	Event	Opposition Score	Opposition Score	Opposition Score	Opposition Score	Opposition Score	Rank	Opposition Score	Opposition Score	Rank
Hong Kong men's	Men's tournament	South Korea; L 0–11	India; L 0–26	Sri Lanka; L 1–4	Japan; L 0–13	Indonesia; L 2–3	6	Did not advance	Kazakhstan; L 2–3^{P} FT: 2–2	12
Hong Kong women's	Women's tournament	Malaysia; L 0–8	Japan; L 0–6	Chinese Taipei; L 2–3	China; L 0–15	—N/a	5	Did not advance	Kazakhstan; W 2–0	9

=== Men's tournament ===
Roster

The following is the Hong Kong roster in the men's field hockey tournament of the 2018 Asian Games.

Head coach: (South Africa) Fabian Gregory

1. Chan Hou-Fong (GK)
2. Tse Man Chun
4. Felix Iu Chi Him
6. Yu Chi Wai
7. Yu Chun Hin
11. Chan Ka Chun
12. Chuen Kwun Wa
13. Angus Chan
15. Tso Tsz Fung
16. Michael Chung Yan Chun (GK)
17. Davis Kwok Chun Ting
19. Gabriel Tsoi
20. Siu Chung Ming (C)
21. Windfall Monthong
22. Ho Ching
23. Martin Tsang
27. Marco Yu
28. Jasper Au

Pool A

Pos	Team	Pld	W	D	L	PF	PA	PD	Pts	Qualification
1	India	5	5	0	0	76	3	+73	15	Semi-finals
2	Japan	5	4	0	1	30	11	+19	12	Semi-finals
3	South Korea	5	3	0	2	39	8	+31	9	Fifth place game
4	Sri Lanka	5	2	0	3	7	41	−34	6	Seventh place game
5	Indonesia (H)	5	1	0	4	5	40	−35	3	Ninth place game
6	Hong Kong	5	0	0	5	3	57	−54	0	Eleventh place game

Source: FIH
Rules for classification: 1) points; 2) goal difference; 3) goals scored; 4) head-to-head result.
(H) Hosts

20 August 2018
10:00

South Korea	11–0	Hong Kong
Jeong 4', 26', 34'; Jang 13', 21', 33', 54'; Seo 20'; Kim Se. 39'; Yang 57'; Kim J. 60'	Report

Umpires:
Saleh Al-Balushi (OMA)
Rawi Anbananthan (MAS)

22 August 2018
14:00

India	26–0	Hong Kong
Akashdeep 2', 32', 39'; Manpreet 3', 17'; Rupinder 3', 5', 45+', 60'; S. V. Sunil 7'; Prasad 14'; Lalit 17', 19', 35', 55'; Mandeep 21'; Varun 23', 30+'; Amit 27'; Harmanpreet 29', 52', 53', 55'; Dilpreet 48'; Chinglensana 51'; Simranjeet 53'	Report

Umpires:
Rawi Anbananthan (MAS)
Narongtuch Subboonsong (THA)

24 August 2018
18:00

Sri Lanka	4–1	Hong Kong
Kulathunga 7'; Rathnayake 26'; Sudusinghe 51'; Gedara 55'	Report	Iu 54'

Umpires:
Salim Lucky (BAN)
Saleh Al-Balushi (OMA)

26 August 2018
12:00

Hong Kong	0–13	Japan
	Report	S. Tanaka 10'; Ka. Tanaka 10', 29'; Ke. Tanaka 22', 38'; Zendana 24'; Ochiai 27'; Yamasaki 30', 41'; Fukuda 44', 51'; Murata 47'; Yamada 59'

Umpires:
You Suolong (CHN)
Hafiz Atif Latif (PAK)

28 August 2018
10:00

Hong Kong	2–3	Indonesia
Siu 26'; Tsoi 60'	Report	Prastyo 13'; Aunalal 39'; Ardam 41'

Umpires:
Hafiz Atif Latif (PAK)
Salim Lucky (BAN)

Eleventh place game

1 September 2018
12:30

Hong Kong	2–2	Kazakhstan
Iu 12'; Tso 55'	Report	Tashkeyev 21', 34'
Penalties
Cheun (penalty shoot-out missed); Iu (penalty shoot-out scored); Chan (penalty shoot-out scored); Monthong (penalty shoot-out missed); Ho (penalty shoot-out missed)	2–3	(penalty shoot-out scored) Yelubayev; (penalty shoot-out missed) Mukhamadiyev; (penalty shoot-out missed) Dyussebekov; (penalty shoot-out scored) Tashkeyev; (penalty shoot-out scored) Urmanov

Umpires:
Michihiko Watanabe (JPN)
Hafiz Atif Latif (PAK)

=== Women's tournament ===
Roster

The following is the Hong Kong roster in the women's field hockey tournament of the 2018 Asian Games.

Head coach: (Hong Kong) Arif Ali

1. Yip Ting Wai (GK)
2. Chan Yi Man
3. Tiffany Chan
4. Katherine Mountain
5. Evelyn Cheung
6. Wong Wai Ki
7. Chan Chi
8. Melvina Cheng
9. Weeraya Ho
10. Chan Ching Nam
11. Chuen Sze Sze
12. Ngan Yuet
13. Patricia Chiu
14. Lau Pui Sze
15. Lo I Ka (C)
16. Hong Ka Man (GK)
17. Melissa Law Ka Mun
18. Olivia Chiu

Pool A

Pos	Team	Pld	W	D	L	PF	PA	PD	Pts	Qualification
1	Japan	4	4	0	0	24	3	+21	12	Semifinals
2	China	4	2	1	1	28	6	+22	7	Semifinals
3	Malaysia	4	2	1	1	22	5	+17	7	5th place game
4	Chinese Taipei	4	1	0	3	3	33	−30	3	7th place game
5	Hong Kong	4	0	0	4	2	32	−30	0	9th place game

Source: FIH
Rules for classification: 1) points; 2) goal difference; 3) goals scored; 4) head-to-head result.

19 August 2018
18:00

Malaysia	8–0	Hong Kong
Abdul Rashid 3', 45', 58'; Zulkifli 16', 34'; Onn 32'; Sylvester 50'; Sumantri 59'	Report

Umpires:
Cookie Tan (SGP)
Kim Yoon-seon (KOR)

21 August 2018
14:00

Japan	6–0	Hong Kong
Yamada 11', 42'; Ono 26'; Aikawa 33'; Nishikori 37', 59'	Report

Umpires:
Ayanna McClean (TTO)
Ornpimol Kittiteerasopon (THA)

23 August 2018
16:00

Hong Kong	2–3	Chinese Taipei
O. Chiu 22'; Lau 34'	Report	Yang Chi. 15'; Liao 40'; Yang Chu. 42'

Umpires:
Suzi Sutton (USA)
Binish Hayat (PAK)

27 August 2018
18:00

China	15–0	Hong Kong
Peng 15'; Ou 20', 41'; Xi 22', 29', 44'; Gu 30', 34', 35', 36', 37', 40', 46'; Liang 44'; Li 60'	Report

Umpires:
Binish Hayat (PAK)
Dahiya Seepa (IND)

Ninth place game

31 August 2018
15:00

Hong Kong	2–0	Kazakhstan
Lo 21'; Chan YM 52'	Report

Umpires:
Junko Wagatsuma (JPN)
Binish Hayat (PAK)

== Football ==
Hong Kong joined in group A at the men's football event, and the women's team competed in the group B.

Summary

Team	Event	Group Stage					Round of 16	Quarterfinal	Semifinal	Final / BM	
Team	Event	Opposition Score	Opposition Score	Opposition Score	Opposition Score	Rank	Opposition Score	Opposition Score	Opposition Score	Opposition Score	Rank
Hong Kong men's	Men's tournament	Laos; W 3–1	Chinese Taipei; W 4–0	Palestine; D 1–1	Indonesia; L 3−1	3 Q	Uzbekistan; L 0−3	did not advance			14
Hong Kong women's	Women's tournament	—N/a	China; L 0–7	North Korea; L 0−8	Tajikistan; W 6−1	3 Q	—N/a	South Korea; L 0−5	did not advance		8

=== Men's tournament ===
Roster

The following is the Hong Kong squad in the men's football tournament of the 2018 Asian Games.

Head coach: Kwok Kar Lok

No.	Pos.	Player	Date of birth (age)	Club
1	GK	Yuen Ho Chun	19 July 1995 (aged 23)	(Football Association of Hong Kong, China) Lee Man
2	DF	Fernando Recio*	17 December 1982 (aged 35)	(Football Association of Hong Kong, China) Kitchee
3	DF	Tsui Wang Kit	5 January 1997 (aged 21)	(Chinese Football Association) Meizhou Hakka
4	DF	Lau Hok Ming (captain)	19 October 1995 (aged 22)	(Football Association of Hong Kong, China) Southern
5	DF	Vas Núñez	12 November 1995 (aged 22)	(Football Association of Hong Kong, China) R&F
6	MF	Tan Chun Lok	15 January 1996 (aged 22)	(Chinese Football Association) Guangzhou R&F
7	FW	Cheng Chin Lung	7 January 1998 (aged 20)	(Football Association of Hong Kong, China) Kitchee
8	MF	Remi Dujardin	23 June 1997 (aged 21)	(United States Soccer Federation) St. Bonaventure Bonnies
9	FW	Chung Wai Keung	21 October 1995 (aged 22)	(Football Association of Hong Kong, China) Tai Po
10	MF	Lam Ka Wai*	5 June 1985 (aged 33)	(Football Association of Hong Kong, China) Eastern
11	FW	Matt Orr	1 January 1997 (aged 21)	(United States Soccer Federation) San Francisco Dons
12	MF	Wu Chun Ming	21 November 1997 (aged 20)	(Football Association of Hong Kong, China) Pegasus
13	DF	Yiu Ho Ming	1 May 1995 (aged 23)	(Football Association of Hong Kong, China) Eastern
14	DF	Tse Long Hin	6 February 1995 (aged 23)	(Football Association of Hong Kong, China) Eastern
15	DF	Yu Pui Hong	7 February 1995 (aged 23)	(Football Association of Hong Kong, China) Lee Man
19	GK	Chan Ka Ho	27 January 1996 (aged 22)	(Football Association of Hong Kong, China) Kitchee
16	MF	Lam Hin Ting	9 December 1999 (aged 18)	(Football Association of Hong Kong, China) Dreams FC
17	MF	Law Hiu Chung	10 June 1995 (aged 23)	(Football Association of Hong Kong, China) Pegasus
18	FW	Jordi Tarrés*	16 March 1981 (aged 37)	(Football Association of Hong Kong, China) Kitchee
20	FW	Chiu Siu Wai	16 February 1996 (aged 22)	(Football Association of Hong Kong, China) Tai Po

* Over-aged player.

Group A

Pos	Team	Pld	W	D	L	GF	GA	GD	Pts	Qualification
1	Indonesia (H)	4	3	0	1	11	3	+8	9	Advance to knockout stage
2	Palestine	4	2	2	0	5	3	+2	8	Advance to knockout stage
3	Hong Kong	4	2	1	1	9	5	+4	7	Advance to knockout stage
4	Laos	4	1	0	3	4	8	−4	3	
5	Chinese Taipei	4	0	1	3	0	10	−10	1	

Source: Asian Games 2018
Rules for classification: Group stage tiebreakers
(H) Hosts
10 August 2018
16:00 UTC+7

Laos	1–3	Hong Kong
Kongmathilath 62'	Report	Cheng Chin Lung 20'; Tan Chun Lok 40'; Lounlasy 86' (o.g.)

Patriot Candrabhaga Stadium, Bekasi
Referee: Timur Faizullin (Kyrgyzstan)

15 August 2018
16:00 UTC+7

Hong Kong	4–0	Chinese Taipei
Tan Chun Lok 5', 37'; Tarrés 9', 41'	Report

Patriot Candrabhaga Stadium, Bekasi
Referee: Suhaizi Shukri (Malaysia)

17 August 2018
16:00 UTC+7

Hong Kong	1–1	Palestine
Lam Ka Wai 57'	Report	Yousef 17'

Patriot Candrabhaga Stadium, Bekasi
Referee: Takuto Okabe (Japan)

20 August 2018
19:00 UTC+7

Indonesia	3–1	Hong Kong
Irfan 46'; Lilipaly 85'; Hanif 90+4'	Report	Lau Hok Ming 39'

Patriot Candrabhaga Stadium, Bekasi
Referee: Aziz Asimov (Uzbekistan)

Round of 16

23 August 2018
16:00 UTC+7

Uzbekistan	3–0	Hong Kong
Alibaev 27'; Sidikov 60'; Urinboev 65'	Report

Wibawa Mukti Stadium, Cikarang
Referee: Sultan Al-Marzooqi (United Arab Emirates)

=== Women's tournament ===
Roster

The following is the Hong Kong squad in the women's football tournament of the 2018 Asian Games.

Head coach: (Brazil) José Ricardo Rambo

No.	Pos.	Player	Date of birth (age)	Caps	Goals	Club
1	GK	Leung Wai Nga	24 August 1988 (aged 29)			(Football Association of Hong Kong, China) Kitchee
18	GK	Ng Cheuk Wai	19 March 1997 (aged 21)			(Football Association of Hong Kong, China) Happy Valley
2	DF	Chung Pui Ki	2 February 1998 (aged 20)			(Football Association of Hong Kong, China) Kitchee
3	DF	Chu Ling Ling	15 February 1987 (aged 31)			(Football Association of Hong Kong, China) Citizen
10	DF	Sin Chung Yee	8 August 1992 (aged 26)			(Football Association of Hong Kong, China) Happy Valley
13	DF	Ma Chak Shun	2 March 1996 (aged 22)			(Football Association of Hong Kong, China) Happy Valley
16	DF	Wong So Han	26 November 1991 (aged 26)			(Football Association of Hong Kong, China) Happy Valley
17	DF	Kwok Ching Man	7 June 1993 (aged 25)			(Football Association of Hong Kong, China) Citizen
21	DF	Lydia Mak	29 April 1999 (aged 19)			(Football Association of Hong Kong, China) Tai Po
4	MF	Yiu Hei Man	22 September 1990 (aged 27)			(Football Association of Hong Kong, China) Happy Valley
5	MF	Lau Yui Ching	15 August 1994 (aged 24)			(Football Association of Hong Kong, China) Lung Moon
6	MF	Chan Wing Sze (captain)	11 September 1983 (aged 34)			(Football Association of Hong Kong, China) Citizen
8	MF	Cham Ching Man	1 May 1996 (aged 22)			(Football Association of Hong Kong, China) Happy Valley
9	MF	Wai Yuen Ting	15 October 1992 (aged 25)			(Football Association of Hong Kong, China) Citizen
11	MF	Chun Ching Hang	16 July 1989 (aged 29)			(Football Association of Wales) Swansea
14	MF	Lee Wing Yan	28 April 1997 (aged 21)			(Football Association of Hong Kong, China) Happy Valley
7	FW	Cheung Wai Ki	22 November 1990 (aged 27)			(Football Australia) Brisbane Roar
12	FW	Kay Fung	8 November 1988 (aged 29)			(Football Association of Hong Kong, China) Citizen
15	FW	Heidi Yuen	22 August 1992 (aged 25)			(Football Association of Hong Kong, China) Citizen
23	FW	Ho Mui Mei	15 March 1993 (aged 25)			(Football Association of Hong Kong, China) Citizen

Group B

Pos	Team	Pld	W	D	L	GF	GA	GD	Pts	Qualification
1	China	3	3	0	0	25	0	+25	9	Advance to Knockout stage
2	North Korea	3	2	0	1	24	2	+22	6	Advance to Knockout stage
3	Hong Kong	3	1	0	2	6	16	−10	3	Advance to Knockout stage
4	Tajikistan	3	0	0	3	1	38	−37	0	

Source: Asian Games 2018
Rules for classification: Group stage tiebreakers
17 August 2018
18:30 UTC+7

China	7–0	Hong Kong
Wang Shuang 7' (pen.); Wang Shanshan 20'; Li Ying 28'; Li Jiayue 42'; Chan Wing Sze 48' (o.g.); Gu Yasha 51', 72'	Report

Gelora Sriwijaya Stadium, Palembang
Referee: Oh Hyeon-jeong (South Korea)

20 August 2018
18:30 UTC+7

Hong Kong	0–8	North Korea
	Report	Ri Un-yong 19'; Yu Jong-im 22', 45+2'; Kim Yun-mi 36'; Pak Hye-gyong 55'; Kim Un-hwa 59'; Ri Hae-yon 78'; Fung 82' (o.g.)

Bumi Sriwijaya Stadium, Palembang
Referee: Anna Sidorova (Uzbekistan)

22 August 2018
18:30 UTC+7

Hong Kong	6–1	Tajikistan
Chan Wing Sze 2'; Yuen 10'; Ho Mui Mei 25', 32'; Cham Ching Man 39'; Chun Ching Hang 68'	Report	Sotnikova 36'

Bumi Sriwijaya Stadium, Palembang
Referee: Lee Yi-chi (Chinese Taipei)

Quarter-finals

24 August 2018
16:00 UTC+7

South Korea	5–0	Hong Kong
Jeon Ga-eul 20', 32'; Lee Geum-min 34'; Moon Mi-ra 79'; Lee Min-a 82'	Report

Gelora Sriwijaya Stadium, Palembang
Referee: Asaka Matsushita (Japan)

== Golf ==
Hong Kong Golf Association announced their squad of seven golfers (4 men's and 3 women's) who compete in the individual and team events.

Men

Athlete	Event	Round 1	Round 2	Round 3	Round 4	Total		
Athlete	Event	Score	Score	Score	Score	Score	Par	Rank
Wong Shuai Ming	Individual	73	72	72	74	291	+3	26
Matthew Cheung	Individual	75	77	76	76	304	+16	44
Ng Shing Fung	Individual	77	73	76	77	303	+15	43
Jonathan Lai	Individual	77	73	71	74	295	+7	32
Wong Shuai Ming; Matthew Cheung; Ng Shing Fung; Jonathan Lai	Team	225	218	219	224	884	+22	11

Women

Athlete	Event	Round 1	Round 2	Round 3	Round 4	Total		
Athlete	Event	Score	Score	Score	Score	Score	Par	Rank
Mimi Ho Miu Yee	Individual	78	71	77	76	302	+14	30
Michelle Cheung	Individual	79	75	75	72	301	+13	28
Isabella Leung	Individual	74	76	71	67	288	E	14
Mimi Ho Miu Yee; Michelle Cheung; Isabella Leung	Team	152	146	146	139	583	+7	10

== Handball ==
Hong Kong men's team were drawn in group C, while the women's team in group B.

Summary

Key:

- ET – After extra time
- P – Match decided by penalty-shootout.

Team	Event	Preliminary	Standing	Main / Class.	Rank / standing	Semifinals / Pl.	Final / BM / Pl.	
Team	Event	Opposition score	Standing	Opposition score	Rank / standing	Opposition score	Opposition score	Rank
Hong Kong men's	Men's tournament	Group C Indonesia: W 40–17; Saudi Arabia: L 24–42	2 Q	Group II; South Korea: L 15–40; Iran: L 20–46; Bahrain: L 19–43	4	Did not advance	Iraq; L 24–31	8
Hong Kong women's	Women's tournament	Group B Japan: L 13–41; Thailand: L 24–30; Indonesia: W 35–11; Malaysia: W 40–15	3	—N/a		Kazakhstan; L 23–35	Indonesia; W 30–16	7

=== Men's tournament ===
Roster

- Addy Ip Kwun Ying
- Leung Laam Hei
- Kenny Wong Chak Kiu
- Wong Shing Yip
- Chan Ka Him
- Tse Wing Fai
- Eddy Ip Kwun Hung
- Ip Shi Yan
- Cheung Wai Ho
- Lau Kin Pan
- Wong Chun Ho
- Kuo Sze Ming
- Dilyadav Singh
- Lin Ming Fai
- Yuen Hei Yin
- Tony Lee Wai Tung

Group C

Pos	Team	Pld	W	D	L	GF	GA	GD	Pts	Qualification
1	Saudi Arabia	2	2	0	0	89	37	+52	4	Main round / Group 1–2
2	Hong Kong	2	1	0	1	64	59	+5	2	Main round / Group 1–2
3	Indonesia	2	0	0	2	30	87	−57	0	Main round / Group 3

Source: AHF

13 August; 20:00	Hong Kong	40–17	Indonesia	POPKI Sports Hall, Jakarta; Referees: Tavakkoli, Valadkhanian (IRI)
13 August; 20:00	Chan 9	(19–6)	Tolang 5	POPKI Sports Hall, Jakarta; Referees: Tavakkoli, Valadkhanian (IRI)
13 August; 20:00	3× (yellow card) 2× (suspension)		2× (yellow card) 3× (suspension)	POPKI Sports Hall, Jakarta; Referees: Tavakkoli, Valadkhanian (IRI)

15 August; 16:00	Saudi Arabia	42–24	Hong Kong	POPKI Sports Hall, Jakarta; Referees: Lee, Koo (KOR)
15 August; 16:00	Saeed, Moj. Al-Salem 5	(21–12)	Ip S. 6	POPKI Sports Hall, Jakarta; Referees: Lee, Koo (KOR)
15 August; 16:00	3× (suspension)		2× (yellow card) 2× (suspension)	POPKI Sports Hall, Jakarta; Referees: Lee, Koo (KOR)

Main round (Group II)

Pos	Team	Pld	W	D	L	GF	GA	GD	Pts	Qualification
1	Bahrain	3	3	0	0	99	67	+32	6	Semifinals
2	South Korea	3	2	0	1	99	70	+29	4	Semifinals
3	Iran	3	1	0	2	97	83	+14	2	Classification 5th–6th
4	Hong Kong	3	0	0	3	54	129	−75	0	Classification 7th–8th

Source: AHF

20 August; 18:00	Hong Kong	15–40	South Korea	POPKI Sports Hall, Jakarta; Referees: Al-Saqer, Al-Suqufi (KSA)
20 August; 18:00	Tse 4	(7–21)	Jang, Hwang 7	POPKI Sports Hall, Jakarta; Referees: Al-Saqer, Al-Suqufi (KSA)
20 August; 18:00	3× (yellow card) 1× (suspension)		1× (yellow card)	POPKI Sports Hall, Jakarta; Referees: Al-Saqer, Al-Suqufi (KSA)

22 August; 18:00	Iran	46–20	Hong Kong	POPKI Sports Hall, Jakarta; Referees: Al-Wahibi, Al-Shahi (OMA)
22 August; 18:00	Nosrati 12	(18–10)	Tse 7	POPKI Sports Hall, Jakarta; Referees: Al-Wahibi, Al-Shahi (OMA)
22 August; 18:00	1× (yellow card) 3× (suspension)		1× (yellow card) 3× (suspension)	POPKI Sports Hall, Jakarta; Referees: Al-Wahibi, Al-Shahi (OMA)

24 August; 14:00	Bahrain	43–19	Hong Kong	POPKI Sports Hall, Jakarta; Referees: Al-Saqer, Al-Suqufi (KSA)
24 August; 14:00	M. Abdulqader 14	(21–11)	Kuo 6	POPKI Sports Hall, Jakarta; Referees: Al-Saqer, Al-Suqufi (KSA)
24 August; 14:00	3× (yellow card)		1× (suspension)	POPKI Sports Hall, Jakarta; Referees: Al-Saqer, Al-Suqufi (KSA)

Seventh place game

26 August; 16:00	Iraq	31–24	Hong Kong	POPKI Sports Hall, Jakarta; Referees: Lee, Koo (KOR)
26 August; 16:00	M. Abdul-Ridha 7	(15–12)	Ip S. 5	POPKI Sports Hall, Jakarta; Referees: Lee, Koo (KOR)
26 August; 16:00	1× (yellow card) 3× (suspension)		2× (yellow card) 2× (suspension)	POPKI Sports Hall, Jakarta; Referees: Lee, Koo (KOR)

=== Women's tournament ===
Roster

- Chan Kam Ling
- Cheung Mei Ngo
- Cheung Shu Man
- Wong Ching Yu
- Tang Man Ting
- Tsang Mei Yan
- Chung Ka Yu
- Leung Sin Ying
- Tsang Yuen Lam
- Chow Pui Yee
- Wu Lei Ling
- Leung Tsz Hin
- Lam Sze Pui
- Wong Shuk Yee
- Lee Man Nga
- Lam Wai Yu

Group B

Pos	Team	Pld	W	D	L	GF	GA	GD	Pts	Qualification
1	Japan	4	4	0	0	208	38	+170	8	Semifinals
2	Thailand	4	3	0	1	120	93	+27	6	Semifinals
3	Hong Kong	4	2	0	2	112	97	+15	4	Classification 5th–8th
4	Indonesia	4	1	0	3	56	146	−90	2	Classification 5th–8th
5	Malaysia	4	0	0	4	45	167	−122	0	Classification 9th–10th

Source: AHF

16 August; 14:00	Hong Kong	13–41	Japan	POPKI Sports Hall, Jakarta; Referees: Tavakkoli, Valadkhanian (IRI)
16 August; 14:00	Cheung M. 6	(5–18)	Fujita, Akiyama 6	POPKI Sports Hall, Jakarta; Referees: Tavakkoli, Valadkhanian (IRI)
16 August; 14:00	2× (yellow card) 4× (suspension)		3× (yellow card) 2× (suspension)	POPKI Sports Hall, Jakarta; Referees: Tavakkoli, Valadkhanian (IRI)

19 August; 11:00	Thailand	30–24	Hong Kong	POPKI Sports Hall, Jakarta; Referees: Al-Wahibi, Al-Shahi (OMA)
19 August; 11:00	Bunjarern 10	(13–10)	Wu 7	POPKI Sports Hall, Jakarta; Referees: Al-Wahibi, Al-Shahi (OMA)
19 August; 11:00	2× (yellow card) 5× (suspension)		3× (yellow card) 4× (suspension)	POPKI Sports Hall, Jakarta; Referees: Al-Wahibi, Al-Shahi (OMA)

21 August; 20:00	Hong Kong	35–11	Indonesia	POPKI Sports Hall, Jakarta; Referees: Shakir, Kadhim (IRQ)
21 August; 20:00	Wu 12	(17–5)	five players 2	POPKI Sports Hall, Jakarta; Referees: Shakir, Kadhim (IRQ)
21 August; 20:00	1× (yellow card) 2× (suspension)		1× (yellow card) 4× (suspension)	POPKI Sports Hall, Jakarta; Referees: Shakir, Kadhim (IRQ)

23 August; 11:00	Malaysia	15–40	Hong Kong	POPKI Sports Hall, Jakarta; Referees: Al-Saqer, Al-Suqufi (KSA)
23 August; 11:00	Saimi 5	(9–23)	Cheung M. 7	POPKI Sports Hall, Jakarta; Referees: Al-Saqer, Al-Suqufi (KSA)
23 August; 11:00	2× (yellow card) 3× (suspension)			POPKI Sports Hall, Jakarta; Referees: Al-Saqer, Al-Suqufi (KSA)

5–8th place semifinal

25 August; 18:00	Hong Kong	23–35	Kazakhstan	POPKI Sports Hall, Jakarta; Referees: Lee, Lee (KOR)
25 August; 18:00	Cheung M. 7	(9–15)	Ilyina 10	POPKI Sports Hall, Jakarta; Referees: Lee, Lee (KOR)
25 August; 18:00	2× (yellow card) 2× (suspension)		2× (yellow card) 2× (suspension)	POPKI Sports Hall, Jakarta; Referees: Lee, Lee (KOR)

Seventh place game

29 August; 11:00	Indonesia	16–30	Hong Kong	POPKI Sports Hall, Jakarta; Referees: Lee, Lee (KOR)
29 August; 11:00	Baharizki, Apriliani 4	(8–18)	Cheung M. 10	POPKI Sports Hall, Jakarta; Referees: Lee, Lee (KOR)
29 August; 11:00	2× (yellow card) 4× (suspension)		2× (yellow card) 5× (suspension)	POPKI Sports Hall, Jakarta; Referees: Lee, Lee (KOR)

== Judo ==
Hong Kong put up 5 athletes for Judo:

Key:

- 1st number — Ippon
- 2nd number — Waza-ari
- s — Shido

Men

Athlete	Event	Round of 32	Round of 16	Quarterfinals	Semifinals	Repechage	Final / BM	Rank
Athlete	Event	Opposition Result	Opposition Result	Opposition Result	Opposition Result	Opposition Result	Opposition Result	Rank
Yu Kin Ting	–60 kg	S Sithisane (LAO); L 00–10	did not advance					
Chui Chun Sing	–66 kg	Bye	A El-Idrissi (QAT); L 00–10s1	did not advance				
Lee Kwok Wing	–73 kg	K Rebahi (QAT); L 00–01s1	did not advance					

Women

Athlete	Event	Round of 32	Round of 16	Quarterfinals	Semifinals	Repechage	Final / BM	Rank
Athlete	Event	Opposition Result	Opposition Result	Opposition Result	Opposition Result	Opposition Result	Opposition Result	Rank
Tsui Shuk Ki	–52 kg	Bye	G Gantsetseg (MGL); L 00s1–10s1	did not advance				
Leung Po Sum	–57 kg	Bye	M Kurayoshi (PHI); W 10–00s1	S Nishanbayeva (KAZ); L 00s1–01s2	Did not advance	D Sumiyaa (MGL); L 00s2–10s1	did not advance	

== Karate ==
Hong Kong put-up seven karate practitioners (3 men's and 4 women's) that competed in the kata and kumite events.

== Paragliding ==
Men

Athlete	Event	Round										Total	Rank
Athlete	Event	1	2	3	4	5	6	7	8	9	10	Total	Rank
Wong Pak Shing	Individual accuracy	9	436	14	4	~~500~~	8	500	500	6	7	1484	23
Eric Yam	Individual accuracy	4	49	87	255	179	10	~~500~~	9	193	29	815	16
Chiu Ho Nam; Qian Mingwei; Vong Kam Meng; Wong Pak Shing; Eric Yam	Cross-country	1181	678	1863	243	537	—N/a					4502	7

Women

Athlete	Event	Round					Total	Rank
Athlete	Event	1	2	3	4	5	Total	Rank
Choi Lai Yin	Cross-country	101	174	0	0	0	275	9

== Roller sports ==
=== Skateboarding ===
Athlete	Event	Preliminary		Final	
Athlete	Event	Result	Rank	Result	Rank
Luk Chun Yin	Men's street	9.4	18	did not advance	
Johnnie Tang	Men's street	13.9	16	did not advance	

=== Speed skating ===
Athlete	Event	Final	
Athlete	Event	Time	Rank
Karinne Tam	Women's road 20 km race	EL	12
Venessa Wong	Women's road 20 km race	EL	11

== Rowing ==
Men

Athlete	Event	Heats		Repechage		Final	
Athlete	Event	Time	Rank	Time	Rank	Time	Rank
Chan Chi Fung	Single sculls	8:10.90	3 R	7:49.57	2 FA	7:48.63	5
Chiu Hin Chun	Lightweight single sculls	7:27.24	2 R	8:06.56	1 FA	7:14.16	2nd place, silver medalist(s)
Lam San Tung; Tang Chiu Mang; Leung Chun Shek; Wong Wai Kin	Lightweight coxless four	7:10.11	3 R	7:02.74	3 FA	6:53.72	5
Kenneth Liu; Chau Yee Ping; James Wong; Tang Chiu Mang; Lam San Tung; Yuen Yun Lam; Leung Chun Shek; Wong Wai Kin; Cheung Ming Hang	Lightweight eight	6:17.11	2 R	6:18.39	2 FA	6:14.46	3rd place, bronze medalist(s)

Women

Athlete	Event	Heats		Repechage		Final	
Athlete	Event	Time	Rank	Time	Rank	Time	Rank
Winne Hung	Single sculls	9:35.94	4 R	8:49.77	3 FB	8:41.50	8
Lee Ka Man	Lightweight single sculls	8:35.36	3 FA	—N/a		8:27.21	3rd place, bronze medalist(s)
Loo Ka Fu; Wong Sheung Yee; Hui Wing Ki; Lee Yuen Yin	Lightweight quadruple sculls	7:46.88	3 R	7:38.08	5	Did not advance	7

== Rugby sevens ==
Hong Kong rugby sevens men's and women's team competed at the Games in group A respectively.

Team	Event	Group Stage				Quarterfinal	Semifinal / Pl.	Final / BM / Pl.	
Team	Event	Opposition score	Opposition score	Opposition score	Rank	Opposition score	Opposition score	Opposition score	Rank
Hong Kong men's	Men's tournament	Pakistan; W 64–5	China; W 42–17	Thailand; W 36–7	1 Q	Thailand; W 52–0	South Korea; W 19–7	Japan; W 14–0	1st place, gold medalist(s)
Hong Kong women's	Women's tournament	Singapore; W 26–7	China; L 7–32	South Korea; W 38–0	2 Q	Thailand; L 5–17	Indonesia; W 51–0	Singapore; W 45–0	5

=== Men's tournament ===
Squad

The following is the Hong Kong squad in the men's rugby sevens tournament of the 2018 Asian Games.

Head coach: (United Kingdom) Paul John

- Lee Ross Jones
- Michael Richard Coverdale
- Max John Woodward
- Liam Thomas Herbert
- James Paul Hood
- Hugo Eden Stiles
- Alessandro Nardoni
- Max Cameron Denmark
- Benjamin Reihana Rimene
- Eric Kwok
- Cado Lee
- Salom Yiu

Group A

Pos	Team	Pld	W	D	L	PF	PA	PD	Pts	Qualification
1	Hong Kong	3	3	0	0	142	29	+113	9	Quarterfinals
2	China	3	2	0	1	110	49	+61	7	Quarterfinals
3	Thailand	3	1	0	2	57	76	−19	5	Quarterfinals
4	Pakistan	3	0	0	3	5	160	−155	3	Ranking round 9–12

Source: Results

30 August
12:50

Hong Kong	64–5	Pakistan
Try: Yiu (3) 1' m, 3' c, 7' c Jones (2) 5' c, 7+' m Denmark (3) 10' c, 12' c, 14+' c Woodward 13' c Lee 14' c Con: Rimene (4/6); Hood (2/3); Herbert (1/1)		Try: Aslam 9' m Con: Akram (0/1)

Gelora Bung Karno Rugby Field, Jakarta
Referee: Charlie Brown (Ireland)

30 August
16:30

Hong Kong	42–17	China
Try: Rimene (2) 1' c, 7+' c Yiu 3' c Nardoni (2) 6' c, 9' c Denmark 11' c Con: Rimene (5/5); Hood (1/1)		Try: Shan (2) 4' m, 13' m Liu J. 14+' c Con: Ma (0/2); Shan (1/1)

Gelora Bung Karno Rugby Field, Jakarta
Referee: Suguru Kamamuta (Japan)

31 August
13:12

Hong Kong	36–7	Thailand
Try: Herbert 2' c Yiu 3' c Jones (2) 7+' m, 14' m Rimene 11' m Coverdale 12' c Con: Hood (1/1); Rimene (2/5)		Try: Janda 6' c Con: Khamkoet (1/1)

Gelora Bung Karno Rugby Field, Jakarta
Referee: Noriaki Hashimoto (Japan)

Quarterfinal

31 August
18:20

Hong Kong	52–0	Thailand
Try: Yiu 1' c Hood (2) 2' c, 7+' m Nardoni 6' c Denmark (2) 8' c, 14' m Jones 10' c Kwok 13' c Con: Hood (2/3); Rimene (3/3); Stiles (1/2)

Gelora Bung Karno Rugby Field, Jakarta
Referee: Suguru Kamamuta (Japan)

Semifinal

1 September
17:18

South Korea	7–19	Hong Kong
Try: Jang J. 8' c Con: Lee (1/1)		Try: Lee (2) 5' c, 7' c Rimene 11' m Con: Hood (1/2); Rimene (1/1)

Gelora Bung Karno Rugby Field, Jakarta
Referee: Suguru Kamamuta (Japan)

Gold medal game

1 September
21:06

Japan	0–14	Hong Kong
		Try: Yiu 2' c Nardoni 7+' c Con: Rimene (2/2)

Gelora Bung Karno Rugby Field, Jakarta
Referee: Matthew Rodden (New Zealand)

=== Women's tournament ===
Squad

The following is the Hong Kong squad in the women's rugby sevens tournament of the 2018 Asian Games.

Head coach: (New Zealand) Kevin John West

- Stephanie Chor Ki Chan
- Tsz Ching Chan
- Christy Ka Chi Cheng
- Chong Ka Yan
- Jessica Wai On Ho
- Kwong Sau Yan
- Melody Blessing Nim Yan Li
- Nam Ka Man
- Natasha Shangwe Olson-Thorne
- Poon Hoi Yan
- Poon Pak Yan
- Yuen Lok Yee

Group A

Pos	Team	Pld	W	D	L	PF	PA	PD	Pts	Qualification
1	China	3	3	0	0	142	7	+135	9	Quarterfinals
2	Hong Kong	3	2	0	1	71	39	+32	7	Quarterfinals
3	Singapore	3	1	0	2	29	84	−55	5	Quarterfinals
4	South Korea	3	0	0	3	17	129	−112	3	Quarterfinals

Source: Results

30 August
11:22

Hong Kong	26–7	Singapore
Try: Kwong 2' c Olson-Thorne 6' c V. Poon 9' m Chong 10' c Con: V. Poon (2/3); Chong (1/1)		Try: Low 14+' c Con: Lim (1/1)

Gelora Bung Karno Rugby Field, Jakarta
Referee: Suguru Kamamuta (Japan)

30 August
15:02

China	32–7	Hong Kong
Try: Chen K. (2) 1' m, 9' m Yu X. 4' m Yan 7+' m Liu 12' c Yu L. 13' m Con: Yu X. (1/4); Chen K. (0/1); Chen M. (0/1)		Try: A. Poon 14' c Con: A. Poon (1/1)

Gelora Bung Karno Rugby Field, Jakarta
Referee: Sakurako Kawasaki (Japan)

31 August
10:52

Hong Kong	38–0	South Korea
Try: Kwong 1' c Olson-Thorne 3' c Chong (2) 5' m, 7' c S. Chan 12' c V. Poon 14' m Con: S. Chan (4/6)

Gelora Bung Karno Rugby Field, Jakarta
Referee: Charlie Brown (Ireland)

Quarterfinal

31 August
15:46

Hong Kong	5–17	Thailand
Try: V. Poon 6' m Con: S. Chan (0/1)		Try: Huankid 2' m Chomphumee 10' c Yusri 12' m Con: Bunrak (0/2); Sawatnam (1/1)

Gelora Bung Karno Rugby Field, Jakarta
Referee: Ai Yoshida (Japan)

Classification semifinal (5–8)

1 September
14:44

Indonesia	0–51	Hong Kong
		Try: A. Chan 3' m S. Chan (3) 4' c, 10' m, 14+' c Ho 6' m Nam 7+' m Chong 9' c Kwong 11' m Olson-Thorne 13' m Con: S. Chan (3/9)

Gelora Bung Karno Rugby Field, Jakarta
Referee: Phoenix Xu (China)

Fifth place game

1 September
19:08

Hong Kong	45–0	Singapore
Try: Olson-Thorne (2) 3' m, 14' c Kwong 7' c Chong 7+' m A. Poon 10' c S. Chan 13' c Nam 14+' c Con: S. Chan (3/5); A. Poon (2/2)

Gelora Bung Karno Rugby Field, Jakarta
Referee: Phoenix Xu (China)

== Sailing ==
Men

Athlete	Event	Race															Total	Rank
Athlete	Event	1	2	3	4	5	6	7	8	9	10	11	12	13	14	15	Total	Rank
Michael Cheng	RS:X	~~(4)~~	2	1	4	4	2	2	2	2	2	4	1	2	1	3	32	2nd place, silver medalist(s)
Nicholas Bezy	Laser	8	5	7	4	7	4	6	7	~~(17)~~; DSQ	7	17; RET	3	—N/a			75	7
Cheung Ka Ho; Tse Siu Kit	49er	6	7	5	7	7	7	6	8	7	6	6	7	8	4	~~(10)~~; DNC	91	7
Tse Sui Lun; Bernard Kay	470	~~(8)~~	8	6	8	6	7	7	6	6	7	6	8	—N/a			75	7

Women

Athlete	Event	Race															Total	Rank
Athlete	Event	1	2	3	4	5	6	7	8	9	10	11	12	13	14	15	Total	Rank
Hayley Chan	RS:X	1	2	1	2	2	1	2	1	~~(3)~~	3	2	2	2	2	1	24	2nd place, silver medalist(s)
Molly Highfield	Laser Radial	8	8	7	9	7	8	~~(10)~~	6	8	8	5	7	—N/a			81	8
Tong Kit Fong; Anna Fisher	470	6	6	5	6	5	3	5	6	~~(7)~~	7	5	6	—N/a			60	6

Mixed

Athlete	Event	Race															Total	Rank
Athlete	Event	1	2	3	4	5	6	7	8	9	10	11	12	13	14	15	Total	Rank
Rafeek Kikabhoy; Ma Kwan Ching	RS:One	4	5	3	3	3	3	4	2	4	4	6	~~(7)~~	6	7	5	59	2nd place, silver medalist(s)

== Shooting ==
Men

Athlete	Event	Qualification		Final	
Athlete	Event	Points	Rank	Points	Rank
Man Chun Kit	10 m air pistol	568	26	did not advance	
Wong Siu Lung	10 m air pistol	565	30	did not advance	

Women

Athlete	Event	Qualification		Final	
Athlete	Event	Points	Rank	Points	Rank
Lo Ka Kay	10 m air pistol	557	26	did not advance	
Shing Ho Ching	10 m air pistol	569	10	did not advance	

Mixed team

Athlete	Event	Qualification		Final	
Athlete	Event	Points	Rank	Points	Rank
Wong Siu Lung; Shing Ho Ching	10 m air pistol	758	7	did not advance	

== Softball ==
Summary

Team	Event	Group Stage		Semifinal	Bronze medal game	Final	
Team	Event	Opposition Score	Rank	Opposition Score	Opposition Score	Opposition Score	Rank
Hong Kong women's	Women's tournament	South Korea: L 1–5; Philippines: L 0–7; China: L 0–10; Japan: L 0–14; Chinese Taipei: L 1–6; Indonesia: L 0–13	7	did not advance			

Roster

- Courtney Chan
- Chan Ho Kei
- Chan Yin Yu
- Chen Sie Lam
- Hui Kai Yan
- Ku Oi Yu
- Lam Pui Kwan
- Lau Hiu Kwan
- Lau Hiu Man
- Lau Yu Yan
- Leung Hiu Tung
- Leung Tsz Yan
- Ng Yan Wa
- Pong Yui Chi
- Tang Wai San
- Wong Cho Hei
- Marcia Ka-yan Wong

Preliminary round

Final round
Eliminated

The top four teams will advance to the Final round.

Team	W	L	RS	RA	WIN%	GB	Tiebreaker
Japan	6	0	59	3	1.000	–	
China	4	2	30	16	0.667	2	1–1; RA = 1
Philippines	4	2	20	17	0.667	2	1–1; RA = 3
Chinese Taipei	4	2	27	13	0.667	2	1–1; RA = 7
South Korea	2	4	15	23	0.333	4	
Indonesia	1	5	15	41	0.167	5	
Hong Kong	0	6	2	55	0.000	6	

August 19; 10:00	Hong Kong	1–5	South Korea	GBK Softball field
August 19; 10:00		Boxscore		GBK Softball field

August 19; 20:00	Philippines	7–0	Hong Kong	GBK Softball field
August 19; 20:00		Boxscore		GBK Softball field

August 20; 12:30	China	10–0	Hong Kong	GBK Softball field
August 20; 12:30		Boxscore		GBK Softball field

August 21; 12:30	Hong Kong	0–14	Japan	GBK Softball field
August 21; 12:30		Boxscore		GBK Softball field

August 22; 15:00	Chinese Taipei	6–1	Hong Kong	GBK Softball field
August 22; 15:00		Boxscore		GBK Softball field

August 23; 10:00	Hong Kong	0–13	Indonesia	GBK Softball field
August 23; 10:00		Boxscore		GBK Softball field

== Sport climbing ==
Speed

Athlete	Event	Qualification		Round of 16	Quarterfinals	Semifinals	Final / BM	
Athlete	Event	Best	Rank	Opposition Time	Opposition Time	Opposition Time	Opposition Time	Rank
Au Chi Fung	Men's	7.327	14 Q	Sabri (INA); L 7.188–6.224	did not advance			11
Shoji Chan	Men's	8.114	20	did not advance				

Speed relay

Athlete	Event	Qualification		Quarterfinals	Semifinals	Final / BM	
Athlete	Event	Time	Rank	Opposition Time	Opposition Time	Opposition Time	Rank
Au Chi Fung; Shoji Chan; Lam Hei Yeung; Yau Ka Chun	Men's	26.122	9	did not advance			

Combined

Athlete	Event	Qualification					Final				
Athlete	Event	Speed Point	Boulder Point	Lead Point	Total	Rank	Speed Point	Boulder Point	Lead Point	Total	Rank
Au Chi Fung	Men's	5	8	7	280	5 Q	6	6	5	180	6
Shoji Chan	Men's	11	7	10	770	11	did not advance				

== Squash ==
Singles

Athlete	Event	Round of 32	Round of 16	Quarterfinals	Semifinals	Final	
Athlete	Event	Opposition score	Opposition score	Opposition score	Opposition score	Opposition score	Rank
Leo Au	Men's	T Endo (JPN); W 3–0	A Wilant (INA); W 3–0	I Yuen (MAS); W 3–0	S Ghosal (IND); W 3–2	M Lee (HKG); W 3–1	1st place, gold medalist(s)
Max Lee	Men's	A T Magar (NEP); W 3–0	S Zareian (IRI); W 3–0	A Al-Tamimi (KUW); W 3–0	M N Adnan (MAS); W 3–2	L Au (HKG); L 1–3	2nd place, silver medalist(s)
Annie Au	Women's	Bye	Y A Dalida (PHI); W 3–0	S Subramaniam (MAS); L 2–3	did not advance		
Joey Chan	Women's	T Thamronglarp (THA); W 3–0	Ahn E-t (KOR); W 3–0	J Chinappa (IND); L 1–3	did not advance		

Team

Athlete	Event	Group Stage						Semifinal	Final	
Athlete	Event	Opposition Score	Opposition Score	Opposition Score	Opposition Score	Opposition Score	Rank	Opposition Score	Opposition Score	Rank
Max Lee; Leo Au; Yip Tsz Fung; Henry Leung	Men's	Philippines (PHI); W 3–0	Japan (JPN); W 3–0	South Korea (KOR); W 3–0	Pakistan (PAK); W 3–0	Nepal (NEP); W 3–0	1 Q	India (IND); W 2–0	Malaysia (MAS); L 1–2	2nd place, silver medalist(s)
Annie Au; Joey Chan; Ho Tze-Lok; Lee Ka Yi	Women's	Indonesia (INA); W 3–0	Iran (IRI); W 3–0	China (CHN); W 3–0	Thailand (THA); W 3–0	India (IND); W 2–1	1 Q	Japan (JPN); W 2–0	India (IND); W 2–0	1st place, gold medalist(s)

== Swimming ==
=== Men ===
Event	Athlete	Heats		Final	
Event	Athlete	Time	Rank	Time	Rank
50 m freestyle	Jeremy Wong	23.85	30	did not advance	
50 m freestyle	Kenneth To	22.38	2 Q	22.54	5
100 m freestyle	Jeremy Wong	51.09	24	did not advance	
100 m freestyle	Kenneth To	49.89	9	did not advance	
200 m freestyle	Chan Chun Hei	1:54.59	23	did not advance	
200 m freestyle	Kent Cheung	1:54.90	25	did not advance	
400 m freestyle	Chan Chun Hei	4:05.80	16	did not advance	
400 m freestyle	Cheuk Ming Ho	3:55.13	10	did not advance	
800 m freestyle	Cheuk Ming Ho	—N/a		8:07.76	7
800 m freestyle	Lam Chak Hang	—N/a		8:26.07	13
1500 m freestyle	Cheuk Ming Ho	—N/a		15:38.16	9
1500 m freestyle	Lam Chak Hang	—N/a		16:11.50	13
50 m backstroke	Cheung Yau Ming	26.99	23	did not advance	
50 m backstroke	Lau Shiu Yue	26.93	22	did not advance	
100 m backstroke	Cheung Yau Ming	59.14	19	did not advance	
100 m backstroke	Lau Shiu Yue	58.38	17	did not advance	
200 m backstroke	Cheung Yau Ming	2:06.78	11	did not advance	
200 m backstroke	Marcus Mok	2:10.37	14	did not advance	
50 m breaststroke	Ng Yan Kin	29.28	19	did not advance	
50 m breaststroke	Wong Chun Yan	31.65	29	did not advance	
100 m breaststroke	Ng Yan Kin	1:04.21	21	did not advance	
100 m breaststroke	Boris Yang	1:03.77	19	did not advance	
200 m breaststroke	Marcus Mok	2:17.18	13	did not advance	
200 m breaststroke	Boris Yang	2:16.83	=10	did not advance	
50 m butterfly	Ho Tin Long	25.09	23	did not advance	
50 m butterfly	Derick Ng	25.42	27	did not advance	
100 m butterfly	Ho Tin Long	55.05	20	did not advance	
100 m butterfly	Nicholas Lim	54.67	15	did not advance	
200 m butterfly	Ho Tin Long	2:05.17	13	did not advance	
200 m butterfly	Nicholas Lim	2:02.70	10	did not advance	
200 m individual medley	Raymond Mak	2:07.13	13	did not advance	
200 m individual medley	Kenneth To	2:02.50	6 Q	2:01.76	5
400 m individual medley	Jonathan Liao	4:41.60	14	did not advance	
400 m individual medley	Marcus Mok	4:33.46	13	did not advance	
4 × 100 m freestyle relay	Kent Cheung; Raymond Mak; Derick Ng; Jeremy Wong	3:25.50	9	did not advance	
4 × 200 m freestyle relay	Chan Chun Hei; Cheuk Ming Ho; Kent Cheung; Jonathan Liao	7:43.57	8 Q	DSQ	
4 × 100 m medley relay	Lau Shiu Yue; Kenneth To; Nicholas Lim; Jeremy Wong; Boris Yang	3:44.16	8 Q	3:44.61	8

=== Women ===
Event	Athlete	Heats		Final	
Event	Athlete	Time	Rank	Time	Rank
50 m freestyle	Stephanie Au	26.04	8 Q	25.86	8
50 m freestyle	Hoi Lam Tam	26.18	10	did not advance	
100 m freestyle	Ho Nam Wai	57.06	10	did not advance	
100 m freestyle	Camille Cheng	56.47	7 Q	55.39	5
200 m freestyle	Camille Cheng	2:01.68	4 Q	2:01.95	6
200 m freestyle	Ho Nam Wai	2:04.05	11	did not advance	
400 m freestyle	Ho Nam Wai				
400 m freestyle	Sze Hang Yu				
800 m freestyle	Ho Nam Wai				
800 m freestyle	Lam Hoi Kiu				
1500 m freestyle	Ho Nam Wai				
1500 m freestyle	Lam Hoi Kiu				
50 m backstroke	Stephanie Au				
50 m backstroke	Toto Wong				
100 m backstroke	Stephanie Au				
100 m backstroke	Toto Wong				
200 m backstroke	Claudia Lau				
200 m backstroke	Toto Wong				
50 m breaststroke	Rainbow Ip				
50 m breaststroke	Yvette Kong				
100 m breaststroke	Rainbow Ip				
100 m breaststroke	Yvette Kong				
200 m breaststroke	Wang Chin Lam				
200 m breaststroke	Jamie Yeung				
50 m butterfly	Chan Kin Lok				
50 m butterfly	Sze Hang Yu				
100 m butterfly	Chan Kin Lok				
100 m butterfly	Sze Hang Yu				
200 m butterfly	Karen Liu				
200 m butterfly	Katii Tang				
200 m individual medley	Natalie Kan				
200 m individual medley	Jamie Yeung				
400 m individual medley	Karen Liu				
400 m individual medley	Lam Hoi Kiu				
4 × 100 m freestyle relay	Stephanie Au; Camille Cheng; Ho Nam Wai; Sze Hang Yu				
4 × 200 m freestyle relay	Camille Cheng; Ho Nam Wai; Sze Hang Yu; Katii Tang				
4 × 100 m medley relay	Stephanie Au; Yvette Kong; Chan Kin Lok; Camille Cheng				

=== Mixed ===
Event	Athlete	Heats		Final	
Event	Athlete	Time	Rank	Time	Rank
4 × 100 m medley relay	Marcus Mok; Kenneth To; Chan Kin Lok; Camille Cheng				

== Table tennis ==
Individual

Athlete	Event	Round 1	Round 2	Round of 16	Quarterfinals	Semifinals	Final	
Athlete	Event	Opposition score	Opposition score	Opposition score	Opposition score	Opposition score	Opposition score	Rank
Ho Kwan Kit	Men's singles	Bye	Nguyễn ĐT (VIE); W 4–2	Fan ZD (CHN); L 1–4	did not advance			
Wong Chun Ting	Men's singles	Bye	JM Nayre (PHI); W 4–1	Chen C-a (TPE); W 4–2	N Alamian (IRI); L 1–4	did not advance		
Doo Hoi Kem	Women's singles	Bye	N Shrestha (NEP); W 4–0	Yu MY (SGP); L 3–4	did not advance			
Lee Ho Ching	Women's singles	Bye	D Batbayar (MGL); W 4–0	S Sawettabut (THA); W 4–0	Chen M (CHN); L 0–4	did not advance		
Ho Kwan Kit; Lee Ho Ching	Mixed doubles	Bye	M Hamie / M Khory (LBN); W 3–0	A Amalraj / M Patkar (IND); W 3–1	Chen C-a / Cheng I-c (TPE); W 3–0	Lin GY / Wang MY (CHN); L 0–4	Did not advance	3rd place, bronze medalist(s)
Wong Chun Ting; Doo Hoi Kem	Mixed doubles	Bye	AL Malla / S Nembang (NEP); W 3–0	Gao N / Yu MY (SGP); L 1–3	did not advance			

Team

Athlete	Event	Group Stage					Quarterfinal	Semifinal	Final	
Athlete	Event	Opposition Score	Opposition Score	Opposition Score	Opposition Score	Rank	Opposition Score	Opposition Score	Opposition Score	Rank
Wong Chun Ting; Ho Kwan Kit; Jiang Tianyi; Ng Pak Nam; Lam Siu Hang	Men's	Yemen (YEM); W 3–0	South Korea (KOR); L 2–3	Mongolia (MGL); W 3–0	Indonesia (INA); W 3–0	2 Q	China (CHN); L 0–3	did not advance		
Doo Hoi Kem; Lee Ho Ching; Li Ching Wan; Ng Wing Nam; Minnie Soo Wai Yam	Women's	Vietnam (VIE); W 3–0	Malaysia (MAS); W 3–0	Singapore (SGP); W 3–1	Nepal (NEP); W 3–0	1 Q	India (IND); W 3–1	North Korea (PRK); L 0–3	Did not advance	3rd place, bronze medalist(s)

== Taekwondo ==
Poomsae

Athlete	Event	Round of 16	Quarterfinal	Semifinal	Final	
Athlete	Event	Opposition Score	Opposition Score	Opposition Score	Opposition Score	Rank
Choy Cheuk Yin	Men's individual	Chew Wei Yan (MAS); L 7.55–8.02	did not advance			
Wong Ka Yiu	Women's individual	Defia Rosmaniar (INA); L 7.69–8.22	did not advance			
Cheung Kar Yue; Wong Ka Yiu; Ng Chiu Ling	Women's team	Philippines; L 7.49–8.00	did not advance			

Kyorugi

Athlete	Event	Round of 32	Round of 16	Quarterfinal	Semifinal	Final	
Athlete	Event	Opposition Score	Opposition Score	Opposition Score	Opposition Score	Opposition Score	Rank
Chu Kai Ching	Men's −68 kg	Lý Hồng Phúc (VIE); L 2–11	did not advance				
Lam Siu Wai	Women's −49 kg	Bye	Madinabonu Mannopova (UZB); L 8–20	did not advance			
Law Sin Yi	Women's −53 kg	Aneila Aysha Afsar (PAK); W 12–6	Latika Bhandari (IND); W 24–22	Su Po-ya (TPE); L 4–38	did not advance		
Vincy Lo	Women's −67 kg	—N/a	Nigora Tursunkulova (UZB); L 2–22	did not advance			

== Tennis ==
Men

Athlete	Event	Round of 64	Round of 32	Round of 16	Quarterfinals	Semifinals	Final	
Athlete	Event	Opposition score	Opposition score	Opposition score	Opposition score	Opposition score	Opposition score	Rank
Anthony Jackie Tang	Singles	F Soares Sarmento (TLS); W 6–0, 6–0	Kwon S-w (KOR); L 0–6, 1–6	did not advance				
Wong Hong-kit	Singles	J Al-Mutawa (QAT); W 6–3, 6–3	R Ramanathan (IND); L 0–6, 6–7^{4–7}	did not advance				
Anthony Jackie Tang; Wong Hong-kit	Doubles	Bye	Kwon S-w / Lim Y-k (KOR); L 1–6, 7–5, [7–10]	did not advance				
Wong Chun-hun; Yeung Pak-long	Doubles	Bye	M Kargaranoroochi / S Khaledan (IRI); W 6–4, 6–2	Y Ito / Y Watanuki (JPN); L 4–6, 4–6	did not advance			

Women

Athlete	Event	Round of 64	Round of 32	Round of 16	Quarterfinals	Semifinals	Final	
Athlete	Event	Opposition score	Opposition score	Opposition score	Opposition score	Opposition score	Opposition score	Rank
Eudice Chong	Singles	M Rana (NEP); W 6–0, 6–1	L Kumkhum (THA); W 4–6, 7–6^{8–6}, 7–6^{7–1}	Chang K-c (TPE); W 6–0, 6–2	A Raina (IND); L 4–6, 1–6	did not advance		
Zhang Ling	Singles	Bye	K Palkina (KGZ); WO	S Sharipova (UZB); W 7–5, 3–6, 7–5	Liang E-s (TPE); L 2–6, 0–6	did not advance		
Ng Kwan-yau; Wu Ho-ching	Doubles	—N/a	D Detkovskaya / Z Kulambayeva (KAZ); L 2–6, 3–6	did not advance				

Mixed

Athlete	Event	Round of 64	Round of 32	Round of 16	Quarterfinals	Semifinals	Final	
Athlete	Event	Opposition score	Opposition score	Opposition score	Opposition score	Opposition score	Opposition score	Rank
Eudice Chong; Wong Chun-hun	Doubles	Bye	A Mathema / S Bajracharya (NEP); W 6–1, 6–0	A Raina / R Bopanna (IND); L 4–6, 4–6	did not advance			
Zhang Ling; Yeung Pak-long	Doubles	Bye	M Rana / P Khanal (NEP); W 6–0, 6–1	Yang ZX / Gong MX (CHN); W 4–6, 6–4, [10–7]	L Kumkhum / So Ratiwatana (THA); L 5–7, 3–6	did not advance		

== Triathlon ==
Individual

Athlete	Event	Swim (1.5 km)	Trans 1	Bike (39.6 km)	Trans 2	Run (10 km)	Total Time	Rank
Law Leong Tim	Men's	19:52	0:28	57:22	0:29		DNF	–
Wong Hui Wai	Men's	18:52	0:24	56:36	0:20	37:40	1:53:52	8
Bailee Brown	Women's	21:15	0:25	1:01:14	0:25		DNF	–
Choi Yan Yin	Women's	21:17	0:28	1:01:04	0:24	41:18	2:04:31	6

Mixed relay

Athletes	Event	Total Times per Athlete (Swim 300 m, Bike 6.3 km, Run 2.1 km)	Total Group Time	Rank
Bailee Brown; Choi Yan Yin; Law Leong Tim; Wong Tsz To	Mixed relay	24:01; 24:28; 22:11; 22:24	1:33:04	3rd place, bronze medalist(s)

== Beach volleyball ==
Athlete	Event	Preliminary		Round of 16	Quarterfinals	Semifinals	Final / BM	
Athlete	Event	Oppositions scores	Rank	Opposition score	Opposition score	Opposition score	Opposition score	Rank
Chui Kam Lung; Yeung Pok Man	Men's tournament	Al-Jalbubi – Al-Hashmi (OMA): L 0–2; Ahmed – Adam (MDV): W 2–0; Inkiew – Padsawud (THA): L 0–2	3	did not advance				
Kelvin Lau; Wong Pui Lam	Men's tournament	Ramadhan – Pribadi (INA): L 0–2; Hossain – Ali (BAN): L 0–2; Alarqan – Al-Qishawi (PLE): L 0–2	4	did not advance				
Yuen Ting Chi; Au Yeung Wai Yan	Women's tournament	Kou – Liu (TPE): L 0–2; Wang – Xia (CHN): L 0–2; Kim H-j – Kim H-n (KOR): W 2–0	3 Q	Wang – Zeng (CHN); L 0–2	did not advance			
Wong Yuen Mei; Ng Tin Lai	Women's tournament	Juliana – Utami (INA): L 0–2; Radarong – Udomchavee (THA): L 0–2; Nguyen – Huynh (VIE):W 2–1; Mashkova – Tsimbalova (KAZ): L 0–2	4	did not advance				

== Volleyball ==
Hong Kong men's and women's indoor volleyball teams competed at the Games in group F and A respectively.

Team	Event	Group Stage		Playoffs	Quarterfinals / Pl.	Semifinals / Pl.	Final / BM / Pl.	
Team	Event	Oppositions scores	Rank	Opposition score	Opposition score	Opposition score	Opposition score	Rank
Hong Kong men's	Men's tournament	India: L 0–3; Maldives: W 3–0; Qatar: L 0–3	3	Did not advance	Vietnam; L 1–3	Did not advance	Maldives; W 3–0	19
Hong Kong women's	Women's tournament	Indonesia: L 1–3; Philippines: L 0–3; Thailand: L 0–3; Japan: L 0–3	5	—N/a	did not advance		India; L 0–3	11

=== Men's tournament ===
Team roster

The following is the Hong Kong roster in the men's volleyball tournament of the 2018 Asian Games.

Head coach: Yau Hok Chun

No.	Name	Date of birth	Height	Weight	Spike	Block	Club
1	Lam Ki Fung	12 September 1994	2.01 m (6 ft 7 in)	90 kg (200 lb)	325 cm (128 in)	315 cm (124 in)	(Hong Kong) Yan Chai
2	Au Chin To	13 February 1996	1.87 m (6 ft 2 in)	87 kg (192 lb)	318 cm (125 in)	309 cm (122 in)	(Hong Kong) Dragon
3	Siu Cheong Hung (c)	26 January 1993	1.90 m (6 ft 3 in)	80 kg (180 lb)	320 cm (130 in)	315 cm (124 in)	(Hong Kong) Dragon
4	Leung Ho Yin	26 September 1998	1.84 m (6 ft 0 in)	80 kg (180 lb)			(Hong Kong) Dragon
8	Lee Man Sing	30 January 1989	1.87 m (6 ft 2 in)	80 kg (180 lb)	325 cm (128 in)	315 cm (124 in)	(Hong Kong) Yan Chai
9	Chung Wai Sze	4 September 1991	1.87 m (6 ft 2 in)	80 kg (180 lb)	320 cm (130 in)	315 cm (124 in)	(Hong Kong) Dragon
10	Wong Hei Chun	26 December 1986	1.77 m (5 ft 10 in)	67 kg (148 lb)	310 cm (120 in)	295 cm (116 in)	(Hong Kong) Yan Chai
11	Sin Ka Chun	23 July 1991	1.70 m (5 ft 7 in)	68 kg (150 lb)	288 cm (113 in)	274 cm (108 in)	
12	Wu Lok Kan	22 January 1994	1.95 m (6 ft 5 in)	85 kg (187 lb)	335 cm (132 in)	320 cm (130 in)	(Hong Kong) SCAA
14	Edmond Chiu	4 February 1996	1.73 m (5 ft 8 in)	68 kg (150 lb)			
15	Luk Chun Ho	13 November 1991	1.87 m (6 ft 2 in)	80 kg (180 lb)	320 cm (130 in)	310 cm (120 in)	
16	Poon Chi Leung	30 January 1997	1.88 m (6 ft 2 in)	80 kg (180 lb)	317 cm (125 in)	303 cm (119 in)	(Hong Kong) Aspiring
18	Yau Tze Ching	19 June 1994	1.93 m (6 ft 4 in)	85 kg (187 lb)	325 cm (128 in)	320 cm (130 in)	(Hong Kong) Dragon
20	Man Chun Hin	24 October 1995	1.79 m (5 ft 10 in)	71 kg (157 lb)	318 cm (125 in)	315 cm (124 in)	

Pool F

Pos	Team	Pld	W	L	Pts	SW	SL	SR	SPW	SPL	SPR	Qualification
1	Qatar	3	3	0	9	9	0	MAX	225	143	1.573	Classification for 1–12
2	India	3	2	1	6	6	3	2.000	207	191	1.084	Classification for 1–12
3	Hong Kong	3	1	2	3	3	6	0.500	197	206	0.956	Classification for 13–20
4	Maldives	3	0	3	0	0	9	0.000	136	225	0.604	Classification for 13–20

Source: OCA

Date	Time		Score		Set 1	Set 2	Set 3	Set 4	Set 5	Total	Report
20 Aug	16:30	India	3–0	Hong Kong	27–25	25–22	25–19			77–66	Report
23 Aug	19:00	Hong Kong	3–0	Maldives	25–16	25–21	25–17			75–54	Report
24 Aug	19:00	Qatar	3–0	Hong Kong	25–16	25–22	25–18			75–56	Report
26 Aug	12:30	Hong Kong	1–3	Vietnam	14–25	23–25	25–20	13–25		75–95	Report
28 Aug	19:00	Maldives	0–3	Hong Kong	20–25	22–25	16–25			58–75	Report

=== Women's tournament ===
Team roster

The following is the Hong Kong roster in the women's volleyball tournament of the 2018 Asian Games.

Head coach: Kwok Kin Chuen

No.	Name	Date of birth	Height	Weight	Spike	Block	Club
2	Thyllis Law	10 May 1995	1.69 m (5 ft 7 in)	63 kg (139 lb)	261 cm (103 in)	269 cm (106 in)	(Hong Kong) International
3	Fung Tsz Yan	13 July 1994	1.76 m (5 ft 9 in)	67 kg (148 lb)	274 cm (108 in)	266 cm (105 in)	(Hong Kong) Heep Hing
5	Tsang Sze Nga	7 May 1987	1.76 m (5 ft 9 in)	60 kg (130 lb)	286 cm (113 in)	273 cm (107 in)	
6	Chan Eu Eu	1 October 1988	1.55 m (5 ft 1 in)	53 kg (117 lb)	240 cm (94 in)	230 cm (91 in)	(Hong Kong) Kwai Tsing
7	Fung Wing Yan	13 July 1994	1.76 m (5 ft 9 in)	67 kg (148 lb)	275 cm (108 in)	270 cm (110 in)	(Hong Kong) Kwai Tsing
8	Chim Wing Lam	8 November 1997	1.72 m (5 ft 8 in)	61 kg (134 lb)	280 cm (110 in)	265 cm (104 in)	(Hong Kong) Heep Hing
9	Yu Ying Chi	8 July 1992	1.69 m (5 ft 7 in)	64 kg (141 lb)	270 cm (110 in)	265 cm (104 in)	(Hong Kong) Kwai Tsing
11	Yeung Sau Mei (c)	30 August 1985	1.83 m (6 ft 0 in)	67 kg (148 lb)	294 cm (116 in)	276 cm (109 in)	(Hong Kong) International
12	Pang Wing Lam	11 February 1997	1.73 m (5 ft 8 in)	68 kg (150 lb)	275 cm (108 in)	265 cm (104 in)	(Hong Kong) Heep Hing
14	Lam Yee Ting	26 December 1990	1.67 m (5 ft 6 in)	64 kg (141 lb)	273 cm (107 in)	260 cm (100 in)	(Hong Kong) International
15	Ho Kin Yiu	4 March 1996	1.83 m (6 ft 0 in)	66 kg (146 lb)	285 cm (112 in)	275 cm (108 in)	(Hong Kong) Heep Hing
16	Tsui Ka Yee	30 July 1986	1.67 m (5 ft 6 in)	53 kg (117 lb)	270 cm (110 in)	260 cm (100 in)	(Hong Kong) Heep Hing
18	Helen Ip	20 October 1990	1.77 m (5 ft 10 in)	70 kg (150 lb)	281 cm (111 in)	268 cm (106 in)	(Hong Kong) International
20	Ko Yung Yung	22 August 1995	1.78 m (5 ft 10 in)	63 kg (139 lb)	285 cm (112 in)	270 cm (110 in)	(Hong Kong) Heep Hing

Pool A

Pos	Team	Pld	W	L	Pts	SW	SL	SR	SPW	SPL	SPR	Qualification
1	Thailand	4	4	0	12	12	1	12.000	322	221	1.457	Quarterfinals
2	Japan	4	3	1	9	9	3	3.000	290	197	1.472	Quarterfinals
3	Indonesia	4	2	2	6	7	8	0.875	315	328	0.960	Quarterfinals
4	Philippines	4	1	3	3	4	9	0.444	260	310	0.839	Quarterfinals
5	Hong Kong	4	0	4	0	1	12	0.083	190	321	0.592	Classification for 9–11

Source: OCA

Date	Time		Score		Set 1	Set 2	Set 3	Set 4	Set 5	Total	Report
21 Aug	19:00	Hong Kong	1–3	Indonesia	25–21	13–25	18–25	14–25		70–96	Report
23 Aug	12:30	Hong Kong	0–3	Philippines	18–25	21–25	22–25			61–75	Report
25 Aug	16:30	Thailand	3–0	Hong Kong	25–6	25–11	25–20			75–37	Report
27 Aug	10:00	Japan	3–0	Hong Kong	25–4	25–7	25–11			75–22	Report
29 Aug	16:30	Hong Kong	0–3	India	18–25	16–25	13–25			47–75	Report

== Water polo ==
Summary

Key:

- FT – After full-time.
- P – Match decided by penalty-shootout.

Team	Event	Group Stage						Quarterfinal	Semifinal / Pl.	Final / BM / Pl.	
Team	Event	Opposition score	Opposition score	Opposition score	Opposition score	Opposition score	Rank	Opposition score	Opposition score	Opposition score	Rank
Hong Kong men's	Men's tournament	Saudi Arabia; L 6–12	China; L 3–23	Japan; L 0–23	Indonesia; L 8–11	—N/a	5	did not advance			9
Hong Kong women's	Women's tournament	Thailand; L 6–19	Indonesia; L 8–8	Kazakhstan; L 2–22	Japan; W 3–31	China; L 3–16	6	—N/a			6

=== Men's tournament ===
Team roster

Head coach: (China) Zhao Jinwen

1. Yim Wai Ho (GK)
2. Wong Siu Hei (CF)
3. Fung Kong Chun (D)
4. Fung Kong Ching (CF)
5. Kelvin Lo (D)
6. Ip Chun Hong (D)
7. Gilman Choi (CB)
8. Cheng Hei Man (CB) (C)
9. Pin Tak Hei (D)
10. Cheung Tsun Yu (D)
11. Chan Chun Leung (CB)
12. Cheng Hei Chun (CF)
13. Kong Cheuk Kiu (GK)

Group B

Pos	Team	Pld	W	D	L	GF	GA	GD	Pts	Qualification
1	Japan	4	4	0	0	79	15	+64	8	Quarterfinals
2	China	4	3	0	1	63	22	+41	6	Quarterfinals
3	Saudi Arabia	4	1	1	2	33	55	−22	3 (Note: Head-to-head result: KSA 12–12 INA. Goal difference against the highest placed team (JPN): KSA −16, INA −17.)	Quarterfinals
4	Indonesia	4	1	1	2	32	63	−31	3	Quarterfinals
5	Hong Kong	4	0	0	4	17	69	−52	0	

Source: OCA
Notes:

26 August; 15:50	Saudi Arabia	12–6	Hong Kong	Gelora Bung Karno Aquatic Stadium, Jakarta; Referees: Han (KOR), Salnichenko (KAZ)
26 August; 15:50	Score by quarters: 2–1, 4–1, 4–2, 2–2			Gelora Bung Karno Aquatic Stadium, Jakarta; Referees: Han (KOR), Salnichenko (KAZ)
26 August; 15:50	Al-Nefaiei 3	Goals	Cheng H.M. 3	Gelora Bung Karno Aquatic Stadium, Jakarta; Referees: Han (KOR), Salnichenko (KAZ)

27 August; 15:50	China	23–3	Hong Kong	Gelora Bung Karno Aquatic Stadium, Jakarta; Referees: Flahive (AUS), Pranolo (INA)
27 August; 15:50	Score by quarters: 7–0, 6–2, 5–0, 5–1			Gelora Bung Karno Aquatic Stadium, Jakarta; Referees: Flahive (AUS), Pranolo (INA)
27 August; 15:50	four players 3	Goals	Cheng H.M. 3	Gelora Bung Karno Aquatic Stadium, Jakarta; Referees: Flahive (AUS), Pranolo (INA)

28 August; 14:30	Hong Kong	0–23	Japan	Gelora Bung Karno Aquatic Stadium, Jakarta; Referees: Tan (SGP), Han (KOR)
28 August; 14:30	Score by quarters: 0–7, 0–6, 0–5, 0–5			Gelora Bung Karno Aquatic Stadium, Jakarta; Referees: Tan (SGP), Han (KOR)
28 August; 14:30	0	Goals	Adachi 5	Gelora Bung Karno Aquatic Stadium, Jakarta; Referees: Tan (SGP), Han (KOR)

29 August; 17:10	Hong Kong	8–11	Indonesia	Gelora Bung Karno Aquatic Stadium, Jakarta; Referees: Stavridis (GRE), Alexandrescu (ROU)
29 August; 17:10	Score by quarters: 0–3, 3–3, 2–3, 3–2			Gelora Bung Karno Aquatic Stadium, Jakarta; Referees: Stavridis (GRE), Alexandrescu (ROU)
29 August; 17:10	Fung K.Chu., Chan 3	Goals	Harahap 5	Gelora Bung Karno Aquatic Stadium, Jakarta; Referees: Stavridis (GRE), Alexandrescu (ROU)

=== Women's tournament ===
Team roster

Head coach: (China) Zhao Jinwen

1. Li Ho In (GK)
2. Chan Sze Ting (D)
3. So Ting Yuet (CF)
4. Cheng Ka Yan (D)
5. Ng Wai Yiu (CB)
6. Lau Kwan Ling (CF)
7. Lau Tsz Ching (D)
8. Yeung Sze Wai (CB) (C)
9. Mak Lee Sze (CF)
10. Lo Ka Man (D)
11. Zada Yeung (CB)
12. Gwen Leung (D)
13. Cindy Ho (GK)

Round robin

Pos	Team	Pld	W	D	L	GF	GA	GD	Pts
1	China	5	5	0	0	76	24	+52	10
2	Kazakhstan	5	4	0	1	70	34	+36	8
3	Japan	5	3	0	2	84	36	+48	6
4	Thailand	5	2	0	3	53	62	−9	4
5	Indonesia	5	1	0	4	30	82	−52	2
6	Hong Kong	5	0	0	5	22	97	−75	0

Source: OCA

16 August; 15:50	Thailand	19–6	Hong Kong	Gelora Bung Karno Aquatic Stadium, Jakarta; Referees: Flahive (AUS), Ni (CHN)
16 August; 15:50	Score by quarters: 5–1, 3–3, 8–0, 3–2			Gelora Bung Karno Aquatic Stadium, Jakarta; Referees: Flahive (AUS), Ni (CHN)
16 August; 15:50	Saraikarn 5	Goals	Mak 3	Gelora Bung Karno Aquatic Stadium, Jakarta; Referees: Flahive (AUS), Ni (CHN)

17 August; 14:30	Indonesia	9–8	Hong Kong	Gelora Bung Karno Aquatic Stadium, Jakarta; Referees: Tahara (JPN), Salnichenko (KAZ)
17 August; 14:30	Score by quarters: 1–3, 1–2, 1–1, 6–2			Gelora Bung Karno Aquatic Stadium, Jakarta; Referees: Tahara (JPN), Salnichenko (KAZ)
17 August; 14:30	Savitri, Siwabessy, Legawa 2	Goals	Chan, Mak 4	Gelora Bung Karno Aquatic Stadium, Jakarta; Referees: Tahara (JPN), Salnichenko (KAZ)

19 August; 14:30	Hong Kong	2–22	Kazakhstan	Gelora Bung Karno Aquatic Stadium, Jakarta; Referees: Pranolo (INA), Tan (SGP)
19 August; 14:30	Score by quarters: 0–7, 1–3, 1–7, 0–5			Gelora Bung Karno Aquatic Stadium, Jakarta; Referees: Pranolo (INA), Tan (SGP)
19 August; 14:30	Chan, Leung 1	Goals	Novikova, Myrzabekova 4	Gelora Bung Karno Aquatic Stadium, Jakarta; Referees: Pranolo (INA), Tan (SGP)

20 August; 15:50	Japan	31–3	Hong Kong	Gelora Bung Karno Aquatic Stadium, Jakarta; Referees: Jiathornwattana (THA), Salnichenko (KAZ)
20 August; 15:50	Score by quarters: 8–2, 5–0, 12–0, 6–1			Gelora Bung Karno Aquatic Stadium, Jakarta; Referees: Jiathornwattana (THA), Salnichenko (KAZ)
20 August; 15:50	Arima 7	Goals	Chan, Ng, Yeung S. 1	Gelora Bung Karno Aquatic Stadium, Jakarta; Referees: Jiathornwattana (THA), Salnichenko (KAZ)

21 August; 15:50	Hong Kong	3–16	China	Gelora Bung Karno Aquatic Stadium, Jakarta; Referees: Tahara (JPN), Han (KOR)
21 August; 15:50	Score by quarters: 1–4, 0–4, 0–4, 2–4			Gelora Bung Karno Aquatic Stadium, Jakarta; Referees: Tahara (JPN), Han (KOR)
21 August; 15:50	Chan, Ng, Lau K. 1	Goals	Xiong 4	Gelora Bung Karno Aquatic Stadium, Jakarta; Referees: Tahara (JPN), Han (KOR)

== Wushu ==
Taolu

Athlete	Event	Event 1		Event 2		Total	Rank
Athlete	Event	Result	Rank	Result	Rank	Total	Rank
Leung Cheuk Hei	Men's nanquan and nangun	9.56	10	9.68	9	19.24	8
Samuel Hui Tak Yan	Men's taijiquan and taijijian	9.70	2	9.69	5	19.39	4
Lau Tsz Hong	Men's daoshu and gunshu	9.68	6	9.68	6	19.36	6
Geng Xiaoling	Women's changquan	9.62	5	—N/a		9.62	5
Yuen Ka Ying	Women's nanquan and nandao	9.59	5	9.68	3	19.27	3rd place, bronze medalist(s)
Juanita Mok Uen-Ying	Women's taijiquan and taijijian	9.71	2	9.71	2	19.42	2nd place, silver medalist(s)
Lydia Sham Hui Yu	Women's jianshu and qiangshu	9.67	4	9.40	6	19.07	6

Sanda

Athlete	Event	Round of 32	Round of 16	Quarterfinal	Semifinal	Final	
Athlete	Event	Opposition Score	Opposition Score	Opposition Score	Opposition Score	Opposition Score	Rank
Lam Man Kan	Men's –56 kg	Bye	A Amanbekov (KGZ); L 1–2	did not advance			
