= Leung Chun Shek =

Hong Kong rower (born 1986)

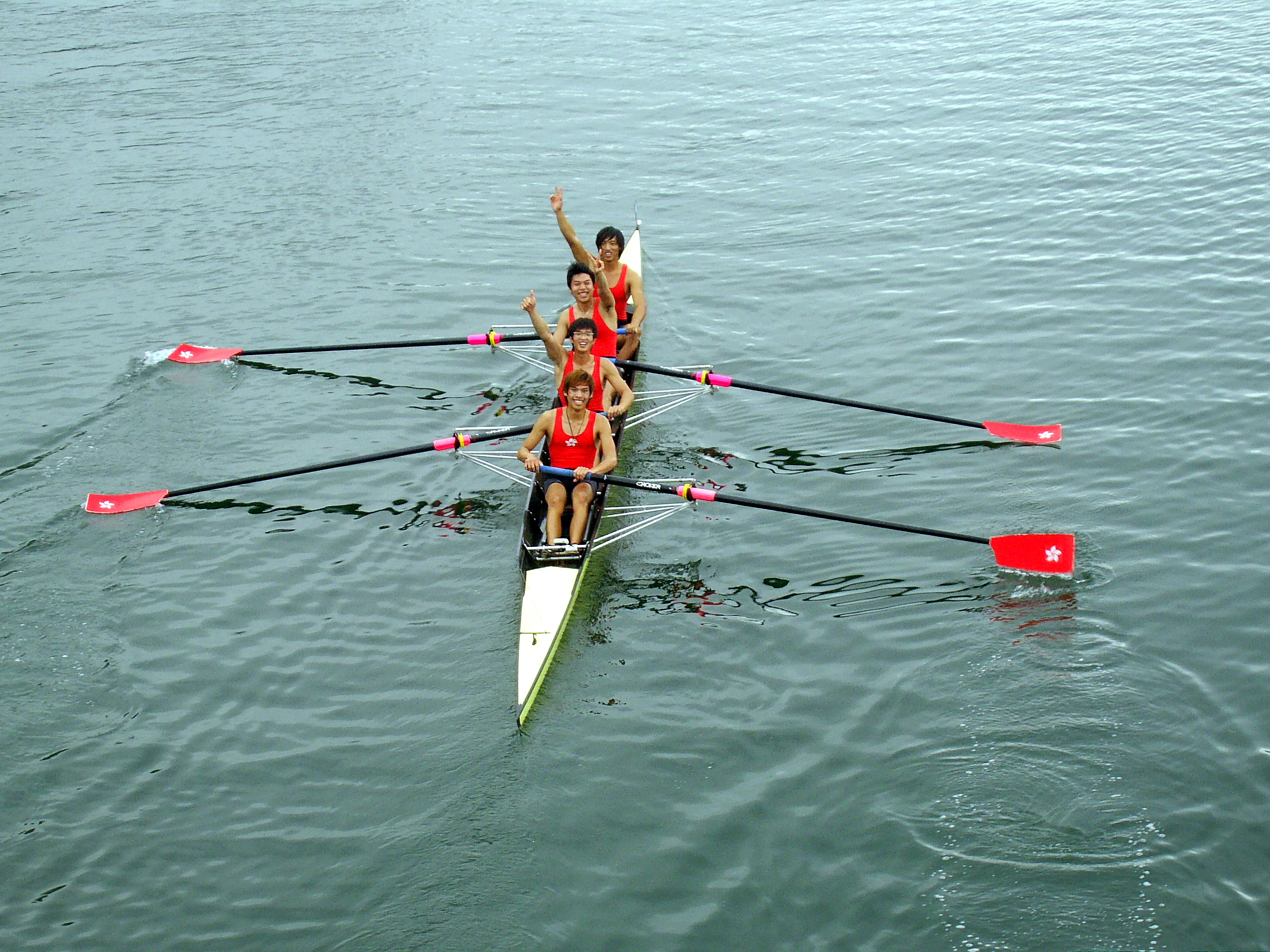

Personal information
- Nationality: Hong Konger
- Born: 26 April 1986 (age 39); Hong Kong

Sport
- Sport: Rowing

Leung Chun Shek (born 26 April 1986) is a Hong Kong rower. He competed in the men's lightweight double sculls event at the 2012 Summer Olympics.
