= Pencak silat at the 2018 Asian Games =

2018 Asian Games competition

- Venue: Padepokan Pencak Silat
- Dates: 23–29 August 2018
- Competitors: 166 from 16 nations

The Pencak silat competition at the 2018 Asian Games was held in Jakarta, Indonesia from 23 to 29 August 2018 at Pencak Silat Arena (Padepokan) inside the Taman Mini Indonesia Indah in East Jakarta. This sport is popular in Southeast Asia. Hosts Indonesia won 14 out of the 16 gold medals, and Vietnam won the remaining two.

== Schedule ==
P	Preliminary	R	Round of 16	¼	Quarterfinals	½	Semifinals	F	Final

Event↓/Date →	23rd Thu	24th Fri	25th Sat	26th Sun	27th Mon	28th Tue	29th Wed
Men's tunggal			P				F
Men's ganda					F		
Men's regu					F		
Men's tanding 55 kg	R	¼		½	F		
Men's tanding 60 kg	R		¼	½			F
Men's tanding 65 kg	R	¼		½	F		
Men's tanding 70 kg	R	¼		½	F		
Men's tanding 75 kg	R	¼		½			F
Men's tanding 90 kg	¼			½	F		
Men's tanding 95 kg	R		¼	½			F
Women's tunggal			P		F		
Women's ganda							F
Women's regu							F
Women's tanding 55 kg	R	¼		½			F
Women's tanding 60 kg	R	¼	¼	½	F		
Women's tanding 65 kg	¼	¼		½			F

== Medalists ==
=== Men's seni ===
Event	Gold	Silver	Bronze
Tunggal	Sugianto; Indonesia	Ilyas Sadara; Thailand	Al-Mohaidib Abad; Philippines
Ganda	Indonesia; Yolla Primadona Jampil; Hendy	Vietnam; Trần Đức Danh; Lê Hồng Quân	Malaysia; Taqiyuddin Hamid; Afifi Nordin
Regu	Indonesia; Nunu Nugraha; Asep Yuldan Sani; Anggi Faisal Mubarok	Vietnam; Vũ Tiến Dũng; Nguyễn Xuân Thành; Lưu Văn Nam	Thailand; Fadil Dama; Masofee Wani; Islamee Wani

=== Men's tanding ===
Event	Gold	Silver	Bronze
Class B (50–55 kg)	Abdul Malik; Indonesia	Faizul Nasir; Malaysia	Dines Dumaan; Philippines
Class B (50–55 kg)	Abdul Malik; Indonesia	Faizul Nasir; Malaysia	Bo Thammavongsa; Laos
Class C (55–60 kg)	Hanifan Yudani Kusumah; Indonesia	Nguyễn Thái Linh; Vietnam	Adilan Chemaeng; Thailand
Class C (55–60 kg)	Hanifan Yudani Kusumah; Indonesia	Nguyễn Thái Linh; Vietnam	Hazim Amzad; Malaysia
Class D (60–65 kg)	Iqbal Candra Pratama; Indonesia	Nguyễn Ngọc Toàn; Vietnam	Jeff Loon; Philippines
Class D (60–65 kg)	Iqbal Candra Pratama; Indonesia	Nguyễn Ngọc Toàn; Vietnam	Abdumalik Salimov; Uzbekistan
Class E (65–70 kg)	Komang Harik Adi Putra; Indonesia	Al-Jufferi Jamari; Malaysia	Phạm Tuấn Anh; Vietnam
Class E (65–70 kg)	Komang Harik Adi Putra; Indonesia	Al-Jufferi Jamari; Malaysia	Zholdoshbek Akimkanov; Kyrgyzstan
Class F (70–75 kg)	Trần Đình Nam; Vietnam	Fauzi Khalid; Malaysia	Daniiar Tokurov; Kyrgyzstan
Class F (70–75 kg)	Trần Đình Nam; Vietnam	Fauzi Khalid; Malaysia	Amri Rusdana; Indonesia
Class I (85–90 kg)	Aji Bangkit Pamungkas; Indonesia	Sheik Ferdous Alau'ddin; Singapore	Nguyễn Duy Tuyến; Vietnam
Class I (85–90 kg)	Aji Bangkit Pamungkas; Indonesia	Sheik Ferdous Alau'ddin; Singapore	Robial Sobri; Malaysia
Class J (90–95 kg)	Nguyễn Văn Trí; Vietnam	Khaizul Yaacob; Malaysia	Sheik Farhan Alau'ddin; Singapore
Class J (90–95 kg)	Nguyễn Văn Trí; Vietnam	Khaizul Yaacob; Malaysia	Tachin Pokjay; Thailand

=== Women's seni ===
Event	Gold	Silver	Bronze
Tunggal	Puspa Arumsari; Indonesia	Nurzuhairah Yazid; Singapore	Cherry May Regalado; Philippines
Ganda	Indonesia; Ayu Sidan Wilantari; Ni Made Dwiyanti	Thailand; Saowanee Chanthamunee; Oraya Choosuwan	Malaysia; Nor Hamizah Abu Hassan; Nur Syazreen Abdul Malik
Regu	Indonesia; Pramudita Yuristya; Lutfi Nurhasanah; Gina Tri Lestari	Vietnam; Nguyễn Thị Thu Hà; Nguyễn Thị Huyền; Vương Thị Bình	Thailand; Asma Jehma; Yuweeta Samahoh; Ruhana Chearbuli

=== Women's tanding ===
Event	Gold	Silver	Bronze
Class B (50–55 kg)	Wewey Wita; Indonesia	Trần Thị Thêm; Vietnam	Nurul Shafiqah Saiful; Singapore
Class B (50–55 kg)	Wewey Wita; Indonesia	Trần Thị Thêm; Vietnam	Olathay Sounthavong; Laos
Class C (55–60 kg)	Sarah Tria Monita; Indonesia	Nong Oy Vongphakdy; Laos	Siti Khadijah Shahrem; Singapore
Class C (55–60 kg)	Sarah Tria Monita; Indonesia	Nong Oy Vongphakdy; Laos	Hoàng Thị Loan; Vietnam
Class D (60–65 kg)	Pipiet Kamelia; Indonesia	Nguyễn Thị Cẩm Nhi; Vietnam	Janejira Wankrue; Thailand
Class D (60–65 kg)	Pipiet Kamelia; Indonesia	Nguyễn Thị Cẩm Nhi; Vietnam	Tahmineh Karbalaei; Iran

== Medal table ==
Rank	Nation	Gold	Silver	Bronze	Total
1	Indonesia (INA)	14	0	1	15
2	Vietnam (VIE)	2	7	3	12
3	Malaysia (MAS)	0	4	4	8
4	Thailand (THA)	0	2	5	7
5	Singapore (SGP)	0	2	3	5
6	Laos (LAO)	0	1	2	3
7	Philippines (PHI)	0	0	4	4
8	Kyrgyzstan (KGZ)	0	0	2	2
9	Iran (IRI)	0	0	1	1
9	Uzbekistan (UZB)	0	0	1	1
Totals (10 entries)		16	16	26	58

== Participating nations ==
A total of 166 athletes from 16 nations competed in pencak silat at the 2018 Asian Games:

- Brunei (4)
- India (3)
- Indonesia (22)
- Iran (9)
- Japan (1)
- Kyrgyzstan (9)
- Laos (17)
- Malaysia (19)
- Nepal (1)
- Pakistan (5)
- Philippines (9)
- Singapore (17)
- Thailand (22)
- Timor-Leste (5)
- Uzbekistan (5)
- Vietnam (18)
