= List of Asian Games medalists in pencak silat =

This is the complete list of Asian Games medalists in pencak silat on 2018.

== Men ==
=== Seni ===
==== Tunggal ====
Games	Gold	Silver	Bronze
2018 Jakarta–Palembang	Sugianto (INA)	Ilyas Sadara (THA)	Al-Mohaidib Abad (PHI)

==== Ganda ====
Games	Gold	Silver	Bronze
2018 Jakarta–Palembang	Indonesia (INA); Yolla Primadona Jampil; Hendy	Vietnam (VIE); Trần Đức Danh; Lê Hồng Quân	Malaysia (MAS); Taqiyuddin Hamid; Afifi Nordin

==== Regu ====
Games	Gold	Silver	Bronze
2018 Jakarta–Palembang	Indonesia (INA); Nunu Nugraha; Asep Yuldan Sani; Anggi Faisal Mubarok	Vietnam (VIE); Vũ Tiến Dũng; Nguyễn Xuân Thành; Lưu Văn Nam	Thailand (THA); Fadil Dama; Masofee Wani; Islamee Wani

=== Tanding ===
==== 55 kg ====
Games	Gold	Silver	Bronze
2018 Jakarta–Palembang	Abdul Malik (INA)	Faizul Nasir (MAS)	Bo Thammavongsa (LAO)
2018 Jakarta–Palembang	Abdul Malik (INA)	Faizul Nasir (MAS)	Dines Dumaan (PHI)

==== 60 kg ====
Games	Gold	Silver	Bronze
2018 Jakarta–Palembang	Hanifan Yudani Kusumah (INA)	Nguyễn Thái Linh (VIE)	Hazim Amzad (MAS)
2018 Jakarta–Palembang	Hanifan Yudani Kusumah (INA)	Nguyễn Thái Linh (VIE)	Adilan Chemaeng (THA)

==== 65 kg ====
Games	Gold	Silver	Bronze
2018 Jakarta–Palembang	Iqbal Candra Pratama (INA)	Nguyễn Ngọc Toàn (VIE)	Jeff Loon (PHI)
2018 Jakarta–Palembang	Iqbal Candra Pratama (INA)	Nguyễn Ngọc Toàn (VIE)	Abdumalik Salimov (UZB)

==== 70 kg ====
Games	Gold	Silver	Bronze
2018 Jakarta–Palembang	Komang Harik Adi Putra (INA)	Al-Jufferi Jamari (MAS)	Zholdoshbek Akimkanov (KGZ)
2018 Jakarta–Palembang	Komang Harik Adi Putra (INA)	Al-Jufferi Jamari (MAS)	Phạm Tuấn Anh (VIE)

==== 75 kg ====
Games	Gold	Silver	Bronze
2018 Jakarta–Palembang	Trần Đình Nam (VIE)	Fauzi Khalid (MAS)	Amri Rusdana (INA)
2018 Jakarta–Palembang	Trần Đình Nam (VIE)	Fauzi Khalid (MAS)	Daniiar Tokurov (KGZ)

==== 90 kg ====
Games	Gold	Silver	Bronze
2018 Jakarta–Palembang	Aji Bangkit Pamungkas (INA)	Sheik Ferdous Alau'ddin (SGP)	Robial Sobri (MAS)
2018 Jakarta–Palembang	Aji Bangkit Pamungkas (INA)	Sheik Ferdous Alau'ddin (SGP)	Nguyễn Duy Tuyến (VIE)

==== 95 kg ====
Games	Gold	Silver	Bronze
2018 Jakarta–Palembang	Nguyễn Văn Trí (VIE)	Khaizul Yaacob (MAS)	Sheik Farhan Alau'ddin (SGP)
2018 Jakarta–Palembang	Nguyễn Văn Trí (VIE)	Khaizul Yaacob (MAS)	Tachin Pokjay (THA)

== Women ==
=== Seni ===
==== Tunggal ====
Games	Gold	Silver	Bronze
2018 Jakarta–Palembang	Puspa Arumsari (INA)	Nurzuhairah Yazid (SGP)	Cherry May Regalado (PHI)

==== Ganda ====
Games	Gold	Silver	Bronze
2018 Jakarta–Palembang	Indonesia (INA); Ayu Sidan Wilantari; Ni Made Dwiyanti	Thailand (THA); Saowanee Chanthamunee; Oraya Choosuwan	Malaysia (MAS); Nor Hamizah Abu Hassan; Nur Syazreen Abdul Malik

==== Regu ====
Games	Gold	Silver	Bronze
2018 Jakarta–Palembang	Indonesia (INA); Pramudita Yuristya; Lutfi Nurhasanah; Gina Tri Lestari	Vietnam (VIE); Nguyễn Thị Thu Hà; Nguyễn Thị Huyền; Vương Thị Bình	Thailand (THA); Asma Jehma; Yuweeta Samahoh; Ruhana Chearbuli

=== Tanding ===
==== 55 kg ====
Games	Gold	Silver	Bronze
2018 Jakarta–Palembang	Wewey Wita (INA)	Trần Thị Thêm (VIE)	Olathay Sounthavong (LAO)
2018 Jakarta–Palembang	Wewey Wita (INA)	Trần Thị Thêm (VIE)	Nurul Shafiqah Saiful (SGP)

==== 60 kg ====
Games	Gold	Silver	Bronze
2018 Jakarta–Palembang	Sarah Tria Monita (INA)	Nong Oy Vongphakdy (LAO)	Siti Khadijah Shahrem (SGP)
2018 Jakarta–Palembang	Sarah Tria Monita (INA)	Nong Oy Vongphakdy (LAO)	Hoàng Thị Loan (VIE)

==== 65 kg ====
Games	Gold	Silver	Bronze
2018 Jakarta–Palembang	Pipiet Kamelia (INA)	Nguyễn Thị Cẩm Nhi (VIE)	Tahmineh Karbalaei (IRI)
2018 Jakarta–Palembang	Pipiet Kamelia (INA)	Nguyễn Thị Cẩm Nhi (VIE)	Janejira Wankrue (THA)
