= Concerns and controversies at the 2018 Asian Games =

A number of concerns and controversies surfaced before and during the 2018 Asian Games in Jakarta and Palembang, Indonesia.

== Prior to the Games ==
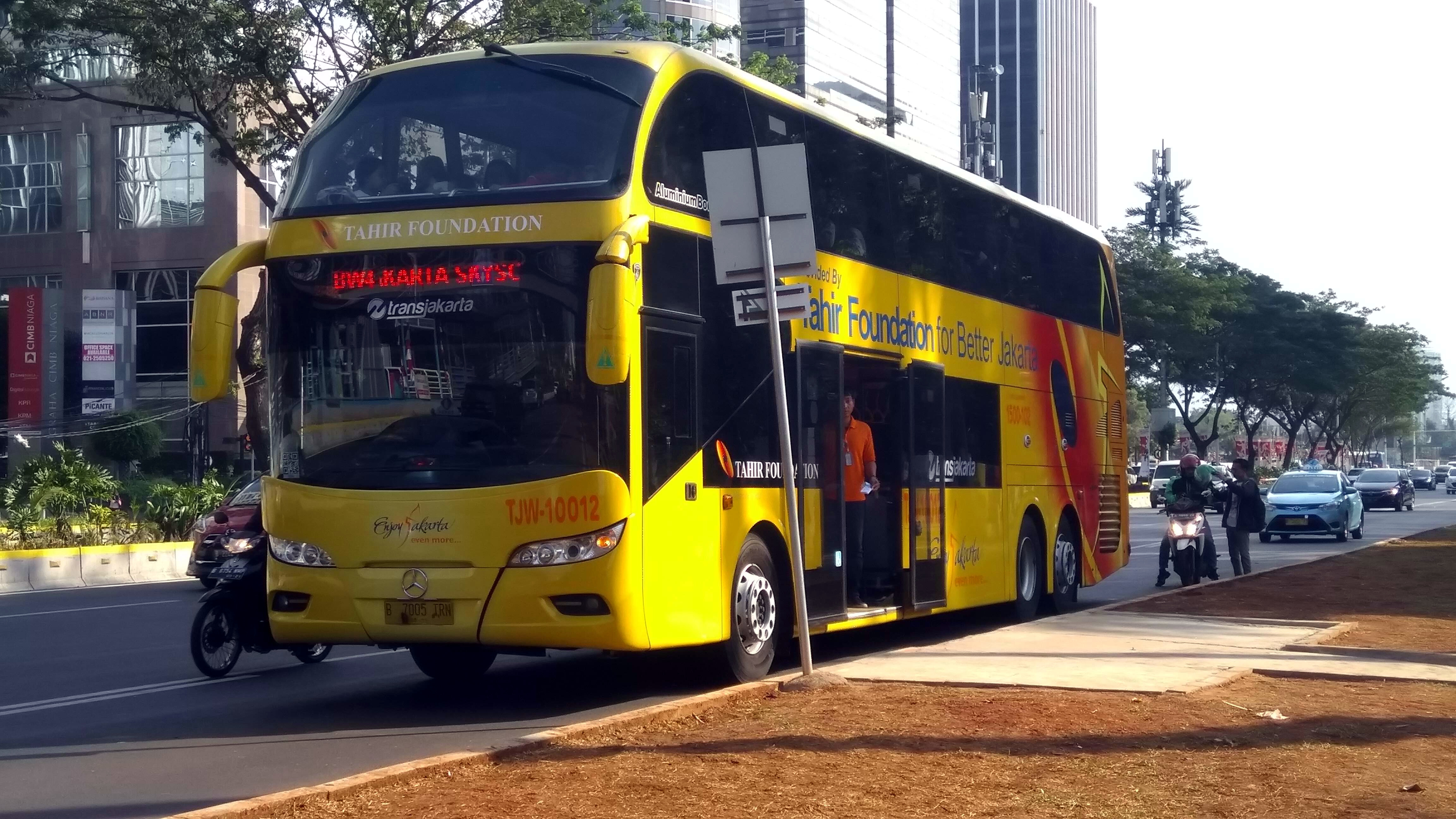
Numbers of bus shelters at Jenderal Sudirman road of Jakarta were separated from the main road by a green corridor made to grow plants and trees, as part of the road's sidewalk revitalization for the Asian Games. It disturbs the operational of feeder and double decker buses that stops at the affected stops.

Jakarta, consistently ranked as having one of the world's worst traffic congestion problems, was building a subway and two light metro systems; however, the subway and the first light metro would not be ready until 2019, and the second light metro construction faced numerous delays until 2023. Organizers had proposed closing schools during the event to curb traffic from millions of commuting pupils, this was never occurred. Authorities also proposed to set aside toll roads and bus lanes for special official and athlete use during the Games. Jakarta has also instated an odd-even licence plate system to limit congestion.

The sidewalk of the Jenderal Sudirman Road (Jalan Jenderal Sudirman), the main corridor of Jakarta, underwent a revitalization for the games and to support the operational of the new subway system. The work was overall uneven; some parts of the sidewalks were finished, while others were not. The epicenter of attention is the condition of bus stops at the front of the main venues of the games. The bus stops' shelter was separated from the roadside by a corridor of grass as a part of the new sidewalk design. But eventually, a ramp was built to connect between the old shelter and the road. New shelters were later built within the green corridor after the games concluded.

Air pollution also became a concern in both cities. Jakarta has long struggled to boost air quality, regularly rated as unsafe by the World Health Organization (WHO) as Jakarta's average score on the Air Quality Index (AQI) had exceeded 100 during early July 2018, once reaching the "unhealthy" range at 171 on 11 AM, Tuesday, 17 July 2018. Palembang also had been constantly under risk of haze caused by peatland fire during dry season which coincides with the Games. Authorities are looking into the possibility of cloud seeding to combat the fire hotspots by triggering rainfall in dry areas with flares of salt shot into suitable clouds. Authorities covered a polluted, foul-smelling river near the Asian Games athletes' village in Jakarta with black nylon mesh over fears it will be an eyesore at the showpiece event.

Security is another concern, with the Games taking place just a few months after a series of terror attacks, which killed dozens of people and provoked fear over Islamist militants. Some 100,000 security staff including bomb squad and sniper teams would be deployed in Jakarta, Palembang, and West Java, where the majority of events are hosted. Local police said they have been taking part in a pre-Asian Games crackdown on terror suspects and petty street criminals.

The Olympic Council of Malaysia (OCM) also raised concerns over Malaysian men's U-16 national football team security issues due to the recent provocations by Indonesian fans at venues and on social media, it was initially triggered after Malaysia won at the 2018 AFF U-19 Youth Championship at East Java. When the penalty shoot-out ended with a score 3–2 against the host, dissatisfied Indonesian supporters to throw bottles and rocks at the Malaysian team after their team failed to qualify to the finals which caused the Malaysian team to run to their dressing room for safety.

On 21 July 2018, less than one month from the Games, women football venue of Gelora Sriwijaya Stadium in Palembang had been partially damaged in a riot during local football league. At least 335 seats had been destroyed by the mob.

Officials had held Asian Games' men football tournament drawing three times due to protest from UAE and Palestine which were incidentally not included in the first drawing. Later, Iraq withdrew from tournament which forced officials to rebalance the groups by determining which of Palestine or UAE would be moved to Group C to replace Iraq.

Prior to the start of the golf tournament of the Asian Games, several national golf associations complained to the Court of Arbitration for Sport that Sri Lanka, Bangladesh, Macau and Uzbekistan had possibly entered professional golfers, but the CAS ruled that none of the players were professional as the golf tournament was reserved only for the amateur players.

== During the Games ==
=== Alcohol ban ===
The Indonesian Asian Games Organizing Committee (INASGOC) banned athletes competing in the Games from consuming alcohol and outside food in their accommodation in the host cities of Jakarta and Palembang. On 28 August 2018, officials said they had confiscated many bottles and cans of beer that athletes and officials had tried to bring in from outside the athletes' villages.

=== Alleged gratification ===
Since the sales of closing ceremony ticket, Indonesian anti-corruption commission, KPK has alleged to receive 14 free tickets with 13 of them had not been used. The gratification allegations started when the state enterprises of Indonesia (BUMN) bought several tickets, KPK has warned some officials in BUMN to report back of the buying. Jusuf Kalla, Vice President of Indonesia, had declared that "it did not include in gratification because it is less than Rp 10 millions [threshold of official gratification in Indonesia]". Even more, KPK had not known whether it was included in gratifications or not.

=== Athletics ===
On 25 August 2018, Hiroto Inoue won the Asian Games men's marathon in a controversial sprint finish, with Bahrain later lodging a complaint to race officials, accusing the Japanese runner of barging second-place finisher Elhassan Elabbassi. Meanwhile, on the same day, a cat ran into the track of the Gelora Bung Karno Main Stadium during the interval of women's 100m qualification competition.

=== Basketball ===
Coach Yeng Guiao of the Philippine men's National Basketball team raised doubts as to why a Hong Kong referee officiated the match up between China and the Philippines. Despite having its own organized sports body, Hong Kong is a special administrative region of China. He questioned the number of China's free throw attempts to the Philippines', 39 foul shots to 15. The Chinese team was assessed to only 16 fouls compared to the Philippines, 25.

=== Boxing ===
In women's 57 kg, Filipino boxer Nesthy Petecio lost a controversial bout against Chinese rival Yin Junhua to the surprise of most of the crowd at the Jakarta International Expo Hall C. Japanese and Turkmen judges ruled in favor of the Filipino while Bulgarian and South Korean judges ruled in favor of the Chinese. The French judge scored a 28–28, but later handed the fight to the Chinese to break the deadlock. Petecio shed tears of anger and stared at the judges. Philippine chef de mission Richard Gomez said it's a case of “bad call, bad decision and bad scoring” while Association of Boxing Alliances in the Philippines (ABAP) executive director Ed Picson blasted the result of the bout and appeals to officials “that the judges responsible for this travesty not be assigned to officiate in the coming Philippines fights as judges or referees.”

=== Football ===
Luis Milla, the head coach of Indonesian men's national football team called the referee Shaun Evans from Australia 'unfit' after he gave two controversial penalties during a game between Indonesia and the United Arab Emirates. Milla was disappointed because the referee was biased during the whole game. "The referee doesn't have any competence to officiate at the Asian Games. He [Shaun Evans] is not on that level. He's the [opponent’s] 12th player and I am sad that our players' struggle had to end like this," the Spanish coach said. The Indonesian goalkeeper, Andritany Ardhiyasa, added at the press conference, "Today is a sad day for us because we were robbed by [the referee]. The second penalty should not have been awarded".

=== Organizational issues ===
During the medal ceremony of men's 200 metre freestyle swimming on 19 August 2018, the flags of the three medalists crashed to the ground due to a technical malfunction. Sun Yang, the Chinese swimmer and the gold medalist of the event, immediately got off the podium, walked to some officials and demanded the medal ceremony to be conducted once again. The flags were re-attached to the hoist but couldn't be raised, therefore the military flagbearers resorted to holding up the medalist flags at the same height as the hoist frames, and the Chinese anthem was played for a second time.

=== Pencak Silat ===
On 26 August 2018, in the Semifinal of Men's tanding 85 kg to 90 kg, Muhammad Robial Sobri, a Malaysian athlete, deliberately kicked his Singaporean opponent, Sheik Alauddin Sheik Ferdous, after the Singaporean had fallen to the ground.

On 27 August 2018, another Malaysian pencak silat athlete, Mohd Al-Jufferi Jamari accused the judges of bias. Even he was walked out off the final match, the furious three-time world champion left a damage in the changing room's partition at venue after the match, something for which the Malaysian delegation had apologized. Indonesia had won 14 out of 16 gold medals on offer, while several countries including Singapore and Iran had complain about the judging in this event, claiming that judges are favouring local athletes.

On the other hand, the Indonesian Asian Games Organizing Committee (INASGOC) chairman Erick Thohir, had rejected accusations of cheating, claiming that the game "is open, with people can see it on television and it is clear". Erick also insisted that they have "monitor closely all judges, who are chosen by the Asian governing body". He added that, "We see the domination of certain countries in sports such as judo, karate and taekwondo. The funny thing is when Indonesia achieves such success, why do people complain?".

=== Prostitution ===
Four Japanese basketball athletes were kicked out of the Games after buying sex in the notorious red light district in Jakarta. A case which the OCA President said it serve as the warning to other athletes.

== Doping ==
On August 24, Turkmenistani wrestler, Rustem Nazarov became the first athlete to fail a doping test. Nazarov had competed in the men's 57 kilograms freestyle event on August 19 and was beaten 12–8 in his first match by India's Sandeep Tomar.

On September 2, Mongolian reigning world champion Orkhon Purevdorj was stripped of the gold medal she claimed in the women's 62 kilogram event. Purevdorj tested positive for anabolic steroid Stanazolol and received lengthy ban on sporting events.
