= Pencak silat at the 2018 Asian Games – Men's tanding 60 kg =

Men's tanding 60 kg at the 2018 Asian Games
- Venue: Padepokan Pencak Silat
- Dates: 23–29 August 2018
- Competitors: 9 from 9 nations

Medalists
gold medal	Hanifan Yudani Kusumah	Indonesia
silver medal	Nguyễn Thái Linh	Vietnam
bronze medal	Adilan Chemaeng	Thailand
bronze medal	Hazim Amzad	Malaysia

The men's tanding 60 kilograms competition at the 2018 Asian Games took place from 23 to 29 August 2018 at Padepokan Pencak Silat, Taman Mini Indonesia Indah, Jakarta, Indonesia.

Pencak silat is traditional Indonesian martial arts. Pencak silat is assessed from a punch, kick, sweep, and dings. The target that must be addressed is the patron in the body of every fighter who competed. Each judge gives an individual score for each competitor. The score given to each boxer would be taken from all 5 judges.

A total of nine competitors from nine countries competed in this Class C event, limited to fighters whose body weight was less than 60 kilograms.

Hanifan Yudani Kusumah from Indonesia won the gold medal after defeating Nguyễn Thái Linh from Vietnam in the gold medal match by the score of 3–2. Adilan Chemaeng from Thailand and Hazim Amzad from Malaysia finished third and won the bronze medal after losing in the semifinal.

== Schedule ==
All times are Western Indonesia Time (UTC+07:00)

Date	Time	Event
Thursday, 23 August 2018	15:30	Round of 16
Saturday, 25 August 2018	14:00	Quarterfinals
Sunday, 26 August 2018	16:00	Semifinals
Wednesday, 29 August 2018	16:00	Final

== Results ==
Round of 16
Ayubkhon Abdullaev (UZB)	0
Hamed Havasi (IRI)	5

Quarterfinals
Phoumiphon Vongphakdy (LAO)	0
Hanifan Yudani Kusumah (INA)	5
Adilan Chemaeng (THA)	5
Almaz Toichuev (KGZ)	0
Silvestre Barbosa (TLS)	0
Hazim Amzad (MAS)	5
Nguyễn Thái Linh (VIE)	5
Hamed Havasi (IRI)	0

Semifinals
Hanifan Yudani Kusumah (INA)	5
Adilan Chemaeng (THA)	0
Hazim Amzad (MAS)	0
Nguyễn Thái Linh (VIE)	5

Final
Hanifan Yudani Kusumah (INA)	3
Nguyễn Thái Linh (VIE)	2
