= Athletics at the 2018 Asian Games – Women's triple jump =

Women's triple jump at the 2018 Asian Games
- Venue: Gelora Bung Karno Stadium
- Date: 30 August 2018
- Competitors: 10 from 7 nations

Medalists
gold medal	Olga Rypakova	Kazakhstan
silver medal	Parinya Chuaimaroeng	Thailand
bronze medal	Vũ Thị Mến	Vietnam

The women's triple jump competition at the 2018 Asian Games was held on 30 August at the Gelora Bung Karno Stadium.

== Schedule ==
All times are Western Indonesia Time (UTC+07:00)

Date	Time	Event
Thursday, 30 August 2018	18:30	Final

== Records ==
Prior to this competition, the existing world, Asian and Games records were as follows.

World Record	Inessa Kravets (UKR)	15.50	Gothenburg, Sweden	10 August 1995
Asian Record	Olga Rypakova (KAZ)	15.25	Split, Croatia	4 September 2010
Games Record	Olga Rypakova (KAZ)	14.78	Guangzhou, China	25 November 2010

== Results ==
Legend

- DNS — Did not start

Rank	Athlete	Attempt						Result	Notes
Rank	Athlete	1	2	3	4	5	6	Result	Notes
1st place, gold medalist(s)	Olga Rypakova (KAZ)	X 0.0	14.00; 0.0	X −0.1	X 0.0	14.26; 0.0	14.01; 0.0	14.26	
2nd place, silver medalist(s)	Parinya Chuaimaroeng (THA)	13.89 −0.1	13.93 +0.3	11.17 −0.4	X 0.0	13.77; 0.0	13.91 +0.2	13.93	
3rd place, bronze medalist(s)	Vũ Thị Mến (VIE)	13.70 −0.1	X 0.0	12.72; 0.0	13.93; 0.0	X 0.0	13.79 +0.2	13.93	
4	Chen Ting (CHN)	X +0.3	13.69; 0.0	X +0.2	13.17; 0.0	13.49 +0.2	X −0.1	13.69	
5	Wang Wupin (CHN)	13.53; 0.0	13.58; 0.0	X −0.2	X 0.0	13.56; 0.0	X 0.0	13.58	
6	Irina Ektova (KAZ)	13.55; 0.0	13.58; 0.0	X +0.1	X −0.3	13.44 −0.2	12.24 −0.2	13.58	
7	Bae Chan-mi (KOR)	X +0.3	12.68; 0.0	X +0.2	X 0.0	X +0.3	X 0.0	12.68	
8	Maesaroh (INA)	11.93 −0.1	11.64 −0.1	X +0.4	11.26 −0.2	11.40; 0.0	11.96; 0.0	11.96	
—	Bùi Thị Thu Thảo (VIE)							DNS	
—	Maria Maratab (PAK)							DNS	
