= Brunei at the 2018 Asian Games =

- IOC code: BRU
- NOC: Brunei Darussalam National Olympic Council
- Website: www.bruneiolympic.org (in English)

in Jakarta and Palembang
- Competitors: 15 in 7 sports
- Flag bearer: Basma Lachkar
- Officials: 16
- Medals: Gold 0 Silver 0 Bronze 0 Total 0

Asian Games appearances (overview)
- 1990; 1994; 1998; 2002; 2006; 2010; 2014; 2018; 2022; 2026

Brunei Darussalam participated in the 2018 Asian Games in Jakarta and Palembang, Indonesia from 18 August to 2 September 2018. The contingent comprises 15 athletes and 16 officials led by Umi Kalthum binti Haji Abdul Karim as the Chef de Mission. Brunei wushu star Basma Lachkar was given the honor to be the country’s flag-bearer at the opening ceremony.

== Competitors ==
The following is a list of the number of competitors representing Brunei Darussalam that will participate at the Games:

Sport	Men	Women	Total
Athletics	2	0	2
Equestrian	1	0	1
Golf	2	0	2
Karate	0	1	1
Pencak silat	0	4	4
Weightlifting	1	0	1
Wushu	2	2	4
Total	8	7	15

== Equestrian ==
Jumping

Athlete	Horse	Event	Qualification		Qualifier 1			Qualifier 2 Team Final			Final round A			Final round B		
Athlete	Horse	Event	Points	Rank	Penalties	Total	Rank	Penalties	Total	Rank	Penalties	Total	Rank	Penalties	Total	Rank
Mohd Nasir Pg	Ivory de Roulard	Individual	19.08	59	29	48.08	58	did not advance								

== Golf ==
Brunei participated in golf competition at the Games.

Men

Athlete	Event	Round 1	Round 2	Round 3	Round 4	Total		
Athlete	Event	Score	Score	Score	Score	Score	Par	Rank
Mohd Aritz Maldini bin Haji Abdul Majid	Individual	78	84	79	78	319	+31	65
Awangku Muhd Syakir bin Pengiran Haji Alli	Individual	78	81	78	76	313	+25	57

== Karate ==
Brunei represented by the 2017 SEA Games bronze medalist, Wahidah Kamarul Zaman, who participated in the women's kata event.

== Pencak silat ==
Seni

Athlete	Event	Preliminary		Final	
Athlete	Event	Result	Rank	Result	Rank
Norleyermah Hj Raya	Women's tunggal	437	4	did not advance	
Anisah Najihah Abdullah; Qistina Athirah Zainal; Nur Azimatunnaemah Simat	Women's regu	—		447	5

== Weightlifting ==
Brunei entered the weightlifting competition at the Games with one athlete. Ak Yusri Amir Pg Dato Setia Yusof finished in the 11th position after lifts a total 188 kg.

Men

Athlete	Event	Snatch		Clean & Jerk		Total	Rank
Athlete	Event	Result	Rank	Result	Rank	Total	Rank
Ak Yusri Amir Pg Dato Setia Yusof	−85 kg	85	11	103	11	188	11

== Wushu ==
Taolu

Athlete	Event	Event 1		Event 2		Total	Rank
Athlete	Event	Result	Rank	Result	Rank	Total	Rank
Mohammad Adi Salihin	Men's nanquan and nangun	9.55	11	9.58	13	19.13	12
Md Sufi Shayiran Roslan	Men's nanquan and nangun	9.14	16	9.58	13	18.72	16
Guat Lian Ang	Women's taijiquan and taijijian	9.66	6	9.51	11	19.17	8
Basma Lachkar	Women's taijiquan and taijijian	9.68	3	9.08	13	18.76	13

== See also ==
- Brunei at the 2018 Asian Para Games
