= Vietnam at the 2018 Asian Games =

- Flag of Vietnam
- IOC code: VIE
- NOC: Vietnam Olympic Committee

in Jakarta and Palembang August 18 – September 2
- Competitors: 352 in 33 sports
- Flag bearer: Vũ Thành An
- Medals Ranked 16th: Gold 5 Silver 15 Bronze 19 Total 39

Asian Games appearances (overview)
- 1954; 1958; 1962; 1966; 1970; 1974; 1978; 1982; 1986; 1990; 1994; 1998; 2002; 2006; 2010; 2014; 2018; 2022; 2026

Vietnam competed at the 2018 Asian Games in Jakarta and Palembang, Indonesia from 18 August to 2 September 2018. The country surpassed its target of winning 3 gold medals at the Games by concluding the competition with 5 gold medals, 15 silver medals, and 19 bronze medals, ranking 16th out of 46 participating members of the Olympic Council of Asia.

== Medalists ==
The following Vietnam competitors won medals at the Games.

Medal	Name	Sport	Event	Date
Gold	Hồ Thị Lý; Lường Thị Thảo; Phạm Thị Thảo; Tạ Thanh Huyền	Rowing	Women's lightweight quadruple sculls	23 Aug
Gold	Quách Thị Lan	Athletics	Women's 400 metres hurdles	27 Aug
Gold	Bùi Thị Thu Thảo	Athletics	Women's long jump	27 Aug
Gold	Trần Đình Nam	Pencak silat	Men's tanding 75 kg	29 Aug
Gold	Nguyễn Văn Trí	Pencak silat	Men's tanding 95 kg	29 Aug
Silver	Nguyễn Huy Hoàng	Swimming	Men's 1500 metre freestyle	24 Aug
Silver	Thạch Kim Tuấn	Weightlifting	Men's 56 kg	20 Aug
Silver	Phạm Quốc Khánh	Wushu	Men's nanquan and nangun	21 Aug
Silver	Trịnh Văn Vinh	Weightlifting	Men's 62 kg	21 Aug
Silver	Bùi Trường Giang	Wushu	Men's sanda 56 kg	22 Aug
Silver	Đinh Thị Hảo; Trần Thị An; Lê Thị Hiền; Phạm Thị Huệ	Rowing	Women's coxless four	24 Aug
Silver	Nguyễn Minh Phụng	Karate	Men's +84 kg	25 Aug
Silver	Trần Đức Danh; Lê Hồng Quân	Pencak silat	Men's ganda	27 Aug
Silver	Vũ Tiến Dũng; Nguyễn Xuân Thành; Lưu Văn Nam	Pencak silat	Men's regu	27 Aug
Silver	Nguyễn Ngọc Toàn	Pencak silat	Men's tanding 65 kg	27 Aug
Silver	Nguyễn Thị Thu Hà; Nguyễn Thị Huyền; Vương Thị Bình	Pencak silat	Women's regu	29 Aug
Silver	Nguyễn Thị Cẩm Nhi	Pencak silat	Women's tanding 65 kg	29 Aug
Silver	Nguyễn Thái linh	Pencak silat	Men's tanding 60 kg	29 Aug
Silver	Trần Thị Thêm	Pencak silat	Women's tanding 55 kg	29 Aug
Silver	Nguyễn Thị Quyên; Giáp Thị Hiền; Dương Thị Xuyên; Nguyễn Thị Phương Trinh; Nguyễn Thị My; Hoàng Thị Hoa	Sepak takraw	Women's quadrant	1 Sep
Bronze	Lê Thị Linh Chi; Trần Quốc Cường	Shooting	Mixed 10 metre air pistol team	19 Aug
Bronze	Nguyễn Thiên Phụng; Lê Thanh Trung; Trần Tiến Khoa	Taekwondo	Men's team poomsae	19 Aug
Bronze	Nguyễn Huy Hoàng	Swimming	Men's 800 metre freestyle	20 Aug
Bronze	Nguyễn Thị Mỹ Hạnh	Wrestling	Women's freestyle 62 kg	20 Aug
Bronze	Dương Thúy Vi	Wushu	Women's jianshu and qiangshu	21 Aug
Bronze	Hoàng Thị Phương Giang	Wushu	Women's changquan	22 Aug
Bronze	Nguyễn Thị Quyên; Giáp Thị Hiền; Dương Thị Xuyên; Nguyễn Thị Phương Trinh; Nguyễn Thị My; Hoàng Thị Hoa; Bùi Thị Hải Yến; Phạm Thị Hằng; Đặng Thị Phượng Thanh; Đặng Thị Mỹ Linh; Nguyễn Thị Thu Hạnh; Trần Thị Thu Hoài	Sepak takraw	Women's team regu	22 Aug
Bronze	Nghiêm Văn Ý	Wushu	Men's sanda 60 kg	22 Aug
Bronze	Ngô Hữu Vượng	Shooting	Men's 10 metre running target	24 Aug
Bronze	Dương Thị Thanh Minh	Ju-jitsu	Women's 49 kg	24 Aug
Bronze	Phạm Tuấn Anh	Pencak silat	Men's tanding 70 kg	26 Aug
Bronze	Nguyễn Duy Tuyến	Pencak silat	Men's tanding 90 kg	26 Aug
Bronze	Hoàng Thị Loan	Pencak silat	Women's tanding 60 kg	26 Aug
Bronze	Nguyễn Thị Oanh	Athletics	Women's 3000 metres steeplechase	27 Aug
Bronze	Nguyễn Thị Lan	Kurash	Women's 78 kg	30 Aug
Bronze	Vũ Thị Mến	Athletics	Women's triple jump	30 Aug
Bronze	Nguyễn Thị Oanh; Quách Thị Lan; Hoàng Thị Ngọc; Nguyễn Thị Hằng	Athletics	Women's 4 × 400 metres relay	30 Aug
Bronze	Nguyễn Thị Tâm	Boxing	Women's 51 kg	31 Aug
Bronze	Đỗ Mạnh Tuấn; Lê Văn Nghĩa; Nguyễn Hoàng Lân; Nguyễn Hữu Danh; Đậu Văn Hoàng; Nguyễn Quốc Anh	Sepak takraw	Men's quadrant	31 Aug

Medals by sport
Sport	1st place, gold medalist(s)	2nd place, silver medalist(s)	3rd place, bronze medalist(s)	Total
Athletics	2	0	3	5
Boxing	0	0	1	1
Ju-jitsu	0	0	1	1
Karate	0	1	0	1
Kurash	0	0	1	1
Pencak silat	2	7	3	12
Rowing	1	1	0	2
Sepak takraw	0	1	2	3
Shooting	0	0	2	2
Swimming	0	1	1	2
Taekwondo	0	0	1	1
Weightlifting	0	2	0	2
Wrestling	0	0	1	1
Wushu	0	2	3	5
Total	5	15	19	39

Medals by day
Day	Date	1st place, gold medalist(s)	2nd place, silver medalist(s)	3rd place, bronze medalist(s)	Total
1	August 19	0	0	2	2
2	August 20	0	1	2	3
3	August 21	0	2	1	3
4	August 22	0	1	3	4
5	August 23	1	0	0	1
6	August 24	0	2	2	4
7	August 25	0	1	0	1
8	August 26	0	0	3	3
9	August 27	2	3	1	6
10	August 28	0	0	0	0
11	August 29	2	4	0	6
12	August 30	0	0	3	3
13	August 31	0	0	2	2
14	September 1	0	1	0	1
15	September 2	0	0	0	0
Total		5	15	19	39

== Competitors ==
The following is a list of the number of competitors representing Vietnam that participated at the Games:

Sport	Men	Women	Total
Archery	6	6	12
Athletics	6	16	22
Badminton	3	3	6
Basketball	4	4	8
Bowling	2	0	2
Boxing	3	3	6
Canoeing	0	2	2
Cycling	4	3	7
Fencing	10	6	16
Football	20	20	40
Golf	4	2	6
Gymnastics	5	4	9
Ju-jitsu	1	3	4
Judo	2	5	7
Karate	4	4	8
Kurash	4	5	9
Pencak silat	12	6	18
Rowing	12	10	22
Sambo	0	1	1
Sepak takraw	6	12	18
Shooting	10	6	16
Soft tennis	3	1	4
Swimming	6	4	10
Table tennis	5	5	10
Taekwondo	5	8	13
Tennis	4	2	6
Volleyball	16	16	32
Weightlifting	4	2	6
Wrestling	4	5	9
Wushu	6	6	12
Total	171	170	341

== Archery ==
Recurve

Athlete	Event	Ranking round		Round of 64	Round of 32	Round of 16	Quarterfinals	Semifinals	Final / BM	
Athlete	Event	Score	Seed	Opposition Score	Opposition Score	Opposition Score	Opposition Score	Opposition Score	Opposition Score	Rank
Chu Đức Anh	Men's individual	655	16	Bye	Hoàng (VIE); W 7–3	Lee (KOR); L 1–7	Did not advance			
Hoàng Văn Lộc	Men's individual	650	17	Bye	Chu (VIE); L 3–7	Did not advance				
Nguyễn Văn Duy	Men's individual	650	26	Did not advance						
Chu Đức Anh; Hoàng Văn Lộc; Nguyễn Văn Duy	Men's team	1955	9	Bye	India; L 3–5	Did not advance				
Lê Thị Thu Hiền	Women's individual	599	47	Did not advance						
Lộc Thị Đào	Women's individual	658	8	Bye	Sharbekova (KGZ); W 6–4	Cao (CHN); L 4–6	Did not advance			
Nguyễn Thị Phương	Women's individual	645	15	Bye	Saidiyeva (KAZ); W 6–2	Chang (KOR); L 4–6	Did not advance			
Lê Thị Thu Hiền; Lộc Thị Đào; Nguyễn Thị Phương	Women's team	1902	9	—N/a		North Korea; L 3–5	Did not advance			
Chu Đức Anh; Lộc Thị Đào	Mixed team	1313	6	—N/a	Bye	Malaysia; W 6–2	China; L 0–6	Did not advance		

Compound

Athlete	Event	Ranking round		Round of 32	Round of 16	Quarterfinals	Semifinals	Final / BM	
Athlete	Event	Score	Seed	Opposition Score	Opposition Score	Opposition Score	Opposition Score	Opposition Score	Rank
Mai Xuân Đức; Nguyễn Tiến Cường; Nguyễn Tuấn Thành	Men's team	2040	10	—N/a	Philippines; L 218–227	Did not advance			
Châu Kiều Oanh; Lê Phương Thảo; Nguyễn Thị Nhật Lệ	Women's team	2030	8	—N/a	Thailand; L 210–222	Did not advance			
Nguyễn Tiến Cường; Châu Kiều Oanh	Mixed team	1365	11	Bye	Kazakhstan; L 151–155	Did not advance			

== Athletics ==
Twenty-two Vietnamese athletes competed in athletics events at the 2018 Asian Games, winning a total of 5 medals including 1 gold medal in women's long jump, 1 silver medal in women's 400m hurdles, and 3 bronze medals in women's 3000m steeplechase, women's triple jump and women's 4 × 400 m relay.

Key

- N/A = Round not applicable for the event

Men's events

Athlete	Event	Qualification		Semifinal		Final	
Athlete	Event	Mark	Rank	Mark	Rank	Mark	Rank
Trần Đình Sơn	400m	48.97 Q	19	46.96	12	Did not advance	
Dương Văn Thái	800m	1:49.79	12	—N/a		Did not advance	
Dương Văn Thái	1500m	3:54.50	17	—N/a		Did not advance	
Nguyễn Văn Lai	5000m	—N/a				14:56.09	7
Phan Khắc Hoàng	400m hurdles	—N/a		53.47	18	Did not advance	
Quách Công Lịch	400m hurdles	—N/a		DNF		Did not advance	
Bùi Văn Đông	Long jump	7.48	14	—N/a		Did not advance	

Women's events

Athlete	Event	Qualification		Semifinal		Final	
Athlete	Event	Mark	Rank	Mark	Rank	Mark	Rank
Lê Tú Chinh	100m	11.74 q	11	11.76	12	Did not advance	
Lê Tú Chinh	200m	24.09 q, SB	12	24.13	11	Did not advance	
Lê Thị Mộng Tuyền	100m	11.98	19	Did not advance			
Quách Thị Lan	200m	23.72 Q	8	23.76 q	8	23.77	8
Quách Thị Lan	400m hurdles	55.74 Q, PB	2	—N/a		55.30 PB	1st place, gold medalist(s)
Nguyễn Thị Hằng	400m	54.99 q	8	—N/a		54.30 PB	8
Vũ Thị Ly	800m	2:10.50 Q	11	—N/a		2:12.41	8
Nguyễn Thị Oanh	1500m	—N/a				4:15.49 PB	4
Nguyễn Thị Oanh	3000m steeplechase	—N/a				9:43.83 SB	3rd place, bronze medalist(s)
Trần Thị Yến Hoa	100m hurdles	14.10	10	Did not advance			
Dương Thị Việt Anh	High jump	—N/a				1.80	6
Bùi Thị Thu Thảo	Long jump	—N/a				6.55 SB	1st place, gold medalist(s)
Bùi Thị Thu Thảo	Triple jump	—N/a				DNS	
Nguyễn Thị Trúc Mai	Long jump	—N/a				6.19	8
Vũ Thị Mến	Triple jump	—N/a				13.93 SB	3rd place, bronze medalist(s)
Lưu Kim Phụng; Lê Thị Mộng Tuyền; Hà Thị Thu; Lê Tú Chinh	4 × 100m relay	45.22 q	7	—N/a		45.42	7
Nguyễn Thị Oanh; Quách Thị Lan; Hoàng Thị Ngọc; Nguyễn Thị Hằng	4 × 400m relay	—N/a				3:33.23 SB	3rd place, bronze medalist(s)

Mixed events

Athlete	Event	Final	
Athlete	Event	Mark	Rank
Nguyễn Thị Hằng; Phan Khắc Hoàng; Cấn Thị Thủy; Trần Đình Sơn	4 × 400m relay	3:23.59	6

== Badminton ==
Key

- Bye = Athlete not required to compete in round
- N/A = Round not applicable for the event

Athlete	Event	Round of 64	Round of 32	Round of 16	Quarterfinals	Semifinals	Final	Rank
Athlete	Event	Opposition Score	Opposition Score	Opposition Score	Opposition Score	Opposition Score	Opposition Score	Rank
Nguyễn Tiến Minh	Men's singles	Bye	Wang T-w (TPE); L (22–24, 17–21)	Did not advance				-
Phạm Cao Cường	Men's singles	Bye	Chou T-c (TPE); L (16–21, 12–21)	Did not advance				-
Vũ Thị Trang	Women's singles	—N/a	P. V. Sindhu (IND); L (10–21, 21–12, 21–23)	Did not advance				-
Nguyễn Thùy Linh	Women's singles	—N/a	He BJ (CHN); L (14–21, 5–21)	Did not advance				-
Đỗ Tuấn Đức; Phạm Như Thảo	Mixed doubles	—N/a	S Dias / T P Hendahewa (SRI); W (13–21, 21–12), 21–13)	T Hoki / K Yonemoto (JPN); L (12–21, 13–21)	Did not advance			-

== Basketball 3 x 3 ==
=== Men ===
Roster

Vietnam men's national 3x3 team – 2018 roster
Players
Coaches

Pos.	No.	Name	Age – Date of birth	Height	Club	Ctr.
	6	Nguyễn Quang Huy	17 – October 6, 2000	1.90 m (6 ft 3 in)		(Vietnam)
	7	Huỳnh Vinh Quang	19 – January 11, 1999	1.77 m (5 ft 10 in)		(Vietnam)
	9	Triệu Hùng Minh	21 – October 9, 1996	1.78 m (5 ft 10 in)		(Vietnam)
	10	Nguyễn Lâm Anh Duy	20 – March 24, 1998	1.90 m (6 ft 3 in)		(Vietnam)

Head coach

- (Vietnam) Quách Tuấn Cường

Legend

- (C) Team captain
- Club – describes last
  club before the tournament
- Age – describes age
  on 21 August 2018

Pool A

Pos	Team	Pld	W	L	PF	PA	PD	Qualification
1	China	4	4	0	86	49	+37	Quarterfinals
2	Thailand	4	3	1	74	53	+21	Quarterfinals
3	Indonesia	4	2	2	67	59	+8	
4	Sri Lanka	4	1	3	57	66	−9	
5	Vietnam	4	0	4	28	85	−57	

Source: OCA

21 August
15:20

Vietnam	8–21	Indonesia
Pts: Nguyễn Q. 4		Pts: Kosasih 7

Gelora Bung Karno Tennis Center Court, Jakarta
Referees: Liu (MAS), Tan (SGP)

21 August
16:30

Vietnam	6–22	China
Pts: Nguyễn Q. 3		Pts: Xiao 12

Gelora Bung Karno Tennis Center Court, Jakarta
Referees: Liu (MAS), Tan (SGP)

24 August
17:10

Thailand	21–7	Vietnam
Pts: Korsah-dick 12		Pts: Triệu 3

Gelora Bung Karno Tennis Center Court, Jakarta
Referees: Lim (MAS), Liu (MAS)

24 August
17:50

Sri Lanka	21–7	Vietnam
Pts: Brent 20		Pts: Triệu 4

Gelora Bung Karno Tennis Center Court, Jakarta
Referees: Ibragimow (TKM), Al-Harthi (OMA)

=== Women ===
Pool A

Pos	Team	Pld	W	L	PF	PA	PD	Qualification
1	China	3	3	0	66	26	+40	Quarterfinals
2	Malaysia	3	2	1	45	41	+4	Quarterfinals
3	Vietnam	3	1	2	33	41	−8	
4	Qatar	3	0	3	16	52	−36	

Source: OCA

21 August
15:40

Vietnam	12–13	Malaysia
Pts: Trần 5		Pts: Wong, Ho 4

Gelora Bung Karno Tennis Center Court, Jakarta
Referees: Al-Harthi (OMA), Rulyov (KAZ)

21 August
17:50

China	22–9	Vietnam
Pts: Jiang 9		Pts: Nguyễn T.T. 5

Gelora Bung Karno Tennis Center Court, Jakarta
Referees: Lim (MAS), Ibragimow (TKM)

24 August
18:40

Qatar	6–12	Vietnam
Pts: Soliman 4		Pts: Trần 7

Gelora Bung Karno Tennis Center Court, Jakarta
Referees: Al-Harthi (OMA), Tan (SGP)

== Bowling ==
Men

Athlete(s)	Event	Block 1		Block 2		Total	Final rank
Athlete(s)	Event	Score	Rank	Score	Rank	Total	Final rank
Trần Anh Tuấn; Nguyễn Văn Hoàng	Trios	1067	33	N/A		2297	33
Trần Anh Tuấn; Nguyễn Văn Hoàng	Team of 6	1176	17	N/A		2376	16

== Boxing ==
Key

- Bye = Athlete not required to compete in round
- N/A = Round not applicable for the event

Men

Athlete	Event	Round of 32	Round of 16	Quarterfinals	Semifinals	Final	Rank
Athlete	Event	Opposition Result	Opposition Result	Opposition Result	Opposition Result	Opposition Result	Rank
Trần Văn Thảo	Flyweight (52 kg)	Hu J (CHN); L 0–5	Did not advance				-
Nguyễn Văn Chung	Light welterweight (64 kg)	Bye	Aal E K K (IRQ); L 0–5	Did not advance			-
Trần Đức Thọ	Welterweight (69 kg)	Waisuddin G (AFG); W WO	Eashash Z (JOR); L 0-5	Did not advance			-

Women

Athlete	Event	Round of 32	Round of 16	Quarterfinals	Semifinals	Final	Rank
Athlete	Event	Opposition Result	Opposition Result	Opposition Result	Opposition Result	Opposition Result	Rank
Nguyễn Thị Tâm	Flyweight (51 kg)	Bye	Nam E (KOR); W 5-0	Ochirbat J (MGL); W 5-0	Pang C M (PRK); L 0-4	Did not advance	3rd place, bronze medalist(s)
Vương Thị Vỹ	Featherweight (57 kg)	—N/a	Jembay C M (INA); W 4-1	Huang H (TPE); L 2-3	Did not advance		-
Lừu Thị Duyên	Lightweight (60 kg)	—N/a	Oh Y (KOR); L 0-5	Did not advance			-

== Canoeing ==
=== Sprint ===
Athlete	Event	Heats		Semifinal		Final	
Athlete	Event	Time	Rank	Time	Rank	Time	Rank
Trương Thị Phương	Women's C-1 200 m	52.806	2 QF	Bye		51.409	5
Trương Thị Phương; Nguyễn Thị Ngân	Women's C-2 500 m	—N/a				2:10.010	6

Qualification legend: QF=Final; QS=Semifinal

== Cycling ==
=== Mountain biking ===
Athlete	Event	Final	
Athlete	Event	Time	Rank
Quang Thi Soạn	Women's downhill	2:59.643	7

=== Road ===
Men

Athlete	Event	Final	
Athlete	Event	Result	Rank
Phan Hoàng Thái	Individual road race	3:27:07	16
Quang Văn Cường	Individual road race	3:28:15	20
Trần Thanh Điền	Individual road race	3:30:13	30
Huỳnh Thanh Tùng	Individual road race	3:32:21	37

Women

Athlete	Event	Final	
Athlete	Event	Result	Rank
Nguyễn Thị Thật	Individual road race	2:57:35	5
Nguyễn Thị Thi	Individual road race	2:58:40	11

== Fencing ==
Individual

Athlete	Event	Preliminary		Round of 32	Round of 16	Quarterfinals	Semifinals	Final	
Athlete	Event	Result	Rank	Opposition Score	Opposition Score	Opposition Score	Opposition Score	Opposition Score	Rank
Nguyễn Phước Đến	Men's épée	3W–3L	4 Q	A Al-Hammadi (UAE); W 13–12	O Sokolov (UZB); W 15–9	D Alexanin (KAZ); L 7–15	Did not advance		8
Nguyễn Tiến Nhật	Men's épée	2W–3L	3 Q	M Al-Shamari (QAT); W 15–7	K Kano (JPN); L 13–15	Did not advance			14
Hoàng Ngọc Hiếu	Men's foil	3W–2L	3 Q	Hoi MK (MAC); W 15–9	Ou F-m (TPE); L 9–15	Did not advance			12
Nguyễn Minh Quang	Men's foil	3W–1L	2 Q	Bye	Ha T-g (KOR); L 5–15	Did not advance			11
Nguyễn Xuân Lợi	Men's sabre	3W–2L	3 Q	Bye	K Tokunan (JPN); L 9–15	Did not advance			11
Vũ Thành An	Men's sabre	3W–2L	2 Q	Bye	IA Setiawan (INA); W 15–9	A Pakdaman (IRI); L 11–15	Did not advance		7
Nguyễn Thị Như Hoa	Women's épée	2W–3L	4 Q	DN Tannous (LBN); W 15–13	K Hsieh (HKG); L 10–13	Did not advance			16
Trần Thị Thùy Trinh	Women's épée	2W–3L	4 Q	Choi I-j (KOR); L 7–15	Did not advance				21
Đỗ Thị Anh	Women's foil	3W–2L	2 Q	Bye	K Miyawaki (JPN); L 10–15	Did not advance			11
Bùi Thị Thu Hà	Women's sabre	3W–2L	3 Q	Bye	Shao YQ (CHN); L 14–15	Did not advance			9

Team

Athlete	Event	Round of 16	Quarterfinals	Semifinals	Final	
Athlete	Event	Opposition Score	Opposition Score	Opposition Score	Opposition Score	Rank
Đặng Tuấn Anh; Nguyễn Phước Đến; Nguyễn Tiến Nhật; Trần Út Ngọc	Men's épée	Thailand (THA); W 45–40	China (CHN); L 31–45	Did not advance		5
Nguyễn Xuân Lợi; Tô Đức Anh; Vũ Thành An; Vũ Văn Hùng	Men's sabre	Bye	Hong Kong (HKG); L 36–45	Did not advance		5
Nguyễn Thị Quyên; Nguyễn Phương Kim; Nguyễn Thị Như Hoa; Trần Thị Thùy Trinh	Women's épée	Lebanon (LBN); W 45–23	South Korea (KOR); L 28–45	Did not advance		8

== Football ==
Vietnam men's football team were drawn in group D, while the women's team in group C.

Summary

Team	Event	Group Stage				Round of 16	Quarterfinal	Semifinal	Final / BM	Rank
Team	Event	Opposition Score	Opposition Score	Opposition Score	Rank	Opposition Score	Opposition Score	Opposition Score	Opposition Score	Rank
Vietnam men's	Men's tournament	Pakistan; W 3–0	Nepal; W 2–0	Japan; W 1–0	1	Bahrain; W 1–0	Syria; W 1–0	South Korea; L 1–3	United Arab Emirates; L 1–1 (3–4 PS)	4
Vietnam women's	Women's tournament	—N/a	Thailand; W 3–2	Japan; L 0–7	2	—N/a	Chinese Taipei; L 0–0 (3–4 PS)	Did not advance		5

=== Men's tournament ===
Roster

The following is the Vietnam squad in the men's football tournament of the 2018 Asian Games. The team of 20 players was officially named on 19 July.

Head coach: (South Korea) Park Hang-seo

No.	Pos.	Player	Date of birth (age)	Caps	Goals	Club
1	GK	Nguyễn Văn Hoàng	17 February 1995 (aged 23)			(Vietnam Football Federation) Sài Gòn
50	GK	Bùi Tiến Dũng	28 February 1997 (aged 21)			(Vietnam Football Federation) FLC Thanh Hóa
2	DF	Phạm Xuân Mạnh	9 February 1996 (aged 22)			(Vietnam Football Federation) Sông Lam Nghệ An
3	DF	Đỗ Duy Mạnh	29 September 1996 (aged 21)			(Vietnam Football Federation) Hà Nội
4	DF	Bùi Tiến Dũng	2 October 1995 (aged 22)			(Vietnam Football Federation) Viettel
5	DF	Đoàn Văn Hậu	19 April 1999 (aged 19)			(Vietnam Football Federation) Hà Nội
7	DF	Trịnh Văn Lợi	26 May 1995 (aged 23)			(Vietnam Football Federation) Hải Phòng
21	DF	Trần Đình Trọng	25 April 1997 (aged 21)			(Vietnam Football Federation) Hà Nội
6	MF	Lương Xuân Trường	28 April 1995 (aged 23)			(Vietnam Football Federation) Hoàng Anh Gia Lai
9	MF	Nguyễn Công Phượng	21 January 1995 (aged 23)			(Vietnam Football Federation) Hoàng Anh Gia Lai
10	MF	Nguyễn Văn Quyết* (captain)	1 July 1991 (aged 27)			(Vietnam Football Federation) Hà Nội
15	MF	Phạm Đức Huy	20 January 1995 (aged 23)			(Vietnam Football Federation) Hà Nội
16	MF	Trần Minh Vương	28 March 1995 (aged 23)			(Vietnam Football Federation) Hoàng Anh Gia Lai
17	MF	Vũ Văn Thanh	14 April 1996 (aged 22)			(Vietnam Football Federation) Hoàng Anh Gia Lai
18	MF	Đỗ Hùng Dũng*	8 September 1993 (aged 24)			(Vietnam Football Federation) Hà Nội
19	MF	Nguyễn Quang Hải	12 April 1997 (aged 21)			(Vietnam Football Federation) Hà Nội
20	MF	Phan Văn Đức	11 April 1996 (aged 22)			(Vietnam Football Federation) Sông Lam Nghệ An
8	FW	Nguyễn Văn Toàn	12 April 1996 (aged 22)			(Vietnam Football Federation) Hoàng Anh Gia Lai
11	FW	Nguyễn Anh Đức*	24 October 1985 (aged 32)			(Vietnam Football Federation) Becamex Bình Dương
13	FW	Hà Đức Chinh	22 September 1997 (aged 20)			(Vietnam Football Federation) SHB Đà Nẵng

* Over-aged player.

Group D

Pos	Team	Pld	W	D	L	GF	GA	GD	Pts	Qualification
1	Vietnam	3	3	0	0	6	0	+6	9	Advance to knockout stage
2	Japan	3	2	0	1	5	1	+4	6	Advance to knockout stage
3	Pakistan	3	1	0	2	2	8	−6	3	
4	Nepal	3	0	0	3	1	5	−4	0	

Source: Asian Games 2018
Rules for classification: Group stage tiebreakers
14 August 2018
16:00 UTC+7

Vietnam	3–0	Pakistan
Nguyễn Quang Hải 21'; Nguyễn Văn Quyết 41'; Nguyễn Công Phượng 72'	Report

Wibawa Mukti Stadium, Cikarang
Referee: Ahmad Yaqoub Ibrahim (Jordan)

16 August 2018
19:00 UTC+7

Nepal	0–2	Vietnam
	Report	Nguyễn Anh Đức 31'; Phan Văn Đức 63'

Wibawa Mukti Stadium, Cikarang
Referee: Zhang Lei (China)

19 August 2018
16:00 UTC+7

Japan	0–1	Vietnam
	Report	Nguyễn Quang Hải 3'

Wibawa Mukti Stadium, Cikarang
Referee: Lau Fong Hei (Hong Kong)

Round of 16

23 August 2018
19:30 UTC+7

Vietnam	1–0	Bahrain
Nguyễn Công Phượng 88'	Report

Patriot Candrabhaga Stadium, Bekasi
Referee: Zhang Lei (China)

Quarter-final

27 August 2018
19:30 UTC+7

Syria	0–1 (a.e.t.)	Vietnam
	Report	Nguyễn Văn Toàn 108'

Patriot Candrabhaga Stadium, Bekasi
Referee: Bijan Heidari (Iran)

Semi-final

29 August 2018
16:00 UTC+7

Vietnam	1–3	South Korea
Trần Minh Vương 70'	Report	Lee Seung-woo 7', 55'; Hwang Ui-jo 28'

Pakansari Stadium, Cibinong
Referee: Masoud Tufaylieh (Syria)

Bronze medal match

1 September 2018
15:00 UTC+7

Vietnam	1–1	United Arab Emirates
Nguyễn Văn Quyết 27'	Report	Al-Attas 17'
Penalties
Vũ Văn Thanh (penalty scored); Nguyễn Quang Hải (penalty missed); Hà Đức Chinh (penalty scored); Phan Văn Đức (penalty scored); Trần Minh Vương (penalty missed)	3–4	(penalty scored) Al-Attas; (penalty scored) Z. Al-Ameri; (penalty scored) Ibrahim; (penalty scored) Suroor

Pakansari Stadium, Cibinong
Referee: Kim Dae-yong (South Korea)

=== Women's tournament ===
Roster

The following is the Vietnam squad in the women's football tournament of the 2018 Asian Games. The team of 20 players was officially named on 11 August.

Head coach: Mai Đức Chung

No.	Pos.	Player	Date of birth (age)	Club
1	GK	Trần Thị Hải Yến	12 September 1998 (aged 19)	(Vietnam Football Federation) Hà Nam
14	GK	Trần Thị Kim Thanh	18 September 1993 (aged 24)	(Vietnam Football Federation) Hồ Chí Minh City
22	GK	Khổng Thị Hằng	10 October 1993 (aged 24)	(Vietnam Football Federation) Than Khoáng Sản
2	DF	Trần Thị Hồng Nhung	28 October 1992 (aged 25)	(Vietnam Football Federation) Hà Nam
3	DF	Chương Thị Kiều	19 August 1995 (aged 22)	(Vietnam Football Federation) Hồ Chí Minh City
4	DF	Nguyễn Thanh Huyền	12 August 1996 (aged 22)	(Vietnam Football Federation) Hà Nội
5	DF	Bùi Thị Thúy	17 July 1998 (aged 20)	(Vietnam Football Federation) Than Khoáng Sản
6	DF	Bùi Thúy An	5 October 1990 (aged 27)	(Vietnam Football Federation) Hà Nội
13	DF	Nguyễn Thị Mỹ Anh	27 November 1994 (aged 23)	(Vietnam Football Federation) Hồ Chí Minh City
15	DF	Phạm Thị Tươi	26 June 1993 (aged 25)	(Vietnam Football Federation) Hà Nam
7	MF	Nguyễn Thị Tuyết Dung	13 December 1993 (aged 24)	(Vietnam Football Federation) Hà Nam
8	MF	Nguyễn Thị Liễu	18 September 1992 (aged 25)	(Vietnam Football Federation) Hà Nam
11	MF	Thái Thị Thảo	12 February 1995 (aged 23)	(Vietnam Football Federation) Hà Nội
17	MF	Đinh Thị Thùy Dung	25 August 1998 (aged 19)	(Vietnam Football Federation) Than Khoáng Sản
18	MF	Nguyễn Thị Vạn	10 January 1997 (aged 21)	(Vietnam Football Federation) Than Khoáng Sản
20	MF	Hà Thị Nhài	15 March 1998 (aged 20)	(Vietnam Football Federation) Than Khoáng Sản
23	MF	Phạm Hoàng Quỳnh	20 September 1992 (aged 25)	(Vietnam Football Federation) Than Khoáng Sản
9	FW	Huỳnh Như	28 November 1991 (aged 26)	(Vietnam Football Federation) Hồ Chí Minh City
12	FW	Phạm Hải Yến	9 November 1994 (aged 23)	(Vietnam Football Federation) Hà Nội
21	FW	Nguyễn Thị Thúy Hằng	19 November 1997 (aged 20)	(Vietnam Football Federation) Than Khoáng Sản

Group C

Pos	Team	Pld	W	D	L	GF	GA	GD	Pts	Qualification
1	Japan	2	2	0	0	9	0	+9	6	Advance to Knockout stage
2	Vietnam	2	1	0	1	3	9	−6	3	Advance to Knockout stage
3	Thailand	2	0	0	2	2	5	−3	0	Advance to Knockout stage

Source: Asian Games 2018
Rules for classification: Group stage tiebreakers
19 August 2018
18:30 UTC+7

Vietnam	3–2	Thailand
Nguyễn Thị Tuyết Dung 22'; Nguyễn Thị Vạn 33'; Nguyễn Thị Liễu 40'	Report	Suchawadee 30' (pen.); Pitsamai 79'

Bumi Sriwijaya Stadium, Palembang
Referee: Mahsa Ghorbani (Iran)

21 August 2018
15:00 UTC+7

Japan	7–0	Vietnam
Sugasawa 5', 77'; Momiki 17'; Nakajima 38'; Tanaka 52', 88'; Masuya 64'	Report

Gelora Sriwijaya Stadium, Palembang
Referee: Thein Thein Aye (Myanmar)

Quarter-final

24 August 2018
19:30 UTC+7

Chinese Taipei	0–0 (a.e.t.)	Vietnam
	Report
Penalties
Yu Hsiu-chin (penalty scored); Lin Ya-han (penalty scored); Liu Chien-yun (penalty scored); Michelle Pao (penalty scored)	4–3	(penalty scored) Nguyễn Thị Tuyết Dung; (penalty scored) Chương Thị Kiều; (penalty missed) Phạm Hoàng Quỳnh; (penalty scored) Nguyễn Thị Mỹ Anh; (penalty missed) Thái Thị Thảo

Gelora Sriwijaya Stadium, Palembang
Referee: Oh Hyeon-jeong (South Korea)

== Golf ==
Men

Athlete	Event	Round 1	Round 2	Round 3	Round 4	Total		
Athlete	Event	Score	Score	Score	Score	Score	Par	Rank
Nguyễn Hùng Dũng	Individual	81	79	80	80	320	+32	66=
Nguyễn Phương Toàn	Individual	83	79	71	74	307	+19	51=
Thái Trung Hiếu	Individual	80	78	76	86	320	+32	66=
Trương Chí Quân	Individual	71	80	74	75	300	+12	40
Team Vietnam; Nguyễn Hùng Dũng; Nguyễn Phương Toàn; Thái Trung Hiếu; Trương Chí Quân	Team	232	236	221	229	918	+54	12

Women

Athlete	Event	Round 1	Round 2	Round 3	Round 4	Total		
Athlete	Event	Score	Score	Score	Score	Score	Par	Rank
Đoàn Xuân Minh Khuê	Individual	86	79	83	83	331	+43	34=
Trần Chiêu Dương	Individual	90	86	83	87	346	+58	38
Team Vietnam; Đoàn Xuân Minh Khuê; Trần Chiêu Dương	Team	176	165	166	170	677	+101	14

== Jujitsu ==
Key

- Bye = Athlete not required to compete in round
- N/A = Round not applicable for the event

Athlete	Event	1/16 Finals	1/8 Finals	1/4 Finals	Final of Tables	Final	Rank
Athlete	Event	Opposition Result	Opposition Result	Opposition Result	Opposition Result	Opposition Result	Rank
Đào Hồng Sơn	Newaza Men's -56 kg	—N/a	Bye	Alblooshi K (UAE); L 0-100 SUB	did not advance		-
Dương Thị Thanh Minh	Newaza Women's -49 kg	Tobing C L (INA); W 5-0 PTS	Avezmetova S (TKM); W 3-0 PTS	Ochoa M (PHI); W 0-0 ADV	Alhinaai M (UAE); L 0-14 PTS	Alyafei W (UAE); W 3-0 PTS	3rd place, bronze medalist(s)
Đào Lê Thu Trang	Newaza Women's -49 kg	Bye	Pirhady N (IRI); L 0-2 PTS	did not advance			-
Nguyễn Thị Hương	Newaza Women's -62 kg	Bye	Tsogkhuu U (MGL); L 0-0 ADV	did not advance			-

== Judo ==
Vietnam will participate in judo at the Games with 7 judokas (2 men's and 5 women's).

Men

Athlete	Event	Round of 32	Round of 16	Quarterfinals	Semifinals	Repechage	Final/BM	Rank
Athlete	Event	Opposition Result	Opposition Result	Opposition Result	Opposition Result	Opposition Result	Opposition Result	Rank
Phan Vu Nam	66 kg							
Nguyen Tan Cong	73 kg							

Women

Athlete	Event	Round of 32	Round of 16	Quarterfinals	Semifinals	Repechage	Final/BM	Rank
Athlete	Event	Opposition Result	Opposition Result	Opposition Result	Opposition Result	Opposition Result	Opposition Result	Rank
Hoang Thi Tinh	48 kg							
Nguyen Thuy	52 kg							
Nguyen Thi Bich Ngoc	57 kg							
Nguyen Ngoc Diem Phuong	63 kg							
Nguyen Thi Dieu Tien	70 kg							

== Karate ==
Key

- Bye = Athlete not required to compete in round
- N/A = Round not applicable for the event

Men

Athlete	Event	1/16 Finals	Repechage Round 2	1/8 Finals	Final of Repechage	Quarterfinals	Semifinals	Finals/BM	Rank
Athlete	Event	Opposition Result	Opposition Result	Opposition Result	Opposition Result	Opposition Result	Opposition Result	Opposition Result	Rank
Nguyễn Văn Hải	Kumite 60 kg	Bye		Lama S (NEP); W 3-0	Macaalay J R (PHI); W 4-0	Mahdi Zadeh A (IRI); L 0-0	Bye	Saymatov S (UZB); L 1-8	-
Nguyễn Thanh Duy	Kumite 67 kg	Simanjuntak J (INA); L 0-1	Did not advance						-
Chu Đức Thịnh	Kumite 75 kg	Bye		Alnajjar B (JOR); L 1-5	Did not advance				-
Nguyễn Minh Phụng	Kumite +84 kg	—N/a		Haider E Qarar M U R (AFG); W 3-0	Bye	Khair M (JOR); W 6-3	Yuldashev D (KAZ); W 6-6	Ganjzadeh S (IRI); L 5-2	2nd place, silver medalist(s)

Women

Athlete	Event	1/8 Finals	Final of Repechage	Quarterfinals	Semifinals	Finals/BM	Rank
Athlete	Event	Opposition Result	Opposition Result	Opposition Result	Opposition Result	Opposition Result	Rank
Nguyễn Thị Phương	Individual kata	Kautsar Mastura N (INA); W 3-2	Bye	Lau M S G (HKG); L 1-4	Did not advance		-
Hồ Thị Thu Hiền	Kumite 61 kg	Mogul S (AFG); W 5-1	Choi W Y (HKG); L 0-1	Yin X (CHN); L 1-4	Did not advance		-
Nguyễn Thị Ngoan	Kumite 68 kg	Georgia Zefanya C (INA); W 3-1	Bye	Kulsoom (PAK); W 5-0	Gafurova G (KAZ); L 5-8	Zangenehkarkooti P (IRI); L 0-10	-
Nguyễn Thị Hồng Anh	Kumite +68 kg	—N/a		Uekusa A (JPN); L 1-2	Bye	Abbasali H (IRI); L 0-3	-

== Kurash ==
Key

- Bye = Athlete not required to compete in round
- N/A = Round not applicable for the event

Men

Athlete	Event	Round of 32	Round of 16	Quarterfinals	Semifinals	Final	Rank
Athlete	Event	Opposition Result	Opposition Result	Opposition Result	Opposition Result	Opposition Result	Rank
Nguyễn Hải Ba	66 kg	Aldaberganov N (KAZ); L 0-10	Did not advance				-
Bùi Minh Quân	81 kg	Murodov A (TJK); L 0-10	Did not advance				-
Lê Anh Tài	90 kg	Muzapparov Y (KAZ); L 0-3	Did not advance				-
Nguyễn Châu Hoàng Lân	+90 kg	Kawaguchi T (JPN); L 0-10	Did not advance				-

Women

Athlete	Event	Round of 32	Round of 16	Quarterfinals	Semifinals	Final	Rank
Athlete	Event	Opposition Result	Opposition Result	Opposition Result	Opposition Result	Opposition Result	Rank
Nguyễn Ngọc Ngân	52 kg	Susanti R T K (INA); L 0-5	Did not advance				-
Văn Ngọc Tú	52 kg	Bye	Seesai N (THA); W 10-0	Jadhav M Y (IND); L 0-5	Did not advance		-
Nguyễn Thị Thanh Trâm	63 kg	Bye	Abdumalikova M (UZB); L 0-10	Did not advance			-
Nguyễn Thị Lan	78 kg	Bye	Tokas A (IND); W 5-0	Amankhanova G (KAZ); W 1-0	Otgon M (MGL); L 0-10	Did not advance	3rd place, bronze medalist(s)
Trần Thị Thanh Thủy	78 kg	Bye	Taizhanova K (KAZ); L 0-5	Did not advance			-

== Pencak silat ==
Key

- Bye = Athlete not required to compete in round
- N/A = Round not applicable for the event

=== Seni events ===
Men

Athlete	Event	Preliminary		Final	
Athlete	Event	Result	Rank in Group	Result	Rank
Vũ Tiến Dũng	Single	452	2	435	4
Trần Đức Danh; Lê Hồng Quân	Double	—N/a		562	2nd place, silver medalist(s)
Vũ Tiến Dũng; Nguyễn Xuân Thành; Lưu Văn Nam	Team	—N/a		450	2nd place, silver medalist(s)

Women

Athlete	Event	Preliminary		Final	
Athlete	Event	Result	Rank in Group	Result	Rank
Vương Thị Bình	Single	447	2	434	6
Nguyễn Thị Thu Hà; Nguyễn Thị Huyền	Double	—N/a		544	6
Nguyễn Thị Thu Hà; Nguyễn Thị Huyền; Vương Thị Bình	Team	—N/a		464	2nd place, silver medalist(s)

=== Tanding events ===
Men

Athlete	Event	Round of 16	Quarterfinal	Semifinal	Final	Rank
Athlete	Event	Opposition Result	Opposition Result	Opposition Result	Opposition Result	Rank
Nguyễn Đình Tuấn	50-55 kg	Malik A (INA); L 1-3	Did not advance			-
Nguyễn Thái Linh	55-60 kg	Bye	Havasi H (IRI); W 5-0	Amzad M H (MAS); W 5-0	Yudani Kusumah H (INA); L 2-3	2nd place, silver medalist(s)
Nguyễn Ngọc Toàn	60-65 kg	Bye	Vongphakdy M (LAO); W 5-0	Loon J R (PHI); W 5-0	Pratama I C (INA); L 1-4	2nd place, silver medalist(s)
Phạm Tuấn Anh	65-70 kg	Botsavang O K (LAO); W 5-0	Phuttan W (THA); W 5-0	Adi Putra K H (INA); L 0-5	Did not advance	3rd place, bronze medalist(s)
Trần Đình Nam	70-75 kg	Bye	Kubaha K (THA); W 5-0	Tokurov D (KGZ); W 5-0	Khalid M F (MAS); W 5-0	1st place, gold medalist(s)
Nguyễn Duy Tuyến	85-90 kg	—N/a	Phimmasone S (LAO); W 5-0	Pamungkas A B (INA); L 0-5	Did not advance	3rd place, bronze medalist(s)
Nguyễn Văn Trí	90-95 kg	Bye	Amankulov R (KGZ); W 5-0	Sheik Alauddin S F (SGP); W 5-0	Yaacob M K (MAS); W 5-0	1st place, gold medalist(s)

Women

Athlete	Event	Round of 16	Quarterfinal	Semifinal	Final	Rank
Athlete	Event	Opposition Result	Opposition Result	Opposition Result	Opposition Result	Rank
Trần Thị Thêm	50-55 kg	Bye	Rabbimova M (UZB); W 5-0	Mohd Saiful N S (SGP); W 4-1	Wita W (INA); L 0-5	2nd place, silver medalist(s)
Hoàng Thị Loan	55-60 kg	Bye	Borre P J (PHI); W 5-0	Monita S T (INA); L 0-5	Did not advance	3rd place, bronze medalist(s)
Nguyễn Thị Cẩm Nhi	60-65 kg	—N/a	Mohamed Nasir S R (MAS); W 5-0	Karbalaei Sadeghi T (IRI); W 5-0	Kamelia P (INA); L 0-5	2nd place, silver medalist(s)

== Rowing ==
Men

Athlete	Event	Heats		Repechages		Finals	
Athlete	Event	Time	Rank	Time	Rank	Time	Rank
Hoàng Văn Đạt; Lê Thắng; Nguyễn Hữu Thành; Phan Mạnh Linh	Lightweight coxless four	7:19.47	6 R	7:17.24 ELM	5	Did not advance	
Bùi Quang Huy; Đàm Đình Chiều; Hoàng Thanh Trung; Nguyễn Bá Nam; Phạm Chung; Trần Quang Tùng; Võ Như Sang; Vũ Viết Tuấn	Lightweight eight	6:40.28	6 R	6:32.62	4 FA	6:27.80	6

Women

Athlete	Event	Heats		Repechages		Finals	
Athlete	Event	Time	Rank	Time	Rank	Time	Rank
Nguyễn Thị Hải	Single sculls	9:43.90	8 R	8:43.95	4 FA	8:28.84	5
Lê Thị Hiền; Phạm Thị Huệ	Coxless pair	9:00.43	7 R	8:55.01	4 FB	8:50.13	9
Đinh Thị Hảo; Lê Thị Hiền; Phạm Thị Huệ; Trần Thị An	Coxless four	7:23.98	3 R	7:29.34	1 FA	7:14.52	2nd place, silver medalist(s)
Nguyễn Thị Giang	Lightweight single sculls	8:53.28	5 FA	—N/a		8:43.53	5
Hồ Thị Lý; Lường Thị Thảo; Phạm Thị Thảo; Tạ Thanh Huyền	Lightweight quadruple sculls	7:24.57	2 FA	Bye		7:01.11	1st place, gold medalist(s)

== Sambo ==
Key:

- TT – Won by total throw.

Athlete	Event	Round of 32	Round of 16	Quarterfinal	Semifinal	Repechage 1	Repechage 2	Repechage final	Final / BM	
Athlete	Event	Opposition Result	Opposition Result	Opposition Result	Opposition Result	Opposition Result	Opposition Result	Opposition Result	Opposition Result	Rank
Cấn Thị Hồng	Women's 48 kg	—N/a	N Gulova (UZB); L 0–4^{TT}	Did not advance			—N/a	Did not advance		

== Sepak takraw ==
Key

- N/A = Round not applicable for the event

Men

Athlete	Event	Preliminary (group stage)						Semifinals	Gold Medal Match	Rank
Athlete	Event	Opposition Result	Opposition Result	Opposition Result	Opposition Result	Points	Rank	Opposition Result	Opposition Result	Rank
Đỗ Mạnh Tuấn; Nguyễn Quốc Anh; Nguyễn Hoàng Lân; Nguyễn Hữu Danh; Đầu Văn Hoàng; Lê Văn Nghĩa	Quadrant	Nepal; W 2-0	Iran; W 2-0	Singapore; W 2-1	Pakistan; W 2-0	8	1 SF	Japan; L 0-2	Did not advance	3rd place, bronze medalist(s)
Đỗ Mạnh Tuấn; Nguyễn Quốc Anh; Nguyễn Hoàng Lân; Nguyễn Hữu Danh; Đầu Văn Hoàng; Lê Văn Nghĩa	Team doubles	Philippines; L 1-2	Japan; W 2-1	Indonesia; L 0-3	—N/a	2	4 ELM	Did not advance		-

Women

Athlete	Event	Preliminary (group stage)						Semifinals	Gold Medal Match	Rank
Athlete	Event	Opposition Result	Opposition Result	Opposition Result	Opposition Result	Points	Rank	Opposition Result	Opposition Result	Rank
Nguyễn Thị Quyên; Giáp Thị Hiền; Dương Thị Xuyến; Nguyễn Thị Phương Trinh; Nguyễn Thị Mỹ; Hoàng Thị Hoa	Quadrant	Thailand; L 0-2	India; W 2-0	Malaysia; W 2-0	Japan; W 2-1	3	2 SF	Indonesia; W 2-1	Thailand; L 0-2	2nd place, silver medalist(s)
Nguyễn Thị Quyên; Giáp Thị Hiền; Nguyễn Thị Thu Hạnh; Dương Thị Xuyến; Đặng Thị Phương Thanh; Hoàng Thị Hoa; Bùi Thị Hải Yến; Phạm Thị Hằng; Nguyễn Thị Phương Trinh; Trần Thị Thu Hoài; Nguyễn Thị Mỹ; Đặng Thị Mỹ Linh	Team regu	Malaysia; W 3-0	Myanmar; W 2-1	Japan; W 2-1	Indonesia; W 2-1	4	1 SF	South Korea; L 0-2	Did not advance	3rd place, bronze medalist(s)

== Shooting ==
Key

- N/A = Round not applicable for event

Men

Athlete	Event	Qualification				Final	
Athlete	Event	Stage 1		Stage 2		Final	
Athlete	Event	Result	Rank	Result	Rank	Result	Rank
Nguyễn Duy Hoàng	10m air rifle	612.6	30	—N/a		Did not advance	
Nguyễn Duy Hoàng	50m rifle 3 positions	1129	27	—N/a		Did not advance	
Nguyễn Thành Nam	10m air rifle	610.8	33	—N/a		Did not advance	
Nguyễn Thành Nam	50m rifle 3 positions	1134	23	—N/a		Did not advance	
Hoàng Xuân Vinh	10m air pistol	579	9	—N/a		Did not advance	
Trần Quốc Cường	10m air pistol	574	14	—N/a		Did not advance	
Phan Công Minh	25m rapid fire pistol	291	7	579	5 QF	13	5
Hà Minh Thành	25m rapid fire pistol	289	10	579	6 QF	20	4
Nguyễn Hoàng Điệp	Trap	68	19	113	21	Did not advance	
Lê Nghĩa	Trap	67	23	111	25	Did not advance	
Ngô Hữu Vượng	10m running target	288	3	571	2 QF	6	3rd place, bronze medalist(s)
Ngô Hữu Vượng	10m running target mixed	—N/a				374	8
Trần Hoàng Vũ	10m running target	285	7	556	12	Did not advance	
Trần Hoàng Vũ	10m running target mixed	—N/a				366	11

Women

Athlete	Event	Qualification				Final	
Athlete	Event	Stage 1		Stage 2		Final	
Athlete	Event	Result	Rank	Result	Rank	Result	Rank
Nguyễn Huyền Trang	10m air rifle	617.4	21	—N/a		Did not advance	
Nguyễn Huyền Trang	50m rifle 3 positions	1137	23	—N/a		Did not advance	
Iwaki Ai	10m air rifle	613.0	24	—N/a		Did not advance	
Nguyễn Thị Ngân	50m rifle 3 positions	1139	21	—N/a		Did not advance	
Bùi Thúy Thu Thủy	10m air pistol	570	8 QF	—N/a		134.0	7
Lê Thị Linh Chi	10m air pistol	566	18	—N/a		Did not advance	
Lê Thị Linh Chi	25m pistol	286	12	575	15	Did not advance	
Phạm Thị Hà	25m pistol	281	26	573	18	Did not advance	

Mixed

Athlete	Event	Qualification		Final	
Athlete	Event	Result	Rank	Result	Rank
Iwaki Ai; Nguyễn Duy Hoàng	10m air rifle	806.4	20	Did not advance	
Lê Thị Linh Chi; Trần Quốc Cường	10m air pistol	762	4 QF	407.5	3rd place, bronze medalist(s)

== Soft tennis ==
Athlete	Event	Group Stage				Quarterfinals	Semifinals	Final	
Athlete	Event	Opposition Score	Opposition Score	Opposition Score	Rank	Opposition Score	Opposition Score	Opposition Score	Rank
Lê Phước Vĩnh	Men's singles	S Vannasak (LAO); L 2–4	S Doeum (CAM); L 2–4	AE Sie (INA); L 0–4	4	Did not advance			
Trần Văn Chiến	Men's singles	Chen Y-h (TPE); L 0–4	K Nagae (JPN); L 0–4	P Inthalangsy (LAO); L 0–4	4	Did not advance			
Trần Thanh Hoàng Ngân	Women's singles	Wang YF (CHN); L 0–4	Chen C-l (TPE); L 0–4	Hong J-s (PRK); L 0–4	4	Did not advance			
Lâm Quang Trí; Trần Thanh Hoàng Ngân	Mixed doubles	Kim M-h / So J-i (PRK); L 0–5	M. Anugerah / V Darlina (INA); L 0–5	MA Alcoseba / PL Catindig (PHI); L 2–5	4	Did not advance			
Lê Phước Vĩnh; Trần Văn Chiến; Lâm Quang Trí	Men's team	Thailand (THA); L 0–3	Chinese Taipei (TPE); L 0–3	Mongolia (MGL); L 0–3	4	Did not advance			

== Swimming ==
Key

- N/A = Round not applicable for the event

Men's events

Athlete	Event	Heats		Final	
Athlete	Event	Time	Rank	Time	Rank
Ngô Đình Chuyền	50m freestyle	24.49	34	Did not advance	
Ngô Đình Chuyền	100m freestyle	52.14	31	Did not advance	
Ngô Đình Chuyền	100m butterfly	55.97	22	Did not advance	
Hoàng Quý Phước	100m freestyle	50.44	15	Did not advance	
Hoàng Quý Phước	200m freestyle	1:49.68 Q	8	1:50.57	8
Hoàng Quý Phước	100m butterfly	56.51	24	Did not advance	
Nguyễn Hữu Kim Sơn	400m freestyle	3:54.01 Q	6	3:51.67	6
Nguyễn Hữu Kim Sơn	400m individual medley	4:27.18 Q	8	4:22.86	6
Nguyễn Huy Hoàng	400m freestyle	4:10.66	17	Did not advance	
Nguyễn Huy Hoàng	1500m freestyle	—N/a		15:01.63	2nd place, silver medalist(s)
Nguyễn Huy Hoàng	800m freestyle	—N/a		7:54.32	3rd place, bronze medalist(s)
Lê Nguyễn Paul	50m backstroke	26.20	11	Did not advance	
Lê Nguyễn Paul	100m breaststroke	55.47 Q	6	55.72	6
Lê Nguyễn Paul	200m backstroke	2:10.64	15	Did not advance	
Lê Nguyễn Paul	50m butterfly	24.21 Q	8	24.35	6
Lê Nguyễn Paul	200m individual medley	2:05.08	11	Did not advance	
Phạm Thanh Bảo	50m breaststroke	29.75	25	Did not advance	
Phạm Thanh Bảo	100m breaststroke	1:03.47	18	Did not advance	
Phạm Thanh Bảo	200m breaststroke	2:16.51	9	Did not advance	
Hoàng Quý Phước; Ngô Đình Chuyền; Nguyễn Hữu Kim Sơn; Nguyễn Huy Hoàng	4 × 200m freestyle relay	7:30.37 Q	5	7:32.02	6
Lê Nguyễn Paul; Phạm Thanh Bảo; Hoàng Quý Phước; Ngô Đình Chuyền	4 × 100m medley relay	3:45.76	11	Did not advance	

Women's events

Athlete	Event	Heats		Final	
Athlete	Event	Time	Rank	Time	Rank
Mai Thị Linh	200m freestyle	2:08.85	17	Did not advance	
Mai Thị Linh	400m freestyle	4:31.99	13	Did not advance	
Mai Thị Linh	1500m freestyle	—N/a		17:40.56	10
Mai Thị Linh	800m freestyle	—N/a		9:18.91	14
Mai Thị Linh	400m individual medley	5:03.65	9	Did not advance	
Ngô Thị Ngọc Quỳnh	50m breaststroke	33.89	17	Did not advance	
Ngô Thị Ngọc Quỳnh	100m breaststroke	1:15.19	17	Did not advance	
Ngô Thị Ngọc Quỳnh	200m breaststroke	2:44.84	13	Did not advance	
Lê Thị Mỹ Thảo	100m butterfly	1:01.26	11	Did not advance	
Lê Thị Mỹ Thảo	200m butterfly	2:12.14 Q	4	2:13.93	7
Nguyễn Thị Ánh Viên	200m individual medley	2:19.79	11	Did not advance	
Nguyễn Thị Ánh Viên	400m individual medley	4:47.56 Q	4	4:42.81	5

== Table tennis ==
Individual

Athlete	Event	Round 1	Round 2	Round of 16	Quarterfinals	Semifinals	Final	
Athlete	Event	Opposition Score	Opposition Score	Opposition Score	Opposition Score	Opposition Score	Opposition Score	Rank
Nguyễn Anh Tú	Men's singles	Al-Balooshi (UAE); W 4–0	N Alamian (IRI); L 0–4	Did not advance				
Nguyễn Đức Tuấn	Men's singles	M Hamie (LBN); W 4–3	Ho KK (HKG); L 2–4	Did not advance				
Nguyễn Khoa Diệu Khánh	Women's singles	M Khory (LBN); W 4–1	Chen M (CHN); L 0–4	Did not advance				
Nguyễn Thị Nga	Women's singles	Bye	M Ando (JPN); L 1–4	Did not advance				
Đinh Quang Linh; Mai Hoàng Mỹ Trang	Mixed doubles	Bye	Gao N / Yu MY (SGP); L 1–3	Did not advance				
Lê Đình Đức; Nguyễn Thị Nga	Mixed doubles	Bye	Pak S-h / Kim N-h (PRK); L 0–3	Did not advance				

Team

Athlete	Event	Group Stage					Quarterfinal	Semifinal	Final	
Athlete	Event	Opposition Score	Opposition Score	Opposition Score	Opposition Score	Rank	Opposition Score	Opposition Score	Opposition Score	Rank
Đinh Quang Linh; Nguyễn Anh Tú; Nguyễn Đức Tuấn; Lê Tiến Đạt; Lê Đình Đức	Men's	United Arab Emirates (UAE); W 3–0	Chinese Taipei (TPE); L 0–3	Macau (MAC); W 3–0	India (IND); L 0–3	3	Did not advance			
Nguyễn Khoa Diệu Khánh; Nguyễn Thị Nga; Mai Hoàng Mỹ Trang; Phạm Dạ Thảo; Phan Hoàng Tường Giang	Women's	Hong Kong (HKG); L 0–3	Malaysia (MAS); L 2–3	Singapore (SGP); L 0–3	Nepal (NEP); W 3–0	4	Did not advance			

== Taekwondo ==
Poomsae

Athlete	Event	Round of 16	Quarterfinal	Semifinal	Final	
Athlete	Event	Opposition Score	Opposition Score	Opposition Score	Opposition Score	Rank
Nguyễn Thiên Phụng	Men's individual	Pongporn Suvittayarak (THA); L 7.98–8.14	Did not advance			
Nguyễn Thiên Phụng; Lê Thanh Trung; Trần Tiến Khoa	Men's team	Bye	Chinese Taipei; W 8.39–8.26	South Korea; L 8.32–8.42	Did not advance	3rd place, bronze medalist(s)
Châu Tuyết Vân	Women's individual	Jocel Lyn Ninobla (PHI); W 8.11–7.89	Defia Rosmaniar (INA); L 8.33–8.46	Did not advance		
Nguyễn Thị Lê Kim; Châu Tuyết Vân; Ngô Thị Thuỳ Dung	Women's team	China; W 7.99–7.92	South Korea; L 8.13–8.24	Did not advance		

Kyorugi

Athlete	Event	Round of 32	Round of 16	Quarterfinal	Semifinal	Final	
Athlete	Event	Opposition Score	Opposition Score	Opposition Score	Opposition Score	Opposition Score	Rank
Võ Quốc Hưng	Men's −58 kg	Thisara Dharmapriya (SRI)					
Lý Hồng Phúc	Men's −68 kg	Chu Kai Ching (HKG)					
Trương Thị Kim Tuyến	Women's −49 kg	Bye	Miyu Yamada (JPN)				
Hồ Thị Kim Ngân	Women's −53 kg	Bye	Liu Kaiqi (CHN)				
Phạm Thị Thu Hiền	Women's −57 kg	Cassie Tubbs (LAO)					
Bạc Thị Khiêm	Women's −67 kg	—N/a	Melika Mirhosseini (IRI)				
Lâm Thị Hà Thanh	Women's +67 kg	—N/a	Delva Rizki (INA)				

== Tennis ==
Men

Athlete	Event	Round of 64	Round of 32	Round of 16	Quarterfinals	Semifinals	Final / BM	
Athlete	Event	Opposition Score	Opposition Score	Opposition Score	Opposition Score	Opposition Score	Opposition Score	Rank
Lý Hoàng Nam	Singles	Bye	AS Waheed (MDV); W 6–0, 4–0^{r}	P Gunneswaran (IND); L 3–6, 7–5, 4–6	Did not advance			
Trịnh Linh Giang	Singles	A Bastola (NEP); W 1–6, 6–3, 6–3	D Yevseyev (KAZ); L 1–6, 1–6	Did not advance				
Phạm Minh Tuấn; Trịnh Linh Giang	Doubles	S-c Hong / J-m Lee (KOR); L 2–6, 2–6	Did not advance					
Lý Hoàng Nam; Nguyễn Văn Phương	Doubles	Bye	S Shimabukuro / K Uesugi (JPN); L 2–6, 6–4, [2]–[10]	Did not advance				

Women

Athlete	Event	Round of 64	Round of 32	Round of 16	Quarterfinals	Semifinals	Final / BM	
Athlete	Event	Opposition Score	Opposition Score	Opposition Score	Opposition Score	Opposition Score	Opposition Score	Rank
Savanna Lý-Nguyễn	Singles	Bye	N-l Han (KOR); L 2–6, 1–6	Did not advance				
Csilla Fodor	Singles	Mah Rana (NEP); W 6–0, 6–1	S Sharipova (UZB); L 5–7, 3–6	Did not advance				
Csilla Fodor; Savanna Lý-Nguyễn	Doubles	—N/a	G Pakbaten / S Sadeghvaziri (IRI); W 7^{8}–6^{6}, 6–1	N-r Kim / N-l Han (KOR); L 1–6, 0–4	Did not advance			

Mixed

Athlete	Event	Round of 32	Round of 16	Quarterfinals	Semifinals	Final / BM	
Athlete	Event	Opposition Score	Opposition Score	Opposition Score	Opposition Score	Opposition Score	Rank
Csilla Fodor; Phạm Minh Tuấn	Mixed	A Danilina / A Nedovyesov (KAZ); L 4–6, 4–6	Did not advance				
Savanna Lý-Nguyễn; Nguyễn Văn Phương	Mixed	G Ainitdinova / T Khabibulin (KAZ); L 2–6, 2–6	Did not advance				

== Volleyball ==
The Volleyball Federation of Vietnam (VFV) sent the men's team who competed in pool E and the women's team in pool B at the Games. VFV also entered 4 beach volleyball pairs at the Games.

=== Beach volleyball ===
Athlete	Event	Preliminary		Round of 16	Quarterfinals	Semifinals	Final / BM	
Athlete	Event	Oppositions Scores	Rank	Opposition Score	Opposition Score	Opposition Score	Opposition Score	Rank
Phạm Lê Đình Khôi; Nguyễn Bá Trường Đăng	Men's tournament	Ageba – Shiratori (JPN): L 0–2; Alikhail – Mayar (AFG): W 2–0; Wu – Aboduhalikejiang (CHN): L 0–2	3	Did not advance				
Nguyễn Ngọc Quý; Lý Văn Quốc	Men's tournament	Hasegawa – Shimizu (JPN): L 0–2; I F Xavier – R F Xavier (TLS): W 2–0; Mirzaali – Raoufi (IRI): L 0–2	3	Did not advance				
Trần Cẩm Thi; Trương Dương Thị Mỹ Huyền	Women's tournament	Ishii – Murakami (JPN): L 0–2; Yu – Pan (TPE): L 0–2; Wang – Zeng (CHN): L 1–2	4	Did not advance				
Nguyễn Thị Cẩm Tiên; Huỳnh Đỗ Hồng Loan	Women's tournament	Juliana – Utami (INA): L 0–2; Wong – Ng (HKG): L 1–2; Radarong – Udomchavee (THA):L 0–2; Mashkova – Tsimbalova (KAZ): L 0–2	5	Did not advance				

=== Indoor volleyball ===
Team	Event	Group Stage		Playoffs	Quarterfinals / Pl.	Semifinals / Pl.	Final / BM / Pl.	
Team	Event	Oppositions Scores	Rank	Opposition Score	Opposition Score	Opposition Score	Opposition Score	Rank
Vietnam men's	Men's tournament	China: W 3–2; Sri Lanka: L 0–3; Thailand: L 1–3	4	Did not advance	Hong Kong; W 3–1	Kyrgyzstan; W 3–0	Sri Lanka; L 0–3	14
Vietnam women's	Women's tournament	China: L 0–3; India: W 3–0; Chinese Taipei: L 2–3; South Korea: L 0–3; Kazakhstan: W 3–2	4 Q	—N/a	Thailand; L 0–3	Indonesia; W 3–1	Kazakhstan; L 1–3	6

==== Men's tournament ====
Team roster

The following is the Vietnam roster in the men's volleyball tournament of the 2018 Asian Games.

Head coach: Phùng Công Hưng

No.	Name	Date of birth	Height	Weight	Spike	Block	Club
1	Huỳnh Trung Trực (L)	26 July 1990	1.76 m (5 ft 9 in)	70 kg (150 lb)	318 cm (125 in)	305 cm (120 in)	(Vietnam) Sanest Khánh Hòa
2	Nguyễn Xuân Thành (L)	14 July 1983	1.70 m (5 ft 7 in)	70 kg (150 lb)	310 cm (120 in)	300 cm (120 in)	(Vietnam) Tràng An Ninh Bình
3	Giang Văn Đức	26 December 1987	1.88 m (6 ft 2 in)	75 kg (165 lb)	335 cm (132 in)	325 cm (128 in)	(Vietnam) Tràng An Ninh Bình
6	Nguyễn Thanh Hải	2 September 1994	1.91 m (6 ft 3 in)	82 kg (181 lb)	335 cm (132 in)	320 cm (130 in)	(Vietnam) TP. Hồ Chí Minh
9	Phạm Thái Hưng (retired in 2019)	24 December 1990	1.98 m (6 ft 6 in)	80 kg (180 lb)	355 cm (140 in)	320 cm (130 in)	(Vietnam) Thể Công
10	Đinh Văn Tú	20 October 1993	1.83 m (6 ft 0 in)	82 kg (181 lb)	310 cm (120 in)	320 cm (130 in)	(Vietnam) TP. Hồ Chí Minh
11	Nguyễn Vũ Hoàng	12 May 1992	1.90 m (6 ft 3 in)	74 kg (163 lb)	330 cm (130 in)	325 cm (128 in)	(Vietnam) Thể Công
12	Lê Thành Hạc	21 August 1991	1.85 m (6 ft 1 in)	82 kg (181 lb)	330 cm (130 in)	320 cm (130 in)	(Vietnam) Trà Vinh
13	Nguyễn Thanh Tùng	3 February 1993	1.87 m (6 ft 2 in)	75 kg (165 lb)	330 cm (130 in)	327 cm (129 in)	(Vietnam) Tràng An Ninh Bình
14	Từ Thanh Thuận	15 July 1992	1.92 m (6 ft 4 in)	82 kg (181 lb)	352 cm (139 in)	330 cm (130 in)	(Vietnam) Sanest Khánh Hòa
15	Quản Trọng Nghĩa	25 March 1997	1.90 m (6 ft 3 in)	85 kg (187 lb)	340 cm (130 in)	330 cm (130 in)	(Vietnam) Cảnh Sát Cơ Động
17	Hoàng Văn Phương (C)	26 July 1989	1.90 m (6 ft 3 in)	85 kg (187 lb)	340 cm (130 in)	320 cm (130 in)	(Vietnam) Thể Công

Pool E

Pos	Team	Pld	W	L	Pts	SW	SL	SR	SPW	SPL	SPR	Qualification
1	Thailand	3	2	1	7	8	5	1.600	301	284	1.060	Classification for 1–12
2	China	3	2	1	6	8	6	1.333	313	301	1.040	Classification for 1–12
3	Sri Lanka	3	1	2	3	5	6	0.833	240	244	0.984	Classification for 13–20
4	Vietnam	3	1	2	2	4	8	0.500	260	285	0.912	Classification for 13–20

Source: OCA

Date	Time		Score		Set 1	Set 2	Set 3	Set 4	Set 5	Total	Report
20 Aug	10:00	China	2–3	Vietnam	23–25	24–26	25–19	25–22	19–21	116–113	Report
23 Aug	16:30	Vietnam	0–3	Sri Lanka	23–25	18–25	18–25			59–75	Report
24 Aug	19:00	Thailand	3–1	Vietnam	19–25	25–21	25–21	25–21		94–88	Report
26 Aug	12:30	Hong Kong	1–3	Vietnam	14–25	23–25	25–20	13–25		75–95	Report
30 Aug	19:00	Vietnam	3–0	Kyrgyzstan	25–16	26–24	29–27			80–67	Report
31 Aug	19:30	Sri Lanka	3–0	Vietnam	25–21	25–21	25–20			75–62	Report

==== Women's tournament ====
Team roster

The following is the Vietnamese roster in the women's volleyball tournament of the 2018 Asian Games.

Head coach: Nguyễn Tuấn Kiệt

No.	Name	Date of birth	Height	Weight	Spike	Block	Club
1	Dương Thị Hên	15 August 1998	1.74 m (5 ft 9 in)	56 kg (123 lb)	303 cm (119 in)	294 cm (116 in)	(Vietnam) VTV Bình Điền Long An
2	Đặng Thị Kim Thanh	28 March 1999	1.78 m (5 ft 10 in)	64 kg (141 lb)	300 cm (118 in)	295 cm (116 in)	(Vietnam) VTV Bình Điền Long An
3	Trần Thị Thanh Thúy	17 November 1997	1.93 m (6 ft 4 in)	67 kg (148 lb)	320 cm (126 in)	310 cm (122 in)	(Vietnam) VTV Bình Điền Long An
6	Đinh Thị Trà Giang (c)	26 June 1992	1.82 m (6 ft 0 in)	69 kg (152 lb)	305 cm (120 in)	297 cm (117 in)	(Vietnam) Kinh Bắc VC
8	Nguyễn Thị Kim Liên	10 February 1993	1.58 m (5 ft 2 in)	53 kg (117 lb)	270 cm (106 in)	265 cm (104 in)	(Vietnam) VTV Bình Điền Long An
10	Nguyễn Linh Chi	31 July 1990	1.73 m (5 ft 8 in)	65 kg (143 lb)	295 cm (116 in)	288 cm (113 in)	(Vietnam) Thông tin Liên Việt Post Bank
14	Đinh Thị Thúy	12 April 1998	1.75 m (5 ft 9 in)	64 kg (141 lb)	307 cm (121 in)	298 cm (117 in)	(Vietnam) Vietinbank VC
15	Nguyễn Thị Trinh	9 May 1997	1.81 m (5 ft 11 in)	61 kg (134 lb)	306 cm (120 in)	296 cm (117 in)	(Vietnam) Đắk Lắk VC
16	Bùi Thị Ngà	15 August 1994	1.87 m (6 ft 2 in)	74 kg (163 lb)	309 cm (122 in)	298 cm (117 in)	(Vietnam) Thông tin Liên Việt Post Bank
17	Lê Thanh Thúy	23 May 1995	1.80 m (5 ft 11 in)	62 kg (137 lb)	305 cm (120 in)	300 cm (118 in)	(Vietnam) Vietinbank VC
18	Lưu Thị Huệ	2 January 1999	1.85 m (6 ft 1 in)	58 kg (128 lb)	312 cm (123 in)	305 cm (120 in)	(Vietnam) Vietinbank VC
20	Nguyễn Thu Hoài	16 September 1998	1.74 m (5 ft 9 in)	58 kg (128 lb)	298 cm (117 in)	293 cm (115 in)	(Vietnam) Vietinbank VC

Pool B

Pos	Team	Pld	W	L	Pts	SW	SL	SR	SPW	SPL	SPR	Qualification
1	China	5	5	0	15	15	0	MAX	375	216	1.736	Quarterfinals
2	South Korea	5	4	1	12	12	4	3.000	382	299	1.278	Quarterfinals
3	Kazakhstan	5	2	3	7	9	10	0.900	386	406	0.951	Quarterfinals
4	Vietnam	5	2	3	6	8	11	0.727	369	406	0.909	Quarterfinals
5	Chinese Taipei	5	2	3	4	7	13	0.538	370	441	0.839	Classification for 9–11
6	India	5	0	5	1	2	15	0.133	292	406	0.719	Classification for 9–11

Source: OCA

Date	Time		Score		Set 1	Set 2	Set 3	Set 4	Set 5	Total	Report
19 Aug	10:00	China	3–0	Vietnam	25–11	25–15	25–13			75–39	Report
21 Aug	10:00	India	0–3	Vietnam	18–25	22–25	13–25			53–75	Report
23 Aug	12:30	Vietnam	2–3	Chinese Taipei	13–25	25–19	19–25	25–16	11–15	93–100	Report
25 Aug	12:30	Vietnam	0–3	South Korea	20–25	15–25	19–25			54–75	Report
27 Aug	16:30	Kazakhstan	2–3	Vietnam	25–20	25–19	27–29	19–25	7–15	103–108	Report
29 Aug	10:30	Thailand	3–0	Vietnam	25–23	25–16	25–20			75–59	Report
31 Aug	09:00	Vietnam	3–1	Indonesia	29–27	18–25	25–22	25–22		97–96	Report
01 Sep	12:30	Vietnam	1–3	Kazakhstan	18–25	25–22	22–25	24–26		89–98	Report

== Weightlifting ==
Men

Athlete	Event	Snatch		Clean & Jerk		Total	Rank
Athlete	Event	Result	Rank	Result	Rank	Total	Rank
Thạch Kim Tuấn	−56 kg	128	1	152	3	280	2nd place, silver medalist(s)
Trần Lê Quốc Toàn	−56 kg	123	3	148	4	271	4
Trịnh Văn Vinh	−62 kg	133	3	166	3	299	2nd place, silver medalist(s)
Đinh Xuân Hoang	−62 kg	129	8	159	5	288	6

Women

Athlete	Event	Snatch		Clean & Jerk		Total	Rank
Athlete	Event	Result	Rank	Result	Rank	Total	Rank
Vuong Thi Huyen	−48 kg	80	4	101	5	181	4
Nguyễn Thị Thúy	−48 kg	75	6	102	4	177	5

== Wrestling ==
Vietnam entered the competition with 9 wrestlers (4 men's and 5 women's). Until the end of the competition, the athletes closed the Games with winning one bronze medal. The best achievement reached by Nguyễn Thị Mỹ Hạnh after placing in the third position.

Key:

- F – Victory by fall.
- PP – Decision by points – the loser with technical points.
- PO – Decision by points – the loser without technical points.
- ST – Great superiority – the loser without technical points and a margin of victory of at least 8 (Greco-Roman) or 10 (freestyle) points.

Men's freestyle

Athlete	Event	Qualification	Round of 16	Quarterfinal	Semifinal	Repechage 1	Repechage 2	Final / BM	
Athlete	Event	Opposition Result	Opposition Result	Opposition Result	Opposition Result	Opposition Result	Opposition Result	Opposition Result	Rank
Nguyễn Xuân Định	−65 kg	Lee S-c (KOR); L 4–10	Did not advance						15
Cấn Tất Dự	−74 kg	Bye	C Aunjai (THA); W 6^{F}–0	Kaisanov (KAZ); L 0–10	Did not advance	Bye	A Ibrahim (QAT); L 10–6^{F}	Did not advance	9

Men's Greco-Roman

Athlete	Event	Round of 16	Quarterfinal	Semifinal	Repechage	Final / BM	
Athlete	Event	Opposition Result	Opposition Result	Opposition Result	Opposition Result	Opposition Result	Rank
Đới Đăng Tiến	−60 kg	Bye	M Ainagulov (KAZ); L 0–9	Did not advance			11
Nguyễn Bá Sơn	−77 kg	S Yabiku (JPN); L 0–9^{F}	Did not advance				15

Women's freestyle

Athlete	Event	Round of 16	Quarterfinal	Semifinal	Repechage	Final / BM	
Athlete	Event	Opposition Result	Opposition Result	Opposition Result	Opposition Result	Opposition Result	Rank
Nguyễn Thị Xuân	−50 kg	D Yakhshimuratova (UZB); L 2–12	Did not advance				8
Phạm Thị Hà Phương	−53 kg	D Ulfah (INA); W 5–3	E Sumiyaa (MGL); L 2–12	Did not advance			7
Kiều Thị Ly	−57 kg	Bye	A Battsetseg (MGL); L 1–13	Did not advance			9
Nguyễn Thị Mỹ Hạnh	−62 kg	Bye	P Orkhon (MGL); L 0–4^{F}	Did not advance	Bye	R Kawai (JPN); L 0–10	3rd place, bronze medalist(s)
Nguyễn Thị Vinh	−68 kg	Jang E-s (KOR); L 2–6	Did not advance				10

== Wushu ==
Taolu

Athlete	Event	Event 1		Event 2		Total	Rank
Athlete	Event	Result	Rank	Result	Rank	Total	Rank
Trần Xuân Hiệp	Men's changquan	DNS	—	—N/a		—	
Phạm Quốc Khánh	Men's nanquan and nangun	9.71	2	9.71	2	19.42	2nd place, silver medalist(s)
Cáo Khắc Đạt	Men's nanquan and nangun	9.59	8	9.70	5	19.29	6
Hoàng Thị Phương Giang	Women's changquan	9.71	3	—N/a		9.71	3rd place, bronze medalist(s)
Nguyễn Thùy Linh	Women's nanquan and nandao	9.45	6	9.48	8	18.93	10
Trần Thị Khánh Ly	Women's taijiquan and taijijian	9.68	3	9.66	5	19.34	4
Dương Thúy Vi	Women's jianshu and qiangshu	9.70	2	9.70	3	19.40	3rd place, bronze medalist(s)

Sanda

Athlete	Event	Round of 32	Round of 16	Quarterfinal	Semifinal	Final	
Athlete	Event	Opposition Score	Opposition Score	Opposition Score	Opposition Score	Opposition Score	Rank
Bùi Trường Giang	Men's –56 kg	S Ashimzhanov (KAZ); W 2–0	F Solis (PHI); W 2–0	K Soukaphone (LAO); W 2–0	S Kumar (IND); W 2–0	Shen GS (CHN); L 0–2	2nd place, silver medalist(s)
Nghiêm Văn Ý	Men's –60 kg	Bye	I Khaydarov (UZB); W 2–0	P Balawardhana (SRI); W 2–0	Wang XT (CHN); L 0–0 ^{TV}	Did not advance	3rd place, bronze medalist(s)
Hoàng Văn Cao	Men's –65 kg	—N/a	Bye	F Zafari (IRI); L 0–2	Did not advance		
Nguyễn Thị Thu Thủy	Women's –52 kg	—N/a	J Rai (NEP); W 2–0	E Mansourian (IRI); L 0–2	Did not advance		
Chu Thị Thúy Hằng	Women's –60 kg	—N/a	Lin Y-j (TPE); W 2–1	S Mansourian (IRI); L 0–0 ^{TV}	Did not advance		

Key: * TV – Technical victory.

== See also ==
- Vietnam at the 2018 Asian Para Games
