= Taekwondo at the 2018 Asian Games – Men's team poomsae =

Taekwondo competition

Men's team poomsae at the 2018 Asian Games
- Venue: Jakarta Convention Center
- Date: 19 August 2018
- Competitors: 33 from 11 nations

Medalists
gold medal	South Korea; Han Yeong-hun, Kim Seon-ho, Kang Wan-jin
silver medal	China; Zhu Yuxiang, Hu Mingda, Deng Tingfeng
bronze medal	Philippines; Dustin Mella, Jeordan Dominguez, Rodolfo Reyes
bronze medal	Vietnam; Nguyễn Thiên Phụng, Lê Thanh Trung, Trần Tiến Khoa

The freestyle & Recognized men's team poomsae event at the 2018 Asian Games took place on 19 August 2018 at Jakarta Convention Center Plenary Hall, Jakarta, Indonesia.

== Schedule ==
All times are Western Indonesia Time (UTC+07:00)

Date	Time	Event
Sunday, 19 August 2018	09:00	Round of 16
Sunday, 19 August 2018	09:00	Quarterfinals
Sunday, 19 August 2018	15:00	Semifinals
Sunday, 19 August 2018	15:00	Final

== Squads ==
China	Chinese Taipei	Indonesia	Iran
Zhu Yuxiang; Hu Mingda; Deng Tingfeng	Chang Wei-chieh; Ma Yun-zhong; Chen Po-kai	Abdul Rahman Darwin; Akhmad Syaiful Anwar; Maulana Haidir	Amir Reza Mehraban; Kourosh Bakhtiar; Ali Sohrabi
Kazakhstan	Philippines	Saudi Arabia	South Korea
Yerlan Nurkanov; Artem Chshelkov; Vyacheslav Chzhen	Dustin Mella; Jeordan Dominguez; Rodolfo Reyes	Wahid Moghis; Essa Al-Shaikh; Mohammed Al-Mustafa	Han Yeong-hun; Kim Seon-ho; Kang Wan-jin
Thailand	Uzbekistan	Vietnam	
Pongporn Suvittayarak; Chaiyasit Kwanboon; Nay Khamwongsa	Mavlonjon Rustamov; Jonibek Normamatov; Doniyorbek Akhmadjonov	Nguyễn Thiên Phụng; Lê Thanh Trung; Trần Tiến Khoa	

== Results ==
Legend

- WO — Won by walkover

Round of 16
Philippines	8.18
Saudi Arabia	7.64
Indonesia	8.30
Kazakhstan	7.63
Uzbekistan
Chinese Taipei	WO

Quarterfinals
Iran	8.10
Philippines	8.33
Thailand	8.36
China	8.48
South Korea	8.68
Indonesia	8.39
Chinese Taipei	8.26
Vietnam	8.39

Semifinals
Philippines	7.83
China	8.18
South Korea	8.42
Vietnam	8.32

Final
China	8.02
South Korea	8.48
