= Wushu at the 2018 Asian Games – Men's nanquan & nangun =

Men's nanquan & nangun at the 2018 Asian Games
- Venue: Jakarta International Expo
- Dates: 20–21 August 2018
- Competitors: 23 from 18 nations

Medalists
gold medal	Huang Junhua	Macau
silver medal	Phạm Quốc Khánh	Vietnam
bronze medal	Lee Yong-mun	South Korea

The men's Nanquan / Nangun all-round competition at the 2018 Asian Games in Jakarta, Indonesia was held from 20 August to 21 August at the JIExpo Kemayoran Hall B3.

== Schedule ==
All times are Western Indonesia Time (UTC+07:00)

Date	Time	Event
Monday, 20 August 2018	09:00	Nanquan
Tuesday, 21 August 2018	09:00	Nangun

== Results ==
Rank	Athlete	Nanquan	Nangun	Total
1st place, gold medalist(s)	Huang Junhua (MAC)	9.70	9.73	19.43
2nd place, silver medalist(s)	Phạm Quốc Khánh (VIE)	9.71	9.71	19.42
3rd place, bronze medalist(s)	Lee Yong-mun (KOR)	9.69	9.71	19.40
4	Lai Po-wei (TPE)	9.69	9.70	19.39
5	Ryouta Mouri (JPN)	9.68	9.69	19.37
6	Cao Khắc Đạt (VIE)	9.59	9.70	19.29
7	Calvin Lee (MAS)	9.59	9.70	19.29
8	Leung Cheuk Hei (HKG)	9.56	9.68	19.24
9	Harris Horatius (INA)	9.50	9.71	19.21
10	Thornton Sayan (PHI)	9.52	9.67	19.19
11	Li Jingde (CHN)	9.75	9.39	19.14
12	Mohammad Adi Salihin (BRU)	9.55	9.58	19.13
13	Pitaya Yangrungrawin (THA)	9.42	9.66	19.08
14	Yun Dong-hae (KOR)	9.48	9.44	18.92
15	Sufi Shayiran Roslan (BRU)	9.14	9.58	18.72
16	Thein Than Oo (MYA)	9.68	9.00	18.68
17	Sajan Lama (IND)	8.94	9.67	18.61
18	Gali Dauletzhan (KAZ)	9.02	9.10	18.12
19	Punshiva Meitei (IND)	9.05	8.95	18.00
20	Bancha Saetho (THA)	8.34	9.13	17.47
21	Yubaraj Thapa (NEP)	8.22	9.20	17.42
22	Jamshid Ebram (AFG)	7.87	7.78	15.65
23	Muhammad Dawood (PAK)	6.65	6.37	13.02
