= Pencak silat at the 2018 Asian Games – Men's tanding 75 kg =

Men's tanding 75 kg at the 2018 Asian Games
- Venue: Padepokan Pencak Silat
- Dates: 23–29 August 2018
- Competitors: 10 from 10 nations

Medalists
gold medal	Trần Đình Nam	Vietnam
silver medal	Fauzi Khalid	Malaysia
bronze medal	Daniiar Tokurov	Kyrgyzstan
bronze medal	Amri Rusdana	Indonesia

The men's tanding 75 kilograms competition at the 2018 Asian Games took place from 23 to 29 August 2018 at Padepokan Pencak Silat, Taman Mini Indonesia Indah, Jakarta, Indonesia.

Pencak silat is traditional Indonesian martial arts. Pencak silat is assessed from a punch, kick, sweep, and dings. The target that must be addressed is the patron in the body of every fighter who competed. Each judge gives an individual score for each competitor. The score given to each boxer would be taken from all 5 judges.

A total of ten competitors from ten different countries competed in this Class F event, limited to fighters whose body weight was less than 75 kilograms.

Trần Đình Nam from Vietnam won the gold medal after defeating Fauzi Khalid from Malaysia in the gold medal match by the score of 3–2. Daniiar Tokurov from Kyrgyzstan and Amri Rusdana from Indonesia finished third and won the bronze medal after losing in the semifinal.

== Schedule ==
All times are Western Indonesia Time (UTC+07:00)

Date	Time	Event
Thursday, 23 August 2018	14:30	Round of 16
Friday, 24 August 2018	14:30	Quarterfinals
Sunday, 26 August 2018	09:00	Semifinals
Wednesday, 29 August 2018	14:30	Final

== Results ==
Round of 16
Nur Alfian Juma'en (SGP)	0
Kuibrohem Kubaha (THA)	5
Nurulla Saidov (UZB)	0
Amri Rusdana (INA)	5

Quarterfinals
Trần Đình Nam (VIE)	5
Kuibrohem Kubaha (THA)	0
Daniiar Tokurov (KGZ)	5
Rana Ali Raza (PAK)	0
Fauzi Khalid (MAS)	5
Johnny Vongphakdy (LAO)	0
Mohsen Ranjdoust (IRI)	0
Amri Rusdana (INA)	5

Semifinals
Trần Đình Nam (VIE)	5
Daniiar Tokurov (KGZ)	0
Fauzi Khalid (MAS)	3
Amri Rusdana (INA)	2

Final
Trần Đình Nam (VIE)	5
Fauzi Khalid (MAS)	0
