= Pencak silat at the 2018 Asian Games – Women's tanding 60 kg =

Women's tanding 60 kg at the 2018 Asian Games
- Venue: Padepokan Pencak Silat
- Dates: 23–27 August 2018
- Competitors: 9 from 9 nations

Medalists
| gold medal | Sarah Tria Monita | Indonesia |
| silver medal | Nong Oy Vongphakdy | Laos |
| bronze medal | Siti Khadijah Shahrem | Singapore |
| bronze medal | Hoàng Thị Loan | Vietnam |

The women's tanding 60 kilograms competition at the 2018 Asian Games took place from 23 to 27 August 2018 at Padepokan Pencak Silat, Taman Mini Indonesia Indah, Jakarta, Indonesia.

Pencak silat is traditional Indonesian martial arts. Pencak silat is assessed from a punch, kick, sweep, and dings. The target that must be addressed is the patron in the body of every fighter who competed. Each judge gives an individual score for each competitor. The score given to each boxer would be taken from all 5 judges.

A total of nine competitors from nine countries competed in this Class C event, limited to fighters whose body weight was less than 60 kilograms.

Sarah Tria Monita from Indonesia won the gold medal after defeating Nong Oy Vongphakdy from Laos in the gold medal match by the score of 5–0. Siti Khadijah Shahrem from Singapore and Hoàng Thị Loan from Vietnam finished third and won the bronze medal after losing in the semifinal.

== Schedule ==
All times are Western Indonesia Time (UTC+07:00)

| Date | Time | Event |
|---|---|---|
| Thursday, 23 August 2018 | 15:30 | Round of 16 |
| Friday, 24 August 2018 | 16:30 | Quarterfinals |
| Saturday, 25 August 2018 | 14:00 | Quarterfinals |
| Sunday, 26 August 2018 | 15:30 | Semifinals |
| Monday, 27 August 2018 | 16:00 | Final |

== Results ==
Round of 16
Siti Shazwana Ajak (MAS) | 5
Nazanin Mirmohammadtabar (IRI) | 0

Quarterfinals
Nong Oy Vongphakdy (LAO) | 5
Tolgonai Kalnazarova (KGZ) | 0
Paphawinee Kueakoboon (THA) | 2
Siti Khadijah Shahrem (SGP) | 3
Hoàng Thị Loan (VIE) | 5
Precious Jade Borre (PHI) | 0
Sarah Tria Monita (INA) | 5
Siti Shazwana Ajak (MAS) | 0

Semifinals
Nong Oy Vongphakdy (LAO) | 3
Siti Khadijah Shahrem (SGP) | 2
Hoàng Thị Loan (VIE) | 0
Sarah Tria Monita (INA) | 5

Final
Nong Oy Vongphakdy (LAO) | 0
Sarah Tria Monita (INA) | 5
