= Pencak silat at the 2018 Asian Games – Women's regu =

Women's regu at the 2018 Asian Games
- Venue: Padepokan Pencak Silat
- Dates: 29 August 2018
- Competitors: 21 from 7 nations

Medalists
gold medal	Indonesia; Pramudita Yuristya, Lutfi Nurhasanah, Gina Tri Lestari
silver medal	Vietnam; Nguyễn Thị Thu Hà, Nguyễn Thị Huyền, Vương Thị Bình
bronze medal	Thailand; Asma Jehma, Yuweeta Samahoh, Ruhana Chearbuli

The women's regu (team) seni competition at the 2018 Asian Games took place on 29 August 2018 at Padepokan Pencak Silat, Taman Mini Indonesia Indah, Jakarta, Indonesia.

== Schedule ==
All times are Western Indonesia Time (UTC+07:00)

Date	Time	Event
Wednesday, 29 August 2018	11:00	Final

== Results ==
Rank	Team	Score
1st place, gold medalist(s)	Indonesia (INA); Pramudita Yuristya; Lutfi Nurhasanah; Gina Tri Lestari	466
2nd place, silver medalist(s)	Vietnam (VIE); Nguyễn Thị Thu Hà; Nguyễn Thị Huyền; Vương Thị Bình	464
3rd place, bronze medalist(s)	Thailand (THA); Asma Jehma; Yuweeta Samahoh; Ruhana Chearbuli	448
4	Singapore (SGP); Nurzuhairah Yazid; Nurul Syafiqah Faizul; Siti Nazurah Yusoff	447
5	Brunei (BRU); Anisah Najihah; Qistina Athirah Zainal; Nur Azimatunnaemah Simat	447
6	Malaysia (MAS); Nuraisyah Shamshul Bahrin; Norshahirah Ratius; Siti Nur Khairunnisa Hail	443
7	Laos (LAO); Tunee Vilaysack; Motlaya Vongphakdy; Aphinyo Douangmany	442
