= Pencak silat at the 2018 Asian Games – Women's tanding 65 kg =

Women's tanding 65 kg at the 2018 Asian Games
- Venue: Padepokan Pencak Silat
- Dates: 23–29 August 2018
- Competitors: 7 from 7 nations

Medalists
gold medal	Pipiet Kamelia	Indonesia
silver medal	Nguyễn Thị Cẩm Nhi	Vietnam
bronze medal	Janejira Wankrue	Thailand
bronze medal	Tahmineh Karbalaei	Iran

The women's tanding 65 kg kilograms competition at the 2018 Asian Games took place from 23 to 29 August 2018 at Padepokan Pencak Silat, Taman Mini Indonesia Indah, Jakarta, Indonesia.

== Schedule ==
All times are Western Indonesia Time (UTC+07:00)

Date	Time	Event
Thursday, 23 August 2018	17:00	Quarterfinals
Friday, 24 August 2018	10:00	Quarterfinals
Sunday, 26 August 2018	15:00	Semifinals
Wednesday, 29 August 2018	15:30	Final

== Results ==
Legend

- WO — Won by walkover

Quarterfinals
Nurul Suhaila (SGP)	0
Pipiet Kamelia (INA)	5
Siti Rahmah Nasir (MAS)	0
Nguyễn Thị Cẩm Nhi (VIE)	5
Alina Kamalova (KGZ)
Tahmineh Karbalaei (IRI)	WO

Semifinals
Janejira Wankrue (THA)	0
Pipiet Kamelia (INA)	5
Nguyễn Thị Cẩm Nhi (VIE)	5
Tahmineh Karbalaei (IRI)	0

Final
Pipiet Kamelia (INA)	5
Nguyễn Thị Cẩm Nhi (VIE)	0
