= Vũ Thị Mến =

Vietnamese triple jumper

Vũ Thị Mến (born 10 July 1990 in Nam Định) is a Vietnamese triple jumper.

She won the bronze medal at the 2018 Asian Games.

Her personal best jump is 14.15 metres, achieved at the 2017 Southeast Asian Games in Kuala Lumpur.
