= Pencak silat at the 2018 Asian Games – Men's regu =

Men's regu at the 2018 Asian Games
- Venue: Padepokan Pencak Silat
- Dates: 27 August 2018
- Competitors: 21 from 7 nations

Medalists
gold medal	Indonesia; Nunu Nugraha, Asep Yuldan Sani, Anggi Faisal Mubarok
silver medal	Vietnam; Vũ Tiến Dũng, Nguyễn Xuân Thành, Lưu Văn Nam
bronze medal	Thailand; Fadil Dama, Masofee Wani, Islamee Wani

The men's regu (team) seni competition at the 2018 Asian Games took place on 27 August 2018 at Padepokan Pencak Silat, Taman Mini Indonesia Indah, Jakarta, Indonesia.

== Schedule ==
All times are Western Indonesia Time (UTC+07:00)

Date	Time	Event
Monday, 27 August 2018	11:00	Final

== Results ==
Rank	Team	Score
1st place, gold medalist(s)	Indonesia (INA); Nunu Nugraha; Asep Yuldan Sani; Anggi Faisal Mubarok	465
2nd place, silver medalist(s)	Vietnam (VIE); Vũ Tiến Dũng; Nguyễn Xuân Thành; Lưu Văn Nam	450
3rd place, bronze medalist(s)	Thailand (THA); Fadil Dama; Masofee Wani; Islamee Wani	448
4	Malaysia (MAS); Syafiq Ibrahim; Sazzlan Yuga; Juned Abdullah	446
5	Singapore (SGP); Nujaid Hasif; Hamillatu Arash Juffrie; Nazrul Kamal	444
6	Philippines (PHI); Alfau Jan Abad; Al-Mohaidib Abad; James El Mayagma	436
7	Laos (LAO); Piyaphong Champavannalath; Vanxay Bounnavong; Thanongsak Phanthavong	426
