= Pencak silat at the 2018 Asian Games – Men's ganda =

Men's ganda at the 2018 Asian Games
- Venue: Padepokan Pencak Silat
- Dates: 27 August 2018
- Competitors: 14 from 7 nations

Medalists
gold medal	Yolla Primadona Jampil; Hendy	Indonesia
silver medal	Trần Đức Danh; Lê Hồng Quân	Vietnam
bronze medal	Taqiyuddin Hamid; Afifi Nordin	Malaysia

The men's Ganda (double) seni competition at the 2018 Asian Games took place on 27 August 2018 at Padepokan Pencak Silat, Taman Mini Indonesia Indah, Jakarta, Indonesia.

== Schedule ==
All times are Western Indonesia Time (UTC+07:00)

Date	Time	Event
Monday, 27 August 2018	10:00	Final

== Results ==
Rank	Team	Score
1st place, gold medalist(s)	Indonesia (INA); Yolla Primadona Jampil; Hendy	580
2nd place, silver medalist(s)	Vietnam (VIE); Trần Đức Danh; Lê Hồng Quân	562
3rd place, bronze medalist(s)	Malaysia (MAS); Taqiyuddin Hamid; Afifi Nordin	560
4	Thailand (THA); Adisak Jehna; Beela Nawae	560
5	Singapore (SGP); Shakir Juanda; Hamillatu Arash Juffrie	550
6	Philippines (PHI); Alfau Jan Abad; Al-Mohaidib Abad	545
7	Laos (LAO); Alisack Singsouvong; Amphonh Khounchaleun	543
