= Pencak silat at the 2018 Asian Games – Women's ganda =

Women's ganda at the 2018 Asian Games
- Venue: Padepokan Pencak Silat
- Dates: 29 August 2018
- Competitors: 14 from 7 nations

Medalists
| gold medal | Ayu Sidan Wilantari; Ni Made Dwiyanti | Indonesia |
| silver medal | Saowanee Chanthamunee; Oraya Choosuwan | Thailand |
| bronze medal | Nor Hamizah Abu Hassan; Nur Syazreen Abdul Malik | Malaysia |

The women's Ganda (double) seni competition at the 2018 Asian Games took place on 29 August 2018 at Padepokan Pencak Silat, Taman Mini Indonesia Indah, Jakarta, Indonesia.

== Schedule ==
All times are Western Indonesia Time (UTC+07:00)

| Date | Time | Event |
|---|---|---|
| Wednesday, 29 August 2018 | 10:00 | Final |

== Results ==
| Rank | Team | Score |
|---|---|---|
| 1st place, gold medalist(s) | Indonesia (INA); Ayu Sidan Wilantari; Ni Made Dwiyanti | 574 |
| 2nd place, silver medalist(s) | Thailand (THA); Saowanee Chanthamunee; Oraya Choosuwan | 564 |
| 3rd place, bronze medalist(s) | Malaysia (MAS); Nor Hamizah Abu Hassan; Nur Syazreen Abdul Malik | 558 |
| 4 | Singapore (SGP); Nur Azlyana Ismail; Nurhanishah Shahrudin | 549 |
| 5 | Laos (LAO); Motlaya Vongphakdy; Aphinyo Douangmany | 545 |
| 6 | Vietnam (VIE); Nguyễn Thị Thu Hà; Nguyễn Thị Huyền | 544 |
| 7 | India (IND); Simran; Sonia | 527 |
