= Pencak silat at the 2018 Asian Games – Women's tanding 55 kg =

Women's tanding 55 kg at the 2018 Asian Games
- Venue: Padepokan Pencak Silat
- Dates: 23–29 August 2018
- Competitors: 9 from 9 nations

Medalists
gold medal	Wewey Wita	Indonesia
silver medal	Trần Thị Thêm	Vietnam
bronze medal	Nurul Shafiqah Saiful	Singapore
bronze medal	Olathay Sounthavong	Laos

The women's tanding 55 kilograms competition at the 2018 Asian Games took place from 23 to 29 August 2018 at Padepokan Pencak Silat, Taman Mini Indonesia Indah, Jakarta, Indonesia.

Pencak silat is traditional Indonesian martial arts. Pencak silat is assessed from a punch, kick, sweep, and dings. The target that must be addressed is the patron in the body of every fighter who competed. Each judge gives an individual score for each competitor. The score given to each boxer would be taken from all 5 judges.

A total of nine competitors from nine different countries competed in this Class B event, limited to fighters whose body weight was less than 55 kilograms.

Wewey Wita from Indonesia won the gold medal after defeating Trần Thị Thêm from Vietnam in the gold medal match by the score of 5–0. Nurul Shafiqah Saiful from Singapore and Olathay Sounthavong from Laos finished third and won the bronze medal after losing in the semifinal.

== Schedule ==
All times are Western Indonesia Time (UTC+07:00)

Date	Time	Event
Thursday, 23 August 2018	15:00	Round of 16
Friday, 24 August 2018	15:30	Quarterfinals
Sunday, 26 August 2018	11:00	Semifinals
Wednesday, 29 August 2018	16:30	Final

== Results ==
Round of 16
Suda Lueangaphichatkun (THA)	5
Mihrinsa Niiazova (KGZ)	0

Quarterfinals
Nurul Shafiqah Saiful (SGP)	5
Zahra Foroughinasab (IRI)	0
Munisa Rabbimova (UZB)	0
Trần Thị Thêm (VIE)	5
Princesslyn Enopia (PHI)	0
Olathay Sounthavong (LAO)	5
Wewey Wita (INA)	5
Suda Lueangaphichatkun (THA)	0

Semifinals
Nurul Shafiqah Saiful (SGP)	1
Trần Thị Thêm (VIE)	4
Olathay Sounthavong (LAO)	0
Wewey Wita (INA)	5

Final
Trần Thị Thêm (VIE)	0
Wewey Wita (INA)	5
