= Pencak silat at the 2018 Asian Games – Men's tanding 95 kg =

Men's tanding 95 kg at the 2018 Asian Games
- Venue: Padepokan Pencak Silat
- Dates: 23–29 August 2018
- Competitors: 9 from 9 nations

Medalists
gold medal	Nguyễn Văn Trí	Vietnam
silver medal	Khaizul Yaacob	Malaysia
bronze medal	Sheik Farhan Alau'ddin	Singapore
bronze medal	Tachin Pokjay	Thailand

The men's tanding 95 kg kilograms competition at the 2018 Asian Games took place from 23 to 29 August 2018 at Padepokan Pencak Silat, Taman Mini Indonesia Indah, Jakarta, Indonesia.

Pencak silat is traditional Indonesian martial arts. Pencak silat is assessed from a punch, kick, sweep, and dings. The target that must be addressed is the patron in the body of every fighter who competed. Each judge gives an individual score for each competitor. The score given to each boxer would be taken from all 5 judges.

A total of nine competitors from nine countries competed in this Class J event, limited to fighters whose body weight was less than 95 kilograms.

Nguyễn Văn Trí of Vietnam won the gold medal.

== Schedule ==
All times are Western Indonesia Time (UTC+07:00)

Date	Time	Event
Thursday, 23 August 2018	16:00	Round of 16
Saturday, 25 August 2018	15:00	Quarterfinals
Sunday, 26 August 2018	14:00	Semifinals
Wednesday, 29 August 2018	14:00	Final

== Results ==
Legend

- DQ — Won by disqualification

Round of 16
Khusankhon Baratov (UZB)	0
Mohammad Mortazi (IRI)	5

Quarterfinals
Rashit Amankulov (KGZ)	0
Nguyễn Văn Trí (VIE)	5
Eko Febrianto (INA)
Sheik Farhan Alau'ddin (SGP)	DQ
Tachin Pokjay (THA)	5
Muhammad Zubair Arshad (PAK)	0
Khaizul Yaacob (MAS)	5
Mohammad Mortazi (IRI)	0

Semifinals
Nguyễn Văn Trí (VIE)	5
Sheik Farhan Alau'ddin (SGP)	0
Tachin Pokjay (THA)	0
Khaizul Yaacob (MAS)	5

Final
Nguyễn Văn Trí (VIE)	5
Khaizul Yaacob (MAS)	0
