= Pencak silat at the 2018 Asian Games – Men's tunggal =

Men's tunggal at the 2018 Asian Games
- Venue: Padepokan Pencak Silat
- Dates: 25–29 August 2018
- Competitors: 10 from 10 nations

Medalists
gold medal	Sugianto	Indonesia
silver medal	Ilyas Sadara	Thailand
bronze medal	Al-Mohaidib Abad	Philippines

The men's tunggal (single) seni competition at the 2018 Asian Games took place from 25 to 29 August 2018 at Padepokan Pencak Silat, Taman Mini Indonesia Indah, Jakarta, Indonesia.

== Schedule ==
All times are Western Indonesia Time (UTC+07:00)

Date	Time	Event
Saturday, 25 August 2018	09:30	Preliminary
Wednesday, 29 August 2018	09:00	Final

== Results ==
Legend

- DSQ — Disqualified

=== Preliminary ===
==== Group A ====
Rank	Athlete	Score
1	Ilyas Sadara (THA)	460
2	Vũ Tiến Dũng (VIE)	452
3	Souksavanh Chanthilath (LAO)	452
4	Afifi Nordin (MAS)	450
5	Daisuke Aso (JPN)	442

==== Group B ====
Rank	Athlete	Score
1	Sugianto (INA)	467
2	Iqbal Abdul Rahman (SGP)	458
3	Al-Mohaidib Abad (PHI)	452
4	Noman Yousaf (PAK)	412
—	Paulo Futre Dos Reis (TLS)	DSQ

=== Final ===
Rank	Athlete	Score
1st place, gold medalist(s)	Sugianto (INA)	471
2nd place, silver medalist(s)	Ilyas Sadara (THA)	460
3rd place, bronze medalist(s)	Al-Mohaidib Abad (PHI)	455
4	Vũ Tiến Dũng (VIE)	435
5	Iqbal Abdul Rahman (SGP)	432
6	Souksavanh Chanthilath (LAO)	429
