= Pencak silat at the 2018 Asian Games – Men's tanding 65 kg =

Men's tanding 65 kg at the 2018 Asian Games
- Venue: Padepokan Pencak Silat
- Dates: 23–27 August 2018
- Competitors: 12 from 12 nations

Medalists
gold medal	Iqbal Candra Pratama	Indonesia
silver medal	Nguyễn Ngọc Toàn	Vietnam
bronze medal	Jeff Loon	Philippines
bronze medal	Abdumalik Salimov	Uzbekistan

The men's tanding 65 kilograms competition at the 2018 Asian Games took place from 23 to 27 August 2018 at Padepokan Pencak Silat, Taman Mini Indonesia Indah, Jakarta, Indonesia.

Pencak silat is traditional Indonesian martial arts. Pencak silat is assessed from a punch, kick, sweep, and dings. The target that must be addressed is the patron in the body of every fighter who competed. Each judge gives an individual score for each competitor. The score given to each boxer would be taken from all 5 judges.

A total of twelve competitors from twelve countries competed in this Class D event, limited to fighters whose body weight was less than 65 kilograms.

Iqbal Candra Pratama from Indonesia won the gold medal after defeating Nguyễn Ngọc Toàn from Vietnam in the gold medal match by the score of 3–2. Jeff Loon from the Philippines and Abdumalik Salimov from Uzbekistan finished third and won the bronze medal after losing in the semifinal.

== Schedule ==
All times are Western Indonesia Time (UTC+07:00)

Date	Time	Event
Thursday, 23 August 2018	10:30	Round of 16
Friday, 24 August 2018	09:00	Quarterfinals
Sunday, 26 August 2018	10:00	Semifinals
Monday, 27 August 2018	15:30	Final

== Results ==
Round of 16
Raaziq Rashid (SGP)	1
Mino Vongphakdy (LAO)	4
Mateus Conceção (TLS)	0
Jeff Loon (PHI)	5
Mohammad Rahimi (IRI)	5
B. K. Vivek Kumar (NEP)	0
Pornteb Poolkaew (THA)	0
Iqbal Candra Pratama (INA)	5

Quarterfinals
Nguyễn Ngọc Toàn (VIE)	5
Mino Vongphakdy (LAO)	0
Almazbek Zamirov (KGZ)	0
Jeff Loon (PHI)	4
Abdumalik Salimov (UZB)	3
Mohammad Rahimi (IRI)	0
Zarish Hakim (MAS)	0
Iqbal Candra Pratama (INA)	5

Semifinals
Nguyễn Ngọc Toàn (VIE)	5
Jeff Loon (PHI)	0
Abdumalik Salimov (UZB)	0
Iqbal Candra Pratama (INA)	5

Final
Nguyễn Ngọc Toàn (VIE)	1
Iqbal Candra Pratama (INA)	4
