= Pencak silat at the 2018 Asian Games – Men's tanding 90 kg =

Men's tanding 90 kg at the 2018 Asian Games
- Venue: Padepokan Pencak Silat
- Dates: 23–27 August 2018
- Competitors: 7 from 7 nations

Medalists
gold medal	Aji Bangkit Pamungkas	Indonesia
silver medal	Sheik Ferdous Alau'ddin	Singapore
bronze medal	Nguyễn Duy Tuyến	Vietnam
bronze medal	Robial Sobri	Malaysia

The men's tanding 90 kilograms competition at the 2018 Asian Games took place from 23 to 27 August 2018 at Padepokan Pencak Silat, Taman Mini Indonesia Indah, Jakarta, Indonesia.

== Schedule ==
All times are Western Indonesia Time (UTC+07:00)

Date	Time	Event
Thursday, 23 August 2018	16:00	Quarterfinals
Sunday, 26 August 2018	14:30	Semifinals
Monday, 27 August 2018	14:00	Final

== Results ==
Quarterfinals		Semifinals		Final
		Aji Bangkit Pamungkas (INA)	5
Savatvilay Phimmasone (LAO)	0	Nguyễn Duy Tuyến (VIE)	0
Nguyễn Duy Tuyến (VIE)	5			Aji Bangkit Pamungkas (INA)	5
Sheik Ferdous Alau'ddin (SGP)	5			Sheik Ferdous Alau'ddin (SGP)	0
Babak Hashemzadeh (IRI)	0	Sheik Ferdous Alau'ddin (SGP)	5
Pimpirat Tonkhieo (THA)	1	Robial Sobri (MAS)	0
Robial Sobri (MAS)	4
