= Pencak silat at the 2018 Asian Games – Men's tanding 70 kg =

Men's tanding 70 kg at the 2018 Asian Games
- Venue: Padepokan Pencak Silat
- Dates: 23–27 August 2018
- Competitors: 11 from 11 nations

Medalists
gold medal	Komang Harik Adi Putra	Indonesia
silver medal	Al-Jufferi Jamari	Malaysia
bronze medal	Phạm Tuấn Anh	Vietnam
bronze medal	Zholdoshbek Akimkanov	Kyrgyzstan

The men's tanding 70 kilograms competition at the 2018 Asian Games took place from 23 to 27 August 2018 at Padepokan Pencak Silat, Taman Mini Indonesia Indah, Jakarta, Indonesia.

Pencak silat is traditional Indonesian martial arts. Pencak silat is assessed from a punch, kick, sweep, and dings. The target that must be addressed is the patron in the body of every fighter who competed. Each judge gives an individual score for each competitor. The score given to each boxer would be taken from all 5 judges.

A total of eleven competitors from eleven different countries competed in this Class E event, limited to fighters whose body weight was less than 70 kilograms.

== Schedule ==
All times are Western Indonesia Time (UTC+07:00)

Date	Time	Event
Thursday, 23 August 2018	11:30	Round of 16
Friday, 24 August 2018	10:00	Quarterfinals
Sunday, 26 August 2018	09:30	Semifinals
Monday, 27 August 2018	14:30	Final

== Results ==
Legend

- WO — Won by walkover

Round of 16
Komang Harik Adi Putra (INA)	5
David Ximenes (TLS)	0
Okhe Botsavang (LAO)	0
Phạm Tuấn Anh (VIE)	5
Alvin Campos (PHI)	0
Al-Jufferi Jamari (MAS)	5

Quarterfinals
Shakir Juanda (SGP)	0
Komang Harik Adi Putra (INA)	5
Wutthichai Phuttan (THA)	0
Phạm Tuấn Anh (VIE)	5
Zholdoshbek Akimkanov (KGZ)	5
Umer Farooq (PAK)	0
Akbar Kianian (IRI)	0
Al-Jufferi Jamari (MAS)	5

Semifinals
Komang Harik Adi Putra (INA)	5
Phạm Tuấn Anh (VIE)	0
Zholdoshbek Akimkanov (KGZ)
Al-Jufferi Jamari (MAS)	WO

Final
Komang Harik Adi Putra (INA)	4
Al-Jufferi Jamari (MAS)	1
