= Hanifan Yudani Kusumah =

Indonesian pencak silat practitioner (born 1997)

- Born: 25 October 1997 (age 29); Bandung, West Java, Indonesia
- Height: 165 cm (5 ft 5 in)
- Style: Pencak silat

Hanifan Yudani Kusumah (born 25 October 1997) is an Indonesian pencak silat practitioner. He won a gold medal in the 2018 Asian Games, after previously winning a bronze medal in the 2017 SEA Games.

== Biography ==
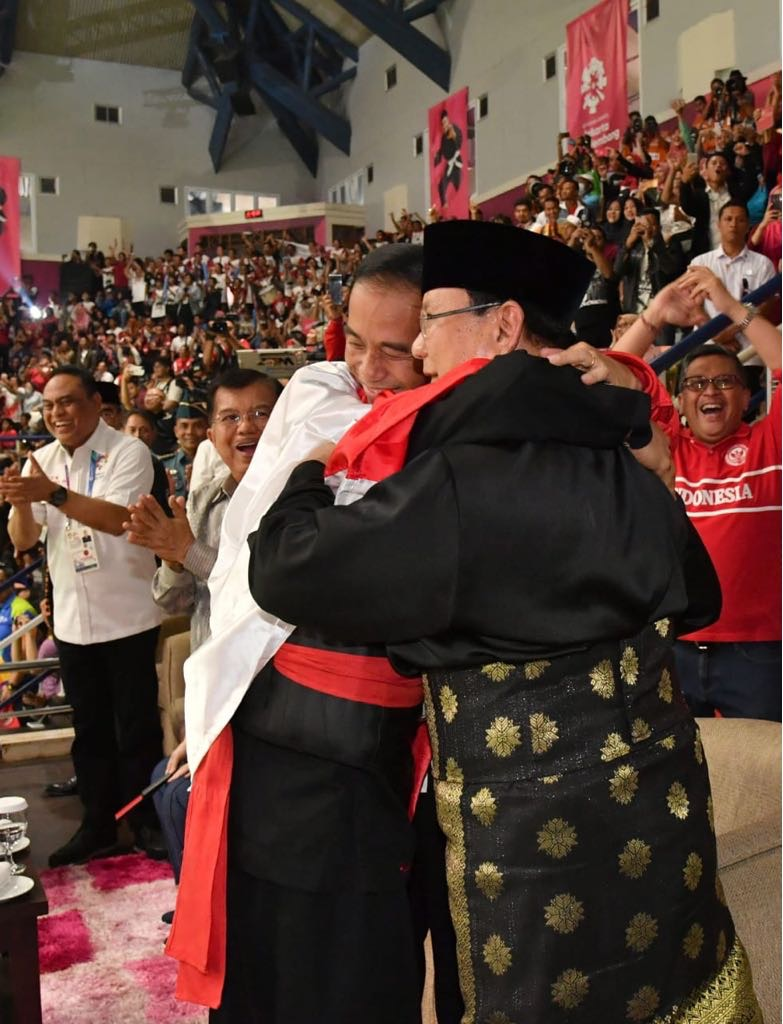
Hanifan hugging Joko Widodo and Prabowo Subianto.

Hanifan was born in Bandung, West Java on 25 October 1997. His father Dani Wisnu, who was also a silat practitioner and was part of the national-level selection in 2005, had begun training him in pencak silat when he was in second grade of elementary school. Hanifan's mother Dewi Yanti Kosasih was also a silat practitioner who had participated in international competitions. Later on, Hanifan joined a silat academy, named "Perguruan Silat Tadjimalela".

He first participated in competitions in 2010, when he won a silver medal in a local competition between Tadjimalela students. During the Pekan Olahraga Nasional event on 2016, Hanifan won a gold medal. Later that year, Hanifan won a silat world championship in Denpasar.

In 2017, Hanifan also won a gold medal in the Belgium Open 2017 tournament. Later that year, during the 2017 SEA Games, Hanifan won a bronze medal. He then won a silver medal in the 2019 SEA Games.

=== Asian Games ===
Hanifan was part of the Indonesian contingent in the 2018 Asian Games, where he was in the C (55–60 kg) weight class. On August 29, he defeated Vietnamese athlete Nguyễn Thái Linh 3–2 to win gold, the 29th for the contingent and the 13th for Indonesia from the sport.

After receiving the gold medal, Hanifan headed to the VIP section where President of Indonesia Joko Widodo and Prabowo Subianto, as the head of Indonesia's Pencak Silat Association, were present. Following a normal handshake with vice president Jusuf Kalla, Hanifan embraced both Widodo and Prabowo in a hug while draped by the Indonesian flag, eliciting cheers from the audience. Widodo and Prabowo were set to compete in the 2019 presidential election, and the hug was seen as a symbol of unity. An image of the occasion later posted to Widodo's Instagram account was liked over 1 million times, and the image also became a trending topic on Twitter.

He was Indonesia's flagbearer during the games' closing ceremony. Shortly after the Asian Games, Hanifan married fellow Indonesian pencak silat athlete Pipiet Kamelia, with Sports and Youth Minister Imam Nahrawi as witness.

== Awards and nominations ==
Award	Year	Category	Result	Ref.
Golden Award SIWO PWI	2019	Best Male Athlete	Nominated	
Golden Award SIWO PWI	2019	Favorite Male Athlete	Won	
Indonesian Sport Awards	2018	Favorite Male Athlete	Nominated	

== Achievements ==
International Games / Tournaments
Year	Venue	Event	Result	Games / Tournaments
2016	Denpasar, Indonesia	Men's tanding Class C (55–60 kg)	(gold) Gold	17th World Pencak Silat Championships
2017	Antwerp, Belgium	Men's tanding Class C (55–60 kg)	(gold) Gold	Belgium Open
2017	Kuala Lumpur, Malaysia	Men's tanding Class C (55–60 kg)	(bronze) Bronze	SEA Games
2018	Antwerp, Belgium	Men's tanding Class C (55–60 kg)	(gold) Gold	Belgium Open
2018	Jakarta, Indonesia	Men's tanding Class C (55–60 kg)	(gold) Gold	Asian Games
2019	Antwerp, Belgium	Men's tanding Class D (60–65 kg)	(bronze) Bronze	Belgium Open
2019	Subic Bay, Philippines	Men's tanding Class D (60–65 kg)	(silver) Silver	SEA Games
2022	Melaka, Malaysia	Men's tanding Class D (60–65 kg)	(silver) Silver	19th World Pencak Silat Championships
