= Sepak takraw at the 2018 Asian Games =

- Venue: Ranau Sports Hall
- Dates: 19 August – 1 September 2018
- Competitors: 253 from 15 nations

Sepak takraw at the 2018 Asian Games was held at Ranau Sports Hall, Palembang, Indonesia. It was held from 19 August to 1 September.

== Schedule ==
P	Preliminary round	½	Semifinals	F	Final

Event↓/Date →	19th Sun	20th Mon	21st Tue	22nd Wed		23rd Thu	24th Fri		25th Sat	26th Sun	27th Mon		28th Tue	29th Wed	30th Thu	31st Fri		1st Sat
Men's regu									P	P	P	½	F					
Men's quadrant													P	P	P	P	½	F
Men's team doubles						P	P	½	F									
Men's team regu	P	P	½	F														
Women's quadrant													P	P	P	½		F
Women's team regu	P	P	P	½	F													

== Medalists ==
=== Men ===
Event	Gold	Silver	Bronze
Regu	Malaysia; Azlan Alias; Zulkifli Abd Razak; Norhaffizi Abd Razak; Farhan Adam; Syahir Rosdi	Indonesia; Mohamad Herson Saipul; Muhammad Hardiansyah Muliang; Nofrizal; Abdul Halim Radjiu; Victoria Eka Prasetyo	South Korea; Lim Tae-gyun; Lee Jun-ho; Kim Young-man; Shim Jae-chul; Jeong Won-deok
Regu	Malaysia; Azlan Alias; Zulkifli Abd Razak; Norhaffizi Abd Razak; Farhan Adam; Syahir Rosdi	Indonesia; Mohamad Herson Saipul; Muhammad Hardiansyah Muliang; Nofrizal; Abdul Halim Radjiu; Victoria Eka Prasetyo	Singapore; Afif Safiee; Farhan Aman; Mohd Asri Aron; Asfandi Ja'al; Farhan Amran
Quadrant	Indonesia; Muhammad Hardiansyah Muliang; Nofrizal; Saiful Rijal; Husni Uba; Rizky Abdul Rahman Pago; Abdul Halim Radjiu	Japan; Yuki Sato; Seiya Takano; Takeshi Terashima; Toshitaka Naito; Hirokazu Kobayashi; Masanori Hayashi	Singapore; Mohd Al-Haj Kasmanani; Afif Safiee; Farhan Aman; Khairilshamy Shamsudin; Mohd Asri Aron; Farhan Amran
Quadrant	Indonesia; Muhammad Hardiansyah Muliang; Nofrizal; Saiful Rijal; Husni Uba; Rizky Abdul Rahman Pago; Abdul Halim Radjiu	Japan; Yuki Sato; Seiya Takano; Takeshi Terashima; Toshitaka Naito; Hirokazu Kobayashi; Masanori Hayashi	Vietnam; Đỗ Mạnh Tuấn; Nguyễn Quốc Anh; Nguyễn Hoàng Lân; Nguyễn Hữu Danh; Đầu Văn Hoàng; Lê Văn Nghĩa
Team doubles	Thailand; Anuwat Chaichana; Seksan Tubtong; Pornchai Kaokaew; Wichan Temkort; Pattarapong Yupadee; Assadin Wongyota; Rachan Viphan; Jirasak Pakbuangoen; Suriyon Koonpimon	Laos; Yothin Sombatphouthone; Chanthalak Chanthavong; Xaibandith Thadanabouth; Noum Souvannalith; Phitthasanh Bounpaseuth; Kantana Nanthisen; Laksanaxay Bounphaivanh; Kongsy Yang; Phonsavanh Keoviseth	Indonesia; Mohamad Herson Saipul; Muhammad Hardiansyah Muliang; Rezki Yusuf Djaina; Nofrizal; Saiful Rijal; Husni Uba; Hendra Pago; Rizky Abdul Rahman Pago; Abdul Halim Radjiu
Team doubles	Thailand; Anuwat Chaichana; Seksan Tubtong; Pornchai Kaokaew; Wichan Temkort; Pattarapong Yupadee; Assadin Wongyota; Rachan Viphan; Jirasak Pakbuangoen; Suriyon Koonpimon	Laos; Yothin Sombatphouthone; Chanthalak Chanthavong; Xaibandith Thadanabouth; Noum Souvannalith; Phitthasanh Bounpaseuth; Kantana Nanthisen; Laksanaxay Bounphaivanh; Kongsy Yang; Phonsavanh Keoviseth	Japan; Yuki Sato; Seiya Takano; Takeshi Terashima; Toshitaka Naito; Ryo Masuda; Tsubasa Sato; Masahiro Yamada; Hirokazu Kobayashi; Masanori Hayashi
Team regu	Thailand; Anuwat Chaichana; Siriwat Sakha; Thawisak Thongsai; Pornchai Kaokaew; Pattarapong Yupadee; Assadin Wongyota; Thanawat Chumsena; Rachan Viphan; Sittipong Khamchan; Jirasak Pakbuangoen; Kritsanapong Nontakote; Jantarit Khukaeo	Malaysia; Said Ezwan Said De; Noraizat Mohd Nordin; Syazreenqamar Salehan; Azlan Alias; Afifuddin Razali; Kamal Ishak; Zulkifli Abd Razak; Norhaffizi Abd Razak; Farhan Adam; Hairul Hazizi Haidzir; Aidil Aiman Azwawi; Syahir Rosdi	India; Niken Singh Khangembam; Sanjeck Singh Waikhom; Dheeraj Kumar; Jotin Singh Ngathem; Lalit Kumar; Sandeep Kumar; Seitaram Singh Thokchom; Harish Kumar; Malemnganba Sorokhaibam; Gurumayum Jiteshor Sharma; Henary Singh Wahengbam; Akash Yumnam
Team regu	Thailand; Anuwat Chaichana; Siriwat Sakha; Thawisak Thongsai; Pornchai Kaokaew; Pattarapong Yupadee; Assadin Wongyota; Thanawat Chumsena; Rachan Viphan; Sittipong Khamchan; Jirasak Pakbuangoen; Kritsanapong Nontakote; Jantarit Khukaeo	Malaysia; Said Ezwan Said De; Noraizat Mohd Nordin; Syazreenqamar Salehan; Azlan Alias; Afifuddin Razali; Kamal Ishak; Zulkifli Abd Razak; Norhaffizi Abd Razak; Farhan Adam; Hairul Hazizi Haidzir; Aidil Aiman Azwawi; Syahir Rosdi	Indonesia; Mohamad Herson Saipul; Syamsul Akmal; Muhammad Hardiansyah Muliang; Rezki Yusuf Djaina; Andi Try Sandi Saputra; Nofrizal; Saiful Rijal; Husni Uba; Hendra Pago; Rizky Abdul Rahman Pago; Abdul Halim Radjiu; Victoria Eka Prasetyo

=== Women ===
Event	Gold	Silver	Bronze
Quadrant	Thailand; Masaya Duangsri; Sasiwimol Janthasit; Fueangfa Praphatsarang; Somruedee Pruepruk; Payom Srihongsa; Wiphada Chitphuan	Vietnam; Nguyễn Thị Quyên; Giáp Thị Hiền; Dương Thị Xuyên; Hoàng Thị Hoà; Nguyễn Thị Phương Trinh; Nguyễn Thị My	Indonesia; Leni; Dini Mita Sari; Florensia Cristy; Lena; Akyko Micheel Kapito; Kusnelia
Quadrant	Thailand; Masaya Duangsri; Sasiwimol Janthasit; Fueangfa Praphatsarang; Somruedee Pruepruk; Payom Srihongsa; Wiphada Chitphuan	Vietnam; Nguyễn Thị Quyên; Giáp Thị Hiền; Dương Thị Xuyên; Hoàng Thị Hoà; Nguyễn Thị Phương Trinh; Nguyễn Thị My	Laos; Koy Xayavong; Norkham Vongxay; Sonsavan Keosouliya; Santisouk Chandala; Chiep Banxavang; Nouandam Volabouth
Team regu	Thailand; Masaya Duangsri; Suputtra Beartong; Thitima Mahakusol; Kaewjai Pumsawangkaew; Sasiwimol Janthasit; Thidarat Soda; Fueangfa Praphatsarang; Nisa Thanaattawut; Nipaporn Salupphon; Somruedee Pruepruk; Payom Srihongsa; Wiphada Chitphuan	South Korea; Kim Dong-hee; Kim I-seul; Bae Han-oul; Jeon Gyu-mi; Kim Ji-eun; Lee Min-ju; Choi Ji-na; Yu Seong-hee; Kim Ji-young; Kim Hee-jin; Park Seon-ju; Jung Ju-seung	Myanmar; Kyu Kyu Thin; Khin Hnin Wai; Aye Aye Than; Nant Yin Yin Myint; Phyu Phyu Than; Su Mon Kyaw; Lairo Eng; Su Mon Aung; Nan Su Myat San; Ya Mong Zin; Nyein Chan Thu; Su Yee Htet
Team regu	Thailand; Masaya Duangsri; Suputtra Beartong; Thitima Mahakusol; Kaewjai Pumsawangkaew; Sasiwimol Janthasit; Thidarat Soda; Fueangfa Praphatsarang; Nisa Thanaattawut; Nipaporn Salupphon; Somruedee Pruepruk; Payom Srihongsa; Wiphada Chitphuan	South Korea; Kim Dong-hee; Kim I-seul; Bae Han-oul; Jeon Gyu-mi; Kim Ji-eun; Lee Min-ju; Choi Ji-na; Yu Seong-hee; Kim Ji-young; Kim Hee-jin; Park Seon-ju; Jung Ju-seung	Vietnam; Nguyễn Thị Quyên; Giáp Thị Hiền; Nguyễn Thị Thu Hạnh; Dương Thị Xuyên; Đặng Thị Phương Thanh; Hoàng Thị Hoà; Bùi Thị Hải Yến; Phạm Thị Hằng; Nguyễn Thị Phương Trinh; Trần Thị Thu Hoài; Nguyễn Thị My; Đặng Thị Mỹ Linh

== Medal table ==
Rank	Nation	Gold	Silver	Bronze	Total
1	Thailand (THA)	4	0	0	4
2	Indonesia (INA)	1	1	3	5
3	Malaysia (MAS)	1	1	0	2
4	Vietnam (VIE)	0	1	2	3
5	Japan (JPN)	0	1	1	2
5	Laos (LAO)	0	1	1	2
5	South Korea (KOR)	0	1	1	2
8	Singapore (SGP)	0	0	2	2
9	India (IND)	0	0	1	1
9	Myanmar (MYA)	0	0	1	1
Totals (10 entries)		6	6	12	24

== Participating nations ==
A total of 253 athletes from 15 nations competed in sepak takraw at the 2018 Asian Games:

- China (6)
- India (24)
- Indonesia (24)
- Iran (12)
- Japan (18)
- Laos (22)
- Malaysia (24)
- Myanmar (23)
- Nepal (5)
- Pakistan (6)
- Philippines (10)
- Singapore (7)
- South Korea (27)
- Thailand (27)
- Vietnam (18)
