= Pencak silat at the 2018 Asian Games – Men's tanding 55 kg =

Men's tanding 55 kg at the 2018 Asian Games
- Venue: Padepokan Pencak Silat
- Dates: 23–27 August 2018
- Competitors: 10 from 10 nations

Medalists
gold medal	Abdul Malik	Indonesia
silver medal	Faizul Nasir	Malaysia
bronze medal	Dines Dumaan	Philippines
bronze medal	Bo Thammavongsa	Laos

The men's tanding class B (55 kilograms) competition at the 2018 Asian Games took place from 23 to 27 August 2018 at Padepokan Pencak Silat, Taman Mini Indonesia Indah, Jakarta, Indonesia.

Pencak silat is traditional Indonesian martial arts. Pencak silat is assessed from a punch, kick, sweep, and dings. The target that must be addressed is the patron in the body of every fighter who competed. Each judge gives an individual score for each competitor. The score given to each boxer would be taken from all 5 judges.

A total of ten competitors from ten different countries competed in this Class B event, limited to fighters whose body weight was less than 55 kilograms.

Abdul Malik from Indonesia won the gold medal after defeating Faizul Nasir from Malaysia in the gold medal match by the score of 5–0. Dines Dumaan from the Philippines and Bo Thammavongsa from Laos finished third and won the bronze medal after losing in the semifinal.

== Schedule ==
All times are Western Indonesia Time (UTC+07:00)

Date	Time	Event
Thursday, 23 August 2018	14:00	Round of 16
Friday, 24 August 2018	11:00	Quarterfinals
Sunday, 26 August 2018	10:30	Semifinals
Monday, 27 August 2018	16:30	Final

== Results ==
Round of 16
Naorem Boynao Singh (IND)	5
Turatbek Sulaimankul Uulu (KGZ)	0
Abdul Malik (INA)	3
Nguyễn Đình Tuấn (VIE)	1

Quarterfinals
Dines Dumaan (PHI)	5
Naorem Boynao Singh (IND)	0
Faizul Nasir (MAS)	5
Adnan (PAK)	0
Joaquim Afonso Gomes (TLS)	0
Bo Thammavongsa (LAO)	5
Sobri Cheni (THA)	0
Abdul Malik (INA)	5

Semifinals
Dines Dumaan (PHI)	0
Faizul Nasir (MAS)	5
Bo Thammavongsa (LAO)	0
Abdul Malik (INA)	5

Final
Faizul Nasir (MAS)	0
Abdul Malik (INA)	5
