= Soft tennis at the 2018 Asian Games – Women's singles =

Women's singles at the 2018 Asian Games
- Venue: Jakabaring Tennis Courts
- Dates: 28–29 August 2018
- Competitors: 27 from 14 nations

Medalists
gold medal	Noa Takahashi	Japan
silver medal	Cheng Chu-ling	Chinese Taipei
bronze medal	Yu Yuanyi	China
bronze medal	Dwi Rahayu Pitri	Indonesia

The women's singles soft tennis event was part of the soft tennis programme and took place between August 28 and 29, at the Jakabaring Sport City Tennis Court.

== Schedule ==
All times are Western Indonesia Time (UTC+07:00)

Date	Time	Event
Tuesday, 28 September 2018	09:00	Preliminary round
Wednesday, 29 September 2018	09:00	Quarterfinals
Wednesday, 29 September 2018	10:00	Semifinals
Wednesday, 29 September 2018	12:00	Final

== Results ==
=== Preliminary round ===
==== Group A ====
Pos	Athlete	Pld	W	L	GF	GA	GD	Qualification
1	Kim Mi-hyang (PRK)	2	2	0	8	3	+5	Quarterfinals
2	Bien Zoleta-Mañalac (PHI)	2	1	1	7	4	+3	
3	Syeda Eraj Batool Zaidi (PAK)	2	0	2	0	8	−8	

Source: OCA

	Score		Game						
	Score		1	2	3	4	5	6	7
Bien Zoleta-Mañalac (PHI)	4–0	Syeda Eraj Batool Zaidi (PAK)	4–1	4–1	4–0	4–0			
Syeda Eraj Batool Zaidi (PAK)	0–4	Kim Mi-hyang (PRK)	2–4	1–4	0–4	0–4			
Bien Zoleta-Mañalac (PHI)	3–4	Kim Mi-hyang (PRK)	5–3	1–4	5–3	2–4	2–4	5–3	1–7

==== Group B ====
Pos	Athlete	Pld	W	L	GF	GA	GD	Qualification
1	Yu Yuanyi (CHN)	3	3	0	12	2	+10	Quarterfinals
2	Bulgany Norovsüren (MGL)	3	2	1	8	6	+2	
3	Abhilasha Mehra (IND)	3	1	2	8	9	−1	
4	Aliya Maniphone (LAO)	3	0	3	1	12	−11	

Source: OCA

	Score		Game						
	Score		1	2	3	4	5	6	7
Yu Yuanyi (CHN)	4–0	Bulgany Norovsüren (MGL)	4–1	4–1	5–3	4–0			
Aliya Maniphone (LAO)	1–4	Abhilasha Mehra (IND)	3–5	6–8	4–2	0–4	0–4		
Yu Yuanyi (CHN)	4–0	Aliya Maniphone (LAO)	4–0	4–1	4–0	4–0			
Bulgany Norovsüren (MGL)	4–2	Abhilasha Mehra (IND)	3–5	4–0	4–1	4–2	5–7	7–5	
Yu Yuanyi (CHN)	4–2	Abhilasha Mehra (IND)	4–1	2–4	4–0	2–4	4–0	6–4	
Bulgany Norovsüren (MGL)	4–0	Aliya Maniphone (LAO)	4–2	4–0	4–1	4–2			

==== Group C ====
Pos	Athlete	Pld	W	L	GF	GA	GD	Qualification
1	Noa Takahashi (JPN)	2	2	0	8	0	+8	Quarterfinals
2	Lee Ching-wen (TPE)	2	1	1	4	5	−1	
3	Sunatcha Kraiya (THA)	2	0	2	1	8	−7	

Source: OCA

	Score		Game						
	Score		1	2	3	4	5	6	7
Noa Takahashi (JPN)	4–0	Sunatcha Kraiya (THA)	4–2	4–0	4–0	4–0			
Sunatcha Kraiya (THA)	1–4	Lee Ching-wen (TPE)	2–4	2–4	2–4	4–2	2–4		
Noa Takahashi (JPN)	4–0	Lee Ching-wen (TPE)	4–1	4–2	4–1	4–2			

==== Group D ====
Pos	Athlete	Pld	W	L	GF	GA	GD	Qualification
1	Kim Ji-yeon (KOR)	2	2	0	8	3	+5	Quarterfinals
2	Dede Tari Kusrini (INA)	2	1	1	7	5	+2	
3	Rin Sotheary (CAM)	2	0	2	1	8	−7	

Source: OCA

	Score		Game						
	Score		1	2	3	4	5	6	7
Kim Ji-yeon (KOR)	4–0	Rin Sotheary (CAM)	4–0	4–2	4–1	4–1			
Rin Sotheary (CAM)	1–4	Dede Tari Kusrini (INA)	1–4	4–2	1–4	2–4	2–4		
Kim Ji-yeon (KOR)	4–3	Dede Tari Kusrini (INA)	4–0	2–4	4–0	1–4	2–4	4–0	7–3

==== Group E ====
Pos	Athlete	Pld	W	L	GF	GA	GD	Qualification
1	Kurumi Onoue (JPN)	2	2	0	8	2	+6	Quarterfinals
2	Kim Young-hai (KOR)	2	1	1	6	4	+2	
3	Phonesamai Champamanivong (LAO)	2	0	2	0	8	−8	

Source: OCA

	Score		Game						
	Score		1	2	3	4	5	6	7
Kurumi Onoue (JPN)	4–0	Phonesamai Champamanivong (LAO)	4–0	4–1	4–0	4–0			
Phonesamai Champamanivong (LAO)	0–4	Kim Young-hai (KOR)	1–4	0–4	2–4	1–4			
Kurumi Onoue (JPN)	4–2	Kim Young-hai (KOR)	4–1	4–1	4–0	1–4	1–4	4–2	

==== Group F ====
Pos	Athlete	Pld	W	L	GF	GA	GD	Qualification
1	Cheng Chu-ling (TPE)	3	3	0	12	1	+11	Quarterfinals
2	Hong Ji-sun (PRK)	3	2	1	9	4	+5	
3	Wang Yufei (CHN)	3	1	2	4	8	−4	
4	Trần Thanh Hoàng Ngân (VIE)	3	0	3	0	12	−12	

Source: OCA

	Score		Game						
	Score		1	2	3	4	5	6	7
Cheng Chu-ling (TPE)	4–1	Hong Ji-sun (PRK)	4–0	6–4	4–1	2–4	6–4		
Trần Thanh Hoàng Ngân (VIE)	0–4	Wang Yufei (CHN)	0–4	1–4	0–4	1–4			
Cheng Chu-ling (TPE)	4–0	Trần Thanh Hoàng Ngân (VIE)	4–0	4–0	4–0	4–0			
Hong Ji-sun (PRK)	4–0	Wang Yufei (CHN)	4–2	5–3	4–2	4–2			
Cheng Chu-ling (TPE)	4–0	Wang Yufei (CHN)	4–1	4–1	4–1	4–0			
Hong Ji-sun (PRK)	4–0	Trần Thanh Hoàng Ngân (VIE)	4–1	4–0	4–1	4–1			

==== Group G ====
Pos	Athlete	Pld	W	L	GF	GA	GD	Qualification
1	Dares Srirungreang (THA)	3	3	0	12	2	+10	Quarterfinals
2	Princess Catindig (PHI)	3	2	1	10	4	+6	
3	Bataagiin Chinmörön (MGL)	3	1	2	4	8	−4	
4	Varisha Khan (PAK)	3	0	3	0	12	−12	

Source: OCA

	Score		Game						
	Score		1	2	3	4	5	6	7
Bataagiin Chinmörön (MGL)	4–0	Varisha Khan (PAK)	4–0	4–0	4–0	4–0			
Princess Catindig (PHI)	2–4	Dares Srirungreang (THA)	0–4	1–4	4–1	0–4	4–1	2–4	
Bataagiin Chinmörön (MGL)	0–4	Princess Catindig (PHI)	0–4	2–4	2–4	1–4			
Varisha Khan (PAK)	0–4	Dares Srirungreang (THA)	1–4	0–4	1–4	2–4			
Bataagiin Chinmörön (MGL)	0–4	Dares Srirungreang (THA)	2–4	0–4	2–4	2–4			
Varisha Khan (PAK)	0–4	Princess Catindig (PHI)	0–4	0–4	2–4	3–5			

==== Group H ====
Pos	Athlete	Pld	W	L	GF	GA	GD	Qualification
1	Dwi Rahayu Pitri (INA)	2	2	0	8	0	+8	Quarterfinals
2	Meth Mariyan (CAM)	2	1	1	4	7	−3	
3	Namita Seth (IND)	2	0	2	3	8	−5	

Source: OCA

	Score		Game						
	Score		1	2	3	4	5	6	7
Dwi Rahayu Pitri (INA)	4–0	Namita Seth (IND)	4–0	4–0	5–3	4–2			
Namita Seth (IND)	3–4	Meth Mariyan (CAM)	3–5	4–1	4–2	4–0	5–7	7–9	5–7
Dwi Rahayu Pitri (INA)	4–0	Meth Mariyan (CAM)	4–2	4–2	4–1	4–2			

=== Knockout round ===
Quarterfinals
A1	Kim Mi-hyang (PRK)	0	4	4	0	6	2	2
B1	Yu Yuanyi (CHN)	4	1	0	4	4	4	7
C1	Noa Takahashi (JPN)	4	1	2	3	5	5	7
D1	Kim Ji-yeon (KOR)	1	4	4	5	3	3	2
E1	Kurumi Onoue (JPN)	5	2	2	2
F1	Cheng Chu-ling (TPE)	7	4	4	4
G1	Dares Srirungreang (THA)	4	2	1	0	4	4	4
H1	Dwi Rahayu Pitri (INA)	2	4	4	4	1	1	7

Semifinals
B1	Yu Yuanyi (CHN)	2	1	0	1
C1	Noa Takahashi (JPN)	4	4	4	4
F1	Cheng Chu-ling (TPE)	3	4	2	4	4	4
H1	Dwi Rahayu Pitri (INA)	5	2	4	1	1	1

Final
C1	Noa Takahashi (JPN)	0	4	4	3	4	6	7
F1	Cheng Chu-ling (TPE)	4	2	1	5	1	8	2
