= Archery at the 2018 Asian Games – Men's team compound =

Men's team compound at the 2018 Asian Games
- Venue: Gelora Bung Karno Archery Field
- Dates: 22–28 August 2018
- Competitors: 57 from 16 nations

Medalists
gold medal	South Korea; Choi Yong-hee, Hong Sung-ho, Kim Jong-ho
silver medal	India; Rajat Chauhan, Aman Saini, Abhishek Verma
bronze medal	Malaysia; Alang Arif Aqil, Lee Kin Lip, Juwaidi Mazuki

The men's team compound archery competition at the 2018 Asian Games was held from 22 to 28 August at Gelora Bung Karno Archery Field.

A total of 16 teams participated in the ranking round to determine the seeds for knockout round. Each team consisted of the highest ranked three athletes from the qualification round.

== Schedule ==
All times are Western Indonesia Time (UTC+07:00)

Date	Time	Event
Wednesday, 22 August 2018	14:20	Ranking round
Sunday, 26 August 2018	10:50	1/8 eliminations
Sunday, 26 August 2018	14:55	Quarterfinals
Sunday, 26 August 2018	16:35	Semifinals
Tuesday, 28 August 2018	13:10	Bronze medal match
Tuesday, 28 August 2018	13:35	Gold medal match

== Results ==
=== Ranking round ===
Rank	Team	Half		Total	10s	Xs
Rank	Team	1st	2nd	Total	10s	Xs
1	South Korea (KOR)	1055	1061	2116	174	73
	Choi Yong-hee	354	355	709	61	28
	Hong Sung-ho	351	356	707	60	19
	Kim Jong-ho	~~348~~	~~350~~	~~698~~	~~51~~	~~30~~
	Kim Tae-yoon	350	350	700	53	26
2	India (IND)	1040	1047	2087	144	63
	Sangampreet Singh Bisla	~~342~~	~~347~~	~~689~~	~~45~~	~~15~~
	Rajat Chauhan	344	347	691	44	20
	Aman Saini	343	349	692	44	21
	Abhishek Verma	353	351	704	56	22
3	Chinese Taipei (TPE)	1043	1041	2084	146	70
	Chen Hsiang-hsuan	~~337~~	~~343~~	~~680~~	~~36~~	~~16~~
	Lin Che-wei	349	347	696	49	21
	Lin Hsin-min	344	344	688	43	20
	Pan Yu-ping	350	350	700	54	29
4	Iran (IRI)	1034	1041	2075	136	56
	Esmaeil Ebadi	344	345	689	43	18
	Majid Gheidi	~~343~~	~~342~~	~~685~~	~~38~~	~~8~~
	Amir Kazempour	340	349	689	43	17
	Nima Mahboubi	350	347	697	50	21
5	Malaysia (MAS)	1036	1036	2072	138	47
	Alang Arif Aqil	342	338	680	39	13
	Lee Kin Lip	346	341	687	42	16
	Juwaidi Mazuki	348	357	705	57	18
	Zulfadhli Ruslan	~~336~~	~~338~~	~~674~~	~~34~~	~~11~~
6	Kazakhstan (KAZ)	1038	1031	2069	132	40
	Pavel Fisher	345	343	688	42	13
	Akbarali Karabayev	349	349	698	51	16
	Sergey Khristich	344	339	683	39	11
	Konstantin Solodovnikov	~~337~~	~~336~~	~~673~~	~~33~~	~~12~~
7	Philippines (PHI)	1028	1035	2063	131	55
	Paul Dela Cruz	351	341	692	45	19
	Joseph Vicencio	342	352	694	47	21
	Earl Yap	335	342	677	39	15
8	Indonesia (INA)	1029	1033	2062	130	51
	Yoke Rizaldi Akbar	348	346	694	47	19
	Indra Prasetyo	~~337~~	~~325~~	~~662~~	~~29~~	~~12~~
	Muhammad Rindarto	339	341	680	38	18
	Prima Wisnu Wardhana	342	346	688	45	14
9	Bangladesh (BAN)	1016	1025	2041	110	34
	Jabed Alam	334	339	673	32	7
	Ashim Kumer Das	347	345	692	44	15
	Abul Kashem Mamun	335	341	676	34	12
10	Vietnam (VIE)	1021	1019	2040	114	45
	Mai Xuân Đức	335	339	674	30	13
	Nguyễn Thanh Tuấn	340	339	679	41	11
	Nguyễn Tiến Cương	346	341	687	43	21
11	Thailand (THA)	1014	1020	2034	114	47
	Nitiphum Chatachot	344	336	680	40	13
	Dhansarit Itsarangkun	344	348	692	46	23
	Khwanchai Phohiran	~~334~~	~~324~~	~~658~~	~~27~~	~~8~~
	Chanchai Pratheepwatanawong	326	336	662	28	11
12	Laos (LAO)	1009	1023	2032	112	36
	Lot Outtaliyung	332	339	671	36	9
	Daliya Saidara	334	343	677	35	12
	Khamvarn Vanlivong	343	341	684	41	15
13	Bhutan (BHU)	1009	1019	2028	110	46
	Tandin Dorji	342	342	684	40	16
	Tashi Peljor	344	340	684	39	19
	Phuntsho Wangdi	323	337	660	31	11
14	Singapore (SGP)	1002	1025	2027	113	38
	Ang Han Teng	334	342	676	42	14
	Goh Jun Hui	~~329~~	~~344~~	~~673~~	~~33~~	~~8~~
	Alan Lee	335	343	678	36	12
	Pang Toh Jin	333	340	673	35	12
15	Qatar (QAT)	991	986	1977	84	28
	Ahmed Al-Abadi	332	326	658	29	11
	Israf Khan	333	334	667	31	11
	Farhan Monser	326	326	652	24	6
16	Mongolia (MGL)	943	947	1890	66	31
	Lkhamsürengiin Aldar	330	330	660	26	15
	Dugarjavyn Enkhtüvshin	318	296	614	20	5
	Ganzorigiin Shandan	295	321	616	20	11

- South Korea replaced Kim Tae-yoon with Kim Jong-ho for the knockout round.
- Iran replaced Amir Kazempour with Majid Gheidi for the knockout round.

=== Knockout round ===
1/8 eliminations
1	South Korea	233
16	Mongolia	205
9	Bangladesh	228
8	Indonesia	230
5	Malaysia	230
12	Laos	223
13	Bhutan	217
4	Iran	231
3	Chinese Taipei	230
14	Singapore	224
11	Thailand	222
6	Kazakhstan	227
7	Philippines	227
10	Vietnam	218
15	Qatar	213
2	India	227

Quarterfinals
1	South Korea	231
8	Indonesia	220
5	Malaysia	232
4	Iran	224
3	Chinese Taipei	232
6	Kazakhstan	227
7	Philippines	226
2	India	227

Semifinals
1	South Korea	235
5	Malaysia	229
3	Chinese Taipei	227
2	India	230

Gold medal match
1	South Korea	229^{29*}
2	India	229^{29}
Bronze medal match
5	Malaysia	225
3	Chinese Taipei	223
