= Laos at the 2018 Asian Games =

- IOC code: LAO
- NOC: National Olympic Committee of Lao

in Jakarta and Palembang August 18 – September 2
- Medals Ranked 31st: Gold 0 Silver 2 Bronze 3 Total 5

Asian Games appearances (overview)
- 1974; 1978; 1982; 1986; 1990; 1994; 1998; 2002; 2006; 2010; 2014; 2018; 2022; 2026

Laos participated in the 2018 Asian Games in Jakarta and Palembang, Indonesia from 18 August to 2 September 2018. Laos first competed at the Asian Games in 1974 Tehran, and the best achievement was in the last edition of 2014 Incheon, when the country gained a silver, and 2 bronze medals.

== Medal summary ==
=== Medals by sport ===
Medals by sport
Sport	1st place, gold medalist(s)	2nd place, silver medalist(s)	3rd place, bronze medalist(s)	Total
Pencak silat	0	1	2	3
Sepak takraw	0	1	1	2
Total	0	2	3	5

=== Medals by day ===
Medals by day
Day	Date	1st place, gold medalist(s)	2nd place, silver medalist(s)	3rd place, bronze medalist(s)	Total
1	August 19	0	0	0	0
2	August 20	0	0	0	0
3	August 21	0	0	0	0
4	August 22	0	0	0	0
5	August 23	0	0	0	0
6	August 24	0	0	0	0
7	August 25	0	1	0	1
8	August 26	0	0	2	2
9	August 27	0	1	0	1
10	August 28	0	0	0	0
11	August 29	0	0	0	0
12	August 30	0	0	0	0
13	August 31	0	0	0	0
14	September 1	0	0	1	1
15	September 2	0	0	0	0
Total		0	2	3	5

=== Medalists ===
The following Laos competitors won medals at the Games.

Medal	Name	Sport	Event	Date
Silver	Yothin Sombatputhone; Chanthalak Chanthavong; Xaibandith Thadanabouth; Noum Souvannalith; Phitthasanh Bounpaseuth; Kantana Nanthisen; Laksanaxay Bounphaivanh; Kongsy Yang; Phonsavanh Keoviseth	Sepaktakraw	Men's team doubles	25 August
Silver	Nong Oy Vongphakdy	Pencak silat	Women's tanding 60 kg	27 August
Bronze	Bo Thammavongsa	Pencak silat	Men's tanding 55 kg	26 August
Bronze	Olathay Sounthavong	Pencak silat	Women's tanding 55 kg	26 August
Bronze	Koy Xayavong; Norkham Vongxay; Sonsavan Keosouliya; Santisouk Chandala; Chiep Banxavang; Nouandam Volabouth	Sepaktakraw	Women's quadrant	1 September

== Competitors ==
The following is a list of the number of competitors representing Laos that participated at the Games:

Sport	Men	Women	Total
Archery	4	2	6
Athletics	2	2	4
Baseball	15	—	15
Boxing	3	1	4
Cycling	2	0	2
Football	20	0	20
Judo	3	3	6
Karate	3	1	4
Paragliding	5	0	5
Pencak silat	12	5	17
Sepak takraw	11	11	22
Shooting	1	2	3
Soft tennis	5	2	7
Swimming	1	2	3
Table tennis	4	2	6
Taekwondo	5	2	7
Weightlifting	1	1	2
Wushu	4	2	6
Total	101	38	139

Demonstration events

Sport	Men	Women	Total
eSports	6	0	6

== Archery ==
Recurve

Athlete	Event	Ranking round		Round of 64	Round of 32	Round of 16	Quarterfinals	Semifinals	Final / BM	
Athlete	Event	Score	Seed	Opposition Score	Opposition Score	Opposition Score	Opposition Score	Opposition Score	Opposition Score	Rank
Soulivong Onmanee	Men's individual	592	42	Rezowan (BAN); L 0–6	Did not advance					
Jen Kaboksy	Women's individual	589	34	Jaehomkrue (THA); W 6–5	Chang (KOR); L 0–6	Did not advance				
Soulivong Onmanee; Jen Kaboksy	Mixed team	1181	20	—N/a	Iran; L 4–5	Did not advance				

Compound

Athlete	Event	Ranking round		Round of 32	Round of 16	Quarterfinals	Semifinals	Final / BM	
Athlete	Event	Score	Seed	Opposition Score	Opposition Score	Opposition Score	Opposition Score	Opposition Score	Rank
Lot Outtaliyung; Daliya Saidara; Khamvarn Vanlivong	Men's team	2032	12	—N/a	Malaysia; L 223–230	Did not advance			
Khamvarn Vanlivong; Phone Kamkeo	Mixed team	1350	16	Mongolia; W 141–136	South Korea; L 151–157	Did not advance			

== Athletics ==
Laos entered four athletes (2 men's and 2 women's) to participate in the athletics competition at the Games.

== Baseball ==
Laos made its Asian Games debut in the sport of baseball.

Team	Event	Round 1		Round 2		Super / Consolation		Final / BM	
Team	Event	Oppositions Scores	Rank	Oppositions Scores	Rank	Oppositions Scores	Rank	Opposition Score	Rank
Laos men's	Men's tournament	Thailand: L 0–15 (F/6); Sri Lanka: L 10–15	3	Did not advance					10

Roster

The following is the Laos roster for the men's baseball tournament of the 2018 Asian Games.

Manager
Lee Man-soo

Coaches
Park Jong-choul
Park Sang-soo

Pos.	No.	Player	Date of birth (age)	Bats	Throws	Club
IF	10	Leeyang Nyiaxue	3 April 1994 (aged 24)			(Laos) Lao J Brother
OF	11	Chinu Va	1 May 2000 (aged 18)			(Laos) Lao J Brother
IF	12	Soua Xong	27 November 1995 (aged 22)			(Laos) Lao J Brother
P	13	Phithak Hopkhop	13 October 2000 (aged 17)			(Laos) Lao J Brother
P	15	Cola Phouangkeo	28 August 2000 (aged 17)			(Laos) Lao J Brother
IF	16	Gniatou Nalor	22 November 1994 (aged 23)			(Laos) Lao J Brother
OF	18	Boy Venvongsoth	2 November 2000 (aged 17)			(Laos) Lao J Brother
OF	23	Syvone Yelee	3 June 1997 (aged 21)			(Laos) Lao J Brother
IF	33	Long Vue	4 August 2000 (aged 18)			(Laos) Lao J Brother
OF	34	Bounmee Nyiabeemoua	6 September 1997 (aged 20)			(Laos) Lao J Brother
OF	36	Thongvanh Her	8 December 1991 (aged 26)			(Laos) Lao J Brother
OF	39	Bee Sengsoulin	16 May 2000 (aged 18)			(Laos) Lao J Brother
OF	40	Soukhalom Thatsaphone	5 April 1997 (aged 21)			(Laos) Lao J Brother
OF	42	Pakaysith Phommassee	5 June 1997 (aged 21)			(Laos) Lao J Brother
IF	60	Peun Silouanglath	3 October 1998 (aged 19)			(Laos) Lao J Brother

Round 1

Pos	Team	Pld	W	L	RF	RA	PCT	GB	Qualification
1	Thailand	2	2	0	29	3	1.000	—	Preliminary
2	Sri Lanka	2	1	1	18	24	.500	1	
3	Laos	2	0	2	10	30	.000	2	

Source: OCA

21 August; 14:00	Thailand	15–0 (F/6)	Laos	Gelora Bung Karno Baseball Field, Jakarta; Attendance: 200; Umpires: Huang Jun-jeh (TPE)
21 August; 14:00	WP: Phanuwat Sukmuang		LP: Phithak Hopkhop	Gelora Bung Karno Baseball Field, Jakarta; Attendance: 200; Umpires: Huang Jun-jeh (TPE)
21 August; 14:00	HR: Naruephol Muangkasem (1)			Gelora Bung Karno Baseball Field, Jakarta; Attendance: 200; Umpires: Huang Jun-jeh (TPE)

Team	1	2	3	4	5	6	7	8	9	R	H	E
Laos	0	0	0	0	0	0	—	—	—	0	1	5
Thailand	2	4	4	2	2	1	—	—	—	15	13	1

22 August; 14:00	Laos	10–15	Sri Lanka	Gelora Bung Karno Baseball Field, Jakarta; Attendance: 400; Umpires: Yang Jae-man (KOR)
22 August; 14:00	LP: Cola Phouangkeo		WP: Chirath Karunarathne	Gelora Bung Karno Baseball Field, Jakarta; Attendance: 400; Umpires: Yang Jae-man (KOR)
22 August; 14:00	HR: Nalor Gniatou (1)			Gelora Bung Karno Baseball Field, Jakarta; Attendance: 400; Umpires: Yang Jae-man (KOR)

Team	1	2	3	4	5	6	7	8	9	R	H	E
Sri Lanka	4	1	0	1	5	0	0	1	3	15	16	1
Laos	2	2	0	0	1	3	2	0	0	10	13	3

== Boxing ==
Men

Athlete	Event	Round of 32	Round of 16	Quarterfinals	Semifinals	Final	Rank
Athlete	Event	Opposition Result	Opposition Result	Opposition Result	Opposition Result	Opposition Result	Rank
Khamphouvanh Khamsathone	–49 kg	TB Deuba (NEP); W 3–1	H Dusmatov (UZB); L 0–5	Did not advance			
Viengxay Akkhasith	–52 kg	A Usenaliev (KGZ); L 0–5	Did not advance				
Chansamone Vilaysack	–56 kg	Lee Y-c (KOR); L 0–5	Did not advance				

Women

Athlete	Event	Round of 32	Round of 16	Quarterfinals	Semifinals	Final	Rank
Athlete	Event	Opposition Result	Opposition Result	Opposition Result	Opposition Result	Opposition Result	Rank
Daomayuly Chantilath	–51 kg	Bye	Lin Y-t (TPE); RSC	Did not advance			

== Cycling ==
=== Road ===
Athlete	Event	Final	
Athlete	Event	Time	Rank
Thavone Phonasa	Men's road race	3:40:06	49
Ariya Phounsavath	Men's road race	3:29:10	25
Ariya Phounsavath	Men's time trial	1:06:23.11	16

== Esports (demonstration) ==
Arena of Valor and Clash Royale

Athlete	ID	Event	Round 1	Round 2	Round 3	Loser round 1	Loser round 2	Loser round 3	Semifinal	Final	
Athlete	ID	Event	Opposition Score	Opposition Score	Opposition Score	Opposition Score	Opposition Score	Opposition Score	Opposition Score	Opposition Score	Rank
	Nesh; TheoDu; Gohan; Maloch; Bobbyxz	Arena of Valor	Hong Kong; L 0–2	Did not advance		India; W 2–0	Hong Kong; L 0–2	Did not advance			
	@M	Clash Royale	Hong Kong; L 2–3	Did not advance		China; L 1–3	Did not advance				

== Football ==
Laos were drawn in the group A at the men's football event.

Summary

Team	Event	Group stage					Round of 16	Quarterfinal	Semifinal	Final / BM	
Team	Event	Opposition Score	Opposition Score	Opposition Score	Opposition Score	Rank	Opposition Score	Opposition Score	Opposition Score	Opposition Score	Rank
Laos men's	Men's tournament	Hong Kong; L 1–3	Palestine; L 1–2	Indonesia; L 0–3	Chinese Taipei; W 2–0	4	Did not advance				23

=== Men's tournament ===
Roster

The following is the Laos squad in the men's football tournament of the 2018 Asian Games. The team of 20 players was officially named on 7 August.

Head coach: (Singapore) Mike Wong Mun Heng

No.	Pos.	Player	Date of birth (age)	Caps	Goals	Club
1	GK	Outthilath Nammakhoth	13 September 1996 (aged 21)			(Lao Football Federation) Master 7
26	GK	Saymanolinh Paseuth	19 July 1999 (aged 19)	2		(Lao Football Federation) Young Elephant
6	DF	Kittisak Phomvongsa	27 July 1999 (aged 19)	2		(Lao Football Federation) Young Elephant
8	DF	Sonevilai Sihavong	18 August 1996 (aged 21)	1		(Lao Football Federation) Master 7
16	DF	Xayasith Singsavang	17 December 2000 (aged 17)	2		(Lao Football Federation) Young Elephant
18	DF	Xouxana Sihalath	22 July 1996 (aged 22)	2		(Lao Football Federation) Lao Army
24	DF	Aphixay Thanakhanty	15 July 1998 (aged 20)	2		(Lao Football Federation) Young Elephant
7	MF	Phoutthasay Khochalern (captain)	29 December 1995 (aged 22)	2	1	(Football Association of Thailand) Nakhon Pathom United
10	MF	Lathasay Lounlasy	29 March 1998 (aged 20)	2	1	(Lao Football Federation) Young Elephant
13	MF	Soulivanh Nivone	16 May 1998 (aged 20)			(Lao Football Federation) Young Elephant
14	MF	Kiengthavesak Xayxanapanya	14 March 1999 (aged 19)	2		(Lao Football Federation) Lao Police Club
15	MF	Kaharn Phetsivilay	9 September 1998 (aged 19)			(Lao Football Federation) Young Elephant
17	MF	Bounphachan Bounkong	29 November 2000 (aged 17)	2		(Lao Football Federation) Young Elephant
19	MF	Kydavone Souvanny	22 November 1999 (aged 18)			(Lao Football Federation) Young Elephant
21	MF	Tiny Bounmalay*	6 June 1993 (aged 25)	2		(Lao Football Federation) Lao Police Club
22	MF	Phithack Kongmathilath	6 August 1996 (aged 22)	2	1	(Lao Football Federation) Lao Army
23	MF	Phouthone Innalay*	11 February 1992 (aged 26)	2		(Lao Football Federation) Lao Army
9	FW	Soukchinda Natphasouk	30 October 1995 (aged 22)	2		(Lao Football Federation) Lao Police Club
11	FW	Chansamone Phommalivong	6 April 1998 (aged 20)			(Lao Football Federation) Young Elephant
25	FW	Somxay Keohanam	27 July 1998 (aged 20)	1		(Lao Football Federation) Young Elephant

* Over-aged player.

Group A

Pos	Team	Pld	W	D	L	GF	GA	GD	Pts	Qualification
1	Indonesia (H)	4	3	0	1	11	3	+8	9	Advance to knockout stage
2	Palestine	4	2	2	0	5	3	+2	8	Advance to knockout stage
3	Hong Kong	4	2	1	1	9	5	+4	7	Advance to knockout stage
4	Laos	4	1	0	3	4	8	−4	3	
5	Chinese Taipei	4	0	1	3	0	10	−10	1	

Source: Asian Games 2018
Rules for classification: Group stage tiebreakers
(H) Hosts
10 August 2018
16:00 UTC+7

Laos	1–3	Hong Kong
Kongmathilath 62'	Report	Cheng Chin Lung 20'; Tan Chun Lok 40'; Lounlasy 86' (o.g.)

Patriot Candrabhaga Stadium, Bekasi
Referee: Timur Faizullin (Kyrgyzstan)

12 August 2018
16:00 UTC+7

Palestine	2–1	Laos
Qumbor 83'; Bahdari 90+5'	Report	Khochalern 14'

Patriot Candrabhaga Stadium, Bekasi
Referee: Bijan Heidari (Iran)

17 August 2018
19:00 UTC+7

Laos	0–3	Indonesia
	Report	Beto 14', 47'; Ricky 75'

Patriot Candrabhaga Stadium, Bekasi
Referee: Zaid Thamer Mohammed (Iraq)

20 August 2018
19:00 UTC+7

Chinese Taipei	0–2	Laos
	Report	Phommalivong 5'; Bounmalay 74' (pen.)

Pakansari Stadium, Cibinong
Referee: Ali Shaban (Kuwait)

== Judo ==
Laos participated in Judo at the games with 6 athletes.

Key:

- 1st number — Ippon
- 2nd number — Waza-ari
- s — Shido

Men

Athlete	Event	Round of 32	Round of 16	Quarterfinals	Semifinals	Repechage	Final / BM	Rank
Athlete	Event	Opposition Result	Opposition Result	Opposition Result	Opposition Result	Opposition Result	Opposition Result	Rank
Soukphaxay Sithisane	–60 kg	Yu KT (HKG); W 10–00	Lee H-r (KOR); L 00s2–10	Did not advance				
Lamphan Manivanh	–73 kg	B Khojazoda (TJK); L 00s2–10	Did not advance					
Chittakon Xayasan	–81 kg	Gao HY (CHN); L 00–10	Did not advance					

Women

Athlete	Event	Round of 32	Round of 16	Quarterfinals	Semifinals	Repechage	Final / BM	Rank
Athlete	Event	Opposition Result	Opposition Result	Opposition Result	Opposition Result	Opposition Result	Opposition Result	Rank
Viengxay Vilayphone	–48 kg	—N/a	D Keldiyorova (UZB); L 00–11	Did not advance				
Chindamany Xayavongsa	–57 kg	Bye	Lien C-l (TPE); L 00–10	Did not advance				
Khonema Chanthakoummane	–78 kg	—N/a	VI Safitri (INA); W 10–00	R Sato (JPN); L 00–10	Did not advance	I Oeda (THA); L 00–10	Did not advance	

== Karate ==
Laos participated in the karate competition at the Games with four athletes (3 men's and 1 women).

== Paragliding ==
Men

Athlete	Event	Round										Total	Rank
Athlete	Event	1	2	3	4	5	6	7	8	9	10	Total	Rank
Bounpathom Souvannamethy	Individual accuracy	242	~~500~~	18	500	102	3	500	500	202	30	2097	27
Paseuthsack Vannasouk	Individual accuracy	~~500~~	191	500	296	197	0	11	7	156	5	1363	22
Kingphet Bannavong; Vilasith Savath; Kitsada Siharath; Bounpathom Souvannamethy; Paseuthsack Vannasouk	Team accuracy	1747	1833	1053	2296	1414	1503	—N/a				9846	12
Kingphet Bannavong; Paseuthsack Vannasouk	Cross-country	232	268	238	166	358	—N/a					1262	9

== Pencak silat ==
Seni

Athlete	Event	Preliminary		Final	
Athlete	Event	Result	Rank	Result	Rank
Souksavanh Chanthilath	Men's tunggal	452	3 Q	429	6
Alisack Singsouvong; Amphonh Khounchaleun	Men's ganda	—N/a		543	7
Piyaphong Champavannalath; Vanxay Bounnavong; Thanongsak Phanthavong	Men's regu	—N/a		426	7
Tunee Vilaysack	Women's tunggal	455	1 Q	443	4
Motlaya Vongphakdy; Aphinyo Douangmany	Women's ganda	—N/a		545	5
Tunee Vilaysack; Motlaya Vongphakdy; Aphinyo Douangmany	Women's regu	—N/a		442	7

Tanding

Athlete	Event	Round of 16	Quarterfinals	Semifinals	Final	
Athlete	Event	Opposition Result	Opposition Result	Opposition Result	Opposition Result	Rank
Bo Thammavongsa	Men's –55 kg	Bye	JA Gomes (TLS); W 5–0	A Malik (INA); L 0–5	Did not advance	3rd place, bronze medalist(s)
Phoumiphon Vongphakdy	Men's –60 kg	Bye	HY Kusumah (INA); L 0–5	Did not advance		
Mino Vongphakdy	Men's –65 kg	R Rashid (SGP); W 4–1	Nguyễn NT (VIE); L 0–5	Did not advance		
Okhe Botsavang	Men's –70 kg	Phạm TA (VIE); L 0–5	Did not advance			
Johnny Vongphakdy	Men's –75 kg	Bye	MF Khalid (MAS); L 0–5	Did not advance		
Savatvilay Phimmasone	Men's –90 kg	—N/a	Nguyễn DT (VIE); L 0–5	Did not advance		
Olathay Sounthavong	Women's –55 kg	Bye	P Enopia (PHI); W 5–0	W Wita (INA); L 0–5	Did not advance	3rd place, bronze medalist(s)
Nong Oy Vongphakdy	Women's –60 kg	Bye	T Kalnazarova (KGZ); W 5–0	SK Shahrem (SGP); W 3–2	ST Monita (INA); L 0–5	2nd place, silver medalist(s)

== Sepak takraw ==
Men

Athlete	Event	Group stage					Semifinal	Final	
Athlete	Event	Opposition Score	Opposition Score	Opposition Score	Opposition Score	Rank	Opposition Score	Opposition Score	Rank
Adong Phoumisin; Yothin Sombatputhone; Noum Souvannalith; Phitthasanh Bounpaseuth; Kantana Nanthisen; Vilaxay Volachak	Quadrant	Myanmar (MYA); W 2–0	Japan (JPN); L 1–2	China (CHN); W 2–0	Indonesia (INA); L 0–2	3	Did not advance		
Yothin Sombatputhone; Chanthalak Chanthavong; Xaibandith Thadanabouth; Noum Souvannalith; Phitthasanh Bounpaseuth; Kantana Nanthisen; Laksanaxay Bounphaivanh; Kongsy Yang; Phonsavanh Keoviseth	Team doubles	Myanmar (MYA); W 2–1	Thailand (THA); L 0–3	—N/a		2 Q	Indonesia (INA); W 2–0	Thailand (THA); L 0–2	2nd place, silver medalist(s)

Women

Athlete	Event	Group stage				Semifinal	Final	
Athlete	Event	Opposition Score	Opposition Score	Opposition Score	Rank	Opposition Score	Opposition Score	Rank
Koy Xayavong; Norkham Vongxay; Sonsavan Keosouliya; Santisouk Chandala; Chiep Banxavang; Nouandam Volabouth	Quadrant	Myanmar (MYA); W 2–0	South Korea (KOR); W 2–0	Indonesia (INA); L 0–2	2 Q	Thailand (THA); L 0–2	Did not advance	3rd place, bronze medalist(s)
Ladsamee Vilaysouk; Falida Duangmala; Koy Xayavong; Norkham Vongxay; Sonsavan Keosouliya; Santisouk Chandala; Chiep Banxavang; Somphouk Phimmasone; Nouandam Volabouth; Namfonh Morladok; On Oumar Phaviset	Team regu	Thailand (THA); L 0–3	India (IND); W 2–1	South Korea (KOR); L 0–3	3	Did not advance		

== Shooting ==
Men

Athlete	Event	Qualification		Final	
Athlete	Event	Points	Rank	Points	Rank
Phatthana Phalichan	10 m air pistol	531	38	Did not advance	

Women

Athlete	Event	Qualification		Final	
Athlete	Event	Points	Rank	Points	Rank
Soukthasone Phimmasone	10 m air pistol	525	39	Did not advance	
Viengsavanh Phommakong	10 m air pistol	517	41	Did not advance	

Mixed team

Athlete	Event	Qualification		Final	
Athlete	Event	Points	Rank	Points	Rank
Phatthana Phalichan; Viengsavanh Phommakong	10 m air pistol	717	20	Did not advance	

== Soft tennis ==
Athlete	Event	Group stage				Quarterfinals	Semifinals	Final	
Athlete	Event	Opposition Score	Opposition Score	Opposition Score	Rank	Opposition Score	Opposition Score	Opposition Score	Rank
Palinya Inthalangsy	Men's singles	K Nagae (JPN); L 0–4	Chen Y-h (TPE); L 1–4	Trần VC (VIE); W 4–0	3	Did not advance			
Somxay Vannasak	Men's singles	Lê PV (VIE); W 4–2	AE Sie (INA); L 0–4	S Doeum (CAM); L 1–4	3	Did not advance			
Maniphone Aliya	Women's singles	A Mehra (IND); L 1–4	Yu YY (CHN); L 0–4	N Bulgan (MGL); L 0–4	4	Did not advance			
Phonesamai Champamanivong	Women's singles	K Onoue (JPN); L 0–4	Kim Y-h (KOR); L 0–4	—N/a	3	Did not advance			
Chittakone Xaiyalin; Phonesamai Champamanivong	Mixed doubles	R Dhiman / A Tiwari (IND); W 5–3	Yu K-w / Cheng C-l (TPE); L 0–5	—N/a	2	Did not advance			
Somxay Vannasak; Maniphone Aliya	Mixed doubles	Ri C-i / Hong J-s (PRK); W 5–0^{R}	Kim K-s / Mun H-g (PAK); L 0–5	—N/a	2	Did not advance			
Palinya Inthalangsy; Anandone Khamphoumy; Khanthanou Phongsavanh; Somxay Vannasak; Chittakone Xaiyalin	Men's team	Philippines (PHI); L 1–2	South Korea (KOR); L 0–3	Pakistan (PAK); W 3–0	3	Did not advance			

== Swimming ==
Men

Athlete	Event	Heats		Final	
Athlete	Event	Time	Rank	Time	Rank
Santisouk Inthavong	50 m freestyle	26.62	47	Did not advance	
Santisouk Inthavong	50 m backstroke	31.09	33	Did not advance	

Women

Athlete	Event	Heats		Final	
Athlete	Event	Time	Rank	Time	Rank
Siri Arun Budcharern	50 m freestyle	31.41	25	Did not advance	
Siri Arun Budcharern	50 m breaststroke	39.85	28	Did not advance	
Sompathana Chamberlain	50 m freestyle	32.06	29	Did not advance	
Sompathana Chamberlain	50 m backstroke	39.18	22	Did not advance	
Sompathana Chamberlain	50 m butterfly	36.82	26	Did not advance	

== Table tennis ==
Individual

Athlete	Event	Round 1	Round 2	Round of 16	Quarterfinals	Semifinals	Final	
Athlete	Event	Opposition Score	Opposition Score	Opposition Score	Opposition Score	Opposition Score	Opposition Score	Rank
Seng Arthid Vongdalasinh	Men's singles	P Tanviriyavechakul (THA); L 0–4	Did not advance					
Sonpasith Mosangsinh	Men's singles	I Ranasingha (SRI); W 1–1^{r}	Lee S-s (KOR); L 0–4	Did not advance				
Nitnapha Kongphet	Women's singles	K Nur Hawwa (INA); L 0–4	Did not advance					
Southammavong Thiphakone	Women's singles	R Sintya (INA); L 0–4	Did not advance					
Seng Arthid Vongdalasinh; Nitnapha Kongphet	Mixed doubles	M Hamie / M Khory (LBN); L 0–3	Did not advance					
Sonpasith Mosangsinh; Southammavong Thiphakone	Mixed doubles	MBA Negara / R Sintya (INA); L 0–3	Did not advance					

Team

Athlete	Event	Group stage					Quarterfinal	Semifinal	Final	
Athlete	Event	Opposition Score	Opposition Score	Opposition Score	Opposition Score	Rank	Opposition Score	Opposition Score	Opposition Score	Rank
Seng Arthid Vongdalasinh; Sonpasith Mosangsinh; Dalaphone Seelivanno; Misay Phonsavat	Men's	Malaysia (MAS); L 0–3	North Korea (PRK); L 0–3	China (CHN); L 0–3	Nepal (NEP); L 1–3	5	Did not advance			

== Taekwondo ==
Poomsae

Athlete	Event	Round of 16	Quarterfinal	Semifinal	Final	
Athlete	Event	Opposition Score	Opposition Score	Opposition Score	Opposition Score	Rank
Soukthavy Panyasith	Men's individual	Kang M-s (KOR); L 7.65–8.24	Did not advance			
Kidavone Philavong	Women's individual	M Umehara (JPN); L 7.53–7.68	Did not advance			

Kyorugi

Athlete	Event	Round of 32	Round of 16	Quarterfinal	Semifinal	Final	
Athlete	Event	Opposition Score	Opposition Score	Opposition Score	Opposition Score	Opposition Score	Rank
Thipphakone Kuangmany	Men's −58 kg	N Corte-Real (TLS); W 40–18	S Suzuki (JPN); L 28–50	Did not advance			
Phounathone Souksavath	Men's −63 kg	A N I Hakim (MAS); L 12–32	Did not advance				
Sonexay Mangkheua	Men's −68 kg	G Al-Asmari (KSA); L 5–18	Did not advance				
Somsanouk Phommavanh	Men's −80 kg	N Maan (IND); L 18–32	Did not advance				
Sonesavanh Sirimanotham	Women's −67 kg	—N/a	S Yangtsho (BHU); L 11–23	Did not advance			

== Weightlifting ==
Laos competed in weightlifting competition with two athletes (1 men and 1 women).

Men

Athlete	Event	Snatch		Clean & jerk		Total	Rank
Athlete	Event	Result	Rank	Result	Rank	Total	Rank
Sengthavee Panhyathip	−56 kg	85	9	110	9	195	9

Women

Athlete	Event	Snatch		Clean & jerk		Total	Rank
Athlete	Event	Result	Rank	Result	Rank	Total	Rank
Alisa Xaiyasit	−58 kg	63	2	78	7	141	7

== Wushu ==
Sanda

Athlete	Event	Round of 32	Round of 16	Quarterfinal	Semifinal	Final	
Athlete	Event	Opposition Score	Opposition Score	Opposition Score	Opposition Score	Opposition Score	Rank
Khamla Soukaphone	Men's –56 kg	Bye	P Thakulla (NEP); W 2–0	Bùi T G (VIE); L 0–2	Did not advance		
Noukhith Latsaphao	Men's –60 kg	Bye	P Balawardhana (SRI); L 0–2	Did not advance			
Damxoumphone Khieosavath	Men's –65 kg	—N/a	B Lama (NEP); W 0–0 ^{TV}	K Hotak (AFG); L 0–2	Did not advance		
Kalanh Khotsombath	Men's –70 kg	—N/a	Bye	M Mohammadseifi (IRI); L 0–0 ^{TV}	Did not advance		
Mimi Yoysaykham	Women's –52 kg	—N/a	D Wally (PHI); L 0–2	Did not advance			
Peuy Manivan	Women's –60 kg	—N/a	Cai YY (CHN); L 0–1	Did not advance			

Key: * TV – Technical victory.
