= Taekwondo at the 2018 Asian Games – Men's individual poomsae =

Taekwondo competition

Men's individual poomsae at the 2018 Asian Games
- Venue: Jakarta Convention Center
- Date: 19 August 2018
- Competitors: 16 from 16 nations

Medalists
gold medal	Kang Min-sung	South Korea
silver medal	Kourosh Bakhtiar	Iran
bronze medal	Chen Ching	Chinese Taipei
bronze medal	Pongporn Suvittayarak	Thailand

The men's individual poomsae event at the 2018 Asian Games took place on 19 August 2018 at Jakarta Convention Center Plenary Hall, Jakarta, Indonesia.

Kang Min-sung won South Korea's first gold medal at the 18th Asian Games in this event. Kang defeated Kourosh Bakhtiar of Iran in the men's individual poomsae final to claim a gold medal at the Asian Games in Indonesia. Chen Ching from Chinese Taipei and Pongporn Suvittayarak of Thailand finished third and won the bronze medal.

The poomsae competition was consisted of two patterns in each round. From Preliminary round to quarterfinals two Poomsae was selected randomly from Recognized Poomsae but from semifinals to the final one Poomsae was selected from Recognized Poomsae and one from New Poomsae.

Recognized Poomsae were Koryo, Keumgang, Taeback, Pyongwon and Shipjin. while New Poomsae were Bigak 2, Bigak 3 (Nareusya), Himchari, Saebyeol.

== Schedule ==
All times are Western Indonesia Time (UTC+07:00)

Date	Time	Event
Sunday, 19 August 2018	09:00	Round of 16
Sunday, 19 August 2018	09:00	Quarterfinals
Sunday, 19 August 2018	15:00	Semifinals
Sunday, 19 August 2018	15:00	Final

== Results ==
Round of 16
Kourosh Bakhtiar (IRI)	8.22
Phal Sovannat (CAM)	7.81
Abdurrahman Wahyu (INA)	8.33
Sun Shine (MYA)	7.93
Chen Ching (TPE)	8.38
Kamal Shrestha (NEP)	7.51
Hu Mingda (CHN)	8.34
Wahid Moghis (KSA)	7.86
Pongporn Suvittayarak (THA)	8.14
Nguyễn Thiên Phụng (VIE)	7.98
Rodolfo Reyes (PHI)	8.08
Ruslan Manaspayev (KAZ)	7.08
Kang Min-sung (KOR)	8.24
Soukthavy Panyasith (LAO)	7.65
Choy Cheuk Yin (HKG)	7.55
Chew Wei Yan (MAS)	8.02

Quarterfinals
Kourosh Bakhtiar (IRI)	8.25
Abdurrahman Wahyu (INA)	8.19
Chen Ching (TPE)	8.31
Hu Mingda (CHN)	8.15
Pongporn Suvittayarak (THA)	8.32
Rodolfo Reyes (PHI)	8.08
Kang Min-sung (KOR)	8.35
Chew Wei Yan (MAS)	8.20

Semifinals
Kourosh Bakhtiar (IRI)	8.57
Chen Ching (TPE)	8.48
Pongporn Suvittayarak (THA)	8.49
Kang Min-sung (KOR)	8.70

Final
Kourosh Bakhtiar (IRI)	8.73
Kang Min-sung (KOR)	8.81
