= Sepak takraw at the 2018 Asian Games – Men's team doubles =

Men's team doubles at the 2018 Asian Games
- Venue: Ranau Sports Hall
- Date: 23–25 August 2018
- Competitors: 60 from 7 nations

Medalists
gold medal	Thailand
silver medal	Laos
bronze medal	Indonesia
bronze medal	Japan

The men's team double regu sepak takraw competition at the 2018 Asian Games was held at Ranau Sports Hall, Palembang, Indonesia from 23 to 25 August 2018. Men's team doubles competition was held for the first time in the Asian Games history.

== Squads ==
Indonesia	Japan	Laos	Myanmar
Mohamad Herson Saipul; Muhammad Hardiansyah Muliang; Rezki Yusuf Djaina; Nofrizal; Saiful Rijal; Husni Uba; Hendra Pago; Rizky Abdul Rahman Pago; Abdul Halim Radjiu	Yuki Sato; Seiya Takano; Takeshi Terashima; Toshitaka Naito; Ryo Masuda; Tsubasa Sato; Masahiro Yamada; Hirokazu Kobayashi; Masanori Hayashi	Yothin Sombatphouthone; Chanthalak Chanthavong; Xaibandith Thadanabouth; Noum Souvannalith; Phitthasanh Bounpaseuth; Kantana Nanthisen; Laksanaxay Bounphaivanh; Kongsy Yang; Phonsavanh Keoviseth	Wai Lin Aung; Zin Min Oo; Aung Myo Swe; Zaw Latt; Thant Zin Oo; Htet Myat Thu; Aung Pyae Tun; Zin Ko Ko; Aung Myo Naing
Philippines	Thailand	Vietnam	
Joeart Jumawan; Rheyjey Ortouste; Alvin Pangan; Joshua Bullo; John Jeffrey Morcillos; Emmanuel Escote; John-John Bobier; John Carlo Lee; Reznan Pabriga	Anuwat Chaichana; Seksan Tubtong; Pornchai Kaokaew; Wichan Temkort; Pattarapong Yupadee; Assadin Wongyota; Rachan Viphan; Jirasak Pakbuangoen; Suriyon Koonpimon	Đỗ Mạnh Tuấn; Nguyễn Quốc Anh; Nguyễn Hoàng Lân; Nguyễn Hữu Danh; Đầu Văn Hoàng; Lê Văn Nghĩa	

== Results ==
All times are Western Indonesia Time (UTC+07:00)

=== Preliminary ===
==== Group A ====
Pos	Team	Pld	W	L	MF	MA	MD	Pts	Qualification
1	Indonesia	3	2	1	6	3	+3	4	Semifinals
2	Japan	3	2	1	5	4	+1	4	Semifinals
3	Philippines	3	1	2	4	5	−1	2	
4	Vietnam	3	1	2	3	6	−3	2	

Source: OCA

Date	Time		Score		Regu 1			Regu 2			Regu 3		
Date	Time		Score		Set 1	Set 2	Set 3	Set 1	Set 2	Set 3	Set 1	Set 2	Set 3
23 Aug	09:00	Indonesia	1–2	Japan	2–0			0–2			0–2		
23 Aug	09:00	Indonesia	1–2	Japan	21–19	21–15		19–21	19–21		15–21	19–21	
23 Aug	09:00	Vietnam	1–2	Philippines	2–1			0–2			0–2		
23 Aug	09:00	Vietnam	1–2	Philippines	21–19	18–21	21–17	18–21	18–21		14–21	12–21	
23 Aug	15:00	Indonesia	2–1	Philippines	2–0			2–0			0–2		
23 Aug	15:00	Indonesia	2–1	Philippines	21–17	21–16		21–6	21–9		23–25	20–22	
23 Aug	15:00	Vietnam	2–1	Japan	1–2			2–0			2–1		
23 Aug	15:00	Vietnam	2–1	Japan	14–21	25–23	17–21	21–18	21–19		21–14	10–21	21–12
24 Aug	09:00	Indonesia	3–0	Vietnam	2–0			2–0			2–0		
24 Aug	09:00	Indonesia	3–0	Vietnam	21–18	22–20		21–19	21–12		23–21	21–14	
24 Aug	09:00	Japan	2–1	Philippines	2–0			1–2			2–0		
24 Aug	09:00	Japan	2–1	Philippines	21–17	21–19		21–18	10–21	24–25	21–14	21–10	

==== Group B ====
Pos	Team	Pld	W	L	MF	MA	MD	Pts	Qualification
1	Thailand	2	2	0	5	1	+4	4	Semifinals
2	Laos	2	1	1	2	4	−2	2	Semifinals
3	Myanmar	2	0	2	2	4	−2	0	

Source: OCA

Date	Time		Score		Regu 1			Regu 2			Regu 3		
Date	Time		Score		Set 1	Set 2	Set 3	Set 1	Set 2	Set 3	Set 1	Set 2	Set 3
23 Aug	09:00	Thailand	2–1	Myanmar	1–2			2–0			2–0		
23 Aug	09:00	Thailand	2–1	Myanmar	18–21	21–12	17–21	21–13	21–18		21–19	21–13	
23 Aug	15:00	Laos	2–1	Myanmar	0–2			2–0			2–0		
23 Aug	15:00	Laos	2–1	Myanmar	17–21	8–21		21–18	22–20		21–15	21–13	
24 Aug	09:00	Thailand	3–0	Laos	2–0			2–0			2–0		
24 Aug	09:00	Thailand	3–0	Laos	21–12	21–14		21–10	21–10		21–10	21–14	

=== Knockout round ===
Semifinals
24 August
Indonesia	0
Laos	2
24 August
Thailand	2
Japan	0

Gold medal match
25 August
Laos	0
Thailand	2

==== Semifinals ====
Date	Time		Score		Regu 1			Regu 2			Regu 3		
Date	Time		Score		Set 1	Set 2	Set 3	Set 1	Set 2	Set 3	Set 1	Set 2	Set 3
24 Aug	15:00	Indonesia	0–2	Laos	0–2			1–2					
24 Aug	15:00	Indonesia	0–2	Laos	10–21	19–21		17–21	21–10	17–21			
24 Aug	15:00	Thailand	2–0	Japan	2–0			2–1					
24 Aug	15:00	Thailand	2–0	Japan	21–19	21–10		21–11	20–22	21–16			

==== Gold medal match ====
Date	Time		Score		Regu 1			Regu 2			Regu 3		
Date	Time		Score		Set 1	Set 2	Set 3	Set 1	Set 2	Set 3	Set 1	Set 2	Set 3
25 Aug	09:00	Laos	0–2	Thailand	0–2			1–2					
25 Aug	09:00	Laos	0–2	Thailand	18–21	18–21		18–21	21–18	14–21			
