= Sepak takraw at the 2018 Asian Games – Women's quadrant =

Women's quadrant at the 2018 Asian Games
- Venue: Ranau Sports Hall
- Date: 28 August – 1 September 2018
- Competitors: 54 from 9 nations

Medalists
gold medal	Thailand
silver medal	Vietnam
bronze medal	Indonesia
bronze medal	Laos

The women's quadrant regu sepak takraw competition at the 2018 Asian Games was held at Ranau Sports Hall, Palembang, Indonesia from 28 August to 1 September. Women's quadrant competition was held for the first time in the Asian Games history.

== Squads ==
India	Indonesia	Japan	Laos
Chaoba Devi Oinam; Annam Tharangini; Maipak Devi Ayekpam; Manisha Kumari; Aruna Devi Mutum; Khushbu	Leni; Dini Mita Sari; Florensia Cristy; Lena; Akyko Micheel Kapito; Kusnelia	Chiharu Yano; Sawa Aoki; Satomi Ishihara; Yuumi Kawamata; Naoko Nakatsuka; Azusa Kikuchi	Koy Xayavong; Norkham Vongxay; Sonsavan Keosouliya; Santisouk Chandala; Chiep Banxavang; Nouandam Volabouth
Malaysia	Myanmar	South Korea	Thailand
Nurul Izzatul Hikmah; Rahilah Harun; Nor Farhana Ismail; Emilia Eva Natasha; Nurul Aqirah Mat Tahir; Siti Nor Suhaida Jafri	Khin Hnin Wai; Aye Aye Than; Nant Yin Yin Myint; Phyu Phyu Than; Nan Su Myat San; Ya Mong Zin	Kim Dong-hee; Kim I-seul; Bae Han-oul; Jeon Gyu-mi; Lee Min-ju; Park Seon-ju	Masaya Duangsri; Sasiwimol Janthasit; Fueangfa Praphatsarang; Somruedee Pruepruk; Payom Srihongsa; Wiphada Chitphuan
Vietnam			
Nguyễn Thị Quyên; Giáp Thị Hiền; Dương Thị Xuyên; Hoàng Thị Hoà; Nguyễn Thị Phương Trinh; Nguyễn Thị My			

== Results ==
All times are Western Indonesia Time (UTC+07:00)

=== Preliminary ===
==== Group A ====
Pos	Team	Pld	W	L	SF	SA	SD	Pts	Qualification
1	Indonesia	3	3	0	6	2	+4	6	Semifinals
2	Laos	3	2	1	4	2	+2	4	Semifinals
3	Myanmar	3	1	2	3	4	−1	2	
4	South Korea	3	0	3	1	6	−5	0	

Source: OCA

Date	Time		Score		Set 1	Set 2	Set 3
28 Aug	13:00	Laos	2–0	Myanmar	21–19	21–13	
28 Aug	13:00	Indonesia	2–1	South Korea	21–15	19–21	21–18
29 Aug	11:00	Laos	2–0	South Korea	22–20	21–17	
29 Aug	11:00	Indonesia	2–1	Myanmar	21–19	20–22	21–14
29 Aug	16:30	South Korea	0–2	Myanmar	12–21	20–22	
29 Aug	16:30	Indonesia	2–0	Laos	21–7	21–16	

==== Group B ====
Pos	Team	Pld	W	L	SF	SA	SD	Pts	Qualification
1	Thailand	4	4	0	8	0	+8	8	Semifinals
2	Vietnam	4	3	1	6	3	+3	6	Semifinals
3	Myanmar	4	2	2	4	4	0	4	
4	Japan	4	1	3	3	6	−3	2	
5	India	4	0	4	0	8	−8	0	

Source: OCA

Date	Time		Score		Set 1	Set 2	Set 3
28 Aug	14:00	Thailand	2–0	Malaysia	21–7	21–10	
28 Aug	14:00	Japan	2–0	India	21–12	21–8	
29 Aug	10:00	Thailand	2–0	Vietnam	21–18	21–13	
29 Aug	10:00	India	0–2	Malaysia	13–21	9–21	
29 Aug	15:30	Japan	0–2	Malaysia	18–21	17–21	
29 Aug	15:30	Vietnam	2–0	India	21–6	21–12	
30 Aug	12:30	Vietnam	2–0	Malaysia	21–11	21–15	
30 Aug	12:30	Thailand	2–0	Japan	21–10	21–13	
30 Aug	16:30	Thailand	2–0	India	21–7	21–6	
30 Aug	16:30	Japan	1–2	Vietnam	21–19	12–21	18–21

=== Knockout round ===
Semifinals
31 August
Indonesia	1
Vietnam	2
31 August
Thailand	2
Laos	0

Gold medal match
1 September
Vietnam	0
Thailand	2

==== Semifinals ====
Date	Time		Score		Set 1	Set 2	Set 3
31 Aug	14:00	Indonesia	1–2	Vietnam	20–22	21–15	19–21
31 Aug	14:00	Thailand	2–0	Laos	21–17	25–24	

==== Gold medal match ====
Date	Time		Score		Set 1	Set 2	Set 3
01 Sep	10:00	Vietnam	0–2	Thailand	8–21	10–21	
