= Sepak takraw at the 2018 Asian Games – Men's quadrant =

Men's quadrant at the 2018 Asian Games
- Venue: Ranau Sports Hall
- Date: 28 August – 1 September 2018
- Competitors: 59 from 10 nations

Medalists
gold medal	Indonesia
silver medal	Japan
bronze medal	Singapore
bronze medal	Vietnam

The men's quadrant regu sepak takraw competition at the 2018 Asian Games was held at Ranau Sports Hall, Palembang, Indonesia from 28 August to 1 September 2018. This was held for the first time in the Asian Games history.

== Squads ==
China	Indonesia	Iran	Japan
Fan Xu; Bai Yinpeng; Zhang Ruhao; Wang Wei; Kang Xinyu; Yang Jiapeng	Muhammad Hardiansyah Muliang; Nofrizal; Saiful Rijal; Husni Uba; Rizky Abdul Rahman Pago; Abdul Halim Radjiu	Mehrdad Jafari; Omid Hassani; Amir Khani; Vahid Maleki; Vahid Ebrahimi; Abdolnaser Pangh	Yuki Sato; Seiya Takano; Takeshi Terashima; Toshitaka Naito; Hirokazu Kobayashi; Masanori Hayashi
Laos	Myanmar	Nepal	Pakistan
Adong Phoumisin; Yothin Sombatphouthone; Noum Souvannalith; Phitthasanh Bounpaseuth; Kantana Nanthisen; Vilaxay Volachak	Aung Thu Min; Zin Min Oo; Aung Myo Swe; Si Thu Lin; Thant Zin Oo; Aung Pyae Tun	Dipesh Jung Thapa; Sanjeet Dhimal; Rupesh Sunar; Govinda Magar; Rabin Bhattarai	Shabbir Ahmed; Shiraz Asif; Hussain Ahmed; Shahid Hameed; Sarfaraz Rehman; Syed Abdul Basit
Singapore	Vietnam		
Mohd Al-Haj Kasmanani; Afif Safiee; Farhan Aman; Khairilshamy Shamsudin; Mohd Asri Aron; Farhan Amran	Đỗ Mạnh Tuấn; Nguyễn Quốc Anh; Nguyễn Hoàng Lân; Nguyễn Hữu Danh; Đầu Văn Hoàng; Lê Văn Nghĩa		

== Results ==
All times are Western Indonesia Time (UTC+07:00)

=== Preliminary ===
==== Group A ====
Pos	Team	Pld	W	L	SF	SA	SD	Pts	Qualification
1	Indonesia	4	4	0	8	0	+8	8	Semifinals
2	Japan	4	3	1	6	4	+2	6	Semifinals
3	Laos	4	2	2	5	4	+1	4	
4	Myanmar	4	1	3	3	6	−3	2	
5	China	4	0	4	0	8	−8	0	

Source: OCA

Date	Time		Score		Set 1	Set 2	Set 3
28 Aug	15:30	Myanmar	0–2	Laos	18–21	17–21	
28 Aug	15:30	Indonesia	2–0	Japan	21–15	21–12	
29 Aug	12:30	Laos	1–2	Japan	18–21	21–12	21–23
29 Aug	12:30	Indonesia	2–0	China	21–13	21–7	
30 Aug	10:00	Myanmar	1–2	Japan	16–21	21–12	18–21
30 Aug	10:00	China	0–2	Laos	18–21	14–21	
30 Aug	14:00	Myanmar	2–0	China	21–16	21–13	
30 Aug	14:00	Indonesia	2–0	Laos	21–19	21–12	
31 Aug	10:00	China	0–2	Japan	9–21	12–21	
31 Aug	10:00	Indonesia	2–0	Myanmar	21–14	23–21	

==== Group B ====
Pos	Team	Pld	W	L	SF	SA	SD	Pts	Qualification
1	Vietnam	4	4	0	8	1	+7	8	Semifinals
2	Singapore	4	3	1	7	2	+5	6	Semifinals
3	Iran	4	2	2	4	4	0	4	
4	Nepal	4	1	3	2	6	−4	2	
5	Pakistan	4	0	4	0	8	−8	0	

Source: OCA

Date	Time		Score		Set 1	Set 2	Set 3
28 Aug	16:30	Nepal	0–2	Vietnam	4–21	3–21	
28 Aug	16:30	Singapore	2–0	Pakistan	21–8	21–4	
29 Aug	13:30	Iran	2–0	Pakistan	21–4	21–2	
29 Aug	13:30	Singapore	2–0	Nepal	21–8	21–7	
30 Aug	11:00	Nepal	2–0	Pakistan	21–16	21–8	
30 Aug	11:00	Iran	0–2	Vietnam	16–21	24–25	
30 Aug	15:00	Nepal	0–2	Iran	11–21	7–21	
30 Aug	15:00	Singapore	1–2	Vietnam	21–19	17–21	15–21
31 Aug	11:00	Vietnam	2–0	Pakistan	21–5	21–2	
31 Aug	11:00	Singapore	2–0	Iran	21–19	21–16	

=== Knockout round ===
Semifinals
31 August
Indonesia	2
Singapore	0
31 August
Vietnam	0
Japan	2

Gold medal match
1 September
Indonesia	2
Japan	1

==== Semifinals ====
Date	Time		Score		Set 1	Set 2	Set 3
31 Aug	15:30	Indonesia	2–0	Singapore	21–8	21–12	
31 Aug	15:30	Vietnam	0–2	Japan	17–21	15–21	

==== Gold medal match ====
Date	Time		Score		Set 1	Set 2	Set 3
01 Sep	12:30	Indonesia	2–1	Japan	15–21	21–14	21–16
