= Philippines at the 2018 Asian Games =

- IOC code: PHI
- NOC: Philippines Olympic Committee
- Website: www.olympic.ph (in English)

in Jakarta and Palembang
- Competitors: 272 in 31 sports
- Flag bearers: Jordan Clarkson (Opening); Margielyn Didal (Closing)
- Officials: 63
- Medals Ranked 19th: Gold 4 Silver 2 Bronze 15 Total 21

Asian Games appearances (overview)
- 1951; 1954; 1958; 1962; 1966; 1970; 1974; 1978; 1982; 1986; 1990; 1994; 1998; 2002; 2006; 2010; 2014; 2018; 2022; 2026

The Philippines participated at the 2018 Asian Games in Jakarta and Palembang, Indonesia from 18 August to 2 September 2018. The country won 21 medals (4 gold, 2 silver, and 15 bronze) to finish 19th overall in the medal tally of the games; an improvement from 22nd place placement of the country in the previous 2014 edition. However this came short of the 15th place target set by officials who deemed the actual placement as acceptable. Two of the Philippines' gold medal came from golf, while the other two came from weightlifting and skateboarding.

== Background ==
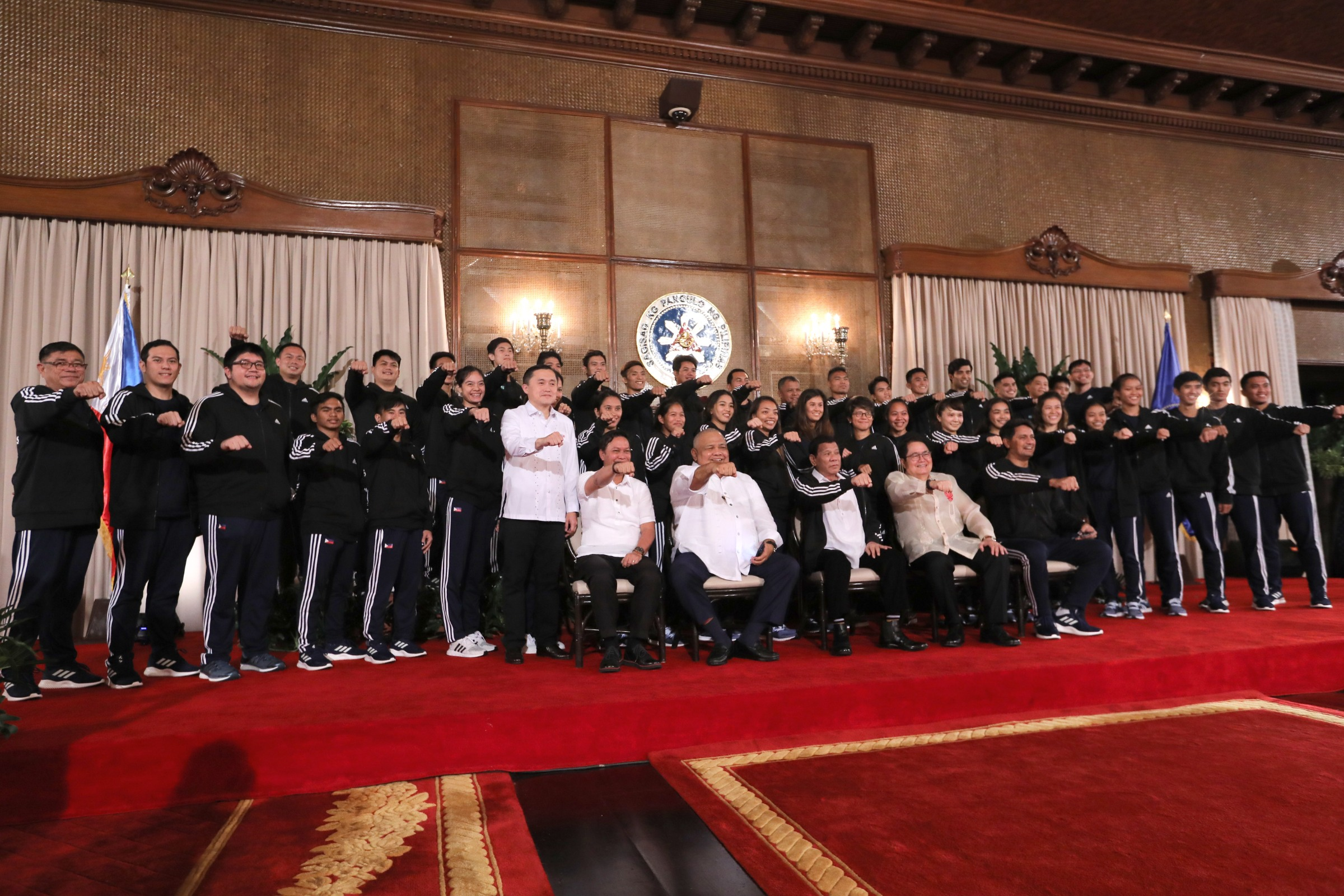
Large portion of the delegation taking a group photo with President Rodrigo Duterte and other government and sports officials after Duterte led the ceremonial send-off of the delegation.

Wushu Federation of the Philippines President Julian Camacho is the chef de mission for the Philippines' stint at the 2018 Asian Games. The Philippine Olympic Committee approved a proposal from Camacho that only gold and silver medalists at the 2017 Southeast Asian Games and medalist of any color from the previous edition of the continental competition would compete in the 2018 Asian Games. Camacho justifying the move stated that he wanted to make sure every athlete can contend for a medal but remained open in including bronze medalists and other athletes to the delegation who can prove their worth by "figuring prominently in Asian-level tournaments" until the deadline of the submission of lineups.

The Philippines plans to send around 200 athletes and it is expected the athletes in contact sports has the best chances of winning medals.

Camacho, who was appointed by the past POC President Peping Cojuangco, filed his courtesy resignation as Chef de Mission in February 2018, following the election of new POC President Ricky Vargas. He was replaced by Richard Gomez, President of the Philippine Fencing Association and then City Mayor of Ormoc, Leyte.

The Philippine Sports Commission on their part expressed willingness to provide around up to ₱200 million for the Philippines' participation in the games. The government agency has also stated that it is willing to financially support "young and potential athletes" who will compete in the games.

The POC has submitted the final list of competing entries by names. A total of 272 national athletes competing in 31 sports will be fielded in for the 2018 Asian Games. 63 officials will also form part of the delegation.

Large part of the delegation attended the send-off ceremony hosted at the Malacañang Palace by President Rodrigo Duterte on August 13, 2018. Basketball player Jordan Clarkson will serve as the flag bearer of the Philippine delegation at the opening ceremony of the games on August 18, 2018 while skateboarder Margielyn Didal will be the flag bearer for the country at the closing ceremony.

== Medalists ==
The following Philippine competitors won medals at the Games.

=== Gold ===
No.	Medal	Name	Sport	Event	Date
1	Gold	Yuka Saso	Golf	Women's Individual	26 Aug
2	Gold	Yuka Saso; Bianca Pagdanganan; Lois Kaye Go	Golf	Women's Team	26 Aug
3	Gold	Margielyn Didal	Roller sports	Women's Street Skateboard	29 Aug
4	Gold	Hidilyn Diaz	Weightlifting	Women's -53kg	21 Aug

=== Silver ===
No.	Medal	Name	Sport	Event	Date
1	Silver	Rogen Ladon	Boxing	Men's Flyweight 52kg	01 Sep
2	Silver	Kiyomi Watanabe	Judo	Women's 63kg	30 Aug

=== Bronze ===
No.	Medal	Name	Sport	Event	Date
1	Bronze	Carlo Paalam	Boxing	Men's Light Flyweight 49kg	31 Aug
2	Bronze	Eumir Felix Marcial	Boxing	Men's Middleweight 75kg	31 Aug
3	Bronze	Daniel Caluag	Cycling	Men's BMX Race	25 Aug
4	Bronze	Bianca Pagdanganan	Golf	Women's Individual	26 Aug
5	Bronze	Margarita Ochoa	Jiu Jitsu	Women's Newaza -49 kg	24 Aug
6	Bronze	Junna Tsukii	Karate	Women's Kumite 50kg	27 Aug
7	Bronze	Jefferson Rhey Loon	Pencak Silat	Men's Class D 60-65kg	26 Aug
8	Bronze	Dines Dumaan	Pencak Silat	Men's Class B 50-55kg	26 Aug
9	Bronze	Cherry May Regalado	Pencak Silat	Women's Individual	27 Aug
10	Bronze	Almohaidib Abad	Pencak Silat	Men's Singles	29 Aug
11	Bronze	Dustin Mella; Jeordan Dominguez; Rodolfo Reyes Jr.	Taekwondo	Men's Team Poomsae	19 Aug
12	Bronze	Janna Oliva; Juvenile Crisostomo; Rinna Babanto	Taekwondo	Women's Team Poomsae	19 Aug
13	Bronze	Pauline Lopez	Taekwondo	Women's -57kg	21 Aug
14	Bronze	Agatha Chrystenzen Wong	Wushu	Women's Taijiquan	20 Aug
15	Bronze	Divine Wally	Wushu	Women's Sanda	22 Aug

=== Multiple ===
Name	Sport	Gold	Silver	Bronze	Total
Yuka Saso	Golf	2	0	0	2
Bianca Pagdanganan	Golf	1	0	1	2

== Medal summary ==
=== Medals by sports ===
Sport	1st place, gold medalist(s)	2nd place, silver medalist(s)	3rd place, bronze medalist(s)	Total
Golf	2	0	1	3
Weightlifting	1	0	0	1
Roller sports	1	0	0	1
Boxing	0	1	2	3
Judo	0	1	0	1
Pencak silat	0	0	4	4
Taekwondo	0	0	3	3
Wushu	0	0	2	2
Cycling	0	0	1	1
Ju-jitsu	0	0	1	1
Karate	0	0	1	1
Total	4	2	15	21

=== Medals by Date ===
Day	Date	1st place, gold medalist(s)	2nd place, silver medalist(s)	3rd place, bronze medalist(s)	Total
1	August 19	0	0	2	2
2	August 20	0	0	1	1
3	August 21	1	0	1	2
4	August 22	0	0	1	1
5	August 23	0	0	0	0
6	August 24	0	0	1	1
7	August 25	0	0	1	1
8	August 26	2	0	3	5
9	August 27	0	0	2	2
10	August 28	0	0	0	0
11	August 29	1	0	1	2
12	August 30	0	1	0	1
13	August 31	0	0	2	2
14	September 1	0	1	0	1
15	September 2	0	0	0	0
Total		4	2	15	21

== Archery ==
=== Compound ===
Athlete	Event	Ranking Round		Round of 64	Round of 32	Round of 16	Quarterfinals	Semifinals	Final	Rank
Athlete	Event	Total Score	Seed	Opposition Score	Opposition Score	Opposition Score	Opposition Score	Opposition Score	Opposition Score	Rank
Paul Marton Dela Cruz	Men's individual compound	692	15	—N/a						
Joseph Benjamin Eduardo Vicencio	Men's individual compound	694	11	—N/a						
Earl Benjamin Yap	Men's individual compound	677	40	—N/a						
Paul Marton Dela Cruz; Joseph Benjamin Eduardo Vicencio; Earl Benjamin Yap	Men's team compound	2063	7	—N/a		Vietnam (VIE); W 227–218	India (IND); L 226–227	Did not Advance		
Amaya Amparo Cojuangco	Women's individual compound	698	7	—N/a						
Amaya Amparo Cojuangco; Paul Marton Dela Cruz	Mixed team compound	1392	5	—N/a	Bye	Bangladesh (BAN); W 154–149	Singapore (SGP); L 147–149	Did not Advance		

=== Recurve ===
Athlete	Event	Ranking Round		Round of 64	Round of 32	Round of 16	Quarterfinals	Semifinals	Final	Rank
Athlete	Event	Total Score	Seed	Opposition Score	Opposition Score	Opposition Score	Opposition Score	Opposition Score	Opposition Score	Rank
Nicole Marie Tagle	Women's individual recurve	589	52	Mst Ety Khatun (BAN); W 6–5	Kang Chaeyoung (KOR); L 2–6	Did not Advance				

== Athletics ==
=== Men's Track ===
Athlete	Event	Qualification			Semifinal			Final	
Athlete	Event	Heat	Result	Rank	SF	Result	Rank	Result	Rank
Trenten Anthony Beram	Men's 200 metres	1	21.14	3 Q	1	21.26	4	Did not Advance	
Trenten Anthony Beram	Men's 400 metres	4	48.06	4 Q	4	47.34	7	Did not Advance	
Marco Vilog	Men's 800 metres	1	1:50.75 (PB)	7				Did not Advance	
Clinton Kingsley Bautista	Men's 110 metres hurdles	2	14.38	4				Did Not Advance	
Eric Cray	Men's 400 metres hurdles				3	50.54	3 q	51.53	7
Francis Medina	Men's 400 metres hurdles				1	51.68	4	Did not Advance	
Anfernee Lopena; Eric Cray; Clinton Kingsley Bautista; Trenten Anthony Beram	Men's 4 × 100 metres relay	1	39.59	5				Did not Advance	

=== Men's Field ===
Athlete	Event	Qualification		Final	
Athlete	Event	Result	Rank	Result	Rank
Janry Ubas	Men's long jump	7.36	16	Did not Advance	
Mark Harry Diones	Men's triple jump			15.72	12
Ernest John Obiena	Men's pole vault			5.30	7

=== Women's Track ===
Athlete	Event	Qualification			Semifinal			Final	
Athlete	Event	Heat	Result	Rank	SF	Result	Rank	Result	Rank
Kristina Marie Knott	Women's 100 metres	2	11.74	4 q	1	11.55	5	Did not Advance	
Kristina Marie Knott	Women's 200 metres	2	23.45 (SB)	3 Q	2	23.65	4 q	23.51	7

=== Women's Field ===
Athlete	Event	Qualification		Final	
Athlete	Event	Result	Rank	Result	Rank
Marestella Sunang	Women's long jump			6.15	9

=== Marathon ===
Athlete	Event	Final	
Athlete	Event	Result	Rank
Mary Joy Tabal	Women's marathon	2:51:41	11

=== Decathlon ===
Athlete	Event	100m	LJ	SP	HJ	400 m	110m H	DT	PV	JV	1500m	Total	Rank
Aries Toledo	Decathlon	10.84 s 897; 2nd	7.21 m 864; 4th	11.07 m 550; 8th	1.88 m 696; 6th	49.07 s 858; 3rd	14.85 s 868; 4th	34.46 m 553; 7th	DNS	–	–	Did Not Finish	

== Basketball ==
2018 Philippines Asian Games basketball team
- Head coach: Yeng Guiao
- 2018 Asian Games: 5th Place

The 2018 Philippines men's Asian Games basketball team, was a Filipino Asian Games team assembled for the basketball competition on 2018 Asian Games.

The basketball association of the Philippines, the Samahang Basketbol ng Pilipinas (SBP) had to come up with an agreement with the Philippine Basketball Association (PBA), the top-tier league in the country so that the Philippines could participate in the men's basketball event of the Asian Games. The two organization had also to consider the national team's stint in the 2019 FIBA Basketball World Cup qualifiers.

The decided against forming a "PBA Selection" team since the PBA Board can't afford to suspend the league for a month and a half. They also considered sending a team of composed of Gilas Cadets or rookie national players along with Andray Blatche though they deemed such team as not competitive enough. They come to a consensus to send a national team largely composed of one PBA team; the TNT KaTropa to aid national team-related scheduling.

The Philippines reportedly will not field a women's team, also will not participate in 3x3, a discipline in basketball that will debut in the 2018 Games. The SBP planned to send a 3x3 team led by AJ Edu and Kobe Paras. They could not send the same squad that participated in the 2018 FIBA 3x3 World Cup since the 3x3 event is restricted to players aged 18 to 23 years old. The plan did not push through due to time constraints.

Summary

Team	Event	Group Stage			Quarterfinal	Classification Round		Rank
Team	Event	Group Stage			Quarterfinal	5−8 Semifinal	5th Place Match	Rank
Team	Event	Opposition Score	Opposition Score	Rank	Opposition Score	Opposition Score	Opposition Score	Rank
Philippines men's	Men's tournament	Kazakhstan; W 96 – 59	China; L 80 – 82	2 QF	South Korea; L 82 – 91	Japan; W 113 – 80	Syria; W 109 – 55	5

=== 5x5 basketball ===
The 12-man line-up of the national men's basketball team was released on June 18, 2018. The line-up is composed by 8 players from TNT KaTropa and 4 players from the Gilas Pilipinas/Gilas Cadets program led by Andray Blatche. However, it did not push through due to suspensions given to some of its players who were involved in the Philippines–Australia basketball brawl. The PBA gave the go signal to the Rain or Shine Elasto Painters to represent the country instead of TNT KaTropa. On 5 August 2018, the Samahang Basketbol ng Pilipinas reversed its decision to withdraw from the Asian Games, as well as announcing their 14-man pool for the continental meet.

The national federation attempted to secure clearance for Cleveland Cavaliers player Jordan Clarkson to play in the Asian Games from the NBA. The NBA initially did not consent and only allowed Clarkson to play for the national team in FIBA-sanctioned tournaments such as the 2010 FIBA World Championship qualifiers. Don Trollano was proposed to be Clarkson's replacement in the official lineup. The NBA later gave Clarkson consent, and issued a statement that he along with two of China's player competing in the Asian Games, Zhou Qi of the Houston Rockets and Ding Yanyuhang of the Dallas Mavericks, were given one-time exception to play in the Asian Games.

==== Men's tournament ====
Roster

The official lineup that will play at the 2018 Asian Games at Jakarta and Palembang, Indonesia.

Philippines men's national basketball team – 2018 Asian Games roster
Players
Coaches
|

Pos.	No.	Name	Age – Date of birth	Height	Club	Ctr.
G	3	Paul Dalistan	29 – February 14, 1989	1.84 m (6 ft 0 in)	Magnolia Hotshots	(Philippines)
G/F	5	Gabe Norwood (C)	33 – February 9, 1985	1.99 m (6 ft 6 in)	Rain or Shine Elasto Painters	(Philippines)
G	6	Jordan Clarkson	26 – June 7, 1992	1.96 m (6 ft 5 in)	Cleveland Cavaliers	(United States)
C	7	John Paul Erram	29 – July 7, 1989	2.02 m (6 ft 8 in)	Blackwater Elite	(Philippines)
G	11	Stanley Pringle	31 – March 4, 1987	1.85 m (6 ft 1 in)	NorthPort Batang Pier	(Philippines)
G	13	Maverick Ahanmisi	27 – July 17, 1991	1.88 m (6 ft 2 in)	Rain or Shine Elasto Painters	(Philippines)
G	17	Chris Tiu	33 – July 15, 1985	1.80 m (5 ft 11 in)	Rain or Shine Elasto Painters	(Philippines)
G/F	18	James Yap	36 – February 15, 1982	1.91 m (6 ft 3 in)	Rain or Shine Elasto Painters	(Philippines)
F/C	20	Raymond Almazan	29 – August 2, 1989	2.02 m (6 ft 8 in)	Rain or Shine Elasto Painters	(Philippines)
F	30	Beau Belga	31 – November 30, 1986	1.98 m (6 ft 6 in)	Rain or Shine Elasto Painters	(Philippines)
F/C	34	Christian Standhardinger	29 – July 4, 1989	2.03 m (6 ft 8 in)	San Miguel Beermen	(Philippines)
C	88	Asi Taulava	45 – March 2, 1973	2.06 m (6 ft 9 in)	NLEX Road Warriors	(Philippines)

Head coach

- (Philippines) Yeng Guiao

Assistant coach(es)

- (Philippines) Caloy Garcia
- (Philippines) Ryan Gregorio

Team manager

Legend

- (C) Team captain
- Club – describes last
  club before the tournament
- Age – describes age
  on August 16, 2018

Preliminary Rounds - Group D

Pos	Team	Pld	W	L	PF	PA	PD	Pts	Qualification
1	China	2	2	0	165	146	+19	4	Quarterfinals
2	Philippines	2	1	1	176	141	+35	3	Quarterfinals
3	Kazakhstan	2	0	2	125	179	−54	2	

Source: OCA

16 August
10:00

Kazakhstan	59–96	Philippines
Scoring by quarter: 9–16, 11–25, 23–20, 16–35
Pts: Bykov 13; Rebs: Gavrilov 8 Asts: Murzagaliyev 6		Pts: Pringle 18; Rebs: Almazan 8 Asts: Tiu 5

Gelora Bung Karno Basketball Hall, Jakarta
Referees: Yuen Chun Yip (HKG), Mohammad Doust (IRI), Jun Horiuchi (JPN)

21 August
16:00

Philippines	80–82	China
Scoring by quarter: 12–20, 19–16, 26–23, 23–23
Pts: Clarkson 28; Rebs: Clarkson, Standhardinger 8 Asts: Clarkson 4		Pts: Zhou 25; Rebs: Zhou 12; Asts: Liu, Sun 5

Gelora Bung Karno Basketball Hall, Jakarta
Referees: Yuen Chun Yip (HKG), Hadi Salem (IRI), Imran Ali Baig (IND)

Quarter-Finals

27 August
10:00

South Korea	91–82	Philippines
Scoring by quarter: 22–18, 20–26, 22–21, 27–17
Pts: Ra 30; Rebs: Ra 14; Asts: Kim S. 10		Pts: Clarkson 25; Rebs: Standhardinger 9 Asts: Lee 5

Gelora Bung Karno Basketball Hall, Jakarta
Referees: Yuen Chun Yip (HKG), Alexey Stepanenko (KAZ), Imran Ali Baig (IND)

5th–8th classification playoffs

28 August
16:00

Philippines	113–80	Japan
Scoring by quarter: 27–27, 30–20, 25–17, 31–16
Pts: Standhardinger 27; Rebs: Standhardinger 13; Asts: Clarkson 9		Pts: Nakamura 16; Rebs: Schafer 8 Asts: Nakamura 11

Gelora Bung Karno Basketball Hall, Jakarta
Referees: Yuen Chun Yip (HKG), Mohammad Doust (IRI), Kim Jong-kuk (KOR)

5th place game

31 August
18:30

Philippines	109–55	Syria
Scoring by quarter: 38–16, 22–18, 31–10, 18–11
Pts: Clarkson 29; Rebs: Standhardinger 15; Asts: Ahanmisi 7		Pts: Al-Jabi 23; Rebs: Al-Hamwi, Al-Osh 6 Asts: Al-Osh 4

Istora Gelora Bung Karno, Jakarta
Referees: Harja Jaladri (INA), Alexey Stepanenko (KAZ), Haryanto Sutaryo (INA)

== Bowling ==
=== Men's event ===
Athlete	Event	Qualification 1st Block		Final 2nd Block	
Athlete	Event	Result	Rank	Result	Rank
Kenneth Chua; Enrico Lorenzo Hernandez; Merwin Matheiu Tan	Men's Trio	2059	13th	4134	10th
Jo Mar Roland Jumapao; Angelo Kenzo Umali; Raoul Miranda	Men's Trio	1856	27th	3777	25th
Kenneth Chua; Enrico Lorenzo Hernandez; Merwin Matheiu Tan; Jo Mar Roland Jumapao; Angelo Kenzo Umali; Raoul Miranda	Men's Team of Six	4054	8th	8027	8th

=== Women's event ===
Athlete	Event	Qualification 1st Block		Final 2nd Block	
Athlete	Event	Result	Rank	Result	Rank
Maria Lourdes Arles; Dyan Arcel Coronacion; Rachelle Leon	Women's Trio	1849	16th	3923	10th
Maria Liza Del Rosario; Marian Lara Posadas; Marie Alexis Sy	Women's Trio	1907	12th	4026	7th
Maria Lourdes Arles; Dyan Arcel Coronacion; Rachelle Leon; Maria Liza Del Rosario; Marian Lara Posadas; Marie Alexis Sy	Women's Team of Six	3916	5th	7951	4th

=== Masters ===
Athlete	Event	Block 1		Block 2		Stepladder Final Round 1	Stepladder Final Round 2
Athlete	Event	Score	Rank	Score	Rank	Opposition Score	Opposition Score
Enrico Lorenzo Hernandez	Men's masters	1807	10	3758	9	Did not advance	
Kenneth Chua	Men's masters	1775	14	3550	16	Did not advance	
Marie Alexis Sy	Women's masters	1846	8	3744	7	Did not advance	
Marian Lara Posadas	Women's masters	1813	10	3593	12	Did not advance	

== Boxing ==
Men

Athlete	Event	Round of 32	Round of 16	Quarterfinals	Semifinals	Final	Rank
Athlete	Event	Opposition Result	Opposition Result	Opposition Result	Opposition Result	Opposition Result	Rank
Carlo Paalam	Light Flyweight (49 kg)	Bye	Tu (TPE); W 5 – 0	Zhussupov (KAZ); W 4 – 1	Amit (IND); L 2 – 3	Did not Advance	3rd place, bronze medalist(s)
Rogen Ladon	Flyweight (52 kg)	Bye	Chaudhary (NEP); W 5 – 0	Mahmetov (KAZ); W 3 – 2	Tongdee (THA); W 5 – 0	Latipov (UZB); L 1 – 3	2nd place, silver medalist(s)
Mario Fernandez	Bantamweight (56 kg)	Al Sudani (IRQ); L KO R2	Did not Advance				
James Palicte	Lightweight (60 kg)	Bye	Abdurasulov (UZB); L 0 – 5	Did not advance			
Joel Bacho	Welterweight (69 kg)	Kazemzadeh Poshtiri (IRI); L 1 – 4	Did not advance				
Eumir Felix Marcial	Middleweight (75 kg)	Bye	Ng (MAC); W RSC R2	Kim (KOR); W 5 – 0	Madrimov (UZB); L 2 – 3	Did not Advance	3rd place, bronze medalist(s)

Women

Athlete	Event	Round of 32	Round of 16	Quarterfinals	Semifinals	Final	Rank
Athlete	Event	Opposition Result	Opposition Result	Opposition Result	Opposition Result	Opposition Result	Rank
Irish Magno	Flyweight (51 kg)	Bye	Pang (PRK); L 0 – 5	Did not advance			
Nesthy Petecio	Featherweight (57 kg)	—N/a	Yin (CHN); L 2 – 3	Did not advance			

== Bridge ==
Athlete	Event	Qualifying Rounds														Semifinals				Final
Athlete	Event	Round 1	Round 2	Round 3	Round 4	Round 5	Round 6	Round 7	Round 8	Round 9	Round 10	Round 11	Round 12	Round 13	Final Rank	Round 1	Round 2	Round 3	Final Rank	Final
Francis Allen Tan; George Soo	Men's Pair	276.00; 33rd	678.00; 30th	1003.70; 29th	1345.90; 31st	—N/a									31st	Did not advance				
Andrew Falcon; Elezar Cabanilla	Men's Pair	361.00; 17th	640.00; 32nd	947.00; 32nd	1245.10; 32nd	—N/a									32nd	Did not advance				
Alberto Quioge; Joseph Roman Maliwat Jr.	Men's Pair	314.30; 31st	738.30; 21st	1164.00; 12th	1444.10; 19th	—N/a									19th	530.00; 15th	780.00; 21st	915.30; 22nd	22nd	Did not advance
Alberto Quioge; Joseph Roman Maliwat Jr. Kong Te Yang; Romulo Virola; Elezar Cabanilla; Andrew Falcon	Men's Team	2.03; 13th	14.81; 12th	27.10; 10th	34.81; 10th	35.65; 11th	51.74; 10th	61.74; 10th	65.16; 10th	73.68; 9th	85.97; 9th	104.84; 8th	112.29; 8th	131.81; 8th	8th	Did not advance				
Gemma Milagros Mariano; Mary Christy Ann De Guzman; Victoria Egan; Francis Allen Tan; George Soo; Francisco Alquiros	Super mixed team	16.66; 2nd	22.27; 5th	30.20; 6th	38.61; 6th	45.41; 7th	51.60; 7th	56.84; 8th	60.18; 9th	66.37; 9th	—N/a				9th	Did not advance				

== Canoeing ==
The Philippine Canoe Kayak Dragonboat Federation will be sending 14 men's and 13 women's at the Games.

=== Sprint ===
Men

Athlete	Event	Heats			Semifinals		Final	
Athlete	Event	Heat	Time	Rank	Time	Rank	Time	Rank
Hermie Macaranas; Ojay Fuentes	C-2 200 m	1	41.441	3 Q	—N/a		38.944	5

=== Traditional boat race ===
Men

Athlete	Event	Heats			Repechage		Semifinals			Final		
Athlete	Event	Heat	Time	Rank	Time	Rank	SF	Time	Rank	Final	Time	Rank
Jordan de Guia; John Lester delos Santos; Franc Feliciano; Mark Jhon Frias; Ojay Fuentes; Hermie Macaranas; Oliver Manaig; Roger Kenneth Masbate; Reymart Nevado; Daniel Ortega; Roberto Pantaleon; John Paul Selencio; Jerome Solis; Christian Urso	200 m	2	53.125	4	52.480	1 Q	2	52.594	3 FA	A	53.580	5
Jordan de Guia; John Lester delos Santos; Franc Feliciano; Mark Jhon Frias; Ojay Fuentes; Hermie Macaranas; Oliver Manaig; Roger Kenneth Masbate; Reymart Nevado; Daniel Ortega; Roberto Pantaleon; John Paul Selencio; Jerome Solis; Christian Urso	500 m	1	2:18.096	2 Q			1	2:17.841	2 FA	A	2:16.521	5
Jordan de Guia; John Lester delos Santos; Franc Feliciano; Mark Jhon Frias; Ojay Fuentes; Hermie Macaranas; Oliver Manaig; Roger Kenneth Masbate; Reymart Nevado; Daniel Ortega; Roberto Pantaleon; John Paul Selencio; Jerome Solis; Christian Urso	1000 m	2	4:48.840	3 Q			2	4:42.951	3 FA	A	4:43.641	6

Women

Athlete	Event	Heats			Repechage		Semifinals			Final		
Athlete	Event	Heat	Time	Rank	Time	Rank	SF	Time	Rank	Final	Time	Rank
Apple Jane Abiton; Raquel Almencion; Lealyn Baligasa; Patricia Ann Bustamante (D); Maribeth Caranto (S); Rosalyn Esguerra; Bernadette Espeña; Glaiza Liwag; Aidelyn Lustre; Sharmane Mangilit; Ma. Theresa Mofar; Rhea Roa; Christine Mae Tolledo	200 m	1	59.441	4	59.632	2 Q	1	59.213	4 FB	B	59.614	8
Apple Jane Abiton; Raquel Almencion; Lealyn Baligasa; Patricia Ann Bustamante (D); Maribeth Caranto (S); Rosalyn Esguerra; Bernadette Espeña; Glaiza Liwag; Aidelyn Lustre; Sharmane Mangilit; Ma. Theresa Mofar; Rhea Roa; Christine Mae Tolledo	500 m	2	2:35.201	5	2:36.408	3 Q	2	2:38.841	5 FB	B	2:38.360	9

== Cycling ==
=== BMX ===
Athlete	Event	Seeding Run		Motos									Final	
Athlete	Event	Time	Rank	Heat	Run 1		Run 2		Run 3		Points	Rank	Time	Rank
Athlete	Event	Time	Rank	Heat	Time	Rank	Time	Rank	Time	Rank	Points	Rank	Time	Rank
Daniel Caluag	Men's BMX race	36.220	5	1	35.191	3	36.007	3	35.150	2	8	2 Q	35.842	3rd place, bronze medalist(s)
Christopher Caluag	Men's BMX race	37.410	10	2	36.056	4	35.993	5	36.299	5	14	5	Did Not Advance	
Sienna Elaine Fines	Women's BMX race	42.750	8	1	42.731	4	42.277	4	43.135	4	12	4 Q	43.663	5

=== Mountain bike ===
Athlete	Event	Lap 1		Lap 2		Lap 3		Lap 4		Lap 5		Lap 6		Final	
Athlete	Event	Time	Rank	Time	Rank	Time	Rank	Time	Rank	Time	Rank	Time	Rank	Time	Rank
Nino Surban	Men's Cross-Country	14:54	15	15:45	16	16:00	16	Did Not Advance						LAP	16
Ariana Thea Patrice Dormitorio	Women's Cross-Country	16:14	2	17:08	4	Did Not Finish									

Athlete	Event	Final	
Athlete	Event	Time	Rank
John Derick Farr	Men's downhill	2:24.547	6
Lea Denise Belgira	Women's downhill	2:55.749	6

== Equestrian ==
Jumping

Athlete	Horse	Event	Qualification		Qualifier 1			Qualifier 2 Team Final			Final round A			Final round B		
Athlete	Horse	Event	Points	Rank	Penalties	Total	Rank	Penalties	Total	Rank	Penalties	Total	Rank	Penalties	Total	Rank
Chiara Sophia Amor	DevonPort 2	Individual	22.27	61	Eliminated			did not advance								
Joker Arroyo	Ubama Alia	Individual	5.52	23	8	13.52	26 Q	8	21.52	27 Q	0	21.52	19 Q	9	30.52	17
Toni Leviste	Maximillian	Individual	7.50	32	1	8.50	17 Q	0	8.50	15 Q	8	16.50	15 Q	0	16.50	11
Chiara Sophia Amor; Joker Arroyo; Toni Leviste	See above	Team	35.29	12	Eliminated			did not advance			—N/a					

== Fencing ==
Athlete	Event	Round of Pool	Round of 32	Round of 16	Quarterfinals	Semifinals	Final	
Athlete	Event	Result	Opposition Score	Opposition Score	Opposition Score	Opposition Score	Opposition Score	Rank
Nathaniel Perez	Men's Individual foil	2W 2L; Q	Zulfika (INA); W 15 – 10	Choi (HKG); L 6 – 15	Did Not Advance			
Brennan Wayne Louie	Men's Individual foil	3W 2L; Q	Chen (TPE); L 13 – 15	Did Not Advance				
Samantha Catantan	Women's Individual foil	3W 2L; Q	Thongchampa (THA); W 15 – 6	Liu (HKG); L 14 – 15	Did Not Advance			
Maxine Esteban	Women's Individual foil	2W 3L; Q	Ho (MAC); W 15 – 9	Azuma (JPN); L 8 – 15	Did Not Advance			
Hanniel Abella	Women's Individual Épée	1W 4L	Did Not Advance					
Michael Nicanor; Nathaniel Perez; Brennan Wayne Louie	Team foil	—N/a	—N/a	Nepal (NEP); W 45 – 3	South Korea (KOR); L 19 – 45	Did Not Advance		
Justine Gail Tinio; Maxine Esteban; Samantha Catantan; Wilhelmina Lozada	Team foil	—N/a	—N/a	Indonesia (INA); W 45 – 19	China (CHN); L 38 – 45	Did Not Advance		

== Gymnastics ==
=== Artistic Gymnastics ===
Men's

Athlete	Event	Qualification								Final							
Athlete	Event	Apparatus						Total	Rank	Apparatus						Total	Rank
Athlete	Event	F	PH	R	V	PB	HB	Total	Rank	F	PH	R	V	PB	HB	Total	Rank
Carlos Edriel Yulo	All-around	14.500	12.550	13.900	13.950	13.800	12.050	80.750	8	—N/a						80.750	8
Carlos Edriel Yulo	Floor Exercise	14.500	—N/a					14.500	1 Q	—N/a						13.500	7
Carlos Edriel Yulo	Pommel Horse	—N/a	12.550	—N/a				12.550	24	Did not advance							
Carlos Edriel Yulo	Rings	—N/a		13.900	—N/a			13.900	18	Did not advance							
Carlos Edriel Yulo	Vault	—N/a			14.150	—N/a		14.150	4 Q	—N/a						13.662	4
Carlos Edriel Yulo	Parallel Bars	—N/a				13.800	—N/a	13.800	14	Did not advance							
Carlos Edriel Yulo	Horizontal Bars	—N/a					12.050	12.050	36	Did not advance							
Jan Gwynn Timbang	All-around	12.300	9.850	11.600	13.700	12.250	11.800	71.500	24	—N/a						71.500	24
Jan Gwynn Timbang	Floor Exercise	12.300	—N/a					12.300	32	Did not advance							
Jan Gwynn Timbang	Pommel Horse	—N/a	9.850	—N/a				9.850	49	Did not advance							
Jan Gwynn Timbang	Rings	—N/a		11.600	—N/a			11.600	49	Did not advance							
Jan Gwynn Timbang	Vault	—N/a			13.700	—N/a		13.700	12	Did no advance							
Jan Gwynn Timbang	Parallel Bars	—N/a				12.250	—N/a	12.250	39	Did not advance							
Jan Gwynn Timbang	Horizontal Bars	—N/a					11.080	11.080	39	Did not advance							
Reyland Capellan
Reyland Capellan	Floor Exercise	13.050	—N/a					13.050	18	Did not advance							
Reyland Capellan	Vault	—N/a			12.825	—N/a		12.825	19	Did not advance							

Women's

Athlete	Event	Qualification						Final					
Athlete	Event	Apparatus				Total	Rank	Apparatus				Total	Rank
Athlete	Event	V	UB	B	F	Total	Rank	V	UB	B	F	Total	Rank
Ma Cristina Onofre	Vault	12.200	—N/a			12.200	18	did not advance					
Ma Cristina Onofre	Floor	—N/a			10.750	10.750	40	did not advance					
Corinne Leanne Bunagan	All-around	13.250	12.300	11.300	12.100	48.950	12	—N/a				48.950	12
Corinne Leanne Bunagan	Uneven Bars	—N/a	12.300	—N/a		12.300	15	did not advance					
Corinne Leanne Bunagan	Balance Beam	—N/a		11.300	—N/a	11.300	33	did not advance					
Corinne Leanne Bunagan	Floor	—N/a			12.100	12.100	18	did not advance					

=== Rhythmic Gymnastics ===
Individual all-around

Athlete	Qualification						Final					
Athlete	Rope	Hoop	Clubs	Ribbon	Total	Rank	Rope	Hoop	Clubs	Ribbon	Total	Rank
Marian Nicole Medina	8.950	9.550	8.300	5.950	28.800	28 Q	10.750	9.200	8.450	8.750	37.150	23
Shieldannah Sabio	9.00	8.00	9.65	7.25	26.650	29	Did not Advance					

=== Trampoline Gymnastics ===
Athlete	Event	Qualification		Final	
Athlete	Event	Score	Rank	Score	Rank
Deorelar Francisco	Men's Individual	—N/a			
Luvicar Janine Padilla	Women's Individual	—N/a			

== Golf ==
Men

Athlete	Event	Round 1	Round 2	Round 3	Round 4	Total	Par	Rank
Ruperto Zaragosa III	Individual	77	73	67	69	286	–2	13
Lloyd Jefferson Go	Individual	74	71	71	69	285	–3	10
Gao Weiwei	Individual	72	67	77	80	296	+8	35
Luis Miguel Castro	Individual	78	71	78	80	307	+19	51
Ruperto Zaragosa III; Lloyd Jefferson Go; Gao Weiwei; Luis Miguel Castro	Team	223	209	215	218	865	+1	8

Women

Athlete	Event	Round 1	Round 2	Round 3	Round 4	Total	Par	Rank
Yuka Saso	Individual	71	69	69	66	275	–13	1st place, gold medalist(s)
Bianca Isabel Pagdanganan	Individual	72	70	71	66	279	–9	3rd place, bronze medalist(s)
Lois Kaye Go	Individual	72	72	75	73	292	+4	17
Yuka Saso; Bianca Isabel Pagdanganan; Lois Kaye Go	Team	143	139	140	132	554	–22	1st place, gold medalist(s)

== Jet ski ==
Athlete	Event	Finals								Rank
Athlete	Event	Moto 1		Moto 2		Moto 3		Moto 4		Rank
Athlete	Event	Result	Rank	Result	Rank	Result	Rank	Result	Rank	Rank
Billy Jean Ang	Roundabout 1100 Stock	Did Not Race		Did Not Race		Did Not Race		0	0	12th
Billy Jean Ang	Endurance Runabout Open	324	12	328	11	332	10	—N/a		10th

== Judo ==
The Philippines will participate in Judo at the Games with 5 athletes (2 men's and 3 women's):

Men

Athlete	Event	Round of 32	Round of 16	Quarterfinals	Semifinals	Repechage	Final/BM	Rank
Athlete	Event	Opposition Result	Opposition Result	Opposition Result	Opposition Result	Opposition Result	Opposition Result	Rank
Shugen Nakano	66 kg	Chong (MAS); W IPP 10 – 0	Zhumakanov (KAZ); L IPP 0 – 10	Did not advance				
Keisei Nakano	73 kg	Younis (JOR); W 01 - 0	Mohammadi (IRN); L IPP 0 – 10	Did not advance				
Kohei Kohagura	81 kg	—N/a						

Women

Athlete	Event	Round of 32	Round of 16	Quarterfinals	Semifinals	Repechage	Final/BM	Rank
Athlete	Event	Opposition Result	Opposition Result	Opposition Result	Opposition Result	Opposition Result	Opposition Result	Rank
Megumi Kurayoshi	57 kg	Bye	Leung (HKG); L IPP 0 – 10	Did not advance				
Kiyomi Watanabe	63 kg	—N/a	Bye	Senatham (THA); W IPP 10 – 0	Bold (MGL); W 1s1 - 0	—N/a	Nabekura (JPN); L IPP 0 – 10	2nd place, silver medalist(s)
Mariya Takahashi	70 kg	—N/a	Thongsri (THA); W IPP 10 – 0	Kim (KOR); L IPP 0 – 11	Did not advance	Naranjargal (MGL); L IPP 0 – 10	Did not advance	

== Ju-Jitsu ==
Men

Athlete	Event	1/16 Finals	1/8 Finals	1/4 Finals	Final of Tables	Final/BM	Rank
Athlete	Event	Opposition Result	Opposition Result	Opposition Result	Opposition Result	Opposition Result	Rank
Jan Vincent Cortez	56 kg	Seiduali (KAZ); L SUB 0 – 100	Did not advance				
Gian Taylor Dee	56 kg	Bye	Ulziitogtokh (MGL); L ADV 0 – 0	Did not advance			
Eros Vincent Baluyot	62 kg	—N/a					
Erwin John Tagle	62 kg	—N/a					
Marc Alexander Lim	69 kg	Lertthaisong (THA); L ADV 0 – 0	Did not advance				
Adrian Rodolfo Erwin Guggenheim	77 kg	Suntra (THA); W 4 – 0	Alhammadi (UAE); L 0 – 2	Did not advance			
Carlos Angelo Pena	62 kg	Chua (SGP); W 10 – 0	Nortayev (KAZ); L 0 – 2	Did not advance			

Women

Athlete	Event	1/16 Finals	1/8 Finals	1/4 Finals	Final of Tables	Final/BM	Rank
Athlete	Event	Opposition Result	Opposition Result	Opposition Result	Opposition Result	Opposition Result	Rank
Margarita Ochoa	49 kg	Alkhatib (JOR); W ADV 0 – 0	Deepudsa (THA); W 2 – 0	Duong (VIE); L ADV 0 – 0	Munkhgerel (MGL); W SUB 100 – 0	Bronze Medal Match; Napolis (PHI); W 2 – 0	3rd place, bronze medalist(s)
Kaila Napolis	49 kg	—N/a	Savitri (INA); W SUB 100 – 0	Alyafei (UAE); W SUB 0 –– 0	Khan (CAM); L ADV 0 – 0	Bronze Medal Match; Ochoa (PHI); L 0 – 2	4th
Apryl Jessica Eppinger	62 kg	Sangsirichok (THA); L 0 – 3	Did not advance				
Annie Ramirez	62 kg	Sung (KOR); L 0 – 21	Did not advance				

== Karate ==
=== Men ===
Athlete	Event	1/8 Finals	Quarterfinals	Repechage	Semifinals	Finals	Rank
Athlete	Event	Opposition Result	Opposition Result	Opposition Result	Opposition Result	Opposition Result	Rank
Orencio James Virgil de los Santos	Individual Kata	Bye	Kuok (MAC); L 0 – 5	Did not advance			
Jayson Ramil Macaalay	Kumite -60kg	Ng (MAC); W 3 – 0	Zadeh (IRI); L 0 – 6	Repechage Contest; Nguyen (VIE); L 0 – 4	Did not advance		
Rexor Tacay	Kumite -67kg	—N/a					
Afif M. Sharief	Kumite -84kg	Ryutaro (JPN); L 8 – 0	—N/a	Wu (TPE); L 6 – 0	Did not advance		

=== Women ===
Athlete	Event	1/8 Finals	Quarterfinals	Bronze medal match	Rank
Athlete	Event	Opposition Result	Opposition Result	Opposition Result	Rank
Junna Tsukii	Kumite -50kg	Bakhriniso Babaeva (UZB); L 2 – 1	—N/a	Paweena Raksachart (THA); W 4 – 1	3rd place, bronze medalist(s)
Mae Soriano	Kumite -55kg	Alshawabkeh (JOR); W 2 – 1	Wong (MAC); L 1 – 3	Did not advance	

== Kurash ==
Men

Athlete	Event	Round of 32	Round of 16	Quarterfinal	Semifinal	Final	Rank
Athlete	Event	Opposition Result	Opposition Result	Opposition Result	Opposition Result	Opposition Result	Rank
Al Rolan Llamas	Men's -66kg	Razi (PAK); W 10 – 0	Gaybulloev (UZB); L 0 – 10	Did not advance			
Lloyd Dennis Catipon	Men's -81kg	Ardiarta (INA); L 0 – 10	Did not advance				
Jason Balabal	Men's -90kg	Bye	Begaliyev (TKM); L 0 – 10	Did not advance			
Christof Hofmann Jr.	Men's +90kg	Kuralov (KGZ); L 0 – 10	Did not advance				

Women

Athlete	Event	Round of 32	Round of 16	Quarterfinal	Semifinal	Final	Rank
Athlete	Event	Opposition Result	Opposition Result	Opposition Result	Opposition Result	Opposition Result	Rank
Helen Dawa	Women's -52kg	Jadhav (IND); L 0 – 3	Did not advance				
Grace Loberanes	Women's -52kg	Bye	Susanti (INA); L 0 – 10	Did not advance			
Jenielou Mosqueda	Women's -63kg	Bayarbat (MGL); L 0 – 3	Did not advance				
Noemi Tener	Women's -63kg	Shermetova (UZB); L 0 – 10	Did not advance				

== Pencak Silat ==
Athlete	Event	Round of 16	Quarterfinal	Semifinal	Final	Rank
Dines Dumaan	Men's Class B 50-55 kg	Bye	Boynao Singh Naorem (IND); W 5 – 0	Muhammad Faizul M Nasir (MAS); L 0 – 5	Did not advance	3rd place, bronze medalist(s)
Jefferson Rhey Loon	Men's Class D 60-65 kg	Mateus Da Silva Conceição (TLS); W 5 – 0	Almazbek Zamirov (KGZ); W 4 – 0	Nguyen Ngoc Toan (VIE); L 0 – 5	Did not advance	3rd place, bronze medalist(s)
Alvin Campos	Men's Class E 65-70 kg	Mohd Al Jufferi Jamari (MAS); L 0 – 5	Did not advance			
Princesslyn Enopia	Women's Class B 50-55 kg	Bye	Olathai Sounthavong (LAO); L 0 – 5	Did not advance		
Precious Jade Borre	Women's Class C 55-60 kg	Bye	Hoang Thi loan (VIE); L 0 – 5	Did not advance		

Athlete	Event	Qualification		Final	
Athlete	Event	Result	Rank	Result	Rank
Almohaidib Abad	Men's Single	452	3 Q	455	3rd place, bronze medalist(s)
Cherry May Regalado	Women's Single	447	2 Q	444	3rd place, bronze medalist(s)
Almohaidib Abad; Alfau Jan Abad	Men's Double	—N/a		545	6
Almohaidib Abad; Alfau Jan Abad; James El Mayagma	Men's Team	—N/a		436	6

== Roller sports ==
=== Skateboard ===
==== Men's ====
Athlete	Event	Preliminary		Finals	
Athlete	Event	Result	Rank	Result	Rank
Jeffrey Gonzales	Men's Street	16.2	13	Did not advance	
Renzo Mark Feliciano	Men's Street	10.4	17	Did not advance	

==== Women's ====
Athlete	Event	Preliminary		Finals	
Athlete	Event	Result	Rank	Result	Rank
Margielyn Didal	Women's Street	—N/a		30.4	1st place, gold medalist(s)

== Sailing ==
Team	Event	Race															Total	Rank
Team	Event	1	2	3	4	5	6	7	8	9	10	11	12	13	14	15	Total	Rank
Geylord Coveta	Men's RS:X	8	8	7	9	7	7	7	7	7	8	6	7	5	7	8	108	7
Lester Troy Tayong; Emerson Villena	Men's 470	6	6	7	6	7	5	4	3	4	3	3	6	—N/a			60	6
Yancy Kaibigan	—N/a																	

== Softball ==
The Philippines women's national softball team qualified for the Asian Games by finishing second in the 2017 Asian Women's Softball Championship.

Summary

Team	Group Stage							Semifinals / Pl.	Final / BM	Grand Final / GM	Rank
Team	Opposition Score	Opposition Score	Opposition Score	Opposition Score	Opposition Score	Opposition Score	Rank	Opposition Score	Opposition Score	Opposition Score	Rank
Philippines Women's	Hong Kong; W 7 – 0	South Korea; W 5 – 3	China; W 1 – 0	Japan; L 1 – 11	Indonesia; W 4 – 0	Chinese Taipei; L 2 – 3	3rd	Chinese Taipei; L 3 – 6	Did Not Advance		4th

=== Preliminary round ===
Final round
Eliminated

The top four teams will advance to the Final round.

Team	W	L	RS	RA	WIN%	GB	Tiebreaker
Japan	6	0	59	3	1.000	–	
China	4	2	30	16	0.667	2	1–1; RA = 1
Philippines	4	2	'20	17	0.667	2	1–1; RA = 3
Chinese Taipei	4	2	27	13	0.667	2	1–1; RA = 7
South Korea	2	4	15	23	0.333	4	
Indonesia	0	5	2	41	0.000	5.5	
Hong Kong	0	5	2	42	0.000	5.5	

August 19; 20:00	Philippines	7–0	Hong Kong	GBK Softball field
August 19; 20:00		Boxscore		GBK Softball field

August 20; 15:00	South Korea	3–5	Philippines	GBK Softball field
August 20; 15:00		Boxscore		GBK Softball field

August 20; 20:00	China	0–1	Philippines	GBK Softball field
August 20; 20:00		Boxscore		GBK Softball field

August 21; 17:30	Philippines	1–11	Japan	GBK Softball field
August 21; 17:30		Boxscore		GBK Softball field

August 22; 12:30	Philippines	4–0	Indonesia	GBK Softball field
August 22; 12:30		Boxscore		GBK Softball field

August 22; 20:00	Philippines	2–3	Chinese Taipei	GBK Softball field
August 22; 20:00		Boxscore		GBK Softball field

=== Semi-finals ===
August 23; 18:00	Philippines	3–6	Chinese Taipei	GBK Softball field
August 23; 18:00		Boxscore		GBK Softball field

== Sepak takraw ==
Men

Athlete	Event	Group Stage				Semifinal	Final	
Athlete	Event	Opposition score	Opposition score	Opposition score	Rank	Opposition score	Opposition score	Rank
Joeart Jumawan; Rheyjey Ortouste; Alvin Pangan; Ronsited Gabayeron; Emmanuel Escote	Regu	Indonesia (INA); L 0–2	Singapore (SGP); L 1–2	Pakistan (PAK); W 2–0	3	Did not advance		
Joeart Jumawan; Rheyjey Ortouste; Alvin Pangan; Joshua Bullo; John Jeffrey Morcillos; Emmanuel Escote; John-John Bobier; John Carlo Lee; Reznan Pabriga	Team doubles	Vietnam (VIE); W 2–1	Indonesia (INA); L 1–2	Japan (JPN); L 1–2	3	Did not advance		

== Shooting ==
Men

Athlete	Event	1st Qualification		2nd Qualification		Final	
Athlete	Event	Score	Rank	Score	Rank	Score	Rank
Jayson Valdez	10m air rifle	618.6	17th	—N/a		Did Not Advance	
Jayson Valdez	50m rifle 3 positions	1142	20th	—N/a		Did Not Advance	
Hagen Alexander Topacio	Trap	71	3rd	118	5th Q	18	6th
Joaquin Miguel Ancheta	Skeet	64	26th	107	26th	Did not advance	

Women

Athlete	Event	Qualification		Final	
Athlete	Event	Score	Rank	Score	Rank
Amparo Teresa Acuna	50m rifle 3 positions	1129	26th	Did Not Advance	
Amparo Teresa Acuna	10m air rifle	603.7	40th	Did Not Advance	

== Soft tennis ==
Athlete	Event	Round Group			Quarterfinals	Semifinals	Final	Rank
Athlete	Event	Match 1	Match 2	Match 3	Quarterfinals	Semifinals	Final	Rank
Athlete	Event	Opposition Result	Opposition Result	Opposition Result	Opposition Result	Opposition Result	Opposition Result	Rank
Joseph Arcilla	Men´s Singles	So (PRK); L 1 – 4	Leampriboom (THA); L 3 – 4	—N/a	Did not advance			
Noel Damian Jr.	Men´s Singles	Kim (KOR); L 0 – 4	Enkhbaatar (MGL); W 4 – 3	—N/a	Did not advance			
Joseph Arcilla; Noel Damian Jr. Mark Anthony Alcoseba; Mikoff Manduriao; Vince Carlo Ramiscal	Men's Team	Laos (LAO); W 2 – 1	Pakistan (PAK); W 2 – 1	South Korea (KOR); L 0 – 3	Chinese Taipei (TPE); L 0 – 2	Did not advance		
Noelle Conchita Corazon Manalac	Women´s Singles	Zaidi (PAK); W 4 – 0	Kim (PRK); L 3 – 4	—N/a	Did not advance			
Princess Lorben Catindig	Women´s Singles	Srirungreang (THA); L 2 – 4	Bataa (MGL); W 4 – 0	—N/a	Did not advance			
Noelle Conchita Corazon Manalac; Princess Lorben Catindig; Odessa Mariel Arzaga; Jamaica Daquio; Khyshana Athena Hitosis	Women's Team	China (CHN); L 0 – 3	Chinese Taipei (TPE); L 0 – 3	—N/a	Did not advance			
Mark Anthony Alcoseba; Princess Lorben Catindig	Mixed Doubles	Anugerah (INA); Darina (INA); L 4 – 5	Kim (PRK); So (PRK); L 2 – 5	Lam (VIE); Tran (VIE); W 5 – 2	Did not advance			
Noel Damian Jr. Noelle Conchita Corazon Manalac	Mixed Doubles	Orn (CAM); Rin (CAM); W 5 – 1	Leampriboon (THA); Bunteng (THA); L 0 – 5	—N/a	Did not advance			

== Sport climbing ==
Speed

Athlete	Event	Qualification		Round of 16	Quarterfinals	Semifinals	Final / BM	
Athlete	Event	Best	Rank	Opposition Time	Opposition Time	Opposition Time	Opposition Time	Rank
Gerald Verosil	Men's	7.959	19	Did not advance				

Combined

Athlete	Event	Qualification					Final				
Athlete	Event	Speed Point	Boulder Point	Lead Point	Total	Rank	Speed Point	Boulder Point	Lead Point	Total	Rank
Gerald Verosil	Men's	18	15	21	5670	19	Did not advance				

== Squash ==
Men

Athlete	Event	Round of 32	Round of 16	Quarterfinals	Semifinals	Final	Rank
Athlete	Event	Opposition Score	Opposition Score	Opposition Score	Opposition Score	Opposition Score	Rank
Robert Andrew Garcia	Singles	Leong Yew Sing Timothy (SGP); W 3 – 0	Harinder Pal Sandhu (IND); L 1 – 3	Did not advance			
David William Pelino	Singles	Ammar Altamimi (KUW); L 0 – 3	Did not advance				

Women

Athlete	Event	Round of 32	Round of 16	Quarterfinals	Semifinals	Final	Rank
Athlete	Event	Opposition Score	Opposition Score	Opposition Score	Opposition Score	Opposition Score	Rank
Jemyca Aribado	Singles	Hadis Farzad (IRI); W 3 – 1	Joshana Chinappa (IND); L 0 – 3	Did not advance			
Yvonne Alyssa Dalida	Singles	Uyanga Amarmend (MGL); W 3 – 0	Au Wing Chi Annie (HKG); L 0 – 3	Did not advance			

Team

Athlete	Event	Qualification				Semifinals	Final	Rank
Athlete	Event	Match 1	Match 2	Match 3	Match 4	Semifinals	Final	Rank
Athlete	Event	Opposition Result	Opposition Result	Opposition Result	Opposition Result	Opposition Result	Opposition Result	Rank
Reymark Begornia; Lydio Espinola Jr. Robert Andrew Garcia; David William Pelino	Men´s Team	Hong Kong (HKG); L 0 – 3	South Korea (KOR); L 1 – 2	Pakistan (PAK); L 0 – 3	—N/a	Did not advance		
Jemyca Aribado; Regina Ma Cristina Borromeo; Yvonne Alyssa Dalida; Andrea Candace Jemiolo	Women´s Team	Japan (JPN); L 0 – 3	Malaysia (MAS); L 0 – 3	South Korea (KOR); L 1 – 2	Pakistan (PAK); W 2 – 1	Did not advance		

== Swimming ==
=== Men ===
Athlete	Event	Heats		Final	
Athlete	Event	Time	Rank	Time	Rank
Archimedes Lim	—N/a				

=== Women ===
Athlete	Event	Heats		Final	
Athlete	Event	Time	Rank	Time	Rank
Jasmine Alkhaldi	50 m freestyle	26.20	12th	Did not advance	
Jasmine Alkhaldi	100 m freestyle	56.38	6th Q	56.29	7th
Jasmine Alkhaldi	200 m freestyle	2:02.53	7th Q	2:03.24	8th
Jasmine Alkhaldi	100 m Butterfly	1:01.04	10th	Did not advance	
Roxanne Ashley Yu	100 m Backstroke	1:05.10	12th	Did not advance	
Roxanne Ashley Yu	200 m Backstroke	2:19.12	8th Q	2:21.25	8th
Chloe Kennedy Anne Isleta	—N/a				

== Table tennis ==
Athlete	Event	Round of 64	Round of 32	Round of 16	Quarterfinals	Semifinals	Final / BM	
Athlete	Event	Opposition Result	Opposition Result	Opposition Result	Opposition Result	Opposition Result	Opposition Result	Rank
Jann Mari Nayre	Men's Singles	Gubran (YEM); W 4 – 0	Wong (HKG); L 1 – 4	Did not advance				

== Taekwondo ==
=== Poomsae ===
Athlete	Event	Round of 16	Quarterfinal	Semifinal	Final	
Athlete	Event	Opposition score	Opposition score	Opposition score	Opposition score	Rank
Rodolfo Reyes	Men's individual	Ruslan Manaspayev (KAZ); W 8.08–7.08	Pongporn Suvittayarak (THA); L 8.08–8.32	Did not advance		
Dustin Mella; Jeordan Dominguez; Rodolfo Reyes	Men's team	Saudi Arabia; W 8.18–7.64	Iran; W 8.33–8.10	China; L 7.83–8.18	Did not advance	3rd place, bronze medalist(s)
Jocel Lyn Ninobla	Women's individual	Châu Tuyết Vân (VIE); L 7.89–8.11	Did not advance			
Juvenile Crisostomo; Rinna Babanto; Janna Oliva	Women's team	Hong Kong; W 8.00–7.49	Indonesia; W 8.07–8.04	South Korea; L 7.11–8.02	Did not advance	3rd place, bronze medalist(s)

=== Kyorugi ===
Athlete	Event	Round of 32	Round of 16	Quarterfinal	Semifinal	Final	
Athlete	Event	Opposition score	Opposition score	Opposition score	Opposition score	Opposition score	Rank
Jenar Torillos	Men's −58 kg	Chen Xiaoyi (CHN); L 26 – 27	Did not advance				
Francis Aaron Agojo	Men's −63 kg	Ahmed Dghbas (QAT); W 41 – 28	Mirhashem Hosseini (IRI); L 2 – 24	Did not advance			
Arven Alcantara	Men's −68 kg	Bye	Abdulla Al-Ahmed (BRN); W 44 – 11	Lee Daehoon (KOR); L 26 – 5	Did not advance		
Samuel Morrison	Men's −80 kg	Bye	Farkhod Negmatov (TJK); W 19 – 17	Lee Hwajun (KOR); L 18 – 27	Did not advance		
Kristopher Uy	Men's +80 kg	—N/a	Sun Hongyi (CHN); L 7 – 9	Did not advance			
Jessica Canabal	Women's −49 kg	Bye	Ainur Yesbergenova (KAZ); W 18 – 17	Nahid Kiyanichandeh (IRI); L 15 – 23	Did not advance		
Rhezie Aragon	Women's −53 kg	Bye	Elaheh Sheidaei (IRI); L 2 – 10	Did not advance			
Pauline Lopez	Women's −57 kg	Bye	Feng Xiao (MAC); W 8 – 0	Gyani Chunara (NEP); W 20 – 0	Luo Zongshi (CHN); L 4 – 11	Did not advance	3rd place, bronze medalist(s)
Darlene Arpon	Women's −67 kg	—N/a	Sangita Basyel (NEP); W 20 – 17	Kim Jandi (KOR); L 0 – 29	Did not advance		
Kirstie Alora	Women's +67 kg	—N/a	Cansel Deniz (KAZ); L 7 – 8	Did not advance			

== Tennis ==
Athlete	Event	Round of 64	Round of 32	Round of 16	Quarterfinals	Semifinals	Final
Athlete	Event	Opposition Result	Opposition Result	Opposition Result	Opposition Result	Opposition Result	Opposition Result
Jeson Patrombon	Men's singles	Fernandes Gusmao Nazario (TLS); W 6 – 1, 6 – 0	Wu Yibing (CHN); L 1 – 6, 2 – 6	Did not advance			
Alberto Lim Jr.	Men's singles	Bye	Zhang Zhizhen (CHN); L 4 – 6, 2 – 6	Did not advance			
Francis Casey Alcantara; Jeson Patrombon	Men's doubles	Jabor Almutawa (QAT); Mubarak Zayid (QAT); W 6 – 4, 6 – 2	Ti Chen (TPE); Peng Hsienyin (TPE); L 6 – 4, 6(5) – 7, [7] – 10	Did not advance			
Marian Jade Capadocia	Women's singles	Bye	Eri Hozumi (JPN); L 1 – 6, 3 – 6	Did not advance			
Katharina Lehnert; Marian Jade Capadocia	Women's doubles	—N/a	Gozal Ainitdinova (KAZ); Anna Danilina (KAZ); L 5 – 7, 5 – 7	Did not advance			
Katharina Lehnert; Francis Casey Alcantara	Mixed doubles	Bye	Nicha Lertpitaksinchain (THA); Sanchai Ratiwana (THA); L 0 – 6, 2 – 6	Did not advance			
Marian Jade Capadocia; Alberto Lim Jr.	Mixed doubles	Bye	Kamran Kaur Thandi (IND); Divij Sharan (IND); L 4 – 6, 4 – 6	Did not advance			

== Triathlon ==
Athlete	Event	Swim (1.5 km)		Trans 1			Bike (40 km)			Trans 2			Run (10 km)		Total	Rank
Athlete	Event	Time	Swim Rank	Time	Transfer Rank	Overall Rank	Time	Bike Rank	Overall Rank	Time	Transfer Rank	Overall Rank	Time	Run Rank	Total	Rank
Nikko Bryan Huelgas	Men's Individual	21:37	23	0:29	21	25	56:15	3	20	0:24	13	19	39:54	20	1:58:39	16
John Leerams Chicano	Men's Individual	21:39	25	0:30	23	26	56:10	1	18	0:27	24	20	35:47	11	1:54:33	10
Marion Kim Mangrobang	Women's Individual	20:18	7	0:28	7	7	1:02:06	6	9	0:24	7	11	42:04	7	2:05:20	7
Kimberly Michelle Kilgroe	Women's Individual	21:44	14	0:27	3	14	1:00:37	2	2	0:23	5	2	43:46	9	2:06:57	9
Ma Claire Adorna	Mixed relay	4:18	4	0:47	8	5	10:52	3	4	0:39	6	6	8:13	7	24:49	6
John Leerams Chicano	Mixed relay	4:50	9	0:43	7	9	10:34	7	6	0:39	8	6	7:02	7	23:48	6
Marion Kim Mangrobang	Mixed relay	5:03	6	0:51	8	6	11:46	7	6	0:38	4	6	7:27	5	25:45	6
Mark Anthony Hosana	Mixed relay	4:48	9	0:46	11	9	11:12	10	10	0:38	8	10	7:22	11	24:46	6

== Volleyball ==
The Philippines participated in women's volleyball at the 2018 Asian Games. The final 14-player squad was announced on June 14, 2018.

=== Indoor volleyball ===
Team	Event	Group Stage					Quarterfinal	Classification Round		Rank
Team	Event	Group Stage					Quarterfinal	5−8 Semifinal	7th Place Match	Rank
Team	Event	Group Stage					Quarterfinal	Opposition Score	Opposition Score	Rank
Philippines Women's	Women's tournament	Thailand; L 0–3	Japan; L 0–3	Hong Kong; W' 3–0	Indonesia; L 1–4	4 Q	China; L 0–4	Kazakhstan; L 2–3	Indonesia; L 1–3	8

==== Women's tournament ====
Team roster

The following is the Philippines roster in the women's volleyball tournament of the 2018 Asian Games.

Head coach: Shaq Delos Santos

No.	Name	Date of birth	Height	Weight	Spike	Block	Club
2	Alyssa Valdez	29 June 1993	1.75 m (5 ft 9 in)	60 kg (130 lb)	305 cm (120 in)	282 cm (111 in)	(Philippines) Creamline Cool Smashers
3	Jaja Santiago	20 January 1996	1.96 m (6 ft 5 in)	65 kg (143 lb)	320 cm (130 in)	302 cm (119 in)	(Philippines) Foton Tornadoes
5	Dawn Macandili (L)	31 May 1996	1.53 m (5 ft 0 in)	50 kg (110 lb)	246 cm (97 in)	234 cm (92 in)	(Philippines) F2 Logistics Cargo Movers
6	Mylene Paat	5 April 1994	1.80 m (5 ft 11 in)	66 kg (146 lb)	285 cm (112 in)	274 cm (108 in)	(Philippines) Cignal HD Spikers
8	Mika Aereen Reyes	21 June 1994	1.83 m (6 ft 0 in)	61 kg (134 lb)	283 cm (111 in)	279 cm (110 in)	(Philippines) Petron Blaze Spikers
9	Kim Fajardo	30 September 1993	1.70 m (5 ft 7 in)	59 kg (130 lb)	275 cm (108 in)	265 cm (104 in)	(Philippines) F2 Logistics Cargo Movers
10	Maika Angela Ortiz	30 August 1991	1.78 m (5 ft 10 in)	70 kg (150 lb)	290 cm (110 in)	295 cm (116 in)	(Philippines) Foton Tornadoes
11	Charleen Abigaile Cruz-Behag	11 May 1988	1.72 m (5 ft 8 in)	60 kg (130 lb)	287 cm (113 in)	264 cm (104 in)	(Philippines) F2 Logistics Cargo Movers
12	Julia Melissa Morado	10 May 1995	1.68 m (5 ft 6 in)	54 kg (119 lb)			(Philippines) Creamline Cool Smashers
13	Denden Lazaro	21 January 1992	1.65 m (5 ft 5 in)	56 kg (123 lb)	251 cm (99 in)	247 cm (97 in)	(Philippines) Cocolife Asset Managers
14	Mary Joy Baron	10 December 1995	1.81 m (5 ft 11 in)	59 kg (130 lb)	287 cm (113 in)	272 cm (107 in)	(Philippines) F2 Logistics Cargo Movers
15	Kim Kianna Dy	26 July 1995	1.80 m (5 ft 11 in)	57 kg (126 lb)	280 cm (110 in)	270 cm (110 in)	(Philippines) F2 Logistics Cargo Movers
16	Dindin Santiago-Manabat	26 September 1993	1.91 m (6 ft 3 in)	65 kg (143 lb)	284 cm (112 in)	270 cm (110 in)	(Philippines) Foton Tornadoes
18	Abigail Maraño (C)	22 December 1992	1.75 m (5 ft 9 in)	54 kg (119 lb)	280 cm (110 in)	280 cm (110 in)	(Philippines) F2 Logistics Cargo Movers

Pool A

Pos	Team	Pld	W	L	Pts	SW	SL	SR	SPW	SPL	SPR	Qualification
1	Thailand	4	4	0	12	12	1	12.000	322	221	1.457	Quarterfinals
2	Japan	4	3	1	9	9	3	3.000	290	197	1.472	Quarterfinals
3	Indonesia	4	2	2	6	7	8	0.875	315	328	0.960	Quarterfinals
4	Philippines	4	1	3	3	4	9	0.444	260	310	0.839	Quarterfinals
5	Hong Kong	4	0	4	0	1	12	0.083	190	321	0.592	Classification for 9–11

Source: OCA

Date	Time		Score		Set 1	Set 2	Set 3	Set 4	Set 5	Total	Report
19 Aug	12:30	Philippines	0–3	Thailand	22–25	12–25	15–25			49–75	Report
21 Aug	16:30	Philippines	0–3	Japan	12–25	15–25	21–25			48–75	Report
23 Aug	12:30	Hong Kong	0–3	Philippines	18–25	21–25	22–25			61–75	Report
25 Aug	19:00	Indonesia	3–1	Philippines	25–20	25–20	24–26	25–22		99–88	Report
29 Aug	19:00	Philippines	0–3	China	15–25	9–25	7–25			31–75	Report
31 Aug	14:30	Philippines	2–3	Kazakhstan	11–25	25–22	15–25	25–19	14–16	90–107	Report
01 Sep	10:00	Indonesia	3–1	Philippines	25–17	23–25	25–19	25–20		98–81	Report

== Weightlifting ==
The Philippine Olympic Committee has allocated a quota of two women weightlifters but the national weightlifting association, the Samahang Weightlifting ng Pilipinas has appealed the POC to allow a total of seven athletes to compete who have qualified under the Asian Games standard.

=== Men's events ===
Athlete	Event	Snatch			Clean & Jerk			Total	Rank
Athlete	Event	Attempt 1	Attempt 2	Attempt 3	Attempt 1	Attempt 2	Attempt 3	Total	Rank
Nestor Colonia	Men's 56 kg	~~113~~	113	~~117~~	140	~~150~~	~~150~~	253	7
Jeffrey Garcia	Men's 69kg	115	120	125	150	~~155~~	155	280	13

=== Women's events ===
Athlete	Event	Snatch			Clean & Jerk			Total	Rank
Athlete	Event	Attempt 1	Attempt 2	Attempt 3	Attempt 1	Attempt 2	Attempt 3	Total	Rank
Elien Rose Perez	Women's 48 kg	65	69	~~71~~	80	~~85~~	85	154	11
Elreen Ann Ando	Women's 63kg	85	90	~~93~~	105	111	~~115~~	201	4
Ma Dessa Delos Santos	Women's 53 kg	75	80	~~83~~	95	100	~~103~~	180	8
Hidilyn Diaz	Women's 53 kg	88	90	92	110	115	~~117~~	207	1st place, gold medalist(s)
Kristel Macrohon	Women's 69 kg	~~85~~	~~85~~	85	110	~~115~~	~~115~~	195	8

== Wrestling ==
Men's

Athlete	Event	Round of 32	Round of 16	Quarterfinals	Semifinals	Repechage	Final/BM	Rank
Athlete	Event	Opposition Result	Opposition Result	Opposition Result	Opposition Result	Opposition Result	Opposition Result	Rank
Alvin Lobreguito	Freestyle –57 kg	Makhmudjon Shavkatov (UZB); L 2–11	Did not advance					13
Jefferson Manatad	Greco-Roman –77kg	Askhat Dilmukhamedov (KAZ); L 0–8	Did not advance					12

== Wushu ==
=== Men ===
Nanquan\Nangun

Athlete	Event	Nanquan		Nangun		Total	
Athlete	Event	Result	Rank	Result	Rank	Result	Rank
Thornton Quieney Lou Sayan	Nanquan\Nangun All-Round	9.52	12	9.67	10	19.19	10

Sanda

Athlete	Event	Round of 32	Round of 16	Quarterfinals	Semifinals	Final
Athlete	Event	Opposition Result	Opposition Result	Opposition Result	Opposition Result	Opposition Result
Francisco Solis	-56 kg	Bye	Truong Giang Bui (VIE); L 0 – 2	Did not advance		
Jean Claude Saclag	-60 kg	Bye	Mio Iat San (MAC); W 2 – 0	Surya Bhanu Partap Singh (IND); L 0 – 2	Did not advance	
Clemente Tabugara Jr.	-65 kg	—N/a	Narender Grewal (IND); L 1 – 2	Did not advance		

Taijiquan\Taijijian

Athlete	Event	Taijiquan		Taijijian		Total	
Athlete	Event	Result	Rank	Result	Rank	Result	Rank
Jones Llabres Inso	Taijiquan\Taijijian All-Round	9.67	9	8.62	15	18.29	14
Daniel Parantac	Taijiquan\Taijijian All-Round	9.67	9	9.67	9	19.34	7

=== Women ===
Sanda

Athlete	Event	Round of 16	Quarterfinals	Semifinals	Final	
Athlete	Event	Opposition Result	Opposition Result	Opposition Result	Opposition Result	Rank
Divine Wally	-52 kg	Mimi Yoysaykham (LAO); W 2 – 0	Pertiwi Selviah (INA); W 2 – 0	Elaheh Mansoryan Samiroumi (IRI); L 1 – 2	Did not advance	3rd place, bronze medalist(s)

Taijiquan\Taijijian

Athlete	Event	Taijijian		Taijiquan		Total	
Athlete	Event	Result	Rank	Result	Rank	Result	Rank
Agatha Chrystenzen Wong	Taijiquan\Taijijian All-Round	9.68	3	9.68	5	19.36	3rd place, bronze medalist(s)

== See also ==
- Philippines at the 2018 Asian Para Games
