= Bowling at the 2018 Asian Games – Men's trios =

Men's trios at the 2018 Asian Games
- Venue: Jakabaring Bowling Center
- Date: 23 August 2018
- Competitors: 97 from 18 nations

Medalists
gold medal	Japan; Tomoyuki Sasaki, Shogo Wada, Shusaku Asato
silver medal	Malaysia; Timmy Tan, Ahmad Muaz Fishol, Muhammad Rafiq Ismail
bronze medal	Singapore; Alex Chong, Darren Ong, Jaris Goh

The men's trios competition at the 2018 Asian Games in Palembang was held on 23 August 2018 at Jakabaring Bowling Center.

Block 1 were played on long oil pattern lane, while Block 2 were played on medium oil pattern lane.

== Schedule ==
All times are Western Indonesia Time (UTC+07:00)

Date	Time	Event
Thursday, 23 August 2018	09:00	1st block
Thursday, 23 August 2018	13:30	2nd block

== Results ==
Rank	Team	Game						Total
Rank	Team	1	2	3	4	5	6	Total
1st place, gold medalist(s)	Japan 1 (JPN)	700	788	798	731	664	663	4344
	Tomoyuki Sasaki	223	245	245	266	205	208	1392
	Shogo Wada	234	277	253	209	234	200	1407
	Shusaku Asato	243	266	300	256	225	255	1545
2nd place, silver medalist(s)	Malaysia 2 (MAS)	702	687	695	752	648	751	4235
	Timmy Tan	243	232	205	262	211	234	1387
	Ahmad Muaz Fishol	225	221	212	256	245	253	1412
	Muhammad Rafiq Ismail	234	234	278	234	192	264	1436
3rd place, bronze medalist(s)	Singapore 1 (SGP)	739	673	723	652	755	684	4226
	Alex Chong	253	220	223	223	177	221	1317
	Darren Ong	264	231	257	210	289	233	1484
	Jaris Goh	222	222	243	219	289	230	1425
4	Indonesia 2 (INA)	720	666	703	763	615	723	4190
	Ryan Leonard Lalisang	221	211	244	289	181	255	1401
	Billy Muhammad Islam	247	232	233	231	230	235	1408
	Hardy Rachmadian	252	223	226	243	204	233	1381
5	Chinese Taipei 1 (TPE)	686	713	672	700	725	687	4183
	Wu Hao-ming	232	242	221	221	256	256	1428
	Lin Pai-feng	214	231	254	223	257	208	1387
	Hsieh Chin-liang	240	240	197	256	212	223	1368
6	South Korea 2 (KOR)	659	705	756	631	752	679	4182
	Kim Jong-wook	222	233	246	203	244	191	1339
	Koo Seong-hoi	232	243	244	243	220	277	1459
	Kang Hee-won	205	229	266	185	288	211	1384
7	Chinese Taipei 2 (TPE)	702	732	699	617	721	690	4161
	Chen Hsin-an	242	267	231	224	234	233	1431
	Chen Ming-tang	207	244	190	169	234	202	1246
	Hung Kun-yi	253	221	278	224	253	255	1484
8	Japan 2 (JPN)	721	721	690	661	670	693	4156
	Daisuke Yoshida	229	210	198	219	232	213	1301
	Takuya Miyazawa	242	267	267	233	221	278	1508
	Shota Koki	250	244	225	209	217	202	1347
9	Malaysia 1 (MAS)	746	709	743	658	621	670	4147
	Adrian Ang	223	223	230	220	204	221	1321
	Syafiq Ridhwan	266	254	246	232	206	232	1436
	Alex Liew	257	232	267	206	211	217	1390
10	Philippines 2 (PHI)	641	676	742	656	650	769	4134
	Kenneth Chua	201	243	244	232	242	267	1429
	Merwin Tan	208	198	252	199	196	245	1298
	Enrico Hernandez	232	235	246	225	212	257	1407
11	Indonesia 1 (INA)	677	686	678	675	713	699	4128
	Diwan Rezaldy	211	242	232	232	223	228	1368
	Fachri Ibnu Askar	233	215	213	203	246	231	1341
	Yeri Ramadona	233	229	233	240	244	240	1419
12	Hong Kong 1 (HKG)	741	629	728	709	661	619	4087
	Wu Siu Hong	235	221	243	256	235	210	1400
	Michael Mak	277	212	266	190	196	179	1320
	Eric Tseng	229	196	219	263	230	230	1367
13	Thailand 2 (THA)	697	745	621	697	690	617	4067
	Kim Bolleby	243	254	258	265	231	190	1441
	Atchariya Cheng	245	257	220	219	230	207	1378
	Sithiphol Kunaksorn	209	234	143	213	229	220	1248
14	Qatar 1 (QAT)	715	705	613	587	742	673	4035
	Ali Al-Janahi	240	231	192	214	246	189	1312
	Ahmed Al-Deyab	278	232	189	213	207	231	1350
	Yousef Al-Jaber	197	242	232	160	289	253	1373
15	Bahrain 1 (BRN)	712	618	709	728	662	598	4027
	Ahmed Al-Awadhi	233	199	233	238	224	200	1327
	Osama Abdulrahman Hasan	240	231	211	265	205	187	1339
	Yusuf Mohamed Falah	239	188	265	225	233	211	1361
16	Hong Kong 2 (HKG)	651	715	727	554	696	648	3991
	Ivan Tse	257	253	251	206	239	231	1437
	Wong Kwan Yuen	197	242	266	199	209	220	1333
	Lau Kwun Ho	197	220	210	149	248	197	1221
17	Saudi Arabia 2 (KSA)	619	644	708	686	616	698	3971
	Yousef Akbar	194	206	268	210	197	229	1304
	Abdulrahman Al-Kheliwi	192	206	204	231	213	213	1259
	Hassan Al-Shaikh	233	232	236	245	206	256	1408
17	Thailand 1 (THA)	692	575	724	683	667	630	3971
	Yannaphon Larpapharat	180	255	234	198	202	208	1277
	Annop Arromsaranon	278	180	235	243	211	222	1369
	Surasak Manuwong	234	140	255	242	254	200	1325
19	China 1 (CHN)	589	668	637	678	790	602	3964
	Chi Mengyu	179	201	234	211	245	176	1246
	Su Jun	178	220	171	233	279	223	1304
	Wang Hongbo	232	247	232	234	266	203	1414
20	South Korea 1 (KOR)	674	642	594	742	589	705	3946
	Park Jong-woo	242	220	173	244	207	244	1330
	Hong Hae-sol	199	223	208	232	187	221	1270
	Choi Bok-eum	233	199	213	266	195	240	1346
21	India 2 (IND)	648	656	711	655	599	628	3897
	Parvez Ahmed Saud	224	198	213	200	213	220	1268
	Shoumick Datta	188	201	255	244	177	208	1273
	Kishan Ramachandraiah	236	257	243	211	209	200	1356
22	Qatar 2 (QAT)	650	640	658	650	661	595	3854
	Jassim Al-Merikhi	246	210	235	191	222	221	1325
	Mohammed Al-Merikhi	223	211	219	256	197	169	1275
	Ghanim Aboujassoum	181	219	204	203	242	205	1254
23	Saudi Arabia 1 (KSA)	608	713	679	588	572	691	3851
	Adel Al-Bariqi	212	245	203	215	207	202	1284
	Sultan Al-Masri	198	221	224	188	164	276	1271
	Ammar Tarrad	198	247	252	185	201	213	1296
24	Bahrain 2 (BRN)	715	634	642	508	646	654	3799
	Ahmed Al-Goud	228	181	221	140	252	267	1289
	Omar Al-Mudhahki	245	242	209	209	196	174	1275
	Abdulla Abdulkarim Ali	242	211	212	159	198	213	1235
25	Philippines 1 (PHI)	590	689	577	639	629	653	3777
	Jomar Jumapao	202	189	190	198	190	192	1161
	Kenzo Umali	189	247	191	241	220	242	1330
	Raoul Miranda	199	253	196	200	219	219	1286
26	Singapore 2 (SGP)	692	657	604	652	558	606	3769
	Basil Ng	235	213	216	243	229	218	1354
	Cheah Ray Han	213	220	199	192	190	212	1226
	Jonovan Neo	244	224	189	217	139	176	1189
27	India 1 (IND)	622	632	633	612	599	622	3720
	Shabbir Dhankot	168	187	235	223	229	193	1235
	Akaash Ashok Kumar	218	211	176	202	198	216	1221
	Dhruv Sarda	236	234	222	187	172	213	1264
28	Macau 2 (MAC)	542	666	627	635	631	548	3649
	Zoe Dias Ma	181	219	199	209	220	209	1237
	Tam Tsz Sun	158	246	251	215	207	199	1276
	Lee Tak Man	203	201	177	211	204	140	1136
29	Macau 1 (MAC)	544	634	548	603	617	628	3574
	Leong Chou Kin	177	223	164	176	216	199	1155
	Ho Man Lok	199	220	165	220	189	220	1213
	Man Si Kei	168	191	219	207	212	209	1206
30	Mongolia 1 (MGL)	515	534	584	586	674	542	3435
	Tsedendambyn Lkhaasüren	162	167	211	190	244	180	1154
	Khürelbaataryn Khishigbat	168	147	176	196	242	199	1128
	Jamtsyn Sodnomdorj	185	220	197	200	188	163	1153
31	Mongolia 2 (MGL)	494	461	581	528	499	563	3126
	Dorjiin Chuluunbaatar	178	167	199	178	174	202	1098
	Enkhtöriin Amgalanbat	150	136	211	193	169	168	1027
	Jarantain Tsevegmid	166	158	171	157	156	193	1001
32	Kazakhstan 1 (KAZ)	367	382	413	339	384	420	2305
	Ruslan Ekkel	189	211	215	192	187	249	1243
	Zhaksylyk Saudabayev	178	171	198	147	197	171	1062
33	Vietnam 1 (VIE)	309	384	374	448	393	389	2297
	Trần Anh Tuấn	175	191	194	206	186	176	1128
	Nguyễn Văn Hoàng	134	193	180	242	207	213	1169
