= Malaysia at the 2018 Asian Games =

- IOC code: MAS
- NOC: Olympic Council of Malaysia
- Website: www.olympic.org.my

in Jakarta and Palembang 18 August – 2 September 2018
- Competitors: 447
- Flag bearer: Syakilla Salni
- Officials: 140
- Medals Ranked 14th: Gold 7 Silver 13 Bronze 16 Total 36

Asian Games appearances (overview)
- 1954; 1958; 1962; 1966; 1970; 1974; 1978; 1982; 1986; 1990; 1994; 1998; 2002; 2006; 2010; 2014; 2018; 2022; 2026

Other related appearances
- North Borneo (1954, 1958, 1962); Sarawak (1962)

Malaysia participated in the 2018 Asian Games in Jakarta and Palembang, Indonesia from 18 August to 2 September 2018. At the last edition in Incheon, the country placed 14 in the medals tally, with 5 gold medals from squash, sailing, and karate. In 2018 edition, Malaysia was represented by 447 athletes and 140 officials at the Games. Abdul Azim Mohamad Zabidi, the Appeals Committee chairman of the Olympic Council of Malaysia was the chief of the delegation.

== Media coverage ==
Malaysian satellite television provider Astro and public broadcaster Radio Televisyen Malaysia (RTM) held the broadcast rights of the 2018 Asian Games in the country. Astro broadcast the games live on 12 Astro SuperSport channels, 4 Astro Arena channels, as well as Astro GO and NJOI Now mobile applications. It was also one of the production teams for host broadcaster International Games Broadcast Services.

Radio Televisyen Malaysia broadcast the games live on 3 television channels, TV1, TV2 and RTM HD Sports (now Sukan RTM) and its over-the-top media service website, myklik (now RTMklik). This marked the return of the broadcast department to cover the games after 8 years, having previously replaced by Media Prima broadcast companies: TV3 and TV9 for the coverage of the 2014 edition.

== Medalists ==
The following Malaysian competitors won medals at the Games.

| Medal | Name | Sport | Event | Date |
|---|---|---|---|---|
| Gold | Esther Cheah; Siti Safiyah Amirah; Syaidatul Afifah Badrul Hamidi | Bowling | Women's trios | 22 Aug |
| Gold | Nicol David | Squash | Women's singles | 26 Aug |
| Gold | Muhammad Rafiq Ismail | Bowling | Men's masters | 27 Aug |
| Gold | Muhammad Norhaffizi Abd Razak; Farhan Adam; Mohamad Azlan Alias; Muhammad Zulkifli Abdul Razak; Muhammad Syahir Mohd Rosdi | Sepak takraw | Men's regu | 28 Aug |
| Gold | Azizulhasni Awang | Cycling track | Men's sprint | 30 Aug |
| Gold | Muhammad Fauzi Kaman Shah | Sailing | Laser 4.7 | 31 Aug |
| Gold | Mohd Nafiizwan Adnan; Ng Eain Yow; Ivan Yuen; Mohd Syafiq Kamal | Squash | Men's team | 1 Sep |
| Silver | Aidil Azman Azwawi; Farhan Adam; Mohamad Azlan Alias; Muhammad Afifuddin Mohd Razali; Said Ezwan Said De; Muhammad Hairul Hazizi Haidzir; Muhammad Kamal Ishak; Muhammad Noraizat Mohd Nordin; Muhammad Norhaffizi Abd Razak; Muhammad Syahir Mohd Rosdi; Mohd Syazreenqamar Salehan; Muhammad Zulkifli Abdul Razak | Sepak takraw | Men's team regu | 22 Aug |
| Silver | Mohd Qabil Ambak Mahamad Fathil | Equestrian | Individual dressage | 23 Aug |
| Silver | Ahmad Muaz Mohd Fishol; Muhammad Rafiq Ismail; Timmy Tan | Bowling | Men's trios | 23 Aug |
| Silver | Esther Cheah; Natasha Mohamed Roslan; Shalin Zulkifli; Sin Li Jane; Siti Safiyah Amirah; Syaidatul Afifah Badrul Hamidi | Bowling | Women's team of six | 24 Aug |
| Silver | Sivasangari Subramaniam | Squash | Women's singles | 26 Aug |
| Silver | Mohd Al Jufferi Jamari | Pencak silat | Men's tanding 70 kg | 27 Aug |
| Silver | Azizulhasni Awang; Muhammad Sahrom; Muhammad Alif Fahmy Khairul Anuar | Cycling track | Men's team sprint | 27 Aug |
| Silver | Muhammad Faizul M Nasir | Pencak silat | Men's tanding 55 kg | 27 Aug |
| Silver | Mohd Khaizul Yaacob | Pencak silat | Men's tanding 95 kg | 29 Aug |
| Silver | Mohd Fauzi Khalid | Pencak silat | Men's tanding 75 kg | 29 Aug |
| Silver | Ng Yan Yee; Nur Dhabitah Sabri | Diving | Women's synchronized 3 metres springboard | 29 Aug |
| Silver | Khairulnizam Afendy | Sailing | Men's Laser | 31 Aug |
| Silver | Malaysia men's national field hockey team: Amirul Aideed; Azri Hassan; Faiz Helmi Jali; Faizal Saari; Fitri Saari; Firhan Ashaari; Hairi Rahman; Joel van Huizen; Kumar Subramaniam; Marhan Jalil; Meor Azuan Hassan; Nabil Fiqri; Nik Aiman Nik Rozemi; Razie Rahim; Shahril Saabah; Sukri Mutalib; Syed Syafiq Syed Cholan; Tengku Ahmad Tajuddin | Field hockey | Men's tournament | 1 Sep |
| Bronze | Yap Khim Wen | Taekwondo | Women's individual poomsae | 19 Aug |
| Bronze | Mohd Nafiizwan Adnan | Squash | Men's singles | 25 Aug |
| Bronze | Prem Kumar Selvam | Karate | Men's kumite 60 kg | 26 Aug |
| Bronze | Mohamad Hazim Amzad | Pencak silat | Men's tanding 60 kg | 26 Aug |
| Bronze | Muhammad Robial Sobri | Pencak silat | Men's tanding 90 kg | 26 Aug |
| Bronze | Mohd Taqiyuddin Hamid; Muhammad Afifi Nordin | Pencak silat | Men's double | 27 Aug |
| Bronze | Alang Ariff Aqil Muhammad Ghazalli; Lee Kin Lip; Mohd Juwaidi Mazuki; Zulfadhli Ruslan | Archery | Compound Men's Double | 28 Aug |
| Bronze | Leong Mun Yee; Nur Dhabitah Sabri | Diving | Women's synchronized 10 metres platform | 28 Aug |
| Bronze | Nor Hamizah Abu Hassan; Nur Syazreen A Malik | Pencak silat | Women's double | 29 Aug |
| Bronze | Nicol David; Sivasangari Subramaniam; Low Wee Wern; Aifa Azman | Squash | Women's team | 31 Aug |
| Bronze | Azizulhasni Awang | Cycling track | Men's Keirin | 31 Aug |
| Bronze | Nur Shazrin Mohamad Latif | Sailing | Laser radial | 31 Aug |
| Bronze | Illham Wahai; Nuur Fatin Solehah Abdul Rahman | Sailing | Mixed RS one | 31 Aug |
| Bronze | Norashikin Mohamad Sayed; Nuraisyah Jamil | Sailing | Women's 470 | 31 Aug |
| Bronze | Chew Yiwei | Diving | Men's 3m springboard | 31 Aug |
| Bronze | Nur Dhabitah Sabri | Diving | Women's 3m springboard | 1 Sep |

Medals by sport
| Sport | 1st place, gold medalist(s) | 2nd place, silver medalist(s) | 3rd place, bronze medalist(s) | Total |
| Archery | 0 | 0 | 1 | 1 |
| Bowling | 2 | 2 | 0 | 4 |
| Cycling track | 1 | 1 | 1 | 3 |
| Diving | 0 | 1 | 3 | 4 |
| Equestrian | 0 | 1 | 0 | 1 |
| Hockey | 0 | 1 | 0 | 1 |
| Karate | 0 | 0 | 1 | 1 |
| Pencak silat | 0 | 4 | 4 | 8 |
| Sailing | 1 | 1 | 3 | 5 |
| Sepak takraw | 1 | 1 | 0 | 2 |
| Squash | 2 | 1 | 2 | 5 |
| Taekwondo | 0 | 0 | 1 | 1 |
| Total | 7 | 13 | 16 | 36 |

Medals by day
| Day | Date | 1st place, gold medalist(s) | 2nd place, silver medalist(s) | 3rd place, bronze medalist(s) | Total |
| 1 | 19 August | 0 | 0 | 1 | 1 |
| 2 | 20 August | 0 | 0 | 0 | 0 |
| 3 | 21 August | 0 | 0 | 0 | 0 |
| 4 | 22 August | 1 | 1 | 0 | 2 |
| 5 | 23 August | 0 | 2 | 0 | 2 |
| 6 | 24 August | 0 | 1 | 0 | 1 |
| 7 | 25 August | 0 | 0 | 1 | 1 |
| 8 | 26 August | 1 | 1 | 3 | 5 |
| 9 | 27 August | 1 | 3 | 1 | 5 |
| 10 | 28 August | 1 | 0 | 2 | 3 |
| 11 | 29 August | 0 | 3 | 1 | 4 |
| 12 | 30 August | 1 | 0 | 0 | 1 |
| 13 | 31 August | 1 | 1 | 6 | 8 |
| 14 | 1 September | 1 | 1 | 1 | 3 |
| 15 | 2 September | 0 | 0 | 0 | 0 |
| Total | | 7 | 13 | 16 | 36 |

=== Multiple medallists ===
The following Malaysia competitors won several medals at the 2018 Asian Games.

| Name | Medal | Sport | Event |
|---|---|---|---|
| Azizulhasni Awang | Gold; Silver; Bronze | Cycling | Men's sprint Men's team sprint Men's keirin |
| Muhammad Rafiq Ismail | Gold; Silver | Bowling | Men's masters Men's trios |
| Esther Cheah; Siti Safiyah Amirah; Syaidatul Afifah Badrul Hamidi | Gold; Silver | Bowling | Women's trios Women's team of six |
| Muhammad Norhaffizi Abd Razak; Farhan Adam; Mohamad Azlan Alias; Muhammad Zulkifli Abdul Razak; Muhammad Syahir Mohd Rosdi | Gold; Silver | Sepak takraw | Men's regu Men's team regu |
| Nicol David | Gold; Bronze | Squash | Women's singles Women's team |
| Mohd Nafiizwan Adnan | Gold; Bronze | Squash | Men's team Men's singles |
| Nur Dhabitah Sabri | Silver; Bronze; Bronze | Diving | Women's synchronized 3 m springboard Women's 3 m springboard Women's synchronized 10 m platform |
| Sivasangari Subramaniam | Silver; Bronze | Squash | Women's singles Women's team |

== Competitors ==
The following is a list of the number of competitors representing Malaysia that had participated at the Asian Games:

| Sport | Men | Women | Total |
|---|---|---|---|
| Archery () | 8 | 8 | 16 |
| Artistic swimming () | 0 | 3 | 3 |
| Athletics () | 13 | 2 | 15 |
| Badminton () | 10 | 4 | 14 |
| Basketball () | 4 | 6 | 10 |
| Beach volleyball () | 2 | 0 | 2 |
| Bowling () | 6 | 6 | 12 |
| Boxing () | 1 | 0 | 1 |
| Canoeing () | 17 | 17 | 34 |
| Contract bridge () | 6 | 4 | 10 |
| Cycling () | 15 | 3 | 18 |
| Diving () | 6 | 5 | 11 |
| Electronic sports () | 2 | 0 | 2 |
| Equestrian () | 4 | 1 | 5 |
| Fencing () | 5 | 3 | 8 |
| Field hockey () | 18 | 18 | 36 |
| Football () | 20 | 0 | 20 |
| Golf () | 4 | 3 | 7 |
| Gymnastics () | 5 | 7 | 12 |
| Handball () | 16 | 16 | 32 |
| Jet ski () | 2 | 0 | 2 |
| Judo () | 1 | 0 | 1 |
| Kabaddi () | 12 | 0 | 12 |
| Karate () | 4 | 3 | 7 |
| Paragliding () | 6 | 3 | 9 |
| Pencak silat () | 12 | 8 | 20 |
| Roller Sports () | 3 | 2 | 5 |
| Rowing () | 2 | 0 | 2 |
| Rugby sevens () | 12 | 0 | 12 |
| Sailing () | 5 | 5 | 10 |
| Sambo () | 2 | 0 | 2 |
| Sepak takraw () | 13 | 13 | 26 |
| Shooting () | 5 | 4 | 9 |
| Sport climbing () | 3 | 6 | 9 |
| Squash () | 4 | 4 | 8 |
| Swimming () | 5 | 1 | 6 |
| Table tennis () | 4 | 4 | 8 |
| Taekwondo () | 5 | 2 | 7 |
| Triathlon () | 2 | 2 | 4 |
| Wushu () | 4 | 3 | 7 |
| Total | 268 | 166 | 434 |

== Archery ==
=== Recurve ===
| Athlete | Event | Ranking round | | Round of 32 | Round of 16 | Round of 8 | Quarterfinal | Semi-final | Final / BM | |
| Athlete | Event | Score | Seed | Opposition score | Opposition score | Opposition score | Opposition score | Opposition score | Opposition score | Rank |
|---|---|---|---|---|---|---|---|---|---|---|
| Haziq Kamaruddin | Men's individual | 652 | 22 | Did not advance | | | | | | |
| Khairul Anuar Mohamad | Men's individual | 658 | 16 Q | Bye | Ahmed Ali Salem (QAT); W 6–0 | Htike Lin Oo (MYA); W 7–1 | Ilfat Abdullin (KAZ); L 3–7 | Did not advance | | |
| Muhammad Akmal Nor Hasrin | Men's individual | 657 | 18 Q | Bye | Riau Ega Agatha (INA); L 5–6 | Did not advance | | | | |
| Muhammad Zarif Syahiir Zolkepeli | Men's individual | 651 | 23 | Did not advance | | | | | | |
| Loke Shin Hui | Women's individual | 616 | 37 | Did not advance | | | | | | |
| Nuramalia Haneesha Mazlan | Women's individual | 624 | 30 Q | Bye | Linda Lestari (INA); L 4–6 | Did not advance | | | | |
| Nur Afisa Abdul Halil | Women's individual | 613 | 42 | Did not advance | | | | | | |
| Nur Aliya Ghapar | Women's individual | 631 | 27 Q | Bye | Kaori Kawanaka (JPN); L 0–6 | Did not advance | | | | |
| Haziq Kamaruddin; Khairul Anuar Mohamad; Muhammad Akmal Nor Hasrin | Men's team | 1967 | 5 Q | Bye | | Iran (IRI); L 0–6 | Did not advance | | | |
| Loke Shin Hui; Nuramalia Haneesha Mazlan; Nur Aliya Ghapar | Women's team | 1871 | 11 Q | —N/a | | Kazakhstan (KAZ); L 2–6 | Did not advance | | | |
| Haziq Kamaruddin; Nur Aliya Ghapar | Mixed team | 1289 | 11 Q | —N/a | | Vietnam (VIE); L 2–6 | Did not advance | | | |

=== Compound ===
| Athlete | Event | Ranking round | | Round of 32 | Round of 16 | Round of 8 | Quarterfinal | Semi-final | Final / BM | |
| Athlete | Event | Score | Seed | Opposition score | Opposition score | Opposition score | Opposition score | Opposition score | Opposition score | Rank |
|---|---|---|---|---|---|---|---|---|---|---|
| Alang Ariff Aqil Muhammad Ghazalli; Lee Kin Lip; Mohd Juwaidi Mazuki; Zulfadhli Ruslan | Men's team | 2072 | 5 Q | —N/a | | Laos (LAO); W 230–223 | Iran (IRI); W 232–224 | South Korea (KOR); L 229–235 | Chinese Taipei (TPE); W 225–223 | 3rd place, bronze medalist(s) |
| Fatin Nurfatehah Mat Salleh; Nurul Syazhera Mohd Asmi; Sazatul Nadhirah Zakaria; Saritha Cham Nong | Women's team | 2043 | 6 Q | —N/a | | Myanmar (MYA); W 229–222 | Chinese Taipei (TPE); L 221–225 | Did not advance | | |
| Alang Ariff Aqil Muhammad Ghazalli; Lee Kin Lip; Mohd Juwaidi Mazuki; Zulfadhli Ruslan; Fatin Nurfatehah Mat Salleh; Nurul Syazhera Mohd Asmi]] Sazatul Nadhirah Zakaria; Saritha Cham Nong | Mixed team | 1399 | 4 Q | —N/a | | Singapore (SGP); L 152–153 | Did not advance | | | |

== Artistic swimming ==
| Athlete | Event | Technical routine | | Free routine | | Overall | |
| Athlete | Event | Points | Rank | Points | Rank | Total | Rank |
|---|---|---|---|---|---|---|---|
| Gan Hua Wei; Foong Yan Nie | Women's duet | 73.2032 | 8 | 75.1333 | 8 | 148.3365 | 8 |

== Athletics ==
=== Men ===
| Athlete | Event | Qualification | | Semi-final | | Final | |
| Athlete | Event | Time / Score | Rank | Time / Score | Rank | Time / Score | Rank |
|---|---|---|---|---|---|---|---|
| Jonathan Nyepa | 100 metres | 10.43 | 13 Q | 10.46 | 14 | Did not advance | |
| Khairul Hafiz Jantan | 100 metres | 10.47 | 14 Q | 10.45 | 13 | Did not advance | |
| Rayzam Shah Wan Sofian | 110m hurdles | 14.15 | 12 | —N/a | | Did not advance | |
| Jonathan Nyepa; Khairul Hafiz Jantan; Muhammad Haiqal Hanafi; Nixson Kennedy | 4 × 100 metres relay | 39.59 | 8 q | —N/a | | DQ | |
| Muhammad Irfan Shamsuddin | Discus throw | —N/a | | | | 57.70 | 5 |
| Jackie Wong Siew Cheer | Hammer throw | —N/a | | | | 65.92 | 7 |
| Lee Hup Wei | High jump | 2.15 | =5 Q | —N/a | | 2.20 | 10 |
| Nauraj Singh Randhawa | High jump | 2.15 | =1 Q | —N/a | | 2.24 | 7 |
| Luqman Hakim Ramlan | Long jump | 7.42 | 15 | —N/a | | Did not advance | |
| Alwi Iskandar | Pole vault | —N/a | | | | 5.20 | 9 |
| Muhammad Hakimi Ismail | Triple jump | —N/a | | | | 16.15 | 7 |

=== Women ===
| Athlete | Event | Qualification | | Semi-final | | Final | |
| Athlete | Event | Time / Score | Rank | Time / Score | Rank | Time / Score | Rank |
|---|---|---|---|---|---|---|---|
| Zaidatul Husniah Zulkifli | 100 metres | 11.59 | 7 Q | 11.70 | 8 Q | 11.61 | 8 |
| Norliyana Kamaruddin | Heptathlon | —N/a | | | | 4657 | 10 |

== Badminton ==
OCM announced the Malaysia badminton squad of 14 players (10 men's and 4 women's). On Saturday, 30 June 2018, the Badminton Association of Malaysia (BAM) dropped Iskandar Zulkarnain Zainuddin from the squad due to smoking and disciplinary issues, but because Lee Chong Wei withdrew from the competition, he will be considered again by BAM. BAM finally decide the 2018 World Championships bronze medalist Liew Daren to replace Lee Chong Wei, while Soong Joo Ven replace Iskandar to join the squad.

Men

| Athlete | Event | Round of 64 | Round of 32 | Round of 16 | Quarterfinal | Semi-final | Final | |
| Athlete | Event | Opposition score | Opposition score | Opposition score | Opposition score | Opposition score | Opposition score | Rank |
|---|---|---|---|---|---|---|---|---|
| Liew Daren | Singles | Bye | Heo K-h (KOR); L 1–2 | Did not advance | | | | |
| Lee Zii Jia | Singles | Bye | A Sarwar (PAK); W 2–0 | Son W-h (KOR); L 0–2 | Did not advance | | | |
| Goh V Shem; Tan Wee Kiong | Doubles | —N/a | D Puavaranukroh / K Kedren (THA); W 2–0 | B Shrestha / N Shrestha (NEP); W 2–0 | M F Gideon / K S Sukamuljo (INA); L 0–2 | Did not advance | | |
| Teo Ee Yi; Ong Yew Sin | Doubles | —N/a | Or C C / Lee C H (HKG); W 2–0 | T Kamura / K Sonoda (JPN); W 2–0 | F Alfian / M R Ardianto (INA); L 0–2 | Did not advance | | |
| Liew Daren; Lee Zii Jia; Leong Jun Hao; Soong Joo Ven; Goh V Shem; Tan Wee Kiong; Teo Ee Yi; Ong Yew Sin; Chan Peng Soon; Goh Soon Huat | Team | —N/a | | Japan (3); L 0–3 | Did not advance | | | |

Women

| Athlete | Event | Round of 32 | Round of 16 | Quarterfinal | Semi-final | Final | |
| Athlete | Event | Opposition score | Opposition score | Opposition score | Opposition score | Opposition score | Rank |
|---|---|---|---|---|---|---|---|
| Chow Mei Kuan; Lee Meng Yean | Doubles | Chen H-h / Hu L-f (TPE); W 2–0 | A Ponnappa / N. S Reddy (IND); L 1–2 | Did not advance | | | |

Mixed

| Athlete | Event | Round of 32 | Round of 16 | Quarterfinal | Semi-final | Final | |
| Athlete | Event | Opposition score | Opposition score | Opposition score | Opposition score | Opposition score | Rank |
|---|---|---|---|---|---|---|---|
| Chan Peng Soon; Goh Liu Ying | Mixed | P J Chopra / N S Reddy (IND); W 2–0 | Lee C H / Chau H W (HKG); L 1–2 | Did not advance | | | |
| Goh Soon Huat; Shevon Jemie Lai | Mixed | Wang C-l / Lee C-h (TPE); W 2–0 | Tang C M / Tse Y S (HKG); L 1–2 | Did not advance | | | |

== Basketball ==
Malaysia didn't join the 5x5 basketball event, but joined the 3x3 basketball event instead.

Summary

| Team | Event | Group stage | | | | | Rank | Quarterfinal | Semi-final | Final | Rank |
| Team | Event | Opposition score | Opposition score | Opposition score | Opposition score | Opposition score | Rank | Opposition score | Opposition score | Opposition score | Rank |
|---|---|---|---|---|---|---|---|---|---|---|---|
| Malaysia men's | Men's 3x3 Tournament | Iran; L 13–18 | Afghanistan; W 22–9 | Iraq; L 16–19 | Kazakhstan; L 14–21 | Turkmenistan; W 17–13 | 4 | Did not advance | | | |
| Malaysia women's | Women's 3x3 Tournament | Vietnam; W 13–12 | China; L 14–22 | Qatar; W 18–7 | —N/a | | 2 Q | Thailand; L 13–15 | Did not advance | | |

=== Men's 3x3 Tournament ===
Roster

- Wong Yi Hou
- Heng Yee Tong
- Ting Chun Hong
- Liew Wen Qian

Group D

| Pos | Team | Pld | W | L | PF | PA | PD | Qualification |
|---|---|---|---|---|---|---|---|---|
| 1 | Iran | 5 | 5 | 0 | 99 | 56 | +43 | Quarterfinals |
| 2 | Kazakhstan | 5 | 3 (Note: Head-to-head result: KAZ 21–18 IRQ.) | 2 | 91 | 82 | +9 | Quarterfinals |
| 3 | Iraq | 5 | 3 | 2 | 90 | 82 | +8 | |
| 4 | Malaysia | 5 | 2 (Note: Head-to-head result: MAS 17–13 TKM.) | 3 | 82 | 80 | +2 | |
| 5 | Turkmenistan | 5 | 2 | 3 | 73 | 76 | −3 | |
| 6 | Afghanistan | 5 | 0 | 5 | 47 | 106 | −59 | |

Source: OCA
Notes:

22 August
18:40

| Malaysia | 13–18 | Iran |
| Pts: Heng 7 | | Pts: Azari 8 |

Gelora Bung Karno Tennis Center Court, Jakarta
Referees: Ho (HKG), Al-Harthi (OMA)

22 August
20:30

| Iraq | 19–16 | Malaysia |
| Pts: Hasan 11 | | Pts: Ting 8 |

Gelora Bung Karno Tennis Center Court, Jakarta
Referees: Tan (SGP), Ito (JPN)

22 August
19:20

| Malaysia | 22–9 | Afghanistan |
| Pts: Liew 8 | | Pts: Mirzad 5 |

Gelora Bung Karno Tennis Center Court, Jakarta
Referees: Ho (HKG), Tan (SGP)

25 August
15:20

| Malaysia | 14–21 | Kazakhstan |
| Pts: Ting 10 | | Pts: Belozor 8 |

Gelora Bung Karno Tennis Center Court, Jakarta
Referees: Quinn (INA), Tan (SGP)

25 August
17:10

| Turkmenistan | 13–17 | Malaysia |
| Pts: Bekçanow 5 | | Pts: Wong 7 |

Gelora Bung Karno Tennis Center Court, Jakarta
Referees: Tan (SGP), Ho (HKG)

=== Women's 3x3 Tournament ===
Roster

- Ho Ching Yee
- Wong Sze Qian
- Hiew Ky Lie
- Ng Yu Feng

Group A

| Pos | Team | Pld | W | L | PF | PA | PD | Qualification |
|---|---|---|---|---|---|---|---|---|
| 1 | China | 3 | 3 | 0 | 66 | 26 | +40 | Quarterfinals |
| 2 | Malaysia | 3 | 2 | 1 | 45 | 41 | +4 | Quarterfinals |
| 3 | Vietnam | 3 | 1 | 2 | 33 | 41 | −8 | |
| 4 | Qatar | 3 | 0 | 3 | 16 | 52 | −36 | |

Source: OCA

21 August
15:40

| Vietnam | 12–13 | Malaysia |
| Pts: Trần 5 | | Pts: Wong, Ho 4 |

Gelora Bung Karno Tennis Center Court, Jakarta
Referees: Al-Harthi (OMA), Rulyov (KAZ)

24 August
19:00

| Malaysia | 14–22 | China |
| Pts: Ho 8 | | Pts: Jiang 12 |

Gelora Bung Karno Tennis Center Court, Jakarta
Referees: Ito (JPN), Al-Harthi (OMA)

24 August
20:00

| Qatar | 7–18 | Malaysia |
| Pts: Soliman 4 | | Pts: Ho 9 |

Gelora Bung Karno Tennis Center Court, Jakarta
Referees: Al-Harthi (OMA), Ibragimow (TKM)

Quarter-finals

26 August
15:50

| Thailand | 15–13 | Malaysia |
| Pts: Bunsinprom 7 | | Pts: Wong 5 |

Gelora Bung Karno Tennis Center Court, Jakarta
Referees: Al-Harthi (OMA), Ito (JPN)

== Beach volleyball ==
| Athlete | Event | Preliminary | | | | Round of 16 | Quarterfinals | Semifinals | Final / BM | |
| Athlete | Event | Opposition score | Opposition score | Opposition score | Rank | Opposition score | Opposition score | Opposition score | Opposition score | Rank |
|---|---|---|---|---|---|---|---|---|---|---|
| Rafi Asruki Nordin; Raja Nazmi Saifuddin | Men's tournament | A Kuleshov – A Babichev (KAZ); L 0–2 | Gao P – Li Y (CHN); L 0–2 | Hsu C-w – Wu S-s (TPE); W 2–1 | 3 | Did not advance | | | | |

== Bowling ==
=== Men ===
| Athlete | Event | Block 1 | | Block 2 | | Total | Final |
| Athlete | Event | Score | Rank | Score | Rank | Total | Final |
|---|---|---|---|---|---|---|---|
| Adrian Ang; Liew Kien Liang; Muhamad Syafiq Ridhwan Abdul Malek | Trios | 2198 | 2 | —N/a | | 4147 | 9 |
| Ahmad Muaz Mohd Fishol; Muhammad Rafiq Ismail; Tan Chye Chern | Trios | 2084 | 10 | —N/a | | 4235 | 2nd place, silver medalist(s) |
| Adrian Ang; Ahmad Muaz Mohd Fishol; Liew Kien Liang; Muhammad Rafiq Ismail; Muhamad Syafiq Ridhwan Abdul Malek; Tan Chye Chern | Team of Six | 3912 | 11 | —N/a | | 8042 | 7 |
| Muhamad Syafiq Ridhwan Abdul Malek | Masters | 1776 | 13 | 3806 | 8 | Did not advance | |
| Muhammad Rafiq Ismail | Masters | 1889 | 6 | 4005 | 1 | 539 | 1st place, gold medalist(s) |

=== Women ===
| Athlete | Event | Block 1 | | Block 2 | | Total | Final |
| Athlete | Event | Score | Rank | Score | Rank | Total | Final |
|---|---|---|---|---|---|---|---|
| Esther Cheah; Siti Safiyah Amirah; Syaidatul Afifah Badrul Hamidi | Trios | 2184 | 1 | —N/a | | 4326 | 1st place, gold medalist(s) |
| Natasha Mohamed Roslan; Shalin Zulkifli; Jane Sin Li | Trios | 2151 | 2 | —N/a | | 4144 | 4 |
| Esther Cheah; Natasha Mohamed Roslan; Shalin Zulkifli; Jane Sin Li; Siti Safiyah Amirah; Syaidatul Afifah Badrul Hamidi | Team of Six | 4024 | 2 | —N/a | | 8149 | 2nd place, silver medalist(s) |
| Natasha Mohamed Roslan | Masters | 1811 | 12 | 3965 | 10 | Did not advance | |
| Syaidatul Afifah Badrul Hamidi | Masters | 1797 | 13 | 3544 | 14 | Did not advance | |

== Boxing ==
| Athlete | Event | Round of 32 | Round of 16 | Quarterfinal | Semi-final | Final | Rank |
| Athlete | Event | Opposition score | Opposition score | Opposition score | Opposition score | Opposition score | Rank |
|---|---|---|---|---|---|---|---|
| Muhamad Fuad Mohd Redzuan | Men's light flyweight 49kg | Wuttichai Yurachai (THA); L 0–5 | Did not advance | | | | |

== Canoeing ==
=== Kayak Slalom ===
==== Men ====
| Athlete | Event | Heat | | Semi-final | | Final | |
| Athlete | Event | Score | Rank | Score | Rank | Score | Rank |
|---|---|---|---|---|---|---|---|
| Muhammad Nazrin Najib | Kayak single | 112.99 | 15 | did not advance | | | |

==== Women ====
| Athlete | Event | Heat | | Semi-final | | Final | |
| Athlete | Event | Score | Rank | Score | Rank | Score | Rank |
|---|---|---|---|---|---|---|---|
| Marina Muzaffa | Kayak single | 157.97 | 12 | did not advance | | | |

=== Kayak Sprint ===
==== Men ====
| Athlete | Event | Heat | | Repechage | | Semi-final | | Final | |
| Athlete | Event | Score | Rank | Score | Rank | Score | Rank | Score | Rank |
|---|---|---|---|---|---|---|---|---|---|
| Malaysia's Men Team | Canoe TBR 200m | 54.788 | 8 | 54.408 | 2 Q | 54.900 | 8 | 54.955 | 9 |
| Malaysia's Men Team | Canoe TBR 500m | 2:26:544 | 11 | 2:25:714 | 5 Q | —N/a | | 2:25:677 | 11 |
| Malaysia's Men Team | Canoe TBR 1000m | 4:52:472 | 7 | 4:57:468 | 5 Q | —N/a | | 5:04:153 | 11 |

==== Women ====
| Athlete | Event | Heat | | Repechage | | Semi-final | | Final | |
| Athlete | Event | Score | Rank | Score | Rank | Score | Rank | Score | Rank |
|---|---|---|---|---|---|---|---|---|---|
| Malaysia's Women Team | Canoe TBR 200m | 1:02:829 | 11 | 1:02:314 | 5 Q | —N/a | | 1:02:748 | 11 |
| Malaysia's Women Team | Canoe TBR 500m | 2:38:884 | 11 | 2:41:082 | 4 Q | 2:44:702 | 10 | 2:42:134 | 11 |

=== Canoe polo (demonstration) ===
For the first time in Asian Games history, canoe polo contested as demonstration sport, meaning medals won in this sport will not be counted in the official overall medal tally.

| Athlete | Event | Rank |
|---|---|---|
| Malaysia; Irfan Abu; Amirul Azfar Azwan; Faizal Abdul Jalil; Naqiudddin Taha; Haikal Suliaman; Amirudin Shuib | Men | 2nd place, silver medalist(s) |

== Contract bridge ==
=== Men ===
| Athlete | Event | Qualification | | Semi-final | | Final | |
| Athlete | Event | Score | Rank | Score | Rank | Score | Rank |
|---|---|---|---|---|---|---|---|
| David Law Chee Tho; Khor Shi Jie; Ong Ka Shing; Tan Su Beng; Tan Sze Kuan; Yeoh Li Yuan | Team | 73.85 | 13 | Did not advance | | | |

=== Supermixed ===
| Athlete | Event | Qualification | | Semi-final | | Final | |
| Athlete | Event | Score | Rank | Score | Rank | Score | Rank |
|---|---|---|---|---|---|---|---|
| Khor Shi Jie; Lee Fee Khoon; Lee Hung Fong; Ong Ka Shing; Yap Ching Kuan | Team | 36.25 | 10 | Did not advance | | | |

== Cycling ==
=== BMX ===
| Athlete | Event | Seeding run | | Motos | | Final | |
| Athlete | Event | Time | Rank | Point | Rank | Time | Rank |
|---|---|---|---|---|---|---|---|
| Noor Quraataina Mamat | Women's race | 45.13 | 9 | 17 | 5 | Did not advance | |

=== Road ===
| Athlete | Event | Final | |
| Athlete | Event | Time | Rank |
|---|---|---|---|
| Muhammad Zawawi Azman | Men's Road Race | 3.27.35 | 18 |
| Nik Mohd Azman Zulkiflie | Men's Road Race | 3.26.07 | 13 |
| Nik Mohd Azman Zulkiflie | Men's Time Trial | 1:04:57:20 | 13 |

=== Track ===
==== Men ====
| Athlete | Event | Qualification | | Round 1/ Round of 16 | | Round of 8 | Quarterfinal | Semifinal | | Final | |
| Athlete | Event | Time | Rank | Time | Rank | Rank | Rank | Time | Rank | Score | Rank |
|---|---|---|---|---|---|---|---|---|---|---|---|
| Muhammad Nur Aiman Rosli | Men's omnium | —N/a | | | | | | | | 65 | 11 |
| Azizulhasni Awang | Men's sprint | 10.046 | 5 Q | —N/a | | 1 Q | 1 Q | 10.184; 10.262 | QG | 10.386; 10.189 | 1st place, gold medalist(s) |
| Muhammad Shah Firdaus Sahrom | Men's sprint | 10.053 | 7 Q | —N/a | | 1 Q | 1 Q | 10.316 + 0.016 | QB | —N/a | 4 |
| Azizulhasni Awang | Men's keirin | —N/a | | 10.234 + 0.036 | Q | —N/a | | 10.120 + 0.087 | QG | 10.009 + 0.062 | 3rd place, bronze medalist(s) |
| Muhammad Shah Firdaus Sahrom | Men's keirin | —N/a | | 10.234 + 0.106 | Q | —N/a | | 10.472 + 0.569 | Q | 10.542 | 7 |
| Mohamad Nur Aiman Mohd Zariff | Men's Pursuit | 4:36:723 | 8 | —N/a | | | | | | Did not advance | |
| Irwandie Lakasek; Muhammad Danieal Haikkal Edy Suhaidee | Men's madison | —N/a | | | | | | | | DNF | – |
| Azizulhasni Awang; Muhammad Fadhil Mohd Zonis; Muhammad Shah Firdaus Sahrom | Men's team sprint | 43.934 | 1 Q | —N/a | | | | | | 44.598 | 2nd place, silver medalist(s) |
| Irwandie Lakasek; Muhamad Afiq Huznie Othman; Muhamad Nur Aiman Mohd Zariff; Muhammad Danieal Haikkal Edy Suhaidee | Men's team pursuit | 4:14:039 | 6 Q | 4:15:768 | 7 | —N/a | | | | Did not advance | |

==== Women ====
| Athlete | Event | Qualification | | Round 1/8 | | Repechage/Quarterfinal | | Round 2/Semifinal | | Final | |
| Athlete | Event | Time | Rank | Time | Rank | Time | Rank | Time | Rank | Score | Rank |
|---|---|---|---|---|---|---|---|---|---|---|---|
| Som Net JP | Women's omnium | —N/a | | | | | | | | 118 | 4 |
| Anis Amira Rosidi | Women's sprint | 11.858 | 13 Q | +0.351 | 2 | Did not advance | | | | | |
| Farina Shawati Mohd Adnan | Women's sprint | 11.623 | 10 Q | +0.204 | 2 | Did not advance | | | | | |
| Anis Amira Rosidi | Women's keirin | —N/a | | +1.588 | 3 R | +1.207 | 3 Q | —N/a | 5 | —N/a | 12 |
| Farina Shawati Mohd Adnan | Women's keirin | —N/a | | +0.112 | 3 R | +0.209 | 3 Q | —N/a | 6 | —N/a | 9 |
| Farina Shawati Mohd Adnan; Anis Amira Rosidi | Women's team sprint | 35.261 | 6 | —N/a | | | | | | Did not advance | |

== Diving ==
=== Men ===
| Athlete | Event | Preliminary | | Final | |
| Athlete | Event | Result | Rank | Result | Rank |
|---|---|---|---|---|---|
| Muhammad Syafiq Puteh | Men's 1m springboard | 361.25 | 5 Q | 334.20 | 7 |
| Ahmad Amsyar Azman | Men's 1m springboard | 343.70 | 6 Q | 362.60 | 4 |
| Chew Yiwei | Men's 3m springboard | 416.25 | 5 Q | 456.20 | 3rd place, bronze medalist(s) |
| Ooi Tze Liang | Men's 3m springboard | 380.50 | 9 Q | 413.05 | 7 |
| Jellson Jabillin | Men's 10m platform | 390.85 | 7 Q | 385.05 | 8 |
| Chew Yiwei; Ooi Tze Liang | Men's synchronized 3m springboard | —N/a | | 396.27 | 4 |
| Jellson Jabillin; Hanis Nazirul Jaya Surya | Men's synchronized 10m platform | —N/a | | 356.52 | 5 |

=== Women ===
| Athlete | Event | Preliminary | | Final | |
| Athlete | Event | Score | Rank | Result | Rank |
|---|---|---|---|---|---|
| Leong Mun Yee | Women's 1m springboard | 210.40 | 9 Q | 224.60 | 8 |
| Nur Dhabitah Sabri | Women's 1m springboard | 252.85 | 4 Q | 263.05 | 4 |
| Ng Yan Yee | Women's 3m springboard | 276.60 | 7 Q | 304.80 | 5 |
| Nur Dhabitah Sabri | Women's 3m springboard | 303.65 | 4 Q | 330.75 | 3rd place, bronze medalist(s) |
| Pandelela Rinong | Women's 10m platform | 277.40 | 6 Q | DNS | |
| Ng Yan Yee; Nur Dhabitah Sabri | Women's synchronized 3m springboard | —N/a | | 298.23 | 2nd place, silver medalist(s) |
| Leong Mun Yee; Nur Dhabitah Sabri | Women's synchronized 10m platform | —N/a | | 310.80 | 3rd place, bronze medalist(s) |

== Equestrian ==
=== Dressage ===
| Athlete | Horse | Event | Prix St-George | | Intermediate | | Freestyle | | Overall |
| Athlete | Horse | Event | Score | Rank | Score | Rank | Score | Rank | Rank |
|---|---|---|---|---|---|---|---|---|---|
| Mohd Qabil Ambak Mahamad Fathil | ROSENSTOLZ | Individual | 74.881 | 1 | 73.499 | 1 | 76.620 | 2 | 2nd place, silver medalist(s) |

=== Jumping ===
| Athlete | Horse | Event | Qualification | | Qualifier | | | | Final | |
| Athlete | Horse | Event | Qualification | | 1 | | 2 | | Final | |
| Athlete | Horse | Event | Score | Rank | Score | Rank | Score | Rank | Score | Rank |
|---|---|---|---|---|---|---|---|---|---|---|
| Mohd Qabil Ambak Mahamad Fathil | 3Q Qalisya | Individual | 6.17 | 26 | 10.17 | 19 | 11.17 | 18 | 21.17 | 13 |
| Neelan Jonathan Ratnasingham | Connely 2 | Individual | 12.85 | 49 | 13.85 | 28 | 26.85 | 34 | 43.85 | 21 |
| Sharmini Christina Ratnasingham | Arcado L | Individual | 13.03 | 52 | 23.03 | 46 | 28.03 | 39 | EL | 38 |
| Mohd Qabil Ambak Mahamad Fathil; Neelan Jonathan Ratnasingham; Sharmini Christina Ratnasingham | 3Q Qalisya; Arcado L Connely 2 | Team | 32.05 | 11 | 47.05 | 9 | N/A | | 66.05 | 9 |

== Esports (demonstration) ==
Esports is being featured at the 2018 Asian Games as a demonstration sport, meaning medals won in this sport will not be counted in the official overall medal tally. eSports will be a medal event at the 2022 Asian Games.It is being held from 26 August to 1 September 2018.Six video game titles are being featured in the demonstration event.

| Athlete | Event | Rank |
|---|---|---|
| Malaysia; Mohamad NorHaikal bin Mohamad Noh (alpha_gaming07); Muhamad Khairul bin Abdul Aziz (hanglejen) | Pro Evolution Soccer tournament | 4 |

== Field hockey ==
Malaysia men's team competed at the Games in pool B, while the women's team in pool A.

Summary

| Team | Event | Group stage | | | | | | Semifinal | Final / BM / Pl. | |
| Team | Event | Opposition Score | Opposition Score | Opposition Score | Opposition Score | Opposition Score | Rank | Opposition Score | Opposition Score | Rank |
|---|---|---|---|---|---|---|---|---|---|---|
| Malaysia men's | Men's tournament | Kazakhstan; W 16–2 | Thailand; W 10–0 | Bangladesh; W 7–0 | Pakistan; L 1–4 | Oman; W 7–0 | 2 Q | India; W 7–6^{P} FT: 2–2 | Japan; L 1–3^{P} FT: 6–6 | 2nd place, silver medalist(s) |
| Malaysia women's | Women's tournament | Hong Kong; W 8–0 | China; D 2–2 | Chinese Taipei; W 11–0 | Japan; L 1–3 | —N/a | 3 | Did not advance | Thailand; W 2–0 | 5 |

=== Men's tournament ===
Roster

The following is the Malaysia roster in the men's field hockey tournament of the 2018 Asian Games.

Head coach: (Malaysia) Stephen van Huizen

6. Marhan Jalil
7. Fitri Saari
9. Joel van Huizen
10. Faizal Saari
11. Syed Syafiq Syed Cholan
12. Sukri Mutalib (C)
13. Firhan Ashaari
14. Amirul Aideed
15. Nabil Fiqri
16. Kumar Subramaniam (GK)
17. Razie Rahim
18. Faiz Helmi Jali
19. Azri Hassan
20. Meor Azuan Hassan
23. Tengku Ahmad Tajuddin
24. Nik Aiman Nik Rozemi
26. Shahril Saabah
29. Hairi Rahman (GK)

Pool B

| Pos | Team | Pld | W | D | L | PF | PA | PD | Pts | Qualification |
|---|---|---|---|---|---|---|---|---|---|---|
| 1 | Pakistan | 5 | 5 | 0 | 0 | 45 | 1 | +44 | 15 | Semi-finals |
| 2 | Malaysia | 5 | 4 | 0 | 1 | 41 | 6 | +35 | 12 | Semi-finals |
| 3 | Bangladesh | 5 | 3 | 0 | 2 | 11 | 15 | −4 | 9 | Fifth place game |
| 4 | Oman | 5 | 2 | 0 | 3 | 7 | 19 | −12 | 6 | Seventh place game |
| 5 | Thailand | 5 | 1 | 0 | 4 | 4 | 27 | −23 | 3 | Ninth place game |
| 6 | Kazakhstan | 5 | 0 | 0 | 5 | 5 | 45 | −40 | 0 | Eleventh place game |

Source: FIH
Rules for classification: 1) points; 2) goal difference; 3) goals scored; 4) head-to-head result.

20 August 2018
18:00

| Malaysia | 16–2 | Kazakhstan |
|---|---|---|
| Fa. Saari 2', 43', 53'; Jali 6'; Rahim 8', 34', 43', 48', 56'; Nik Rozemi 9', 13'; Saabah 20', 21'; Hasan 23'; Syafiq 30'; Tajuddin 38' | Report | Yelubayev 14'; Abdulabayev 55' |

Umpires:
You Saolong (CHN)
Dayan Dissanayake (SRI)

22 August 2018
16:00

| Malaysia | 10–0 | Thailand |
|---|---|---|
| M.A. Hassan 6'; Fa. Saari 19'; Ashaari 19'; Rahim 21'; A. Hassan 27'; Saabah 28', 40'; Aideed 37'; Tajuddin 44'; Fi. Saari 57' | Report |

Umpires:
Kim Hong-lae (KOR)
Dayan Dissanayake (SRI)

24 August 2018
12:00

| Bangladesh | 0–7 | Malaysia |
|---|---|---|
| | Report | Rahim 18', 22'; Aideed 28'; Fa. Saari 31' van Huizen 38'; Fiqri 44'; Ashaari 60' |

Umpires:
Raghu Prasad (IND)
Gus Soteriades (USA)

26 August 2018
20:00

| Pakistan | 4–1 | Malaysia |
|---|---|---|
| Irfan 6'; Ahmad 38', 48'; Ali 43' | Report | Jali 11' |

Umpires:
Gus Soteriades (USA)
Federico Garcia (URU)

28 August 2018
14:00

| Malaysia | 7-0 | Oman |
|---|---|---|
| Rahim 28'; Tajuddin 32', 45'; Fa. Saari 34', 48'; Ashari 37'; Rozemi 42' | Report |

Umpires:
Raghu Prasad (IND)
Michihiko Watanabe (JPN)

Semifinal

30 August 2018
17:30

| India | 2–2 | Malaysia |
|---|---|---|
| Harmanpreet 33'; Varun 40' | Report | Faizal 39'; Razie 59' |
Penalties
| Manpreet (penalty shoot-out missed); Akashdeep (penalty shoot-out scored); Dilpreet (penalty shoot-out missed); S. V. Sunil (penalty shoot-out missed); Harmanpreet (penalty shoot-out scored); Harmanpreet (penalty shoot-out scored); Akashdeep (penalty shoot-out scored); Manpreet (penalty shoot-out scored); Dilpreet (penalty shoot-out scored); S. V. Sunil (penalty shoot-out missed) | 6–7 | (penalty shoot-out scored) Firhan; (penalty shoot-out missed) Tajuddin; (penalty shoot-out missed) Faizal; (penalty shoot-out missed) M. Hasan; (penalty shoot-out scored) Fitri; (penalty shoot-out scored) Firhan; (penalty shoot-out scored) Fitri; (penalty shoot-out scored) M. Hasan; (penalty shoot-out scored) Faizal; (penalty shoot-out scored) Tajuddin |

Umpires:
Gareth Greenfield (NZL)
Kim Hong-lae (KOR)

Gold medal game

1 September 2018
20:00

| Malaysia | 6–6 | Japan |
|---|---|---|
| Razie 4'; Tajuddin 11', 12', 59'; Faizal 17'; Amirol 50' | Report | S. Tanaka 9'; Ke. Tanaka 23', 53'; Ka. Tanaka 52'; Yamasaki 58'; Ochiai 60' |
Penalties
| Firhan (penalty shoot-out scored); Faizal (penalty shoot-out missed); M. Hasan (penalty shoot-out missed); Tajuddin (penalty shoot-out missed) | 1–3 | (penalty shoot-out scored) Yamasaki; (penalty shoot-out scored) Ke. Tanaka; (penalty shoot-out missed) S. Tanaka; (penalty shoot-out missed) Ochiai; (penalty shoot-out scored) Murata |

Umpires:
Javed Shaikh (IND)
Kim Hong-lae (KOR)

=== Women's tournament ===
Roster

The following is the Malaysia roster in the women's field hockey tournament of the 2018 Asian Games.

Head coach: (Malaysia) Dharma Raj Abdullah

1. Farah Yahya (GK)
2. Nuraini Rashid
3. Nuraslinda Said
5. Hasliza Ali
6. Norsharina Shabuddin
7. Siti Ruhani (C)
8. Juliani Din
11. Norazlin Sumantri
12. Hanis Onn
13. Surizan Awang
14. Zafirah Aziz
15. Syafiqah Zain
16. Huzaimah Aziz (GK)
19. Fazilla Sylvester
20. Norfaiezah Saiuti
21. Fatin Sukri
26. Nuramirah Zulkifli
29. Kirandeep Kaur

Pool A

| Pos | Team | Pld | W | D | L | PF | PA | PD | Pts | Qualification |
|---|---|---|---|---|---|---|---|---|---|---|
| 1 | Japan | 4 | 4 | 0 | 0 | 24 | 3 | +21 | 12 | Semifinals |
| 2 | China | 4 | 2 | 1 | 1 | 28 | 6 | +22 | 7 | Semifinals |
| 3 | Malaysia | 4 | 2 | 1 | 1 | 22 | 5 | +17 | 7 | 5th place game |
| 4 | Chinese Taipei | 4 | 1 | 0 | 3 | 3 | 33 | −30 | 3 | 7th place game |
| 5 | Hong Kong | 4 | 0 | 0 | 4 | 2 | 32 | −30 | 0 | 9th place game |

Source: FIH
Rules for classification: 1) points; 2) goal difference; 3) goals scored; 4) head-to-head result.

19 August 2018
18:00

| Malaysia | 8–0 | Hong Kong |
|---|---|---|
| Abdul Rashid 3', 45', 58'; Zulkifli 16', 34'; Onn 32'; Sylvester 50'; Sumantri 59' | Report |

Umpires:
Cookie Tan (SGP)
Kim Yoon-seon (KOR)

23 August 2018
18:00

| Malaysia | 2–2 | China |
|---|---|---|
| Onn 33', 44' | Report | Liang 10'; Gu 49' |

Umpires:
Kelly Hudson (NZL)
Kim Yoon-seon (KOR)

25 August 2018
14:00

| Chinese Taipei | 0–11 | Malaysia |
|---|---|---|
| | Report | Abdul Rashid 4', 26', 40', 44', 56'; Mohd Ali 10'; Aziz 21', 52'; Sumantri 26'; Zulkifli 32'; Onn 51' |

Umpires:
Cookie Tan (SGP)
Ornpimol Kittiteerasopon (THA)

27 August 2018
20:00

| Malaysia | 1–3 | Japan |
|---|---|---|
| Zulkifli 47' | Report | Karino 21'; Nagai 38', 50' |

Umpires:
Suzi Sutton (USA)
Ayanna McClean (TTO)

Fifth place game

29 August 2018
15:00

| Malaysia | 2–0 | Thailand |
|---|---|---|
| Rashid 22'; Onn 54' | Report |

Umpires:
Cookie Tan (SGP)
Chen Mei-chen (TPE)

== Fencing ==
=== Men ===
| Athlete | Event | Preliminaries Pool | | Round of 32 | Round of 16 | Quarterfinals | Semi-finals | Finals | |
| Athlete | Event | Opponent Score | Seed | Opposition Score | Opposition Score | Opposition Score | Opposition Score | Opposition Score | Rank |
|---|---|---|---|---|---|---|---|---|---|
| Cheng Xin Han | Men's individual foil | Hoi Man Kit (MAC) W 5–4 | 3 Q | Kevin Jerrold Chan (SGP) L 8–15 | Did not advance | | | | |
| Cheng Xin Han | Men's individual foil | Kaliyev Tamirlan (KAZ) W 5–1 | 3 Q | Kevin Jerrold Chan (SGP) L 8–15 | Did not advance | | | | |
| Cheng Xin Han | Men's individual foil | Ou Fengming (TPE) L 1–5 | 3 Q | Kevin Jerrold Chan (SGP) L 8–15 | Did not advance | | | | |
| Cheng Xin Han | Men's individual foil | Nicholas Edward Choi (HKG) L 0–5 | 3 Q | Kevin Jerrold Chan (SGP) L 8–15 | Did not advance | | | | |
| Cheng Xin Han | Men's individual foil | Alquradaghi Ahmed (QAT) W 5–2 | 3 Q | Kevin Jerrold Chan (SGP) L 8–15 | Did not advance | | | | |
| Hans Yoong Wei Shen | Men's individual foil | Saito Toshiya (JPN) L 0–5 | 3 Q | Dennis Ariadinata Satriana (INA) L 8–15 | Did not advance | | | | |
| Hans Yoong Wei Shen | Men's individual foil | Mohammad Zulfikar (INA) W 5–3 | 3 Q | Dennis Ariadinata Satriana (INA) L 8–15 | Did not advance | | | | |
| Hans Yoong Wei Shen | Men's individual foil | Owaida Ali (QAT) W 5–2 | 3 Q | Dennis Ariadinata Satriana (INA) L 8–15 | Did not advance | | | | |
| Hans Yoong Wei Shen | Men's individual foil | Lama Sanjeep (NEP) W 5–0 | 3 Q | Dennis Ariadinata Satriana (INA) L 8–15 | Did not advance | | | | |
| Hans Yoong Wei Shen | Men's individual foil | Son Young Ki (KOR) L 4–5 | 3 Q | Dennis Ariadinata Satriana (INA) L 8–15 | Did not advance | | | | |
| Mohamad Roslan Mohamed | Men's individual épée | Alshatti Abdulaziz (KUW) W DNS | 4 Q | Kurbanov Ruslan (KAZ) L 9–15 | Did not advance | | | | |
| Mohamad Roslan Mohamed | Men's individual épée | Jung JinSun (KOR) L 0–5 | 4 Q | Kurbanov Ruslan (KAZ) L 9–15 | Did not advance | | | | |
| Mohamad Roslan Mohamed | Men's individual épée | Alshamari Mohamed (QAT) L 2–5 | 4 Q | Kurbanov Ruslan (KAZ) L 9–15 | Did not advance | | | | |
| Mohamad Roslan Mohamed | Men's individual épée | Bhatti Nazar Abbas (PAK) W 5–1 | 4 Q | Kurbanov Ruslan (KAZ) L 9–15 | Did not advance | | | | |
| Mohamad Roslan Mohamed | Men's individual épée | Alimov Fayzulla (UZB) W 5–1 | 4 Q | Kurbanov Ruslan (KAZ) L 9–15 | Did not advance | | | | |
| Mohamad Roslan Mohamed | Men's individual épée | Lan Minghao (CHN) W 4–5 | 4 Q | Kurbanov Ruslan (KAZ) L 9–15 | Did not advance | | | | |
| Koh I Jie | Men's individual épée | Bayarsaikhan Batkhuu (MGL) L 2–5 | 3 Q | Bayarsaikhan Batkhuu (MGL) W 15–9 | Minobe Kazuyasu (JPN) L 10–15 | Did not advance | | | |
| Koh I Jie | Men's individual épée | Sokolov Oleg (UZB) L 3–5 | 3 Q | Bayarsaikhan Batkhuu (MGL) W 15–9 | Minobe Kazuyasu (JPN) L 10–15 | Did not advance | | | |
| Koh I Jie | Men's individual épée | Alexanin Dmitriy (KAZ) L 4–5 | 3 Q | Bayarsaikhan Batkhuu (MGL) W 15–9 | Minobe Kazuyasu (JPN) L 10–15 | Did not advance | | | |
| Koh I Jie | Men's individual épée | Nguyen Phuoc Den (VIE) L 2–5 | 3 Q | Bayarsaikhan Batkhuu (MGL) W 15–9 | Minobe Kazuyasu (JPN) L 10–15 | Did not advance | | | |
| Koh I Jie | Men's individual épée | Siahaan Derry Renanda Putra (INA) W 5–1 | 3 Q | Bayarsaikhan Batkhuu (MGL) W 15–9 | Minobe Kazuyasu (JPN) L 10–15 | Did not advance | | | |
| Koh I Jie | Men's individual épée | Saeeduddin Ali (PAK) W 5–3 | 3 Q | Bayarsaikhan Batkhuu (MGL) W 15–9 | Minobe Kazuyasu (JPN) L 10–15 | Did not advance | | | |
| Syed Adam Emir Putra Syed Aidi Putra | Men's Individual Sabre | Vu Thanh An (VIE) L 2–5 | 6 | Did not advance | | | | | |
| Syed Adam Emir Putra Syed Aidi Putra | Men's Individual Sabre | Alssadi Nasr (QAT)L 4–5 | 6 | Did not advance | | | | | |
| Syed Adam Emir Putra Syed Aidi Putra | Men's Individual Sabre | Xu Yingming (CHN)L 0–5 | 6 | Did not advance | | | | | |
| Syed Adam Emir Putra Syed Aidi Putra | Men's Individual Sabre | Abedini Shormasti Mojtaba (IRI)L 4– | 6 | Did not advance | | | | | |
| Syed Adam Emir Putra Syed Aidi Putra | Men's Individual Sabre | Low Ho Tin (HKG)L 1–5 | 6 | Did not advance | | | | | |

=== Women ===
| Athlete | Event | Preliminaries Pool | | Round of 32 | Round of 16 | Quarterfinals | Semi-finals | Finals | |
| Athlete | Event | Opponent Score | Seed | Opposition Score | Opposition Score | Opposition Score | Opposition Score | Opposition Score | Rank |
|---|---|---|---|---|---|---|---|---|---|
| Tyanne Fong | Women's individual foil | Huo Xingxin (CHN); L 0–5 | 6 | Did not advance | | | | | |
| Tyanne Fong | Women's individual foil | Maxine Isabel Esteban (PHI); L 0–5 | 6 | Did not advance | | | | | |
| Tyanne Fong | Women's individual foil | Mery Ananda (INA); L 0–5 | 6 | Did not advance | | | | | |
| Tyanne Fong | Women's individual foil | Amita Marie Nicolette Berthier (SGP); L 0–5 | 6 | Did not advance | | | | | |
| Tyanne Fong | Women's individual foil | Sera Azuma (JPN); L 1–5 | 6 | Did not advance | | | | | |
| Goh Bee Hooi | Men's individual épée | Cheryl Lim (SGP); L 2–5 | 5 | Did not advance | | | | | |
| Goh Bee Hooi | Men's individual épée | Khamitova Abdyl Kamilia (KGZ); L 3–5 | 5 | Did not advance | | | | | |
| Goh Bee Hooi | Men's individual épée | Assel Alibekova (KAZ); L 3–5 | 5 | Did not advance | | | | | |
| Goh Bee Hooi | Men's individual épée | Sun Yiwen (CHN); L 3–5 | 5 | Did not advance | | | | | |
| Goh Bee Hooi | Men's individual épée | Anis Rohadatul Niehlah Riyati (INA); W 5–2 | 5 | Did not advance | | | | | |

== Football ==
Malaysia joined in the group E at the men's football event.

Summary

| Team | Event | Group stage | | | | Round of 16 | Quarterfinal | Semi-final | Final / BM | |
| Team | Event | Opposition Score | Opposition Score | Opposition Score | Rank | Opposition Score | Opposition Score | Opposition Score | Opposition Score | Rank |
|---|---|---|---|---|---|---|---|---|---|---|
| Malaysia men's | Men's tournament | Kyrgyzstan; W 3–1 | South Korea; W 2–1 | Bahrain; L 2–3 | 1 Q | Japan; L 0–1 | did not advance | | | 12 |

=== Men's tournament ===
Roster

The following is the Malaysia squad in the men's football tournament of the 2018 Asian Games. The team of 20 players was officially named on 12 August. Danial Amier Norhisham was replaced by Rodney Celvin on 13 August.

Head coach: (Malaysia) Ong Kim Swee

| No. | Pos. | Player | Date of birth (age) | Caps | Goals | Club |
|---|---|---|---|---|---|---|
| 1 | GK | Ifwat Akmal | 10 August 1996 (aged 22) | | | (Football Association of Malaysia) Kedah |
| 22 | GK | Haziq Nadzli | 6 January 1998 (aged 20) | | | (Football Association of Malaysia) Johor Darul Ta'zim |
| 2 | DF | Adib Zainudin | 15 February 1995 (aged 23) | | | (Football Association of Malaysia) Johor Darul Ta'zim II |
| 3 | DF | Syazwan Bahari | 24 February 1995 (aged 23) | | | (Football Association of Malaysia) Perak |
| 4 | DF | Rodney Celvin | 25 November 1996 (aged 21) | | | (Football Association of Malaysia) PKNS |
| 9 | DF | Adam Nor Azlin (vice-captain) | 5 January 1996 (aged 22) | | | (Football Association of Malaysia) Johor Darul Ta'zim |
| 14 | DF | Dominic Tan | 12 March 1997 (aged 21) | | | (Football Association of Malaysia) Johor Darul Ta'zim |
| 15 | DF | Rizal Ghazali* | 1 October 1992 (aged 25) | | | (Football Association of Malaysia) Kedah |
| 17 | DF | Irfan Zakaria | 4 June 1995 (aged 23) | | | (Football Association of Malaysia) Kuala Lumpur |
| 21 | DF | Syazwan Andik | 4 August 1996 (aged 22) | | | (Football Association of Malaysia) Kuala Lumpur |
| 5 | MF | Syahmi Safari | 5 February 1998 (aged 20) | | | (Football Association of Malaysia) Selangor |
| 7 | MF | Baddrol Bakhtiar* (captain) | 1 February 1988 (aged 30) | | | (Football Association of Malaysia) Kedah |
| 8 | MF | Faisal Halim | 7 January 1998 (aged 20) | | | (Football Association of Malaysia) Pahang |
| 13 | MF | Tommy Mawat Bada | 26 June 1995 (aged 23) | | | (Football Association of Malaysia) PJ Rangers |
| 16 | MF | Nik Akif | 11 May 1999 (aged 19) | | | (Football Association of Malaysia) Kelantan U21 |
| 10 | FW | Hadi Fayyadh | 22 January 2000 (aged 18) | | | (Football Association of Malaysia) Johor Darul Ta'zim II |
| 11 | FW | Safawi Rasid | 5 March 1997 (aged 21) | | | (Football Association of Malaysia) Johor Darul Ta'zim |
| 18 | FW | Akhyar Rashid | 1 May 1999 (aged 19) | | | (Football Association of Malaysia) Kedah |
| 19 | FW | Kogileswaran Raj | 21 September 1998 (aged 19) | | | (Football Association of Malaysia) Pahang |
| 20 | FW | Syafiq Ahmad | 28 June 1995 (aged 23) | | | (Football Association of Malaysia) Johor Darul Ta'zim |

* Over-aged player.

Group E

| Pos | Team | Pld | W | D | L | GF | GA | GD | Pts | Qualification |
|---|---|---|---|---|---|---|---|---|---|---|
| 1 | Malaysia | 3 | 2 | 0 | 1 | 7 | 5 | +2 | 6 (Note: Head-to-head result: Malaysia 2–1 South Korea.) | Advance to knockout stage |
| 2 | South Korea | 3 | 2 | 0 | 1 | 8 | 2 | +6 | 6 | Advance to knockout stage |
| 3 | Bahrain | 3 | 1 | 1 | 1 | 5 | 10 | −5 | 4 | Advance to knockout stage |
| 4 | Kyrgyzstan | 3 | 0 | 1 | 2 | 3 | 6 | −3 | 1 | |
| 5 | United Arab Emirates | 0 | 0 | 0 | 0 | 0 | 0 | 0 | 0 | Redrawn to Group C |

Source: Asian Games 2018
Rules for classification: Group stage tiebreakers
Notes:
15 August 2018
16:00 UTC+7

| Kyrgyzstan | 1–3 | Malaysia |
|---|---|---|
| Batyrkanov 55' | Report | Safawi 38' (pen.); Akhyar 60'; Syafiq 78' |

Jalak Harupat Stadium, Soreang
Referee: Lau Fong Hei (Hong Kong)

17 August 2018
19:00 UTC+7

| Malaysia | 2–1 | South Korea |
|---|---|---|
| Safawi 5', 45+1' | Report | Hwang Ui-jo 87' |

Jalak Harupat Stadium, Soreang
Referee: Mohammed Al-Hoaish (Saudi Arabia)

20 August 2018
19:00 UTC+7

| Malaysia | 2–3 | Bahrain |
|---|---|---|
| Syahmi 20'; Safawi 90+3' (pen.) | Report | Al-Hardan 33', 89'; Al-Shamsan 37' |

Wibawa Mukti Stadium, Cikarang
Referee: Yu Ming-hsun (Chinese Taipei)

Round of 16

24 August 2018
19:30 UTC+7

| Malaysia | 0–1 | Japan |
|---|---|---|
| | Report | Ueda 90' (pen.) |

Patriot Candrabhaga Stadium, Bekasi
Referee: Bijan Heidari (Iran)

== Golf ==
| Athlete | Event | Round 1 | | Round 2 | | Round 3 | | Round 4/ Final | |
| Athlete | Event | Score | Rank | Score | Rank | Score | Rank | Score | Rank |
|---|---|---|---|---|---|---|---|---|---|
| Adam Arif Madzri | Men's Individual | 80 | =61 | 75 | 54 | 74 | =46 | 72 | =41 |
| Ervin Chang | Men's Individual | 69 | =2 | 73 | =13 | 71 | =10 | 49 | 28 |
| Muhammad Afif | Men's Individual | 79 | =56 | 68 | =27 | 73 | =32 | 75 | =32 |
| Rhaasrikanesh Kanavathi | Men's Individual | 74 | =27 | 82 | =53 | 73 | =46 | 75 | =44 |
| Adam Arif Madzri; Ervin Chang; Muhammad Afif; Rhaasrikanesh Kanavathi | Men's Team | 222 | 9 | 216 | 8 | 217 | 10 | 222 | 10 |
| Ashley Lau Jen Wen | Women's Individual | 72 | =12 | 71 | =12 | 70 | =8 | 74 | 13 |
| Natasha Andrea Onn | Women's Individual | 72 | =12 | 74 | =18 | 75 | =20 | 74 | =22 |
| Ng Yu Xuen | Women's Individual | 79 | =30 | 74 | =29 | 75 | =29 | 79 | 31 |
| Ashley Lau Jen Wen; Natasha Andrea Onn; Ng Yu Xuen | Women's Team | 144 | 7 | 145 | =7 | 145 | 8 | 148 | 9 |

== Gymnastic ==
=== Artistic ===
Team Final & Individual Qualification

==== Men ====
| Athlete | Event | Floor (gymnastics) | | Pommel horse | | Rings (gymnastics) | | Vault (gymnastics) | | Parallel bars | | Horizontal bar | | Total All-Around | |
| Athlete | Event | Score | Rank | Score | Rank | Score | Rank | Score | Rank | Score | Rank | Score | Rank | Score | Rank |
|---|---|---|---|---|---|---|---|---|---|---|---|---|---|---|---|
| Azrol Amierol Jaafar | All-around | 12.500 | 25 | 6.850 | 55 | 12.600 | =42 | 13.125 | 17 | 12.200 | 41 | 12.200 | =31 | 69.750 | 23 |
| Tan Fu Jie | All-around | 12.400 | 30 | 12.350 | 28 | N/A | | | | | | | | | |
| Zul Bahrin Mat Asri | All-around | 11.550 | 46 | N/A | | 12.150 | 45 | N/A | | 11.650 | 48 | 9.700 | 54 | N/A | |
| Loo Phay Xing | All-around | 11.250 | 50 | 13.350 | 16 | 12.250 | 44 | N/A | | 13.050 | 28 | 12.65 | 25 | 76.550 | 14 |
| Chau Jern Rong | All-around | N/A | | 11.000 | 37 | 13.100 | 31 | N/A | | 12.250 | 40 | 12.850 | 22 | N/A | |
| Total | Team all-around | N/A | | | | | | | | | | | | 226.25 | 10 |

==== Women ====
| Athlete | Event | Vault (gymnastics) | | Uneven bars | | Balance beam | | Floor (gymnastics) | | Total All-Around | | Final | | | | | |
| Athlete | Event | Vault (gymnastics) | | Uneven bars | | Balance beam | | Floor (gymnastics) | | Total All-Around | | Uneven bars | | Balance beam | | Floor (gymnastics) | |
| Athlete | Event | Score | Rank | Score | Rank | Score | Rank | Score | Rank | Score | Rank | Score | Rank | Score | Rank | Score | Rank |
|---|---|---|---|---|---|---|---|---|---|---|---|---|---|---|---|---|---|
| Tan Ing Yueh | All-around | 12.975 | 10 | 11.250 | 26 | 12.050 | 18 | 12.600 | 7 | 49.200 | 10 | N/A | | | | 12.450 | 6 |
| Farah Ann Abdul Hadi | All-around | N/A | | 13.150 | 9 | 12.300 | 13 | 12.550 | 9 | 51.200 | 7 Q | 13.200 | 5 | N/A | | | |
| Tracie Ang | All-around | N/A | | 9.800 | 40 | 11.350 | 31 | 11.250 | 31 | N/A | | | | | | | |
| Total | Team all-around | N/A | | | | | | | | 145.500 | 6 Q | 140.100 | | | 6 | | |

=== Rhythmic ===
==== Team Final and Individual Qualification ====
| Athlete | Event | Hoop (rhythmic gymnastics) | Ball (rhythmic gymnastics) | Clubs (rhythmic gymnastics) | Ribbon (rhythmic gymnastics) | Total All-Around | | Final | |
| Athlete | Event | Score | Score | Score | Score | Score | Rank | Score | Rank |
|---|---|---|---|---|---|---|---|---|---|
| Dict Weng Kuan | All-around | 12.750 | 12.200 | 12.200 | 12.250 | 37.200 | 19 | did not advance | |
| Izzah Amzan | All-around | 14.550 | 14.450 | 11.450 | 10.550 | 40.450 | 14 Q | 54.600 | 10 |
| Sie Yan Koi | All-around | 13.000 | 13.050 | 13.650 | 11.000 | 39.700 | 15 Q | 53.550 | 12 |
| Total | Team all-around | N/A | | | | 129.550 | 7 | 129.550 | 7 |

== Handball ==
Malaysia men's team will compete at the Games in group A, while the women's team in group B. It was the first time in Asian Games history Malaysia compete in the sport.

Summary

Key:

- ET – After extra time
- P – Match decided by penalty-shootout.

| Team | Event | Preliminary | Standing | Main / Class. | Rank / standing | Semi-finals / Pl. | Final / BM / Pl. | |
| Team | Event | Opposition score | Standing | Opposition score | Rank / standing | Opposition score | Opposition score | Rank |
|---|---|---|---|---|---|---|---|---|
| Malaysia men's | Men's tournament | Group A Qatar: L 11–64; Iran: L 11–55 | 3 | Group III; India: L 45–19; Chinese Taipei: L 19–34; Indonesia: L 22–31; Pakistan: L24–47 | 13 | did not advance | | |
| Malaysia women's | Women's tournament | Group B Indonesia: L 15–23; Japan: L 3–64; Thailand:L12–40; Hong Kong:L15–40 | 5 | —N/a | | Did not advance | India; L 19–54 | 10 |

=== Men's tournament ===
Roster

- Najhan Bohari
- Mohammad Izzat Muhammad Abdul Karim
- Dzulfiqar Ismail
- Nabil Abdul Razak
- Fazrin Jamaluddin
- Ammar Safwan Nadzarudin
- Koh Chan Seng
- Faizan Damanhuri
- Ridzuan Mohd Razali
- Salman Sayyidi Hamzah
- Mohd Uzair Zubli
- Khairul Amirul Abdullah
- Ahmad Zaidi Rosdi
- Solihin Mustafa Kamal
- Amirul Ikram Abdul Razak
- Fikree Azman

Group A

| Pos | Team | Pld | W | D | L | GF | GA | GD | Pts | Qualification |
|---|---|---|---|---|---|---|---|---|---|---|
| 1 | Qatar | 2 | 2 | 0 | 0 | 99 | 31 | +68 | 4 | Main round / Group 1–2 |
| 2 | Iran | 2 | 1 | 0 | 1 | 75 | 46 | +29 | 2 | Main round / Group 1–2 |
| 3 | Malaysia | 2 | 0 | 0 | 2 | 22 | 119 | −97 | 0 | Main round / Group 3 |

Source: AHF

| 13 August; 16:00 | Malaysia | 11–64 | Qatar | POPKI Sports Hall, Jakarta; Referees: Shakir, Kadhim (IRQ) |
| 13 August; 16:00 | Ismail, Kamal 3 | (7–33) | Zouaoui 18 | POPKI Sports Hall, Jakarta; Referees: Shakir, Kadhim (IRQ) |
| 13 August; 16:00 | 2× (yellow card) 1× (suspension) | | | POPKI Sports Hall, Jakarta; Referees: Shakir, Kadhim (IRQ) |

| 15 August; 11:00 | Iran | 55–11 | Malaysia | POPKI Sports Hall, Jakarta; Referees: Li, Ke (CHN) |
| 15 August; 11:00 | Barbat 11 | (29–5) | A. Abdul Razak 3 | POPKI Sports Hall, Jakarta; Referees: Li, Ke (CHN) |
| 15 August; 11:00 | 1× (yellow card) 1× (suspension) | | 1× (yellow card) 2× (suspension) | POPKI Sports Hall, Jakarta; Referees: Li, Ke (CHN) |

Classification round (9–13)

| Pos | Team | Pld | W | D | L | GF | GA | GD | Pts |
|---|---|---|---|---|---|---|---|---|---|
| 1 | Chinese Taipei | 4 | 4 | 0 | 0 | 142 | 95 | +47 | 8 |
| 2 | India | 4 | 3 | 0 | 1 | 141 | 104 | +37 | 6 |
| 3 | Pakistan | 4 | 2 | 0 | 2 | 134 | 111 | +23 | 4 |
| 4 | Indonesia | 4 | 1 | 0 | 3 | 96 | 124 | −28 | 2 |
| 5 | Malaysia | 4 | 0 | 0 | 4 | 78 | 157 | −79 | 0 |

Source: AHF

| 20 August; 11:00 | India | 45–19 | Malaysia | POPKI Sports Hall, Jakarta; Referees: Li, Ke (CHN) |
| 20 August; 11:00 | D. Singh 13 | (25–8) | Abdul Karim, Jamaluddin 4 | POPKI Sports Hall, Jakarta; Referees: Li, Ke (CHN) |
| 20 August; 11:00 | 1× (yellow card) 2× (suspension) | | 4× (suspension) | POPKI Sports Hall, Jakarta; Referees: Li, Ke (CHN) |

| 21 August; 11:00 | Chinese Taipei | 34–13 | Malaysia | POPKI Sports Hall, Jakarta; Referees: Lee, Koo (KOR) |
| 21 August; 11:00 | Liu 9 | (19–6) | Abdul Karim, Ismail 3 | POPKI Sports Hall, Jakarta; Referees: Lee, Koo (KOR) |
| 21 August; 11:00 | 2× (yellow card) | | 1× (yellow card) 3× (suspension) | POPKI Sports Hall, Jakarta; Referees: Lee, Koo (KOR) |

| 26 August; 14:00 | Indonesia | 31–22 | Malaysia | POPKI Sports Hall, Jakarta; Referees: Li, Ke (CHN) |
| 26 August; 14:00 | Bagas 10 | (15–8) | Ismail 4 | POPKI Sports Hall, Jakarta; Referees: Li, Ke (CHN) |
| 26 August; 14:00 | 1× (yellow card) 1× (suspension) | | 1× (yellow card) 4× (suspension) | POPKI Sports Hall, Jakarta; Referees: Li, Ke (CHN) |

| 29 August; 18:00 | Malaysia | 24–47 | Pakistan | POPKI Sports Hall, Jakarta; Referees: Al-Marhoon, Al-Mawt (BHR) |
| 29 August; 18:00 | Jamaluddin 6 | (9–21) | N. Hussain, M. Hussain 11 | POPKI Sports Hall, Jakarta; Referees: Al-Marhoon, Al-Mawt (BHR) |
| 29 August; 18:00 | 2× (yellow card) 3× (suspension) | | 1× (yellow card) | POPKI Sports Hall, Jakarta; Referees: Al-Marhoon, Al-Mawt (BHR) |

=== Women's tournament ===
Roster

- Nurul Hafizah Mispani
- Norsyamimi Wan Mohd Nazri
- Nur Alia Saimi
- Nur Shaidatul Mohd Zubaidi
- Noor Haninah Hasri
- Nur Amira Wahid
- Farah Atifah Ahmad Yusop
- Aqilah Hasya Haris Fadzillah
- Nurul irdina Yazid
- Dharshiniy N Sivan
- Nurfarahiyah Yusri
- Siti Zubaidah Mohd Salleh
- Nor Shuhada Zahari
- Nur Atikah Azman
- Nurshahira Abd Rahman
- Nur Asyiqin Rasdi

Group B

| Pos | Team | Pld | W | D | L | GF | GA | GD | Pts | Qualification |
|---|---|---|---|---|---|---|---|---|---|---|
| 1 | Japan | 4 | 4 | 0 | 0 | 208 | 38 | +170 | 8 | Semifinals |
| 2 | Thailand | 4 | 3 | 0 | 1 | 120 | 93 | +27 | 6 | Semifinals |
| 3 | Hong Kong | 4 | 2 | 0 | 2 | 112 | 97 | +15 | 4 | Classification 5th–8th |
| 4 | Indonesia | 4 | 1 | 0 | 3 | 56 | 146 | −90 | 2 | Classification 5th–8th |
| 5 | Malaysia | 4 | 0 | 0 | 4 | 45 | 167 | −122 | 0 | Classification 9th–10th |

Source: AHF

| 14 August; 18:00 | Malaysia | 15–23 | Indonesia | POPKI Sports Hall, Jakarta; Referees: Al-Saqer, Al-Suqufi (KSA) |
| 14 August; 18:00 | Yusri 4 | (9–12) | Apriliani 7 | POPKI Sports Hall, Jakarta; Referees: Al-Saqer, Al-Suqufi (KSA) |
| 14 August; 18:00 | 2× (yellow card) 8× (suspension) 1× (red card) | | 3× (yellow card) 2× (suspension) | POPKI Sports Hall, Jakarta; Referees: Al-Saqer, Al-Suqufi (KSA) |

| 19 August; 14:00 | Japan | 64–3 | Malaysia | POPKI Sports Hall, Jakarta; Referees: Li, Ke (CHN) |
| 19 August; 14:00 | Kawata 10 | (32–2) | Yusop 2 | POPKI Sports Hall, Jakarta; Referees: Li, Ke (CHN) |
| 19 August; 14:00 | | | 2× (suspension) | POPKI Sports Hall, Jakarta; Referees: Li, Ke (CHN) |

| 21 August; 16:00 | Malaysia | 12–40 | Thailand | POPKI Sports Hall, Jakarta; Referees: Li, Ke (CHN) |
| 21 August; 16:00 | five players 2 | (5–24) | Yaemyim 11 | POPKI Sports Hall, Jakarta; Referees: Li, Ke (CHN) |
| 21 August; 16:00 | 7× (suspension) 1× (red card) | | | POPKI Sports Hall, Jakarta; Referees: Li, Ke (CHN) |

| 23 August; 11:00 | Malaysia | 15–40 | Hong Kong | POPKI Sports Hall, Jakarta; Referees: Al-Saqer, Al-Suqufi (KSA) |
| 23 August; 11:00 | Saimi 5 | (9–23) | Cheung M. 7 | POPKI Sports Hall, Jakarta; Referees: Al-Saqer, Al-Suqufi (KSA) |
| 23 August; 11:00 | 2× (yellow card) 3× (suspension) | | | POPKI Sports Hall, Jakarta; Referees: Al-Saqer, Al-Suqufi (KSA) |

Ninth place game

| 25 August; 14:00 | India | 54–19 | Malaysia | POPKI Sports Hall, Jakarta; Referees: Ota, Shimajiri (JPN) |
| 25 August; 14:00 | D. Thakur, Gupta, Devi 8 | (19–5) | Yusop 7 | POPKI Sports Hall, Jakarta; Referees: Ota, Shimajiri (JPN) |
| 25 August; 14:00 | 2× (yellow card) 4× (suspension) | | 2× (yellow card) 6× (suspension) | POPKI Sports Hall, Jakarta; Referees: Ota, Shimajiri (JPN) |

== Jetski ==
=== Mixed ===
| Athlete | Event | Final | | | | | | | |
| Athlete | Event | Score | Rank | Score | Rank | Score | Rank | Score | Rank |
|---|---|---|---|---|---|---|---|---|---|
| Saifullah Al Aziz Nazar | Runabout 1100 Stock | 33 | 7 | 30 | 8 | 36 | 6 | 43 | 4 |
| Tee Chen Jet | Runabout 1100 Stock | 27 | 9 | 39 | 5 | 24 | 10 | 33 | 7 |
| Tee Chen Jet | Runabout Limited | DNR | | | | | | | |

== Judo ==
Malaysia will compete at the Games with one judoka.

Men

| Athlete | Event | Round of 32 | Round of 16 | Quarterfinals | Semi-finals | Repechage | Final/BM | Rank |
| Athlete | Event | Opposition Result | Opposition Result | Opposition Result | Opposition Result | Opposition Result | Opposition Result | Rank |
|---|---|---|---|---|---|---|---|---|
| Chong Wei Fu | 66 kg | Shugen Nakano (PHI); L 0–10 | Did not advance | | | | | |

== Kabaddi ==
Summary

| Team | Event | Group stage | | | | | | Semifinal | Final | |
| Team | Event | Opposition score | Opposition score | Opposition score | Opposition score | Opposition score | Rank | Opposition score | Opposition score | Rank |
|---|---|---|---|---|---|---|---|---|---|---|
| Malaysia men's | Men | Pakistan; L 17−62 | Japan; L 20−30 | Indonesia; L 22−30 | Iran; L 24−58 | Nepal; L 17−29 | 6 | Did not advance | | 11 |

=== Men's tournament ===
Team roster

- Prabhakaran Mani
- Dinesh Tamilselvam
- Allexson Lian Sin
- Ganga Tharen Thana Seelan
- Thanaselan Nadarajan
- Tavitaran Nedunjilan
- Vimalanathan Pavadai
- Devan Munisvaran
- Prabakaran Maksvaran
- Dinishwaran Markandan
- Logean Ravindran
- Sasikumar Manimaran

Group B

| Pos | Team | Pld | W | D | L | PF | PA | PD | Pts | Qualification |
|---|---|---|---|---|---|---|---|---|---|---|
| 1 | Iran | 5 | 5 | 0 | 0 | 289 | 109 | +180 | 10 | Semifinals |
| 2 | Pakistan | 5 | 4 | 0 | 1 | 185 | 98 | +87 | 8 | Semifinals |
| 3 | Indonesia | 5 | 3 | 0 | 2 | 132 | 182 | −50 | 6 | |
| 4 | Japan | 5 | 2 | 0 | 3 | 121 | 162 | −41 | 4 | |
| 5 | Nepal | 5 | 1 | 0 | 4 | 127 | 194 | −67 | 2 | |
| 6 | Malaysia | 5 | 0 | 0 | 5 | 100 | 209 | −109 | 0 | |

Source: OCA

19 August
17:00

| Malaysia | 17–62 (HT: 4–32) | Pakistan |

Garuda Theatre, Jakarta

20 August
15:00

| Japan | 30–20 (HT: 21–9) | Malaysia |

Garuda Theatre, Jakarta

21 August
14:00

| Indonesia | 30–22 (HT: 15–11) | Malaysia |

Garuda Theatre, Jakarta

21 August
18:00

| Iran | 58–24 (HT: 36–10) | Malaysia |

Garuda Theatre, Jakarta

22 August
17:00

| Malaysia | 17–29 (HT: 10–12) | Nepal |

Garuda Theatre, Jakarta

== Karate ==
=== Men ===
| Athlete | Event | 1/16 Final | 1/8 Final | Repechage | Quarterfinal | Semi-final/ Repechage | Final/Bronze Medal Match | Rank |
| Athlete | Event | Opposition score | Opposition score | Opposition score | Opposition score | Opposition score | Opposition score | Rank |
|---|---|---|---|---|---|---|---|---|
| Mohamad Haznil Henry | Men's Kata | N/A | Mohammad Hussain (KUW); L 2–3 | did not advance | | | | |
| Prem Kumar Selvam | Men's 60 kg | Bye | Phonepaseuth Lasasimma (LAO); W 7–0 | N/A | Prasanga Sandaruwan (SRI); W 3–1 | Rifki Ardiansyah (INA); L 4–4 | Lee Chun Ho (HKG); W 5–0 | 3rd place, bronze medalist(s) |
| Sharmendran Raghonathan | Men's 75 kg | Daisuke Watanabe (JPN); W 3–1 | Seilapanha Kak (LAO); W 9–1 | N/A | Ghulam Abbas Saadi (PAK); L 5–10 | did not advance | | |

=== Women ===
| Athlete | Event | 1/16 Final | 1/8 Final | Repechage | Quarterfinal | Semi-final/ Repechage | Final/Bronze Medal Match | Rank |
| Athlete | Event | Opposition score | Opposition score | Opposition score | Opposition score | Opposition score | Opposition score | Rank |
|---|---|---|---|---|---|---|---|---|
| Celine Lee Xin Yi | Women's Kata | N/A | Wahidah Kamarul Zaman (BRU); W 5–0 | N/A | Monsicha Tararattanakul (THA); L 2–3 | did not advance | | |
| Madhuri Poovanesan | Women's 50 kg | N/A | Moldir Zhangbyrbay (KAZ); L 0–2 | did not advance | | | | |
| Syakilla Salni | Women's 55 kg | N/A | Wen Tzu-yun (TPE); L 1–1 | Sabina Zakharova (KAZ); W 2–0 | N/A | | Wong Sok I (MAC); L 2–3 | 4 |

== Paragliding ==
=== Accuracy ===
| Athlete | Event | Rounds | | | | | | | | | | | | | | | | | | | | Rank |
| Athlete | Event | 1 | | 2 | | 3 | | 4 | | 5 | | 6 | | 7 | | 8 | | 9 | | 10 | | Rank |
| Athlete | Event | Score | Rank | Score | Rank | Score | Rank | Score | Rank | Score | Rank | Score | Rank | Score | Rank | Score | Rank | Score | Rank | Score | Rank | Rank |
|---|---|---|---|---|---|---|---|---|---|---|---|---|---|---|---|---|---|---|---|---|---|---|
| Mohd Nazri Sulaiman | Men's Individual | 22 | 5 | 4 | 4 | 42 | 5 | 10 | 3 | 7 | 5 | 43 | =6 | 57 | 4 | 179 | 5 | 223 | 7 | 3 | 7 | 7 |
| Mohd Faizal Abdul Wahab | Men's Individual | 102 | 6 | 31 | 10 | 7 | =8 | 13 | 5 | 1 | 6 | 5 | =3 | 123 | 5 | 10 | 4 | 2 | 4 | 43 | 4 | 4 |
| Malaysia's Men Team | Men's Team | 867 | 5 | 410 | 5 | 123 | 4 | 206 | 4 | 18 | 3 | 559 | 4 | N/A | | | | | | | | 4 |
| Asjanita Aini Abu Hassan | Women's Individual | 496 | 11 | 500 | 13 | 53 | 12 | 500 | 14 | 269 | 14 | 472 | 14 | 215 | 14 | 55 | 12 | 73 | 11 | 179 | 11 | 11 |
| Sharifah Nadiah Wafa | Women's Individual | 17 | 5 | 500 | 8 | 500 | 10 | 219 | 9 | 500 | 13 | 237 | 13 | 228 | 11 | 405 | 13 | 379 | 13 | 7 | 13 | 13 |
| Malaysia's Women Team | Women's Team | 700 | 4 | 1500 | 5 | 704 | 6 | 725 | 4 | 1269 | 5 | 1209 | 6 | N/A | | | | | | | | 6 |

=== Cross-Country ===
| Athlete | Event | Rounds | | | | | | | | | | Rank |
| Athlete | Event | 1 | | 2 | | 3 | | 4 | | 5 | | Rank |
| Athlete | Event | Score | Rank | Score | Rank | Score | Rank | Score | Rank | Score | Rank | Rank |
|---|---|---|---|---|---|---|---|---|---|---|---|---|
| Malaysia's Men Team | Men's Team | 1167 | 6 | 827 | 5 | 1496 | 6 | 1246 | 5 | 1388 | 5 | 5 |
| Malaysia's Women Team | Women's Team | 202 | =5 | 314 | 6 | 467 | 5 | 217 | 5 | 248 | 5 | 5 |

== Pencak silat ==
=== Men ===
| Athlete | Event | Qualification | Round of 16 | Quarterfinal | Semi-final | Final | Rank |
| Athlete | Event | Rank | Opposition score | Opposition score | Opposition score | Opposition score | Rank |
|---|---|---|---|---|---|---|---|
| Muhammad Afifi Nordin | Men's Single | 450; 7 | —N/a | | | Did not advance | 7 |
| Mohd Taqiyuddin Hamid; Muhammad Afifi Nordin | Men's double | —N/a | | | | 560 | 3rd place, bronze medalist(s) |
| Mohd Juned Abdullah; Muhammad Syafiq Ibrahim; Sazlan Yuga | Men's Team | —N/a | | | | 446 | 4 |
| Muhammad Faizul M Nasir | 50kg–55kg | —N/a | Bye | Adnan (PAK); W 5–0 | Dines Dumaan (PHI); W 5–0 | Abdul Malik (INA); L 0–5 | 2nd place, silver medalist(s) |
| Mohamad Hazim Amzad | 55kg–60kg | —N/a | Bye | Silvestre (TLS); W 5–0 | Nguyễn Thái Linh (VIE); L 0–5 | Did not advance | 3rd place, bronze medalist(s) |
| Mohamad Zarish Hakim Shukor | 60kg–65kg | —N/a | Bye | Iqbal Candra (INA); L 0–5 | did not advance | | |
| Mohd Al Jufferi Jamari | 65kg–70kg | —N/a | Alvin Campos (PHI); W 5–0 | Akbar Kiyaniyan (IRI); W 5–0 | Zholdoshbek Akimkanov (KGZ); W W/O | Komang Harik Adi Putra (INA); L 1–4 | 2nd place, silver medalist(s) |
| Mohd Fauzi Khalid | 70kg–75kg | —N/a | Bye | Johnny Vongphakdy (LAO); W 5–0 | Amri Rusdana (INA); W 3–2 | Trần Đình Nam (VIE); L 0–5 | 2nd place, silver medalist(s) |
| Muhammad Robial Sobri | 85kg–90kg | —N/a | Bye | Pimpirat Tonkhieo (THA); W 4–1 | Sheik Firdous (SGP); L 0–5 | Did not advance | 3rd place, bronze medalist(s) |
| Mohd Khaizul Yaacob | 90kg–95kg | —N/a | Bye | Mohammad Mortazi (IRI); W 5–0 | Tachin Pokjay (THA); W 5–0 | Nguyen Van Tri (VIE); L 0–5 | 2nd place, silver medalist(s) |

=== Women ===
| Athlete | Event | Qualification | Round of 16 | Quarterfinal | Semi-final | Final | Rank |
| Athlete | Event | Rank | Opposition score | Opposition score | Opposition score | Opposition score | Rank |
|---|---|---|---|---|---|---|---|
| Norshahirah Ratius | Women's Single | 440; 7 | —N/a | | | did not advance | 7 |
| Nor Hamizah Abu Hassan; Nur Syazreen A Malik | Women's double | —N/a | | | | 558 | 3rd place, bronze medalist(s) |
| Norshahirah Ratius; Nuraisyah Shamsul Bahrin; Siti Nur Khairunnisa Hail | Women's Team | —N/a | | | | 443 | 6 |
| Siti Shazwana Ajak | 55kg–60kg | —N/a | Nazanin (IRI); W 5–0 | Sarah Tria Monita (INA); L 0–5 | did not advance | | |
| Siti Rahmah Mohamed Nasir | 60kg–65kg | —N/a | Bye | Nguyen Thi Cam Nhi (VIE); L 0–5 | did not advance | | |

== Roller sports ==
=== Skateboarding ===
| Athlete | Event | Preliminary | | Finals | |
| Athlete | Event | Result | Rank | Result | Rank |
|---|---|---|---|---|---|
| Ian Nuriman Amri | Men's park | 49.00 | 9 | Did not advance | |
| Yaziru Amirul Basyir Zainordin | Men's Street | 21.8 | 6 Q | 17.3 | 7 |
| Ian Nuriman Amri | Men's Street | 17.8 | 12 | Did not advance | |
| Fatin Syahirah Roszizi | Women's Street | —N/a | | 5.4 | 8 |
| Cristina Grace Lai | Women's Park | —N/a | | DNS | |

=== Speed skating ===
| Athlete | Event | Time | Result | Rank |
|---|---|---|---|---|
| Mohamad Hazim Shahrum | Men's road 20 km race | DNF | | |

== Rowing ==
| Athlete | Event | Heats | | Repechages | | Finals | |
| Athlete | Event | Time | Rank | Time | Rank | Time | Rank |
|---|---|---|---|---|---|---|---|
| Muhammad Khairuddin Azwi | Men's Single Sculls | 9:17:55 | 11 R | 8:37:41 | 10 Q | 8:24:49 | 12 |
| Mohamad Amirul Norhadi | Men's lwt single scull | 8:00:89 | 8 R | 8:35:13 | 6 Q | 7:45:35 | 8 |

== Rugby sevens ==
Malaysia men's team has been placed in group B at the Games.

| Team | Event | Group stage | | | | Quarterfinal | Semifinal / Pl. | Final / BM / Pl. | |
| Team | Event | Opposition score | Opposition score | Opposition score | Rank | Opposition score | Opposition score | Opposition score | Rank |
|---|---|---|---|---|---|---|---|---|---|
| Malaysia men's | Men's tournament | Chinese Taipei; W 17–10 | Japan; L 0–47 | Indonesia; W 39–5 | 2 Q | South Korea; L 5–40 | Thailand; W 33–12 | China; W 12–7 | 5 |

=== Men's tournament ===
Squad

The following is the Malaysia squad in the men's rugby sevens tournament of the 2018 Asian Games.

Head coach: Mohd Saizul Hafifi Md Noor

- Mohamad Safwan Abdullah
- Zulkiflee Azmi
- Muhammad Nasharuddin Ismail
- Wan Izzuddin Ismail
- Muhammad Siddiq Amir Jalil
- Muhammad Azwan Zuwairi Mat Zizi
- Muhammad Dzafran Asyraaf Muhamad Zainudin
- Amalul Hazim Nasarrudin
- Mohamad Khairul Abdillah Ramli
- Muhammad Zulhisham Rasli
- Muhamad Firdaus Tarmizi
- Muhammad Ameer Nasrun Zulkeffli

Group B

| Pos | Team | Pld | W | D | L | PF | PA | PD | Pts | Qualification |
|---|---|---|---|---|---|---|---|---|---|---|
| 1 | Japan | 3 | 3 | 0 | 0 | 170 | 0 | +170 | 9 | Quarterfinals |
| 2 | Malaysia | 3 | 2 | 0 | 1 | 56 | 62 | −6 | 7 | Quarterfinals |
| 3 | Chinese Taipei | 3 | 1 | 0 | 2 | 51 | 74 | −23 | 5 | Quarterfinals |
| 4 | Indonesia | 3 | 0 | 0 | 3 | 31 | 172 | −141 | 3 | Ranking round 9–12 |

Source: Results

30 August
13:12

| Malaysia | 17–10 | Chinese Taipei |
| Try: Zulkifli 7+' m Azmi 10' m Nasarrudin 13' c Con: Mat Zizi (0/2); Asyraff (1/1) | | Try: Hsieh 1' m Lo 6' m Con: Huang P. (0/2) |

Gelora Bung Karno Rugby Field, Jakarta
Referee: Matthew Rodden (New Zealand)

30 August
17:14

| Japan | 47–0 | Malaysia |
| Try: Hashino (2) 2' c, 12' c Hayashi 6' c Sakai (2) 7' c, 14' m Ozawa 9' c Kano 13' c Con: Sakai (5/6); Hashino (1/1) |

Gelora Bung Karno Rugby Field, Jakarta
Referee: Charlie Brown (Ireland)

31 August
13:34

| Malaysia | 39–5 | Indonesia |
| Try: Azmi 2' m Ismail 5' m Nasarrudin (2) 6' c, 8' m Zulkifli (2) 12' c, 14' m Tarmizi 14+' m Con: Mat Zizi (1/4); Asyraff (1/3) | | Try: Oloan 10' m Con: Oiyaitou (0/1) |

Gelora Bung Karno Rugby Field, Jakarta
Referee: Suguru Kamamuta (Japan)

Quarterfinal

31 August
17:58

| South Korea | 40–5 | Malaysia |
| Try: Kim J.M. 1' c Kim H. 4' c Kim N. 7+' c Jang J. 10' m Chang (2) 14' c, 14+' c Con: Lee (3/3); Kim N. (2/3) | | Try: Mat Zizi 8' m Con: Mat Zizi (0/1) |

Gelora Bung Karno Rugby Field, Jakarta
Referee: Matthew Rodden (New Zealand)

Classification semifinal (5–8)

1 September
16:34

| Malaysia | 33–12 | Thailand |
| Try: Ismail 3' c Zulkifli 4' c Jalil 6' c Nasarrudin 7+' m Mat Zizi 8' c Con: Mat Zizi (4/5) | | Try: Puangpun 10' m Chakrabandhu 12' c Con: Khamkoet (1/2) |

Gelora Bung Karno Rugby Field, Jakarta
Referee: Noriaki Hashimoto (Japan)

Fifth place game

1 September
19:30

| China | 7–12 | Malaysia |
| Try: Ma 10' c Con: Ma (1/1) | | Try: Nasarrudin 3' m Ismail 5' c Con: Mat Zizi (1/2) |

Gelora Bung Karno Rugby Field, Jakarta
Referee: Suguru Kamamuta (Japan)

== Sambo ==
=== Men ===
| Athlete | Event | Round of 32 | Round of 16 | Quarterfinals | Semifinals | Repechage | Final / BM | |
| Athlete | Event | Opposition Result | Opposition Result | Opposition Result | Opposition Result | Opposition Result | Opposition Result | Rank |
|---|---|---|---|---|---|---|---|---|
| Yousuff Daniel Fauzi Cruz | Middleweight (90 kg) | Rio Akbar Bahari (INA); L 1–3 | Did not advance | | | | | |
| Mohamad Ezzat Mohamed Noor | Middleweight (90 kg) | Yossi Siswanto (INA); L 0–2 | Did not advance | | | | | |

== Sailing ==
| Athlete | Event | Final | |
| Athlete | Event | Score | Rank |
|---|---|---|---|
| Khairulnizam Afendy | Men's Laser | 32 | 2nd place, silver medalist(s) |
| Ahmad Syukri Abdul Aziz; Mohamad Faizal Norizan | Men's 470 | 59 | 5 |
| Nur Shazrin Mohd Latif | Laser Radial | 41 | 3rd place, bronze medalist(s) |
| Norashikin Mohamad Sayed; Nuraisyah Jamil | Women's 470 | 43 | 3rd place, bronze medalist(s) |
| Illham Wahab; Nuur Fatin Solehah | Mixed RS:One | 113 | 3rd place, bronze medalist(s) |
| Muhammad Fauzi Kaman Shah | Laser 4.7 | 25 | 1st place, gold medalist(s) |
| Nor Nabila Natasha Mohd Nazri | Laser 4.7 | 127 | 12 |

== Sepak takraw ==
Men

| Athlete | Event | Group stage | | | | | Semifinal | Final | |
| Athlete | Event | Opposition Score | Opposition Score | Opposition Score | Opposition Score | Rank | Opposition Score | Opposition Score | Rank |
|---|---|---|---|---|---|---|---|---|---|
| Azlan Alias; Zulkifli Abd Razak; Norhaffizi Abd Razak; Farhan Adam; Syahir Rosdi | Regu | Nepal (NEP); W 2–0 | India (IND); W 2–0 | South Korea (KOR); W 2–0 | China (CHN); W 2–0 | 1 Q | Singapore (SGP); W 2–0 | Indonesia (INA); W 2–1 | 1st place, gold medalist(s) |
| Said Ezwan Said De; Noraizat Mohd Nordin; Syazreenqamar Salehan; Azlan Alias; Afifuddin Razali; Kamal Ishak; Zulkifli Abd Razak; Norhaffizi Abd Razak; Farhan Adam; Hairul Hazizi Haidzir; Aidil Aiman Azwawi; Syahir Rosdi | Team regu | Thailand (THA); L 0–3 | South Korea (KOR); W 3–0 | —N/a | | 2 Q | Indonesia (INA); W 2–0 | Thailand (THA); L 0–2 | 2nd place, silver medalist(s) |

Women

| Athlete | Event | Group stage | | | | | Semifinal | Final | |
| Athlete | Event | Opposition Score | Opposition Score | Opposition Score | Opposition Score | Rank | Opposition Score | Opposition Score | Rank |
|---|---|---|---|---|---|---|---|---|---|
| Nurul Izzatul Hikmah; Rahilah Harun; Nor Farhana Ismail; Emilia Eva Natasha; Nurul Aqirah Mat Tahir; Siti Nor Suhaida Jafri | Quadrant | Thailand (THA); L 0–2 | India (IND); W 2–0 | Japan (JPN); W 2–0 | Vietnam (VIE); L 0–2 | 3 | Did not advance | | |
| Asumalin Rattana Som Chok; Nurul Izzatul Hikmah; Rahilah Harun; Nor Farhana Ismail; Nur Liyana Ismail; Nurrashidah Abdul Rashid; Emilia Eva Natasha; Nur Fatihah Azizul; Nurul Aqirah Mat Tahir; Siti Nor Suhaida Jafri; Razmah Anam; Kamisah Khamis | Team regu | Vietnam (VIE); L 0–3 | Myanmar (MYA); L 0–3 | Japan (JPN); W 3–0 | Indonesia (INA); L 0–3 | 4 | Did not advance | | |

== Shooting ==
=== Men ===
| Athlete | Event | Qualification | | | | Final | |
| Athlete | Event | 1 | | 2 | | Final | |
| Athlete | Event | Score | Rank | Score | Rank | Score | Rank |
|---|---|---|---|---|---|---|---|
| Mohamad Lutfi Othman | 10m Air Rifle | 614.3 | 28 | —N/a | | did not advance | |
| Mohamad Lutfi Othman | 50m Rifle 3 Positions | 1158 | 10 | —N/a | | did not advance | |
| Johnathan Guanjie Wong | 10m Air Pistol | 570 | 24 | —N/a | | did not advance | |
| Chen Seong Fook | Men's trap | 68 | 22 | 110 | 26 | did not advance | |

=== Women ===
| Athlete | Event | Qualification | | | | Final | |
| Athlete | Event | 1 | | 2 | | Final | |
| Athlete | Event | Score | Rank | Score | Rank | Score | Rank |
|---|---|---|---|---|---|---|---|
| Nur Izazi Rosli | 10m Air Rifle | 622.3 | 10 | —N/a | | did not advance | |
| Joseline Cheah Lee Yean | 10m Air Pistol | 559 | 24 | —N/a | | did not advance | |
| Bibiana Ng | 10m Air Pistol | 560 | 23 | —N/a | | did not advance | |
| Bibiana Ng | 25 m pistol | 282 | =20 | 569 | 25 | did not advance | |
| Alia Sazana Azahari | 25 m pistol | 284 | 15 | 579 | 9 | did not advance | |

=== Mixed ===
| Team | Event | Qualification | | Final | |
| Team | Event | Score | Rank | Score | Rank |
|---|---|---|---|---|---|
| Malaysia's Shooting Mixed | 10m Air Rifle | 820.5 | 10 | did not advance | |
| Malaysia's Shooting Mixed | 10m Pistol Rifle | 755 | 10 | did not advance | |

== Sport climbing ==
Speed

| Athlete | Event | Qualification | | Round of 16 | Quarterfinals | Semifinals | Final / BM | |
| Athlete | Event | Best | Rank | Opposition Time | Opposition Time | Opposition Time | Opposition Time | Rank |
|---|---|---|---|---|---|---|---|---|
| Ghalib Azimi | Men's | 8.942 | 22 | Did not advance | | | | |
| Taqiuddin Zulkifli | Men's | 7.744 | 17 | Did not advance | | | | |
| Aina Azrin Zulkifli | Women's | 11.988 | 18 | Did not advance | | | | |
| Amalina Syairah | Women's | 11.244 | 15 Q | P Lestari (INA); L 11.390–8.885 | Did not advance | | | 14 |

Speed relay

| Athlete | Event | Qualification | | Quarterfinals | Semifinals | Final / BM | |
| Athlete | Event | Time | Rank | Opposition Time | Opposition Time | Opposition Time | Rank |
|---|---|---|---|---|---|---|---|
| Ghalib Azimi; Izzat Shokor; Taqiuddin Zulkifli | Men's | 28.656 | 12 | Did not advance | | | |
| Siti Nursarah Salehhodin; Amalina Syairah; Tan Jie Yi; Aina Azrin Zulkifli | Women's | 40.228 | 9 | Did not advance | | | |

Combined

| Athlete | Event | Qualification | | | | | Final | | | | |
| Athlete | Event | Speed Point | Boulder Point | Lead Point | Total | Rank | Speed Point | Boulder Point | Lead Point | Total | Rank |
|---|---|---|---|---|---|---|---|---|---|---|---|
| Mohd Izzat Shokor | Men's | 14 | 18 | 17 | 4282 | 18 | Did not advance | | | | |
| Taqiuddin Zulkifl | Men's | 13 | 12 | 5 | 780 | 12 | Did not advance | | | | |
| Tan Jie Yi | Women's | 13 | 16 | 15 | 3120 | 16 | Did not advance | | | | |
| Siti Nursarah Salehhodin | Women's | 20 | 18 | 17 | 6120 | 18 | Did not advance | | | | |

== Squash ==
Individual

| Athlete | Event | Round of 32 | Round of 16 | Quarter-final | Semi-final | Final/ Bronze medal | Rank |
| Athlete | Event | Opposition score | Opposition score | Opposition score | Opposition score | Opposition score | Rank |
|---|---|---|---|---|---|---|---|
| Ivan Yuen (7) | Men's singles | Muhammad Nur Tastaftyan (INA); W 3–0 | Muhammad Asim Khan (PAK); W 3–0 | Leo Au (HKG); L 0–3 | did not advance | | |
| Mohd Nafiizwan Adnan (5) | Men's singles | Ravindu Laksiri (SRI); W 3–0 | Syed Azlan Amjad (QAT); W 3–0 | Abdulla Al-Tamimi (QAT); W 3–2 | Max Lee (HKG); L 2–3 | Did not advance | 3rd place, bronze medalist(s) |
| Nicol David (1) | Women's singles | Bye | Li Dongjin (CHN); W 3–0 | Satomi Watanabe (JPN); W 3–0 | Dipika Pallikal Karthik (IND); W 3–0 | Sivasangari Subramaniam (MAS); W 3–2 | 1st place, gold medalist(s) |
| Sivasangari Subramaniam (6) | Women's singles | Mihiliya Methsarani (SRI); W 3–0 | Yuliana Catur (INA); W 3–0 | Annie Au (HKG); W 3–2 | Joshna Chinappa (IND); W 3–1 | Nicol David (MAS); L 2–3 | 2nd place, silver medalist(s) |

=== Men's team ===
Pool B

| Pos | Team | Pld | W | L | MF | MA | Pts | Qualification |
|---|---|---|---|---|---|---|---|---|
| 1 | Malaysia | 5 | 5 | 0 | 13 | 2 | 10 | Semifinals |
| 2 | India | 5 | 4 | 1 | 12 | 3 | 8 | Semifinals |
| 3 | Singapore | 5 | 3 | 2 | 8 | 7 | 6 | |
| 4 | Qatar | 5 | 2 | 3 | 8 | 7 | 4 | |
| 5 | Indonesia | 5 | 1 | 4 | 4 | 11 | 2 | |
| 6 | Thailand | 5 | 0 | 5 | 0 | 15 | 0 | |

Source: Results

| 27 August | Malaysia | 3–0 | Singapore |

Ng Eain Yow | 3–0 | Timothy Leong | 11–5, 11–2, 11–2
Mohd Syafiq Kamal | 3–0 | Benedict Chan | 11–8, 11–7, 11–6
Ivan Yuen | 3–0 | Samuel Kang | 12–10, 11–2, 12–10

| 27 August | Malaysia | 3–0 | Thailand |

Ng Eain Yow | 3–0 | Phuwis Poonsiri | 11–2, 11–3, 11–4
Mohd Syafiq Kamal | 3–0 | Chattaporn Juntanayingyong | 11–2, 11–0, 11–4
Ivan Yuen | 3–0 | Natthakit Jivasuwan | 11–6, 11–1, 11–1

| 28 August | Malaysia | 3–0 | Indonesia |

Ivan Yuen | 3–0 | Satria Bagus Laksana | 11–7, 11–7, 11–5
Ng Eain Yow | 3–0 | Agung Wilant | 11–4, 11–3, 11–4
Mohd Syafiq Kamal | 3–0 | Andi Hasanudin | 11–6, 11–1, 11–5

| 29 August | Malaysia | 2–1 | Qatar |

Ivan Yuen | 3–0 | Hamad Al-Amri | 11–6, 11–6, 11–4
Ng Eain Yow | 3–0 | Syed Azlan Amjad | 11–4, 11–7, 11–6
Mohd Nafiizwan Adnan | 0–3 | Abdulla Al-Tamimi | 4–11, 8–11, 2–11

| 30 August | India | 1–2 | Malaysia |

Harinder Pal Sandhu | 2–3 | Ng Eain Yow | 11–7, 3–11, 11–8, 3–11, 3–11
Ramit Tandon | 1–3 | Ivan Yuen | 8–11, 11–9, 10–12, 7–11
Saurav Ghosal | 3–2 | Mohd Nafiizwan Adnan | 11–5, 9–11, 11–8, 12–14, 11–7

Semifinals

| 31 August | Malaysia | 2–0 | Pakistan |

Mohd Nafiizwan Adnan | 3–0 | Tayyab Aslam | 11–8, 11–6, 11–6
Ng Eain Yow | 3–1 | Israr Ahmed | 7–11, 11–8, 16–14, 11–6

Gold medal match

| 1 September | Hong Kong | 1–2 | Malaysia |

Yip Tsz Fung | 3–1 | Ivan Yuen | 11–7, 20–18, 9–11, 11–8
Max Lee | 0–3 | Mohd Nafiizwan Adnan | 9–11, 7–11, 7–11
Leo Au | 0–3 | Ng Eain Yow | 7–11, 7–11, 4–11

=== Women's team ===
Pool A

| Pos | Team | Pld | W | L | MF | MA | Pts | Qualification |
|---|---|---|---|---|---|---|---|---|
| 1 | Malaysia | 4 | 4 | 0 | 12 | 0 | 8 | Semifinals |
| 2 | Japan | 4 | 3 | 1 | 8 | 4 | 6 | Semifinals |
| 3 | South Korea | 4 | 2 | 2 | 6 | 6 | 4 | |
| 4 | Philippines | 4 | 1 | 3 | 3 | 9 | 2 | |
| 5 | Pakistan | 4 | 0 | 4 | 1 | 11 | 0 | |

Source: Results

| 27 August | Malaysia | 3–0 | Pakistan |

Nicol David | 3–0 | Madina Zafar | 11–4, 11–3, 11–6
Aifa Azman | 3–0 | Riffat Khan | 11–2, 11–2, 11–9
Low Wee Wern | 3–0 | Faiza Zafar | 11–3, 11–3, 11–4

| 27 August | Malaysia | 3–0 | Philippines |

Nicol David | 3–0 | Jemyca Aribado | 13–11, 11–7, 11–2
Sivasangari Subramaniam | 3–0 | Andrea Jemiolo | 11–8, 11–2, 11–1
Low Wee Wern | 3–0 | Aysah Dalida | 11–3, 11–2, 11–2

| 28 August | Malaysia | 3–0 | South Korea |

Sivasangari Subramaniam | 3–0 | Eum Hwa-yeong | 11–7, 11–6, 11–4
Low Wee Wern | 3–0 | Choi Yu-ra | 11–3, 11–6, 11–5
Aifa Azman | 3–0 | Lee Ji-hyun | 11–7, 11–9, 11–6

| 29 August | Malaysia | 3–0 | Japan |

Sivasangari Subramaniam | 3–0 | Risa Sugimoto | 11–3, 11–5, 11–9
Low Wee Wern | 3–0 | Misaki Kobayashi | 11–5, 11–1, 11–3
Nicol David | 3–0 | Satomi Watanabe | 11–6, 12–10, 11–4

Semifinals

| 31 August | Malaysia | 0–2 | India |

Nicol David | 2–3 | Joshna Chinappa | 10–12, 9–11, 11–6, 12–10, 9–11
Low Wee Wern | 0–3 | Dipika Pallikal | 2–11, 9–11, 7–11

== Swimming ==
=== Men ===
| Athlete | Event | Heat | | Final | |
| Athlete | Event | Time | Rank | Time | Rank |
|---|---|---|---|---|---|
| Foong Wei Tze | 50m freestyle | 24.17 | 32 | did not advance | |
| Foong Wei Tze | 50m breaststroke | 29.51 | 21 | did not advance | |
| Keith Lim Kit Sern | 50m freestyle | 23.37 | 21 | did not advance | |
| Keith Lim Kit Sern | 100m freestyle | 50.73 | 20 | did not advance | |
| Keith Lim Kit Sern | 200m freestyle | 1:54:22 | 21 | did not advance | |
| Welson Sim Wee Sheng | 100m freestyle | 50.34 | 14 | did not advance | |
| Welson Sim Wee Sheng | 200m freestyle | 1:48:47 | 5 Q | 1:47:99 | 6 |
| Welson Sim Wee Sheng | 400m freestyle | 3:54:48 | 9 | did not advance | |
| Welson Sim Wee Sheng | 800m freestyle | N/A | | 8:12:46 | 11 |
| Tern Jian Han | 50m backstroke | 26:88 | 20 | did not advance | |
| Tern Jian Han | 100m backstroke | 57.71 | 14 | did not advance | |
| Chan Jie | 50m butterfly | 24.96 | 21 | did not advance | |
| Chan Jie | 100m butterfly | 54.20 | 13 | did not advance | |
| N/A | 4 x 100 m Freestyle Relay | 3:22:89 | 6 Q | 3:21:06 | 6 |

=== Women ===
| Athlete | Event | Heat | | Final | |
| Athlete | Event | Time | Rank | Time | Rank |
|---|---|---|---|---|---|
| Phee Jinq En | 50m breaststroke | 31.46 | 5 Q | 31.64 | 5 |
| Phee Jinq En | 100m breaststroke | 1:08:83 | 7 Q | 1:09:01 | 8 |

== Table tennis ==
=== Men ===
| Athlete | Event | Round of 64 | Round of 32 | Round of 16 | Quarterfinals | Semi-finals | Finals | Rank |
| Athlete | Event | Opoosition score | Opoosition score | Opoosition score | Opoosition score | Opoosition score | Opoosition score | Rank |
|---|---|---|---|---|---|---|---|---|
| Muhamad Ashraf Haiqal Muhamad Rizal | Men's singles | Ahmed Moosa Munsif (MDV); W 4–0 | Nima Alamian Darounkolaei (IRI); L 1–4 | Did not advance | | | | |
| Leong Chee Feng | Men's singles | Alisher Iakupbaev (KGZ); W 4–0 | Lin Gaoyuan (CHN); L 0–4 | Did not advance | | | | |

=== Women ===
| Athlete | Event | Round of 64 | Round of 32 | Round of 16 | Quarterfinals | Semi-finals | Finals | Rank |
| Athlete | Event | Opoosition score | Opoosition score | Opoosition score | Opoosition score | Opoosition score | Opoosition score | Rank |
|---|---|---|---|---|---|---|---|---|
| Ho Ying | Women's singles | Jeon Jihee (KOR); L 0–4 | Did not advance | | | | | |
| Alice Chang Li Sian | Women's singles | Yu Mengyu (SGP); L 1–4 | Did not advance | | | | | |

=== Mixed ===
| Athlete | Event | Round of 64 | Round of 32 | Round of 16 | Quarterfinals | Semi-finals | Finals | Rank |
| Athlete | Event | Opoosition score | Opoosition score | Opoosition score | Opoosition score | Opoosition score | Opoosition score | Rank |
|---|---|---|---|---|---|---|---|---|
| Ho Ying Leong Chee Feng | Mixed doubles | Bye | Masataka Morizono; Misaki Morizono (JPN); L 1–3 | Did not advance | | | | |
| Javen Choong Karen Lyne Dick | Mixed doubles | Bye | Manika Batra; Sharath Kamal (IND); L 0–3 | Did not advance | | | | |

=== Team ===
| Team | Event | Preliminary Round | | | | Rank | Quarterfinals | Semi-finals | Finals | Rank |
| Team | Event | Opoosition score | Opoosition score | Opoosition score | Opoosition score | Rank | Opoosition score | Opoosition score | Opoosition score | Rank |
|---|---|---|---|---|---|---|---|---|---|---|
| Malaysia's Men | Men's team | Laos (LAO); W 3–0 | China (CHN); L 0–3 | Nepal (NEP); W 3–0 | North Korea (PRK); L 0–3 | 3 | Did not advance | | | |
| Malaysia's Women | Women's team | Nepal (NEP); W 3–0 | Hong Kong (HKG); L 0–3 | Vietnam (VIE); W 3–2 | Singapore (SGP); L 0–3 | 3 | Did not advance | | | |

== Taekwondo ==
Poomsae

| Athlete | Event | Round of 16 | Quarterfinal | Semi-final | Final | |
| Athlete | Event | Opposition Score | Opposition Score | Opposition Score | Opposition Score | Rank |
|---|---|---|---|---|---|---|
| Chew Wei Yan | Men's individual | Choy Cheuk Yin (HKG); W 8.02–7.55 | Kang Min-sung (KOR); L 8.20–8.35 | did not advance | | |
| Yap Khim Wen | Women's individual | Huda Akbar (QAT); W 7.87–6.95 | Ji Yuhan (CHN); W 8.20–8.18 | Marjan Salahshouri (IRI); L 8.30–8.43 | Did not advance | 3rd place, bronze medalist(s) |

Kyorugi

| Athlete | Event | Round of 32 | Round of 16 | Quarterfinal | Semi-final | Final | |
| Athlete | Event | Opposition Score | Opposition Score | Opposition Score | Opposition Score | Opposition Score | Rank |
|---|---|---|---|---|---|---|---|
| Ahmad Nor Iman Hakim | Men's −63 kg | Phounathone Souksavath (LAO); W 32–12 | Molom Tumenbayar (MGL) L 5–26 | did not advance | | | |
| Rozaimi Rozali | Men's −68 kg | Bye | Hamal Gyanendra (NEP) W 2–30 | Kaiyrbek Yerassyl (KAZ) L 12–1 | did not advance | | |
| Nur Putra Danial Azlan | Men's −80 kg | Pürevjavyn Temüüjin (MGL); L 13–35 | did not advance | | | | |
| Tan Yen Ming | Men's +80 kg | —N/a | Hamza Kattan (JOR); L 17–7 | did not advance | | | |
| Nurul Farah Alisa | Women's −57 kg | Bye | Kashish Malik (IND); L 28–10 | did not advance | | | |

== Triathlon ==
Individual

| Athlete | Event | Swim (1.5 km) | Trans 1 | Bike (39.6 km) | Trans 2 | Run (10 km) | Total Time | Rank |
|---|---|---|---|---|---|---|---|---|
| Aldrian Yeo Yu Yong | Men's | 21:35 | 0:28 | 1:01:54 | 0:25 | 41:09 | 2:05:31 | 23 |
| Ryan Tan Qai Shen | Men's | 21:35 | 0:30 | 1:01:52 | 0:24 | 39:59 | 2:04:20 | 21 |
| Irene Chong See Win | Women's | 21:49 | 0:30 | 1:07:23 | 0:30 | 50:47 | 2:20:59 | 12 |
| Teoh Sue Ling | Women's | 25:04 | 0:41 | 1:09:58 | 0:43 | 53:01 | 2:29:27 | 16 |

Mixed relay

| Athletes | Event | Total Times per Athlete (Swim 300 m, Bike 6.3 km, Run 2.1 km) | Total Group Time | Rank |
|---|---|---|---|---|
| Aldrian Yeo Yu Yong; Irene Chong See Win; Ryan Tan Qai Shen; Teoh Sue Ling | Mixed relay | 24:40; 26:54; 25:26; 29:59 | 1:46:59 | 10 |

== Wushu ==
Taolu

| Athlete | Event | Event 1 | | Event 2 | | Total | Rank |
| Athlete | Event | Result | Rank | Result | Rank | Total | Rank |
|---|---|---|---|---|---|---|---|
| Yeap Wai Kin | Men's changquan | 9.63 | 8 | —N/a | | 9.63 | 8 |
| Wong Wen Son | Men's changquan | 9.59 | 9 | —N/a | | 9.59 | 9 |
| Calvin Wai Leong Lee | Men's nanquan and nangun | 9.59 | 8 | 9.70 | 5 | 19.29 | 6 |
| Loh Jack Chang | Men's taijiquan and taijijian | 9.58 | 13 | 9.68 | 8 | 19.26 | 10 |
| Tan Cheong Min | Women's nanquan and nandao | 9.71 | 2 | 9.44 | 9 | 19.15 | 4 |
| Audrey Chan Yee Jo | Women's taijiquan and taijijian | 9.56 | 9 | 9.65 | 6 | 19.21 | 7 |
| Phoon Eyin | Women's jianshu and qiangshu | 9.58 | 6 | 9.68 | 4 | 19.26 | 4 |

== See also ==
- Malaysia at the 2018 Asian Para Games
