= Bowling at the 2018 Asian Games – Men's masters =

Men's masters at the 2018 Asian Games
- Venue: Jakabaring Bowling Center
- Date: 26–27 August 2018
- Competitors: 16 from 9 nations

Medalists
gold medal	Muhammad Rafiq Ismail	Malaysia
silver medal	Park Jong-woo	South Korea
bronze medal	Koo Seong-hoi	South Korea

The men's masters competition at the 2018 Asian Games in Palembang was held on 26 and 27 August 2018 at Jakabaring Bowling Center.

The Masters event comprises the top 16 bowlers (maximum two per country) from the all-events category. Block 1 were played on long oil pattern lane, while Block 2 were played on medium oil pattern lane.

== Schedule ==
All times are Western Indonesia Time (UTC+07:00)

Date	Time	Event
Sunday, 26 August 2018	09:00	1st block
Monday, 27 August 2018	13:00	2nd block
Monday, 27 August 2018	15:30	Stepladder final round 1
Monday, 27 August 2018	15:30	Stepladder final round 2

== Results ==
=== Preliminary ===
Rank	Athlete	Game																Total
Rank	Athlete	1	2	3	4	5	6	7	8	9	10	11	12	13	14	15	16	Total
1	Muhammad Rafiq Ismail (MAS)	255; 10	169; 0	223; 10	244; 10	229; 10	251; 10	227; 0	231; 10	278; 10	278; 10	265; 10	246; 0	222; 10	233; 10	272; 10	252; 10	4005
2	Koo Seong-hoi (KOR)	232; 0	276; 10	244; 10	223; 0	219; 0	187; 0	268; 10	245; 10	220; 10	278; 10	221; 0	256; 10	289; 10	289; 10	236; 0	207; 0	3980
3	Park Jong-woo (KOR)	247; 10	212; 10	267; 10	246; 10	251; 0	226; 0	277; 10	245; 10	224; 10	241; 10	207; 10	183; 0	254; 0	243; 10	210; 0	267; 10	3910
4	Lin Pai-feng (TPE)	221; 0	267; 0	243; 10	244; 10	235; 10	233; 10	234; 0	211; 0	223; 0	255; 0	264; 10	210; 10	220; 0	265; 10	254; 10	233; 10	3902
5	Takuya Miyazawa (JPN)	208; 10	255; 10	222; 0	243; 0	230; 0	236; 10	246; 10	202; 0	255; 10	211; 0	289; 10	197; 0	289; 10	243; 0	289; 10	187; 0	3882
6	Jaris Goh (SGP)	243; 10	257; 10	202; 0	192; 0	232; 10	230; 10	232; 10	252; 10	243; 10	225; 0	242; 0	245; 0	265; 10	244; 10	221; 0	256; 0	3871
7	Hung Kun-yi (TPE)	223; 10	265; 0	277; 10	221; 10	220; 0	222; 10	233; 10	215; 10	223; 0	245; 10	233; 0	224; 0	221; 10	234; 0	266; 0	211; 0	3813
8	Syafiq Ridhwan (MAS)	188; 0	222; 0	235; 0	276; 10	212; 0	203; 10	212; 0	208; 0	199; 0	257; 0	287; 10	245; 10	262; 10	211; 10	257; 10	252; 10	3806
9	Enrico Hernandez (PHI)	229; 0	230; 10	241; 10	213; 0	183; 0	236; 0	245; 10	200; 0	278; 10	256; 10	257; 10	247; 10	201; 0	232; 0	186; 0	254; 0	3758
10	Annop Arromsaranon (THA)	242; 10	211; 0	184; 0	221; 0	244; 10	170; 0	208; 0	208; 0	232; 0	263; 10	245; 10	267; 10	212; 0	253; 10	221; 10	267; 10	3728
11	Shusako Asato (JPN)	232; 0	243; 10	220; 0	224; 0	222; 0	208; 0	245; 10	245; 0	232; 0	234; 0	232; 0	224; 10	212; 0	157; 0	267; 10	197; 0	3634
12	Ryan Leonard Lalisang (INA)	181; 0	252; 10	244; 0	199; 10	221; 10	188; 0	219; 0	223; 10	257; 10	246; 0	211; 0	243; 10	184; 0	224; 10	223; 0	235; 10	3630
13	Darren Ong (SGP)	219; 0	173; 0	219; 0	236; 0	251; 10	253; 10	193; 0	220; 10	208; 0	247; 10	195; 0	267; 10	242; 10	183; 0	234; 10	201; 10	3621
14	Ivan Tse (HKG)	203; 0	177; 0	239; 10	223; 0	265; 10	212; 10	255; 10	188; 0	234; 10	188; 0	222; 0	258; 0	220; 0	278; 0	183; 0	211; 0	3606
15	Hardy Rachmadian (INA)	189; 10	196; 0	244; 0	229; 10	255; 10	188; 0	265; 10	213; 0	207; 0	220; 0	247; 10	211; 0	199; 0	200; 0	204; 0	251; 10	3578
16	Kenneth Chua (PHI)	232; 10	267; 10	222; 10	253; 10	144; 0	201; 0	211; 0	205; 0	210; 0	242; 10	186; 0	233; 0	234; 10	208; 0	253; 10	179; 0	3550

=== Stepladder finals ===
Stepladder final round 1			Stepladder final round 2
			1	Muhammad Rafiq Ismail (MAS)	245	289	534
2	Koo Seong-hoi (KOR)	245	3	Park Jong-woo (KOR)	266	245	511
3	Park Jong-woo (KOR)	254
