= Sailing at the 2018 Asian Games – Laser 4.7 =

Open Laser 4.7 at the 2018 Asian Games
- Venue: Ancol Beach Marina
- Date: 24–31 August 2018
- Competitors: 23 from 14 nations

Medalists
gold medal	Fauzi Kaman Shah	Malaysia
silver medal	Wang Jianxiong	China
bronze medal	Harshita Tomar	India

The open Laser 4.7 competition at the 2018 Asian Games was held from 24 to 31 August 2018. It was a youth event and sailors born on or after 1 January 2001 and on or before 31 December 2002 were eligible to compete in the event.

== Schedule ==
All times are Western Indonesia Time (UTC+07:00)

Date	Time	Event
Friday, 24 August 2018	14:15	Race 1
Friday, 24 August 2018	15:00	Race 2
Saturday, 25 August 2018	12:15	Race 3
Saturday, 25 August 2018	12:55	Race 4
Saturday, 25 August 2018	13:40	Race 5
Sunday, 26 August 2018	12:28	Race 6
Sunday, 26 August 2018	13:42	Race 7
Tuesday, 28 August 2018	12:10	Race 8
Tuesday, 28 August 2018	12:55	Race 9
Wednesday, 29 August 2018	12:55	Race 10
Wednesday, 29 August 2018	14:08	Race 11
Friday, 31 August 2018	14:10	Race 12

== Results ==
Legend

- DSQ — Disqualification
- RET — Retired
- UFD — U flag disqualification

Rank	Athlete	Race												Total
Rank	Athlete	1	2	3	4	5	6	7	8	9	10	11	12	Total
1st place, gold medalist(s)	Fauzi Kaman Shah (MAS)	1	3	~~(5)~~	5	1	1	2	1	1	1	3	1	20
2nd place, silver medalist(s)	Wang Jianxiong (CHN)	3	1	1	6	2	~~(24)~~; UFD	1	8	5	5	7	3	42
3rd place, bronze medalist(s)	Harshita Tomar (IND)	6	2	~~(12)~~	11	4	9	6	7	2	2	1	12	62
4	Govind Bairagi (IND)	9	9	4	1	5	6	3	2	13	11	~~(14)~~	4	67
5	Kaiyo Maeda (JPN)	~~(24)~~; DSQ	8	3	2	10	3	4	12	9	8	12	8	79
6	Chen Jiaming (CHN)	8	10	2	9	7	~~(11)~~	11	5	7	7	8	5	79
7	Kim Da-jeong (KOR)	5	~~(11)~~	7	8	8	7	5	10	10	9	6	10	85
8	Saranwong Poonpat (THA)	2	6	6	7	6	4	8	16	~~(24)~~; UFD	17	15	2	89
9	Abdulmalik Al-Hinai (OMA)	7	17	8	3	3	2	7	~~(24)~~; UFD	12	12	9	9	89
10	Gregory Roger Wardojo (INA)	11	5	9	4	12	13	10	6	3	13	~~(16)~~	6	92
11	Daniel Hung (SGP)	4	4	13	12	9	10	14	9	~~(24)~~; UFD	6	2	11	94
12	Nor Nabila Natasha (MAS)	~~(16)~~	12	14	14	14	12	9	11	4	3	4	14	111
13	Lisa Nukui (JPN)	15	13	15	13	13	16	15	3	8	4	~~(17)~~	17	132
14	Abdulrahman Al-Nasr (QAT)	13	15	11	10	11	5	12	15	14	19	~~(20)~~	7	132
15	Kim Dong-wook (KOR)	10	7	10	15	~~(20)~~	8	13	14	16	16	11	13	133
16	Chanokchon Wangsuk (THA)	12	14	17	17	16	15	18	4	11	10	10	~~(20)~~	144
17	Jodie Lai (SGP)	14	16	18	~~(20)~~	15	14	16	17	6	15	5	19	155
18	Nima Rahbari (IRI)	~~(21)~~	20	19	16	17	18	17	18	19	18	19	16	197
19	Andini Setyaningrum (INA)	17	19	~~(20)~~	19	19	17	20	19	15	20	18	18	201
20	Saif Al-Mansoori (UAE)	20	18	21	21	~~(22)~~	22	21	13	17	14	13	22	202
21	Muhammad Awais (PAK)	18	~~(22)~~	16	18	18	19	19	20	18	21	22	15	204
22	Salama Al-Mansoori (UAE)	19	21	~~(23)~~	23	21	20	23	22	20	22	21	21	233
23	Nhov Chan (CAM)	22	23	22	22	~~(24)~~; RET	21	22	21	21	23	23	23	243
