= Sepak takraw at the 2018 Asian Games – Men's regu =

Men's regu at the 2018 Asian Games
- Venue: Ranau Sports Hall
- Date: 25–28 August 2018
- Competitors: 45 from 9 nations

Medalists
gold medal	Malaysia
silver medal	Indonesia
bronze medal	South Korea
bronze medal	Singapore

The men's regu sepak takraw competition at the 2018 Asian Games was held at Ranau Sports Hall, Palembang, Indonesia from 25 to 28 August 2018.

== Squads ==
China	India	Indonesia	Malaysia
Fan Xu; Zhang Ruhao; Wang Wei; Kang Xinyu; Yang Jiapeng	Niken Singh Khangembam; Sandeep Kumar; Harish Kumar; Henary Singh Wahengbam; Akash Yumnam	Mohamad Herson Saipul; Muhammad Hardiansyah Muliang; Nofrizal; Abdul Halim Radjiu; Victoria Eka Prasetyo	Azlan Alias; Zulkifli Abd Razak; Norhaffizi Abd Razak; Farhan Adam; Syahir Rosdi
Nepal	Pakistan	Philippines	Singapore
Dipesh Jung Thapa; Sanjeet Dhimal; Rupesh Sunar; Govinda Magar; Rabin Bhattarai	Shabbir Ahmed; Shiraz Asif; Hussain Ahmed; Shahid Hameed; Sarfaraz Rehman	Joeart Jumawan; Rheyjey Ortouste; Alvin Pangan; Ronsited Gabayeron; Emmanuel Escote	Afif Safiee; Farhan Aman; Mohd Asri Aron; Asfandi Ja'al; Farhan Amran
South Korea			
Lim Tae-gyun; Lee Jun-ho; Kim Young-man; Shim Jae-chul; Jeong Won-deok			

== Results ==
All times are Western Indonesia Time (UTC+07:00)

=== Preliminary ===
==== Group A ====
Pos	Team	Pld	W	L	SF	SA	SD	Pts	Qualification
1	Indonesia	3	3	0	6	0	+6	6	Semifinals
2	Singapore	3	2	1	4	3	+1	4	Semifinals
3	Philippines	3	1	2	3	4	−1	2	
4	Pakistan	3	0	3	0	6	−6	0	

Source: OCA

Date	Time		Score		Set 1	Set 2	Set 3
25 Aug	15:00	Indonesia	2–0	Philippines	21–10	21–11	
25 Aug	18:15	Singapore	2–0	Pakistan	21–2	21–6	
26 Aug	11:00	Indonesia	2–0	Pakistan	21–1	21–5	
26 Aug	11:00	Singapore	2–1	Philippines	9–21	21–18	21–11
27 Aug	10:00	Philippines	2–0	Pakistan	21–10	21–6	
27 Aug	10:00	Indonesia	2–0	Singapore	21–5	21–16	

==== Group B ====
Pos	Team	Pld	W	L	SF	SA	SD	Pts	Qualification
1	Malaysia	4	4	0	8	0	+8	8	Semifinals
2	South Korea	4	3	1	6	2	+4	6	Semifinals
3	India	4	2	2	4	5	−1	4	
4	China	4	1	3	3	6	−3	2	
5	Nepal	4	0	4	0	8	−8	0	

Source: OCA

Date	Time		Score		Set 1	Set 2	Set 3
25 Aug	14:00	Nepal	0–2	Malaysia	1–21	2–21	
25 Aug	14:00	South Korea	2–0	India	21–6	21–6	
25 Aug	17:00	South Korea	2–0	Nepal	21–4	21–2	
26 Aug	10:00	South Korea	2–0	China	21–13	21–4	
26 Aug	10:00	India	0–2	Malaysia	13–21	20–22	
26 Aug	13:00	China	2–0	Nepal	21–4	21–9	
26 Aug	13:00	South Korea	0–2	Malaysia	21–23	15–21	
26 Aug	16:00	China	1–2	India	21–19	17–21	9–21
27 Aug	11:00	China	0–2	Malaysia	15–21	12–21	
27 Aug	11:00	India	2–0	Nepal	21–5	21–15	

=== Knockout round ===
Semifinals
27 August
Indonesia	2
South Korea	0
27 August
Malaysia	2
Singapore	0

Gold medal match
28 August
Indonesia	1
Malaysia	2

==== Semifinals ====
Date	Time		Score		Set 1	Set 2	Set 3
27 Aug	15:00	Indonesia	2–0	South Korea	21–19	21–16	
27 Aug	15:00	Malaysia	2–0	Singapore	21–8	21–8	

==== Gold medal match ====
Date	Time		Score		Set 1	Set 2	Set 3
28 Aug	10:00	Indonesia	1–2	Malaysia	21–18	20–22	11–21
