= Squash at the 2018 Asian Games – Women's singles =

Women's singles at the 2018 Asian Games
- Venue: Gelora Bung Karno Squash Stadium
- Dates: 23–26 August 2018
- Competitors: 28 from 14 nations

Medalists
gold medal	Nicol David	Malaysia
silver medal	Sivasangari Subramaniam	Malaysia
bronze medal	Dipika Pallikal	India
bronze medal	Joshna Chinappa	India

The women's singles squash event was part of the squash programme and took place between 23 August and 26 August, at the Gelora Bung Karno Hall D.

== Schedule ==
All times are Western Indonesia Time (UTC+07:00)

Date	Time	Event
Thursday, 23 August 2018	12:15	Round of 32
Thursday, 23 August 2018	19:00	Round of 16
Friday, 24 August 2018	15:00	Quarterfinals
Saturday, 25 August 2018	15:00	Semifinals
Sunday, 26 August 2018	16:00	Gold medal match

== Results ==
=== Finals ===
Semifinals						Gold medal match
1	Nicol David (MAS)	11	11	11
4	Dipika Pallikal (IND)	7	9	6		1	Nicol David (MAS)	11	11	5	11	11
3	Joshna Chinappa (IND)	10	6	11	7	6	Sivasangari Subramaniam (MAS)	13	9	11	6	8
6	Sivasangari Subramaniam (MAS)	12	11	9	11

=== Top half ===
==== Section 1 ====
Round of 32
Zoltögsiin Enkh-Uchral (MGL)	2	4	3
9	Li Dongjin (CHN)	11	11	11
14	Yeung Weng Chi (MAC)	5	5	9
Fereshteh Eghtedari (IRI)	11	11	11
Fathoum Issadeen (SRI)	7	9	6
8	Satomi Watanabe (JPN)	11	11	11

Round of 16
1	Nicol David (MAS)	11	11	11
9	Li Dongjin (CHN)	8	5	1
Fereshteh Eghtedari (IRI)	7	5	2
8	Satomi Watanabe (JPN)	11	11	11

Quarterfinals
1	Nicol David (MAS)	11	11	11
8	Satomi Watanabe (JPN)	6	4	3

==== Section 2 ====
Round of 32
7	Misaki Kobayashi (JPN)	11	11	11
Gu Jinyue (CHN)	2	4	2
Choi Yu-ra (KOR)	11	11	11
12	Liu Kwai Chi (MAC)	4	1	7
15	Anantana Prasertratanakul (THA)	11	5	8	8
Yeni Siti Rohmah (INA)	9	11	11	11

Round of 16
7	Misaki Kobayashi (JPN)	11	11	6	11	11
Choi Yu-ra (KOR)	5	8	11	13	9
Yeni Siti Rohmah (INA)	6	5	5
4	Dipika Pallikal (IND)	11	11	11

Quarterfinals
7	Misaki Kobayashi (JPN)	4	7	8
4	Dipika Pallikal (IND)	11	11	11

=== Bottom half ===
==== Section 3 ====
Round of 32
Hadis Farzad (IRI)	6	9	11	5
10	Jemyca Aribado (PHI)	11	11	7	11
13	Madina Zafar (PAK)	6	9	4
Ahn Eun-tschan (KOR)	11	11	11
Tuddaw Thamronglarp (THA)	1	2	2
5	Joey Chan (HKG)	11	11	11

Round of 16
3	Joshna Chinappa (IND)	11	11	12
10	Jemyca Aribado (PHI)	2	8	10
Ahn Eun-tschan (KOR)	9	5	4
5	Joey Chan (HKG)	11	11	11

Quarterfinals
3	Joshna Chinappa (IND)	11	12	5	12
5	Joey Chan (HKG)	5	10	11	10

==== Section 4 ====
Round of 32
6	Sivasangari Subramaniam (MAS)	11	11	11
Mihiliya Methsarani (SRI)	6	6	6
Catur Yuliana (INA)	7	11	11	6	14
11	Faiza Zafar (PAK)	11	6	8	11	12
16	Aysah Dalida (PHI)	11	11	11
Amarmendiin Uyanga (MGL)	0	0	2

Round of 16
6	Sivasangari Subramaniam (MAS)	11	11	11
Catur Yuliana (INA)	6	7	6
16	Aysah Dalida (PHI)	1	4	4
2	Annie Au (HKG)	11	11	11

Quarterfinals
6	Sivasangari Subramaniam (MAS)	11	11	11	3	11
2	Annie Au (HKG)	9	13	5	11	5
