= Muhammad Rafiq Ismail =

Malaysian ten-pin bowling player

Rafiq Ismail
Personal information
- Full name: Muhammad Rafiq bin Ismail
- Nationality: Malaysian
- Born: 24 March 1997 (age 29) Selangor, Malaysia
- Height: 1.77 m (5 ft 10 in)
- Weight: 85 kg (187 lb)

Sport
- Country: Malaysia
- Sport: Bowling
- Events: Singles, Trios, Masters, Doubles
Medal record
Representing Malaysia
Men's Bowling
| Event | 1st | 2nd | 3rd |
|---|---|---|---|
| World Bowling Championships | 1 | – | – |
| Asian Games | 1 | 2 | – |
| Asian Championships | 1 | – | – |
| Southeast Asian Games | 6 | 1 | 1 |
| Total | 9 | 3 | 1 |
WTBA World Tenpin Bowling Championships
| Gold medal – first place | 2018 Hong Kong | Singles |
Asian Bowling Championships
| Gold medal – first place | 2016 Hong Kong | Masters |
Asian Games
| Silver medal – second place | 2014 Incheon | Team |
| Gold medal – first place | 2018 Palembang | Masters |
| Silver medal – second place | 2018 Palembang | Trios |
Southeast Asian Games
| Gold medal – first place | 2015 Singapore | Singles |
| Gold medal – first place | 2015 Singapore | Trios |
| Gold medal – first place | 2015 Singapore | Team |
| Silver medal – second place | 2015 Singapore | Masters |
| Gold medal – first place | 2017 Malaysia | Singles |
| Gold medal – first place | 2017 Malaysia | Masters |
| Bronze medal – third place | 2019 Philippines | Doubles |
| Gold medal – first place | 2019 Philippines | Team |

Muhammad Rafiq Ismail (born 24 March 1997, Selangor, Malaysia) is a Malaysian ten-pin bowler.

== Career ==
Ismail bowls left handed with a 16lb ball. In 2018, he became the first Malaysian to win the singles final of the Men's World Tenpin Bowling Championships.

== Honours ==
- European Bowling Tour: 2019 EBT Masters
- WTBA World Tenpin Bowling Championships Men Singles: 2018
- National Sportsman Award: 2018
