= Taman Mini Indonesia Indah =

Cultural theme park in Jakarta, Indonesia

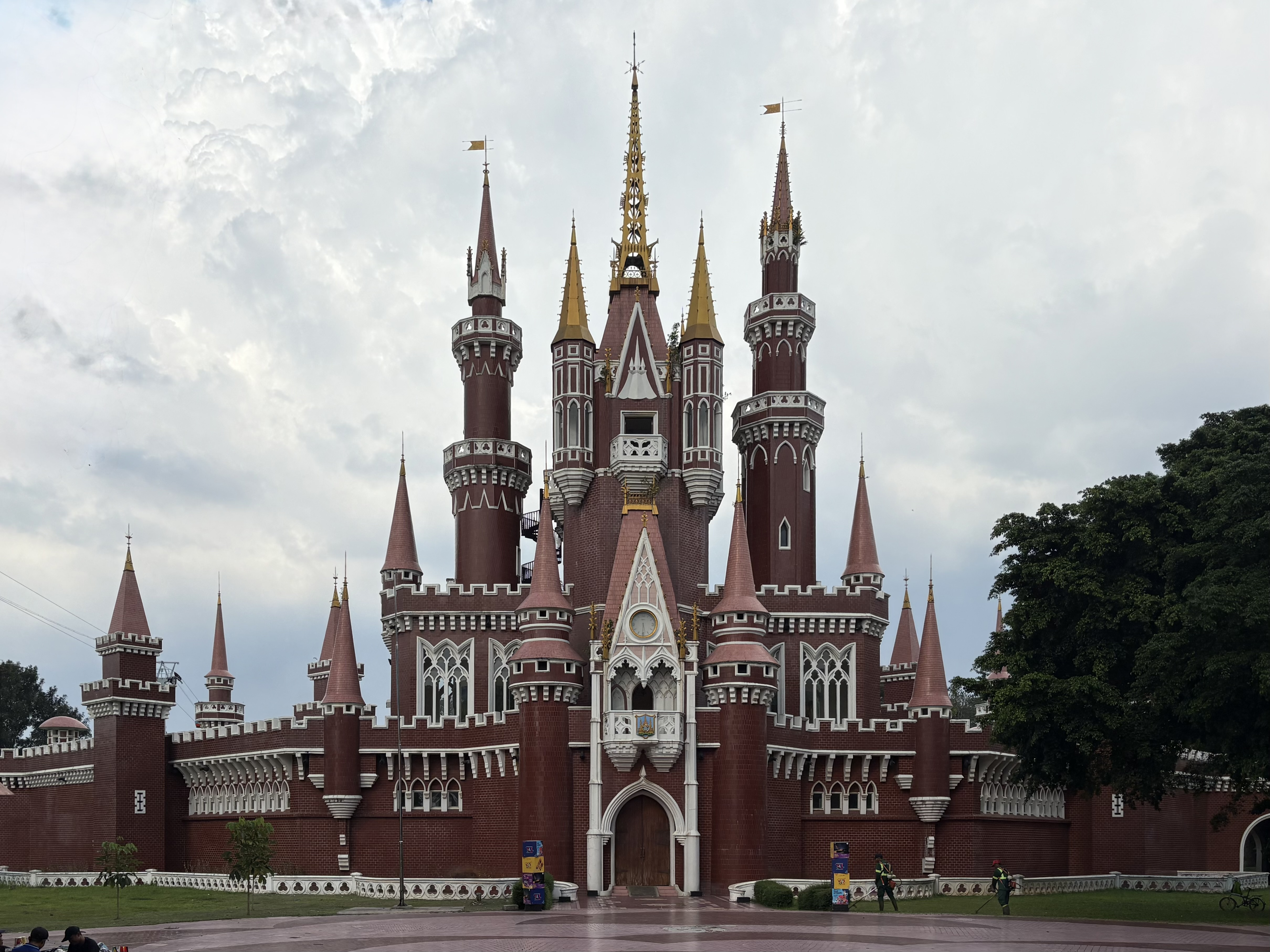
- Indonesian Children Castle at TMII
- Interactive map of Taman Mini Indonesia Indah
- Location: East Jakarta, Jakarta, Indonesia
- Coordinates: 6°18′6″S 106°53′48″E
- Status: Operating
- Public transit: TMII
- Opened: 20 April 1975; 51 years ago
- Owner: Government of Indonesia
- Operated by: Injourney Destination Management
- Slogan: Jelajah Cerita Indonesia (Explore the Story of Indonesia)
- Area: 146.8 ha (363 acres)
- Website: www.tamanmini.com

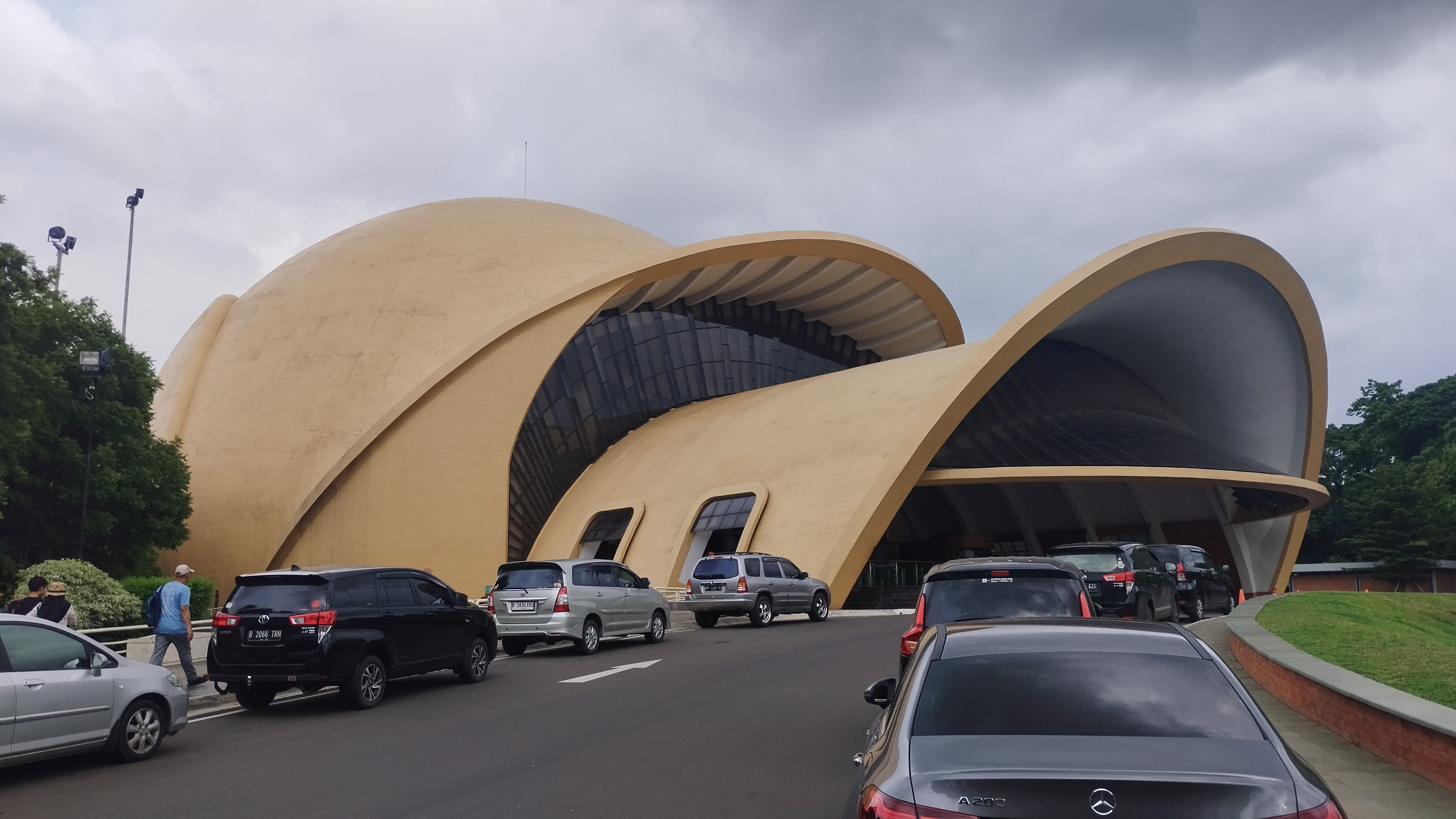
The iconic golden snail IMAX special-built cinema at Taman Mini Indonesia Indah. It was the only IMAX cinema in Indonesia until the opening of an IMAX screen in Gandaria City in the 2010s.

Taman Mini Indonesia Indah (lit. 'Beautiful Indonesia Mini Park'; formerly Taman Mini "Indonesia Indah" with apostrophes—abbreviated as TMII) is a culture-based recreational area located in East Jakarta, Indonesia. Since July 2021, it is operated by Injourney Destination Management (PT Taman Wisata Candi Borobudur, Prambanan, dan Ratu Boko), a subsidiary of the state-owned tourism holding company InJourney. It was operated by Yayasan Harapan Kita, a foundation established by Siti Hartinah, the first lady during most of the New Order and wife of Suharto, and run by Suharto's descendants since his death until 2021. It has an area of about 147 hectares (363 acres). The project cost some US$26 million.

The park is a synopsis of Indonesian culture, with virtually all aspects of daily life in Indonesia's 26 (in 1975) provinces encapsulated in separate pavilions with the collections of rumah adat as the example of Indonesian vernacular architecture, clothing, dances and traditions are all depicted impeccably. The park mainly exhibites the physical culture of the nation. Apart from that, there is a lake with a miniature of the archipelago and dancing fountain in the middle of it, cable cars, museums, Keong Emas IMAX cinema (Indonesia's only IMAX cinema until the 2010s), a theater called the Theatre of My Homeland (Teater Tanah Airku) and other recreational facilities which make TMII one of the most popular tourist destinations in the city.

On 31 December 2014, the World Peace Committee recognized TMII as an International Civilization Park and World Peace Theme Park.

== History ==
Nitra, the mascot of TMII

The idea of presenting Indonesia on a small scale was conceived by first lady, Siti Hartinah, better known as Tien Suharto. It came about at a convention on 8 Cendana Street on 13 March 1970. Through this recreational site, she hoped to cultivate national pride in more Indonesian people. A project called "Indonesian Miniature Project" was started by Harapan Kita Foundation in 1972. The concept of this culture-based recreational area was inspired by Indonesia's unparalleled natural riches and local folk diversity. Taman Mini Indonesia Indah was eventually inaugurated on 20 April 1975.

In 2011, the operator planned to disburse $35 million for building a new Discovery World theme park. A 2-hectare area was to be built and it was predicted to be operated before the end of 2012. It would serve 100 venues/rides and was predicted to attract 1.2 million visitors from Indonesia and Southeast Asia. However, the project was ultimately cancelled.

In January 2022, the revitalization of TMII was started to support the side event of the 2022 G20 Bali summit in Jakarta, with its new concept named "Indonesia Opera", designed by Urban+. The revitalization focuses on area readjusments and facility improvements. When the revitalization was executed, TMII was still opened to the public, until it was eventually closed on 17 May 2022. Because the new concept has an environmental friendly design, more green spaces were added, so TMII would consist of 70% green spaces and 30% buildings – based on its original masterplan in 1972. Apart from that, visitors are no longer allowed to explore the complex using personal cars or motorcycles, because the park is designated as a low-emission zone. As the alternative, visitors can explore the complex using the available zero-emission vehicles, such as electric microbuses and aeromovels, or renting a bicycle or electric scooters.

TMII was reopened to the public on 31 December 2022 after being chosen as one of the venues for the new year celebration 2023. On 1 September 2023, the revitalization of TMII was inaugurated by President Joko Widodo. The revitalization cost IDR 1.7 trillion, with additional budget from InJourney up to IDR 200 billion.

== Characteristics ==
TMII is built on an area of 147 ha, which was originally a stretch of farms and fields. The construction team was able to convert these fields into a suitable location for the construction. The topography of TMII is rather hilly, consistent with what the builders required. The team claimed the advantage of utilizing this uneven terrain was the ability to create interesting and diverse landscapes and enclosures, as well as reflecting the various characteristics of the Indonesian environment.

TMII has four entrance gates: public access are in gate 1 (west) for motorized vehicles and bicycles, and gate 3 (south) for pedestrian and motorized vehicles. Gate 2 (north) and 4 (east) are only for employees. The park currently has 33 pavilions of the provinces of Indonesia, 7 places of worship, 24 parks/open spaces, 17 museums, and 18 amusement rides and other facilities.

== Parts of TMII ==
=== Pavilions of Indonesian provinces ===
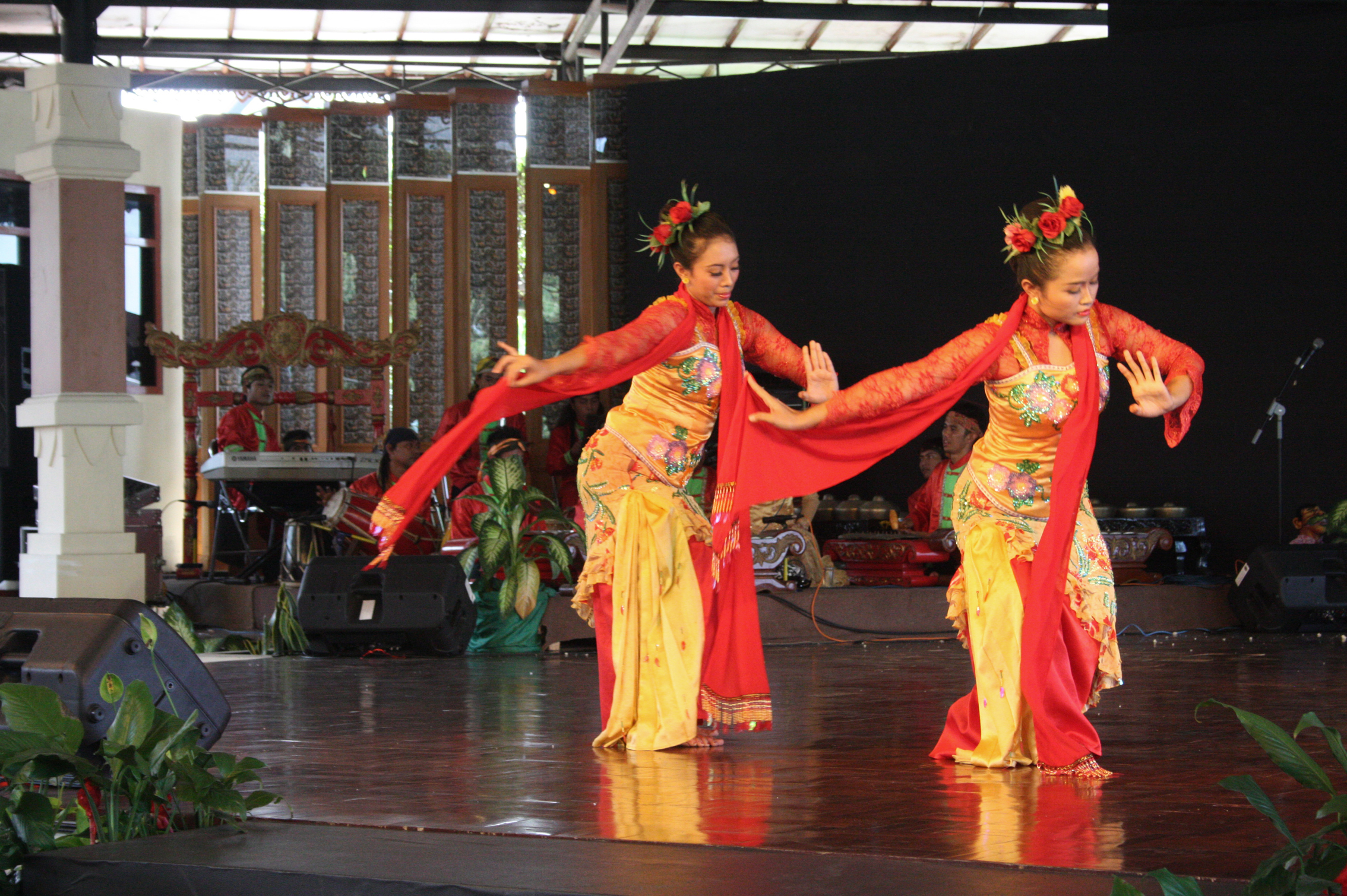
The Jaipongan dance performance in West Java pavilion in TMII.

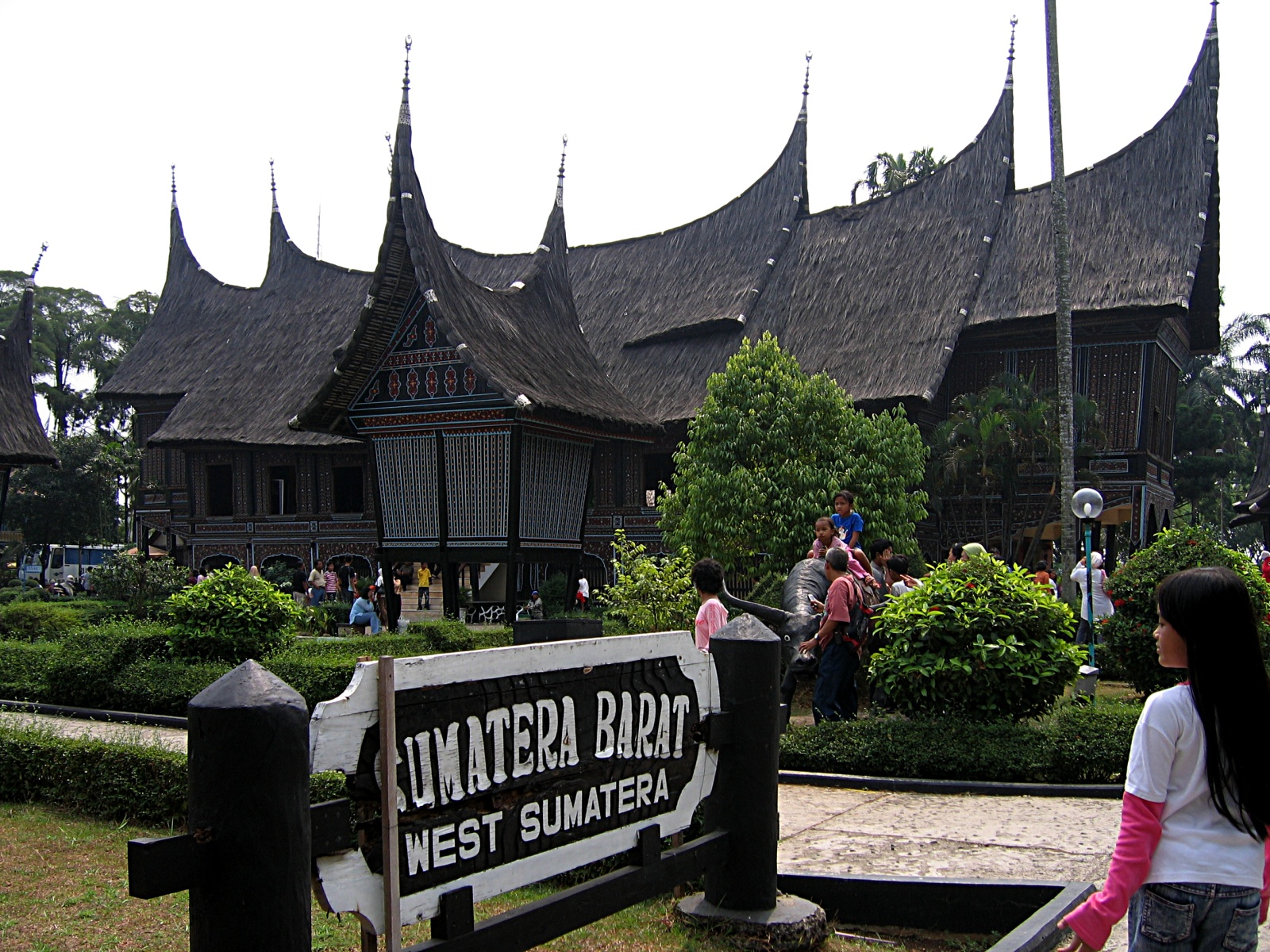
West Sumatra pavilion in TMII.

Provinces which had a pavilion in TMII: Original pavilions (1975) New pavilions, built after the period of formations of new provinces Provinces that do not have a pavilon yet

Since each Indonesian province maintains its own unique and distinct cultures, shelters, attire and dialects, TMII built a model of each of the houses from the provinces. TMII attempted not only to reconstruct the homes, but also to create a realistic model of the environment and shelters of the various people of Indonesia. The venues, which are situated around the main lake in a similar fashion to the different islands of the Indonesian archipelago, are thematically divided into six areas in respect to the main islands of Indonesia; Java, Sumatra, Kalimantan (Borneo), Sulawesi, the Lesser Sunda Islands Each pavilions featured in typical vernacular Indonesian architecture of each provinces. Examples of Indonesian traditional vernacular houses are: Joglo and Omah Kudus Javanese houses of Central Java, East Java, and Yogyakarta pavilion; Minang Rumah Gadang of West Sumatra pavilion; Malay houses of Jambi and Riau provinces; Torajan Tongkonan and Bugis house of South Sulawesi pavilion; and Balinese house compound with intricately carved candi bentar split gate and kori agung gate.

It also displays various traditional costumes, wedding costumes, dance costumes, ethnographic artifacts such as weapons and daily tools, and models of traditional architecture to describe the way of life of its people. Each province's pavilion is also equipped with a small stage, amphitheatre or auditorium for traditional dance performances, traditional music performances or traditional ceremonies that are usually held in Sundays. Some of these pavilions are also equipped with cafeterias featuring traditional Indonesian cuisines and also souvenir shops offering various handicrafts, T-shirts and souvenirs.

Since 1975 until the 2000s, the original design of TMII consisted of a model of the traditional houses (rumah adat) from the provinces of Indonesia, Since Indonesia consists of provinces (in 2004), the new province pavilions of Bangka Belitung, Banten, West Sulawesi, Gorontalo and Riau Islands have been built in northeast part of the park, although the size and area of these pavilions is much smaller than the previous ones.

After the recognition of the Chinese Indonesian culture as an integral part of Indonesian culture in 2000, the Chinese Indonesian pavilion and a confucian temple was built within the park.

=== Religious buildings ===
The religious buildings of several official faiths is meant to showcase the inter-faiths tolerance and religious harmony of Indonesia. The religious buildings are:

- Pangeran Diponegoro Mosque
- Santa Catharina Catholic church
- Haleluya Protestant church
- Penataran Agung Kertabhumi Balinese Hindu temple
- Arya Dwipa Arama Buddhist temple
- Kong Miao Confucian temple
- Sasana Adirasa Pangeran Samber Nyawa – It is used for religious activities of all religions and also as a place for inter-faith exchange of ideas.

=== Gardens and parks ===
There are about ten gardens spread within TMII complex, but most are located primarily on the north and northeast side of the main lake:

- Orchid Garden
- Medicinal herbs Garden
- Cactus Garden
- Jasmine Garden
- Keong Emas (Golden Snail) Flower Garden
- Picnic Park
- Taman Budaya Tionghoa Indonesia, a Chinese Indonesian cultural park

=== Taman Burung (Bird Park) ===
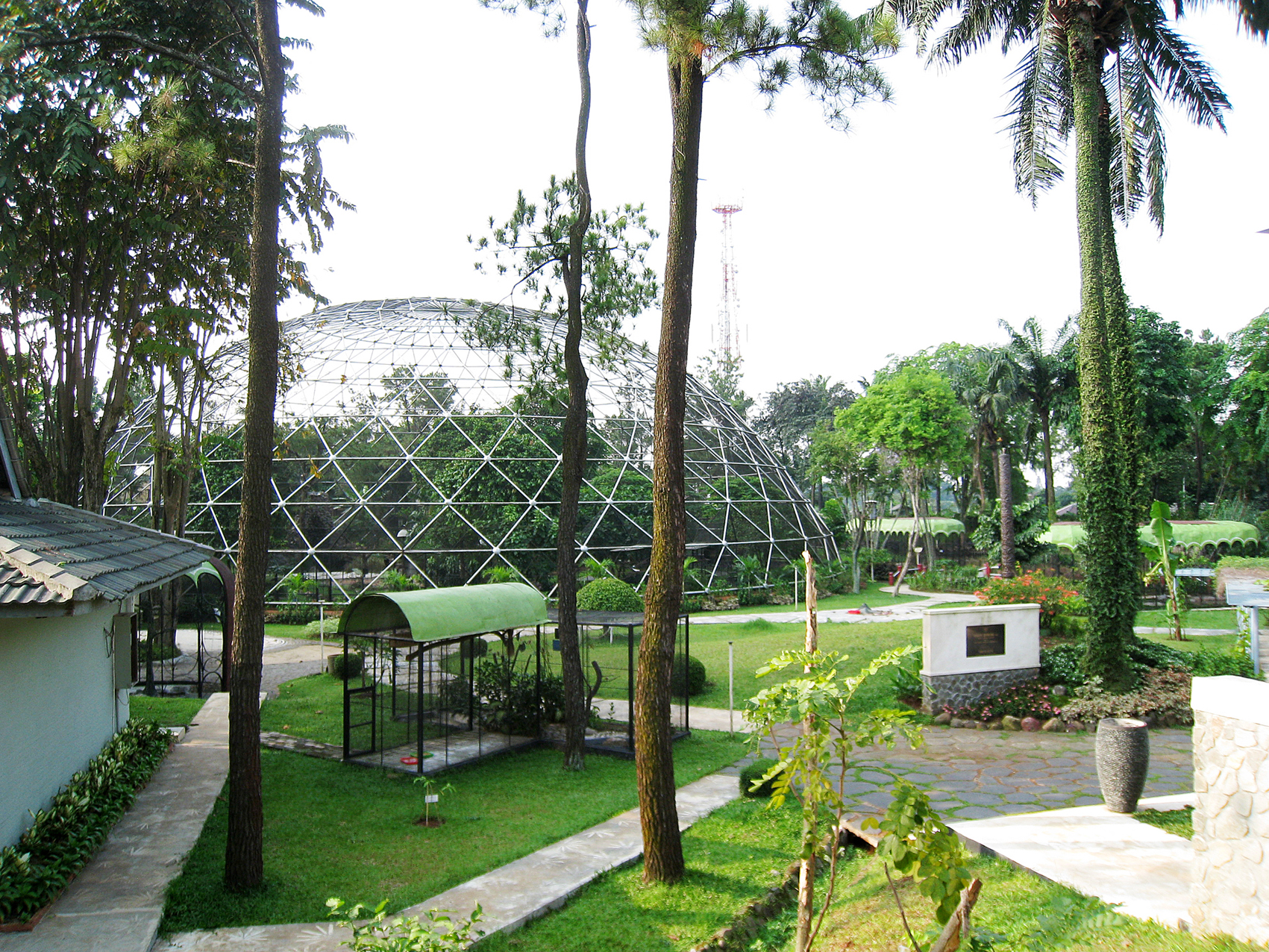
Spherical cage bird park.

Taman Burung is divided into five exhibits: Kubah barat (West dome) which include birds from the Greater Sunda Islands (Except Sulawesi) and the Lesser Sunda Islands, kubah timur (East dome) which include birds from Sulawesi, the Maluku Islands, and New Guinea, a free ranging river exhibit, raptor aviaries, and other aviaries and exhibits scattered around the park. The park also owns several birds from outside Indonesia, such as birds from China, Africa, Australia, and South America.

=== Dunia Air Tawar ===
Dunia Air Tawar is the second largest freshwater and brackish themed aquarium in Asia. The aquarium has over 6000 animals from 126 species, including reptiles, amphibian, crustaceans, and fish.

In April 1994, Dunia Air Tawar, known as Taman Aquarium Air Tawar at that time, acquired a pair of wild caught largetooth sawfish from Lake Sentani, which died in 2005, making it the only public aquarium to keep sawfish in Indonesia.

A large featherback kept by Dunia Air Tawar was said to be the extinct Chitala lopis. The individual is a wild caught from West Java.

=== Indonesia Science Center ===
The Indonesia Science Center (Indonesian: Pusat Peragaan Ilmu Pengetahuan dan Teknologi (PP-IPTEK), lit. 'Science and Technology Display Center') is a science center located east of the proper, operated by the National Research and Innovation Agency (BRIN). It was inaugurated on 20 April 1991. By late 2011, it has 15 sites with about 300 science tools and visited by 341,000 visitors yearly. The sites are Robotic, Electric and Magnet, Mechanics, Mathematics, etc.

=== Museums ===
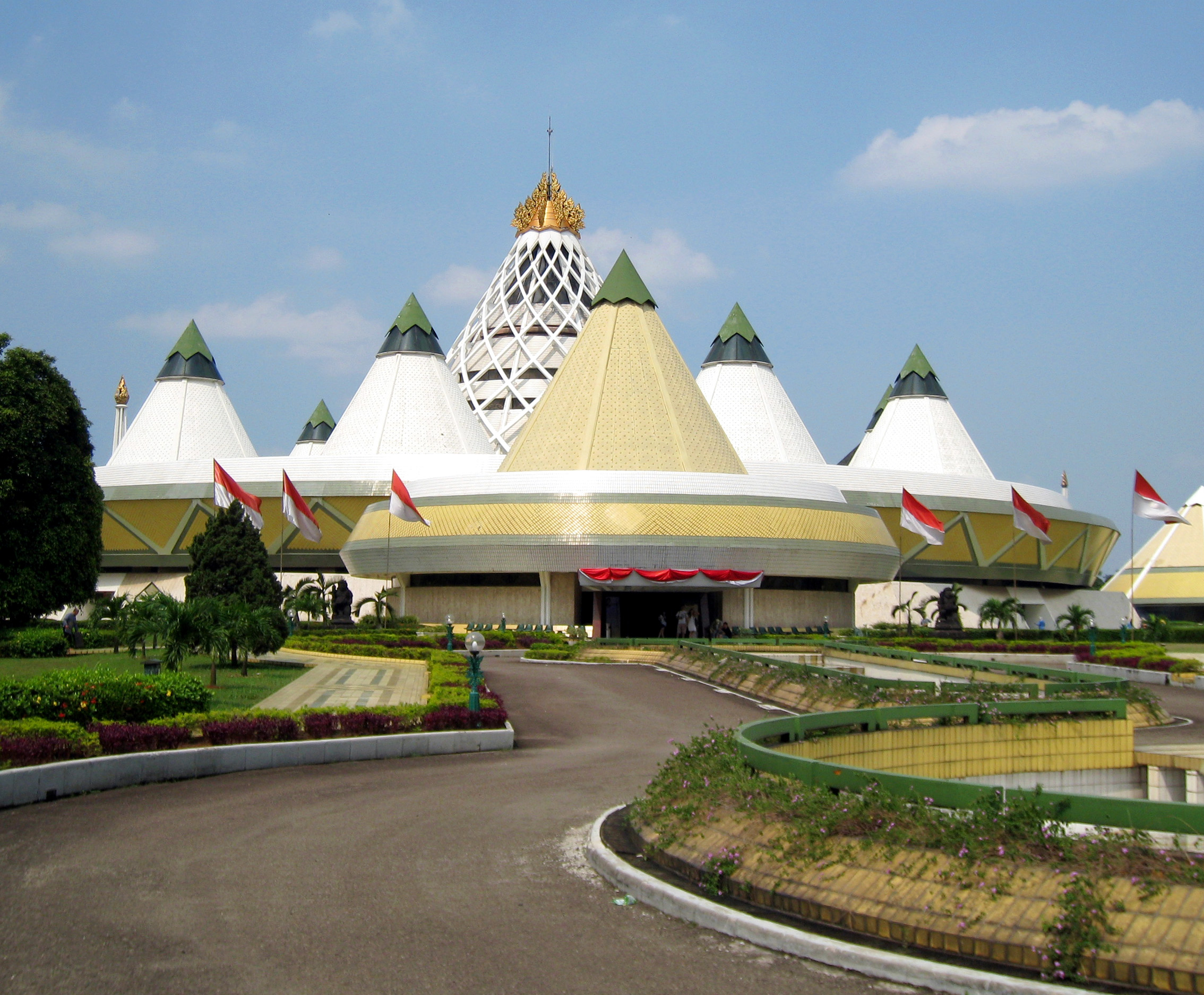
The Tumpeng style Purna Bhakti Pertiwi Museum displaying artworks and souvenirs collections of Suharto.

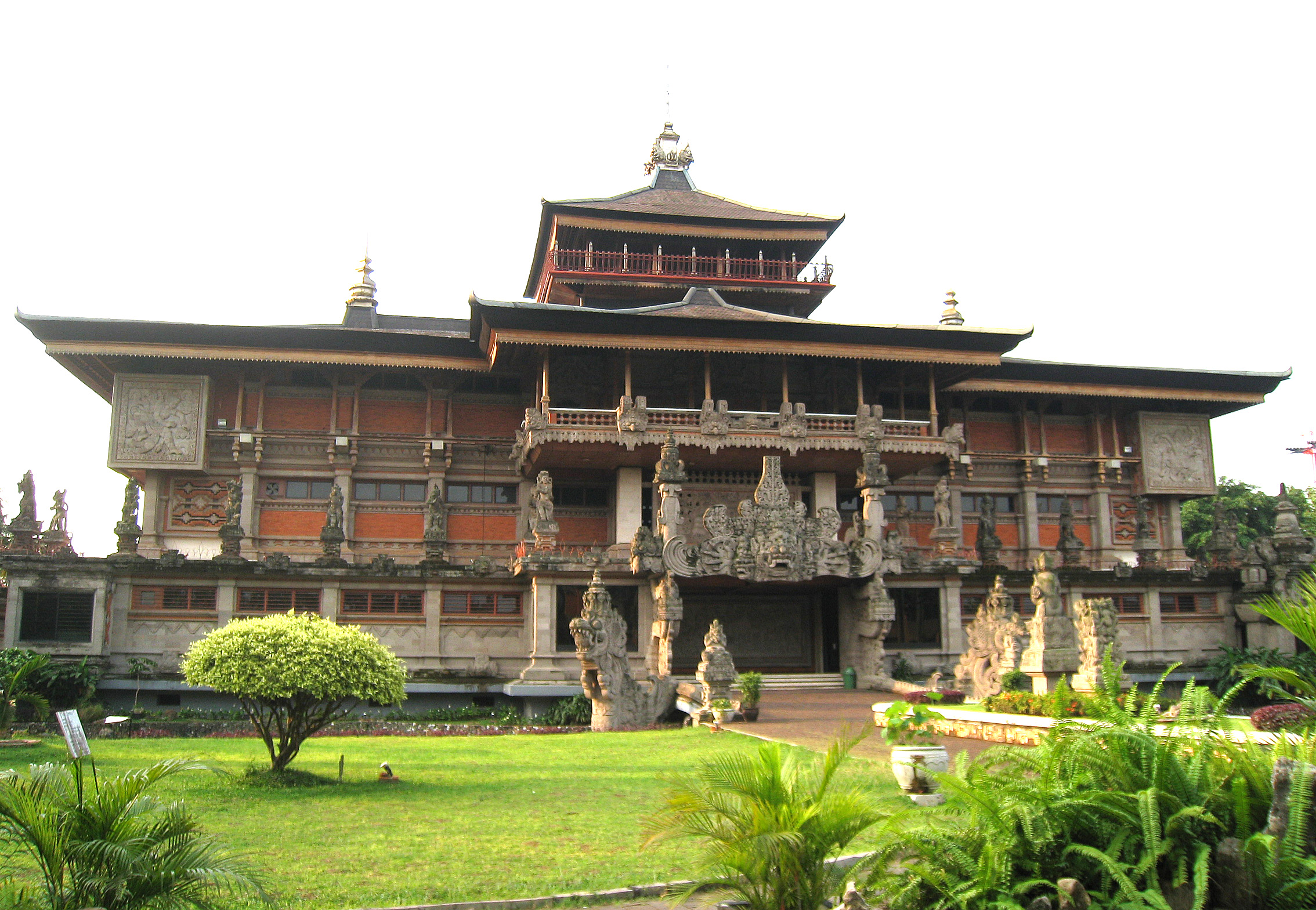
The Indonesia Museum with Balinese style architecture.

There are museums at TMII, some of them are managed under the corresponding Ministry or other government agencies; i.e. the Information Museum (Museum Penerangan) is managed by the Ministry of Communication and Digital Affairs, the successor of the Department of Information (Departemen Penerangan). The museums are as follows:

- Indonesia Museum
- Purna Bhakti Pertiwi Museum
- Soldiers Museum
- Stamps Museum
- Heritage Museum
- Transportation Museum
- Museum Electricity & New Energy Museum
- Information Museum
- Komodo Indonesian Fauna Museum and Reptile Parks and mammal park.
- Batik Museum
- Research & Technology Information Centre
- Oil & Gas Museum
- Bayt Al-Quran and Istiqlal Islamic Museum
- Indonesian Hakka Museum

=== Theatres ===
- Keong Emas (Golden Snail) IMAX Theater
- Tanah Airku Theater

=== Monuments, halls, buildings and other exhibits ===
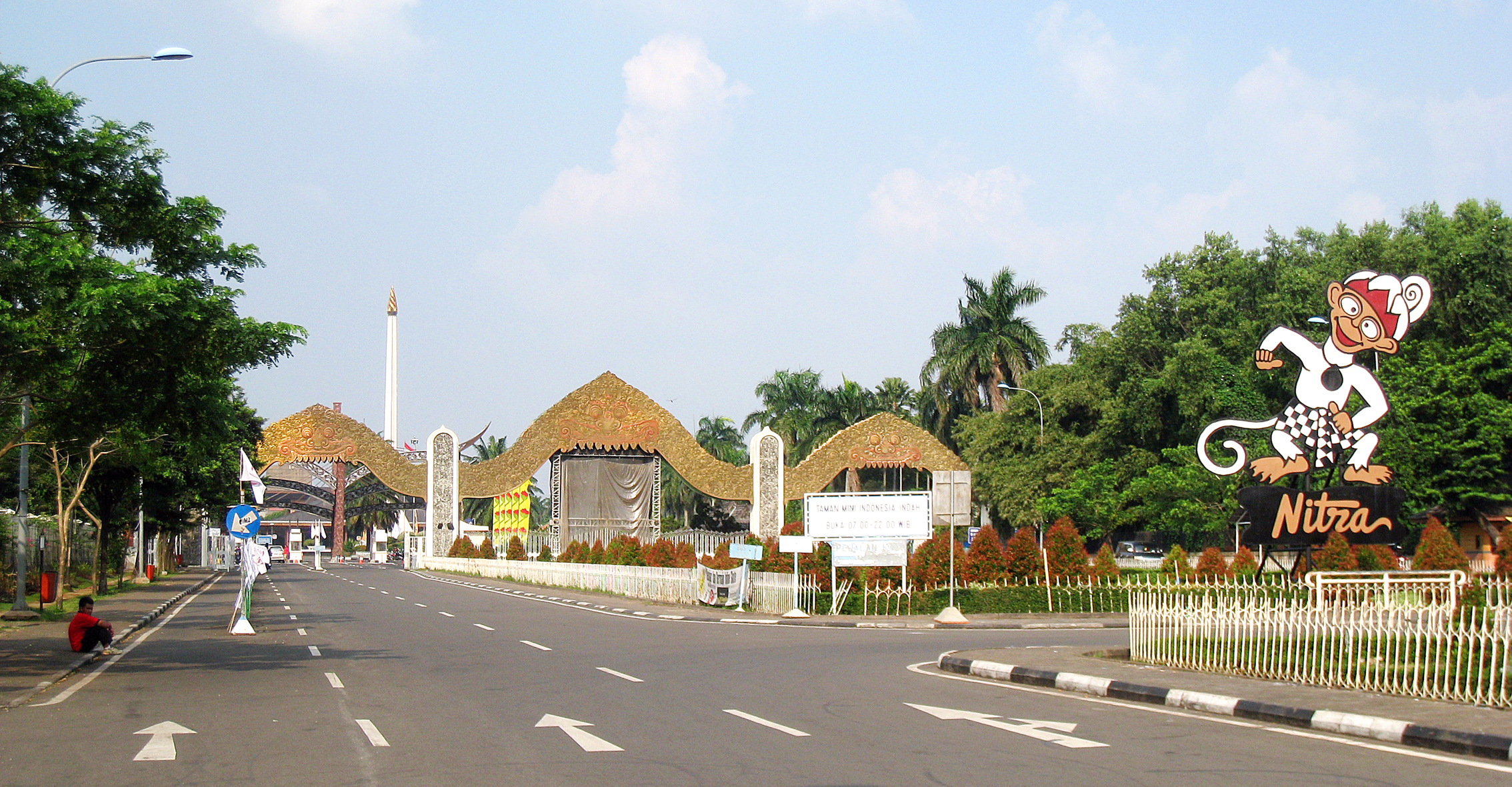
Kala Makara main entrance gate 1

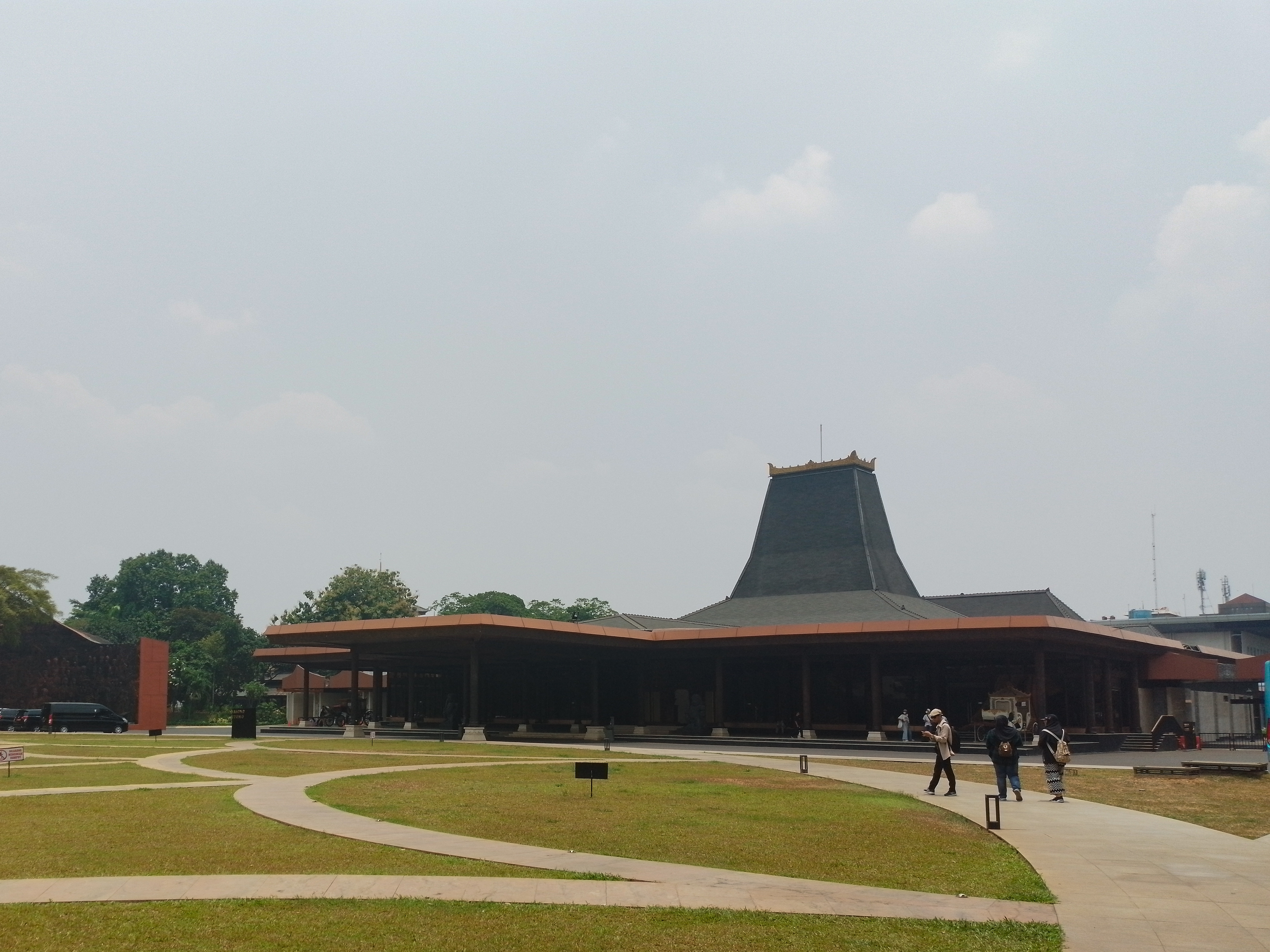
Sasono Utomo main building

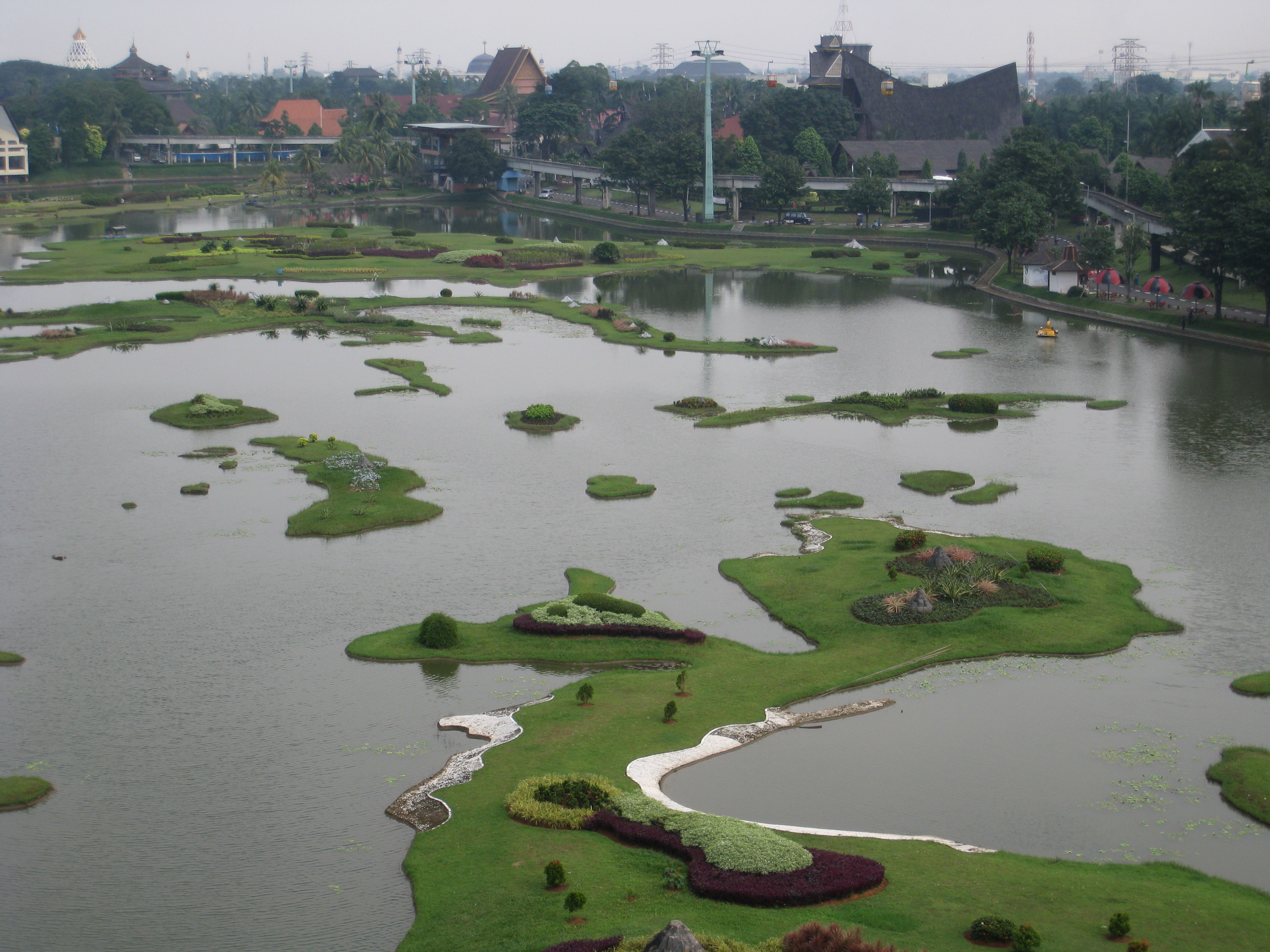
The miniature of Indonesian Archipelago in the center lake viewed from the cable car.

- Kala Makara gates (gapura) at entrance gate 1
- Gajah Mada Plaza – With the statue of Gajah Mada, it is built on the former site of the now-demolished Telecommunications Museum
- Tugu Api Pancasila, the main monument, an obelisk celebrating Pancasila
- Baluwerti, a twin gate with relief of Indonesian history on its wall
- Sasono Utomo, an exhibition hall
  - Pendopo Agung Sasono Utomo (Grand Hall), the main building of the hall in Javanese Joglo style
- Sasono Langen Budoyo, indoor stage and theater
- Sasono Manganti
- Sasana Kriya, a multi-purpose function hall
- Contemporary Art Gallery (CAG) – It displays modern contemporary art to complement the existence of traditional arts. A merchandise store is also located inside the building. It was previously used as the original management office of the park.
- Park management office
- Tourist Information Center (TIC)
- Cokot Sculpture, a display of wooden sculptures by Cokot, a famous Balinese artist
- The Miniature of Borobudur
- APEC Memorial Monument and Garden
- Non-Aligned Nations Friendship Monument and Garden – It is located east of the Indonesia Science Center, which also acts as the main entrance plaza of the science center.
- The miniature of the Indonesian archipelago on the central lake – Each island miniature are ilumminated by multicolor LED ambient light on its edge. The lake has dancing fountains and water screen that projects 9 selected Indonesian folklore at night. This dancing fountain attraction is called Tirta Cerita ('tirta' means water in Sanskrit, so it literally translated as "water of stories") and it also features an attraction of 300 drones that displays various forms, including a garuda, the Keong Emas theatre—the landmark of TMII, and the logo of TMII. Visitors can watch the Tirta Cerita attraction from an amphitheatre at the front of the Special Region of Yogyakarta pavilion. The attraction is held every night (except the drone display, which only performed on weekends), starting at 18:30.
- Jawadwipa amphitheatre – Located at the southwest of the archipelago lake, adjacent with the West Java pavilion.
- Plaza Malaka
- Cultural Stage – Located at the east side of the Archipelago Lake, used for cultural performances with the background of the lake.
- Community Center
- Jati Taminah, a remnant of a large teak tree
- Kayu Gede (lit. 'large wood'), the display of large tree trunk

=== Rides and transports ===
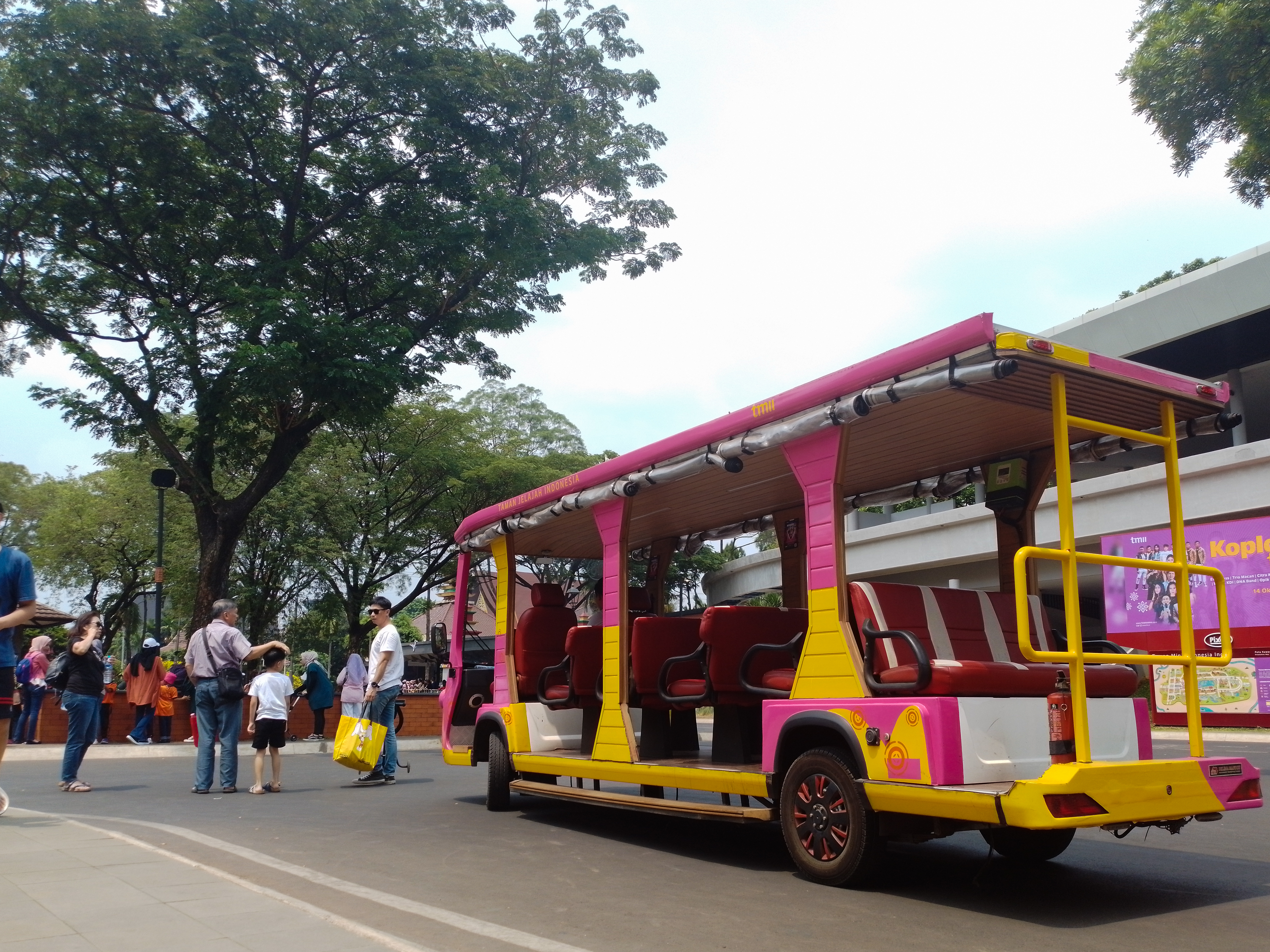
Electric microbus for visitor shuttle transport is provided throughout TMII

Since the 2022 revitalization, visitors are no longer allowed to explore TMII using personal motorcycles or cars. All personal vehicles have to be parked at the available parking lots at the west side of the park. Visitors are diverted to use an electric-powered shuttle microbus service called angkutan keliling or angling for free. The shuttle service has two corridors and visitors have to wait the shuttle microbus on bus shelters throughout the park. Apart from that, visitors can also use the Skylift Indonesia cable car or renting bicycles, golf carts, and electric scooters.

- Skylift Indonesia cable car, with three stations:
  - Station A, located near Keong Mas IMAX Theatre, Sasana Kriya, and Kong Miao Confucian Temple
  - Station B, located near Istana Anak-Anak Indonesia, and Science Center
  - Station C, located near the parking building, Indonesia Museum, and Panggung Candi Bentar
- Electric-powered shuttle microbuses, with two corridors:
  - North corridor, which stops at: Gerbang TIC - Anjungan Aceh - Anjungan Terpadu - Taman Burung - Community Center - Museum Penerangan - Anjungan Jambi
  - South corridor, which stops at: Gerbang TIC - Anjungan Jawa Timur - Anjungan Sulawesi Tenggara - Taman Burung - PP IPTEK - Museum Migas - Museum Transportasi - Fresh Water Aquarium - Taman Legenda Keong Mas
- Garuda Kencana people mover (suspended)
- Bicycle, golf carts, and electric scooter rent ride

=== Recreation facilities ===
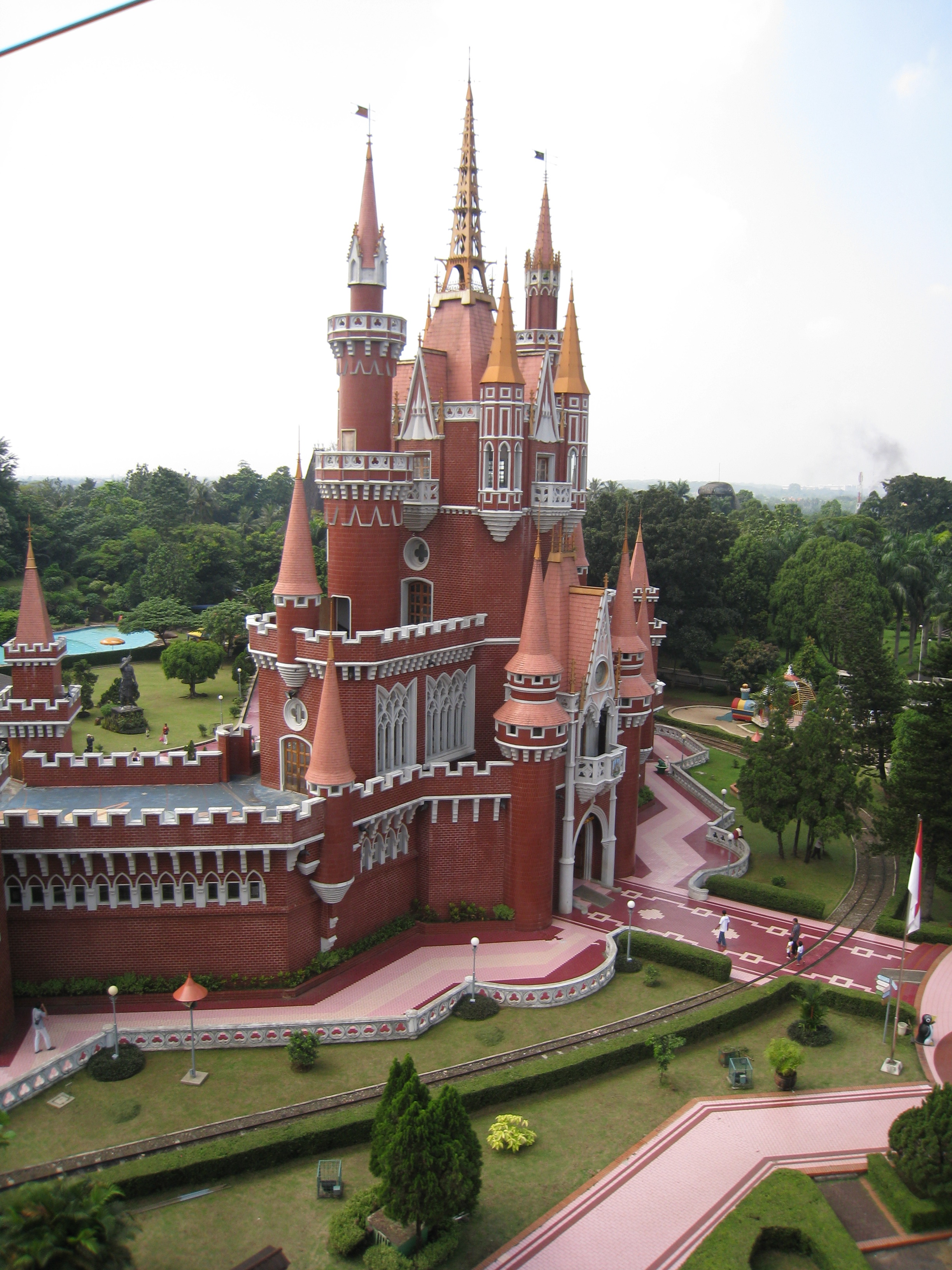
Indonesian Children Castle

- Istana Anak-Anak Indonesia (Indonesian Children Castle) – It has a playground for children, replicas of Indonesian traditional musical instruments, and an exhibition room for wayang performances and children's drawings.
- Saudjana viewing tower – An observation tower built during the 2022 revitalization that allow visitors to see the vast view of the archipelago lake and the 360° view of whole over TMII. Located at the west side of the archipelago lake.
- Skyworld Indonesia – It is an astronomy and space exploration museum located north of the West Sumatra pavilion. It also has a small planetarium and a 5D theatre. Skyworld have numbers of replicas of space rocket from various countries.
- Taman Among Putro kiddy rides park
- Desa Seni dan Kerajinan handicraft center
- Rare books market
- Telaga Mina fishing pond
- Warna Alam outbound camp

=== Lodgings ===
- Desa Wisata hostel
- Graha Wisata Remaja, a specialized hostel for teenagers and youths

=== Restaurants ===
- Caping Gunung restaurant
- Pasar Nusantara Sarinah TMII – A new foodcourt at the north of the Aceh pavilion and east of Skyworld Indonesia, offering a variety of cuisines from whole over Indonesia. Opened on 4 April 2025, it is co-managed by TMII and retail company Sarinah, the sister company of TMII's manager (InJourney Destination Management).
- Various cafeterias, F&B booths, and warungs available throughout the park featuring Indonesian cuisines such as pecel, soto, gado-gado, nasi goreng and satay.

=== Demolished/closed parts or buildings ===
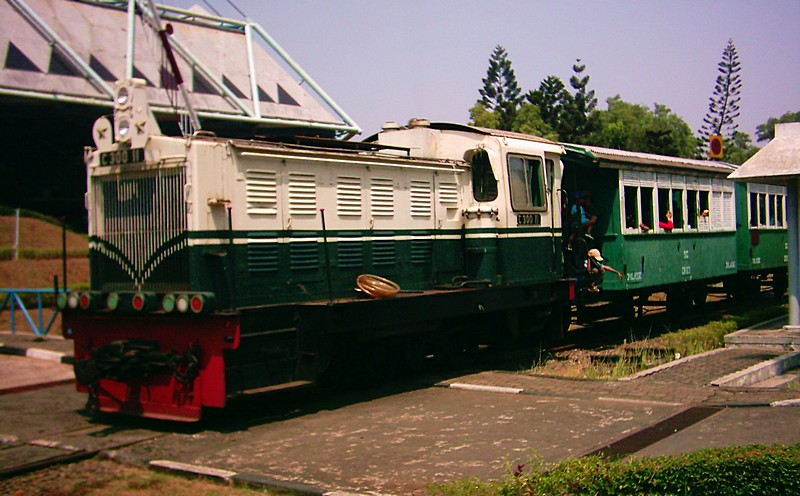
Diesel hydraulic loco C30011 that formerly serves on TMII railway tracks.

- Snowbay Waterpark – The water park was considered irrelevant with the cultural spirit of TMII and brought profits to the water park only. A new parking building now stands on the Snowbay Waterpark site.
- Telecommunications Museum – The museum had already abandoned when the ownership of TMII was handovered to the government in 2021. The building was demolished during the revitalization, and turned into a new public plaza. The statue of Gajah Mada, which was the icon the museum, is retained, so the plaza is named the 'Gajah Mada Plaza'.
- Sports Museum (now became a new parking lot)
- Dunia Inline roller skate track (now becomes the pedestrian entrance at gate 3, southwest of Keong Emas Theatre)
- 4D Theatre (now stands the Saudjana viewing tower)
- Garuda Theatre – It was used as the venue for Kabaddi competitions at the 2018 Asian Games. The theatre was demolished for the construction of the Cultural Stage.
- Taman Ria Atmaja Park, a permanent stage for cultural and music performances (replaced by the Cultural Stage)
- Taman Mini Railway (permanently closed) – The railway had first closed in 2013 for refurbishments, then reopened in 2017. By 2022, all railway tracks were dismantled for the revitalization, leaving two locomotives (TC1011 and CFL-60 DZ) sitting on where the main station used to stand.

== Public transportation access ==
TMII area is indirectly connected with TMII LRT station serving the Cibubur Line of the Jabodebek LRT via a free shuttle service; the LRT station is located about 1.5 km (0.93 mi) from the main entrance gate. It is also indirectly served by Transjakarta BRT services on corridor 9 (Pinang Ranti–Pluit) and 9C (Pinang Ranti–Bundaran Senayan) at Makasar BRT station, which is located 1.8 km (1.1 mi) from the main entrance gate. Despite that, Transjakarta operate feeder routes that directly serves TMII, which includes corridor 7D (TMII–Tegal Parang) feeder route, JAK-36 (Cilangkap–Cililitan) and JAK-108 (Kramat Jati–Bambu Apus) Mikrotrans routes; using microbus or angkot fleets.

== Gallery ==
Tourists take a ride on this cable car to enjoy bird-eye view of this park

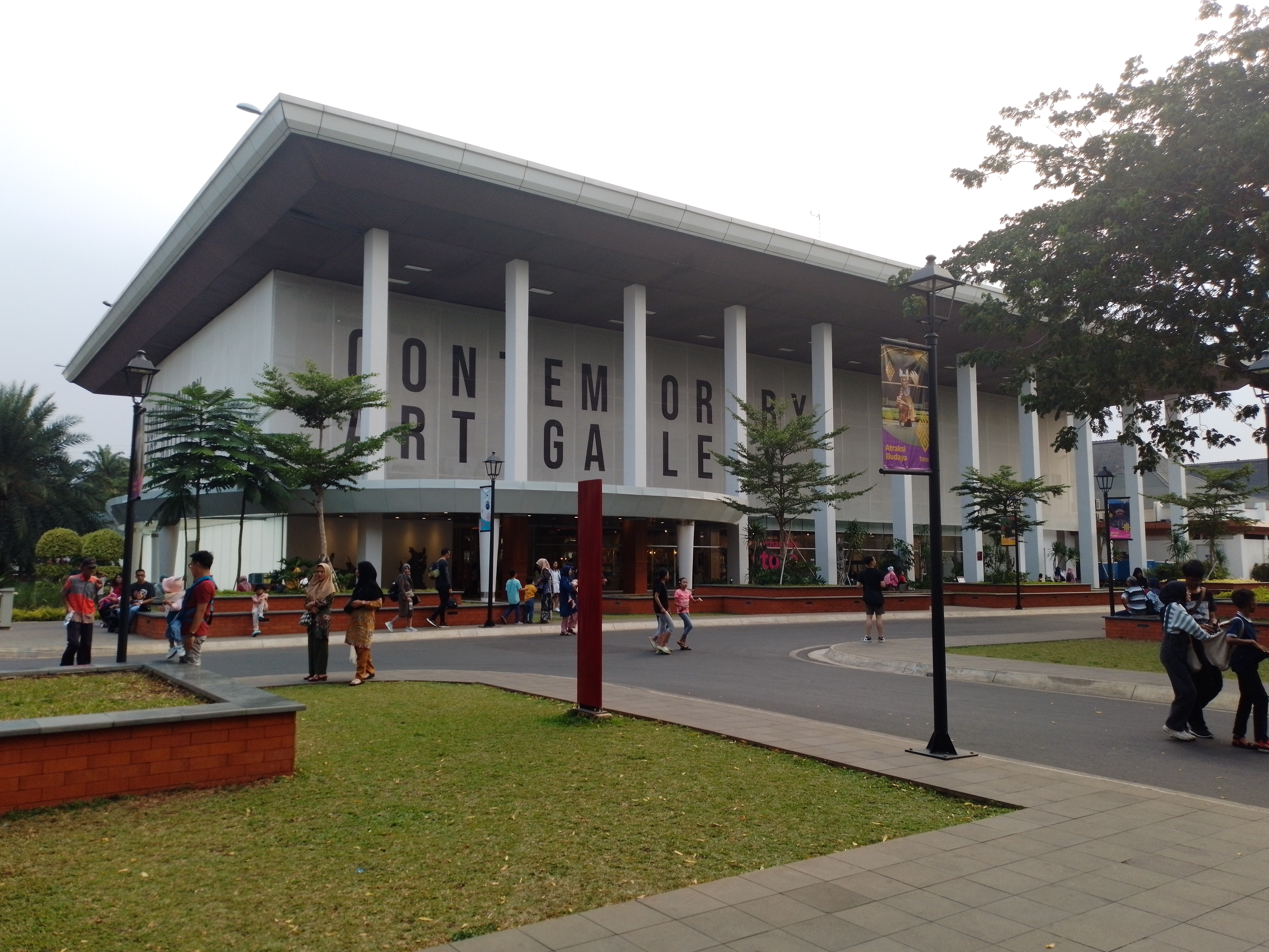
Contemporary Art Gallery

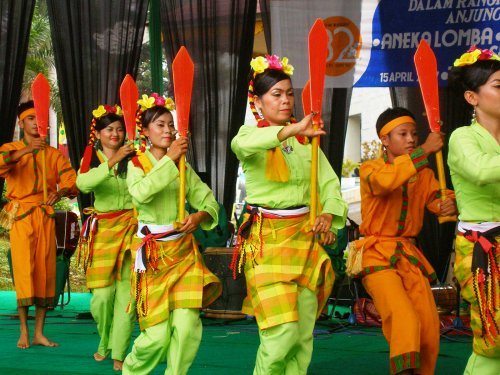
Riau dancers

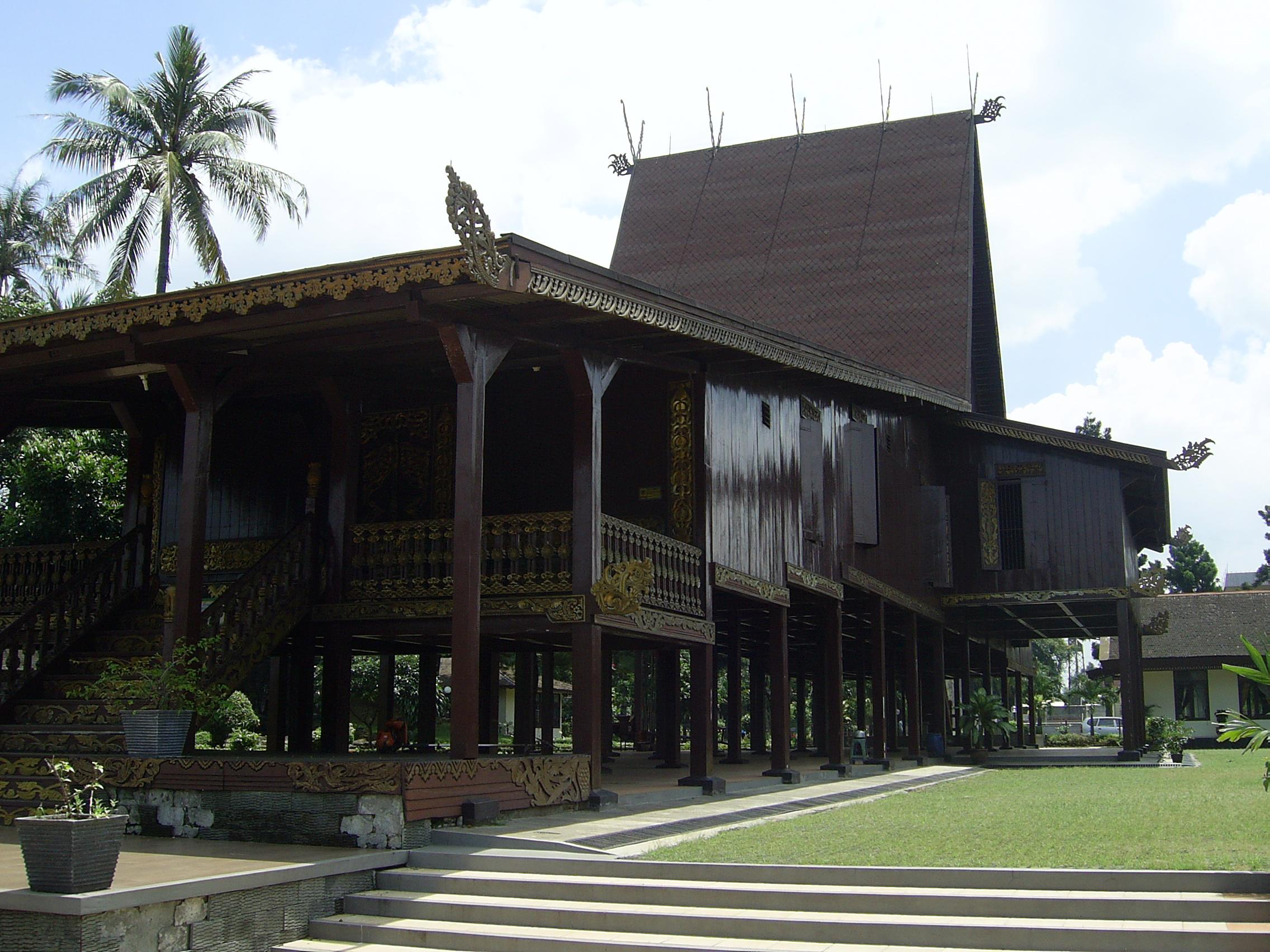
South Kalimantan pavilion in TMII

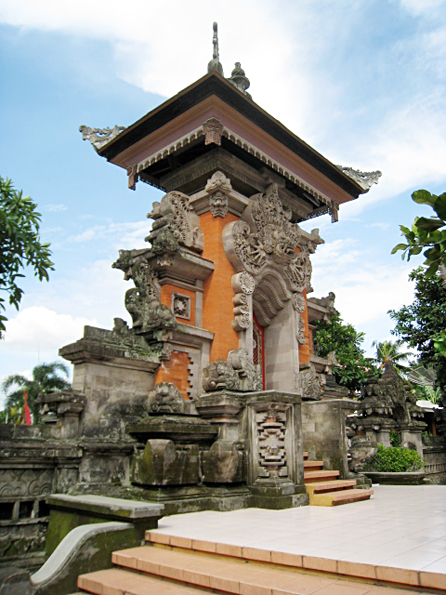
Bali pavilion gate

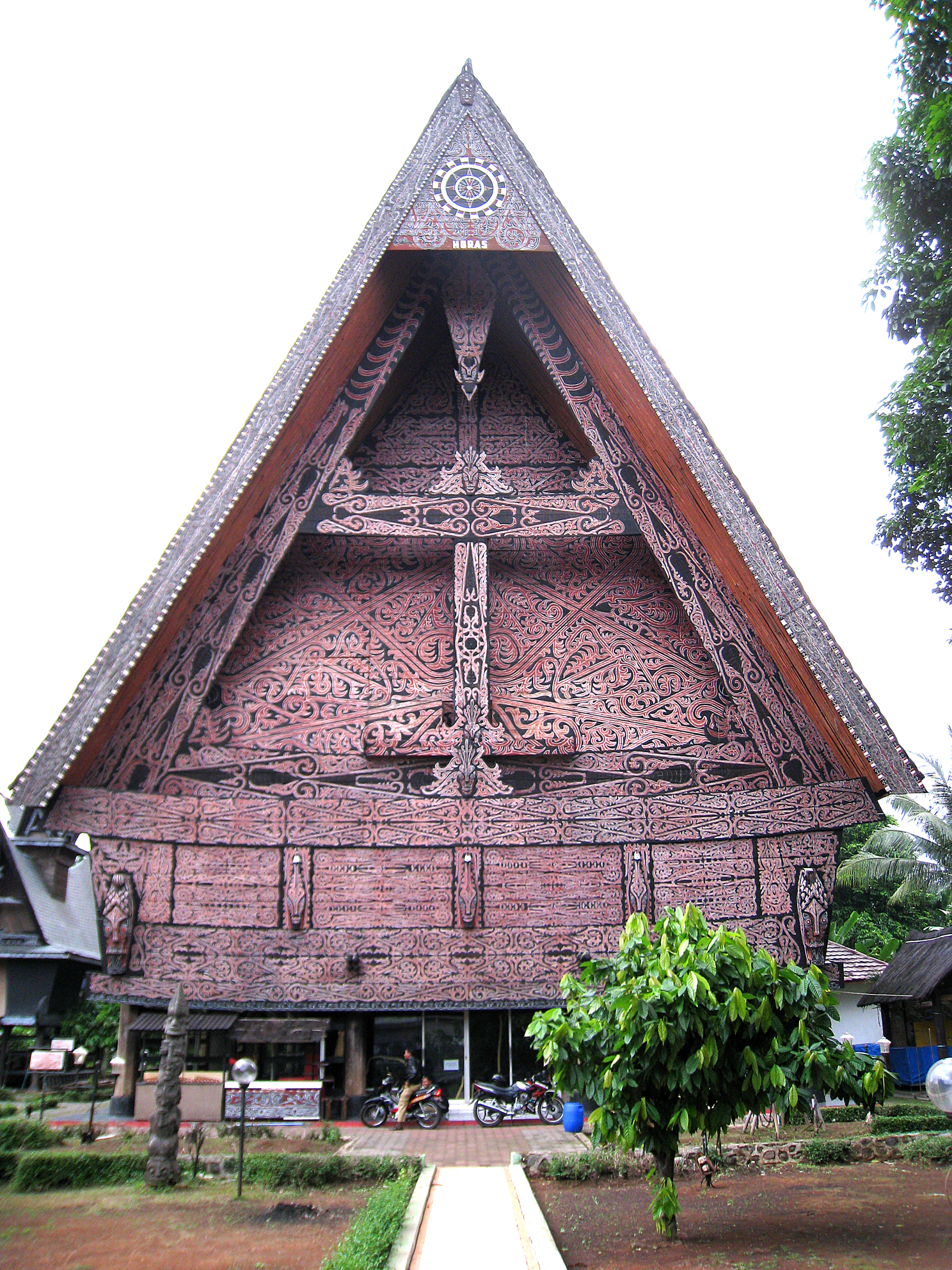
Toba Batak house at North Sumatra pavilion

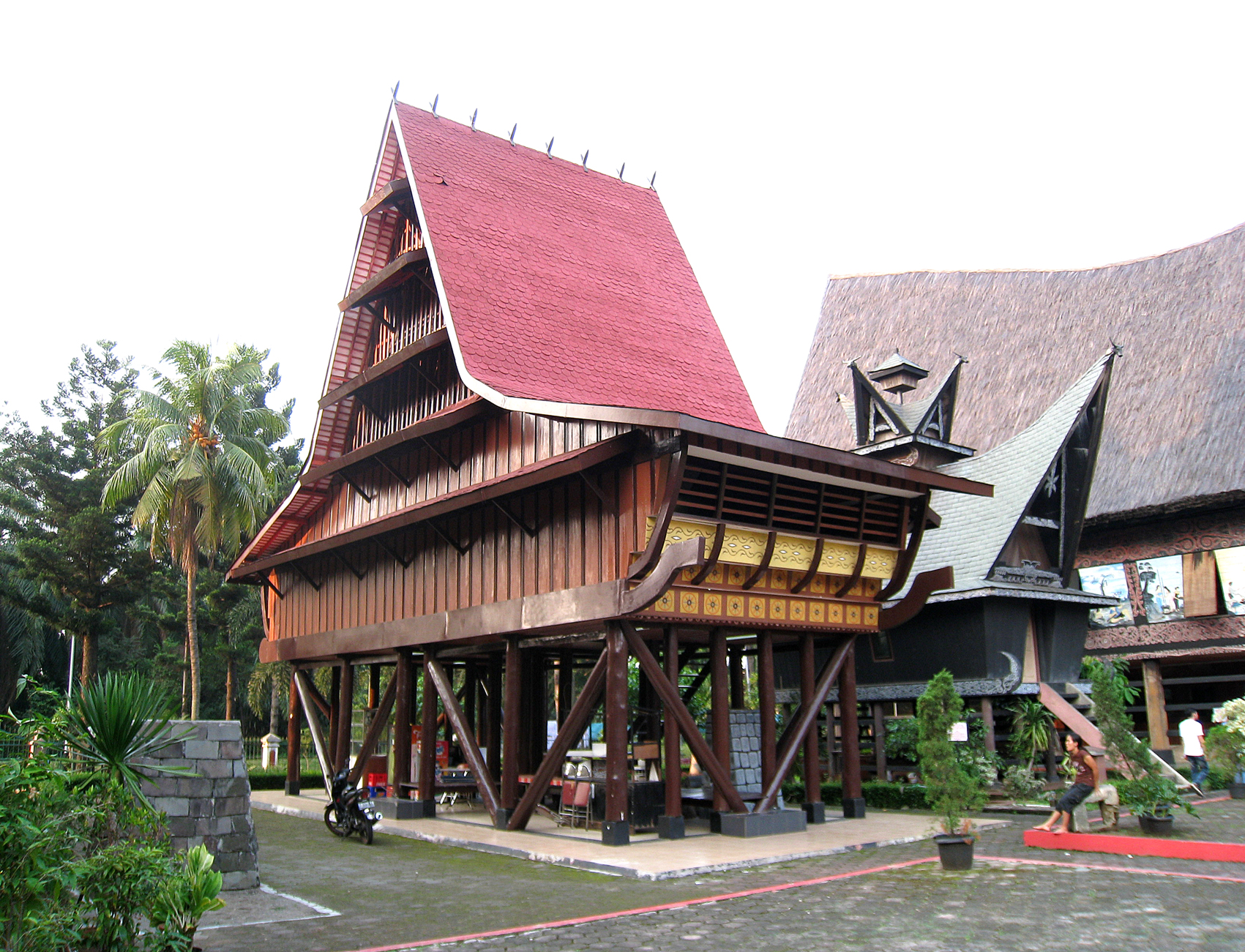
Nias house at North Sumatra pavilion

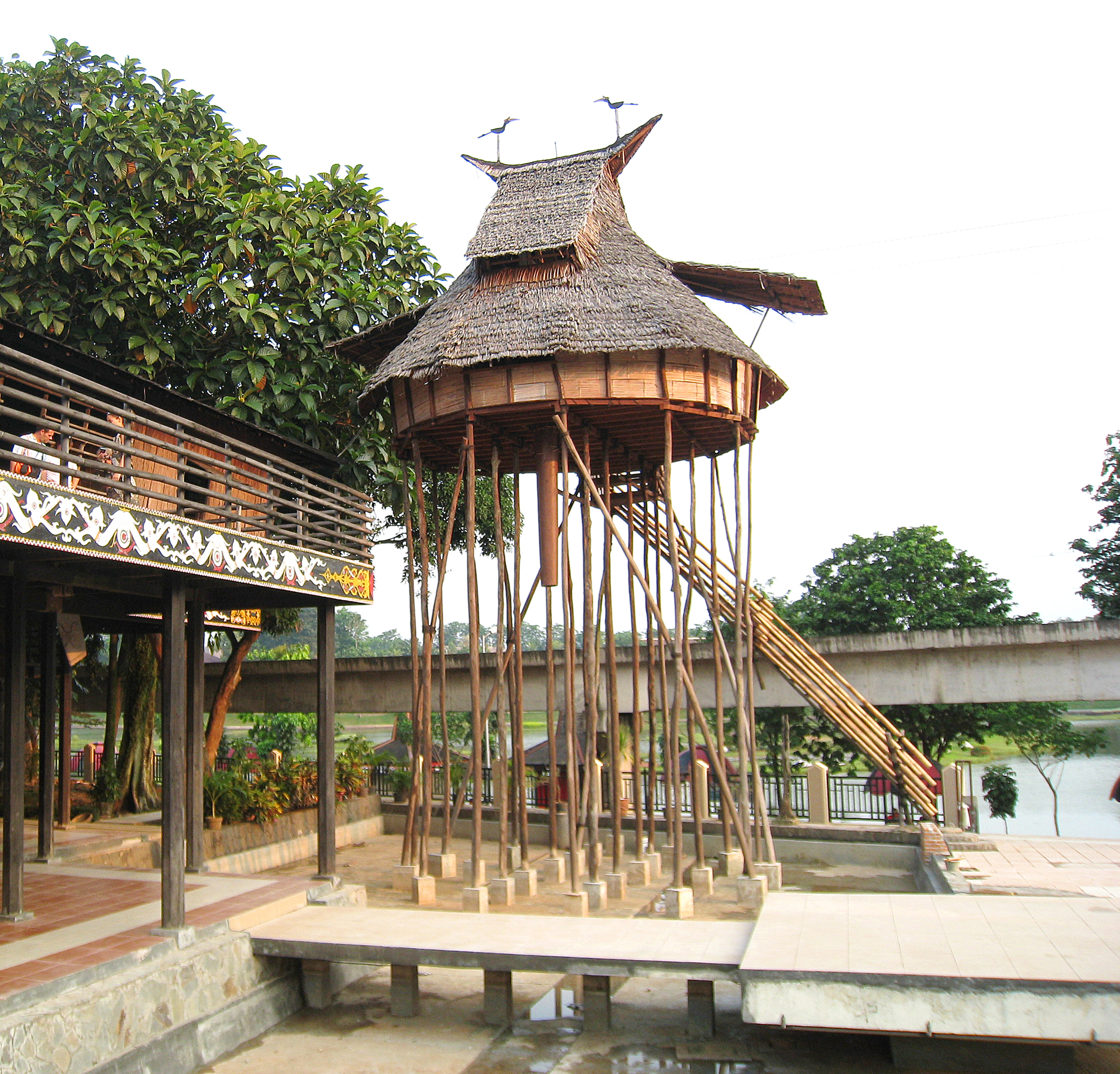
Baluk house at West Kalimantan pavilion

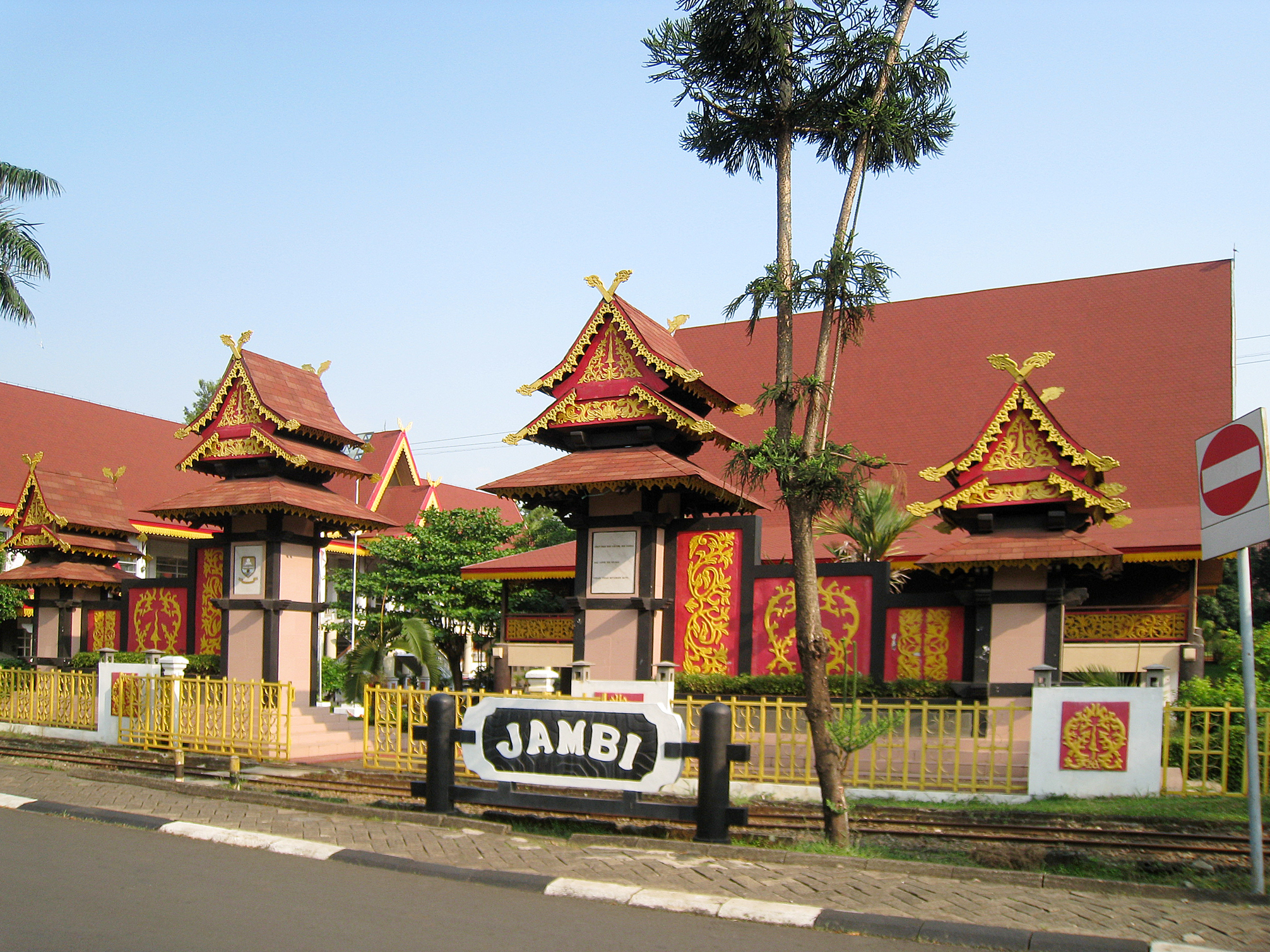
Jambi pavilion

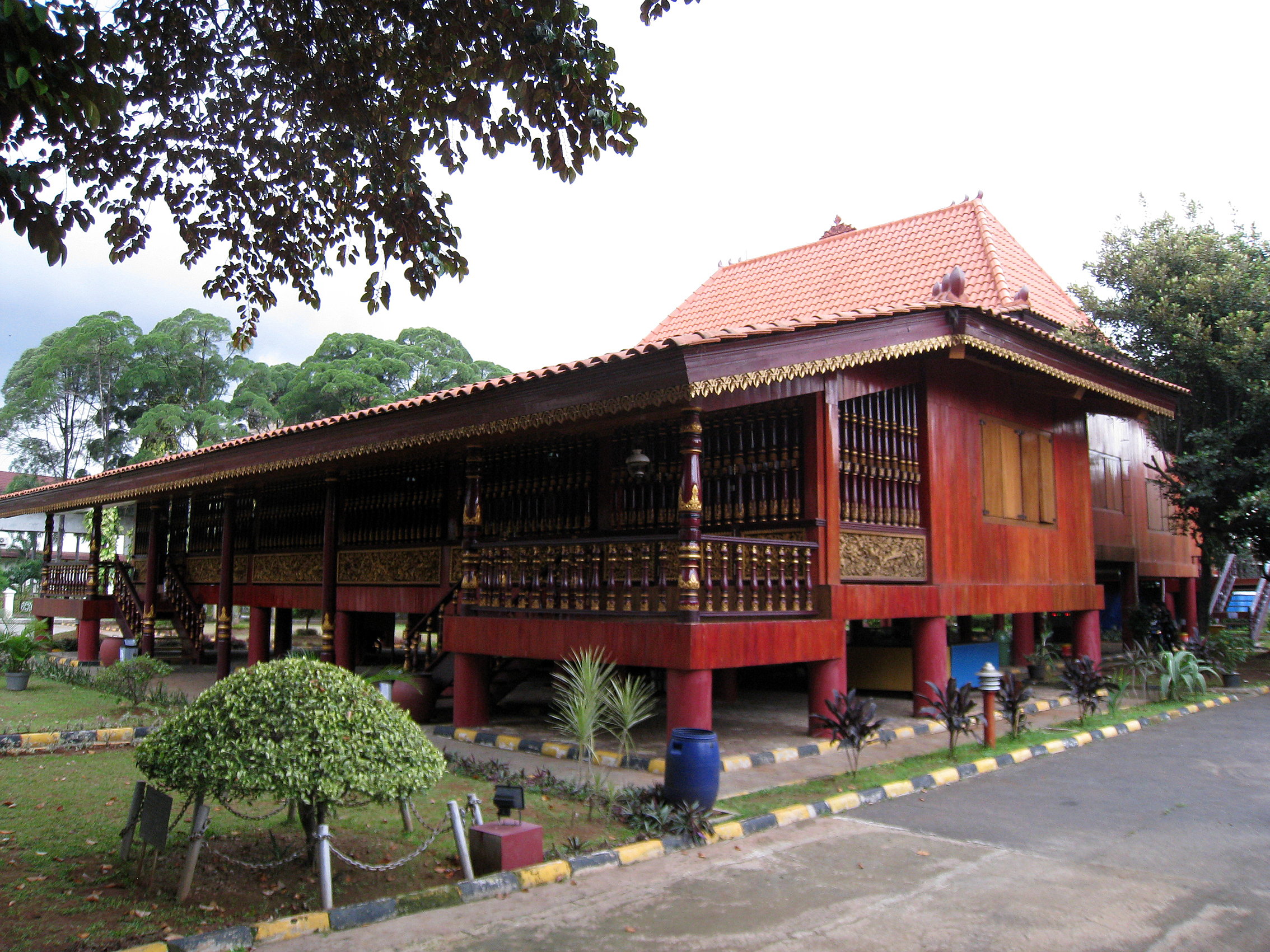
South Sumatra pavilion

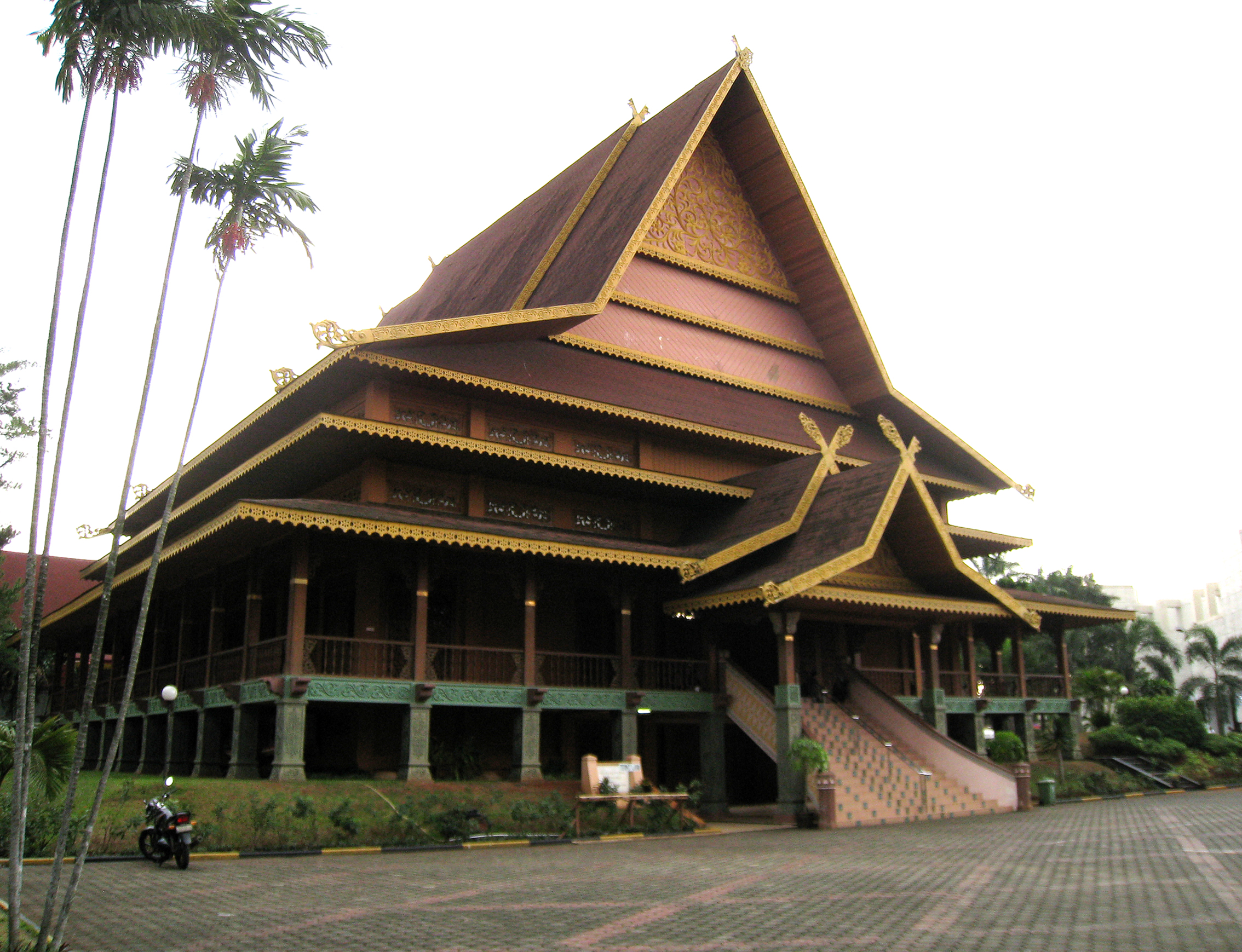
Riau pavilion

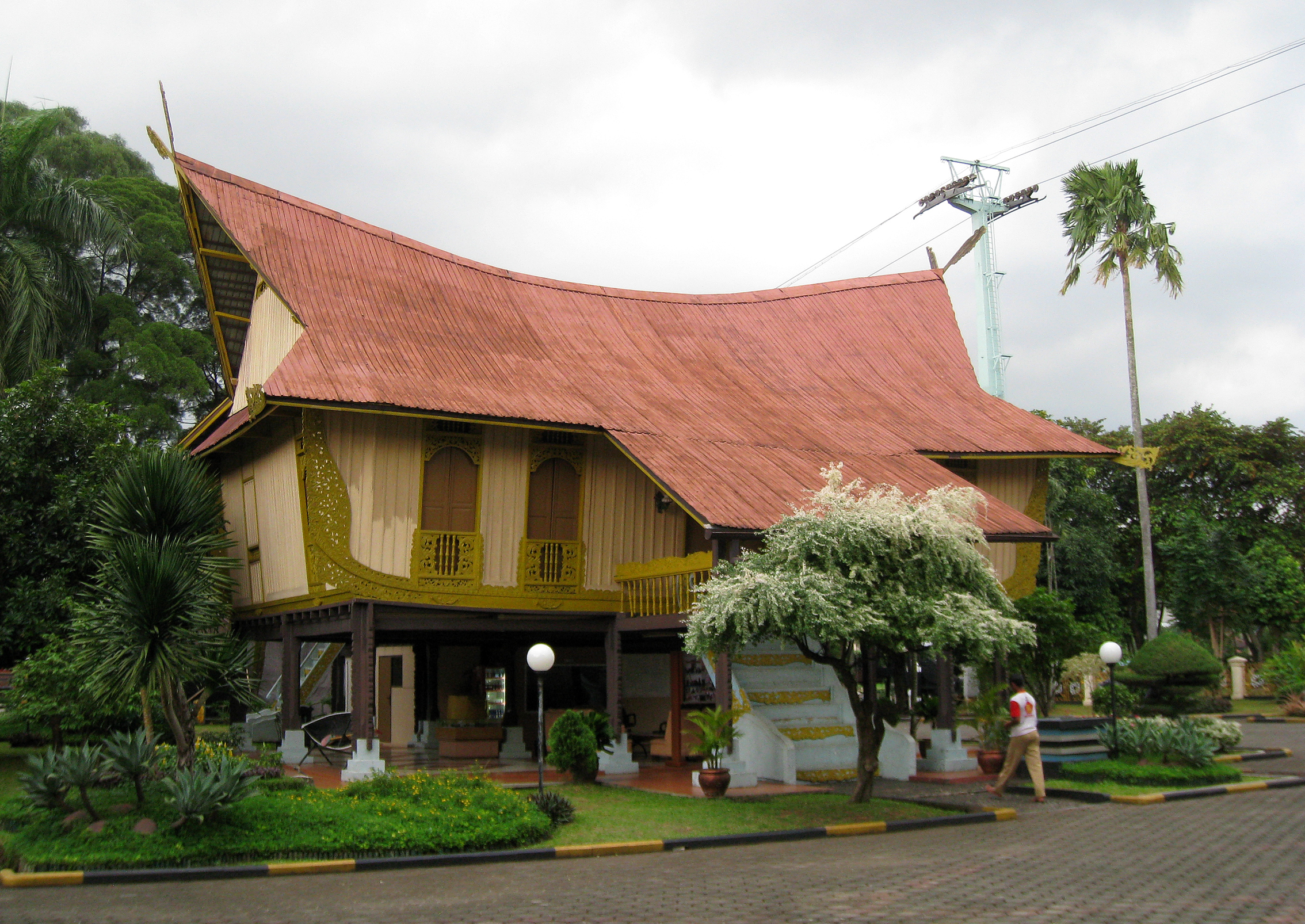
Malay house at Riau pavilion

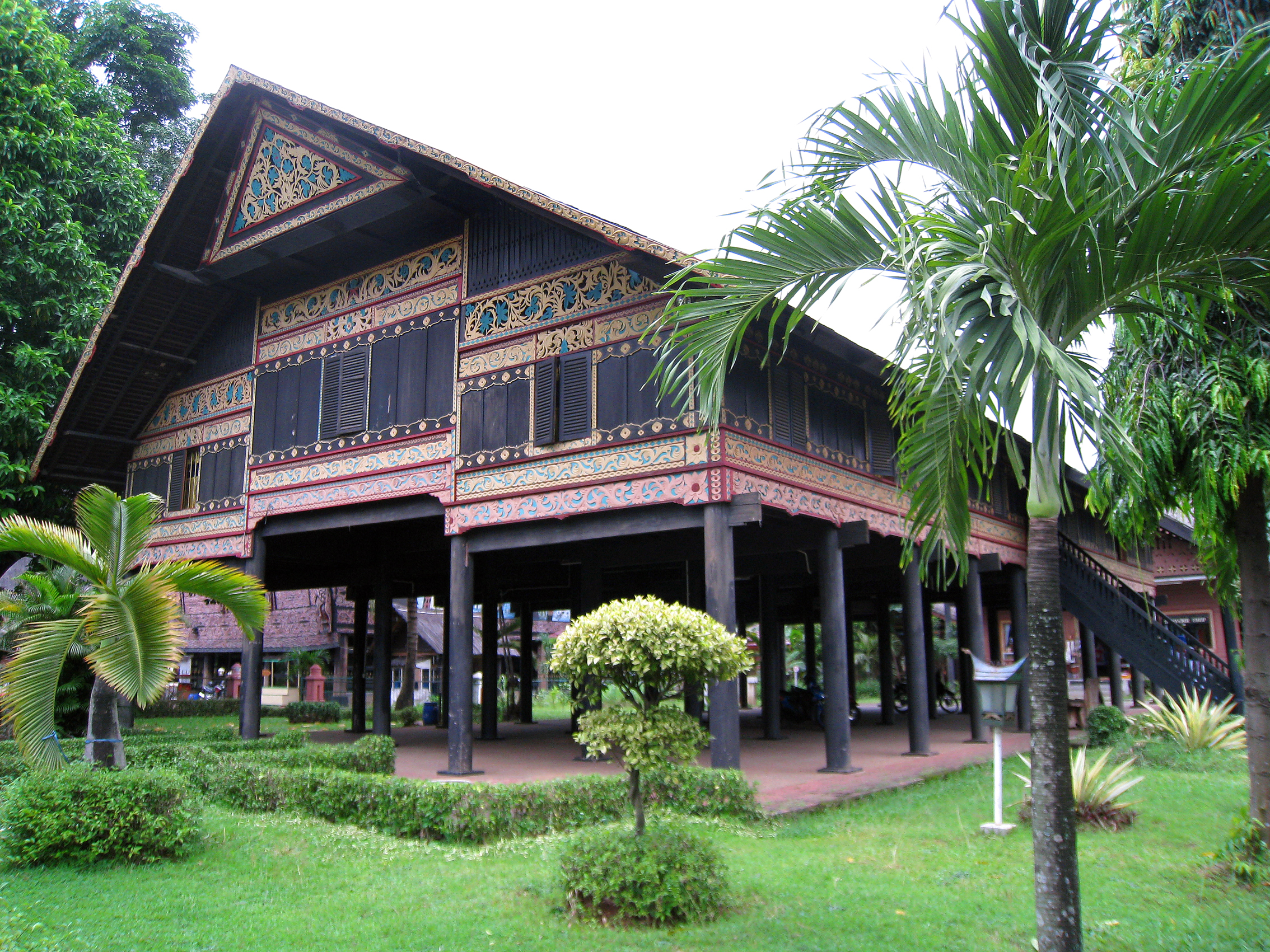
Aceh pavilion

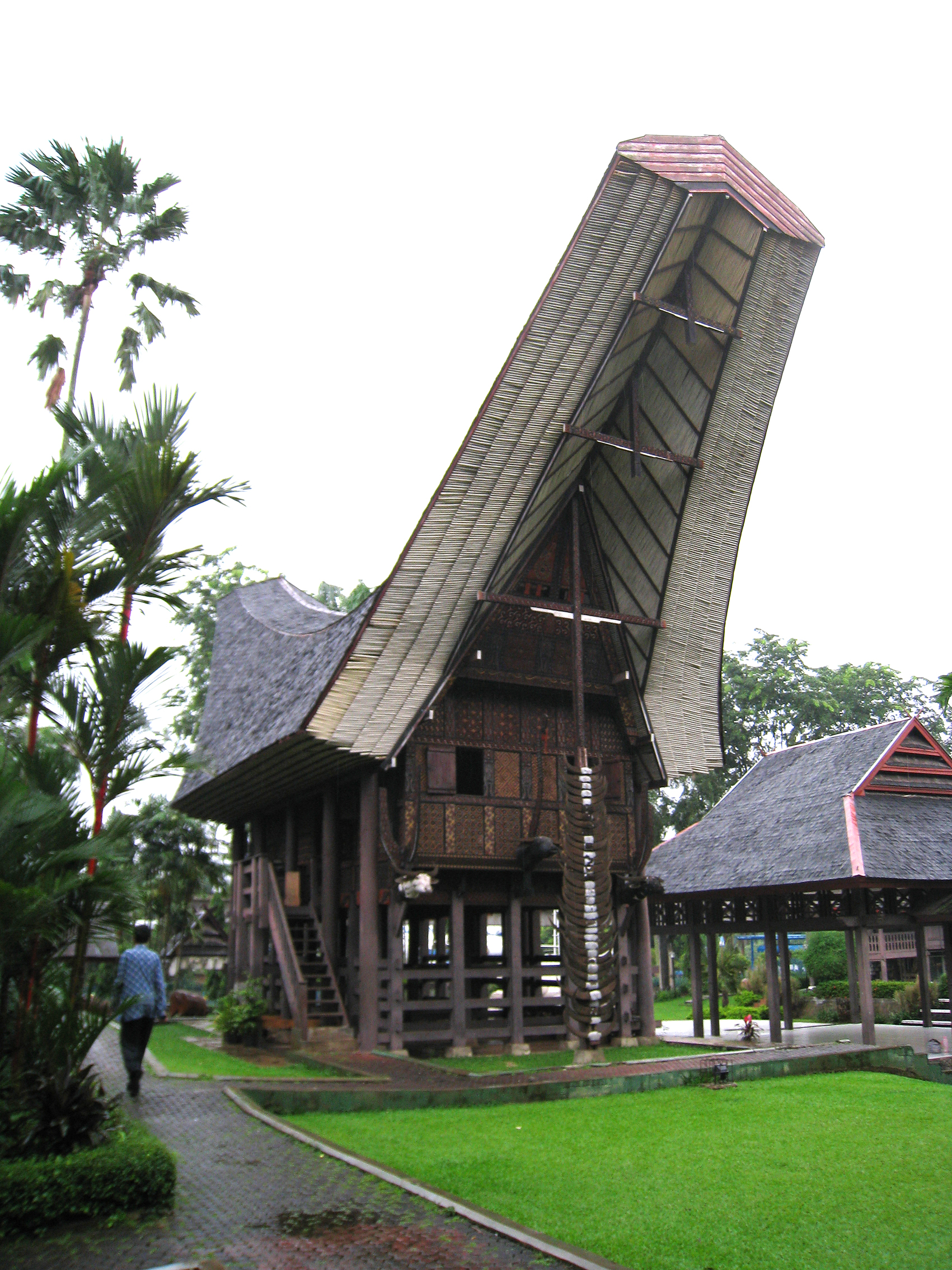
Toraja house, South Sulawesi pavilion

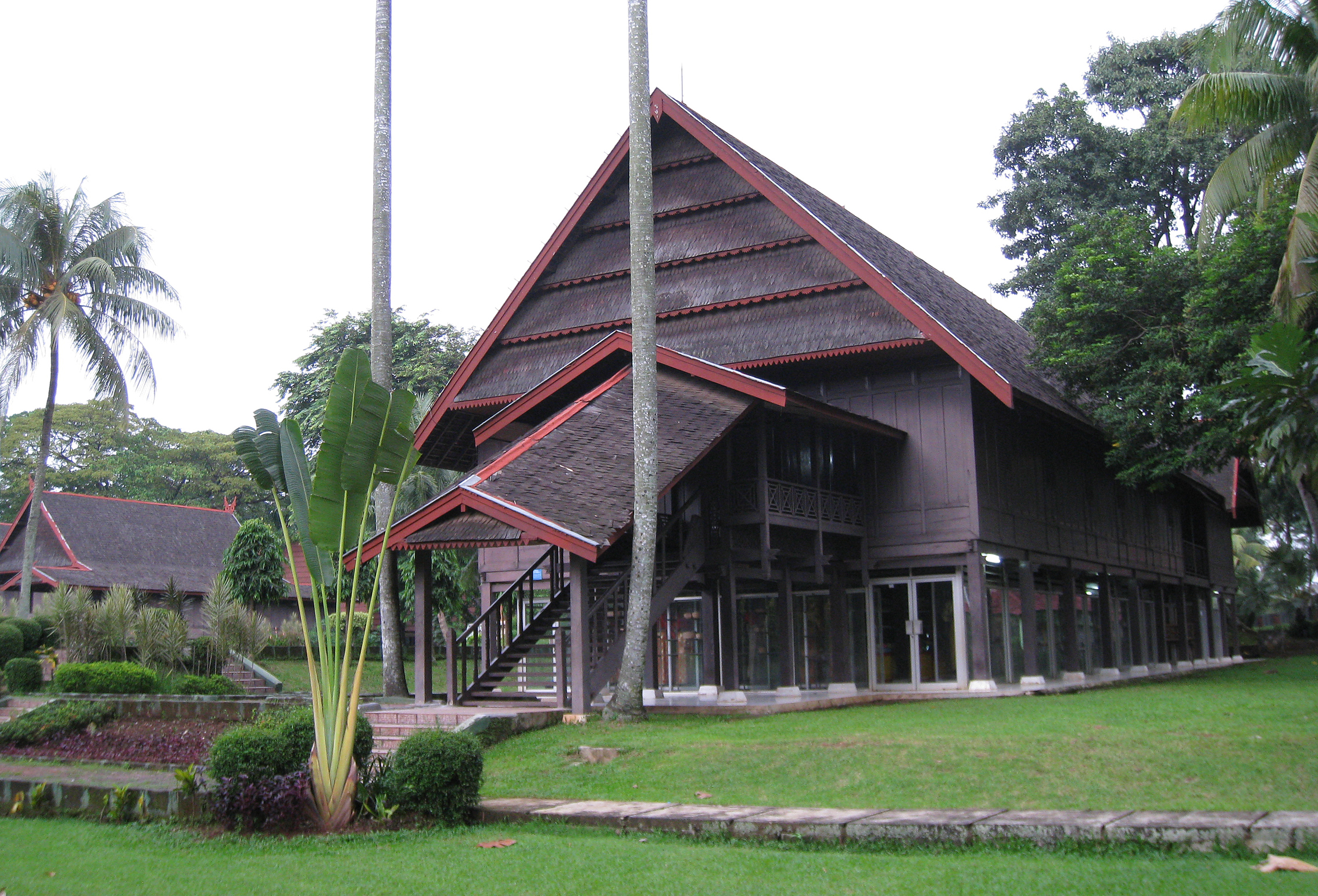
Bugis house, South Sulawesi pavilion

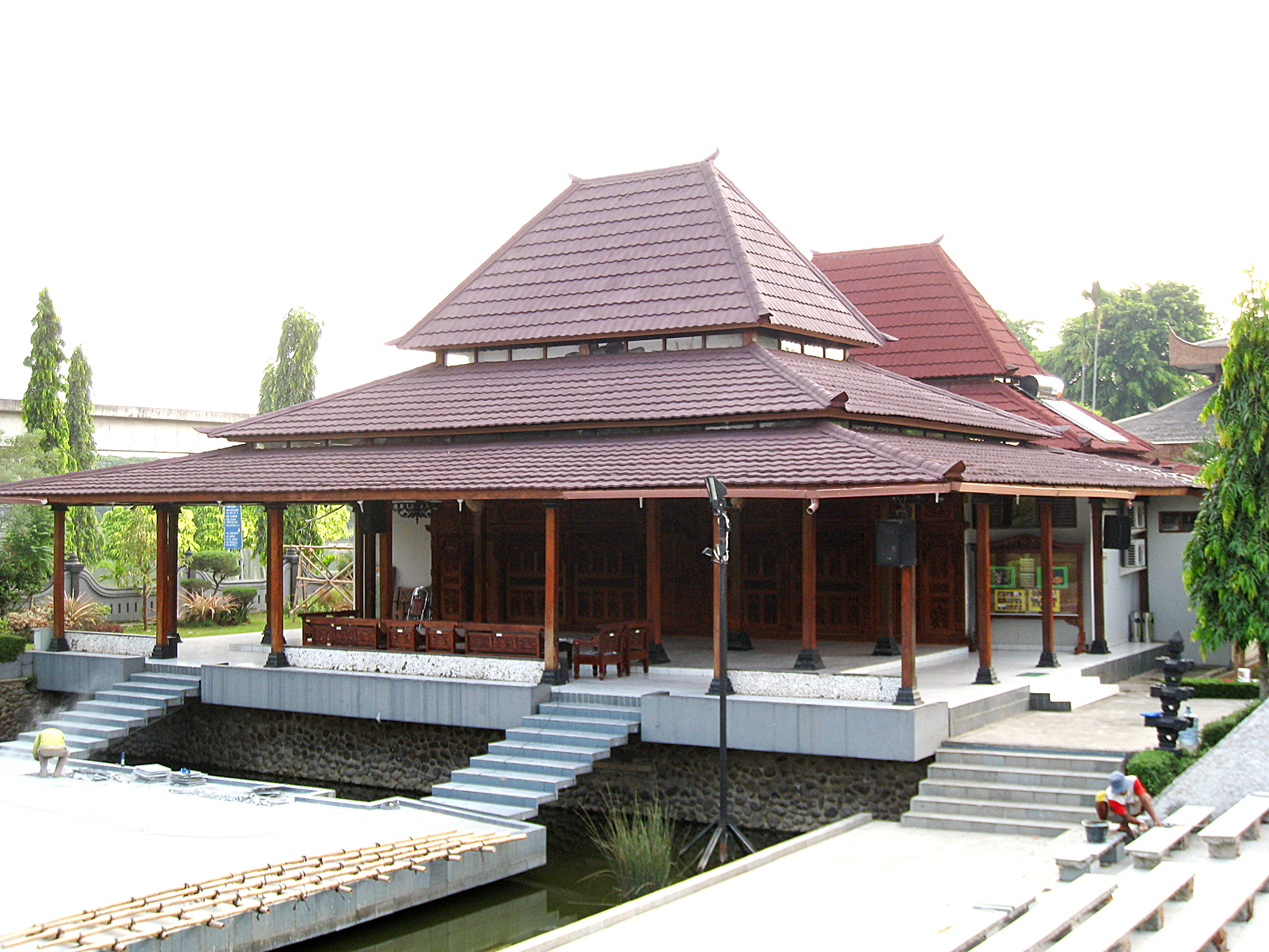
A joglo at Central Java pavilion

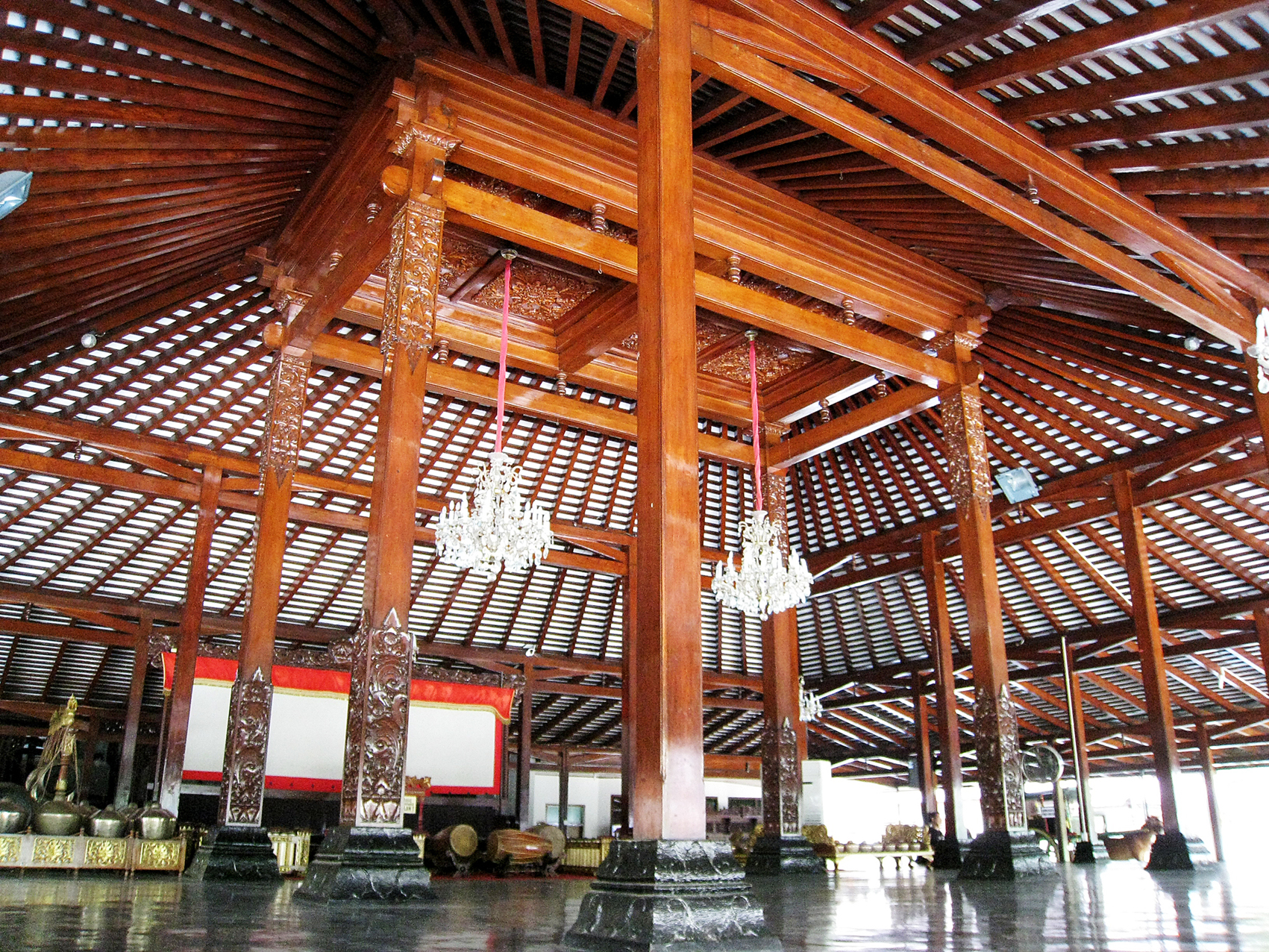
Interior of Javanese Joglo house, Central Java pavilion

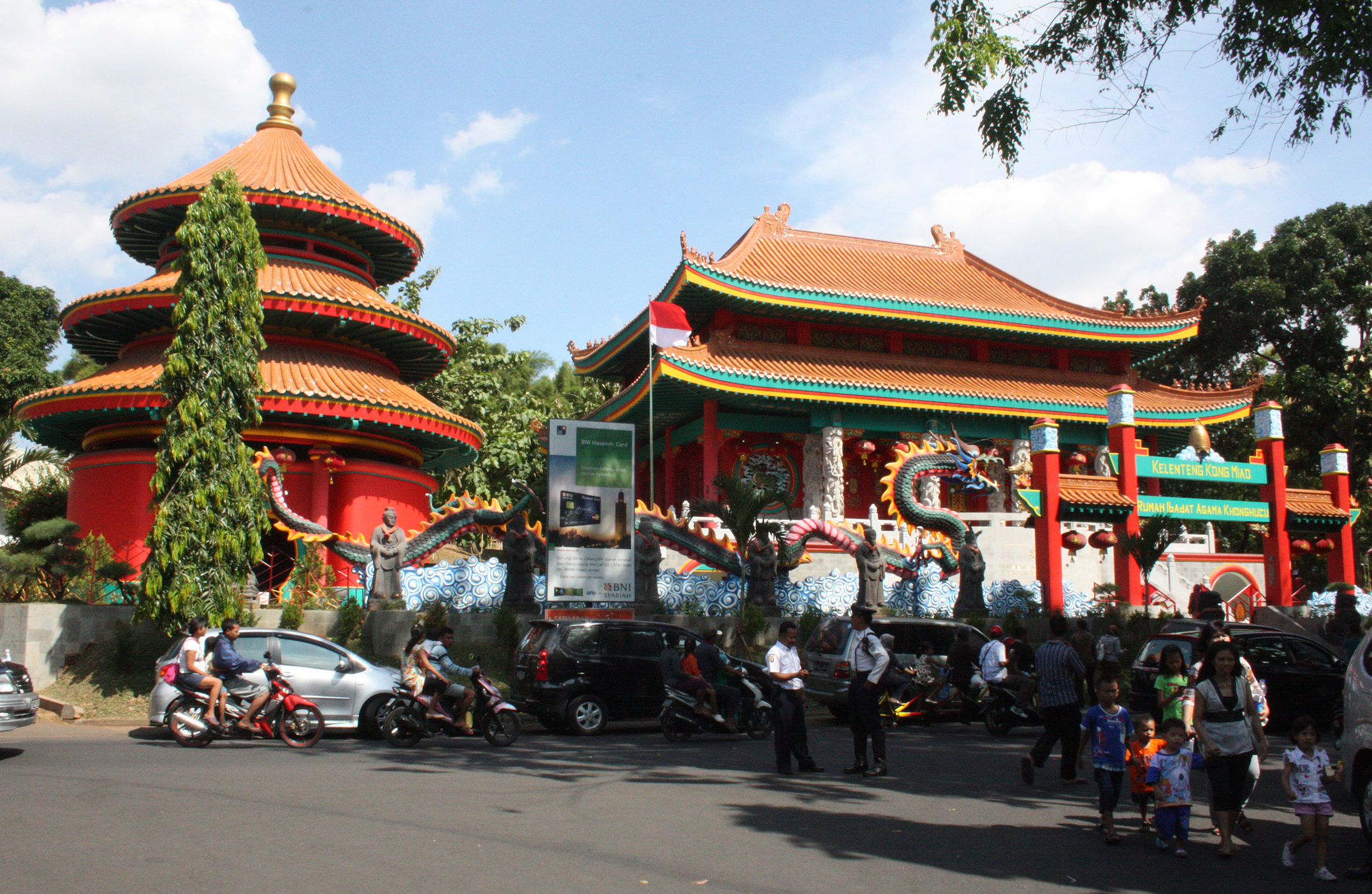
Kong Miao Confucian temple

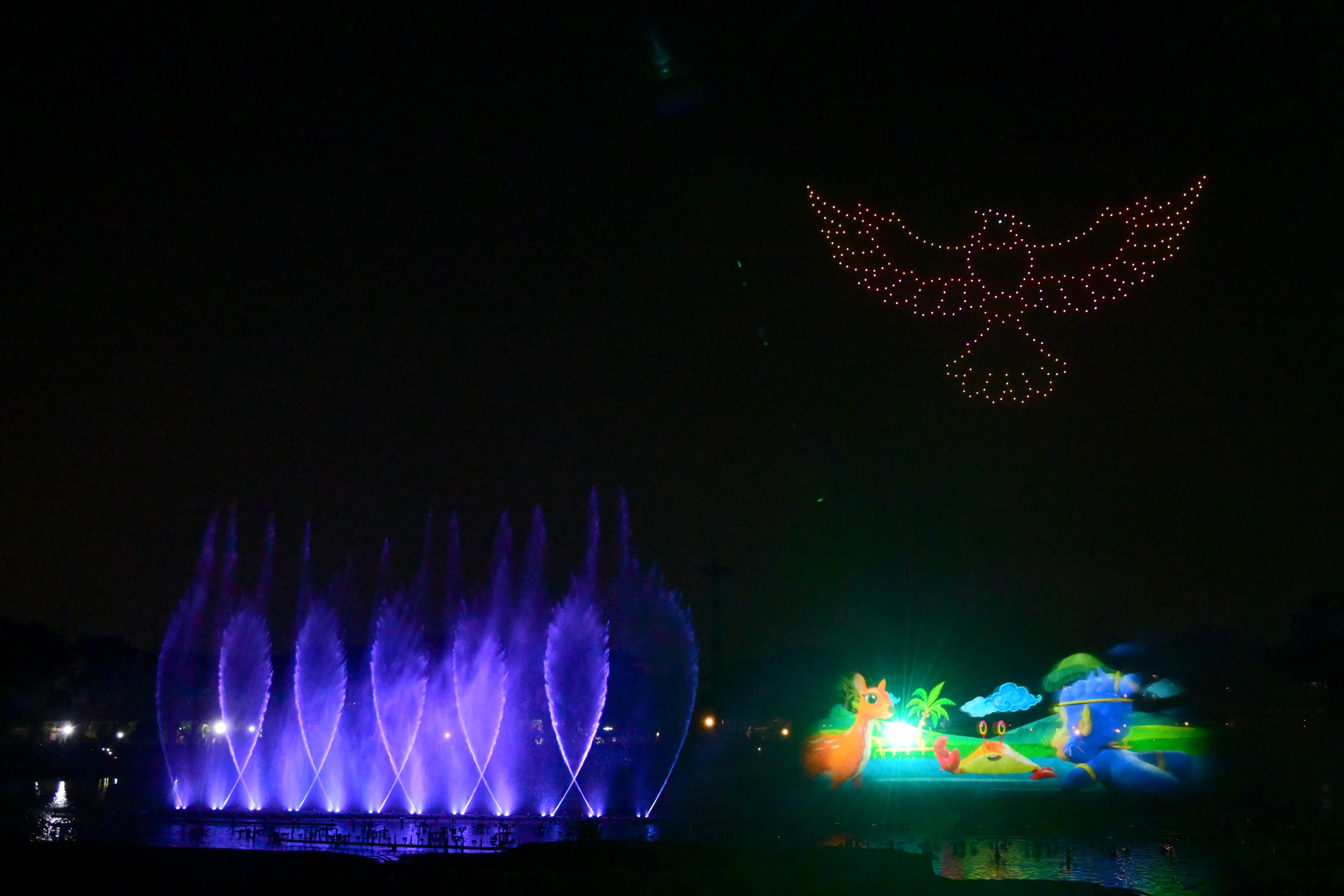
The Tirta Cerita dancing fountain and drone display at the archipelago lake every night
