= Indonesia Museum =

Ethnography and anthropology museum in Jakarta, Indonesia

Coordinates: 6°18′04″S 106°53′29″E

Indonesia Museum Museum Indonesia
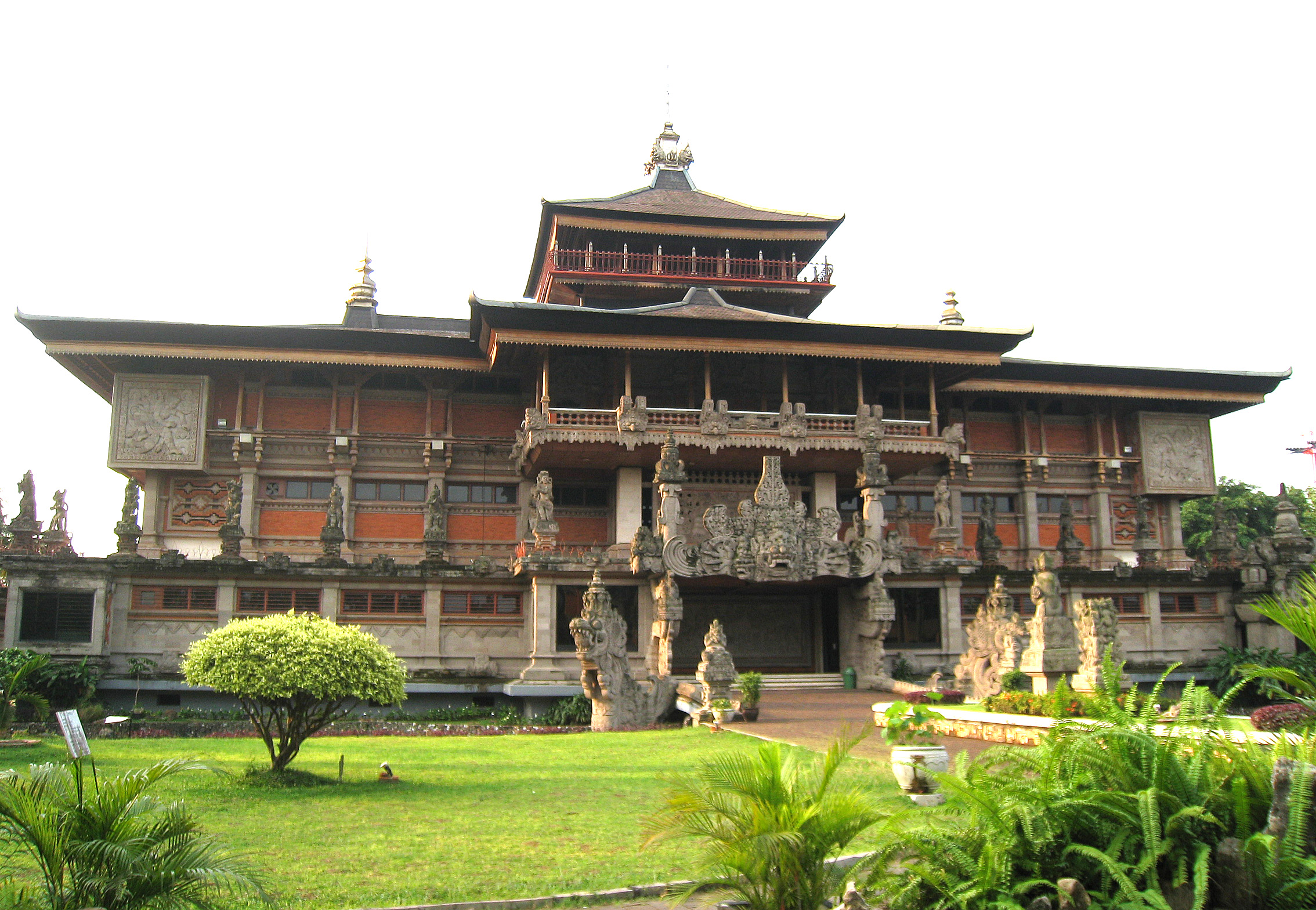
- The main building of Indonesia Museum
- Established: 1980
- Location: Taman Mini Indonesia Indah, Jakarta, Indonesia
- Type: Ethnography and Anthropology museum
- Owner: InJourney Destination Management
- Website: Museum Indonesia

The Indonesia Museum (Indonesian: Museum Indonesia), is an anthropology and ethnological museum located in Taman Mini Indonesia Indah (TMII), Jakarta, Indonesia. The museum is concentrated on arts and cultures of various ethnic groups that inhabit Indonesian archipelago and formed the modern nation of Indonesia. The museum is a richly decorated building in Balinese architecture. The museum boasts a comprehensive collection consisting of over 1,000 pieces of traditional and contemporary Indonesian arts, crafts and traditional costumes from the different regions of the nation.

== History ==
The museum was designed as the integral part of the whole Taman Mini Indonesia Indah (TMII) complex. It was meant as a learning center of Indonesian culture, "one stop to learn about Indonesia". The TMII complex was built and inaugurated in 1975 under the patronage of Mrs. Tien Suharto. The construction of the museum started in 1976 and opened to public on 20 April 1980 during the 5th anniversary of TMII.

The museum is elaborately decorated with Balinese statues and ornaments. It was built in Balinese architectural style. Some large Paduraksa and Candi Bentar (split portal) style Balinese gates, as well as several corner towers adorn the complex. The museum park took the theme of Ramayana Hindu epic; the bridge to the main building took the form of Nāga serpents with vanara ape army that built a bridge to Lanka.

The museum was built in Balinese architecture by a Balinese architect Ida Bagus Tugur. The main building consists of three floors in accordance with Balinese philosophy of Tri Hita Karana, the concept that emphasizes the three aspects of a human's complete happiness; to nurture harmony with God, with fellow human beings, and with nature.

== Collections ==
The permanent exhibits and collections are arranged in three sections located on each of three floors.

=== First floor ===
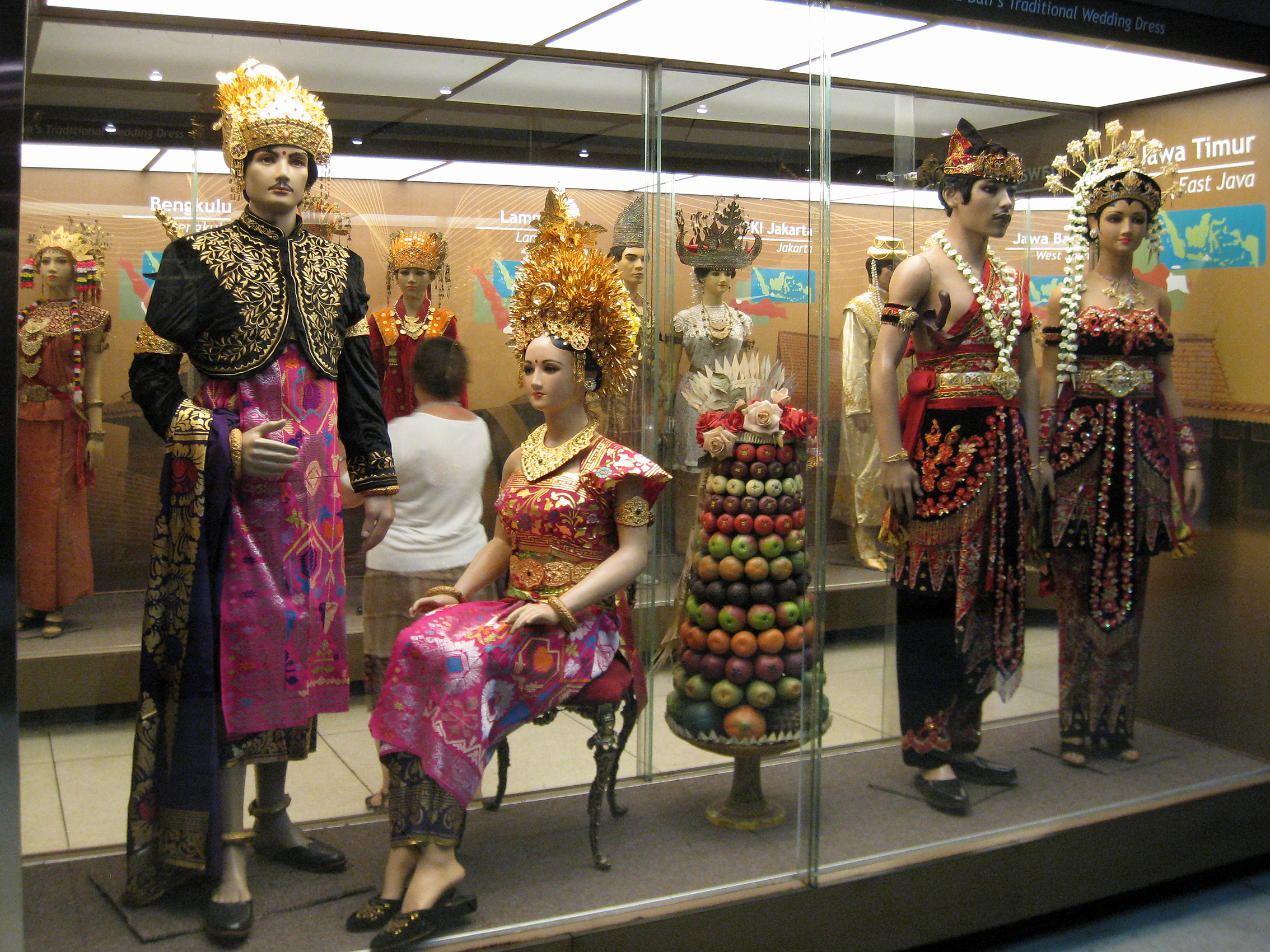
The traditional wedding dress of Native Indonesian ethnic groups

The theme of the first floor exhibit is Bhinneka Tunggal Ika (Unity in Diversity). It features traditional formal dress and wedding costumes of 27 provinces of Indonesia (Indonesian provinces from 1975 to 2000). The exhibit also displays Indonesian artforms, such as various types of dances, wayang and gamelan, also the painted glass map of Indonesia. The exhibit displays the rich diversity of Indonesian people and culture and also celebrates the pluralism of Indonesia, formed from different languages, traditions, religions, cultures, and customs.

=== Second floor ===
Manusia dan Lingkungan (Human and Environment) is the theme of the second floor exhibit. It is meant to showcase the interaction of Indonesian people with nature and the environment. The exhibit features different traditional houses, religious buildings, rice barn, and the layout of the houses and living spaces. These include houses built on elevated platforms, built on trees or on the river, and various styles of traditional vernacular buildings.

The dioramas of parts of Indonesian traditional houses include a Palembang wedding room, Javanese middle living room, and Batak kitchen. Objects used in daily life, such as for hunting, gathering, farming, and agricultural objects are also on display. The ceremonies concerning the human life cycle are presented, such as Mitoni (seventh month of pregnancy) ceremony, Turun Tanah ceremony (a ceremony for baby), Khitanan (circumcision) ceremony, Mapedes ceremony (Balinese coming-of-age ceremony incorporates teeth cutting), Datuk (traditional community leader) inauguration ceremony, and Minangkabau Pelaminan (wedding throne).

=== Third floor ===
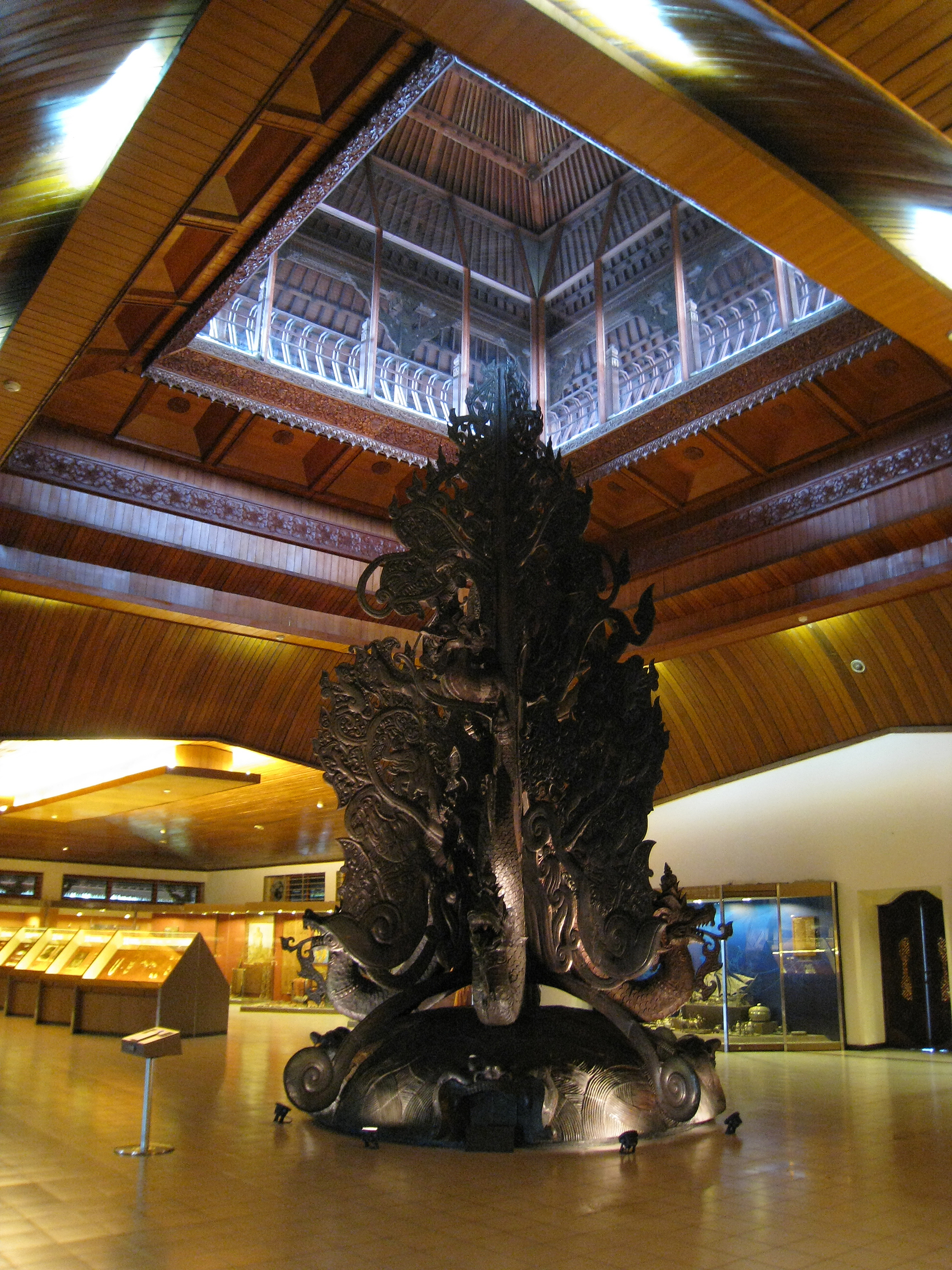
The 8-metre tall Kalpataru tree of life, the centerpiece of the third floor

Seni dan Kriya (Arts and Crafts) is the theme of the third floor. The room showcases the traditional and contemporary arts and crafts of Indonesian people. Traditional textile crafts such as Songket, Tenun (weaving), and batik are on display as well as metal and wooden crafts.

The intricate traditional wooden carving traditions, such as the ones belonging to the Jepara (Central Java), Bali, Toraja, and Asmat culture are on display on this floor. The centerpiece of this section is a large wooden carving of the Kalpataru tree, the tree of life. This eight meters high and four meters wide tree symbolizes nature and the universe and contains five basic elements; air, water, wind, earth, and fire.

== Other events ==
Sometimes the museum also displays non-permanent or temporary exhibitions with specific themes, such as topeng (traditional mask), traditional textiles, weapons, paintings, also art and craft demonstrations; such as batik or wayang kulit making.

Other buildings within the museum complex are Balinese park, Bale Panjang, Bale Bundar, and Soko Tujuh building that are available for rent to host public or private events.
