= List of Asian Games medalists in equestrian =

This is the complete list of Asian Games medalists in equestrian from 1982 to 2022.

== Events ==
=== Individual dressage ===
Games	Gold	Silver	Bronze
1986 Seoul	Suh Jung-kyun (KOR)	Hiroshi Hoketsu (JPN)	Shin Chang-moo (KOR)
1994 Hiroshima	Mieko Yagi (JPN)	Yoshitaka Serimachi (JPN)	Shin Chang-moo (KOR)
1998 Bangkok	Suh Jung-kyun (KOR)	Shin Chang-moo (KOR)	Toshihide Takechi (JPN)
2002 Busan	Choi Jun-sang (KOR)	Suh Jung-kyun (KOR)	Naoki Hitomi (JPN)
2006 Doha	Choi Jun-sang (KOR)	Yukiko Noge (JPN)	Qabil Ambak (MAS)
2010 Guangzhou	Hwang Young-shik (KOR)	Quzandria Nur (MAS)	Qabil Ambak (MAS)
2014 Incheon	Hwang Young-shik (KOR)	Kim Dong-seon (KOR)	Larasati Gading (INA)
2018 Jakarta–Palembang	Jacqueline Siu (HKG)	Qabil Ambak (MAS)	Kim Hyeok (KOR)
2022 Hangzhou	Qabil Ambak (MAS)	Jacqueline Siu (HKG)	Anush Agarwalla (IND)
2026 Aichi-Nagoya	Dongheon Nam (KOR)	Jiayi Yu (CHN)	Jiayi Rao (CHN)

=== Team dressage ===
Games	Gold	Silver	Bronze
1986 Seoul	South Korea (KOR); Shin Chang-moo; Suh Jung-kyun; Suh In-kyo	Japan (JPN); Osamu Nakamata; Hiroshi Hoketsu; Naoko Sakurai	India (IND); Jitendarjit Singh Ahluwalia; Ghulam Mohammed Khan; Raghubir Singh
1994 Hiroshima	Japan (JPN); Mieko Yagi; Masumi Shimoda; Yoshitaka Serimachi	South Korea (KOR); Shin Chang-moo; Suh Jung-kyun; Choi Myung-jin	Chinese Taipei (TPE); Lan Chung-hsiung; Chen Hsiang-fu; Kang Yu
1998 Bangkok	South Korea (KOR); Choi Myung-jin; Suh Jung-kyun; Shin Chang-moo; Shin Soo-jin	Malaysia (MAS); Wan Zaleha Radzi; Syed Omar Al-Mohdzar; Qabil Ambak; Quzandria Nur	Thailand (THA); Nitipat Ngao-osa; Suwat Bunlue; Chuenchom Chutima; Chalermcharn Chamswad
2002 Busan	South Korea (KOR); Choi Jun-sang; Suh Jung-kyun; Shin Chang-moo; Kim Jung-keun	Japan (JPN); Hiroyuki Kitahara; Naoki Hitomi; Masumi Yokokawa; Yuriko Miyoshi	China (CHN); Huang Zhuoqin; Zhang Lijun; Gu Bing
2006 Doha	South Korea (KOR); Choi Jun-sang; Kim Dong-seon; Shin Soo-jin; Suh Jung-kyun	Malaysia (MAS); Diani Lee; Putri Alia Soraya; Quzandria Nur; Qabil Ambak	Japan (JPN); Kumiko Sakamoto; Masanao Takahashi; Asuka Sakurai; Yukiko Noge
2010 Guangzhou	South Korea (KOR); Choi Jun-sang; Kim Kyun-sub; Kim Dong-seon; Hwang Young-shik	China (CHN); Gu Bing; Huang Zhuoqin; Cai Qiao; Liu Lina	Malaysia (MAS); Diani Lee; Qabil Ambak; Quzandria Nur; Putri Alia Soraya
2014 Incheon	South Korea (KOR); Kim Kyun-sub; Chung Yoo-yeon; Kim Dong-seon; Hwang Young-shik	Japan (JPN); Mayumi Okunishi; Kazuki Sado; Tomoko Nakamura; Shingo Hayashi	Chinese Taipei (TPE); Wang Ko-wen; Chang Yu-chieh; Kuo Li-yu; Yeh Hsiu-hua
2018 Jakarta–Palembang	Japan (JPN); Masanao Takahashi; Shunsuke Terui; Kazuki Sado; Akane Kuroki	South Korea (KOR); Kim Chun-pil; Nam Dong-heon; Kim Kyun-sub; Kim Hyeok	Thailand (THA); Arinadtha Chavatanont; Apisada Bannagijsophon; Chalermcharn Yotviriyapanit; Pakjira Thongpakdi
2022 Hangzhou	India; Anush Agarwalla; Hriday Chheda; Divyakirti Singh; Sudipti Hajela	China; Huang Zhuoqin; Lan Chao; Rao Jiayi	Hong Kong; Samantha Grace Chan; Annie Ho Yuen-yan; Jacqueline Siu
2026 Aichi-Nagoya	China; Zhanzhao Gu; Jiayi Rao; Yue Wu; Jiayi Yu	South Korea; Hyunwoo Do; Shiwoo Kim; Myeongseok Lee; Dongheon Nam	Japan; Shingo Hayashi; Ryuma Hieda; Fumiyasu Nishiwaki; Akiko Yonemoto

=== Individual endurance ===
Games	Gold	Silver	Bronze
2006 Doha	Rashid Al-Maktoum (UAE)	Nasser Al-Khalifa (BRN)	Sultan Bin Sulayem (UAE)

=== Team endurance ===
Games	Gold	Silver	Bronze
2006 Doha	United Arab Emirates (UAE); Rashid Al-Maktoum; Hamdan Al-Maktoum; Ahmed Al-Maktoum; Majid Al-Maktoum	Bahrain (BRN); Ahmed Hamad Al-Rowaiei; Duaij Al-Khalifa; Khalid Al-Khalifa; Nasser Al-Khalifa	Qatar (QAT); Fahad Al-Hajri; Mohammed Al-Thani; Essa Al-Mannai; Ali Al-Malki

=== Individual eventing ===
Games	Gold	Silver	Bronze
1982 New Delhi	Raghubir Singh (IND)	Ghulam Mohammed Khan (IND)	Prahlad Singh (IND)
1986 Seoul	Choi Myung-jin (KOR)	Eiki Miyazaki (JPN)	Kojiro Goto (JPN)
1998 Bangkok	Ikko Murakami (JPN)	Nagone Kamolsiri (THA)	Kiatnarong Klongkarn (THA)
2002 Busan	Pongsiree Bunluewong (THA)	Cheon Sang-yong (KOR)	Daisuke Kato (JPN)
2006 Doha	Yoshiaki Oiwa (JPN)	Abdulla Al-Ejail (QAT)	Husref Malek (MAS)
2010 Guangzhou	Kenki Sato (JPN)	Cheon Jai-sik (KOR)	Yoshiaki Oiwa (JPN)
2014 Incheon	Song Sang-wuk (KOR)	Hua Tian (CHN)	Bang Si-re (KOR)
2018 Jakarta–Palembang	Yoshiaki Oiwa (JPN)	Fouaad Mirza (IND)	Hua Tian (CHN)
2022 Hangzhou	Hua Tian (CHN)	Korntawat Samran (THA)	Kazuhiro Yoshizawa (JPN)
2026 Aichi-Nagoya	Hua Tian (CHN)	Woraphat Sittiju (THA)	Yoshiaki Oiwa (JPN)

=== Team eventing ===
Games	Gold	Silver	Bronze
1982 New Delhi	India (IND); Raghubir Singh; Ghulam Mohammed Khan; Bishal Singh; Milkha Singh	Japan (JPN); Kojiro Goto; Kazuhide Kobayashi; Hidekazu Imai; Gen Ueda	Philippines (PHI); Steven Virata; Marielle Virata; Fidelino Barba; Jose Montilla
1986 Seoul	Japan (JPN); Kojiro Goto; Shunsuke Kawamata; Eiki Miyazaki; Hisashi Wakahara	South Korea (KOR); Choi Myung-jin; Choi Young-tae; Han Tae-hyun; Park So-woon	India (IND); Ghulam Mohammed Khan; Adhiraj Singh; Raghubir Singh; Ishwar Singh
1998 Bangkok	Thailand (THA); Fuangvich Aniruth-deva; Vithai Laithomya; Nagone Kamolsiri; Mana Sonkratok	Japan (JPN); Keizo Eto; Sachiko Kodera; Shigeyuki Hosono; Ikko Murakami	India (IND); Imtiaz Anees; Amlokjit Singh; Rajesh Pattu; Palwinder Singh
2002 Busan	Japan (JPN); Daisuke Kato; Sachiko Kodera; Masaru Fuse; Shigeyuki Hosono	South Korea (KOR); Cheon Sang-yong; Kim Kyun-sub; Kim Hyung-chil; Kim Hong-chul	India (IND); Indrajit Lamba; Bhagirath Singh; Rajesh Pattu; Deep Kumar Ahlawat
2006 Doha	Qatar (QAT); Awad Al-Qahtani; Rashid Al-Marri; Ali Al-Marri; Abdulla Al-Ejail	Japan (JPN); Ikko Murakami; Shigeyuki Hosono; Yoshiaki Oiwa; Daisuke Kato	India (IND); Bhagirath Singh; Deep Kumar Ahlawat; Palwinder Singh; Rajesh Pattu
2010 Guangzhou	Japan (JPN); Yoshiaki Oiwa; Atsushi Negishi; Takayuki Yumira; Kenki Sato	Thailand (THA); Weerapat Pitakanonda; Promton Kingwan; Nina Ligon; Terri Impson	China (CHN); Li Jingmin; Liu Tongyan; Yang Hua; Liang Ruiji
2014 Incheon	South Korea (KOR); Cheon Jai-sik; Hong Won-jae; Bang Si-re; Song Sang-wuk	Japan (JPN); Tae Sato; Takanori Kusunoki; Ryuzo Kitajima; Toshiyuki Tanaka	Hong Kong (HKG); Thomas Heffernan Ho; Nicole Fardel; Annie Ho
2018 Jakarta–Palembang	Japan (JPN); Takayuki Yumira; Kenta Hiranaga; Ryuzo Kitajima; Yoshiaki Oiwa	India (IND); Rakesh Kumar; Ashish Malik; Jitender Singh; Fouaad Mirza	Thailand (THA); Fuangvich Aniruth-deva; Arinadtha Chavatanont; Preecha Khunjan; Korntawat Samran
2022 Hangzhou	China (CHN); Bao Yingfeng; Hua Tian; Liang Ruiji; Sun Huadong	Japan (JPN); Kenta Hiranaga; Shoto Kusumoto; Yusuke Nakajima; Kazuhiro Yoshizawa	Thailand (THA); Supap Khaw-Ngam; Preecha Khunjan; Weerapat Pitakanonda; Korntawat Samran
2026 Aichi-Nagoya	Thailand (THA); Supap Khaw-Ngam; Weerapat Pitakanonda; Korntawat Samran; Woraphat Sittiju	Japan (JPN); Ryo Murata; Yoshiaki Oiwa; Toshiyuki Tanaka; Kazuma Tomoto	South Korea (KOR); Hansu Kang; Hyeongho Kim; Donghwa Lee; Heungsu Park

=== Individual jumping ===
Games	Gold	Silver	Bronze
1982 New Delhi	Nadia Al-Mutawa (KUW)	Jamila Al-Mutawa (KUW)	Bariaa Al-Sabbah (KUW)
1986 Seoul	Takashi Tomura (JPN)	Shuichi Toki (JPN)	Ryuzo Okuno (JPN)
1994 Hiroshima	Konoshin Kuwahara (JPN)	Ryuzo Okuno (JPN)	Natya Chantrasmi (THA)
1998 Bangkok	Jin Kanno (JPN)	Sohn Bong-gak (KOR)	Quzier Ambak (MAS)
2002 Busan	Mikee Cojuangco-Jaworski (PHI)	Lee Jin-kyung (KOR)	Tadayoshi Hayashi (JPN)
2006 Doha	Ali Al-Rumaihi (QAT)	Jasmine Chen (TPE)	Joo Jung-hyun (KOR)
2010 Guangzhou	Ramzy Al-Duhami (KSA)	Latifa Al-Maktoum (UAE)	Khaled Al-Eid (KSA)
2014 Incheon	Abdullah Al-Sharbatly (KSA)	Satoshi Hirao (JPN)	Taizo Sugitani (JPN)
2018 Jakarta–Palembang	Ali Al-Khorafi (KUW)	Ali Al-Thani (QAT)	Ramzy Al-Duhami (KSA)
2022 Hangzhou	Abdullah Al-Sharbatly (KSA)	Omar Almarzouqi Aljneibi (UAE)	Abdullah Mohd Al Marri (UAE)

=== Team jumping ===
Games	Gold	Silver	Bronze
1986 Seoul	Japan (JPN); Yoshihiro Nakano; Ryuzo Okuno; Shuichi Toki; Takashi Tomura	Kuwait (KUW); Sami Al-Mudhaf; Tareq Shuaib; Jamila Al-Mutawa; Nadia Al-Mutawa	South Korea (KOR); Kim Seong-joong; Kim Seung-hwan; Ma Jae-woong; Moon Eun-jin
1994 Hiroshima	Japan (JPN); Yoshihiro Nakano; Ryuzo Okuno; Konoshin Kuwahara; Naoki Otani	Chinese Taipei (TPE); Chen Hui-ming; Huang Han-wen; Chou Min-kun; Su Cheng-hung	Iran (IRI); Shahrokh Moghaddam; Kazem Vojdani; Ezzatollah Vojdani; Davoud Bahrami
1998 Bangkok	Japan (JPN); Toshiki Masui; Tadayoshi Kani; Jin Kanno; Chieko Yamaguchi	South Korea (KOR); Sohn Bong-gak; Woo Jung-ho; Kim Sung-whan; Heo Jung-sung	Kuwait (KUW); Rakad Al-Dhafiri; Jamila Al-Mutawa; Hamad Al-Dabbous; Hamad Shehab
2002 Busan	Japan (JPN); Tadayoshi Hayashi; Osamu Komiyama; Kenji Morimoto; Eiji Okazaki	Philippines (PHI); Danielle Cojuangco; Mikee Cojuangco-Jaworski; Toni Leviste; Michelle Barrera	Malaysia (MAS); Qabil Ambak; Quzier Ambak; Syed Omar Al-Mohdzar; Syed Zain Al-Mohdzar
2006 Doha	Saudi Arabia (KSA); Khaled Al-Eid; Abdullah Al-Saud; Kamal Bahamdan; Abdullah Al-Sharbatly	South Korea (KOR); Song Sang-wuk; Hwang Soon-won; Park Jae-hong; Joo Jung-hyun	United Arab Emirates (UAE); Latifa Al-Maktoum; Abdullah Al-Marri; Abdullah Al-Muhairi; Mohamed Al-Kumaiti
2010 Guangzhou	Saudi Arabia (KSA); Ramzy Al-Duhami; Khaled Al-Eid; Abdullah Al-Saud; Abdullah Al-Sharbatly	United Arab Emirates (UAE); Latifa Al-Maktoum; Majid Al-Qassimi; Ahmed Al-Junaibi; Rashid Al-Maktoum	Hong Kong (HKG); Kenneth Cheng; Patrick Lam; Samantha Lam; Jacqueline Lai
2014 Incheon	Qatar (QAT); Nasser Al-Ghazali; Ali Al-Thani; Khalid Al-Emadi; Bassem Hassan Mohammed	Saudi Arabia (KSA); Faisal Al-Shalan; Abdulrahman Al-Rajhi; Salman Al-Maqadi; Abdullah Al-Sharbatly	Japan (JPN); Satoshi Hirao; Takashi Utsunomiya; Tadahiro Hayashi; Taizo Sugitani
2018 Jakarta–Palembang	Saudi Arabia (KSA); Abdullah Al-Sharbatly; Khaled Al-Eid; Khaled Al-Mobty; Ramzy Al-Duhami	Japan (JPN); Taizo Sugitani; Shota Ogomori; Toshiki Masui; Daisuke Fukushima	Qatar (QAT); Hamad Al-Attiyah; Salmen Al-Suwaidi; Ali Al-Thani; Bassem Hassan Mohammed
2022 Hangzhou	Saudi Arabia (KSA); Ramzy Al Duhami; Meshal Alhumaidi Alharbi; Abdulrahman Alrajhi; Abdullah Al-Sharbatly	Qatar (QAT); Faleh Suwead Al Ajami; Rashid Towaim Ali Al Marri; Khalifa Al Thani; Basem Mohammed	United Arab Emirates (UAE); Mohammed Ghanem Al Hajri; Omar Almarzouqi Aljneibi; Abdullah Mohd Al Marri; Salim Ahmed Al Suwaidi
2026 Aichi-Nagoya	Saudi Arabia (KSA); Saad Abdullah Al-Ajmi; Ramzy Al-Duhami; Khaled Al-Mobty; Abdulrahman Alrajhi	United Arab Emirates (UAE); Latifah Al-Maktoum; Omar Al Marzouqi; Abdullah Al Muhairi; Humaid Al Muhairi	Japan (JPN); Koki Saito; Eiken Sato; Taizo Sugitani

=== Individual tent pegging ===
Games	Gold	Silver	Bronze
1982 New Delhi	Rupinder Singh Brar (IND)	Fateh Khan (PAK)	Mukallaf Aheimar (IRQ)
