= Equestrian at the 2020 Summer Olympics – Individual eventing =

Individual eventing at the Games of the XXXII Olympiad
- Olympic equestrian eventing
- Venue: Baji Koen; Sea Forest Cross-Country Course
- Date: 30 July – 2 August 2021
- Competitors: 65 from 29 nations

Medalists
1st place, gold medalist(s)		Julia Krajewski on Amande de B'Neville	Germany
2nd place, silver medalist(s)		Tom McEwen on Toledo de Kerser	Great Britain
3rd place, bronze medalist(s)		Andrew Hoy on Vassily de Lassos	Australia

The individual eventing event at the 2020 Summer Olympics is scheduled to take place from 30 July to 2 August 2021 at the Baji Koen and Sea Forest Cross-Country Course. Like all other equestrian events, the eventing competition is open-gender, with both male and female athletes competing in the same division. 65 riders from 29 nations are expected to compete.

== Background ==
This will be the 25th appearance of the event, which has been held at every Summer Olympics since it was introduced in 1912.

The two-time reigning Olympic champion is Michael Jung of Germany; Germany has won the last three events (Hinrich Romeike in 2008 before Jung in 2012 and 2016). The reigning (2018) World Champion is Rosalind Canter of Great Britain. Jung has been named to the German team.

An Olympics.com preview of equestrian (all events) provided the following overview:

Germany has won the most gold medals in Olympic equestrian sports (26 to be exact), reflecting the country's equestrian heritage and passion for the sport. Michael Jung has dominated individual eventing at recent Games, winning gold in both London 2012 and Rio 2016. Jung was destined to carve his name into equestrian history: both his father and grandfather were well-known equestrian athletes. Sweden, France, the USA and Great Britain are among the other leading nations in equestrian sport.

== Qualification ==
A National Olympic Committee (NOC) could enter up to 3 qualified riders in the individual eventing. Quota places are allocated to the NOC, which selects the riders. There were 65 quota places available, allocated as follows:

- Teams (45 places): Each NOC that qualified in the team eventing event entered the 3 riders from the team in the individual eventing. (This included the host nation guarantee.)
- Ranking (20 places): The top 2 riders (excluding NOCs with qualified teams) in each of the 7 geographic regions were to receive a quota place, with 6 final quota places based on rankings regardless of geographic region.

Prior to the start of the competition, three riders withdrew: Aliaksandr Faminou of Belarus (with his horse Martinie), Katrin Khoddam-Hazrati of Austria (with her horse Cosma) and Jessica Phoenix of Canada (with her horse Pavarotti).

== Competition format ==
The eventing competition features all 65 riders competing in three rounds (dressage, cross-country, and jumping) with the top 25 advancing to a second jumping round. Scores from the first three rounds are summed to determine finalists; scores from all four rounds are summed to give a final score for the finalists.

- Dressage test: A shortened dressage competition, with penalties based on the dressage score
- Cross-country test: A race over a 4.5 kilometres cross-country course. The time allotted is 8 minutes (570 metres per minute), with penalties assessed for exceeding that time. There are a maximum of 38 obstacles, with penalties assessed for faults. Staggered starts.
- Jumping test: A 600-metre show jumping course, with 11 or 12 obstacles (including double and triple jumps, with a maximum of 16 jumps total). Maximum height of obstacles is 1.25 metres. The required speed is 375 metres/minute (time limit of 1:36). Penalties are assessed for exceeding the time limit and for faults at the obstacles.
- Final jumping test: A shorter (360–500 metres) show jumping course. Maximum obstacles is 9, with maximum 12 jumps. The speed required is still 375 metres per minute. Obstacles may be slightly higher (1.30 metres).

== Schedule ==
The event takes place over four days, with two days for the dressage followed by cross-country and jumping on the next two days.

All times are Japan Standard Time (UTC+9).

Day	Date	Start	Finish	Phase
Day 7	Friday, 30 July 2021	8:00	11:10	Dressage Day 1 - Session 1
Day 7	Friday, 30 July 2021	17:30	20:55	Dressage Day 1 - Session 2
Day 8	Saturday, 31 July 2021	8:00	11:10	Dressage Day 2 - Session 3
Day 9	Sunday, 1 August 2021	8:30	11:55	Cross Country
Day 10	Monday, 2 August 2021	17:00	22:25	Jumping

== Results ==
=== Standings after dressage ===
Rank	Rider	Horse	Nationality	Dressage
1	Michael Jung	Chipmunk	Germany	21.10
2	Oliver Townend	Ballaghmor Class	Great Britain	23.60
3	Alex Huan Tian	Don Geniro	China	23.90
4	Julia Krajewski	Amande de B'Neville	Germany	25.20
5	Tim Price	Vitali	New Zealand	25.60
6	Laura Collett	London 52	Great Britain	25.80
7	Kazuma Tomoto	Vinci de la Vigne	Japan	26.10
8	Felix Vogg	Colero	Switzerland	26.70
9	Fouaad Mirza	Seigneur	India	28.00
9	Louise Romeike	Cato 60	Sweden	28.00
11	Therese Viklund	Viscera	Sweden	28.10
12	Tom McEwen	Toledo de Kerser	Great Britain	28.90
13	Christopher Six	Totem de Brecey	France	29.60
13	Andrew Hoy	Vassily de Lassos	Australia	29.60
15	Jesse Campbell	Diachello	New Zealand	30.10
16	Phillip Dutton	Z	United States	30.50
17	Jonelle Price	Grovine de Reve	New Zealand	30.70
18	Alexandre Zelenko	Carlo Grande Jr	Belarus	31.00
18	Małgorzata Cybulska	Chenaro	Poland	31.00
20	Boyd Martin	Tsetserleg	United States	31.10
21	Marcelo Tosi	Glenfly	Brazil	31.50
21	Merel Blom	The Quizmaster	Netherlands	31.50
21	Yoshiaki Oiwa	Calle 44	Japan	31.50
24	Shane Rose	Virgil	Australia	31.70
25	Kevin McNab	Don Quidam	Australia	32.10
26	Karim Laghouag	Triton Fontaine	France	32.40
27	Korntawat Samran	Bonero K	Thailand	32.50
28	Lea Siegl	Fighting Line	Austria	32.60
29	Toshiyuki Tanaka	Talma d'Allou	Japan	32.70
30	Doug Payne	Vandiver	United States	33.00
30	Janneke Boonzaaijer	Champ de Tailleur	Netherlands	33.00
32	Nicholas Touzaint	Absolut Gold	France	33.10
32	Jan Kaminski	Jard	Poland	33.10
34	Peter Flarup	Fascination	Denmark	33.70
35	Miloslav Příhoda Jr.	Ferreolus Lat	Czech Republic	33.80
36	Susanna Bordone	Imperial van de Holtakkers	Italy	33.90
37	Sandra Auffarth	Viamant du Matz	Germany	34.10
38	Sam Watson	Flamenco	Ireland	34.30
39	Bao Yingfeng	Flandia	China	34.40
40	Ludwig Svennerstal	Balham Mist	Sweden	35.00
41	Sun Huadong	Lady Chin van't Moerven Z	China	35.20
42	Colleen Loach	Qorry Blue d'Argouges	Canada	35.60
43	Rafael Losano	Fuiloda	Brazil	36.00
44	Mélody Johner	Toubleu de Rueire	Switzerland	36.10
44	Andrey Mitin	Gurza	ROC	36.10
44	Carlos Parro	Goliath	Brazil	36.10
47	Robin Godel	Jet Set	Switzerland	37.10
48	Lara de Liedekerke-Meier	Alpaga d'Arville	Belgium	37.20
49	Austin O'Connor	Colorado Blue	Ireland	38.00
50	Sarah Ennis	Woodcourt Garrison	Ireland	38.10
51	Weerapat Pitakanonda	Carnival March	Thailand	38.20
52	Vittoria Panizzon	Super Cillious	Italy	38.60
53	Victoria Scott-Legendre	Valtho des Peupliers	South Africa	39.50
54	Lauren Billys	Castle Larchfield Purdy	Puerto Rico	39.90
55	Joanna Pawlak	Fantastic Frieda	Poland	40.50
56	Nicolas Wettstein	Altier d'Aurois	Ecuador	40.90
57	Arinadtha Chavatanont	Boleybawn Prince	Thailand	42.40
58	Arianna Schivo	Quefira de l'Ormeau	Italy	42.90
59	Mikhail Nastenko	MP Imagine If	ROC	43.00
60	Miroslav Trunda	Shutterflyke	Czech Republic	46.10
61	Thomas Heffernan Ho	Tayberry	Hong Kong	46.70
62	Francisco Gaviño	Source de la Faye	Spain	47.70
	Katrin Khoddam-Hazrati	Cosma	Austria	WD

=== Standings after cross country ===
Rank	Rider	Horse	Nationality	Dressage	Cross Country	Total
1	Oliver Townend	Ballaghmor Class	Great Britain	23.60	0.00	23.60
2	Julia Krajewski	Amande de B'Neville	Germany	25.20	0.40	25.60
3	Laura Collett	London 52	Great Britain	25.80	0.00	25.80
4	Tim Price	Vitali	New Zealand	25.60	1.20	26.80
5	Kazuma Tomoto	Vinci de la Vigne	Japan	26.10	1.60	27.50
6	Tom McEwen	Toledo de Kerser	Great Britain	28.90	0.00	28.90
7	Andrew Hoy	Vassily de Lassos	Australia	29.60	0.00	29.60
8	Christopher Six	Totem de Brecey	France	29.60	1.60	31.20
9	Shane Rose	Virgil	Australia	31.70	0.00	31.70
10	Michael Jung	Chipmunk	Germany	21.10	11.00	32.10
11	Karim Laghouag	Triton Fontaine	France	32.40	0.00	32.40
12	Jonelle Price	Grovine de Reve	New Zealand	30.70	2.00	32.70
13	Nicholas Touzaint	Absolut Gold	France	33.10	0.40	33.50
14	Boyd Martin	Tsetserleg	United States	31.10	3.20	34.30
15	Kevin McNab	Don Quidam	Australia	32.10	2.80	34.90
16	Lea Siegl	Fighting Line	Austria	32.60	2.40	35.00
17	Phillip Dutton	Z	United States	30.50	4.80	35.30
18	Alex Huan Tian	Don Geniro	China	23.90	12.00	35.90
19	Mélody Johner	Toubleu de Rueire	Switzerland	36.10	0.40	36.50
20	Austin O'Connor	Colorado Blue	Ireland	38.00	0.00	38.00
21	Felix Vogg	Colero	Switzerland	26.70	11.80	38.50
22	Fouaad Mirza	Seigneur	India	28.00	11.20	39.20
23	Doug Payne	Vandiver	United States	33.00	6.80	39.80
24	Marcelo Tosi	Glenfly	Brazil	31.50	8.80	40.30
25	Vittoria Panizzon	Super Cillious	Italy	38.60	3.60	42.20
26	Colleen Loach	Qorry Blue d'Argouges	Canada	35.60	7.20	42.80
27	Jesse Campbell	Diachello	New Zealand	30.10	14.40	44.50
28	Susanna Bordone	Imperial van de Holtakkers	Italy	33.90	11.00	44.90
29	Arianna Schivo	Quefira de l'Ormeau	Italy	42.90	2.80	45.70
30	Jan Kaminski	Jard	Poland	33.10	12.80	45.90
31	Sam Watson	Flamenco	Ireland	34.30	13.00	47.30
32	Sandra Auffarth	Viamant du Matz	Germany	34.10	22.40	56.50
33	Carlos Parro	Goliath	Brazil	36.10	22.80	58.90
34	Victoria Scott-Legendre	Valtho des Peupliers	South Africa	39.50	19.80	59.30
35	Toshiyuki Tanaka	Talma d'Allou	Japan	32.70	30.80	63.50
36	Miloslav Příhoda Jr.	Ferreolus Lat	Czech Republic	33.80	30.60	64.40
37	Andrey Mitin	Gurza	ROC	36.10	30.00	66.10
38	Bao Yingfeng	Flandia	China	34.40	38.00	72.50
39	Sarah Ennis	Woodcourt Garrison	Ireland	38.10	37.60	75.70
40	Sun Huadong	Lady Chin van't Moerven Z	China	35.20	42.00	77.20
41	Joanna Pawlak	Fantastic Frieda	Poland	40.50	45.20	85.70
42	Miroslav Trunda	Shutterflyke	Czech Republic	46.10	42.00	88.10
43	Nicolas Wettstein	Altier d'Aurois	Ecuador	40.90	48.40	89.30
44	Alexandre Zelenko	Carlo Grande Jr	Belarus	31.00	61.60	92.60
45	Peter Flarup	Fascination	Denmark	33.70	67.20	100.90
46	Thomas Heffernan Ho	Tayberry	Hong Kong	46.70	55.60	102.30
47	Mikhail Nastenko	MP Imagine If	ROC	43.00	76.40	119.40
48	Francisco Gaviño	Source de la Faye	Spain	47.70	75.60	123.30
-	Lara de Liedekerke-Meier	Alpaga d'Arville	Belgium	37.20	Withdrew	
-	Ludvig Svennerstål	Balham Mist	Sweden	35.00	Withdrew	
-	Rafael Losano	Fuiloda	Brazil	36.00	Retired	
-	Robin Godel	Jet Set	Switzerland	37.10	Retired	
-	Małgorzata Cybulska	Chenaro	Poland	31.00	Eliminated	
-	Janneke Boonzaaijer	Champ de Tailleur	Netherlands	33.00	Eliminated	
-	Louise Romeike	Cato 60	Sweden	28.00	Eliminated	
-	Therese Viklund	Viscera	Sweden	28.10	Eliminated	
-	Yoshiaki Oiwa	Calle 44	Japan	31.50	Eliminated	
-	Merel Blom	The Quizmaster	Netherlands	31.50	Eliminated	
-	Korntawat Samran	Bonero K	Thailand	32.50	Eliminated	
-	Weerapat Pitakanonda	Carnival March	Thailand	38.20	Eliminated	
-	Lauren Billys	Castle Larchfield Purdy	Puerto Rico	39.90	Eliminated	
-	Arinadtha Chavatanont	Boleybawn Prince	Thailand	42.40	Eliminated	

=== Standings after jumping (round 1) ===
Top 25 qualify for the final with a maximum of 3 riders per Nation (NOC).

Rank	Rider	Horse	Nationality	Dressage	Cross Country	Jumping 1	Total
1	Julia Krajewski	Amande de B'Neville	Germany	25.20	0.40	0.00	25.60
2	Oliver Townend	Ballaghmor Class	Great Britain	23.60	0.00	4.00	27.60
3	Tom McEwen	Toledo de Kerser	Great Britain	28.90	0.00	0.00	28.90
4	Andrew Hoy	Vassily de Lassos	Australia	29.60	0.00	0.00	29.60
5	Laura Collett	London 52	Great Britain	25.80	0.00	4.00	29.80
6	Christopher Six	Totem de Brecey	France	29.60	1.60	0.00	31.20
7	Kazuma Tomoto	Vinci de la Vigne	Japan	26.10	1.60	4.00	31.50
8	Michael Jung	Chipmunk	Germany	21.10	11.00	0.00	32.10
9	Jonelle Price	Grovine de Reve	New Zealand	30.70	2.00	0.00	32.70
10	Nicholas Touzaint	Absolut Gold	France	33.10	0.40	0.40	33.90
11	Kevin McNab	Don Quidam	Australia	32.10	2.80	0.00	34.90
12	Shane Rose	Virgil	Australia	31.70	0.00	4.00	35.70
13	Karim Laghouag	Triton Fontaine	France	32.40	0.00	4.00	36.40
14	Mélody Johner	Toubleu de Rueire	Switzerland	36.10	0.40	0.00	36.50
15	Boyd Martin	Tsetserleg	United States	31.10	3.20	4.40	38.70
16	Tim Price	Vitali	New Zealand	25.60	1.20	12.00	38.80
17	Lea Siegl	Fighting Line	Austria	32.60	2.40	4.00	39.00
18	Austin O'Connor	Colorado Blue	Ireland	38.00	0.00	4.00	42.00
19	Phillip Dutton	Z	United States	30.50	4.80	8.00	43.30
20	Doug Payne	Vandiver	United States	33.00	6.80	4.00	43.80
21	Alex Huan Tian	Don Geniro	China	23.90	12.00	8.80	44.70
22	Jesse Campbell	Diachello	New Zealand	30.10	14.40	0.40	44.90
22	Susanna Bordone	Imperial van de Holtakkers	Italy	33.90	11.00	0.00	44.90
24	Felix Vogg	Colero	Switzerland	26.70	11.80	8.00	46.50
25	Fouaad Mirza	Seigneur	India	28.00	11.20	8.00	47.20
26	Arianna Schivo	Quefira de l'Ormeau	Italy	42.90	2.80	4.00	49.70
27	Vittoria Panizzon	Super Cillious	Italy	38.60	3.60	8.00	50.20
28	Colleen Loach	Qorry Blue d'Argouges	Canada	35.60	7.20	8.00	50.80
29	Jan Kaminski	Jard	Poland	33.10	12.80	9.20	55.10
30	Sam Watson	Flamenco	Ireland	34.30	13.00	8.00	55.30
31	Sandra Auffarth	Viamant du Matz	Germany	34.10	22.40	0.00	56.50
32	Carlos Parro	Goliath	Brazil	36.10	22.80	4.00	62.90
33	Miloslav Příhoda Jr.	Ferreolus Lat	Czech Republic	33.80	30.60	4.00	68.40
34	Toshiyuki Tanaka	Talma d'Allou	Japan	32.70	30.80	12.00	75.50
35	Bao Yingfeng	Flandia	China	34.40	38.00	5.60	78.10
36	Sarah Ennis	Woodcourt Garrison	Ireland	38.10	37.60	4.00	79.70
37	Sun Huadong	Lady Chin van't Moerven Z	China	35.20	42.00	9.60	86.80
38	Andrey Mitin	Gurza	ROC	36.10	30.00	26.00	92.10
39	Miroslav Trunda	Shutterflyke	Czech Republic	46.10	42.00	13.60	101.70
40	Peter Flarup	Fascination	Denmark	33.70	67.20	4.00	104.90
41	Nicolas Wettstein	Altier d'Aurois	Ecuador	40.90	48.40	16.00	105.30
42	Thomas Heffernan Ho	Tayberry	Hong Kong	46.70	55.60	17.20	119.50
43	Mikhail Nastenko	MP Imagine If	ROC	43.00	76.40	14.40	133.80
44	Francisco Gaviño	Source de la Faye	Spain	47.70	75.60	12.00	135.30
	Marcelo Tosi	Glenfly	Brazil	31.50	8.80	Withdrew	
	Victoria Scott-Legendre	Valtho des Peupliers	South Africa	39.50	19.80	Withdrew	
	Alexandre Zelenko	Carlo Grande Jr	Belarus	31.00	61.60	Withdrew	
	Joanna Pawlak	Fantastic Frieda	Poland	40.50	45.20	Eliminated	

=== Final results after jumping (round 2) ===
Rank	Rider	Horse	Nationality	Dressage	Cross Country	Jumping 1	Jumping 2	Total
1st place, gold medalist(s)	Julia Krajewski	Amande de B'Neville	Germany	25.20	0.40	0.00	0.40	26.00
2nd place, silver medalist(s)	Tom McEwen	Toledo de Kerser	Great Britain	28.90	0.00	0.00	0.40	29.30
3rd place, bronze medalist(s)	Andrew Hoy	Vassily de Lassos	Australia	29.60	0.00	0.00	0.00	29.60
4	Kazuma Tomoto	Vinci de la Vigne	Japan	26.10	1.60	4.00	0.40	31.90
5	Oliver Townend	Ballaghmor Class	Great Britain	23.60	0.00	4.00	4.80	32.40
6	Nicholas Touzaint	Absolut Gold	France	33.10	0.40	0.40	0.00	33.90
7	Christopher Six	Totem de Brecey	France	29.60	1.60	0.00	4.00	35.20
8	Michael Jung	Chipmunk	Germany	21.10	11.00	0.00	4.00	36.10
9	Laura Collett	London 52	Great Britain	25.80	0.00	4.00	8.00	37.80
10	Shane Rose	Virgil	Australia	31.70	0.00	4.00	4.00	39.70
11	Jonelle Price	Grovine de Reve	New Zealand	30.70	2.00	0.00	9.20	41.90
12	Karim Laghouag	Triton Fontaine	France	32.40	0.00	4.00	8.80	45.20
13	Austin O'Connor	Colorado Blue	Ireland	38.00	0.00	4.00	4.00	46.00
14	Kevin McNab	Don Quidam	Australia	32.10	2.80	0.00	12.00	46.90
15	Lea Siegl	Fighting Line	Austria	32.60	2.40	4.00	8.00	47.00
16	Doug Payne	Vandiver	United States	33.00	6.80	4.00	4.40	48.20
17	Mélody Johner	Toubleu de Rueire	Switzerland	36.10	0.40	0.00	13.20	49.70
18	Susanna Bordone	Imperial van de Holtakkers	Italy	33.90	11.00	0.00	5.60	50.50
19	Felix Vogg	Colero	Switzerland	26.70	11.80	8.00	5.20	51.70
20	Boyd Martin	Tsetserleg	United States	31.10	3.20	4.40	13.60	52.30
21	Phillip Dutton	Z	United States	30.50	4.80	8.00	10.80	54.10
22	Jesse Campbell	Diachello	New Zealand	30.10	14.40	0.40	9.60	54.50
23	Fouaad Mirza	Seigneur	India	28.00	11.20	8.00	12.40	59.60
24	Tim Price	Vitali	New Zealand	25.60	1.20	12.00	21.60	60.40
25	Alex Huan Tian	Don Geniro	China	23.90	12.00	8.80	17.60	62.30
