= Equestrian at the 2026 Asian Games – Team eventing =

Team eventing at the 2026 Asian Games
- Venue: Equestrian Park
- Dates: 22–23 September 2026
- Competitors: 30 from 8 nations

Medalists
gold medal	Thailand; Supap Khaw-Ngam, Woraphat Sittiju, Korntawat Samran, Weerapat Pitakanonda
silver medal	Japan; Toshiyuki Tanaka, Ryo Murata, Kazuma Tomoto, Yoshiaki Oiwa
bronze medal	South Korea; Kang Han-su, Lee Dong-hwa, Kim Hyeong-ho, Park Heung-su

The team eventing in equestrian at the 2026 Asian Games was held at the Equestrian Park in Tokyo, Japan, from 22 to 23 September 2026. Each team's best three scores from the three phases – dressage, jumping and cross-country – counted towards the team total.

== Schedule ==
All times are Japan Standard Time (UTC+09:00)

Date	Time	Round
Tuesday, 22 September 2026	09:15	Dressage
Tuesday, 22 September 2026	15:30	Jumping
Wednesday, 23 September 2026	10:00	Cross-country

== Results ==
Legend

- EL — Eliminated
- RT — Retired
- ~~Score~~ — Score not counting towards the team total

Rank	Team	Penalties			Total
Rank	Team	Dressage	Jumping	X-country	Total
1st place, gold medalist(s)	Thailand (THA)				109.90
	Supap Khaw-Ngam on Vinetto 3	~~35.30~~	~~12.00~~	~~46.40~~	~~93.70~~
	Woraphat Sittiju on Uster de Chanay	30.10	0.00	0.00	30.10
	Korntawat Samran on Billy Elmy	29.70	9.60	0.00	39.30
	Weerapat Pitakanonda on Carnival March	36.50	4.00	0.00	40.50
2nd place, silver medalist(s)	Japan (JPN)				115.20
	Toshiyuki Tanaka on Talma d'Allou	29.90	12.40	5.60	47.90
	Ryo Murata on Brookpark Vikenti	~~30.40~~	~~0.00~~	~~30.80~~	~~61.20~~
	Kazuma Tomoto on Fer de Lance	31.60	4.00	0.00	35.60
	Yoshiaki Oiwa on Ottawa des Desig	31.30	0.00	0.40	31.70
3rd place, bronze medalist(s)	South Korea (KOR)				143.50
	Kang Han-su on First de Montiege	~~38.30~~	~~8.00~~	EL	~~1000~~
	Lee Dong-hwa on Hot Stuff du Loir	36.60	24.00	0.00	60.60
	Kim Hyeong-ho on Emile de Chignan	32.50	4.00	2.80	39.30
	Park Heung-su on Glasgow du Loir	40.40	0.00	3.20	43.60
4	Hong Kong (HKG)				144.70
	Su Yu Xuan on Jones JL	39.30	0.80	2.00	42.10
	Nicole Michele Pearson on Hanerina SSF	~~33.20~~	~~4.40~~	RT	~~1000~~
	Patrick Lam on Highdown March	32.70	4.00	10.80	67.50
	Annie Ho on Evita AP	31.10	4.00	0.00	35.10
5	Qatar (QAT)				240.20
	Mohammed Al-Naimi on Oracle de Champenotte	37.20	0.00	11.20	48.40
	Mohammed Al-Marri on Valtho des Peupliers	37.70	12.00	20.40	70.10
	Mohammed Al-Qadi on Artus S 3	37.70	4.00	80.00	121.70
	Abdulaziz Al-Muhannadi on Degas Galotiere	~~36.20~~	~~16.00~~	EL	~~1000~~
6	Indonesia (INA)				267.30
	Marcho Alexandro on Kodaline 3	35.90	5.20	3.20	44.30
	Muhamad Zaki on Sure Gold VHP Z	~~38.60~~	~~0.00~~	EL	~~1000~~
	Fergi Tri Nur Fajar on Quincent	44.10	5.20	22.00	71.30
	Steven Menayang on Diaconthierra S	39.70	20.00	92.00	151.70
7	China (CHN)				1077.40
	Shao Han on Suez Air	34.90	10.40	5.20	50.50
	Shu Yuying on Diabolo d'Ems AA	41.90	4.40	EL	1000
	Hua Tian on Manjushri	26.90	0.00	0.00	26.90
8	India (IND)				2044.50
	Arjan Singh Nagra on Cooley Goodwood	38.20	EL	EL	1000
	Fouaad Mirza on Camouflage 38	38.70	8.00	RT	1000
	Ashish Limaye on Willy Be Dun	35.50	0.00	9.00	44.50

== External Link ==
- Reports
