= Equestrian at the 2026 Asian Games – Individual eventing =

Individual eventing at the 2026 Asian Games
- Venue: Equestrian Park
- Dates: 22–23 September 2026
- Competitors: 32 from 10 nations

Medalists
gold medal	Hua Tian	China
silver medal	Woraphat Sittiju	Thailand
bronze medal	Yoshiaki Oiwa	Japan

The individual eventing in equestrian at the 2026 Asian Games was held at the Equestrian Park in Tokyo, Japan, from 22 to 23 September 2026. The competition consisted of three phases – dressage, jumping and cross-country – with penalties accumulated across all three deciding the final ranking.

== Schedule ==
All times are Japan Standard Time (UTC+09:00)

Date	Time	Round
Tuesday, 22 September 2026	09:15	Dressage
Tuesday, 22 September 2026	15:30	Jumping
Wednesday, 23 September 2026	10:00	Cross-country

== Ground Jury ==
The Ground Jury during the 2026 Asian Games was nominated as follows;

Ground jury panel for the Eventing:

- (Finland) Seppo Laine (Ground Jury President)
- (Japan) Keiko Kabashima (Ground Jury Member)
- (Republic of Ireland) Marie Hennessy (Ground Jury Member)

== Results ==
Legend

- EL — Eliminated
- RT — Retired

Rank	Athlete	Horse	Dressage	Jumping			Cross-country			Total
Rank	Athlete	Horse	Dressage	Jump	Time	Total	Jump	Time	Total	Total
1st place, gold medalist(s)	Hua Tian (CHN)	Manjushri	26.90	0.00	0.00	26.90	0.00	0.00	26.90	26.90
2nd place, silver medalist(s)	Woraphat Sittiju (THA)	Uster de Chanay	30.10	0.00	0.00	30.10	0.00	0.00	30.10	30.10
3rd place, bronze medalist(s)	Yoshiaki Oiwa (JPN)	Ottawa des Desig	31.30	0.00	0.00	31.30	0.00	0.40	31.70	31.70
4	Annie Ho (HKG)	Evita AP	31.10	4.00	0.00	35.10	0.00	0.00	35.10	35.10
5	Kazuma Tomoto (JPN)	Fer de Lance	31.60	4.00	0.00	35.60	0.00	0.00	35.60	35.60
6	Korntawat Samran (THA)	Billy Elmy	29.70	8.00	1.60	39.30	0.00	0.00	39.30	39.30
7	Kim Hyeong-ho (KOR)	Emile de Chignan	32.50	4.00	0.00	36.50	0.00	2.80	39.30	39.30
8	Weerapat Pitakanonda (THA)	Carnival March	36.50	4.00	0.00	40.50	0.00	0.00	40.50	40.50
9	Su Yu Xuan (HKG)	Jones JL	39.30	0.00	0.80	40.10	0.00	2.00	42.10	42.10
10	Park Heung-su (KOR)	Glasgow du Loir	40.40	0.00	0.00	40.40	0.00	3.20	43.60	43.60
11	Marcho Alexandro (INA)	Kodaline 3	35.90	4.00	1.20	41.10	0.00	3.20	44.30	44.30
12	Ashish Limaye (IND)	Willy Be Dun	35.50	0.00	0.00	35.50	9.00	0.00	44.50	44.50
13	Toshiyuki Tanaka (JPN)	Talma d'Allou	29.90	12.00	0.40	42.30	0.00	5.60	47.90	47.90
14	Mohammed Al-Naimi (QAT)	Oracle de Champenotte	37.20	0.00	0.00	37.20	0.00	11.20	48.40	48.40
15	Shao Han (CHN)	Suez Air	34.90	8.00	2.40	45.30	0.00	5.20	50.50	50.50
16	Usman Khan (PAK)	Eden du Veret	36.70	8.00	0.00	44.70	0.00	11.20	55.90	55.90
17	Lee Dong-hwa (KOR)	Hot Stuff du Loir	36.60	24.00	0.00	60.60	0.00	0.00	60.60	60.60
18	Ryo Murata (JPN)	Brookpark Vikenti	30.40	0.00	0.00	30.40	20.00	10.80	61.20	61.20
19	Patrick Lam (HKG)	Highdown March	32.70	4.00	0.00	36.70	20.00	10.80	67.50	67.50
20	Mohammed Al-Marri (QAT)	Valtho des Peupliers	37.70	12.00	0.00	49.70	0.00	20.40	70.10	70.10
21	Fergi Tri Nur Fajar (INA)	Quincent	44.10	4.00	1.20	49.30	20.00	2.00	71.30	71.30
22	Supap Khaw-Ngam (THA)	Vinetto 3	35.30	12.00	0.00	47.30	20.00	26.40	93.70	93.70
23	Mohammed Al-Qadi (QAT)	Artus S 3	37.70	4.00	0.00	41.70	60.00	20.00	121.70	121.70
24	Steven Menayang (INA)	Diaconthierra S	39.70	20.00	0.00	59.70	60.00	32.00	151.70	151.70
—	Nicole Michele Pearson (HKG)	Hanerina SSF	33.20	4.00	0.40	37.60	RT			
—	Fouaad Mirza (IND)	Camouflage 38	38.70	8.00	0.00	46.70	RT			
—	Muhamad Zaki (INA)	Sure Gold VHP Z	38.60	0.00	0.00	38.60	EL			
—	Shu Yuying (CHN)	Diabolo d'Ems AA	41.90	4.00	0.40	46.30	EL			
—	Kang Han-su (KOR)	First de Montiege	38.30	8.00	0.00	46.30	EL			
—	Faris Shalan (JOR)	Koh-I-Noor des Terdrix	43.70	8.00	0.40	52.10	EL			
—	Abdulaziz Al-Muhannadi (QAT)	Degas Galotiere	36.20	16.00	0.00	52.20	EL			
—	Arjan Singh Nagra (IND)	Cooley Goodwood	38.20	EL						

== External Link ==
- Reports
