= Times of India Sports Awards =

Indian sports award ceremony

TOISA
- Awarded for: Excellence in Sports
- Country: India
- Presented by: The Times of India

History
- First award: 2015
- Editions: 8
- Most recent: 2025 edition
- Next ceremony: 2026 edition
- Website: Times of India Sports Awards

Times of India Sports Awards, also known as TOISA, are annual sports awards given by The Times of India to Indian athletes. The aim is to celebrate excellence achieved by the players in sports. The first edition of the awards ceremony was hosted in 2015.

== Editions ==
Year	Edition	Hosts	Ref(s)
2015	1st Times of India Sports Awards		
2017	2nd Times of India Sports Awards		
2018	3rd Times of India Sports Awards		
2019	4th Times of India Sports Awards		
2021	5th Times of India Sports Awards		
2023	6th Times of India Sports Awards	Mandira Bedi	
2024	7th Times of India Sports Awards	Aparshakti Khurana	
2025	8th Times of India Sports Awards	Angad Bedi; Neha Dhupia; Aparshakti Khurana	

== 2015 ==
- Milkha Singh: Received the prestigious Lifetime Achievement Award.
- Jitu Rai: Crowned the Sportsperson of the Year (Jury's Choice) for his exceptional shooting achievements.
- Pankaj Advani: Won the Sportsperson of the Year (People's Choice) award in cue sports.
- Saina Nehwal: Honored with the Youth Icon Award in badminton.
- PV Sindhu: Recognized for her outstanding performance in badminton.
- MC Mary Kom: Acknowledged via Jury's Choice in boxing.
- Sreejesh Ravindran: Jury's Choice in Hockey.
- Laishram Sarita Devi: Jury's Choice in Boxing.
- Sania Mirza: Jury's Choice in Tennis.
- Virat Kohli: Jury's Choice in Cricket.
- Yogeshwar Dutt: Jury's Choice in Wrestling.
- Parupalli Kashyap: People's Choice in Badminton.

== 2017 ==
- P.V. Sindhu: Won the prestigious Sportsperson of the Year award alongside the Best Badminton Player (Jury choice) award after her stellar silver-medal win at the Rio Olympics.
- Ajit Pal Singh: Honored with the Lifetime Achievement Award for his legendary contributions to Indian hockey.
- R. Ashwin: Won the Best Player for Cricket award.
- Virat Kohli: Won the Cricket People's Choice Award, accepted on his behalf by BCCI CEO Rahul Johri.
- Kidambi Srikanth: Bagged the Best Badminton Player in the People's Choice category.
- Jeje Lalpekhlua: Named the Footballer of the Year, beating out Sunil Chhetri.
- Dipa Karmakar: Awarded Gymnast of the Year.
- Bisheshwar Nandi: Won Coach of the Year for guiding Dipa Karmakar.
- Harika Dronavalli: Recognized as Chess Player of the Year.

== 2018 ==
- Sportsperson of the Year: Kidambi Srikanth
- Mentor of the Year: Pullela Gopichand
- Cricketer of the Year (Male): Jasprit Bumrah
- Cricketer of the Year (Female): Harmanpreet Kaur
- Badminton Player of the Year: Kidambi Srikanth (Male )& PV Sindhu (Female)
- Hockey Player of the Year: Harmanpreet Singh (Male )& Savita Punia (Female)
- Billiards/Snooker Player of the Year: Pankaj Advani

== 2019 ==
- Sportsperson of the Year: PV Sindhu (Badminton)
- Icon of the Century: Balbir Singh Sr. (Hockey)
- Lifetime Achievement Award: Bhaichung Bhutia (Football)
- Coach of the Year: Jaspal Rana (Shooting)
- Change Agent of the Year: State of Odisha
- Boxer of the Year (Joint Winners): Amit Panghal and Lovlina Borgohain

== 2021 ==
- Neeraj Chopra: Named Sportsperson of the Year and male Athlete of the Year (Track and Field) for his historic Olympic gold medal in javelin throw.
- Avani Lekhara: Won Para Sportsperson of the Year and Para Shooter of the Year after winning gold and bronze medals at the Tokyo Paralympics.
- Indian Men's Hockey Team: Won Team of the Year for ending a 41-year wait to win an Olympic medal in hockey.
- Jasprit Bumrah & Smriti Mandhana: Named Cricketers of the Year.
- Sunil Chhetri & Manisha Kalyan: Named Footballers of the Year.
- Bishan Singh Bedi: Awarded the Lifetime Achievement Award for his legendary contribution to cricket. *Annu Rani: Female Athlete of the Year (Track and Field)
- Saurabh Chaudhary: Shooter of the Year.
- Atanu Das & Jyoti Surekha Vennam: Archers of the Year.

== 2023 ==
Sportsperson of the Year

- Neeraj Chopra
- Virat Kohli
- Chirag Shetty
- Satwiksairaj Rankireddy
- Praggnanandhaa Rameshbabu

Para Sportsperson of the Year

- Sumit Antil
- Sheetal Devi
- Pramod Bhagat
- Kumar Nitesh
- Rakesh Kumar
- Prachi Yadav
- Praveen Kumar

Emerging Sportsperson of the Year

- Aditi Swami
- Esha Singh
- Anahat Singh
- Sheetal Devi

Team of the Year

- Men's 4x400m relay team
- India men's national cricket team
- India women's national cricket team
- India men's national field hockey team

Coach of the Year

- Deepali Deshpande
- Samarjeet Singh Malhi
- Ramachandran Ramesh

Archery

- Archer of the Year Male
  - Ojas Deotale
- Archer of the Year Female
  - Jyothi Surekha Vennam
- Para Archer of the Year Male
  - Rakesh Kumar
- Para Archer of the Year Female
  - Sheetal Devi

Athletics

- Athlete of the Year Male
  - Neeraj Chopra
- Athlete of the Year Female
  - Parul Chaudhary
- Para Athlete of the Year
  - Sachin Khilari

Badminton

- Singles Player of the Year Male
  - Prannoy H. S.
  - Lakshya Sen
- Singles Player of the Year Female
  - P. V. Sindhu
- Doubles Player of the Year Male
  - Chirag Shetty and Satwiksairaj Rankireddy
- Doubles Player of the Year Female
  - Gayatri Gopichand and Treesa Jolly
- Para Player of the Year Male
  - Kumar Nitesh
  - Tarun Dhillon
  - Sukant Kadam
- Para Player of the Year Female
  - Thulasimathi Murugesan
  - Rachana Patel
  - Nithya Sre Sivan
  - Manisha Ramadass
  - Mandeep Kaur
  - Manasi Joshi

Billiards / Snooker

- Player of the Year
  - Pankaj Advani
  - Sourav Kothari

Boxing

- Boxer of the Year Male
  - Mohammad Hussamuddin
  - Boxer of the Year Female
  - Lovlina Borgohain

Chess

- Player of the Year Male
  - Praggnanandhaa Rameshbabu
- Player of the Year Female
  - Vaishali Rameshbabu
- Para Player of the Year
  - Darpan Inani

Cricket

- Cricketer of the Year Male
  - Mohammed Shami
- Cricketer of the Year Female
  - Deepti Sharma

Equestrian

- Riders of the Year
  - Anush Agarwalla, Hriday Chheda, Divyakriti Singh, Sudipti Hajela

Football

- Footballer of the Year Male: Sunil Chhetri
- Footballer of the Year Female: Anju Tamang

Hockey

- Hockey Player of the Year Male: Hardik Singh
- Hockey Player of the Year Female: Salima Tete

Kabaddi

- Kabaddi Player of the Year Male: Pawan Sehrawat
- Kabaddi Player of the Year Male: Ritu Negi

Shooting

- Shooter of the Year Male: Rudrankksh Patil
- Shooter of the Year Female: Sift Kaur Samra
- Para Shooter of the Year Male: Rudransh Khandelwal
- Para Shooter of the Year Female: Avani Lekhara

Squash

- Squash Player of the Year Male: Saurav Ghosal
- Squash Player of the Year Female: Dipika Pallikal

Table Tennis

- Table Tennis Players of the Year: Ayhika Mukherjee and Sutirtha Mukherjee
- Para Table Tennis Player of the Year: Bhavinaben Patel

Tennis

- Tennis Player of the Year Male: Rohan Bopanna
- Tennis Player of the Year Male: Rutuja Bhosale

Wrestling

- Wrestler of the Year Male: Sunil Kumar
- Wrestler of the Year Female: Antim Panghal

Others

- Para Canoeist of the Year: Prachi Yadav
- Para Judoka of the Year: Kapil Parmar
- Para Powerlifter of the Year: Zainab Khatoon
- Rowers of the Year: Ashish Kumar, Bheem Singh, Jaswinder Singh, Punit Kumar
- Sailor of the Year: Neha Thakur

Lifetime Achievement Award

- PT Usha

Federation of the Year

- National Rifle Association of India

Changemaker of the Year

- Uttar Pradesh

== 2024 ==
Sportsperson of the Year

- Manu Bhaker
- Gukesh Dommaraju
- Neeraj Chopra
- Jasprit Bumrah

== 2025 ==
Sportsperson of the year (Male)

- Samrat Rana

Sportsperson of the year (Female)

- Smriti Mandhana

Cricketer of the year (Male)

- Shubman Gill

Cricketer of the year (Female)

- Deepti Sharma

Life time achievement award

- Mithali Raj

== See also ==
- Sport in India
- Times of India Film Awards
