= Equestrian at the 2026 Asian Games – Individual dressage =

Individual dressage at the 2026 Asian Games
- Venue: Equestrian Park
- Dates: 25–27 September 2026
- Competitors: 45 from 16 nations

Medalists
gold medal	Nam Dong-heon	South Korea
silver medal	Yu Jiayi	China
bronze medal	Rao Jiayi	China

Template:Equestrian at the 2026 Asian Games

The individual dressage in equestrian at the 2026 Asian Games was held at the Equestrian Park in Tokyo, Japan, from 25 to 27 September 2026. Only the best two combinations per NOC from the two qualifiers were allowed to compete in the individual freestyle final.

== Schedule ==
All times are Japan Standard Time (UTC+09:00)

Date	Time	Round
Friday, 25 September 2026	09:30	1st Qualifier
Saturday, 26 September 2026	09:30	2nd Qualifier
Sunday, 27 September 2026	09:30	Freestyle final

== Results ==
Legend

- EL — Eliminated
- RT — Retired

Ranking	Rider	Horse	1st Qualifier	Rank	2nd Qualifier	Rank	Total	Freestyle
1st place, gold medalist(s)	Nam Dong-heon (KOR)	Leonidas	70.559	1	68.147	7	138.706	75.190
2nd place, silver medalist(s)	Yu Jiayi (CHN)	Jackpoint	70.265	2	71.853	1	142.118	75.050
3rd place, bronze medalist(s)	Rao Jiayi (CHN)	Geniaal	69.618	4	70.000	2	139.618	74.935
4	Aleksandra Maksakova (PLE)	So Secret	69.882	3	68.323	6	138.205	74.430
5	Yeh Hsiu-hua (TPE)	Lorava	68.383	7	68.765	4	137.148	73.600
6	Nynn Puttisombat (THA)	Rock That Tango	68.500	6	69.324	3	137.824	73.570
7	Shingo Hayashi (JPN)	King Leatherdale O	69.294	5	68.618	5	137.912	73.030
8	Hriday Chheda (IND)	Dono di Maggio	67.353	14	67.706	10	135.059	72.680
9	Jai Sud (IND)	Goofy La Perle	66.559	20	67.000	13	133.559	71.490
10	Lee Myeong-seok (KOR)	Rossetti	67.971	10	67.971	8	135.942	71.335
11	Ryuma Hieda (JPN)	Vagabund 131	67.529	13	67.765	9	135.294	71.020
12	Bianca Schutz (UAE)	Le Grand Ayden HB	66.647	=18	66.059	16	132.706	70.930
13	Ali Aljahouri (UAE)	Lotus-S	67.030	16	65.706	18	132.736	68.945
14	Audirania Amanda Putri (INA)	For Future	65.971	24	67.176	12	133.147	68.740
15	Li Kendra (HKG)	Zinq Ferati FH	67.794	11	65.647	19	133.441	67.060
16	Gu Zhanzhao (CHN)	Shakespeare 82	68.265	8	67.471	11	135.736	
17	Wu Yue (CHN)	Iggy Pop Bek	67.735	12	66.912	14	134.647	
18	Fumiyasu Nishiwaki (JPN)	Fuerst William	67.294	15	65.000	20	132.294	
19	Jassim Alkuwari (QAT)	Jack Sparrow	65.559	26	66.382	15	131.941	
20	Do Hyun-woo (KOR)	Nina Ricci MP	66.735	17	64.706	22	131.441	
21	Saminta Al-Saifi (KSA)	Kreyade	65.206	=29	65.970	17	131.176	
22	Chanjanok Ruecker (THA)	Vincent 186	66.000	23	64.059	25	130.059	
23	Karen Leticia Herjawan (INA)	Brefood's Fayette K	65.206	=29	64.765	21	129.971	
24	Shruti Vora (IND)	Magnanimous	68.059	9	61.882	35	129.941	
25	Saoud Al-Boinin (QAT)	Blue H. Touch Olympic L	66.412	21	63.323	27	129.735	
26	Alfaro Menayang (INA)	Fribaldi	66.059	22	62.912	31	128.971	
27	Alina Shevsova (UZB)	Nocito de Muze	64.324	32	64.559	23	128.883	
28	Akiko Yonemoto (JPN)	Bombay Saphire	66.647	=18	62.118	34	128.765	
29	Annie Ho (HKG)	Bella Rouge	64.412	31	64.088	24	128.500	
30	Shyong Tien-chi (TPE)	Dordogne DN	65.294	28	63.177	29	128.471	
31	Mohammed Alserkal (UAE)	Zen Liquidity	63.765	34	63.470	26	127.235	
32	Chen Yi-ju (TPE)	Gut W. Larry Bird	64.147	33	62.265	33	126.412	
33	Wang Yu-jun (TPE)	Cennin	62.882	36	63.235	28	126.117	
34	Marie Antonette Leviste (PHI)	Lacoste 126	61.265	38	62.559	32	123.824	
35	Aneesa Al Mahmood (BRN)	Samira O	60.676	40	63.118	30	123.794	
36	Kim Shi-woo (KOR)	Sir Hubert	62.935	35	60.255	39	123.190	
37	Natalie Lankester (UAE)	Tesla	60.824	39	61.824	36	122.648	
38	Sirivannavari (THA)	Boulevard	60.265	41	60.971	37	121.236	
39	Ahmed Al-Sharbatly (KSA)	Hawkeye	58.970	42	60.882	38	119.852	
40	Lee Cheng Ni Diani (MAS)	Sam 1108	56.677	43	59.764	40	116.441	
41	Gaurav Pundir (IND)	Milli	65.794	25	EL			
42	Megan Black (BRN)	Deinrich	65.324	27				
43	Cheng Kai Hei Yuddy (HKG)	Grappa	62.471	37	RT			
—	Dara Ninggar Prameswari (INA)	Fine Art von Bellin	EL					
—	Chalermcharn Yotviriyapanit (THA)	Sant Jordi 3	EL					

== External Link ==
- Reports
