= Equestrian at the 2022 Asian Games – Individual dressage =

Individual dressage at the 2022 Asian Games
- Venue: Tonglu Equestrian Centre
- Dates: 26–28 September 2023
- Competitors: 30 from 9 nations

The individual dressage in equestrian at the 2022 Asian Games was held at the Tonglu Equestrian Centre from 26 to 28 September 2023. Only the best two combinations per NOC from the Intermediate I individual competition were allowed to compete in the individual Intermediate I Freestyle.

== Schedule ==
All times are Western Indonesia Time (UTC+07:00)

Date	Time	Round
Tuesday, 26 September 2023	08:00	Prix St. George
Wednesday, 27 September 2023	08:00	Intermediate I
Thursday, 28 September 2023	14:00	Inter I Freestyle

== Ground Jury ==
The Ground Jury during the 2022 Asian Games was nominated as follows;

Ground jury panel for the Dressage:

- (Australia) Maria Schwennesen (Ground Jury President)
- (Germany) Knut Danzberg (Ground Jury Member)
- (France) Alban Tissot (Ground Jury Member)
- (India) Sunil Shivdas (Ground Jury Member)
- (Portugal) Carlos Lopes (Ground Jury Member)
- (Belgium) Jacques van Daele (Technical Delegate)

== Results ==
Ranking	Rider	Nation	Horse	PSG score	Rank	Inter I score	Rank	Inter I Freestyle score
1st place, gold medalist(s)	Qabil Ambak	Malaysia	Rosenstolz	69.735	4 Q	72.706	2 Q	75.780
2nd place, silver medalist(s)	Jacqueline Siu	Hong Kong	Jockey Club Huittharien	71.176	1 Q	71.794	3 Q	73.450
3rd place, bronze medalist(s)	Anush Agarwalla	India	Etro	71.088	2 Q	71.706	4 Q	73.030
4	Ryunosuke Kuroda	Japan	Bellatre D.E.S.	69.324	5 Q	70.971	5 Q	72.405
5	Supasin Kongpun	Thailand	Belcanto	66.883	15 Q	67.324	12 Q	71.670
6	Rao Jiayi	China	Geniaal	69.265	6 Q	70.853	6 Q	71.410
7	Chao Lan	China	Sergio Leone	67.441	11 Q	67.794	10 Q	71.160
8	Yeh Hsiu-hua	Chinese Taipei	Ewoud	67.088	12 Q	67.088	13 Q	69.030
9	Chisu Kim	South Korea	Bonifaz von Insel	67.530	10 Q	68.794	8 Q	67.800
10	Jassim Alkuwari	Qatar	Handretti	65.765	19 Q	64.441	16 Q	66.915
11	Chanjanok Klara Ruecker	Thailand	Vincent 186	65.647	20 Q	65.441	14 Q	66.175
12	Natalie Lankester	United Arab Emirates	Cash DXB	67.059	14 Q	64.882	15 Q	65.680
13	Annie Yuen-yan Ho	Hong Kong	Southern Cross Braemar	68.323	7 Q	68.000	9 Q	61.010
14	Maria Takada	Japan	Britania 7	67.088	12 Q	63.676	17 Q	59.965
-	Hriday Chheda	India	Chemxpro Emerald	69.941	3 Q	73.883	1 Q	EL
	Huang Zhuoqin	China	Badoit 2	68.176	8 Q	69.353	7	
	Divyakriti Singh	India	Adrenalin Firford	68.176	8 Q	67.676	11	
	Akane Kuroki	Japan	L'Esperado 2	65.912	18 Q	62.147	22	
	Yu-Chieh Chang	Chinese Taipei	Kom Ragdoll	61.412	26 Q	63.147	18	
	Bianca Schutz	United Arab Emirates	Fearless WS	60.853	27 Q	63.118	19	
	Soo Jin Lee	South Korea	Houdini	66.559	17 Q	62.529	20	
	Maryam Alboinin	Qatar	Guydo	64.823	23 Q	62.383	21	
	Samantha Grace Chan	Hong Kong	DSP Fiero	65.353	21 Q	62.000	23	
	Chun-Chieh Huang	Chinese Taipei	Captein	64.912	22 Q	60.353	24	
	H.R.H. Sirivannavari	Thailand	Es Fangar's Samba King	61.588	25 Q	59.618	25	
	Mohammed Alserkal	United Arab Emirates	Hermes-V	59.147	30 Q	59.588	26	
	Ali Khalfan Aljahouri	United Arab Emirates	Ecencka	61.912	24 Q	58.441	27	
	Zhi Xuan Alyssa Tan	Singapore	Frodo	60.176	28 Q	58.441	27	
	Saminta Mahdi H Alsaifi	Saudi Arabia	Energy	57.617	31 Q	57.706	29	
	Maryam Alsemaitt	Qatar	Copain 10	59.706	29 Q	56.735	30	
	Tara Yen Wee	Singapore	Jorito	56.676	32 Q	52.824	31	
	Sudipti Hajela	India	Chinski	66.706	16 Q	EL	-	
	Pawarisa Thongpradup	Thailand	Generaal	EL	-			
	Kim Hyeok	South Korea	Degas K	EL	-			
