= Equestrian at the 2022 Asian Games – Team eventing =

Team eventing at the 2022 Asian Games
- Venue: Tonglu Equestrian Centre
- Dates: 30 September – 2 October 2023
- Competitors: 21 from 7 nations

Medalists
| gold medal | China; Hua Tian, Liang Ruiji, Bao Yingfeng, Sun Huadong |
| silver medal | Japan; Kenta Hiranaga, Shoto Kusumoto, Yusuke Nakajima, Kazuhiro Yoshizawa |
| bronze medal | Thailand; Supap Khaw-Ngam, Preecha Khunjan, Weerapat Pitakanonda, Korntawat Samran |

The individual eventing in equestrian at the 2022 Asian Games was held at the Tonglu Equestrian Centre from 30 September to 2 October 2023.

== Schedule ==
All times are China Standard Time (UTC+08:00)

| Date | Time | Round |
|---|---|---|
| Monday, 30 September 2023 | 08:00 | Dressage |
| Tuesday, 1 October 2023 | 08:00 | Cross-country |
| Wednesday, 2 October 2023 | 09:30 | Jumping |

== Results ==
Legend

- EL — Eliminated
- WD — Withdrawn

| Rank | Team | Penalties | | | Total |
| Rank | Team | Dressage | X-country | Jumping | Total |
|---|---|---|---|---|---|
| 1st place, gold medalist(s) | China (CHN) | | | | 86.70 |
| | Liang Ruiji on Poacher's Hope | ~~28.60~~ | ~~7.20~~ | WD | ~~1000~~ |
| | Bao Yingfeng on Newmarket Ritz | 30.20 | 0.00 | 0.00 | 30.20 |
| | Sun Huadong on Lady Chin V't Moerven Z | 29.60 | 0.00 | 0.00 | 29.60 |
| | Hua Tian on Poseidon Admiral | 27.00 | 0.00 | 0.00 | 27.00 |
| 2nd place, silver medalist(s) | Japan (JPN) | | | | 92.70 |
| | Kenta Hiranaga on Duke of Sussex | ~~30.50~~ | EL | | ~~1000~~ |
| | Kazuhiro Yoshizawa on Penny Grans | 28.60 | 0.00 | 0.00 | 28.60 |
| | Yusuke Nakajima on Credit Krunch | 31.60 | 0.00 | 0.00 | 31.60 |
| | Shoto Kusumoto on Vick Du Gisors Jra | 32.50 | 0.00 | 4.00 | 32.50 |
| 3rd place, bronze medalist(s) | Thailand (THA) | | | | 93.90 |
| | Supap Khaw-Ngam on Canadian Club M | ~~32.20~~ | ~~11.00~~ | ~~0.00~~ | ~~43.20~~ |
| | Weerapat Pitakanonda on Carnival March | 31.80 | 0.00 | 0.00 | 31.80 |
| | Preecha Khunjan on Snowrunner | 34.20 | 0.00 | 00.00 | 34.20 |
| | Korntawat Samran on Billy Elmy | 27.90 | 0.00 | 0.00 | 27.90 |
| 4 | Hong Kong (HKG) | | | | 124.00 |
| | Su Yu Xuan on Spypark Ferro Xs | ~~30.20~~ | ~~30.40~~ | ~~0.00~~ | ~~60.60~~ |
| | Daniella Lin on A Sparkling Bellini | 38.60 | 0.00 | 20.40 | 59.00 |
| | Patrick Lam on Jockey Club Highdown March | 28.30 | 0.40 | 4.00 | 32.70 |
| | Annie Ho on Jockey Club Miss Matana | 28.30 | 0.00 | 4.00 | 32.30 |
| 5 | India (IND) | | | | 1077.20 |
| | Vikas Kumar on Noreway Harry | 32.40 | 8.80 | 0.00 | 41.20 |
| | Apurva Kishor Dabhade on Valtho des Peulpliers | 29.60 | 0.00 | 6.40 | 36.00 |
| | Ashish Vivek Limaye on Willy Be Dun | 26.90 | EL | | 1000 |
