= Equestrian events at the 2022 Asian Games =

- Venue: Tonglu Equestrian Centre
- Dates: 26 September – 6 October 2023
- Nations: 21

Equestrian events at the 2022 Asian Games were held between 26 September and 6 October 2023 at the Tonglu Equestrian Centre in Tonglu County, China, and consisted of three events, which included Show-Jumping, Dressage and Eventing.

== Schedule ==
●	Round	●	Last round	Q	Qualification	F	Final

Event↓/Date →	26th Tue	27th Wed	28th Thu	29th Fri	30th Sat	1st Sun	2nd Mon	3rd Tue	4th Wed		5th Thu	6th Fri
Individual dressage	Q	Q	F									
Team dressage	F											
Individual eventing					●	●	●					
Team eventing					●	●	●					
Individual jumping								Q	Q			F
Team jumping								Q	Q	F		

== Medalists ==
Event	Gold	Silver	Bronze
Individual dressage	Qabil Ambak; Malaysia	Jacqueline Siu; Hong Kong	Anush Agarwalla; India
Team dressage	India; Anush Agarwalla; Divyakirti Singh; Hriday Chheda; Sudipti Hajela	China; Huang Zhuoqin; Lan Chao; Rao Jiayi	Hong Kong; Samantha Grace Chan; Annie Ho Yuen-yan; Jacqueline Siu
Individual eventing	Hua Tian; China	Korntawat Samran; Thailand	Kazuhiro Yoshizawa; Japan
Team eventing	China; Bao Yingfeng; Hua Tian; Liang Ruiji; Sun Huadong	Japan; Kenta Hiranaga; Shoto Kusumoto; Yusuke Nakajima; Kazuhiro Yoshizawa	Thailand; Supap Khaw-Ngam; Preecha Khunjan; Weerapat Pitakanonda; Korntawat Samran
Individual jumping	Abdullah Al-Sharbatly; Saudi Arabia	Omar Al Marzouqi; United Arab Emirates	Abdullah Mohd Al Marri; United Arab Emirates
Team jumping	Saudi Arabia; Ramzy Al Duhami; Meshal Alhumaidi Alharbi; Abdulrahman Alrajhi; Abdullah Al-Sharbatly	Qatar; Faleh Suwead Al Ajami; Rashid Towaim Ali Al Marri; Khalifa Al Thani; Basem Mohammed	United Arab Emirates; Mohammed Ghanem Al Hajri; Omar Al Marzouqi; Abdullah Mohd Al Marri; Salim Ahmed Al Suwaidi

== Medal table ==
* Host nation (China)

Rank	Nation	Gold	Silver	Bronze	Total
1	China (CHN)*	2	1	0	3
2	Saudi Arabia (KSA)	2	0	0	2
3	India (IND)	1	0	1	2
4	Malaysia (MAS)	1	0	0	1
5	United Arab Emirates (UAE)	0	1	2	3
6	Hong Kong (HKG)	0	1	1	2
6	Japan (JPN)	0	1	1	2
6	Thailand (THA)	0	1	1	2
9	Qatar (QAT)	0	1	0	1
Totals (9 entries)		6	6	6	18

== Participating nations ==
Nations that competed in equestrian events at the 2022 Asian Games:

- China (11)
- Hong Kong (9)
- Indonesia (1)
- India (10)
- Iran (4)
- Japan (11)
- South Korea (9)
- Saudi Arabia (8)
- Kuwait (4)
- Malaysia (2)
- Philippines (1)
- Qatar (8)
- Singapore (4)
- Syria (2)
- Thailand (9)
- Chinese Taipei (8)
- United Arab Emirates (8)
- Uzbekistan (6)
