= Equestrian at the 2026 Asian Games – Team dressage =

Team dressage at the 2026 Asian Games
- Venue: Equestrian Park
- Dates: 25 September 2026
- Competitors: 35 from 9 nations

Medalists
gold medal	China; Gu Zhanzhao, Rao Jiayi, Wu Yue, Yu Jiayi
silver medal	South Korea; Do Hyun-woo, Kim Shi-woo, Lee Myeong-seok, Nam Dong-heon
bronze medal	Japan; Shingo Hayashi, Ryuma Hieda, Fumiyasu Nishiwaki, Akiko Yonemoto

The team dressage in equestrian at the 2026 Asian Games was held at the Equestrian Park in Tokyo, Japan, on 25 September 2026. Each team's best three scores from the Prix St-Georges counted towards the team total, with a fourth combination able to compete as a non-scoring member.

== Schedule ==
All times are Japan Standard Time (UTC+09:00)

Date	Time	Event
Friday, 25 September 2026	09:30	Team Final

== Results ==
Legend

- EL — Eliminated
- ~~Score~~ — Score not counting towards the team total

Rank	Team	% score
1st place, gold medalist(s)	China (CHN)	208.148
	Gu Zhanzhao on Shakespeare 82	68.265
	Rao Jiayi on Geniaal	69.618
	Wu Yue on Iggy Pop Bek	~~67.735~~
	Yu Jiayi on Jackpoint	70.265
2nd place, silver medalist(s)	South Korea (KOR)	205.265
	Do Hyun-woo on Nina Ricci MP	66.735
	Kim Shi-woo on Sir Hubert	~~62.935~~
	Lee Myeong-seok on Rossetti	67.971
	Nam Dong-heon on Leonidas	70.559
3rd place, bronze medalist(s)	Japan (JPN)	204.117
	Shingo Hayashi on King Leatherdale O	69.294
	Ryuma Hieda on Vagabund 131	67.529
	Fumiyasu Nishiwaki on Fuerst William	67.294
	Akiko Yonemoto on Bombay Saphire	~~66.647~~
4	India (IND)	201.971
	Gaurav Pundir on Milli	~~65.794~~
	Hriday Chheda on Dono di Maggio	67.353
	Jai Sud on Goofy La Perle	66.559
	Shruti Vora on Magnanimous	68.059
5	Chinese Taipei (TPE)	197.824
	Wang Yu-jun on Cennin	~~62.882~~
	Chen Yi-ju on Gut W. Larry Bird	64.147
	Shyong Tien-chi on Dordogne DN	65.294
	Yeh Hsiu-hua on Lorava	68.383
6	United Arab Emirates (UAE)	197.442
	Natalie Lankester on Tesla	~~60.824~~
	Mohammed Alserkal on Zen Liquidity	63.765
	Ali Aljahouri on Lotus-S	67.030
	Bianca Schutz on Le Grand Ayden HB	66.647
7	Indonesia (INA)	197.236
	Alfaro Menayang on Fribaldi	66.059
	Karen Leticia Herjawan on Brefood's Fayette K	65.206
	Dara Ninggar Prameswari on Fine Art von Bellin	~~EL~~
	Audirania Amanda Putri on For Future	65.971
8	Thailand (THA)	194.765
	Chalermcharn Yotviriyapanit on Sant Jordi 3	~~EL~~
	H.R.H. Princess Sirivannavari on Boulevard	60.265
	Chanjanok Ruecker on Vincent 186	66.000
	Nynn Puttisombat on Rock That Tango	68.500
9	Hong Kong (HKG)	194.677
	Cheng Kai Hei Yuddy on Grappa	62.471
	Li Kendra on Zinq Ferati FH	67.794
	Annie Ho on Bella Rouge	64.412

== Externel Link ==
- Reports
