= Siegl =

Siegl is a surname. Notable people with the surname include:

- Antonín Siegl (born 1880, date of death unknown), Czech sports shooter
- Dietrich Siegl (born 1954), Austrian actor
- Franz Siegl (born 1955), Austrian bobsledder
- Hans Siegl (1944–1978), international speedway rider
- Harald Siegl (born 1972), Austrian equestrian
- Horst Siegl (born 1969), Czech professional footballer
- Lea Siegl (born 1998), Austrian equestrian
- Patrik Siegl (born 1976), Czech football player
- Philipp Siegl (born 1993), Austrian football player
- Siegrun Siegl (born 1954), East German athlete
- Zev Siegl (born 1942), American keynote speaker and presenter
