= Equestrian at the 2022 Asian Games – Team dressage =

Team dressage at the 2022 Asian Games
- Venue: Tonglu Equestrian Centre
- Dates: 26 September 2023
- Competitors: 30 from 9 nations

Medalists
gold medal	India; Anush Agarwalla, Hriday Chheda, Divyakirti Singh, Sudipti Hajela
silver medal	China; Huang Zhuoqin, Lan Chao, Rao Jiayi
bronze medal	Hong Kong; Samantha Grace Chan, Annie Ho Yuen-yan, Jacqueline Siu

The team dressage in equestrian at the 2022 Asian Games was held at the Tonglu Equestrian Centre on 26 September 2023.

== Schedule ==
All times are Western Indonesia Time (UTC+07:00)

Date	Time	Event
Tuesday, 26 September 2023	08:00	Prix St-Georges

== Results ==
Legend

- EL — Eliminated

Rank	Team	% score
1st place, gold medalist(s)	India (IND)	209.205
	Anush Agarwalla on Etro	71.088
	Hriday Chheda on Chemxpro Emerald	69.941
	Divyakirti Singh on Adrenalin Firford	68.176
	Sudipti Hajela on Chinski	~~66.706~~
2nd place, silver medalist(s)	China (CHN)	204.882
	Huang Zhuoqin on Badoit 2	68.176
	Chao Lan on Sergio Leone	67.441
	Jiayi Rao on Geniaal	69.265
3rd place, bronze medalist(s)	Hong Kong (HKG)	204.852
	Samantha Grace Chan on DSP Fierro	65.353
	Annie Yuen-yan Ho on Southern Cross Braemar	68.323
	Jacqueline Siu on Jockey Club Huittharien	71.176
4	Japan (JPN)	202.324
	Ryunosuke Kuroda on Bellatre D.E.S.	69.324
	Akane Kuroki on L'Esperado 2	65.912
	Maria Takada on Britania 7	67.088
5	Thailand (THA)	194.118
	Pawarisa Thongpradup on Generaal	~~EL~~
	H.R.H.Princess Sirivannavari on Es Fangar's Samba King	61.588
	Chanjanok Klara Rueckner on Vincent 186	65.647
	Supasin Kongpun on Belcanto	66.883
6	Chinese Taipei (TPE)	193.412
	Chun-Chieh Huang on Captein	64.912
	Yu-Chieh Chang on Kom Ragdoll	61.412
	Hsiu-Hua Yeh on Ewoud	67.088
7	Qatar (QAT)	190.294
	Maryam Alsemaitt on Copain 10	59.706
	Maryam Alboinin on Guydo	64.823
	Jassim Alkuwari on Handretti	65.765
