= Jesse Campbell =

Jesse Campbell may refer to:

- Jesse Campbell (American football) (born 1969), former American football safety
- Jesse Campbell (equestrian) (1989), New Zealand eventing rider
- Jesse Campbell (singer), American R&B singer
- Jesse M. Campbell (born 1977), American horse racing jockey
