= Mikhail Nastenko =

Russian eventing rider

Personal information
- Full name: Mikhail Vladimirovich Nastenko
- Nationality: Russian
- Born: 8 August 1966 (age 59) Kyiv, Ukrainian SSR

Sport
- Country: Ukraine (until 2009); Russia (from 2009)
- Sport: Equestrian
- Club: Planernaya (Moscow)

Mikhail Vladimirovich Nastenko (Russian: Михаил Владимирович Настенко; born 8 August 1966) is a Ukrainian-born Russian eventing rider. At the 2012 Summer Olympics he competed in the Individual eventing and finished 47th riding Coolroy Piter. He returned to the Olympics in 2021, when he finished 43rd aboard MP Imagine If.

Nastenko competed at the 1998 World Equestrian Games aboard Abordasch and was placed 68th. He competed at two European Eventing Championships (in 2009 and 2011) with Fibra, and then again at the 2015 European Eventing Championships with Reistag. He finished 39th individually in 2009 and 11th with the Russian team in 2015.

Nastenko changed his sports allegiance from Ukraine to Russia in 2009.
