= Georgie Campbell =

British equestrian (1987–2024)

- Born: Georgie Strang; 7 October 1987
- Died: 26 May 2024 (aged 36); East Budleigh, England
- Occupation: Equestrian
- Spouse: Jesse Campbell (m. 2020)

Georgie Campbell (born 7 October 1987; née Strang; died 26 May 2024, aged 36) was a British eventing rider.

== Early life ==
Campbell started horse riding at an early age as her mother ran a livery yard and riding school.

== Career ==
Campbell started her equestrian career in Kent after having a number of successes with the Romney Marsh Pony Club. In 2010 she debuted at the Land Rover Burghley Horse Trials. She competed in the top levels of eventing for many years, including the five-star Badminton and Burghley events.

== Personal life ==
Campbell married fellow equestrian rider Jesse Campbell in Ramsbury, Wiltshire in December 2020. The couple previously lived in Marlborough, Wiltshire before later relocating to Little Scotney Farm, Kent, where they set up Team Campbell Eventing. Her husband is a member of the New Zealand eventing team.

== Accident and death ==
Campbell was killed when her horse fell on top of her while competing at the Bicton International Horse Trials in Devon, England on 26 May 2024.

British Eventing paid tribute to Campbell calling her an "extremely talented and accomplished rider".
