= Peter Flarup =

Danish equestrian

Personal information
- Full name: Peter Tersgov Flarup
- Discipline: Eventing
- Born: 10 April 1976 (age 50); Viborg, Denmark
- Height: 170 cm (5 ft 7 in)

Peter Tersgov Flarup (born 10 April 1976) is a Danish equestrian. He competed in the individual eventing at the 2008 Summer Olympics, the 2020 Summer Olympics, and the 2024 Summer Olympics.
