= Francisco Gaviño =

Spanish equestrian

Personal information
- Nationality: Spanish
- Born: 14 January 1997 (age 28); Seville, Spain

Sport
- Sport: Equestrian

Francisco Gaviño (born 14 January 1997) is a Spanish equestrian. He competed in the individual eventing at the 2020 Summer Olympics.
