= Miloslav Příhoda Jr. =

Czech equestrian

Personal information
- Discipline: Eventing
- Born: 23 June 1990 (age 36); Kutná Hora, Czech Republic

Miloslav Příhoda Jr. (born 23 June 1990) is a Czech equestrian. He competed in the individual eventing at the 2020 Summer Olympics and 2024 Summer Olympics.
