= Miroslav Trunda =

Czech equestrian

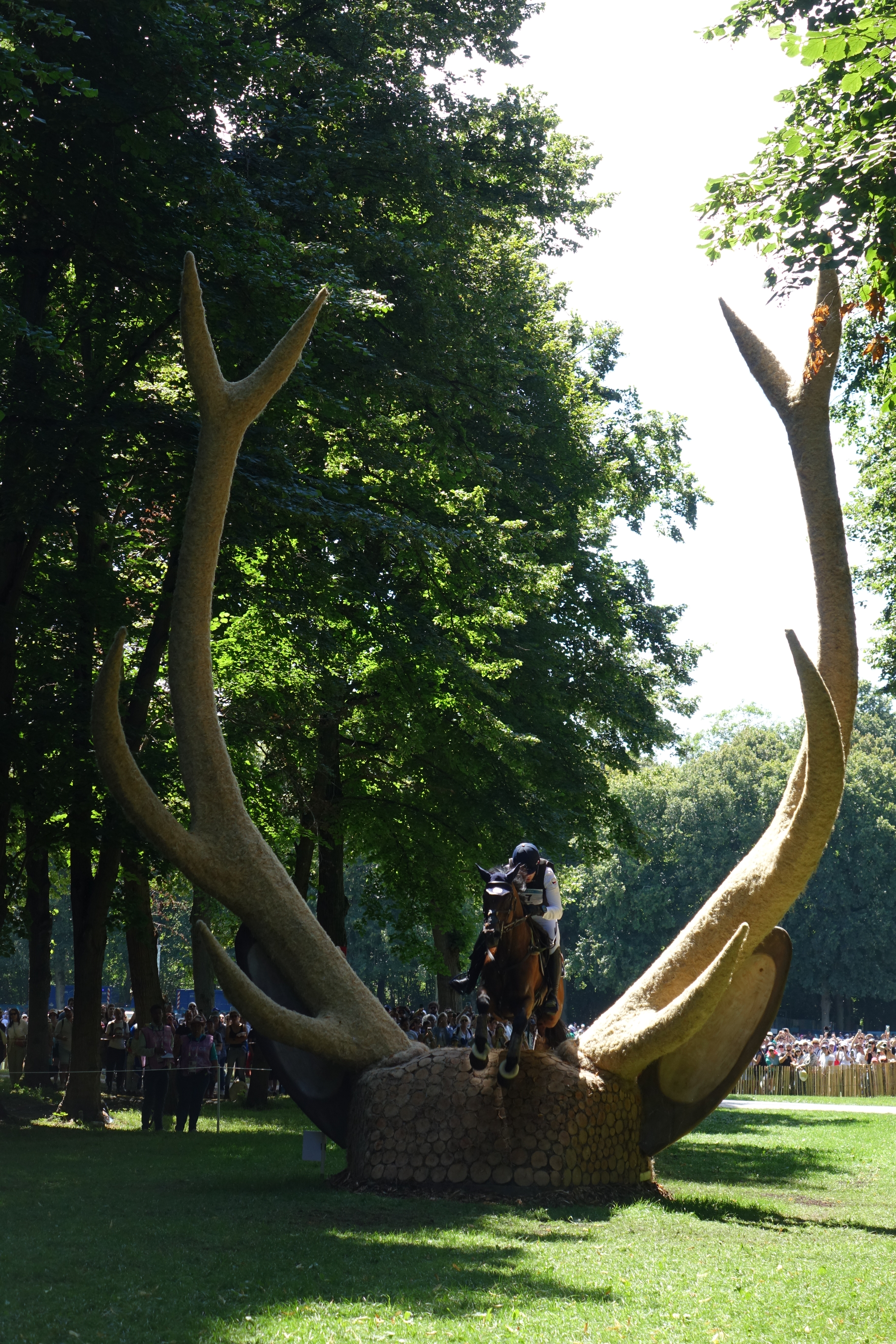
- Trunda at the 2024 Olympic Games

Personal information
- Discipline: Eventing
- Born: 3 November 1984 (age 41); Moravská Třebová, Czech Republic

Miroslav Trunda (born 3 November 1984 in Moravská Třebová, Czech Republic) is a Czech equestrian. He competed in the individual eventing at the 2020 Summer Olympics and the 2024 Summer Olympics.
