= Harald Siegl =

Austrian equestrian

Personal information
- Nationality: Austrian
- Born: 17 April 1972 (age 52); Linz, Austria

Sport
- Sport: Equestrian
- Event: Eventing

Harald Siegl (born 17 April 1972) is an Austrian equestrian. He competed in two events at the 2004 Summer Olympics.

His daughter, Lea Siegl, competed in Individual Eventing at the 2020 Summer Olympics.
