= Thomas Heffernan Ho =

Hong Kong equestrian (born 1989)

Personal information
- Nationality: Hong Konger
- Born: 28 February 1989 (age 36)

Sport
- Sport: Equestrian

Thomas Edward Heffernan Ho (Chinese: 何誕華; born 28 February 1989) is a Hong Kong equestrian. He competed in the individual eventing at the 2020 Summer Olympics.
