= Equestrian events at the 1986 Asian Games =

- Venue: Gwacheon Equestrian Park
- Dates: 23 September – 4 October 1986

Equestrian events were contested at the 1986 Asian Games in Seoul, South Korea, from 23 September to 4 October.

Japan and South Korea dominated the competition, winning all six gold medals.

== Medalists ==
Event	Gold	Silver	Bronze
Individual dressage	Suh Jung-kyun; South Korea	Hiroshi Hoketsu; Japan	Shin Chang-moo; South Korea
Team dressage	South Korea; Shin Chang-moo; Suh Jung-kyun; Suh In-kyo	Japan; Osamu Nakamata; Hiroshi Hoketsu; Naoko Sakurai	India; Jitendarjit Singh Ahluwalia; Ghulam Mohammed Khan; Raghubir Singh
Individual eventing	Choi Myung-jin; South Korea	Eiki Miyazaki; Japan	Kojiro Goto; Japan
Team eventing	Japan; Kojiro Goto; Shunsuke Kawamata; Eiki Miyazaki; Hisashi Wakahara	South Korea; Choi Myung-jin; Choi Young-tae; Han Tae-hyun; Park So-woon	India; Ghulam Mohammed Khan; Adhiraj Singh; Raghubir Singh; Ishwar Singh
Individual jumping	Takashi Tomura; Japan	Shuichi Toki; Japan	Ryuzo Okuno; Japan
Team jumping	Japan; Yoshihiro Nakano; Ryuzo Okuno; Shuichi Toki; Takashi Tomura	Kuwait; Sami Al-Mudhaf; Tareq Shuaib; Jamila Al-Mutawa; Nadia Al-Mutawa	South Korea; Kim Seong-joong; Kim Seung-hwan; Ma Jae-woong; Moon Eun-jin

== Medal table ==
Rank	Nation	Gold	Silver	Bronze	Total
1	Japan (JPN)	3	4	2	9
2	South Korea (KOR)	3	1	2	6
3	Kuwait (KUW)	0	1	0	1
4	India (IND)	0	0	2	2
Totals (4 entries)		6	6	6	18
