= Victoria Scott-Legendre =

South African equestrian

Personal information
- Born: Victoria Scott; 10 September 1988 (age 37) Pietermaritzburg, South Africa

Sport
- Country: South Africa
- Sport: Equestrian
- Event: Eventing

Victoria Scott-Legendre (born 10 September 1988 in Pietermaritzburg) is a South African eventing rider.

In 2013, Victoria Scott relocated to France from South Africa to set up a base with Rodolphe Scherer and his team at Haras des Presnes in Saint-Gervais, Vendée, France. She now runs Victoria Scott and Edouard Legendre Eventing with her husband Edouard Legendre, who has represented France at World Cup events. Scott-Legendre competed at the 2018 World Equestrian Games in Tryon, North Carolina.

In 2021, she was selected by South Africa to represent them at the delayed 2020 Summer Olympics aboard her horse Valtho des Peupliers. Competing in Tokyo, she was ranked 34th after the second phase (cross-country), but eventually withdrew before the concluding phase.
