= Sun Huadong =

Chinese equestrian

Personal information
- Discipline: Eventing
- Born: 7 January 1991 (age 35); Langfang, Hebei, China
Medal record
Equestrian
Representing China
Asian Games
Gold medal – first place	2022 Hangzhou	Team eventing

Sun Huadong (Chinese: 孙华东, born 7 January 1991) is a Chinese equestrian. He competed in the individual eventing at the 2020 Summer Olympics and at the 2024 Summer Olympics in Paris.
