= Naoko Sakurai =

Japanese equestrian

Personal information
- Nationality: Japanese
- Born: 9 December 1953 (age 72)

Sport
- Sport: Equestrian
Medal record
Equestrian
Representing Japan
Asian Games
Silver medal – second place	1986 Seoul	Team dressage

Naoko Sakurai (born 9 December 1953) is a Japanese equestrian. She competed in the individual dressage event at the 1988 Summer Olympics.
