= Choi Myeong-jin =

South Korean equestrian

Personal information
- Nationality: South Korean
- Born: 15 March 1956 (age 70)

Sport
- Sport: Equestrian
Medal record
Equestrian
Representing South Korea
Asian Games
Gold medal – first place	1986 Seoul	Individual eventing
Gold medal – first place	1998 Bangkok	Team dressage
Silver medal – second place	1986 Seoul	Team eventing
Silver medal – second place	1994 Hiroshima	Team dressage

Choi Myeong-jin (Korean: 최명진, also transliterated Choi Myung-jin, born 15 March 1956) is a South Korean equestrian. He competed at the 1988 Summer Olympics and the 1992 Summer Olympics.
