= Doug Payne =

American equestrian (born 1981)

Medal record
Equestrian
Representing the United States
Pan American Games
Gold medal – first place	2019 Lima	Team eventing

Doug Payne (born December 2, 1981) is an American equestrian.

Payne was part of the American gold medal-winning eventing team at the 2019 Pan American Championships as well as finishing fourth in the individual competition in Lima, Peru. He has been selected to compete for the United States in the delayed 2020 Summer Games in Tokyo. He was the highest placed member of Team USA.

Payne has top placings at all levels of Eventing including a national championship at the Kentucky CCI5*. In addition he has top placings in Grand Prix Dressage, CSI5* Show Jumper and success through the International Hunter Derbies.

He has been profiled in and contributed to countless national publications and media outlets. Along with Jim Wofford, Doug produced the acclaimed 'the Rider's Eye' instructional DVD. In 2014 he published 'The Problem Horse Repair Manual'.

Officially Doug held USEF Judge, Technical Delegate and USEA ICP certifications for 10 years before relinquishing due to his extensive competition schedule. He was a graduate ‘A’ pony clubber from Somerset Hills Pony Club.

Along with his wife Jessica, also a 5* event rider, they run PE3S in Rougemont, NC. Outside of horses Doug holds a Mechanical Engineering degree from Rochester Institute of Technology and is an instrument rated Pilot.

== Personal life ==
Payne was born in Morristown, New Jersey. He graduated from Voorhees High School in 2000 and has a mechanical engineering degree from Rochester Institute of Technology. Payne and his wife, Jessica, have two children, a son named Hudson and a daughter named Abby and live in Rougemont, North Carolina
