= Sam Watson (equestrian) =

Irish eventer

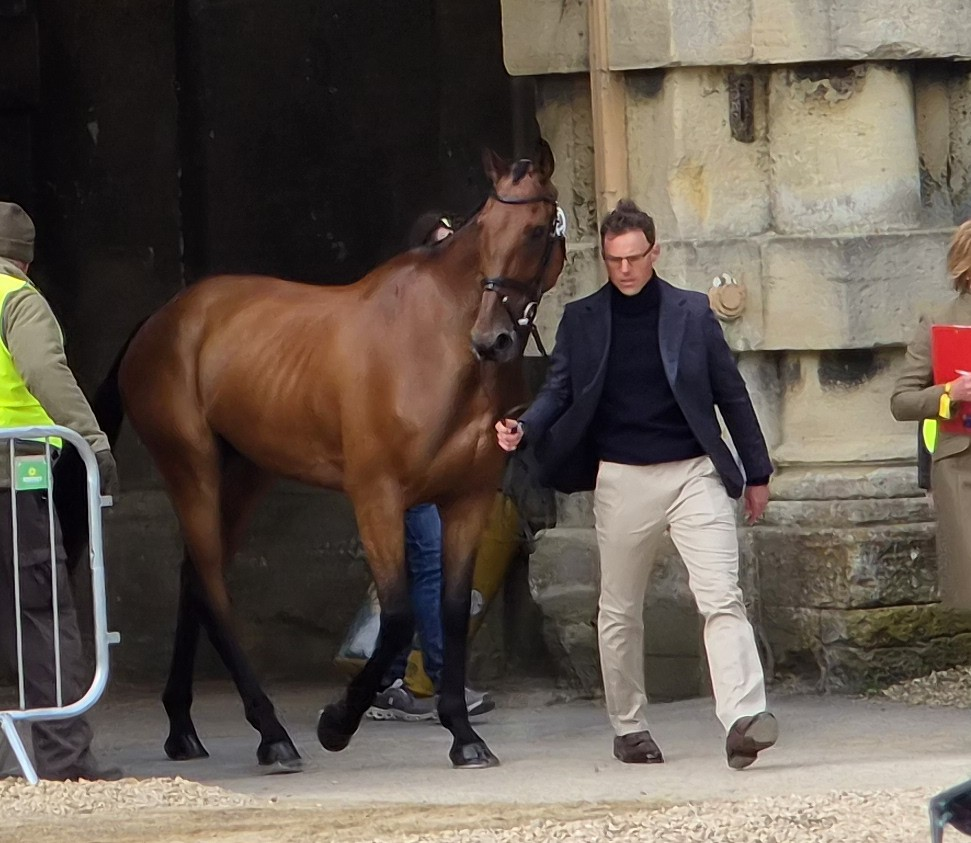
- Sam Watson and Ballyneety Rocketman, 2026 Badminton Horse Trials

Personal information
- Born: 28 December 1985 (age 40)
Medal record
Equestrian
Representing Ireland
World Championships
Silver medal – second place	2018 Tryon	Team eventing

Sam Watson (born 28 December 1985) is an Irish eventing rider. Representing Ireland, he has competed at three editions of World Equestrian Games (in 2010, 2014 and 2018). His best achievements came at the 2018 edition of the Games, held in Tryon, North Carolina, where he won a silver medal with an Irish team and placed 14th individually.

Watson has also competed at numerous European Championships. His best result at the European stage is 4th place in team eventing in 2011. Meanwhile, his best individual result is 12th place from 2015.

His father John Watson is a multiple World and European Championships medalist in eventing, as well as a Seoul 1988 Olympian.
