= Kim Seung-hwan =

South Korean equestrian (born 1960)

Personal information
- Nationality: South Korean
- Born: 15 May 1960 (age 66)

Sport
- Sport: Equestrian
Medal record
Equestrian
Representing South Korea
Asian Games
Bronze medal – third place	1986 Seoul	Team jumping

Kim Seung-hwan (Korean: 김승환, also transliterated Kim Sung-hwan, born 15 May 1960) is a South Korean equestrian. He competed at the 1988 Summer Olympics and the 1992 Summer Olympics.
