= Shuichi Toki =

Japanese equestrian (born 1964)

Personal information
- Nationality: Japanese
- Born: 10 January 1964 (age 62)

Sport
- Sport: Equestrian
Medal record
Equestrian
Representing Japan
Asian Games
| Gold medal – first place | 1986 Seoul | Team jumping |
| Silver medal – second place | 1986 Seoul | Individual jumping |

Shuichi Toki (born 10 January 1964) is a Japanese equestrian. He competed at the 1984 Summer Olympics and the 1988 Summer Olympics.
