= Yoshihiro Nakano (equestrian) =

Japanese equestrian

Personal information
- Nationality: Japanese
- Born: 2 June 1958 (age 68)

Sport
- Sport: Equestrian
Medal record
Equestrian
Representing Japan
Asian Games
Gold medal – first place	1986 Seoul	Team jumping
Gold medal – first place	1994 Hiroshima	Team jumping

Yoshihiro Nakano (born 2 June 1958) is a Japanese equestrian. He competed at the 1984 Summer Olympics, the 1988 Summer Olympics and the 1996 Summer Olympics.
