= Gen Ueda =

Japanese equestrian

Personal information
- Nationality: Japanese
- Born: 18 July 1949 (age 76)

Sport
- Sport: Equestrian
Medal record
Equestrian
Representing Japan
Asian Games
Silver medal – second place	1982 New Delhi	Team eventing

Gen Ueda (born 18 July 1949) is a Japanese equestrian. He competed in two events at the 1976 Summer Olympics.
