= Park So-un =

South Korean equestrian

Personal information
- Nationality: South Korean
- Born: 31 March 1967 (age 59)

Sport
- Sport: Equestrian
Medal record
Equestrian
Representing South Korea
Asian Games
Silver medal – second place	1986 Seoul	Team eventing

Park So-un (Korean: 박소운, also transliterated Park So-woon, born 31 March 1967) is a South Korean equestrian. He competed in two events at the 1988 Summer Olympics.
