= Takashi Tomura =

Japanese equestrian

Personal information
- Nationality: Japanese
- Born: 23 August 1958 (age 67)

Sport
- Sport: Equestrian
Medal record
Equestrian
Representing Japan
Asian Games
Gold medal – first place	1986 Seoul	Individual jumping
Gold medal – first place	1986 Seoul	Team jumping

Takashi Tomura (born 23 August 1958) is a former Japanese athlete who competed in the sport of equestrian. He competed at the 1984 Summer Olympics and the 1992 Summer Olympics.
