= Ghulam Mohammed Khan =

Indian equestrian (1946–2021)

Medal record

Equestrian

Representing India

Asian Games
Gold medal – first place	1982 New Delhi	Team eventing
Silver medal – second place	1982 New Delhi	Individual eventing
Bronze medal – third place	1986 Seoul	Team dressage
Bronze medal – third place	1986 Seoul	Team eventing

Gulam Mohammad Khan (11 July 1946 – 1 May 2021) was an Indian national equestrian. He competed in two events at the 1980 Summer Olympics. He won the gold medal at 1982 Asian Games in ‘Three Days Event’. He was honoured with an Arjuna Award in 1984. He hailed from Rajasthan state. He served in the Indian army and was decorated with VSM. Khan also served as international FEI judge in Jumping and Dressage.

Khan died on May 1, 2021, after contracting COVID-19 amid the COVID-19 pandemic in India. He was 74 years old.

His Son Riyaz Khan studied in Central School, R.K.Puram, New Delhi during 1982.
