= Kojiro Goto =

Japanese equestrian (born 1962)

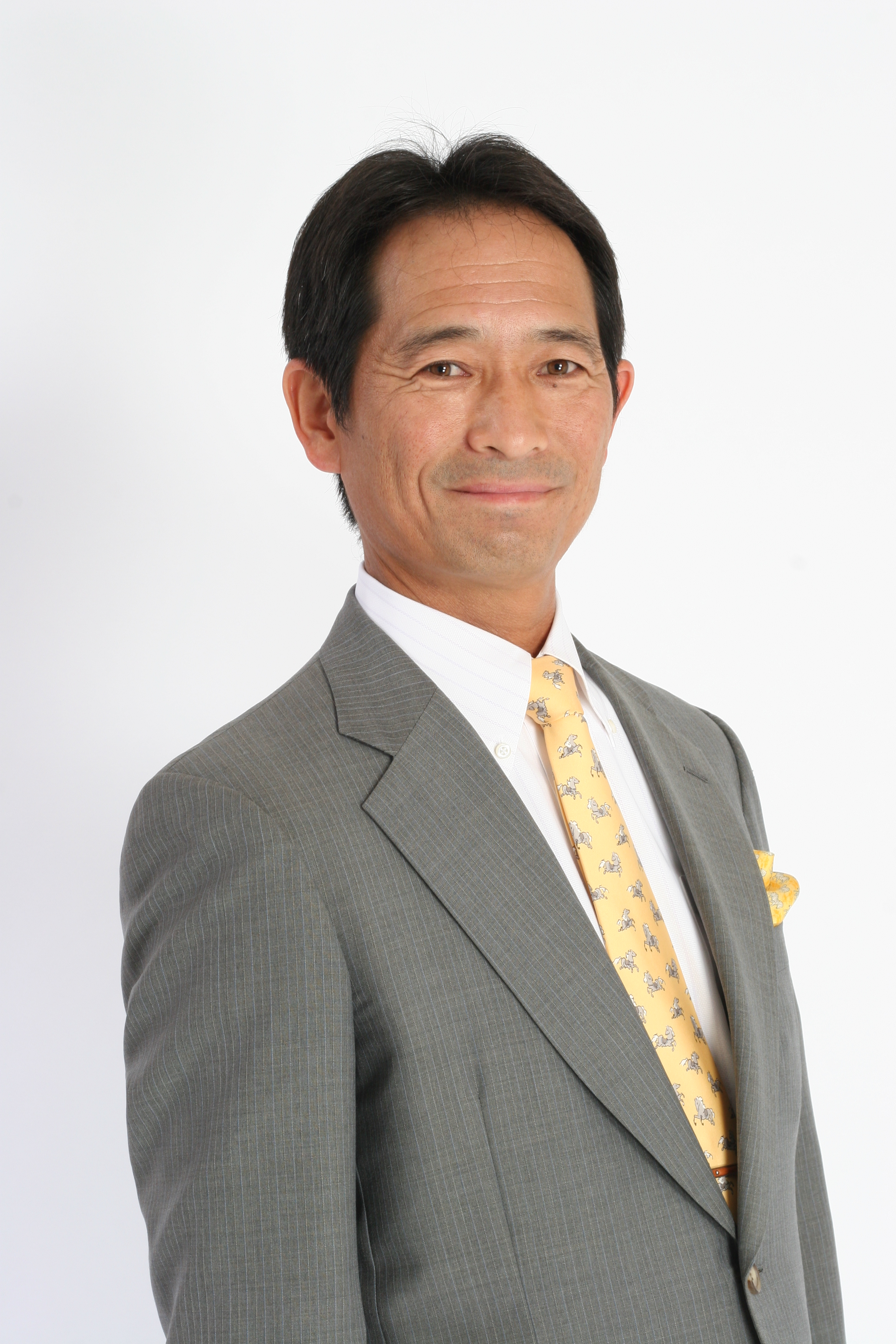
- Kojiro Goto in 2012

Personal information
- Nationality: Japanese
- Born: 24 February 1962 (age 64) Tokyo, Japan

Sport
- Sport: Equestrian
Medal record
Equestrian
Representing Japan
Asian Games
Gold medal – first place	1986 Seoul	Team eventing
Silver medal – second place	1982 New Delhi	Team eventing
Bronze medal – third place	1986 Seoul	Individual eventing

Kojiro Goto (born 24 February 1962) is a Japanese equestrian. He competed in two events at the 1992 Summer Olympics.
