= Eiki Miyazaki =

Japanese equestrian

Personal information
- Nationality: Japanese
- Born: 15 March 1955 (age 71)

Sport
- Sport: Equestrian
Medal record
Equestrian
Representing Japan
Asian Games
Gold medal – first place	1986 Seoul	Team eventing
Silver medal – second place	1986 Seoul	Individual eventing

Eiki Miyazaki (born 15 March 1955) is a Japanese equestrian. He competed at the 1988 Summer Olympics and the 1992 Summer Olympics.
