= Equestrian events at the 1982 Asian Games =

- Venue: Harbaksh Stadium
- Dates: 21–27 November 1982

Equestrian events were contested at the 1982 Asian Games at the Harbaksh Stadium, New Delhi, India between 21 and 27 November 1982. It was the first equestrian competition in the Asian Games.

The host nation India topped the medal table with three gold medals. Kuwait finished second by winning all three medals of the individual jumping event.

== Medalists ==
| Event | Gold | Silver | Bronze |
|---|---|---|---|
| Individual eventing | Raghubir Singh; India | Ghulam Mohammed Khan; India | Prahlad Singh; India |
| Team eventing | India; Raghubir Singh; Ghulam Mohammed Khan; Bishal Singh; Milkha Singh | Japan; Kojiro Goto; Kazuhide Kobayashi; Hidekazu Imai; Gen Ueda | Philippines; Steven Virata; Marielle Virata; Fidelino Barba; Jose Montilla |
| Individual jumping | Nadia Al-Mutawa; Kuwait | Jamila Al-Mutawa; Kuwait | Bariaa Al-Sabbah; Kuwait |
| Individual tent pegging | Rupinder Singh Brar; India | Fateh Khan; Pakistan | Mukallaf Aheimar; Iraq |

== Medal table ==
| Rank | Nation | Gold | Silver | Bronze | Total |
|---|---|---|---|---|---|
| 1 | India (IND) | 3 | 1 | 1 | 5 |
| 2 | Kuwait (KUW) | 1 | 1 | 1 | 3 |
| 3 | Japan (JPN) | 0 | 1 | 0 | 1 |
| 3 | Pakistan (PAK) | 0 | 1 | 0 | 1 |
| 5 | Iraq (IRQ) | 0 | 0 | 1 | 1 |
| 5 | Philippines (PHI) | 0 | 0 | 1 | 1 |
| Totals (6 entries) | | 4 | 4 | 4 | 12 |
