= Equestrian events at the 1998 Asian Games =

1998 Asian Games equestrian

- Venue: Fort Adison Riding Club
- Dates: 8–19 December 1998

Equestrian events were contested at the 1998 Asian Games in Fort Adison Riding Club, Saraburi, Thailand, from 8 to 19 December 1998. There were three equestrian disciplines: dressage, eventing and jumping. All three disciplines are further divided into individual and team contests for a total of six events.

== Medalists ==
Event	Gold	Silver	Bronze
Individual dressage	Suh Jung-kyun; South Korea	Shin Chang-moo; South Korea	Toshihide Takechi; Japan
Team dressage	South Korea; Choi Myung-jin; Suh Jung-kyun; Shin Chang-moo; Shin Soo-jin	Malaysia; Wan Zaleha Radzi; Syed Omar Al-Mohdzar; Qabil Ambak; Quzandria Nur	Thailand; Nitipat Ngao-osa; Suwat Bunlue; Chuenchom Chutima; Chalermcharn Chamswad
Individual eventing	Ikko Murakami; Japan	Nagone Kamolsiri; Thailand	Kiatnarong Klongkarn; Thailand
Team eventing	Thailand; Fuangvich Aniruth-deva; Vithai Laithomya; Nagone Kamolsiri; Mana Sonkratok	Japan; Keizo Eto; Sachiko Kodera; Shigeyuki Hosono; Ikko Murakami	India; Imtiaz Anees; Amlokjit Singh; Rajesh Pattu; Palwinder Singh
Individual jumping	Jin Kanno; Japan	Sohn Bong-gak; South Korea	Quzier Ambak; Malaysia
Team jumping	Japan; Toshiki Masui; Tadayoshi Kani; Jin Kanno; Chieko Yamaguchi	South Korea; Sohn Bong-gak; Woo Jung-ho; Kim Sung-whan; Heo Jung-sung	Kuwait; Rakad Al-Dhafiri; Jamila Al-Mutawa; Hamad Al-Dabbous; Hamad Shehab

== Medal table ==
Rank	Nation	Gold	Silver	Bronze	Total
1	Japan (JPN)	3	1	1	5
2	South Korea (KOR)	2	3	0	5
3	Thailand (THA)	1	1	2	4
4	Malaysia (MAS)	0	1	1	2
5	India (IND)	0	0	1	1
5	Kuwait (KUW)	0	0	1	1
Totals (6 entries)		6	6	6	18
