= Sarah Ennis =

Irish eventing rider

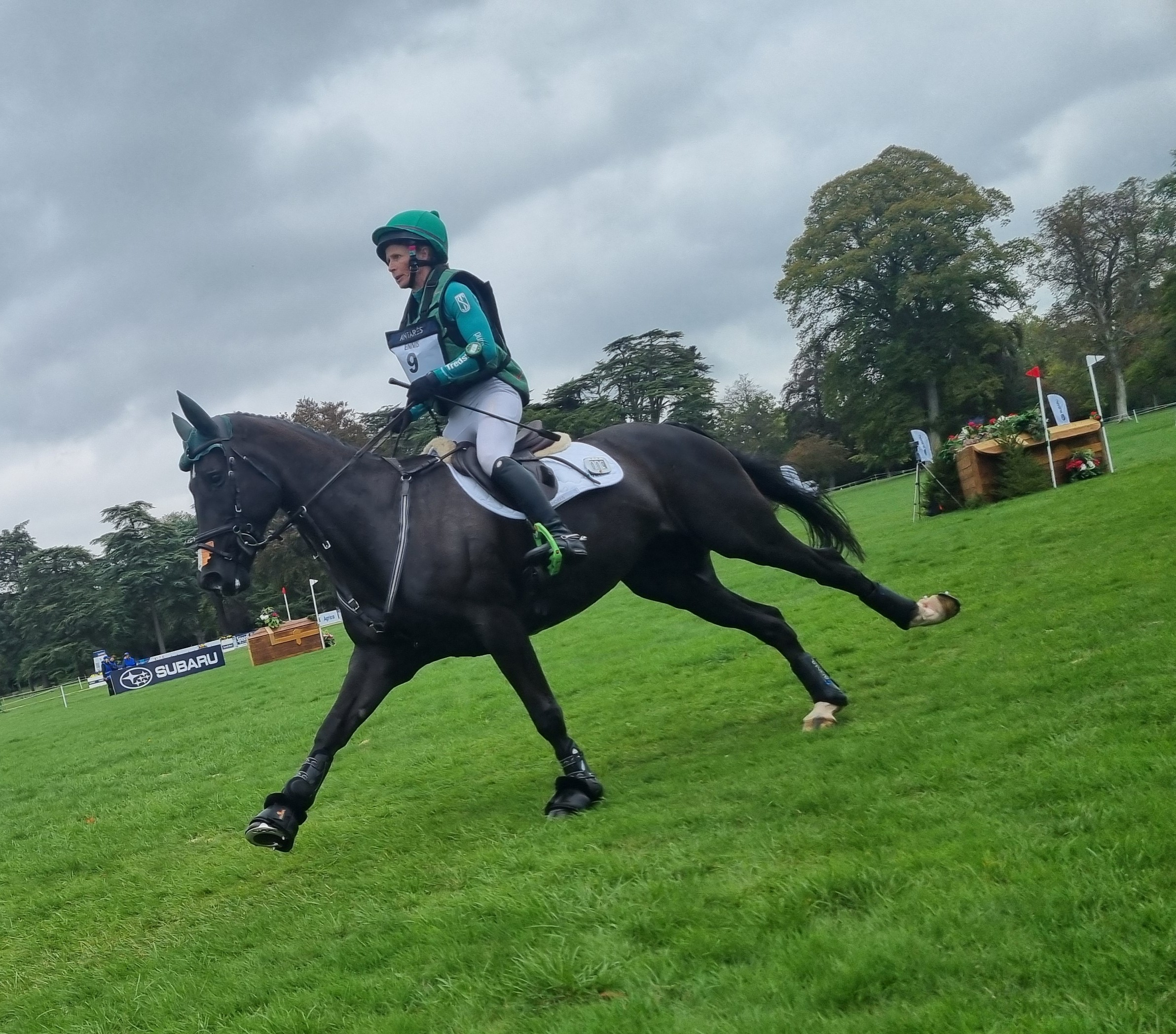
- Ennis at the 2025 European Eventing Championships

Personal information
- Born: 13 March 1975 (age 51) Dublin, Ireland

Sport
- Country: Ireland
- Sport: Equestrian
- Event: Eventing
Medal record
World Championships
Silver medal – second place	2018 Tryon	Team eventing

Sarah Ennis (born 13 March 1975) is an Irish eventing rider. Representing Ireland, she has competed at two editions of World Equestrian Games (in 2014 and 2018). Her best achievements came at the 2018 edition of the Games, held in Tryon, North Carolina, where she won a silver medal with an Irish team and placed 5th individually.

Ennis has also competed at two European Championships. Her best achievements at the European level came in 2017, when she placed 4th with an Irish team and achieved 7th place individually.

Ennis competed at the 2020 Summer Olympics in Tokyo, and was selected by the Irish equestrian federation to compete at the 2024 Summer Olympics in Paris to represent the Irish team. After cross country, Ennis withdrew Action Lady prior to the horse inspection on show jumping day.

== CCI 4* Results ==
Results
Event	Kentucky	Badminton	Luhmühlen	Burghley	Pau	Adelaide
2013		38th (Sugar Brown Babe)				
2014		EL (Sugar Brown Babe)				
2015	Did not participate					
2016		34th (BLM Diamond Delux)			20th (Horseware Stellor Rebound)	
2017		32nd (Horseware Stellor Rebound)		WD (BLM Diamond Delux)		
2018			RET (Horseware Stellor Rebound)			
EL = Eliminated; RET = Retired; WD = Withdrew
