= Hiroshi Hoketsu =

Japanese equestrian

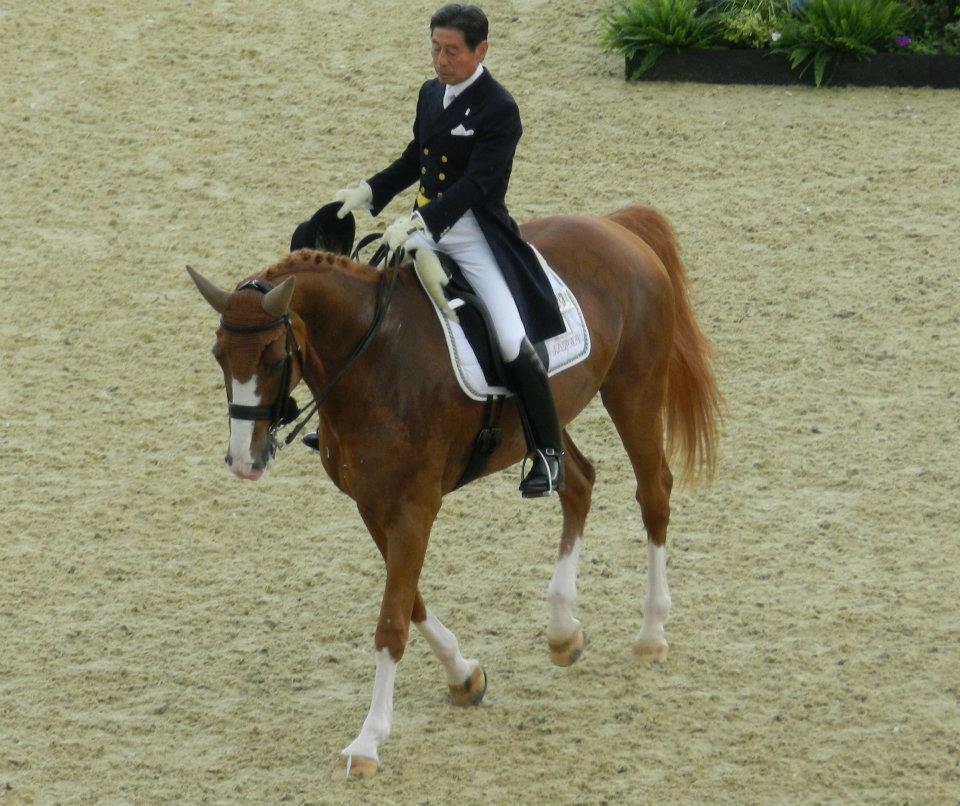
- Hiroshi Hoketsu at the 2012 London Summer Olympics at Greenwich Park
- Born: March 28, 1941 (age 85)

Hiroshi Hoketsu
Medal record

Equestrian

Representing Japan

Asian Games
Silver medal – second place	1986 Seoul	Individual dressage
Silver medal – second place	1986 Seoul	Team dressage

Hiroshi Hoketsu (法華津 寛, Hoketsu Hiroshi; born March 28, 1941) is a Japanese equestrian rider. His 44 years in between Olympics appearances is the longest ever

== Biography ==
He competed in the 1964 Summer Olympics, finishing 40th in show jumping. Hoketsu also qualified for the 1988 Summer Olympics, but was unable to compete when his horse was quarantined.

At the 2008 Summer Olympics on August 13, 2008, he finished 9th in the Dressage Team Grand Prix and 35th in the Dressage Individual Grand Prix. In 2012, at the age of 71, Hoketsu won a berth for Japanese representation for the 2012 Summer Olympics in individual dressage and in competition of equestrian at the 2012 Summer Olympics – Individual dressage he finished 40th.

In his 70s, the 1968 graduate of Duke University is regarded as the "hope for old men". He was the oldest athlete in the 2008 and 2012 Summer Olympics. Hoketsu is the oldest Olympian to ever compete for Japan, and is the third oldest Olympian to compete ever, next to shooter Oscar Swahn of Sweden, who won a silver in the 1920 Summer Olympics and Arthur von Pongracz, who competed at age 72 in Dressage in 1936 Summer Olympics in Berlin.
