= Alexander Zelenko (equestrian) =

Belarusian eventing rider

Personal information
- Full name: Alexander Zelenko
- Nationality: Belarusian
- Born: 27 July 1976 (age 49) Minsk, Belarus

Sport
- Country: Belarus
- Sport: Equestrian

Alexander Zelenko (born 27 July 1976 in Minsk) is a Belarusian eventing rider. He competed at the 2020 Tokyo Olympics aboard Carlo Grande Jr.
