= Osamu Nakamata =

Japanese equestrian

Personal information
- Nationality: Japanese
- Born: 10 October 1942 (age 83)

Sport
- Sport: Equestrian
Medal record
Equestrian
Representing Japan
Asian Games
Silver medal – second place	1986 Seoul	Team dressage

Osamu Nakamata (born 10 October 1942) is a Japanese equestrian. He competed in the individual dressage event at the 1984 Summer Olympics.
