= Equestrian events at the 1994 Asian Games =

- Venue: Hiroshima Institute of Technology
- Dates: 3–9 October 1994

Equestrian events were held at the 1994 Asian Games in Hiroshima Institute of Technology, Hiroshima, Japan, from 3 to 9 October 1994. There were two equestrian disciplines: dressage and jumping. Both disciplines were further divided into individual and team contests for a total of four events.

== Medalists ==
| Event | Gold | Silver | Bronze |
|---|---|---|---|
| Individual dressage | Mieko Yagi; Japan | Yoshitaka Serimachi; Japan | Shin Chang-moo; South Korea |
| Team dressage | Japan; Mieko Yagi; Masumi Shimoda; Yoshitaka Serimachi | South Korea; Shin Chang-moo; Suh Jung-kyun; Choi Myung-jin | Chinese Taipei; Lan Chung-hsiung; Chen Hsiang-fu; Kang Yu |
| Individual jumping | Konoshin Kuwahara; Japan | Ryuzo Okuno; Japan | Natya Chantrasmi; Thailand |
| Team jumping | Japan; Yoshihiro Nakano; Ryuzo Okuno; Konoshin Kuwahara; Naoki Otani | Chinese Taipei; Chen Hui-ming; Huang Han-wen; Chou Min-kun; Su Cheng-hung | Iran; Shahrokh Moghaddam; Kazem Vojdani; Ezzatollah Vojdani; Davoud Bahrami |

== Medal table ==
| Rank | Nation | Gold | Silver | Bronze | Total |
|---|---|---|---|---|---|
| 1 | Japan (JPN) | 4 | 2 | 0 | 6 |
| 2 | Chinese Taipei (TPE) | 0 | 1 | 1 | 2 |
| 2 | South Korea (KOR) | 0 | 1 | 1 | 2 |
| 4 | Iran (IRI) | 0 | 0 | 1 | 1 |
| 4 | Thailand (THA) | 0 | 0 | 1 | 1 |
| Totals (5 entries) | | 4 | 4 | 4 | 12 |
