= Son Bong-gak =

South Korean equestrian

Personal information
- Nationality: South Korean
- Born: 25 March 1974 (age 52)

Sport
- Sport: Equestrian
Medal record
Equestrian
Representing South Korea
Asian Games
Silver medal – second place	1998 Bangkok	Individual jumping
Silver medal – second place	1998 Bangkok	Team jumping

Son Bong-gak (born 25 March 1974) is a South Korean equestrian. He competed in two events at the 2004 Summer Olympics.
