= Mieko Yagi =

Japanese equestrian

Personal information
- Nationality: Japanese
- Born: 9 June 1950 Tokyo, Japan
- Died: 24 November 2015 (aged 65)

Sport
- Sport: Equestrian
Medal record
Equestrian
Representing Japan
Asian Games
Gold medal – first place	1994 Hiroshima	Individual dressage
Gold medal – first place	1994 Hiroshima	Team dressage

Mieko Yagi (9 June 1950 – 24 November 2015) was a Japanese equestrian. She competed in two events at the 2008 Summer Olympics.
