= Ryuzo Okuno =

Japanese equestrian

Personal information
- Nationality: Japanese
- Born: 25 October 1964 (age 61)

Sport
- Sport: Equestrian
Medal record
Equestrian
Representing Japan
Asian Games
Gold medal – first place	1986 Seoul	Team jumping
Gold medal – first place	1994 Hiroshima	Team jumping
Silver medal – second place	1994 Hiroshima	Individual jumping
Bronze medal – third place	1986 Seoul	Individual jumping

Ryuzo Okuno (born 25 October 1964) is a Japanese equestrian. He competed at the 1988 Summer Olympics and the 1992 Summer Olympics.
