= Mun Eun-jin =

South Korean equestrian

Personal information
- Nationality: South Korean
- Born: 24 December 1967 (age 58)

Sport
- Sport: Equestrian
Medal record
Equestrian
Representing South Korea
Asian Games
Bronze medal – third place	1986 Seoul	Team jumping

Mun Eun-jin (Korean: 문은진, also transliterated Moon Eun-jin; born 24 December 1967) is a South Korean equestrian. She competed at the 1988 Summer Olympics and the 1992 Summer Olympics.
