= Pankaj Advani =

Pankaj Advani may refer to:

- Pankaj Advani (billiards player) (born 1985), Indian billiards and snooker player
- Pankaj Advani (director) (1965–2010), Indian film director, editor, screenwriter, photographer, theatre director, and painter
