= Lea Siegl =

Austrian equestrian

Personal information
- Born: 19 August 1998 (age 27)

Sport
- Country: Austria
- Sport: Equestrian
- Event: Eventing

Lea Siegl (born 19 August 1998) is an Austrian equestrian. She represented Austria at the 2020 Summer Olympics and competed in Individual Eventing, riding on her horse Fighting Line. She was the youngest competitor in eventing at the Tokyo Olympics and finished 15th.

Her father, Harald Siegl, competed in Individual and Team Eventing at the 2004 Summer Olympics.
