= Raghubir Singh (equestrian) =

Indian equestrian

Medal record

Equestrian

Representing India

Asian Games
Gold medal – first place	1982 New Delhi	Individual eventing
Gold medal – first place	1982 New Delhi	Team eventing
Bronze medal – third place	1986 Seoul	Team dressage
Bronze medal – third place	1986 Seoul	Team eventing

Raghubir Singh is an Indian equestrian. He was awarded the Arjuna Award in 1982 for his achievements. He was also awarded the Padma Shri in 1983. He represented India in the Asian Games in 1982 and won a gold medal in the individual event. He hails from Jhunjhunu district in Rajasthan state in India. He served as a Dafadar in the Indian army.

He is a native of Patoda village in Jhunjhunu district of Rajasthan.
