= Seo Jeong-gyun =

South Korean equestrian

Personal information
- Nationality: South Korean
- Born: 31 December 1962 (age 63)

Sport
- Sport: Equestrian
Medal record
Equestrian
Representing South Korea
Asian Games
Gold medal – first place	1986 Seoul	Individual dressage
Gold medal – first place	1986 Seoul	Team dressage
Gold medal – first place	1998 Bangkok	Individual dressage
Gold medal – first place	1998 Bangkok	Team dressage
Gold medal – first place	2002 Busan	Team dressage
Gold medal – first place	2006 Doha	Team dressage
Silver medal – second place	1994 Hiroshima	Team dressage
Silver medal – second place	2002 Busan	Individual dressage

Seo Jeong-gyun (born 31 December 1962) is a South Korean equestrian. He competed in the individual dressage event at the 1988 Summer Olympics.
