= Hisashi Wakahara =

Japanese equestrian

Personal information
- Nationality: Japanese
- Born: 21 April 1945 (age 81)

Sport
- Sport: Equestrian
Medal record
Equestrian
Representing Japan
Asian Games
| Gold medal – first place | 1986 Seoul | Team eventing |

Hisashi Wakahara (born 21 April 1945) is a Japanese equestrian. He competed in two events at the 1988 Summer Olympics.
