= Shruti Vora =

Indian equestrian (born 1971)

Personal information
- Born: 6 January 1971 (age 55) Kolkata, West Bengal, India
- Education: Master of Business Administration; Bachelor of Commerce; EU Business School; Shri Shikshayatan College; Loreto House

Sport
- Sport: Equestrian
- Event: Dressage
Medal record
Women's dressage
Representing India
Asian Championships
Silver medal – second place	2025 Pattaya	Individual
Silver medal – second place	2025 Pattaya	Individual freestyle
Silver medal – second place	2025 Pattaya	Team

Shruti Vora (born 6 January 1971 in Kolkata) is an Indian equestrienne. She is a triple silver-medalist at the Asian Championships. Vora has represented India at the 2022 FEI World Championships, the 2014 Asian Games and the 2026 Asian Games at Japan.

== Personal life ==
Vora was born in Kolkata to Bimal and Nandini Nopany, a business Marwari family. Vora's mother rode horses and imparted her love of horses to Vora as well. Her brother Chandra Sekhar too was riding horses till his Class 12. Vora completed her primary and secondary schooling at Loreto House, received a Bachelor of Commerce from Shri Shikshayatan College in Kolkata and a Master of Business Administration from EU Business School in Geneva, Switzerland. She married Mitul Vora in 1997 and has two sons, Varun and Aryan. Vora took a 14-year break from riding after marriage; in 2009, she returned to competitive sport again.

== Career ==
Vora took up riding at the age of three, later attending the Army Riding School in Ballygunge to learn basics under Kiran and Balbir Singh. Following a 14-year break from riding after her marriage, she relocated to Europe to train. In Europe, she trained under Jitendarjit Singh Ahluwalia, before taking up dressage, inspired by German equestrian and Olympic medalist Reiner Klimke. She trained briefly under Klimke, going to Germany on the weekends while concurrently completing her MBA. She also briefly trained under another Olympic medalist, Anne Jensen-Van Olst, a Danish dressage rider, and under Patrick Le Rolland, a French dressage rider who served as coach of the French National Team in 1981 and 1984.

She represented India at the 2022 FEI World Championships (Equestrian Games) held at Herning, Denmark. Vora and Anush Agarwalla were the first Indians to compete in an individual dressage event at the Dressage World Championships, where Vora scored 64.53% astride 16-year Indian-bred Denightron. Vora qualified for the World Championship at Hagen in June 2022 and represented India (finishing 8th) at the 2014 Asian Games at Incheon.

== Tournaments ==
- 1993: Junior Dressage 1st, Delhi; Puissance: 1st, National record of 1.55 m, Delhi;
- 1994: Dressage level M: 11th, Holland; Dressage level L: 15th, Holland;
- 1996: F.E.I. International Dressage in Nizhny Novgorod: 3rd Russia; Prix. St. George: 12th, Belgian National Championships; Prix. St. George: 19th, CDI, Rennes, France;

=== 1996 to 2010: Break in the career ===
- 2010: Dressage Team Asian Games, Guangzhou, China; National Dressage: 2nd, Delhi.
- 2011: National Dressage: 1st, Delhi;
- 2012: F.E.I. World Dressage Challenge: : Prix St George: 1st, Bangalore;
- 2013: National Equestrian Championships 2012: Prix St George: 1st Delhi;
- 2012, 2013, 2014: Multiple medals in National Equestrian Championships in the three Nationals.
- 2014: National Equestrian Championships 2013: Novice: 1st & 2nd Delhi;
- 2014: Incheon Asian Games 2014: Individual Ranking 8TH in Asia;
- 2018: 4 May: CDI Mariakalnok, Hungary, Intermediate 1 66.94%, Placed 4th Internationally;
- 2018: May: CDN Gestut Hallegg, Austria, Prix St. George;
- 2019: Austria, Grand Prix: 2nd position (First time an Indian stood on a podium in Europe)
- 2019: Austria Grand Prix, Germany Grand Prix, Hungary Grand Prix, Denmark Grand Prix;
- 2021: Le Mans, France Grand Prix, Germany Grand Prix, Belgium Grand Prix;
- 2022: March 31–2 April: Opglabbeek, Belgium, Prix St George + Intermediare1;
- 2022: April 20: Hagen, Germany, Grand Prix;
- 2022: April 28–29: Troisdorf, Germany, Prix St George + Intermediare1
- 2022: May 19–20: Hagen, Germany, Grand Prix + Grand Prix Special;
- 2022: June 13: Hagen, Germany, Grand Prix;
- 2022: August 6: World Championships Herning, Denmark: 64.534%;
