= Bao Yingfeng =

Chinese equestrian (born 1987)

Personal information
- Nationality: Chinese
- Born: 27 September 1987 (age 38)

Sport
- Sport: Equestrian
Medal record
Equestrian
Representing China
Asian Games
Gold medal – first place	2022 Hangzhou	Team eventing

Bao Yingfeng (born 27 September 1987) is a Chinese equestrian. He competed in the individual eventing at the 2020 Summer Olympics.
