= Jesse Campbell (equestrian) =

New Zealand equestrian

Personal information
- Nationality: New Zealander
- Born: Jesse Campbell; 29 August 1989 (age 37) Waikato, New Zealand

Sport
- Country: New Zealand
- Sport: Equestrian
- Event: Eventing

Jesse Campbell (born 29 August 1989) is a New Zealand eventing rider.

== Early life ==
Having grown up in Waikato, Campbell started riding horses at a young age. He moved to the United Kingdom as a 19-year-old and was based with fellow New Zealand team member Mark Todd, and in 2017 with Andrew Nicholson.

== Career ==
In 2013, Campbell represented New Zealand at the Eventing Nations Cup Championship.

Campbell was a reserve for the New Zealand's eventing team at the 2018 World Equestrian Games in Tryon, North Carolina with his Dutch Gelding Cleveland.

In April 2021. he rode Diachello to his 5* star debut in Kentucky. In June 2021, Campbell and Diachallo was confirmed on the New Zealand squad to compete at the delayed 2020 Olympic Games in Tokyo. After finishing in 22nd place overall at the Tokyo Olympics, a diagnosis of stomach ulcers in the horse led to a stepping back from competition. However, the pair returned to riding at a high level at the Pau 5* in October 2023.

In 2024, he was placed on the long list for the New Zealand team ahead of the 2024 Paris Olympics.

== Personal life ==
He and his wife, fellow eventer Georgie Campbell, were married in December 2020, and lived in Marlborough, running stables in Ramsbury, Wiltshire. In May 2024, Georgie Campbell was killed in a riding fall while competing in the Bicton International Horse Trials in Devon, England.
