= Hriday Chheda =

Indian equestrian athlete

Personal information
- Full name: Hriday Vipul Chheda
- Nationality: India
- Born: 24 July 1998 (age 28) India

Sport
- Country: India
- Sport: Equestrian
- Coached by: Camille Judet; Corentin Pottier
Medal record
Equestrian
Representing India
Asian Games
Gold medal – first place	2022 Hangzhou	Team dressage

Hriday Vipul Chheda (born 24 July 1998) is an Indian equestrian athlete. He was part of the Indian team that won the gold medal in the team dressage event at the 2022 Asian Games.

== Biography ==
Hriday Chheda was born on 24 July 1998. He graduated from the Mallya Aditi International School.

Chheda took up horse riding when he was six years old. He initially trained in show jumping before taking up dressage. Since 2013, he trained with various equestrian competitors in Europe and at Pamfou Dressage in France.

Chheda was part of the Indian team that won the gold medal in the team dressage at the 2022 Asian Games. It was India's first medal in the sport at the Asian Games after 1982. In the individual dressage competition, astride Chemxpro Emerald, he was leading the competition after two rounds, but was disqualified in the final round after an injury to his horse. He was part of the Indian team that competed in the team dressage event at the 2026 Asian Games.
