= Anush Agarwalla =

Indian equestrian (born 1999)

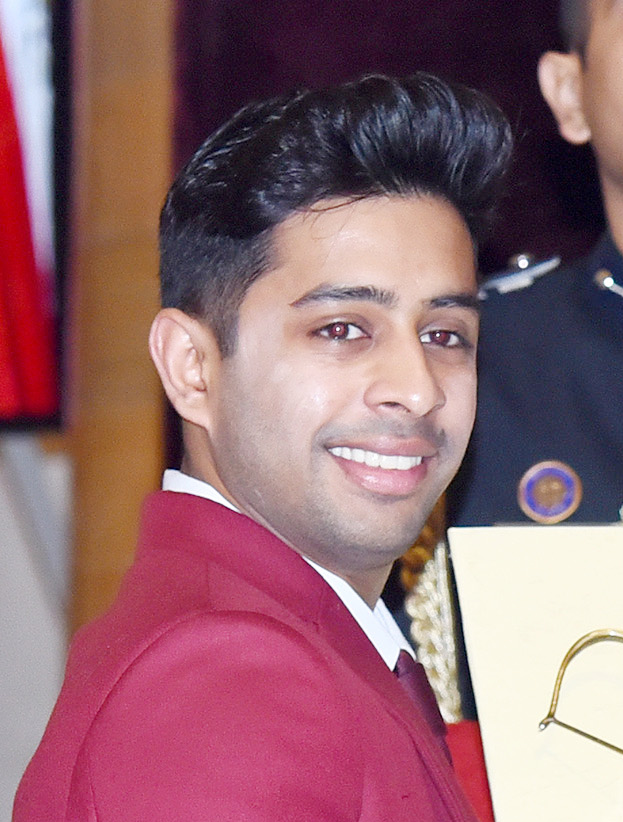
- Agarwalla in 2024

Personal information
- Nationality: India
- Born: 23 November 1999 (age 26) Kolkata, India

Sport
- Sport: Equestrian
Medal record
Equestrian
Representing India
Asian Games
Gold medal – first place	2022 Hangzhou	Team dressage
Bronze medal – third place	2022 Hangzhou	Individual dressage

Anush Agarwalla (born 23 November 1999 in Kolkata, India) is an Indian equestrian. He competed at the 2022 World Equestrian Games and was the first Indian dressage rider, alongside Shruti Vora, competing at the Dressage World Championships. He won a gold medal in the team event and a bronze medal in the individual event in Equesterian Dressage at the 2022 Asian Games. Astride Etro, Agarwalla scored 73.030 for his bronze, which is India's first medal in the dressage event at the Asian Games.

He competed in the 2024 Summer Olympics, finishing 52nd in the Grand Prix. He was the first Indian that took part in the dressage event of the Olympics.

== Early life and education ==
He started riding at the age of three in his hometown Kolkata. He was educated at La Martiniere Calcutta. At the age of 17 he moved to Germany to follow his dream to become a professional dressage rider and started training with German Olympian Hubertus Schmidt.

== Awards ==
Agarwalla was conferred with the Arjuna Award by the President of India on 9 January 2024.
