= Kazuma Tomoto =

Japanese equestrian

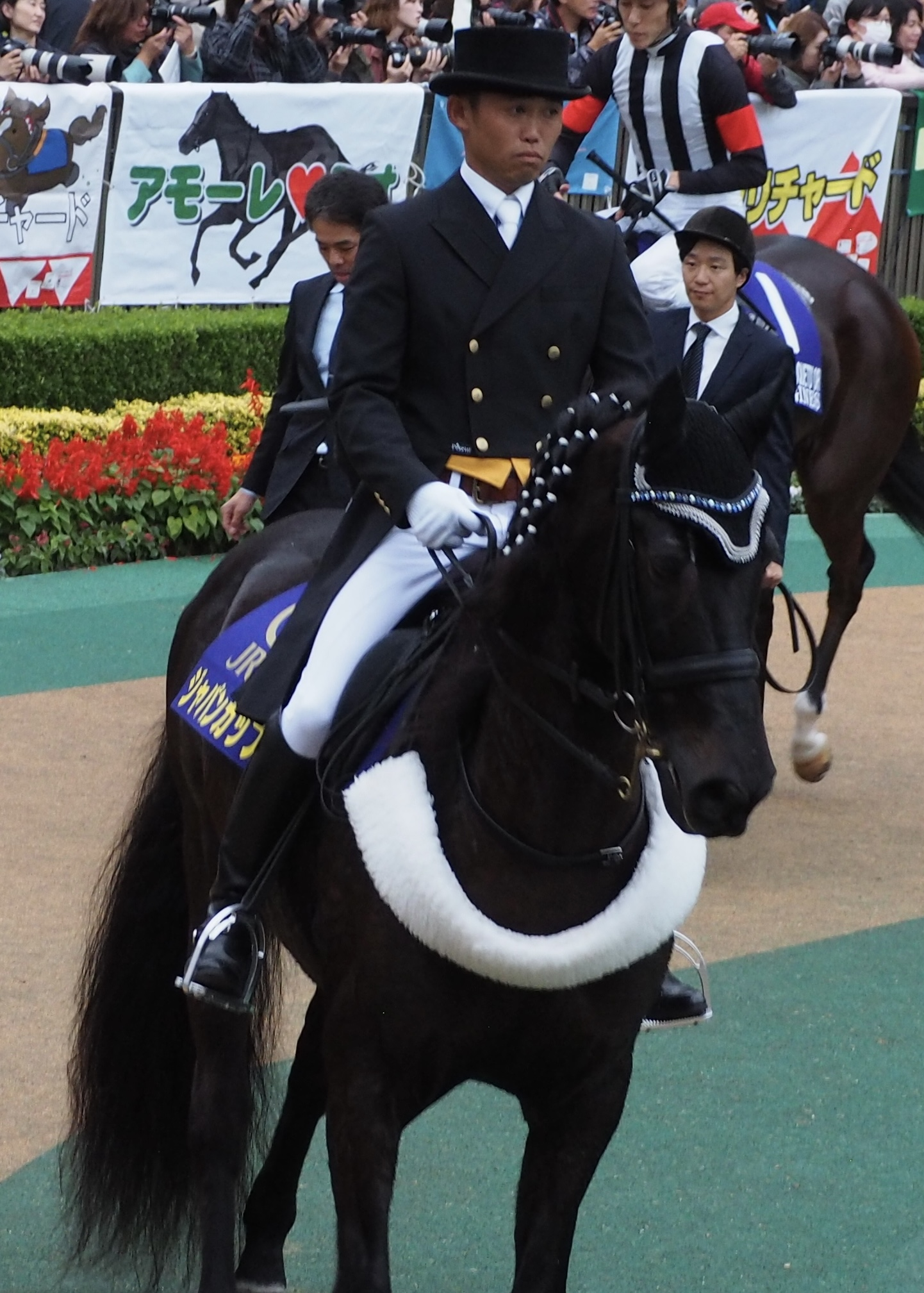
- Tomoto in 2019

Personal information
- Nationality: Japanese
- Born: 5 June 1983 (age 43) Motosu, Gifu, Japan

Sport
- Sport: Equestrian
Medal record
Equestrian
Representing Japan
Olympic Games
Bronze medal – third place	2024 Paris	Team eventing

Kazuma Tomoto (戸本一真, born 5 June 1983) is a Japanese equestrian. He competed in eventing at the 2020 Summer Olympics, placing fourth in the individual competition. He represented Japan in showjumping until 2015, before switching focus to eventing. He currently works for Japan Racing Association, as a racetrack rider.
