= Natalie Lankester =

Emirati equestrian (born 1989)

Personal information
- Full name: Natalie Tania Joanna Lankester
- Born: 6 July 1989 (age 37) Shropshire, United Kingdom

Sport
- Country: United Arab Emirates
- Sport: Equestrian

Achievements and titles
- Regional finals: 2022 Asian Games

Natalie Tania Joanna Lankester (born 6 July 1989) is a British born Emirati dressage rider. Lankester was part of the first ever Emirati dressage team during the 2022 Asian Games in Hangzhou, China and has represented the United Arab Emirates at various international dressage competitions in Europe.

She is married to show-jumper and member of the royal family in the United Arab Emirates, Sheikh Rashid Bin Ahmed Al Maktoum who also competed at the 2022 Asian Games.
