= Ryo Murata =

Japanese equestrian (born 1995)

Personal information
- Nationality: Japanese
- Discipline: Eventing
- Born: 31 October 1995 (age 31)
- Horse: Brookpark Vikenti
Medal record
Eventing
Representing Japan
Asian Games
Silver medal – second place	2026 Aichi–Nagoya	Team eventing

Ryo Murata (Japanese: 村田 諒; born 31 October 1995) is a Japanese equestrian who competes in eventing. He is affiliated with the Japan Racing Association (JRA). Murata represented Japan at the 2026 Asian Games, where he won a silver medal in the team eventing competition.

== Career ==
Murata graduated from the Nippon Veterinary and Life Science University in 2019, where he served as captain of its equestrian club. He later became affiliated with the Japan Racing Association and competed in eventing, a discipline combining dressage, cross-country and show jumping.

Murata was selected to represent Japan in eventing at the 2026 Asian Games in Aichi–Nagoya. Riding Brookpark Vikenti, he competed in the individual and team events. Japan won the team silver medal with a total of 115.2 penalty points, finishing behind Thailand. Murata placed 18th in the individual event after incurring penalties in the cross-country phase.
