= Korntawat Samran =

Thai equestrian

Personal information
- Nationality: Thai
- Born: 15 December 1997 (age 28) Bangkok, Thailand

Sport
- Sport: Equestrian
Medal record
Equestrian
Representing Thailand
Asian Games
| Gold medal – first place | 2026 Aichi–Nagoya | Team eventing |
| Silver medal – second place | 2022 Hangzhou | Individual eventing |
| Bronze medal – third place | 2022 Hangzhou | Team eventing |

Korntawat Samran (Thai: กรธวัช สำราญ; born 15 December 1997) is a Thai equestrian. He competed in the individual eventing at the 2020 Summer Olympics.
