= Divyakriti Singh =

Equestrian athlete

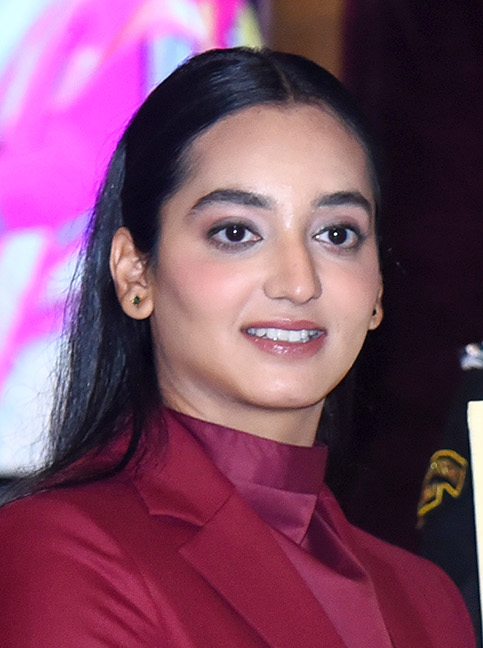
- Singh in 2024

Personal information
- Nationality: India
- Born: 22 October 1999 (age 26) Jaipur, India

Sport
- Country: India
- Sport: Equestrian dressage
Medal record
Equestrian
Representing India
Asian Games
Gold medal – first place	2022 Hangzhou	Team dressage
Asian Championships
Silver medal – second place	2025 Pattaya	Team dressage

Divyakriti Singh (born 22 October 1999) is an Indian equestrian. She won a gold medal in team event in Equestrian Dressage at the 2022 Asian Games held at Hangzhou, China. She is the first Indian woman equestrian to be conferred the Arjuna Award in Equestrian for outstanding performance in Sports and Games 2023 by the Ministry of Youth Affairs & Sports by the Government of India. Divyakriti has been appointed as the Election Icon for Rajasthan by the Election Commission of India. She has won Times of India Sports Awards (2023) Equestrian Rider of the Year. She won a team Silver at the FEI Asian Championships Pattaya 2025.

She has been involved in equestrian sports since the age of 12, and has received numerous individual and team medals at events such as the Junior National Equestrian Championships and All India IPSC equestrian competitions. Singh achieved a World ranking of 14 and Asian ranking of 1 early in 2023, according to the International Federation for Equestrian Sports (FEI) dressage world ranking of athletes - CD1*DIO1'.

== Early life and family ==
Singh hails from Jaipur, Rajasthan, India. She completed her school education from Mayo College Girls School, Ajmer, Rajasthan and completed her graduation from Jesus and Mary College (JMC), Delhi University, India. Divyakriti is the daughter of Vikram Singh Rathore and Alka TejSingh and has one elder sibling, Digvijay Singh.

== Career ==
- IPA Junior National Polo Championship Winner in 2016
- IPA Junior National Polo Championship Winner in 2017
- Junior National Equestrian Championship for year 2016-2017 at New Delhi, India - JNEC Junior Dressage Individual: Silver Medal; Team: Bronze Medal
- Junior National Equestrian Championship 2018-2019 at Kolkata, India - JNEC Young Rider Dressage Team: Gold Meal (Reference: Equestrian Federation of India
- Junior National Equestrian Championship 2019-2020 at Bangalore, India - JNEC Young Rider Dressage Team: Silver Medal
- At International Dressage Competition CDI, Riyadh, Saudi Arabia, won an Individual Silver in Dressage Prix St. Georges with a score of 70.196. Individual Bronze in Dressage Intermediate 1 with a score of 68.9 and Individual Bronze in Freestyle to Music with a score of 72.575.

== Awards ==
Arjuna Award 2023.
India Today Woman Summit Award on 26 October 2023.
The Sawai Jaipur Awards 2023, H.H. Maharaja Sawai Padmanabh Award for Young Achiever in the field of Sport.
Time of India Sports Award (TOISA) 2023 Equestrian Rider of the Year
Marwar Ratna 2024.
Rajasthan Gaurav 2024.
Team Silver at Asian Championship at Pattaya, Thailand in 2025.
