= Weerapat Pitakanonda =

Thai equestrian

Personal information
- Nationality: Thai
- Born: 4 September 1983 (age 43)

Sport
- Sport: Equestrian
Medal record
Equestrian
Representing Thailand
Asian Games
Gold medal – first place	2026 Aichi–Nagoya	Team eventing
Bronze medal – third place	2022 Hangzhou	Team eventing

Weerapat Pitakanonda (Thai: วีรฏัท ปฏิกานนท์; born 4 September 1983) is a Thai equestrian. He competed in the individual eventing at the 2020 Summer Olympics.
