= Sudipti Hajela =

Equestrian athlete

Personal information
- Nationality: India
- Born: 10 May 2002 (age 24) Indore, India
- Home town: Indore, India

Sport
- Country: India
- Sport: Equestrian dressage
Medal record
Equestrian
Representing India
Asian Games
| Gold medal – first place | 2022 Hangzhou | Team dressage |

Sudipti Hejala (born 10 May 2002) is an Indian equestrian athlete. She was part of the team that won a gold medal in team event in Equestrian Dressage at the 2022 Asian Games, which included Agarwalla Anush, Chheda Hriday, Agarwalla Anush, Singh Divyakrit.
