= Equestrian at the 2010 Asian Games – Individual jumping =

Individual jumping at the 2010 Asian Games
- Venue: Guangzhou Equestrian Venue
- Date: 22–24 November 2010
- Competitors: 39 from 14 nations

Medalists
gold medal	Ramzy Al-Duhami	Saudi Arabia
silver medal	Latifa Al-Maktoum	United Arab Emirates
bronze medal	Khaled Al-Eid	Saudi Arabia

Individual jumping equestrian at the 2010 Asian Games was held in Guangzhou Equestrian Venue, Guangzhou, China from November 22 to November 24, 2010.

== Schedule ==
All times are China Standard Time (UTC+08:00)

Date	Time	Event
Monday, 22 November 2010	09:00	1st qualifier
Monday, 22 November 2010	14:00	2nd qualifier
Wednesday, 24 November 2010	09:00	Final round A
Wednesday, 24 November 2010	14:00	Final round B

== Results ==
Legend

- EL — Eliminated
- RT — Retired
- WD — Withdrawn

=== Qualifier ===
Rank	Athlete	Horse	1st qualifier			2nd qualifier			Total
Rank	Athlete	Horse	Jump	Time	Total	Jump	Time	Total	Total
1	Ahmad Hamcho (SYR)	Wonderboy III	0	0	0	0	0	0	0
1	Khaled Al-Eid (KSA)	Presley Boy	0	0	0	0	0	0	0
1	Ali Al-Thani (QAT)	Dukhan	0	0	0	0	0	0	0
1	Ramzy Al-Duhami (KSA)	Bayard v Devilla T.	0	0	0	0	0	0	0
1	Kenneth Cheng (HKG)	JC Can Do	0	0	0	0	0	0	0
1	Sohn Bong-gak (KOR)	Centurio 25	0	0	0	0	0	0	0
7	Latifa Al-Maktoum (UAE)	Kalaska de Semilly	0	3	3	0	0	0	3
8	Jasmine Chen (TPE)	Quin Chin	0	0	0	4	0	4	4
8	Daisuke Mizuyama (JPN)	Off the Road	4	0	4	0	0	0	4
8	Ahmed Al-Junaibi (UAE)	Picobello Wodiena	0	0	0	4	0	4	4
8	Abdullah Al-Sharbatly (KSA)	Melodie Ardente	0	0	0	4	0	4	4
12	Patrick Lam (HKG)	JC Tilburg	4	0	4	0	1	1	5
13	Abdullah Al-Saud (KSA)	Mobily A. Obelix	0	0	0	8	0	8	8
13	Majid Al-Qassimi (UAE)	Co-Jack	0	0	0	8	0	8	8
15	Zhang Bin (CHN)	Heraldo	4	1	5	4	0	4	9
15	Heo Jun-sung (KOR)	Sun Fire 2	0	0	0	8	1	9	9
15	Joy Chen (TPE)	Platini VDL	0	0	0	8	1	9	9
15	Mubarak Al-Rumaihi (QAT)	Castiglione L	0	1	1	8	0	8	9
19	Jacqueline Lai (HKG)	Capone 22	0	2	2	8	0	8	10
20	Pg Mohd Nasir (BRU)	Rudolf Z	4	2	6	4	2	6	12
20	Rashid Al-Maktoum (UAE)	Dubai's Pride	8	0	8	4	0	4	12
20	Ali Al-Rumaihi (QAT)	Ambiente 55	8	0	8	4	0	4	12
23	Kim Sung-whan (KOR)	Qualitia Vande Groene	4	1	5	8	2	10	15
23	Li Zhenqiang (CHN)	Thunder Bolt	0	2	2	8	5	13	15
25	Catherine Chew (SIN)	Claim Collin	8	1	9	8	1	9	18
26	Chen Jingchuan (CHN)	Coertis	8	3	11	8	1	9	20
27	Samantha Lam (HKG)	JC Crunship	16	1	17	4	0	4	21
27	Satoshi Hirao (JPN)	Udaryllis	8	1	9	12	0	12	21
29	Reiko Takeda (JPN)	Ticannaf	16	2	18	4	0	4	22
30	Atsushi Katayama (JPN)	Asterix	16	2	18	12	1	13	31
31	Kim Seok (KOR)	Lido des Broches	20	2	22	12	1	13	35
32	Syed Mohsin Al-Mohdzar (MAS)	Linus	28	2	30	16	4	20	50
33	Lu Ting-hsuan (TPE)	Cobos	50	0	50	8	3	11	61
—	Kapilesh Bhate (IND)	London Olympics	20	1	21			EL	EL
—	Wong I-sheau (TPE)	Item de Quintin			EL				EL
—	Faleh Al-Ajami (QAT)	Logo 28			EL				EL
—	Nulahemaiti Abai (CHN)	Lauxley de Breve			EL				EL
—	Hasan Al-Khalifa (BRN)	Tennessee W			EL				EL
—	Syed Omar Al-Mohdzar (MAS)	Manila VDL			EL				EL

=== Final round A ===
Rank	Athlete	Horse	Penalties		Total
Rank	Athlete	Horse	Jump	Time	Total
1	Ali Al-Rumaihi (QAT)	Ambiente 55	0	0	0
1	Khaled Al-Eid (KSA)	Presley Boy	0	0	0
1	Ramzy Al-Duhami (KSA)	Bayard v Devilla T.	0	0	0
1	Satoshi Hirao (JPN)	Udaryllis	0	0	0
1	Latifa Al-Maktoum (UAE)	Kalaska de Semilly	0	0	0
6	Mubarak Al-Rumaihi (QAT)	Castiglione L	0	1	1
7	Jasmine Chen (TPE)	Quin Chin	4	0	4
7	Ahmad Hamcho (SYR)	Wonderboy III	4	0	4
7	Abdullah Al-Sharbatly (KSA)	Melodie Ardente	4	0	4
7	Majid Al-Qassimi (UAE)	Co-Jack	4	0	4
11	Li Zhenqiang (CHN)	Thunder Bolt	4	1	5
12	Daisuke Mizuyama (JPN)	Off the Road	8	0	8
12	Ahmed Al-Junaibi (UAE)	Picobello Wodiena	8	0	8
12	Zhang Bin (CHN)	Heraldo	8	0	8
12	Catherine Chew (SIN)	Claim Collin	8	0	8
16	Pg Mohd Nasir (BRU)	Rudolf Z	8	1	9
16	Kenneth Cheng (HKG)	JC Can Do	8	1	9
18	Kim Sung-whan (KOR)	Qualitia Vande Groene	12	0	12
19	Ali Al-Thani (QAT)	Dukhan	8	5	13
20	Sohn Bong-gak (KOR)	Centurio 25	16	0	16
20	Heo Jun-sung (KOR)	Sun Fire 2	16	0	16
22	Jacqueline Lai (HKG)	Capone 22	16	3	19
23	Syed Mohsin Al-Mohdzar (MAS)	Linus	24	3	27
24	Reiko Takeda (JPN)	Ticannaf	24	7	31
—	Joy Chen (TPE)	Platini VDL			EL
—	Patrick Lam (HKG)	JC Tilburg			WD

=== Final round B ===
Rank	Athlete	Horse	Round A	Penalties			Total	Jump-off	
Rank	Athlete	Horse	Round A	Jump	Time	Total	Total	Pen.	Time
1st place, gold medalist(s)	Ramzy Al-Duhami (KSA)	Bayard v Devilla T.	0	0	0	0	0	0	48.52
2nd place, silver medalist(s)	Latifa Al-Maktoum (UAE)	Kalaska de Semilly	0	0	0	0	0	0	48.83
3rd place, bronze medalist(s)	Khaled Al-Eid (KSA)	Presley Boy	0	0	0	0	0	8	47.50
4	Mubarak Al-Rumaihi (QAT)	Castiglione L	1	4	0	4	5		
5	Ahmad Hamcho (SYR)	Wonderboy III	4	4	0	4	8		
5	Jasmine Chen (TPE)	Quin Chin	4	4	0	4	8		
5	Ali Al-Rumaihi (QAT)	Ambiente 55	0	8	0	8	8		
5	Satoshi Hirao (JPN)	Udaryllis	0	8	0	8	8		
5	Majid Al-Qassimi (UAE)	Co-Jack	4	4	0	4	8		
10	Daisuke Mizuyama (JPN)	Off the Road	8	4	0	4	12		
11	Pg Mohd Nasir (BRU)	Rudolf Z	9	4	0	4	13		
12	Kenneth Cheng (HKG)	JC Can Do	9	8	0	8	17		
12	Kim Sung-whan (KOR)	Qualitia Vande Groene	12	4	1	5	17		
14	Jacqueline Lai (HKG)	Capone 22	19	0	0	0	19		
15	Zhang Bin (CHN)	Heraldo	8	12	0	12	20		
15	Catherine Chew (SIN)	Claim Collin	8	12	0	12	20		
17	Li Zhenqiang (CHN)	Thunder Bolt	5	28	4	32	37		
—	Sohn Bong-gak (KOR)	Centurio 25	16			RT	RT		
