= Equestrian at the 2014 Asian Games – Individual jumping =

Individual jumping at the 2014 Asian Games
- Venue: Incheon Dream Park
- Date: 28–30 September 2014
- Competitors: 41 from 13 nations

Medalists
gold medal	Abdullah Al-Sharbatly	Saudi Arabia
silver medal	Satoshi Hirao	Japan
bronze medal	Taizo Sugitani	Japan

Individual jumping equestrian at the 2014 Asian Games was held in Dream Park Equestrian Venue, Incheon, South Korea from September 28 to September 30, 2014.

== Schedule ==
All times are Korea Standard Time (UTC+09:00)

Date	Time	Event
Sunday, 28 September 2014	09:00	1st qualifier
Sunday, 28 September 2014	13:00	2nd qualifier
Tuesday, 30 September 2014	10:00	Final round A
Tuesday, 30 September 2014	14:00	Final round B

== Results ==
Legend

- EL — Eliminated
- WD — Withdrawn

=== Qualifier ===
Rank	Athlete	Horse	1st qualifier			2nd qualifier			Total
Rank	Athlete	Horse	Jump	Time	Total	Jump	Time	Total	Total
1	Nasser Al-Ghazali (QAT)	Delloren	0	0	0	0	0	0	0
1	Faisal Al-Shalan (KSA)	Talan	0	0	0	0	0	0	0
1	Ali Al-Thani (QAT)	Vinna Olympic	0	0	0	0	0	0	0
1	Khalid Al-Emadi (QAT)	Tamira IV	0	0	0	0	0	0	0
1	Salman Al-Maqadi (KSA)	Senorita	0	0	0	0	0	0	0
1	Taizo Sugitani (JPN)	Avenzio 3	0	0	0	0	0	0	0
7	Mohamed Al-Owais (UAE)	Et is wie es is KJ	0	0	0	0	1	1	1
8	Jacqueline Lai (HKG)	Capone 22	0	1	1	0	2	2	3
8	Bassem Hassan Mohammed (QAT)	Anyway II	0	1	1	0	2	2	3
10	Wong I-sheau (TPE)	Zadarijke V	0	0	0	4	0	4	4
10	Satoshi Hirao (JPN)	Ulano	0	0	0	4	0	4	4
10	Kim Seok (KOR)	Lido des Broches	0	0	0	4	0	4	4
10	Latifa Al-Maktoum (UAE)	Peanuts de Beaufour	4	0	4	0	0	0	4
14	Abdullah Al-Sharbatly (KSA)	Callahan	0	1	1	4	0	4	5
15	Diego Lorenzo (PHI)	HS Contino	0	1	1	4	1	5	6
15	Toni Leviste (PHI)	Maximillian	0	1	1	4	1	5	6
17	Jun Jae-hee (KOR)	Una Traviatta	0	1	1	4	2	6	7
18	Catherine Chew (SIN)	Coquira	0	2	2	4	2	6	8
18	Tadahiro Hayashi (JPN)	Loretto Classic	4	0	4	4	0	4	8
20	Abdullah Al-Marri (UAE)	Sierra Antika Joter	4	1	5	4	0	4	9
20	Samantha Lam (HKG)	Adonis	4	1	5	4	0	4	9
20	Joker Arroyo (PHI)	Didi de Goedereede	0	0	0	8	1	9	9
23	Raena Leung (HKG)	Lalik 2	4	1	5	4	1	5	10
23	Huang Po-hsiang (TPE)	MCB Cassilia	4	3	7	0	3	3	10
25	Ali Al-Khorafi (KUW)	Ventje	8	1	9	0	2	2	11
26	Takashi Utsunomiya (JPN)	Touche Pas A Rivereuille	4	0	0	8	0	8	12
26	Abdulrahman Al-Rajhi (KSA)	New Orleans	0	0	0	12	0	12	12
28	Sailub Lertratanachai (THA)	Vrauke W	8	0	8	4	1	5	13
28	Lu Ting-hsuan (TPE)	Cobos	0	1	1	8	4	12	13
30	Moftah Al-Dhaheri (UAE)	Al-Yamamah	4	2	6	8	0	8	14
31	Mateo Lorenzo (PHI)	Carlie 3	12	1	13	4	1	5	18
32	Oh Sung-hwan (KOR)	Chintan	12	6	18	0	2	2	20
33	Diah Wulandari Hamidjojo (INA)	General G	8	7	15	4	3	7	22
34	Lan Yu-chun (TPE)	Chin Win	8	0	8	16	1	17	25
35	Yashaan Zubin Khambatta (IND)	Olgy	8	1	9	16	4	20	29
36	Siengsaw Lertratanachai (THA)	Dakota	20	3	23	16	8	24	47
—	Kenneth Cheng (HKG)	Jockey Club Caballo	8	0	8			EL	EL
—	Alex Davis (THA)	Voloma	8	1	9			EL	EL
—	Sehaj Singh Virk (IND)	Laila Lordanos			EL				EL
—	Heo Jun-sung (KOR)	Sun Fire 2			EL				EL
—	Ashray Butta (IND)	Allegro			WD				WD

=== Final round A ===
Rank	Athlete	Horse	Penalties		Total
Rank	Athlete	Horse	Jump	Time	Total
1	Ali Al-Khorafi (KUW)	Ventje	0	0	0
1	Raena Leung (HKG)	Lalik 2	0	0	0
1	Catherine Chew (SIN)	Coquira	0	0	0
1	Diego Lorenzo (PHI)	HS Contino	0	0	0
1	Toni Leviste (PHI)	Maximillian	0	0	0
1	Abdullah Al-Sharbatly (KSA)	Callahan	0	0	0
1	Satoshi Hirao (JPN)	Ulano	0	0	0
1	Faisal Al-Shalan (KSA)	Talan	0	0	0
1	Bassem Hassan Mohammed (QAT)	Anyway II	0	0	0
1	Taizo Sugitani (JPN)	Avenzio 3	0	0	0
11	Oh Sung-hwan (KOR)	Chintan	4	0	4
11	Sailub Lertratanachai (THA)	Vrauke W	4	0	4
11	Samantha Lam (HKG)	Adonis	4	0	4
11	Jun Jae-hee (KOR)	Una Traviatta	4	0	4
11	Wong I-sheau (TPE)	Zadarijke V	4	0	4
11	Latifa Al-Maktoum (UAE)	Peanuts de Beaufour	4	0	4
11	Jacqueline Lai (HKG)	Capone 22	4	0	4
11	Mohamed Al-Owais (UAE)	Et is wie es is KJ	4	0	4
11	Nasser Al-Ghazali (QAT)	Delloren	4	0	4
20	Abdullah Al-Marri (UAE)	Sierra Antika Joter	8	0	8
20	Joker Arroyo (PHI)	Didi de Goedereede	8	0	8
20	Tadahiro Hayashi (JPN)	Loretto Classic	8	0	8
20	Kim Seok (KOR)	Lido des Broches	8	0	8
20	Khalid Al-Emadi (QAT)	Tamira IV	8	0	8
25	Huang Po-hsiang (TPE)	MCB Cassilia	8	4	12
26	Diah Wulandari Hamidjojo (INA)	General G	16	1	17
26	Lu Ting-hsuan (TPE)	Cobos	16	1	17
28	Yashaan Zubin Khambatta (IND)	Olgy	16	2	18
—	Salman Al-Maqadi (KSA)	Senorita			EL

=== Final round B ===
Rank	Athlete	Horse	Round A	Penalties			Total	Jump-off	
Rank	Athlete	Horse	Round A	Jump	Time	Total	Total	Pen.	Time
1st place, gold medalist(s)	Abdullah Al-Sharbatly (KSA)	Callahan	0	0	0	0	0	0	33.64
2nd place, silver medalist(s)	Satoshi Hirao (JPN)	Ulano	0	0	0	0	0	4	39.36
3rd place, bronze medalist(s)	Taizo Sugitani (JPN)	Avenzio 3	0	4	0	4	4	0	30.95
4	Latifa Al-Maktoum (UAE)	Peanuts de Beaufour	4	0	0	0	4	0	32.34
5	Faisal Al-Shalan (KSA)	Talan	0	4	0	4	4	0	33.04
6	Toni Leviste (PHI)	Maximillian	0	4	0	4	4	0	34.20
7	Oh Sung-hwan (KOR)	Chintan	4	0	0	0	4	0	35.48
8	Nasser Al-Ghazali (QAT)	Delloren	4	0	0	0	4	8	30.38
9	Raena Leung (HKG)	Lalik 2	0	4	0	4	4	8	37.33
10	Bassem Hassan Mohammed (QAT)	Anyway II	0	4	0	4	4	9	40.07
11	Jun Jae-hee (KOR)	Una Traviatta	4	4	0	4	8		
11	Wong I-sheau (TPE)	Zadarijke V	4	4	0	4	8		
11	Mohamed Al-Owais (UAE)	Et is wie es is KJ	4	4	0	4	8		
14	Diego Lorenzo (PHI)	HS Contino	0	8	1	9	9		
15	Sailub Lertratanachai (THA)	Vrauke W	4	8	0	8	12		
15	Catherine Chew (SIN)	Coquira	0	12	0	12	12		
17	Jacqueline Lai (HKG)	Capone 22	4	12	0	12	16		
17	Ali Al-Khorafi (KUW)	Ventje	0	16	0	16	16		
19	Huang Po-hsiang (TPE)	MCB Cassilia	12	4	2	6	18		
—	Diah Wulandari Hamidjojo (INA)	General G	17			EL	EL		
