= Equestrian at the 2022 Asian Games – Individual jumping =

Individual jumping at the 2022 Asian Games
- Venue: Tonglu Equestrian Centre
- Date: 4–6 October 2023
- Competitors: 51 from 17 nations

Medalists
gold medal	Abdullah Al-Sharbatly	Saudi Arabia
silver medal	Omar Al-Jneibi	United Arab Emirates
bronze medal	Abdullah Mohd Al-Marri	United Arab Emirates

Individual jumping equestrian at the 2022 Asian Games was held in Tonglu Equestrian Centre, from 4 to 6 October 2023.

== Schedule ==
All times are China Standard Time (UTC+08:00)

Date	Time	Event
Wednesday, 4 October 2023	09:00	Qualifier 1
Wednesday, 4 October 2023	14:00	Qualifier 2
Friday, 6 October 2023	09:00	Final round 1
Friday, 6 October 2023	14:00	Final round 2

== Results ==
Legend

- EL — Eliminated
- RT — Retired
- WD — Withdrawn

=== Qualifier 1 ===
Rank	Athlete	Horse	Penalties		
Rank	Athlete	Horse	Jump	Time	Total
1	Abdulrahman Bader Al-Rajhi (KSA)	Ventago	0	0	0
1	Abdulla Al-Marri (UAE)	James V.D Oude Heihoef	0	0	0
1	Bekzod Kurbanov (UZB)	Santos Hippica	0	0	0
1	Taizo Sugitani (JPN)	Quincy 194	0	0	0
1	Abdulrahman Al-Fuzae (KUW)	Gijsbrand	0	0	0
1	Faleh Al-Ajami (QAT)	Ghana	0	0	0
1	Meshari Alhumaidi Al-Harbi (KSA)	Cascadello Boy RM	0	0	0
1	Omar Al-Jneibi (UAE)	Dalida Van De Zuuthoeve	0	0	0
1	Khurshidbek Alimdjanov (UZB)	Champion League	0	0	0
1	Heo Jeong-hoon (KOR)	Karisto Van De Mishagen	0	0	0
1	Annaz Al-Annaz (KUW)	Carlsson 69	0	0	0
1	Chen Yuchen (CHN)	Gaga E D'Auguyijn	0	0	0
1	Amre Hamcho (SYR)	Vagabon Des Forets	0	0	0
1	Ahmad Saber Hamcho (SYR)	Vintadge De La Roque	0	0	0
1	Chew Yen Tung (SGP)	Holanda VDL	0	0	0
1	Janakabhorn Karunayadhaj (THA)	Maxwin Kinmar Agalux	0	0	0
1	Ramzy Al-Duhami (KSA)	Untouchable 32	0	0	0
1	Salem Al-Suwaidi (UAE)	Diamond Way	0	0	0
1	Mike Kawai (JPN)	Goldway	0	0	0
1	Clarissa de Lyra (HKG)	Guardiola - N	0	0	0
1	Rashid Al-Marri (QAT)	Concordess Nrw	0	0	0
1	Wang Yunjing (CHN)	Hoselinde	0	0	0
1	Abdullah Al-Sharbatly (KSA)	Skorphults Baloutendro	0	0	0
1	Mohamed Al-Hajri (UAE)	GS Fabian	0	0	0
1	Yuko Itakura (JPN)	Stakkatisa PS	0	0	0
1	Ali Al-Kharafi (KUW)	I	0	0	0
1	Lai Jacqueline Jing-Man (HKG)	I'm Special	0	0	0
1	Bassem Hassan Mohammed (QAT)	Incredible W	0	0	0
29	Li Yaofeng (CHN)	Jericho Dwerse Hagen	0	1	1
30	Lee Yo-Seb (KOR)	Levado Van Het Molenrietven	4	0	4
30	Hsieh Ping-Yang (TPE)	Nerio De La Haute Bruyeres	4	0	4
30	Masoud Mokarinezhad (IRI)	Gringo	4	0	4
30	Tomoki Koshidaka (JPN)	Cortis De Nyze Z	4	0	4
30	Khalifa Al-Thani (QAT)	Ierland VDL	4	0	4
30	Yash Nensee (IND)	D A Mour Du Wenuphar	4	0	4
30	Brayen Nathan Brata-Coolen (INA)	Aragon Castello H	4	0	4
30	Abdullah Al-Awadhi (KUW)	I Cantou Du Fonds Des Flo	4	0	4
30	Lin Tzu-Yen (TPE)	Feeling Lucky	4	0	4
30	Naghmeh Khanjani (IRI)	Take A Chance Vande Brae	4	0	4
30	Chen Yu-Lung (TPE)	Gaen	4	0	4
41	Hsiao Yu-Cheng (TPE)	S & L Exxon Hedonist	8	0	8
41	Lim Sung-Ro (KOR)	Cassido GZ	8	0	8
41	Jung Chul-Hee (KOR)	Monte Pleasure	8	0	8
44	Umidjon Komilov (UZB)	Ventago	12	0	12
44	Omid Gharibighahareh (IRI)	Kabisto	12	0	12
44	Bakhromjon Gaziev (UZB)	Lady	12	0	12
47	Patrick Lam (HKG)	Lopez One	12	12	24
48	Nageswaran Shoorendran (MAS)	Wanskjaer Cuneo	16	9	25
-	Ma Melinda Lin (HKG)	Carblue	EL		
-	Kirat Singh Nagra (IND)	Alvin B	EL		
-	Tejas Dhingra (IND)	Stan KJ	EL		

=== Qualifier 2 ===
Rank	Athlete	Horse	Prev. rounds	Penalties			Total
Rank	Athlete	Horse	Prev. rounds	Jump	Time	Total	Total
1	Abdulrahman Bader Al-Rajhi (KSA)	Ventago	0	0	0	0	0
1	Abdulla Al-Marri (UAE)	James V.D Oude Heihoef	0	0	0	0	0
1	Taizo Sugitani (JPN)	Quincy 194	0	0	0	0	0
1	Faleh Al-Ajami (QAT)	Ghana	0	0	0	0	0
1	Meshari Alhumaidi Al-Harbi (KSA)	Cascadello Boy RM	0	0	0	0	0
1	Omar Al-Jneibi (UAE)	Dalida Van De Zuuthoeve	0	0	0	0	0
1	Annaz Al-Annaz (KUW)	Carlsson 69	0	0	0	0	0
1	Ahmad Saber Hamcho (SYR)	Vintadge De La Roque	0	0	0	0	0
1	Chew Yen Tung (SGP)	Holanda VDL	0	0	0	0	0
1	Ramzy Al-Duhami (KSA)	Untouchable 32	0	0	0	0	0
1	Salem Al-Suwaidi (UAE)	Diamond Way	0	0	0	0	0
1	Rashid Al-Marri (QAT)	Concordess Nrw	0	0	0	0	0
1	Lai Jacqueline Jing-Man (HKG)	I'm Special	0	0	0	0	0
1	Abdullah Al-Sharbatly (KSA)	Skorphults Baloutendro	0	0	0	0	0
1	Mohamed Al-Hajri (UAE)	GS Fabian	0	0	0	0	0
1	Yuko Itakura (JPN)	Stakkatisa PS	0	0	0	0	0
1	Ali Al-Kharafi (KUW)	I	0	0	0	0	0
1	Bassem Hassan Mohammed (QAT)	Incredible W	0	0	0	0	0
19	Li Yaofeng (CHN)	Jericho Dwerse Hagen	1	0	0	0	1
20	Hsieh Ping-Yang (TPE)	Nerio De La Haute Bruyeres	4	0	0	0	4
20	Masoud Mokarinezhad (IRI)	Gringo	4	0	0	0	4
20	Chen Yuchen (CHN)	Gaga E D'Auguyijn	0	4	0	4	4
20	Amre Hamcho (SYR)	Vagabon Des Forets	0	4	0	4	4
20	Janakabhorn Karunayadhaj (THA)	Maxwin Kinmar Agalux	0	4	0	4	4
20	Clarissa de Lyra (HKG)	Guardiola - N	0	4	0	4	4
26	Bekzod Kurbanov (UZB)	Santos Hippica	0	8	0	8	8
26	Khurshidbek Alimdjanov (UZB)	Champion League	0	8	0	8	8
26	Heo Jeong-hoon (KOR)	Karisto Van De Mishagen	0	8	0	8	8
26	Khalifa Al-Thani (QAT)	Ierland VDL	4	4	0	4	8
26	Brayen Nathan Brata-Coolen (INA)	Aragon Castello H	4	4	0	4	8
26	Wang Yunjing (CHN)	Hoselinde	0	8	0	8	8
26	Abdullah Al-Awadhi (KUW)	I Cantou Du Fonds Des Flo	4	4	0	4	8
26	Naghmeh Khanjani (IRI)	Take A Chance Vande Brae	4	4	0	4	8
26	Chen Yu-Lung (TPE)	Gaen	4	4	0	4	8
35	Lim Sung-Ro (KOR)	Cassido GZ	8	8	0	8	16
35	Bakhromjon Gaziev (UZB)	Lady	12	4	0	4	16
35	Jung Chul-Hee (KOR)	Monte Pleasure	8	8	0	8	16
38	Lee Yo-Seb (KOR)	Levado Van Het Molenrietven	4	8	7	15	19
39	Abdulrahman Al-Fuzae (KUW)	Gijsbrand	0	20	0	20	20
39	Lin Tzu-Yen (TPE)	Feeling Lucky	4	16	0	16	20
41	Yash Nensee (IND)	D A Mour Du Wenuphar	4	16	3	19	23
42	Mike Kawai (JPN)	Goldway	0	12	12	24	24
43	Patrick Lam (HKG)	Lopez One	24	4	0	4	28
43	Omid Gharibighahareh (IRI)	Kabisto	12	16	0	16	28
45	Umidjon Komilov (UZB)	Ventago	12	20	0	20	32
46	Hsiao Yu-Cheng (TPE)	S & L Exxon Hedonist	8	8	25	33	41
47	Nageswaran Shoorendran (MAS)	Wanskjaer Cuneo	25	8	16	24	49
-	Tomoki Koshidaka (JPN)	Cortis De Nyze Z	4	EL			

=== Final round 1 ===
Rank	Athlete	Horse	Penalties			Notes
Rank	Athlete	Horse	Jump	Time	Total	Notes
1	Omar Al-Jneibi (UAE)	Dalida Van De Zuuthoeve	0	0	0	Q
1	Ahmad Saber Hamcho (SYR)	Vintadge De La Roque	0	0	0	Q
1	Chen Yuchen (CHN)	Gaga E D'Auguyijn	0	0	0	Q
1	Abdullah Al-Sharbatly (KSA)	Skorphults Baloutendro	0	0	0	Q
1	Faleh Al-Ajami (QAT)	Ghana	0	0	0	Q
1	Rashid Al-Marri (QAT)	Concordess Nrw	0	0	0	Q
1	Abdulrahman Bader Al-Rajhi (KSA)	Ventago	0	0	0	Q
1	Naghmeh Khanjani (IRI)	Take A Chance Vande Brae	0	0	0	Q
9	Nageswaran Shoorendran (MAS)	Wanskjaer Cuneo	0	1	1	Q
10	Li Yaofeng (CHN)	Jericho Dwerse Hagen	0	2	2	Q
10	Ali Al-Kharafi (KUW)	I	0	2	2	Q
12	Ahmad Hamcho (SYR)	Vintadge De La Roque	0	3	3	Q
13	Chen Yu-Lung (TPE)	Gaen	4	0	4	Q
13	Patrick Lam (HKG)	Lopez One	4	0	4	Q
13	Bassem Hassan Mohammed (QAT)	Incredible W	4	0	4	
13	Ramzy Al-Duhami (KSA)	Untouchable 32	4	0	4	
13	Lai Jacqueline Jing-Man (HKG)	I'm Special	4	0	4	Q
13	Taizo Sugitani (JPN)	Quincy 194	4	0	4	Q
13	Janakabhorn Karunayadhaj (THA)	Maxwin Kinmar Agalux	4	0	4	Q
13	Khurshidbek Alimdjanov (UZB)	Champion League	4	0	4	Q
21	Hsieh Ping-Yang (TPE)	Nerio De La Haute Bruyeres	4	1	5	Q
21	Abdulla Al-Marri (UAE)	James V.D Oude Heihoef	4	1	5	Q
23	Chew Yen Tung (SGP)	Holanda VDL	4	2	6	Q
24	Yash Nensee (IND)	D A Mour Du Wenuphar	4	3	7	Q
25	Jung Chul-Hee (KOR)	Monte Pleasure	8	0	8	Q
25	Bekzod Kurbanov (UZB)	Santos Hippica	8	0	8	Q
25	Clarissa de Lyra (HKG)	Guardiola - N	8	0	8	
28	Wang Yunjing (CHN)	Hoselinde	8	1	9	
28	Omid Gharibighahareh (IRI)	Kabisto	8	1	9	Q
30	Mohamed Al-Hajri (UAE)	GS Fabian	4	7	11	
31	Abdullah Al-Awadhi (KUW)	I Cantou Du Fonds Des Flo	12	0	12	
31	Lin Tzu-Yen (TPE)	Feeling Lucky	12	0	12	
31	Bakhromjon Gaziev (UZB)	Lady	12	0	12	
34	Masoud Mokarinezhad (IRI)	Gringo	12	1	13	
35	Annaz Al-Annaz (KUW)	Carlsson 69	12	3	15	
36	Yuko Itakura (JPN)	Stakkatisa PS	14	4	18	
36	Brayen Nathan Brata-Coolen (INA)	Aragon Castello H	16	2	18	
-	Lim Sung-Ro (KOR)	Cassido GZ	EL			
-	Heo Jeong-hoon (KOR)	Karisto Van De Mishagen	EL			

=== Final round 2 ===
Rank	Athlete	Horse	Penalties			Time	Notes
Rank	Athlete	Horse	Jump	Time	Total	Time	Notes
1	Abdullah Al-Sharbatly (KSA)	Skorphults Baloutendro	0	0	0	75.14	Jump Off
1	Omar Al-Jneibi (UAE)	Dalida Van De Zuuthoeve	0	0	0	78.34	Jump Off
1	Abdulla Al-Marri (UAE)	James V.D Oude Heihoef	0	0	0	78.83	Jump Off
1	Janakabhorn Karunayadhaj (THA)	Maxwin Kinmar Agalux	0	0	0	77.45	Jump Off
1	Ahmad Hamcho (SYR)	Vintadge De La Roque	0	0	0	79.29	Jump Off
6	Chen Yuchen (CHN)	Gaga E D'Auguyijn	0	2	2	81.37	
7	Abdulrahman Bader Al-Rajhi (KSA)	Ventago	4	0	4	76.06	
8	Taizo Sugitani (JPN)	Quincy 194	4	0	4	76.41	
9	Faleh Al-Ajami (QAT)	Ghana	4	0	4	78.50	
10	Rashid Al-Marri (QAT)	Concordess Nrw	4	0	4	78.51	
11	Ali Al-Kharafi (KUW)	I	4	0	4	79.18	
12	Nageswaran Shoorendran (MAS)	Wanskjaer Cuneo	4	2	6	81.47	
13	Naghmeh Khanjani (IRI)	Take A Chance Vande Brae	4	2	6	81.92	
14	Ahmad Saber Hamcho (SYR)	Vintadge De La Roque	8	0	8	75.83	
15	Lai Jacqueline Jing-Man (HKG)	I'm Special	8	0	8	76.69	
16	Bekzod Kurbanov (UZB)	Santos Hippica	8	0	8	76.79	
17	Li Yaofeng (CHN)	Jericho Dwerse Hagen	4	5	9	84.89	
18	Chen Yu-Lung (TPE)	Gaen	8	4	12	83.75	
19	Khurshidbek Alimdjanov (UZB)	Champion League	12	1	13	80.07	
20	Chew Yen Tung (SGP)	Holanda VDL	12	1	13	80.97	
21	Omid Gharibighahareh (IRI)	Kabisto	12	7	19	86.96	
22	Jung Chul-Hee (KOR)	Monte Pleasure	20	3	23	82.45	
23	Patrick Lam (HKG)	Ventago	12	13	25	92.93	
24	Hsieh Ping-Yang (TPE)	Nerio De La Haute Bruyeres	4	25	29	104.44	
-	Yash Nensee (IND)	D A Mour Du Wenuphar	EL				

=== Jump Off ===
Rank	Athlete	Horse	Penalties	Time
1st place, gold medalist(s)	Abdullah Al-Sharbatly (KSA)	Skorphults Baloutendro	0	39.68
2nd place, silver medalist(s)	Omar Al-Jneibi (UAE)	Dalida Van De Zuuthoeve	0	42.31
3rd place, bronze medalist(s)	Abdulla Al-Marri (UAE)	James V.D Oude Heihoef	0	42.45
4	Janakabhorn Karunayadhaj (THA)	Maxwin Kinmar Agalux	4	39.90
5	Ahmad Hamcho (SYR)	Vintadge De La Roque	4	50.97
