= Equestrian events at the 2026 Asian Games =

- Venue: Tokyo Equestrian Park
- Location: Tokyo, Japan
- Dates: 21 September – 4 October
- Competitors: 135 from 22 nations

The equestrian events at the 2026 Asian Games is being held between 21 September and 4 October 2026 at Tokyo Equestrian Park. There are three equestrian disciplines: dressage, eventing and jumping. All three disciplines are further divided into individual and team contests for a total of seven events.

== Schedule ==
The schedule is as follows:

| ● | Round | ● | Last round | Q | Qualification | F | Final |

| Event↓/Date → | 21st Mon | 22nd Tue | 23rd Wed | 24th Thu | 25th Fri | 26th Sat | 27th Sun | 28th Mon | 29th Tue | 30th Wed | 1st Thu | 2nd Fri | 3rd Sat | 4th Sun |
|---|---|---|---|---|---|---|---|---|---|---|---|---|---|---|
| Individual dressage | | | | | Q | Q | F | | | | | | | |
| Team dressage | | | | | F | | | | | | | | | |
| Individual eventing | ● | ● | ● | | | | | | | | | | | |
| Team eventing | ● | ● | ● | | | | | | | | | | | |
| Individual jumping A | | | | | | | | | | | | | Q | F |
| Individual jumping B | | | | | | | | | | | | | Q | F |
| Team jumping | | | | | | | | | | | F | | | |

== Medal table ==
* Host nation (Japan)

| Rank | Nation | Gold | Silver | Bronze | Total |
|---|---|---|---|---|---|
| 1 | China | 2 | 1 | 1 | 4 |
| 1 | Saudi Arabia | 2 | 1 | 1 | 4 |
| 3 | South Korea | 1 | 1 | 1 | 3 |
| 4 | Thailand | 1 | 1 | 0 | 2 |
| 5 | Qatar | 1 | 0 | 1 | 2 |
| 6 | United Arab Emirates | 0 | 2 | 0 | 2 |
| 7 | Japan* | 0 | 1 | 3 | 4 |
| Totals (7 entries) | | 7 | 7 | 7 | 21 |

== Medalists ==
| Event | Gold | Silver | Bronze |
|---|---|---|---|
| Individual dressage | Nam Dong-heon; South Korea | Yu Jiayi; China | Rao Jiayi; China |
| Team dressage | China; Rao Jiayi; Yu Jiayi; Gu Zhanzhao; Wu Yue | South Korea; Nam Dong-heon; Kim Shi-woo; Lee Myeong-seok; Do Hyun-woo | Japan; Shingo Hayashi; Ryuma Hieda; Akiko Yonemoto; Fumiyasu Nishiwaki |
| Individual eventing | Alex Hua Tian; China | Woraphat Sittiju; Thailand | Yoshiaki Oiwa; Japan |
| Team eventing | Thailand; Supap Khaw-Ngam; Woraphat Sittiju; Korntawat Samran; Weerapat Pitakanonda | Japan; Toshiyuki Tanaka; Ryo Murata; Kazuma Tomoto; Yoshiaki Oiwa | South Korea; Kang Han-su; Lee Dong-hwa; Kim Hyeong-ho; Park Heung-su |
| Individual jumping A | Faleh Al Ajami; Qatar | Abdulla Al Mheiri; United Arab Emirates | Khaled Al-Mobty; Saudi Arabia |
| Individual jumping B | Ramzy Al-Duhami; Saudi Arabia | Abdulrahman Alrajhi; Saudi Arabia | Bassem Mohammed; Qatar |
| Team jumping | Saudi Arabia; Saad Al-Ajmi; Ramzy Al-Duhami; Khaled Al-Mobty; Abdulrahman Al-Rajhi | United Arab Emirates; Latifa Al-Makhtoum; Omar Al-Marzooq; Abdulla Al-Mheiri; Humaid Al-Mheiri | Japan; Koki Saito; Eiken Sato; Taizo Sugitani |

== Participating nations ==
- Bahrain (3)
- China (8)
- Chinese Taipei (8)
- Hong Kong (12)
- India (8)
- Indonesia (12)
- Iran (2)
- Japan (12) (host)
- Jordan (3)
- Kazakhstan (4)
- Kuwait (4)
- Lebanon (1)
- Malaysia (2)
- Pakistan (1)
- Palestine (2)
- Philippines (2)
- Qatar (10)
- Saudi Arabia (7)
- South Korea (12)
- Thailand (9)
- United Arab Emirates (8)
- Uzbekistan (5)
