= Equestrian at the 2010 Asian Games – Team jumping =

Team jumping at the 2010 Asian Games
- Venue: Guangzhou Equestrian Venue
- Date: 22 November 2010
- Competitors: 32 from 8 nations

Medalists
gold medal	Saudi Arabia; Ramzy Al-Duhami, Khaled Al-Eid, Abdullah Al-Saud, Abdullah Al-Sharbatly
silver medal	United Arab Emirates; Latifa Al-Maktoum, Majid Al-Qassimi, Ahmed Al-Junaibi, Rashid Al-Maktoum
bronze medal	Hong Kong; Kenneth Cheng, Patrick Lam, Samantha Lam, Jacqueline Lai

Team jumping equestrian at the 2010 Asian Games was held in Guangzhou Equestrian Venue, Guangzhou, China on November 22, 2010.

== Schedule ==
All times are China Standard Time (UTC+08:00)

Date	Time	Event
Monday, 22 November 2010	09:00	1st round
Monday, 22 November 2010	14:00	2nd round

== Results ==
Legend

- EL — Eliminated
- WD — Withdrawn

Rank	Team	Round		Total	Jump-off	
Rank	Team	1st	2nd	Total	Pen.	Time
1st place, gold medalist(s)	Saudi Arabia (KSA)	0	4	4		
	Ramzy Al-Duhami on Bayard v Devilla T.	0	0			
	Khaled Al-Eid on Presley Boy	0	0			
	Abdullah Al-Saud on Mobily A. Obelix	0	~~8~~			
	Abdullah Al-Sharbatly on Melodie Ardente	~~0~~	4			
2nd place, silver medalist(s)	United Arab Emirates (UAE)	3	8	11	5	141.23
	Latifa Al-Maktoum on Kalaska de Semilly	3	0		4	45.66
	Majid Al-Qassimi on Co-Jack	0	~~8~~		0	47.14
	Ahmed Al-Junaibi on Picobello Wodiena	0	4		~~WD~~	
	Rashid Al-Maktoum on Dubai's Pride	~~8~~	4		1	48.43
3rd place, bronze medalist(s)	Hong Kong (HKG)	6	5	11	24	137.85
	Kenneth Cheng on JC Can Do	0	0		~~WD~~	
	Patrick Lam on JC Tilburg	4	1		4	45.07
	Samantha Lam on JC Crunship	~~17~~	4		16	47.72
	Jacqueline Lai on Capone 22	2	~~8~~		4	45.06
4	Qatar (QAT)	9	12	21		
	Ali Al-Thani on Dukhan	0	0			
	Ali Al-Rumaihi on Ambiente 55	8	4			
	Mubarak Al-Rumaihi on Castiglione L	1	8			
	Faleh Al-Ajami on Logo 28	~~EL~~	~~WD~~			
5	South Korea (KOR)	5	19	24		
	Heo Jun-sung on Sun Fire 2	0	9			
	Sohn Bong-gak on Centurio 25	0	0			
	Kim Seok on Lido des Broches	~~22~~	~~13~~			
	Kim Sung-whan on Qualitia Vande Groene	5	10			
6	China (CHN)	18	26	44		
	Chen Jingchuan on Coertis	11	9			
	Li Zhenqiang on Thunder Bolt	2	13			
	Zhang Bin on Heraldo	5	4			
	Nulahemaiti Abai on Lauxley de Breve	~~EL~~	~~EL~~			
7	Japan (JPN)	31	16	47		
	Satoshi Hirao on Udaryllis	9	12			
	Atsushi Katayama on Asterix	18	~~13~~			
	Daisuke Mizuyama on Off the Road	4	0			
	Reiko Takeda on Ticannaf	~~18~~	4			
8	Chinese Taipei (TPE)	50	18	68		
	Joy Chen on Platini VDL	0	9			
	Jasmine Chen on Quin Chin	0	4			
	Wong I-sheau on Item de Quintin	~~EL~~	5			
	Lu Ting-hsuan on Cobos	50	~~11~~			
