= Equestrian at the 2026 Asian Games – Team jumping =

Team jumping at the 2026 Asian Games
- Venue: Equestrian Park
- Dates: 1 October 2026
- Competitors: 38 from 10 nations

Medalists
| gold medal | Saudi Arabia; Saad Al-Ajmi, Ramzy Al-Duhami, Khaled Al-Mobty, Abdulrahman Bader Al-Rajhi |
| silver medal | United Arab Emirates; Latifa Al-Maktoum, Omar Al-Jneibi, Abdulla Al-Mheiri, Humaid Al-Mheiri |
| bronze medal | Japan; Koki Saito, Eiken Sato, Taizo Sugitani |

The team jumping competition in equestrian at the 2026 Asian Games was held at the Equestrian Park in Tokyo, Japan, on 1 October 2026. Held over two rounds at a height of 145 cm, the best three scores of each team's four combinations counted towards the team total.

== Schedule ==
All times are Japan Standard Time (UTC+09:00)

| Date | Time | Round |
|---|---|---|
| Thursday, 1 October 2026 | 09:30 | 1st Round |
| Thursday, 1 October 2026 | 13:05 | 2nd Round |

== Results ==
Legend

- EL — Eliminated
- RT — Retired
- WD — Withdrawn
- ~~Score~~ — Score not counting towards the team total

=== Round 1 ===
| Rank | Team | Penalties | | Total |
| Rank | Team | Jump | Time | Total |
|---|---|---|---|---|
| 1 | United Arab Emirates (UAE) | 0 | 0 | 0 |
| | Latifa Al-Maktoum on Cornet XL | ~~4~~ | ~~0~~ | ~~4~~ |
| | Humaid Al-Mheiri on Mentos | 0 | 0 | 0 |
| | Abdulla Al-Mheiri on Hudson de Vains | 0 | 0 | 0 |
| | Omar Al-Jneibi on Enjoy de la Mure | 0 | 0 | 0 |
| 1 | Saudi Arabia (KSA) | 0 | 0 | 0 |
| | Abdulrahman Bader Al-Rajhi on Lorenzo ES | 0 | 0 | 0 |
| | Saad Al-Ajmi on Davenport | 0 | 0 | 0 |
| | Khaled Al-Mobty on Diana du Plevau Z | ~~8~~ | ~~1~~ | ~~9~~ |
| | Ramzy Al-Duhami on Untouchable 32 | 0 | 0 | 0 |
| 3 | Japan (JPN) | 0 | 4 | 4 |
| | Taizo Sugitani on Quincy 194 | 0 | 0 | 0 |
| | Koki Saito on Elliot de Gineau | 4 | 0 | 4 |
| | Eiken Sato on Chadellano | 0 | 0 | 0 |
| 4 | Qatar (QAT) | 0 | 5 | 5 |
| | Ali Al-Thani on Marco Monet | 0 | 1 | 1 |
| | Faleh Al-Ajami on Qapella | 4 | 0 | 4 |
| | Fahad Al-Thani on Megalon K | ~~4~~ | ~~0~~ | ~~4~~ |
| | Bassem Hassan Mohammed on Chaccball | 0 | 0 | 0 |
| 5 | Kuwait (KUW) | 3 | 5 | 8 |
| | Fawaz Rashed on Little Joe van het Indihof | ~~8~~ | ~~3~~ | ~~11~~ |
| | Annaz Al-Annaz on Carlsson 69 | 4 | 0 | 4 |
| | Hussain Al-Kharafi on GK C'est Un Reve | 0 | 0 | 0 |
| | Ali Al-Kharafi on Inshallah | 4 | 0 | 4 |
| 6 | Chinese Taipei (TPE) | 10 | 8 | 18 |
| | Chen Hung-Shen on Gaen | 4 | 2 | 6 |
| | Wang Chong-Hao on Ivanhoe GPH | 4 | 0 | 4 |
| | Lin Yun-Chi on Driss de Kerglenn | 8 | 0 | 8 |
| 7 | Indonesia (INA) | 32 | 1 | 33 |
| | Dirga Wira Ramadan Sahputra on Bella PS | EL | | |
| | Rahman Setiawan on Balthargos PS | 12 | 1 | 13 |
| | Marco Hence Wowiling on Heliodor de Vains | 8 | 0 | 8 |
| | Arserl Rizki Brayudha on Cavallo PB Z | 12 | 0 | 12 |
| 8 | Hong Kong (HKG) | 28 | 6 | 34 |
| | Lai Jacqueline Jing-Man on Kalina's Way | ~~8~~ | ~~16~~ | ~~24~~ |
| | Clarissa de Lyra on Air Pilot | 12 | 0 | 12 |
| | Sheikara Lalive d'Epinay on Dakota | 12 | 6 | 18 |
| | Patrick Lam on Lopez One | 4 | 0 | 4 |
| 9 | Kazakhstan (KAZ) | 36 | 1 | 37 |
| | Xeniya Batalova on Lady Di | 16 | 1 | 17 |
| | Oleg Sokolenko on Cinderella | 12 | 0 | 12 |
| | Nurila Turisbekova on Quibelle van d'Abelendreef | ~~16~~ | ~~4~~ | ~~20~~ |
| | Raissa Sokolenko on Uran - Nad Wigrami | 8 | 0 | 8 |
| 10 | South Korea (KOR) | 48 | 1 | 49 |
| | Heo Jeong-hoon on Karisto van de Mishagen | 20 | 0 | 20 |
| | Lee Hyeong-yu on Eole du Guerpre | 28 | 1 | 29 |
| | Kwon Man-jun on Casanova of Picobello Z | EL | | |
| | Jung Chul-Hee on Zensational | 0 | 0 | 0 |

=== Round 2 ===
| Rank | Team | Round 1 | Penalties | | Total Time | Total |
| Rank | Team | Round 1 | Jump | Time | Total Time | Total |
|---|---|---|---|---|---|---|
| 1 | Saudi Arabia (KSA) | 0 | 0 | 0 | 225.36 | 0 |
| | Abdulrahman Bader Al-Rajhi on Lorenzo ES | 0 | 0 | 0 | | |
| | Saad Al-Ajmi on Davenport | 0 | ~~4~~ | ~~4~~ | | |
| | Khaled Al-Mobty on Diana du Plevau Z | ~~9~~ | 0 | 0 | | |
| | Ramzy Al-Duhami on Untouchable 32 | 0 | 0 | 0 | | |
| 2 | United Arab Emirates (UAE) | 0 | 4 | 0 | 218.77 | 4 |
| | Latifa Al-Maktoum on Cornet XL | ~~4~~ | 0 | 0 | | |
| | Humaid Al-Mheiri on Mentos | 0 | 0 | 0 | | |
| | Abdulla Al-Mheiri on Hudson de Vains | 0 | 4 | 0 | | |
| | Omar Al-Jneibi on Enjoy de la Mure | 0 | ~~4~~ | ~~0~~ | | |
| 3 | Japan (JPN) | 4 | 0 | 0 | 226.12 | 4 |
| | Taizo Sugitani on Quincy 194 | 0 | 0 | 0 | | |
| | Koki Saito on Elliot de Gineau | 4 | 0 | 0 | | |
| | Eiken Sato on Chadellano | 0 | 0 | 0 | | |
| 4 | Qatar (QAT) | 5 | 0 | 0 | 220.43 | 5 |
| | Ali Al-Thani on Marco Monet | 1 | 0 | 0 | | |
| | Faleh Al-Ajami on Qapella | 4 | 0 | 0 | | |
| | Fahad Al-Thani on Megalon K | ~~4~~ | 0 | 0 | | |
| | Bassem Hassan Mohammed on Chaccball | 0 | WD | | | |
| 5 | Kuwait (KUW) | 8 | 8 | 0 | 226.78 | 32 |
| | Fawaz Rashed on Little Joe van het Indihof | ~~11~~ | 8 | 0 | | |
| | Annaz Al-Annaz on Carlsson 69 | 4 | 12 | 0 | | |
| | Hussain Al-Kharafi on GK C'est Un Reve | 0 | 4 | 0 | | |
| | Ali Al-Kharafi on Inshallah | 4 | WD | | | |
| 6 | Chinese Taipei (TPE) | 18 | 4 | 15 | 238.40 | 37 |
| | Chen Hung-Shen on Gaen | 6 | 4 | 0 | | |
| | Wang Chong-Hao on Ivanhoe GPH | 4 | 4 | 6 | | |
| | Lin Yun-Chi on Driss de Kerglenn | 8 | 4 | 1 | | |
| 7 | Indonesia (INA) | 33 | 16 | 20 | 225.35 | 69 |
| | Dirga Wira Ramadan Sahputra on Bella PS | ~~EL~~ | ~~16~~ | ~~0~~ | | |
| | Rahman Setiawan on Balthargos PS | 13 | 16 | 0 | | |
| | Marco Hence Wowiling on Heliodor de Vains | 8 | 12 | 0 | | |
| | Arserl Rizki Brayudha on Cavallo PB Z | 12 | 8 | 0 | | |
| 8 | Hong Kong (HKG) | 34 | 32 | 4 | 226.46 | 70 |
| | Lai Jacqueline Jing-Man on Kalina's Way | ~~24~~ | 4 | 0 | | |
| | Clarissa de Lyra on Air Pilot | 12 | 8 | 0 | | |
| | Sheikara Lalive d'Epinay on Dakota | 18 | RT | | | |
| | Patrick Lam on Lopez One | 4 | 24 | 0 | | |
| — | Kazakhstan (KAZ) | 37 | EL | | | |
| | Xeniya Batalova on Lady Di | 17 | EL | | | |
| | Oleg Sokolenko on Cinderella | 12 | 8 | 0 | | |
| | Nurila Turisbekova on Quibelle van d'Abelendreef | ~~20~~ | EL | | | |
| | Raissa Sokolenko on Uran - Nad Wigrami | 8 | WD | | | |
| — | South Korea (KOR) | 49 | EL | | | |
| | Heo Jeong-hoon on Karisto van de Mishagen | 20 | WD | | | |
| | Lee Hyeong-yu on Eole du Guerpre | 29 | EL | | | |
| | Kwon Man-jun on Casanova of Picobello Z | ~~EL~~ | WD | | | |
| | Jung Chul-Hee on Zensational | 0 | WD | | | |

== External Link ==
- Reports
