= Equestrian at the 2026 Asian Games – Individual jumping =

Individual jumping A at the 2026 Asian Games
- Venue: Equestrian Park
- Dates: 3–4 October 2026
- Competitors: 29 from 14 nations

Medalists
gold medal	Faleh Al-Ajami	Qatar
silver medal	Abdulla Al-Mheiri	United Arab Emirates
bronze medal	Khaled Al-Mobty	Saudi Arabia

Individual jumping B at the 2026 Asian Games
- Venue: Equestrian Park
- Dates: 3–4 October 2026
- Competitors: 16 from 10 nations

Medalists
gold medal	Ramzy Al-Duhami	Saudi Arabia
silver medal	Abdulrahman Bader Al-Rajhi	Saudi Arabia
bronze medal	Bassem Hassan Mohammed	Qatar

The individual jumping competition in equestrian at the 2026 Asian Games was held at the Equestrian Park in Tokyo, Japan, on 3 and 4 October 2026. The competition was divided into two separate events, A and B, each run over two rounds with the best two combinations per NOC from the first round advancing to the second, and each awarding its own set of medals.

Jumping A was run at a height of 1.45–1.50 metres. Three combinations tied on zero penalties after the two rounds and contested a jump-off, in which Faleh Al-Ajami took gold on time. Jumping B was run at a height of up to 1.55 metres, and in its jump-off Ramzy Al-Duhami and Untouchable 32 produced the only clear round to take gold.

== Schedule ==
All times are Japan Standard Time (UTC+09:00)

Date	Time	Group	Round
Saturday, 3 October 2026	09:30	A	1st Round
Saturday, 3 October 2026	13:40	B	1st Round
Sunday, 4 October 2026	09:30	A	2nd Round
Sunday, 4 October 2026		A	Jump-off
Sunday, 4 October 2026	11:45	B	2nd Round
Sunday, 4 October 2026		B	Jump-off

== Results ==
Legend

- EL — Eliminated
- RT — Retired
- WD — Withdrawn

=== Individual jumping A ===
Rank	Athlete	Horse	Round 1			Round 2			Total
Rank	Athlete	Horse	Jump	Time	Total	Jump	Time	Total	Total
1	Faleh Al-Ajami (QAT)	Qapella	0	0	0	0	0	0	0
2	Abdulla Al-Mheiri (UAE)	Hudson de Vains	0	0	0	0	0	0	0
3	Khaled Al-Mobty (KSA)	Diana du Plevau Z	0	0	0	0	0	0	0
4	Humaid Al-Mheiri (UAE)	Mentos	0	0	0	4	0	4	4
5	Chen Hung-Shen (TPE)	Gaen	4	0	4	0	0	0	4
6	Nageswaran Shoorendran (MAS)	Limelight AD	4	0	4	0	2	2	6
7	Chen Yu-Lung (TPE)	Shanroe Barney	4	0	4	4	0	4	8
8	Lai Jacqueline Jing-Man (HKG)	Kalina's Way	0	0	0	8	0	8	8
9	Colin Syquia (PHI)	Hocus Pocus	0	2	2	4	3	7	9
10	Lee Hyeong-yu (KOR)	Eole du Guerpre	8	0	8	4	0	4	12
11	Rahman Setiawan (INA)	Balthargos PS	4	0	4	8	0	8	12
12	Arserl Rizki Brayudha (INA)	Cavallo PB Z	0	0	0	12	2	14	14
13	Fahad Al-Thani (QAT)	Megalon K	8	0	8	8	1	9	17
14	Oleg Sokolenko (KAZ)	Cinderella	16	0	16	4	0	4	20
15	Clarissa de Lyra (HKG)	Air Pilot	12	0	12	16	5	21	33
—	Saad Al-Ajmi (KSA)	Davenport	0	0	0	RT			
—	Hussain Al-Kharafi (KUW)	GK C'est Un Reve	8	0	8	RT			
—	Koki Saito (JPN)	Elliot de Gineau	8	0	8	WD			
—	Nurila Turisbekova (KAZ)	Quibelle van d'Abelendreef	12	3	15	RT			
—	Faezeh Gharavi (IRI)	Indigo	12	26	38	EL			
—	Wang Chong-Hao (TPE)	Ivanhoe GPH	8	0	8	—			
—	Dirga Wira Ramadan Sahputra (INA)	Bella PS	8	0	8	—			
—	Raissa Sokolenko (KAZ)	Uran - Nad Wigrami	12	3	15	—			
—	Marco Hence Wowiling (INA)	Heliodor de Vains	24	0	24	—			
—	Xeniya Batalova (KAZ)	Lady Di	EL						
—	Bakhromjon Gaziev (UZB)	Santos Hippica	EL						
—	Annaz Al-Annaz (KUW)	Carlsson 69	EL						
—	Heo Jeong-hoon (KOR)	Karisto van de Mishagen	EL						
—	Kwon Man-jun (KOR)	Casanova of Picobello Z	WD						

==== Jump-off ====
Rank	Athlete	Horse	Penalties	Time
1st place, gold medalist(s)	Faleh Al-Ajami (QAT)	Qapella	4	40.88
2nd place, silver medalist(s)	Abdulla Al-Mheiri (UAE)	Hudson de Vains	4	41.93
3rd place, bronze medalist(s)	Khaled Al-Mobty (KSA)	Diana du Plevau Z	4	45.35

=== Individual jumping B ===
Rank	Athlete	Horse	Round 1			Round 2			Total
Rank	Athlete	Horse	Jump	Time	Total	Jump	Time	Total	Total
1	Ramzy Al-Duhami (KSA)	Untouchable 32	0	0	0	0	0	0	0
2	Abdulrahman Bader Al-Rajhi (KSA)	Lorenzo ES	0	0	0	0	0	0	0
3	Bassem Hassan Mohammed (QAT)	Chaccball	0	0	0	0	0	0	0
4	Eiken Sato (JPN)	Chadellano	0	1	1	0	0	0	1
5	Ali Al-Kharafi (KUW)	Inshallah	0	0	0	0	1	1	1
6	Omar Al-Jneibi (UAE)	Enjoy de la Mure	4	0	4	0	0	0	4
7	Latifa Al-Maktoum (UAE)	Cornet XL	0	0	0	8	0	8	8
8	Lin Yun-Chi (TPE)	Driss de Kerglenn	4	1	5	8	4	12	17
9	Bekzod Kurbanov (UZB)	Matts V.G.	8	0	8	8	2	10	18
10	Taizo Sugitani (JPN)	Quincy 194	12	0	12	8	0	8	20
11	Patrick Lam (HKG)	Lopez One	8	3	11	12	0	12	23
12	Raad Naser (JOR)	Esforzado Tilly Z	12	1	13	8	5	13	26
13	Fawaz Rashed (KUW)	Little Joe van het Indihof	12	2	14	12	4	16	30
14	Jung Chul-Hee (KOR)	Zensational	8	15	23	4	5	9	32
—	Ibrahim Bisharat (JOR)	Happyness	8	0	8	RT			
—	Ali Al-Thani (QAT)	Marco Monet	RT						

==== Jump-off ====
Rank	Athlete	Horse	Penalties	Time
1st place, gold medalist(s)	Ramzy Al-Duhami (KSA)	Untouchable 32	0	42.59
2nd place, silver medalist(s)	Abdulrahman Bader Al-Rajhi (KSA)	Lorenzo ES	8	39.73
3rd place, bronze medalist(s)	Bassem Hassan Mohammed (QAT)	Chaccball	8	43.26

== External Link ==
- Reports
