= Equestrian at the 2014 Asian Games – Team jumping =

Team jumping at the 2014 Asian Games
- Venue: Incheon Dream Park
- Date: 28 September 2014
- Competitors: 38 from 10 nations

Medalists
gold medal	Qatar; Nasser Al-Ghazali, Ali Al-Thani, Khalid Al-Emadi, Bassem Hassan Mohammed
silver medal	Saudi Arabia; Faisal Al-Shalan, Abdulrahman Al-Rajhi, Salman Al-Maqadi, Abdullah Al-Sharbatly
bronze medal	Japan; Satoshi Hirao, Takashi Utsunomiya, Tadahiro Hayashi, Taizo Sugitani

Team jumping equestrian at the 2014 Asian Games was held in Dream Park Equestrian Venue, Incheon, South Korea on September 28, 2014.

== Schedule ==
All times are Korea Standard Time (UTC+09:00)

Date	Time	Event
Sunday, 28 September 2014	09:00	1st round
Sunday, 28 September 2014	13:00	2nd round

== Results ==
Legend

- EL — Eliminated
- WD — Withdrawn

Rank	Team	Round		Total	Jump-off	
Rank	Team	1st	2nd	Total	Pen.	Time
1st place, gold medalist(s)	Qatar (QAT)	0	0	0		
	Nasser Al-Ghazali on Delloren	0	0			
	Ali Al-Thani on Vinna Olympic	0	0			
	Khalid Al-Emadi on Tamira IV	0	0			
	Bassem Hassan Mohammed on Anyway II	~~1~~	~~2~~			
2nd place, silver medalist(s)	Saudi Arabia (KSA)	0	4	4		
	Faisal Al-Shalan on Talan	0	0			
	Abdulrahman Al-Rajhi on New Orleans	0	~~12~~			
	Salman Al-Maqadi on Senorita	0	0			
	Abdullah Al-Sharbatly on Callahan	~~1~~	4			
3rd place, bronze medalist(s)	Japan (JPN)	4	8	12		
	Satoshi Hirao on Ulano	0	4			
	Takashi Utsunomiya on Touche Pas A Rivereuille	4	~~8~~			
	Tadahiro Hayashi on Loretto Classic	~~4~~	4			
	Taizo Sugitani on Avenzio 3	0	0			
4	United Arab Emirates (UAE)	9	5	14		
	Abdullah Al-Marri on Sierra Antika Joter	5	4			
	Mohamed Al-Owais on Et is wie es is KJ	0	1			
	Moftah Al-Dhaheri on Al-Yamamah	~~6~~	~~8~~			
	Latifa Al-Maktoum on Peanuts de Beaufour	4	0			
5	Philippines (PHI)	2	15	17		
	Diego Lorenzo on HS Contino	1	5			
	Joker Arroyo on Didi de Goedereede	0	~~9~~			
	Toni Leviste on Maximillian	1	5			
	Mateo Lorenzo on Carlie 3	~~13~~	5			
6	Hong Kong (HKG)	11	11	22		
	Kenneth Cheng on Jockey Club Caballo	~~8~~	~~EL~~			
	Samantha Lam on Adonis	5	4			
	Raena Leung on Lalik 2	5	5			
	Jacqueline Lai on Capone 22	1	2			
7	Chinese Taipei (TPE)	8	19	27		
	Wong I-sheau on Zadarijke V	0	4			
	Lan Yu-chun on Chin Win	~~8~~	~~17~~			
	Huang Po-hsiang on MCB Cassilia	7	3			
	Lu Ting-hsuan on Cobos	1	12			
8	South Korea (KOR)	19	12	31		
	Jun Jae-hee on Una Traviatta	1	6			
	Oh Sung-hwan on Chintan	18	2			
	Kim Seok on Lido des Broches	0	4			
	Heo Jun-sung on Sun Fire 2	~~EL~~	~~WD~~			
—	Thailand (THA)	40	EL	EL		
	Alex Davis on Voloma	9	EL			
	Sailub Lertratanachai on Vrauke W	8	5			
	Siengsaw Lertratanachai on Dakota	23	24			
—	India (IND)	EL		EL		
	Yashaan Zubin Khambatta on Olgy	9				
	Sehaj Singh Virk on Laila Lordanos	EL				
	Ashray Butta on Allegro	WD				
