= Equestrian at the 2022 Asian Games – Team jumping =

Team jumping at the 2022 Asian Games
- Venue: Tonglu Equestrian Centre
- Date: 4 October 2023
- Competitors: 45 from 12 nations

Medalists
gold medal	Saudi Arabia; Abdullah Al-Sharbatly, Meshal Alhumaidi Al-Harbi, Abdulrahman Al-Rajhi, Ramzy Al-Duhami
silver medal	Qatar; Faleh Suwead Al-Ajami, Rashid Towaim Ali Al -Marri, Khalifa Al-Thani, Bassem Hassan Mohammed
bronze medal	United Arab Emirates; Mohammed Ghanem Al-Hajri, Omar Al-Jneibi, Abdullah Mohd Al-Marri, Salim Ahmed Al-Suwaidi

Team jumping equestrian at the 2022 Asian Games was held in Tonglu Equestrian Centre, on 4 October 2023. Saudi Arabia won the team jumping gold medal, ahead of Qatar and the United Arab Emirates, with the Saudi team completing the competition without a penalty in the final.

== Schedule ==
All times are China Standard Time (UTC+08:00)

Date	Time	Event
Wednesday, 4 October 2023	09:00	Round 1
Wednesday, 4 October 2023	14:00	Round 2

== Results ==
Legend

- EL — Eliminated
- RT — Retired
- WD — Withdrawn

=== Round 1 ===
Rank	Team	Penalties		Total
Rank	Team	Jump	Time	Total
1	Saudi Arabia (KSA)	0	0	0
	Abdulrahman Bader Al-Rajhi on Ventago	0	0	0
	Meshari Alhumaidi Al-Harbi on Cascadello Boy RM	0	0	0
	Ramzy Al-Duhami on Untouchable 32	~~0~~	~~0~~	~~0~~
	Abdullah Al-Sharbatly on Skorphults Baloutendro	0	0	0
1	United Arab Emirates (UAE)	0	0	0
	Abdulla Al-Marri on James V.D Oude Heihoef	~~0~~	~~0~~	~~0~~
	Omar Al-Jneibi on Dalida Van De Zuuthoeve	0	0	0
	Salem Al-Suwaidi on Diamond Way	0	0	0
	Mohamed Al-Hajri on GS Fabian	0	0	0
1	Japan (JPN)	0	0	0
	Taizo Sugitani on Quincy 194	0	0	0
	Tomoki Koshidaka on Cortis De Nyze Z	~~4~~	~~0~~	~~4~~
	Mike Kawai on Goldway	0	0	0
	Yuko Itakura on Stakkatisa PS	0	0	0
1	Kuwait (KUW)	0	0	0
	Abdulrahman Al-Fuzae on Gijsbrand	0	0	0
	Annaz Al-Annaz on Carlsson 69	0	0	0
	Abdullah Al-Awadhi on I Cantou Du Fonds Des Flo	~~4~~	~~0~~	~~4~~
	Ali Al-Kharafi on I	0	0	0
1	Qatar (QAT)	0	0	0
	Faleh Al-Ajami on Ghana	0	0	0
	Khalifa Al-Thani on Ierland VDL	~~4~~	~~0~~	~~4~~
	Rashid Al-Marri on Concordess Nrw	0	0	0
	Bassem Hassan Mohammed on Incredible W	0	0	0
6	China (CHN)	0	1	1
	Li Yaofeng on Jericho Dwerse Hagen	0	1	1
	Chen Yuchen on Gaga E D'Auguyijn	0	0	0
	Wang Yunjing on Hoselinde	0	0	0
7	Uzbekistan (UZB)	12	0	12
	Bekzod Kurbanov on Santos Hippica	0	0	0
	Khurshidbek Alimdjanov on Champion League	0	0	0
	Umidjon Komilov on Ventago	12	0	12
	Bakhromjon Gaziev on Lady	~~12~~	~~0~~	~~12~~
7	South Korea (KOR)	12	0	12
	Lee Yo-Seb on Levado Van Het Molenrietven	4	0	4
	Heo Jeong-hoon on Karisto Van De Mishagen	0	0	0
	Lim Sung-Ro on Cassido GZ	~~8~~	~~0~~	~~8~~
	Jung Chul-Hee on Monte Pleasure	8	0	8
7	Chinese Taipei (TPE)	12	0	12
	Hsieh Ping-Yang on Nerio De La Haute Bruyeres	4	0	4
	Hsiao Yu-Cheng on S & L Exxon Hedonist	~~8~~	~~0~~	~~8~~
	Lin Tzu-Yen on Feeling Lucky	4	0	4
	Chen Yu-Lung on Gaen	4	0	4
10	Iran (IRI)	20	0	20
	Masoud Mokarinezhad on Gringo	4	0	4
	Omid Gharibighahareh on Kabisto	12	0	12
	Naghmeh Khanjani on Take A Chance Vande Brae	4	0	4
11	Hong Kong (HKG)	12	12	24
	Patrick Lam on Lopez One	12	12	24
	Ma Melinda Lin on Carblue	EL		
	Clarissa de Lyra on Guardiola - N	0	0	0
	Lai Jacqueline Jing-Man on I'm Special	0	0	0
-	India (IND)	EL		
	Yash Nensee on D A Mour Du Wenuphar	4	0	4
	Kirat Singh Nagra on Alvin B	EL		
	Tejas Dhingra on Stan KJ	EL		

=== Round 2 ===
Rank	Team	Round 1	Penalties		Total
Rank	Team	Round 1	Jump	Time	Total
1	Saudi Arabia (KSA)	0	0	0	0
	Abdulrahman Bader Al-Rajhi on Ventago	0	0	0	
	Meshari Alhumaidi Al-Harbi on Cascadello Boy RM	0	0	0	
	Ramzy Al-Duhami on Untouchable 32	~~0~~	~~0~~	~~0~~	
	Abdullah Al-Sharbatly on Skorphults Baloutendro	0	0	0	
1	Qatar (QAT)	0	0	0	0
	Faleh Al-Ajami on Ghana	0	0	0	
	Khalifa Al-Thani on Ierland VDL	~~4~~	~~4~~	~~0~~	
	Rashid Al-Marri on Concordess Nrw	0	0	0	
	Bassem Hassan Mohammed on Incredible W	0	0	0	
1	United Arab Emirates (UAE)	0	0	0	0
	Abdulla Al-Marri on James V.D Oude Heihoef	~~0~~	~~0~~	~~0~~	
	Omar Al-Jneibi on Dalida Van De Zuuthoeve	0	0	0	
	Salem Al-Suwaidi on Diamond Way	0	0	0	
	Mohamed Al-Hajri on GS Fabian	0	0	0	
4	Kuwait (KUW)	0	4	0	4
	Abdulrahman Al-Fuzae on Gijsbrand	0	~~20~~	~~20~~	
	Annaz Al-Annaz on Carlsson 69	0	0	0	
	Abdullah Al-Awadhi on I Cantou Du Fonds Des Flo	~~4~~	4	0	
	Ali Al-Kharafi on I	0	0	0	
5	China (CHN)	1	12	0	13
	Li Yaofeng on Jericho Dwerse Hagen	1	0	0	
	Chen Yuchen on Gaga E D'Auguyijn	0	4	0	
	Wang Yunjing on Hoselinde	0	8	0	
6	Japan (JPN)	0	12	12	24
	Taizo Sugitani on Quincy 194	0	0	0	
	Tomoki Koshidaka on Cortis De Nyze Z	~~4~~	EL		
	Mike Kawai on Goldway	0	12	12	
	Yuko Itakura on Stakkatisa PS	0	0	0	
7	Hong Kong (HKG)	24	8	0	32
	Patrick Lam on Lopez One	24	4	0	
	Ma Melinda Lin on Carblue	EL			
	Clarissa de Lyra on Guardiola - N	0	4	0	
	Lai Jacqueline Jing-Man on I'm Special	0	0	0	
7	Uzbekistan (UZB)	12	20	0	32
	Bekzod Kurbanov on Santos Hippica	0	8	0	
	Khurshidbek Alimdjanov on Champion League	0	8	0	
	Umidjon Komilov on Ventago	12	~~20~~	~~0~~	
	Bakhromjon Gaziev on Lady	~~12~~	4	0	
7	Chinese Taipei (TPE)	12	20	0	32
	Hsieh Ping-Yang on Nerio De La Haute Bruyeres	4	0	0	
	Hsiao Yu-Cheng on S & L Exxon Hedonist	~~8~~	~~8~~	~~25~~	
	Lin Tzu-Yen on Feeling Lucky	4	16	0	
	Chen Yu-Lung on Gaen	4	4	0	
10	South Korea (KOR)	12	24	0	36
	Lee Yo-Seb on Levado Van Het Molenrietven	4	~~8~~	~~7~~	
	Heo Jeong-hoon on Karisto Van De Mishagen	0	8	0	
	Lim Sung-Ro on Cassido GZ	~~8~~	8	0	
	Jung Chul-Hee on Monte Pleasure	8	8	0	
11	Iran (IRI)	20	20	0	40
	Masoud Mokarinezhad on Gringo	4	0	0	
	Omid Gharibighahareh on Kabisto	12	16	0	
	Naghmeh Khanjani on Take A Chance Vande Brae	4	4	0	

=== Jump Off ===
Rank	Team	Pen	Time
1st place, gold medalist(s)	Saudi Arabia (KSA)	0	111.83
	Abdulrahman Bader Al-Rajhi on Ventago	~~9~~	~~48.36~~
	Meshari Alhumaidi Al-Harbi on Cascadello Boy RM	0	36.42
	Ramzy Al-Duhami on Untouchable 32	0	37.80
	Abdullah Al-Sharbatly on Skorphults Baloutendro	0	37.61
2nd place, silver medalist(s)	Qatar (QAT)	4	117.94
	Faleh Al-Ajami on Ghana	0	39.85
	Khalifa Al-Thani on Ierland VDL	EL	
	Rashid Al-Marri on Concordess Nrw	0	38.44
	Bassem Hassan Mohammed on Incredible W	4	39.55
3rd place, bronze medalist(s)	United Arab Emirates (UAE)	12	120.58
	Abdulla Al-Marri on James V.D Oude Heihoef	4	41.75
	Omar Al-Jneibi on Dalida Van De Zuuthoeve	4	39.07
	Salem Al-Suwaidi on Diamond Way	4	39.76
	Mohamed Al-Hajri on GS Fabian	~~16~~	~~55.85~~
