= Equestrian at the 2011 Arab Games =

Equestrian at the 2011 Pan Arab Games
- Venue: Aspire Zone
- Location: Doha, Qatar
- Dates: 13–23 December

At the 2011 Pan Arab Games, the equestrian events were held at Aspire Zone in Doha, Qatar from 13 to 23 December. A total of 6 events were contested.

== Medal summary ==
=== Open ===
Event	Gold	Silver	Bronze
Individual Dressage.	Mohammed Al Marri (QAT)	Rashid Al Marri (QAT)	Farah Al Khojai (UAE)
Team Dressage	Qatar (QAT); Ahmed Al Badi; Abdulla Al Marri; MoHammed Al Marri; Rashid Al Marri	Lebanon (LIB); Georges Bitar; Malih Dana; Carla Kattouah	Iraq (IRQ); Nooruldeen Al Azzawi; Mustafa Al Hussaini; Ali Shbri
Individual Jumping	Ali Al-Rumaihi (QAT)	Kamal Bahamdan (KSA)	Prince Faisal Al Shalan (KSA)
Team Jumping	Saudi Arabia (KSA); Abdullah Al Saud; Prince Faisal Al Shalan; Khaled Al-Eid; Kamal Bahamdan	Qatar (QAT); Faleh Al Ajami; Ali Al-Rumaihi; Mubarak Al Rumaihi; Sheikh Ali Al Thani	Egypt (EGY); Nayel Nassar; Abdelkader Said; Ahmed Tolba
Individual Endurance	Yousef Alblooshi (UAE)	H.B. Al Maktoum (UAE)	Saeed Al Maamri (UAE)
Team Endurance	United Arab Emirates (UAE); H.B. Al Maktoum; Ali Khalfan Al Jahouri; Yousef Ahmed Alblooshi; Mohammed Ahmad Al Subose	Oman (OMA); Al Khalil Al Nairi; Khatar Al Maamari; Ibrahim Al Maqbali; Abdullah Al Siyabi	Vacant

== Medal table ==
* Host nation (Qatar)

Rank	Nation	Gold	Silver	Bronze	Total
1	Qatar*	3	1	1	5
2	United Arab Emirates	2	1	2	5
3	Saudi Arabia	1	1	1	3
4	Egypt	0	1	0	1
4	Lebanon	0	1	0	1
4	Oman	0	1	0	1
7	Iraq	0	0	1	1
Totals (7 entries)		6	6	5	17
