= Saudi Arabia at the 2014 Asian Games =

- IOC code: KSA
- NOC: Saudi Arabian Olympic Committee

in Incheon
- Flag bearer: Sultan Al-Hebshi
- Medals Ranked 19th: Gold 3 Silver 3 Bronze 1 Total 7

Asian Games appearances (overview)
- 1978; 1982; 1986; 1990; 1994; 1998; 2002; 2006; 2010; 2014; 2018; 2022; 2026

Saudi Arabia participated in the 2014 Asian Games in Incheon, South Korea from 19 September to 4 October 2014.

== Asian Games Performance ==
Saudi Arabia's delegation received backlash from Human Rights Watch after no woman made it to their roster of athletes. However, they were able to send 199 athletes to the Games.

Yousef Masrahi won gold in the men's 400 m, at a time of 44.46, an Asian Games record. Abdullah Waleed Sharbatly then won the individual jumping title as Saudi Arabia claimed their second gold medal of the Games. They then won their third gold medal courtesy of Sultan Abdulmajeed Al-Hebshi in the men's shot put. Overall, Saudi Arabia finished 19th overall in the standings with three golds, three silvers, and one bronze.

== Medal summary ==
=== Medalists ===
Medal	Name	Sport	Event
Gold	Yousef Ahmed Masrahi	Athletics	Men's 400 metres
Gold	Sultan Al-Hebshi	Athletics	Men's shot put
Gold	Abdullah Al-Sharbatly	Equestrian	Individual jumping
Silver	Fahhad Mohammed Al-Subaie	Athletics	Men's 200 metres
Silver	Faisal Al-Shalan; Abdulrahman Al-Rajhi; Salman Al-Maqadi; Abdullah Al-Sharbatly	Equestrian	Team jumping
Silver	Abdullah Al-Harbi	Karate	Men's kumite 55 kg
Bronze	Ismaeel Mohammed Al-Subiani; Ahmed Yahya Al-Khayri; Mohammed Ali Al-Bishi; Yousef Ahmed Masrahi	Athletics	Men's 4 × 400 metres relay

== Basketball ==
=== Group B ===
Team	Pld	W	L	PF	PA	PD	Pts	Tie
India	3	2	1	236	183	+53	5	1–1; 1.097
Kazakhstan	3	2	1	222	189	+33	5	1–1; 1.079
Saudi Arabia	3	2	1	211	227	−16	5	1–1; 0.846
Palestine	3	0	3	180	250	−70	3	

20 September
14:00

Boxscore

Saudi Arabia	59–89	Kazakhstan
Scoring by quarter: 17–15, 12–20, 17–25, 13–29
Pts: M. Al-Muwallad 19; Rebs: Al-Muwallad, Alhwsawi 5 Asts: Kabe 2		Pts: Kolesnikov 18; Rebs: Kolesnikov 13; Asts: Sultanov 3

Hwaseong Sports Complex, Hwaseong
Referees: Hwang Intae (KOR), Reza Azarafza (IRI), Chen Yu Huang (TPE)

21 September
16:15

Boxscore

India	67–73	Saudi Arabia
Scoring by quarter: 13–19, 14–21, 19–19, 21–14
Pts: Al. Singh, At. Singh 19; Rebs: Bhriguvanshi 11; Asts: Bhriguvanshi 8		Pts: Belal 17; Rebs: Almarwani 13; Asts: A. Al-Muwallad 6

Samsan World Gymnasium, Incheon
Referees: Liang Bin (CHN), Lei Si Man (MAC), Hsieh Wen Wei (TPE)

22 September
14:00

Boxscore

Palestine	71–89	Saudi Arabia
Scoring by quarter: 18–17, 22–17, 21–29, 10–26
Pts: Sakakini 26; Rebs: Sakakini 16; Asts: Sakakini 2		Pts: M. Al-Muwallad, Alsager 26; Rebs: Almarwani 11; Asts: four players 1

Hwaseong Sports Complex, Hwaseong
Referees: Harja Jaladri (INA), Fung Tat Hon Jimmy (HKG), Lee Kyounghwan (KOR)

== Football ==
=== Men ===
Preliminary

==== Group A ====
Pos	Team	Pld	W	D	L	GF	GA	GD	Pts
1	South Korea	3	3	0	0	6	0	+6	9
2	Saudi Arabia	3	2	0	1	6	1	+5	6
3	Malaysia	3	1	0	2	4	6	−2	3
4	Laos	3	0	0	3	0	9	−9	0

Source: RSSSF
September 14, 2014
14:00

Saudi Arabia	3–0	Laos
Al-Ghamdi 75' (pen.); Al-Shehri 86'; M. Kanabah 90+1'	Report

Incheon Munhak Stadium
Referee: Minoru Tōjō (Japan)
September 17, 2014
20:00

South Korea	1–0	Saudi Arabia
Kim Seung-dae 12'	Report

Ansan Wa~ Stadium
Referee: Ma Ning (China)

September 21, 2014
17:00

Malaysia	v	Saudi Arabia

Goyang Stadium

== Handball ==
=== Men ===
==== Group A ====
Pos	Team	Pld	W	D	L	GF	GA	GD	Pts	Qualification
1	Bahrain	2	2	0	0	83	34	+49	4	Main round
2	Saudi Arabia	2	1	0	1	71	38	+33	2	Main round
3	Mongolia	2	0	0	2	26	108	−82	0	Classification round 9–12

Source: Results

September 21; 10:00	Mongolia	–	Saudi Arabia	Seonhak Handball Gymnasium, Incheon

September 22; 12:00	Saudi Arabia	–	Bahrain	Seonhak Handball Gymnasium, Incheon

== Rugby Sevens ==
=== Men ===
Repechage

- Pakistan
- Lebanon
- Saudi Arabia

== Volleyball ==
=== Men ===
==== Pool B ====
Pos	Team	Pld	W	L	Pts	SW	SL	SR	SPW	SPL	SPR	Qualification
1	Japan	3	3	0	9	9	1	9.000	247	182	1.357	Play-off / Group E–F
2	Kuwait	3	2	1	6	7	3	2.333	224	224	1.000	Play-off / Group E–F
3	Saudi Arabia	3	1	2	3	3	6	0.500	184	210	0.876	Play-off / Group G–H
4	Pakistan	3	0	3	0	0	9	0.000	186	225	0.827	Play-off / Group G–H

Source: Results

Date	Time	Venue		Score		Set 1	Set 2	Set 3	Set 4	Set 5	Total	Report
21 Sep	15:30	ASG	Japan	–	Saudi Arabia							
22 Sep	14:00	SOG	Kuwait	–	Saudi Arabia							
26 Sep	17:30	ASG	Saudi Arabia	–	Pakistan							
