= Omar Al Marzouqi =

U.A.E. equestrian

Personal information
- Born: Omar Abdul Aziz Al Marzouqi; 28 March 2003 (age 23)
- Height: 170 cm (5 ft 7 in) (2018)
- Weight: 58 kg (128 lb) (2018)

Sport
- Country: United Arab Emirates
- Sport: Equestrian
Medal record
Equestrian
Representing United Arab Emirates
Asian Games
Silver medal – second place	2022 Hangzhou	Individual jumping
Bronze medal – third place	2022 Hangzhou	Team jumping
Youth Olympic Games
Silver medal – second place	2018 Buenos Aires	Individual jumping

Omar Abdul Aziz Al Marzouqi (Arabic: عمر عبدالعزيز المرزوقي, also transliterated Al Marzooqi, born 28 March 2003) is an equestrian who represents the United Arab Emirates.

== Early life ==
He was introduced to riding at a young age. His father was a show jumper who went on to train riders.

== Career ==
At the age of 15 years-old he won a silver medal at the 2018 Youth Olympics in Buenos Aires, Argentina.

At the 2022 Asian Games held in Hangzhou, China, Al Marzouqi won two medals in the show jumping, an individual silver and team bronze.

In May 2024, he won the CSI4* 1.55m Grand Prix title at the Montefalco Championship in Italy, riding Enjoy de la Mure.

In July 2024, he was announced to be the flag carrier for the United Arab Emirates at the 2024 Paris Olympics.

== Personal life ==
He graduated with a double bachelor's degree from Sorbonne University Abu Dhabi.
