= Equestrian at the 2017 Asian Indoor and Martial Arts Games =

- Venue: Ashgabat Equestrian Centre
- Dates: 21–23 September 2017

Equestrian jumping was contested at the 2017 Asian Indoor and Martial Arts Games from 21 September to 23 September 2017. The competition took place at the Equestrian Center in Ashgabat, Turkmenistan with three events, team and individual events along with the Akhal-Teke Cup, a competition for Turkmenistan's native breed of horse.

== Medalists ==
Event	Gold	Silver	Bronze
Akhal-Teke	Nikolaý Beglarýan; Turkmenistan	Abdullah Al-Sharbatly; Saudi Arabia	Kamil Sabitov; Kyrgyzstan
Individual jumping	Hamad Al-Attiyah; Qatar	Khaled Al-Mobty; Saudi Arabia	Davoud Pourrezaei; Iran
Team jumping	Saudi Arabia; Khaled Al-Mobty; Khaled Al-Eid; Saad Al-Ajmi; Abdullah Al-Sharbatly	Qatar; Hamad Al-Attiyah; Faleh Al-Ajami; Salmen Al-Suwaidi; Salman Al-Emadi	Syria; Amre Hamcho; Mohamad Joubarani; Mustafa Zndaki; Ahmad Hamcho

== Medal table ==
Rank	Nation	Gold	Silver	Bronze	Total
1	Saudi Arabia (KSA)	1	2	0	3
2	Qatar (QAT)	1	1	0	2
3	Turkmenistan (TKM)	1	0	0	1
4	Iran (IRI)	0	0	1	1
4	Kyrgyzstan (KGZ)	0	0	1	1
4	Syria (SYR)	0	0	1	1
Totals (6 entries)		3	3	3	9

== Results ==
=== Akhal-Teke ===
21 September

Rank	Athlete	Pen.	Time
1st place, gold medalist(s)	Nikolaý Beglarýan (TKM) on Toychi	1	67.18
2nd place, silver medalist(s)	Abdullah Al-Sharbatly (KSA) on Tagsyr	4	61.36
3rd place, bronze medalist(s)	Kamil Sabitov (KGZ) on Tanymal	4	62.33
4	Fagilýa Zaripowa (TKM) on Altyn Khan	4	64.54
5	Nasser Al-Ghazali (QAT) on Gelshikli	5	68.30
6	Davoud Pourrezaei (IRI) on Akylly	8	60.69
7	Hanjarmyrat Gyşykow (TKM) on Matlap II	14	73.30
8	Xeniya Garkushkina (KAZ) on Rovayat	38	72.22
—	Mohamad Joubarani (SYR) on Bereket	EL	
—	Bakhromjon Gaziev (UZB) on Azim-Sher	EL	

=== Individual jumping ===
21–23 September

Rank	Athlete	Qualifier				Final		Jump-off	
Rank	Athlete	1	2	3	Total	Pen.	Time	Pen.	Time
1st place, gold medalist(s)	Hamad Al-Attiyah (QAT) on Clinton	0	0	4	4	0		0	38.81
2nd place, silver medalist(s)	Khaled Al-Mobty (KSA) on Dona Evita	0	0	0	0	0		0	39.91
3rd place, bronze medalist(s)	Davoud Pourrezaei (IRI) on Veliciano	4	EL	4	60	0		0	41.86
4	Kamil Sabitov (KGZ) on Quintendro	0	4	0	4	0		0	42.90
5	Abdullah Al-Sharbatly (KSA) on Woulon L	0	0	0	0	0		4	40.55
6	Amre Hamcho (SYR) on Al Murtajiz	0	0	1	1	0		11	56.59
7	Salman Al-Emadi (QAT) on Zorro Z	0	0	4	4	0		12	42.25
8	Rinat Galimov (KGZ) on Dukato M	4	0	0	4	4	71.98		
9	Ahmad Hamcho (SYR) on Lola V	0	0	0	0	8	68.33		
10	Amir Hossein Habibi (IRI) on Annaloma	4	1	6	11	8	69.20		
11	Begli Garajaýew (TKM) on Dabaraly	12	16	16	44	8	71.67		
12	Umidjon Komilov (UZB) on Chickaboo	8	9	5	22	9	75.17		
13	Nurjan Tuyakbaev (UZB) on King Cornet L	1	4	9	14	10	76.85		
14	Alexandr Tishkov (KAZ) on Lord Loksli	16	4	8	28	17	74.43		
15	Medet Mauletbekov (KAZ) on Das Phantom	12	8	17	37	33	88.87		
16	Khaled Al-Eid (KSA) on Ina van de Nieuwburghoeve	0	0	0	0				
17	Faleh Al-Ajami (QAT) on Armstrong van de Kapel	1	0	5	6				
18	Mohamad Joubarani (SYR) on Etos HBC	4	0	7	11				
19	Okiljon Sobirjonov (UZB) on Camira	12	8	8	28				
20	Yerzhan Korabay (KAZ) on Green's Singapore	16	24	RT	RT				
21	Ali Rahmati (IRI) on Quo Vadis	5	4	EL	EL				
22	Hanjarmyrat Gyşykow (TKM) on Kalbynur	16	EL	EL	EL				
23	Ezberguly Babalyýew (TKM) on Yenish	8	32	EL	EL				
24	Salmen Al-Suwaidi (QAT) on Cantaro 32	4	5		9				
25	Saad Al-Ajmi (KSA) on HHS Dublin	0	16		16				
26	Myrzat Sabitov (KGZ) on Charlize	0	16		16				
27	Khurshidbek Alimdjanov (UZB) on Cordon Bleu	17	4		21				
28	Sadyr Mamytov (KGZ) on Charivari	27	12		39				
29	Mustafa Zndaki (SYR) on Wasabi	8	EL		60				
30	Nurbolat Kartkozhak (KAZ) on Camelot	EL	EL		99				
31	Nikolaý Beglarýan (TKM) on Altyntumar	EL	EL		99				

=== Team jumping ===
21 September

Rank	Team	Round		Total
Rank	Team	1	2	Total
1st place, gold medalist(s)	Saudi Arabia (KSA)	0	0	0
2nd place, silver medalist(s)	Qatar (QAT)	1	0	1
3rd place, bronze medalist(s)	Syria (SYR)	4	0	4
4	Kyrgyzstan (KGZ)	4	16	20
5	Uzbekistan (UZB)	21	16	37
6	Kazakhstan (KAZ)	44	36	80
—	Iran (IRI)	13	EL	EL
—	Turkmenistan (TKM)	36	EL	EL
