= Khaled Al-Mobty =

Saudi Arabian equestrian (born 1998)

Personal information
- Full name: Khaled Abdulrahman Al-Mobty
- Born: 19 October 1998 (age 27) Riyadh, Saudi Arabia

Sport
- Country: Saudi Arabia
- Sport: Equestrian
- Event: Show jumping
Medal record
Equestrian
Representing Saudi Arabia
Asian Games
Gold medal – first place	2018 Jakarta–Palembang	Team jumping
Gold medal – first place	2026 Aichi–Nagoya	Team jumping
Bronze medal – third place	2026 Aichi–Nagoya	Individual jumping
Asian Indoor and Martial Arts Games
Gold medal – first place	2017 Ashgabat	Team jumping
Silver medal – second place	2017 Ashgabat	Individual jumping
Islamic Solidarity Games
Gold medal – first place	2025 Riyadh	Individual jumping

Khaled Abdulrahman Al-Mobty (Arabic: خالد عبد الرحمن المبطي; born 19 October 1998 in Riyadh) is a Saudi Arabian show jumping rider. He competed at the 2018 Asian Games where he won team gold and at the 2017 Asian Indoor and Martial Arts Games, where he won individual silver and team gold in the team competition. He also took part in the 2019 FEI World Cup Finals in Gothenburg and the 2024 FEI World Cup Finals. He represented the Saudi Arabian team at the 2024 Olympic Games in Paris where he finished 19th in the team competition.

== See also ==
- Horses in Saudi Arabia
