= Samantha Lam =

Samantha Lam may refer to:

- Samantha Lam (equestrian) (born 1978), Chinese-Canadian equestrian who competed for Hong Kong at the 2008 Summer Olympics
- Samantha Lam (singer) (active 1981–present), Hong Kong singer and songwriter
