= Abdulla Al-Marri =

U.A.E. equestrian

Personal information
- Born: Abdulla Mohd Al-Marri; 22 June 1984 (age 42)

Sport
- Country: United Arab Emirates
- Sport: Equestrian
Medal record
Equestrian
Representing United Arab Emirates
Asian Games
| Bronze medal – third place | 2022 Hangzhou | Individual jumping |
| Bronze medal – third place | 2022 Hangzhou | Team jumping |

Abdulla Mohd Al-Marri (born 22 June 1984) is an equestrian who rides for the United Arab Emirates in show jumping.

== Career ==
He made his debut for the UAE at an international show jumping competition in Sharjah in 2002.

In 2013, he won the main showjumping class at the inaugural Festival of the Horse in Dubai.

He was a member of the UAE team that won the Challenge Cup at the FEI Nations Cup Finals in Barcelona in 2017.

At the 2022 Asian Games held in Hangzhou, China, he won two medals in the show jumping, an individual bronze and team bronze.

He secured a spot at the 2024 Olympic Games at a regional qualifier in Doha in January 2024.

In July 2024, he was confirmed for the United Arab Emirates at the 2024 Paris Olympics.
