= Equestrian at the 2018 Summer Youth Olympics – Individual jumping =

Individual jumping at the III Summer Youth Olympic Games
- Venue: Argentine Equestrian Club
- Dates: 12–13 October
- Competitors: 30 from 30 nations

Medalists
| 1st place, gold medalist(s) | | Giacomo Casadei | Italy |
| 2nd place, silver medalist(s) | | Omar Al Marzouqi | United Arab Emirates |
| 3rd place, bronze medalist(s) | | Pedro Espinosa | Honduras |

These are the results for the Individual jumping event at the 2018 Summer Youth Olympics.

== Schedule ==
All times are local (UTC−3).

| Date | Time | Round |
|---|---|---|
| Friday, 12 October | 14:00 | Round A |
| Saturday, 13 October | 14:00 | Round B |
| Saturday, 13 October | 15:30 | Jump-off |

== Results ==
=== Rounds A and B ===
| Rank | Rider | Nation | Horse | Penalties Round A | | | Penalties Round B | | | Total Penalties A+B | Time B |
| Rank | Rider | Nation | Horse | Jump | Time | Total | Jump | Time | Total | Total Penalties A+B | Time B |
|---|---|---|---|---|---|---|---|---|---|---|---|
| 1 | Mattie Hatcher | United States | Santa Rosa Valery | 0 | 0 | 0 | 0 | 0 | 0 | 0 | 51.64 |
| 1 | Omar Al Marzouqi | United Arab Emirates | La Corina Lala | 0 | 0 | 0 | 0 | 0 | 0 | 0 | 53.41 |
| 1 | Giacomo Casadei | Italy | Darna Z | 0 | 0 | 0 | 0 | 0 | 0 | 0 | 53.96 |
| 1 | Richard Kierkegaard | Argentina | Legolas I | 0 | 0 | 0 | 0 | 0 | 0 | 0 | 52.68 |
| 1 | Pedro Espinosa | Honduras | Llavaneras Genquina | 0 | 0 | 0 | 0 | 0 | 0 | 0 | 49.91 |
| 6 | Briar Burnett-Grant | New Zealand | Milagro Maximo | 0 | 0 | 0 | 4 | 0 | 4 | 4 | 49.38 |
| 7 | Simon Jan Morssinkhof | Belgium | Cheptel Wigan | 0 | 0 | 0 | 4 | 0 | 4 | 4 | 51.26 |
| 8 | Agostina Llano Zuccolillo | Paraguay | Red Sugar Z | 0 | 0 | 0 | 4 | 0 | 4 | 4 | 51.57 |
| 9 | Madeline Sinderberry | Australia | Zambo | 0 | 0 | 0 | 4 | 0 | 4 | 4 | 53.82 |
| 10 | Momen Zindaki | Syria | Cooper Larquino | 0 | 0 | 0 | 4 | 0 | 4 | 4 | 54.64 |
| 11 | Anna Bunty Howard | Zambia | Call Girl Z | 0 | 0 | 0 | 4 | 0 | 4 | 4 | 56.34 |
| 12 | Vince Jármy | Hungary | Walterstown Cruise Z | 0 | 0 | 0 | 8 | 0 | 8 | 8 | 48.89 |
| 13 | Mateo Philippe Coles | Haiti | Quid Du Plessis | 4 | 0 | 4 | 4 | 0 | 4 | 8 | 49.03 |
| 14 | Ahmed Nasser Elnaggar | Egypt | Jos Africa De Parco | 8 | 0 | 8 | 0 | 0 | 0 | 8 | 53.18 |
| 15 | Marissa del Pilar Thompson | Panama | Canal Del Bajo Kithira | 0 | 0 | 0 | 8 | 0 | 8 | 8 | 53.80 |
| 16 | Philip Mattos Botelho | Brazil | Denise Z | 8 | 0 | 8 | 0 | 0 | 0 | 8 | 54.17 |
| 17 | Abdushukur Sobirjonov | Uzbekistan | Quby Z | 8 | 0 | 8 | 0 | 0 | 0 | 8 | 54.34 |
| 18 | Brianagh Lindsay Clark | Zimbabwe | El Roblecito Malaika | 4 | 0 | 4 | 4 | 0 | 4 | 8 | 55.14 |
| 19 | Gonzalo Bedoya | Bolivia | Ankara I | 4 | 0 | 4 | 4 | 0 | 4 | 8 | 56.59 |
| 20 | Nicole Meyer Robredo | Mexico | El Capricho Champion | 4 | 0 | 4 | 8 | 0 | 8 | 12 | 51.41 |
| 21 | Rowen van de Mheen | Netherlands | Baral Ourika | 12 | 0 | 12 | 0 | 0 | 0 | 12 | 55.31 |
| 22 | Jack Whitaker | Great Britain | L V Chance Luck | 4 | 0 | 4 | 8 | 0 | 8 | 12 | 56.41 |
| 23 | Margaux Koenig | Mauritius | B M Urlefe | 4 | 0 | 4 | 12 | 0 | 12 | 16 | 52.48 |
| 24 | In Shaallah Hameed | Iraq | Kings Charade | 4 | 0 | 4 | 12 | 0 | 12 | 16 | 55.88 |
| 25 | Hannah Ivy Garton | South Africa | Jos Cassius | 16 | 0 | 16 | 4 | 0 | 4 | 20 | 54.20 |
| 26 | Sara Hussein Saleh Al Armouti | Jordan | Passe One Z | 12 | 7 | 19 | 4 | 0 | 4 | 23 | 52.70 |
| 27 | Arshia Najafinia | Iran | La Trinidad Pietro | 20 | 0 | 20 | 12 | 0 | 12 | 32 | 56.20 |
| | Mohammed Alqashouti | Qatar | Quelqu'un Z | 16 | 0 | 16 | | | EL | | |
| | Bernardo Lander | Venezuela | Roi Quake Z | | | EL | | | | | |
| | Edgar Fung | Hong Kong | The Winner Z | | | NS | | | | | |

=== Jump-off ===
| Rank | Rider | Nation | Horse | Penalties | Time (s) |
|---|---|---|---|---|---|
| 1st place, gold medalist(s) | Giacomo Casadei | Italy | Darna Z | 0 | 31.79 |
| 2nd place, silver medalist(s) | Omar Al Marzouqi | United Arab Emirates | La Corina Lala | 0 | 34.37 |
| 3rd place, bronze medalist(s) | Pedro Espinosa | Honduras | Llavaneras Genquina | 4 | 30.80 |
| 4 | Mattie Hatcher | United States | Santa Rosa Valery | 8 | 30.97 |
| 5 | Richard Kierkegaard | Argentina | Legolas I | 12 | 38.68 |
