= Janakabhorn Karunayadhaj =

Thai equestrian (born 1997)

Personal information
- Native name: ชนกภรณ์ การุณยธัช
- Nickname: Pri-an
- Born: 18 August 1997 (age 28) Bangkok, Thailand

Sport
- Country: Thailand
- Sport: Equestrian
- Event: Show jumping

Janakabhorn Karunayadhaj (Thai: ชนกภรณ์ การุณยธัช, RTGS: Chanokphon Karunyathat, Thai pronunciation: [t͡ɕʰá.nòk̚.pʰɔ̄ːn kāː.rūn.já.tʰát̚]; born 18 August 1997 in Bangkok, Thailand), nicknamed Pri-an (Thai: ปรีดิ์อัญ, Thai pronunciation: [prīː.ʔān]), is a Thai equestrian. Karunayadhaj competed at the 2018 FEI World Equestrian Games and at the 2022 Asian Games. She has been selected by the Thai Equestrian Federation to represent Thailand as individual at the 2024 Summer Olympics in Paris, which will be her first Olympic appearance.
