= Ramzy Al-Duhami =

Saudi Arabian equestrian

Ramzy Al-Duhami رمزي الدهامي
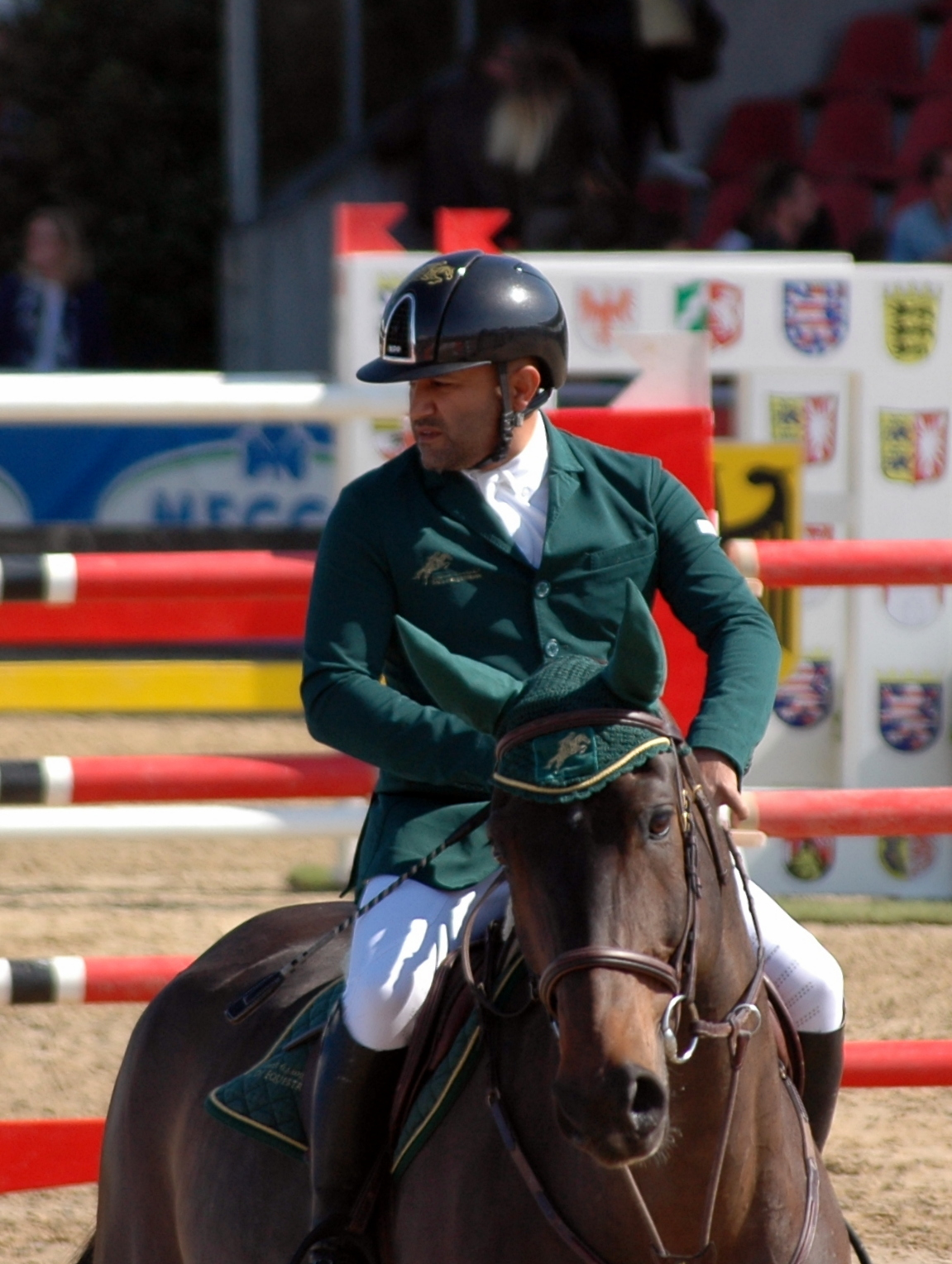
- Ramzy Al-Duhami at the 51st "Maimarkt-Turnier" Mannheim 2014

Personal information
- Nationality: Saudi Arabian
- Born: 5 January 1972 (age 54) Riyadh, Saudi Arabia
- Height: 162 cm (5 ft 4 in)

Sport
- Country: Saudi Arabia
- Sport: Equestrian
Medal record
Equestrian
Representing Saudi Arabia
Olympic Games
Bronze medal – third place	2012 London	Team jumping
Asian Games
Gold medal – first place	2022 Hangzhou	Team jumping
Gold medal – first place	2010 Guangzhou	Individual jumping
Gold medal – first place	2010 Guangzhou	Team jumping
Gold medal – first place	2018 Jakarta–Palembang	Team jumping
Gold medal – first place	2026 Aichi–Nagoya	Team jumping
Gold medal – first place	2026 Aichi–Nagoya	Individual jumping
Bronze medal – third place	2018 Jakarta–Palembang	Individual jumping
Islamic Solidarity Games
Gold medal – first place	2005 Jeddah	Team

Ramzy Al-Duhami (Arabic: رمزي الدهامي; born 5 January 1972) is a Saudi Arabian show jumping rider. He was born in Riyadh. He competed at the 1996, 2000, 2004, 2008, 2012 and 2024 Summer Olympics, and won a bronze medal at the 2012 Summer Olympics.

== See also ==
- Horses in Saudi Arabia
