= Abdulrahman Alrajhi =

Saudi Arabian equestrian (born 1995)

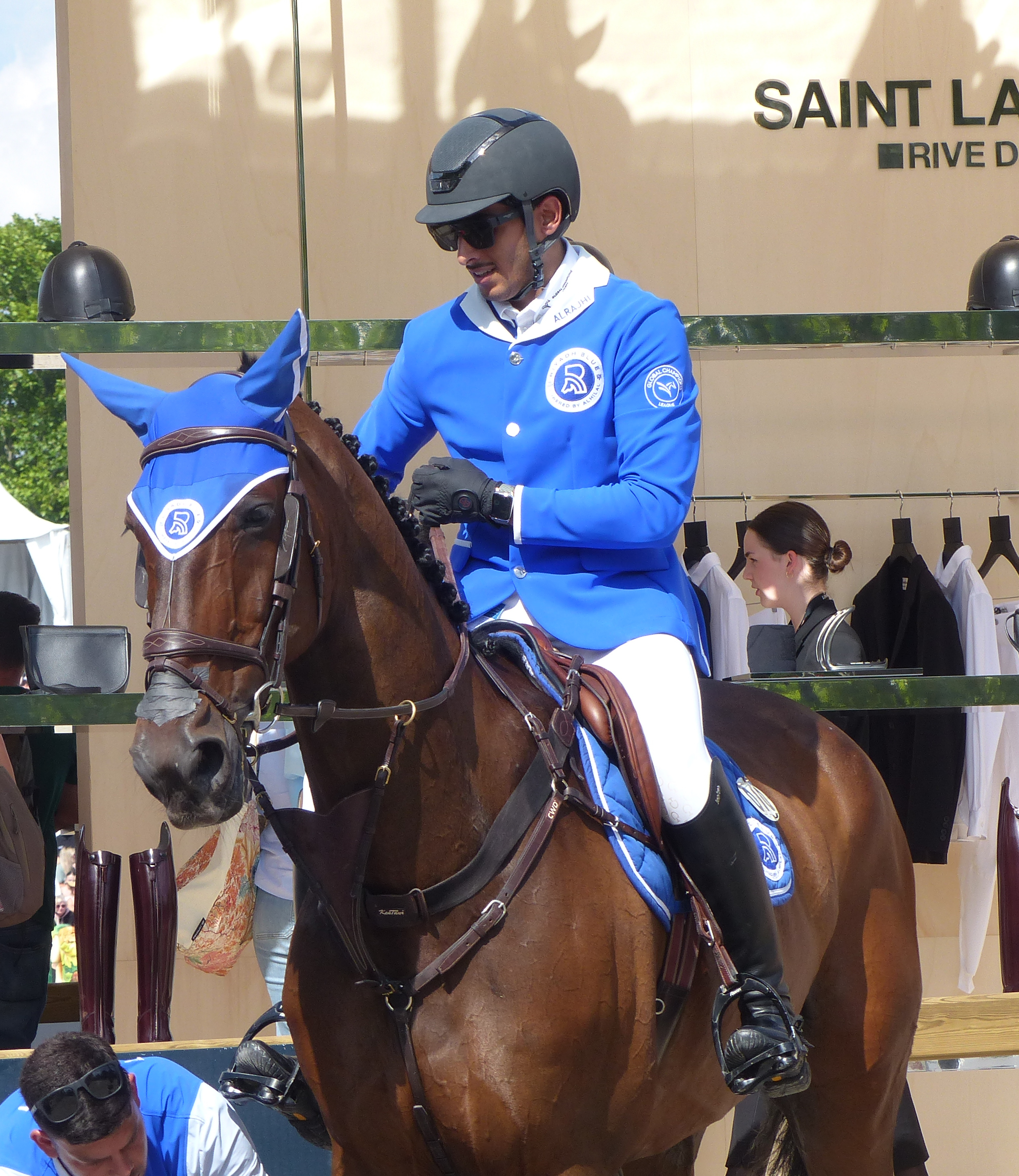
- Alrajhi at the Paris Eiffel Horse Show in 2023.

Personal information
- Nationality: Saudi Arabian
- Born: 10 April 1995 (age 31) Riyadh, Saudi Arabia

Sport
- Country: Saudi Arabia
- Sport: Equestrian
Medal record
Equestrian
Representing Saudi Arabia
Asian Games
| Gold medal – first place | 2022 Hangzhou | Team jumping |
| Silver medal – second place | 2026 Aichi–Nagoya | Individual jumping |
| Silver medal – second place | 2014 Incheon | Team jumping |

Abdulrahman Alrajhi (Arabic: عبدالرحمن الراجحي; born 10 April 1995, Riyadh, Saudi Arabia) is a Saudi Arabian show jumping rider. He competed at the 2022 Asian Games and the 2022 Asian Games, where he won team silver and team gold in the team competition. He also took part in the 2018 FEI World Cup Finals and the 2023 FEI World Cup Finals. He has been selected to represent the Saudi Arabian team at the 2024 Olympic Games in Paris.

== See also ==
- Horses in Saudi Arabia
