= Abdullah Al-Sharbatly =

Saudi Arabian equestrian

Abdullah Al Sharbatly
Personal information
- Full name: Abdullah Waleed Al Sharbatly
- Nationality: Saudi Arabian
- Born: 21 September 1982 (age 43) England

Sport
- Country: Saudi Arabia
- Sport: Equestrian
Medal record
Equestrian
Representing Saudi Arabia
Olympic Games
Bronze medal – third place	2012 London	Team jumping
World Championships
Silver medal – second place	2010 Kentucky	Individual jumping
Asian Games
Gold medal – first place	2006 Doha	Team jumping
Gold medal – first place	2010 Guangzhou	Team jumping
Gold medal – first place	2014 Incheon	Individual jumping
Gold medal – first place	2018 Jakarta-Palembang	Team jumping
Gold medal – first place	2022 Hangzhou	Individual jumping
Gold medal – first place	2022 Hangzhou	Team jumping
Silver medal – second place	2014 Incheon	Team jumping
Asian Indoor and Martial Arts Games
Gold medal – first place	2017 Ashgabat	Team jumping
Silver medal – second place	2017 Ashgabat	Akhal-Teke cup
Pan Arab Games
Gold medal – first place	2007 Cairo	Team jumping

Abdullah Waleed Al Sharbatly (Arabic: عبد الله الشربتلي; born 21 September 1982 in London, England) is a Saudi Arabian equestrian who competes in the sport of show jumping. He is mostly known because of his win of the individual silver medal at the 2010 FEI World Equestrian Games. He was part of the Saudi team that won the bronze medal at the 2012 Summer Olympics.

== Career ==
He started competing in England at the age of seven. He was Arab Champion at the age of sixteen. He first competed internationally in England at Hickstead. He has competed in the Asian Games, the Pan-Arab Games and in many Grand Prix. He is sponsored by the Saudi Equestrian Fund.

Al Sharbatly became the first Middle Eastern medallist and finalist when he won the silver medal on Seldana di Campalto at the WEG Show Jumping Championships in Kentucky in 2010, coming second only to Belgium's Phillipe Le Jeune on his horse Vigo D'Arsouilles.

=== Major results ===
World Championships:

Year	Venue	Horse	Ind. Rank	Team Rank
2010	6th WEG, Lexington KY (USA)	Seldana di Campalto	2	8
2006	5th WEG, Aachen (GER)	Hugo Gesmeray	102	22

World Cup Final:

Year	Venue	Horse	Team Rank
2010	CSI-W Final, Geneva (SUI)	Goldex	43
2006	CSI-W Final, Kuala Lumpur (MAS)	Quatro	22
2005	Las Vegas (USA)	Neuville	39

Other Events:

Year	Venue	Horse	Ind. Rank	Team Rank
2007	Pan-Arab Games, Cairo (EGY)	No Time	9	1
2006	Asian Games, Doha (QAT)	Hugo Gesmeray	25	1

== Personal life ==
Al Sharbatly currently resides in Jeddah, Saudi Arabia. He is married and by profession is a businessman and student, having obtained a BA in Business Administration and studied Computerisation, English, Economics and Marketing. He speaks English and Arabic. His most influential person is his father, because "he raised me well."

== See also ==
- Horses in Saudi Arabia
