= Li Zhenqiang =

Chinese equestrian

Li Zhenqiang (born July 23, 1968, in Dongguan, Guangdong) is a Chinese Olympic equestrian.

== Achievements ==
| Year | Games | Event | Placing |
|---|---|---|---|
| 2005 | National Games | Individual jumping | Silver |
| 2004 | National Equestrian Championships | Team jumping | Gold |
| 2002 | Asian Games | Individual jumping | Sixth |
| 2002 | National Equestrian Championships | Individual jumping | Gold |
