= Latifa bint Ahmed Al Maktoum =

Emirati equestrian

Medal record

Equestrian

Representing the United Arab Emirates

Asian Games
Silver medal – second place	2010 Guangzhou	Individual jumping
Silver medal – second place	2010 Guangzhou	Team jumping

Sheikha Latifa bint Ahmed bin Juma Al Maktoum (born 27 September 1985) is an equestrian athlete from the United Arab Emirates who competed in 2008 Summer Olympics in Beijing, the 2010 FEI World Equestrian Games in Lexington, Kentucky, and the 2013, 2015 and 2026 Show Jumping World Cup.

She was the first woman to represent the United Arab Emirates at the Olympics. In April 2019, she placed second in the 21st Emirates Show Jumping Championship.

Her notable rides include Kalaska de Semilly, Peanuts De Beaufor, Cobolt 8 and Cornet XL, a former ride of Richard Vogel.

== Personal life ==
Al Maktoum is the daughter of Sheikha Hessa bint Rashid Al Maktoum (sister of Mohammed bin Rashid Al Maktoum) and niece of Hind bint Maktoum Al Maktoum.
