= Li Yaofeng =

Chinese equestrian

Personal information
- Nationality: China
- Born: 16 November 1997 (age 27); Dongguan, China

Sport
- Sport: Equestrian

Li Yaofeng (born 16 November 1997) is a Chinese equestrian. He competed in the 2020 Summer Olympics.
