= Kenneth Cheng =

Hong Kong equestrian

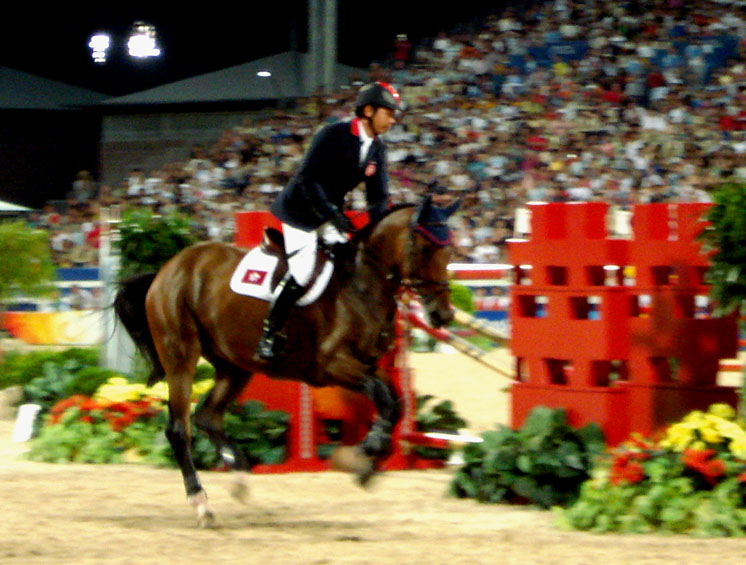
- Cheng in 2008

Personal information
- Full name: Kenneth Cheng Man Kit
- Nationality: Hong Konger
- Born: 7 April 1988 (age 38) Hong Kong

Sport
- Sport: Equestrian
Medal record
Equestrian
Representing Hong Kong
Asian Games
Bronze medal – third place	2010 Guangzhou	Team jumping

Kenneth Cheng Man Kit (Chinese: 文傑鄭; born 7 April 1988) is a Hong Kong equestrian. He competed in two events at the 2008 Summer Olympics.
