= Eiken Sato =

Japanese equestrian

Personal information
- Nationality: Japanese
- Born: 8 January 1986 (age 40) Ogawa, Japan

Sport
- Sport: Equestrian

Eiken Sato (佐藤 英賢, Satō Eiken; born 8 January 1986) is a Japanese equestrian. He competed in the individual jumping event at the 2008 Summer Olympics.
