= Horses in Saudi Arabia =

Equine culture in Saudi Arabia

In Saudi Arabia, the horse is an integral part of both culture and sport. The country has become a major force in competitive riding, particularly show jumping, thanks to riders like Abdullah Al-Sharbatly, who have won several Olympic medals since the beginning of the 21st century.

== History ==
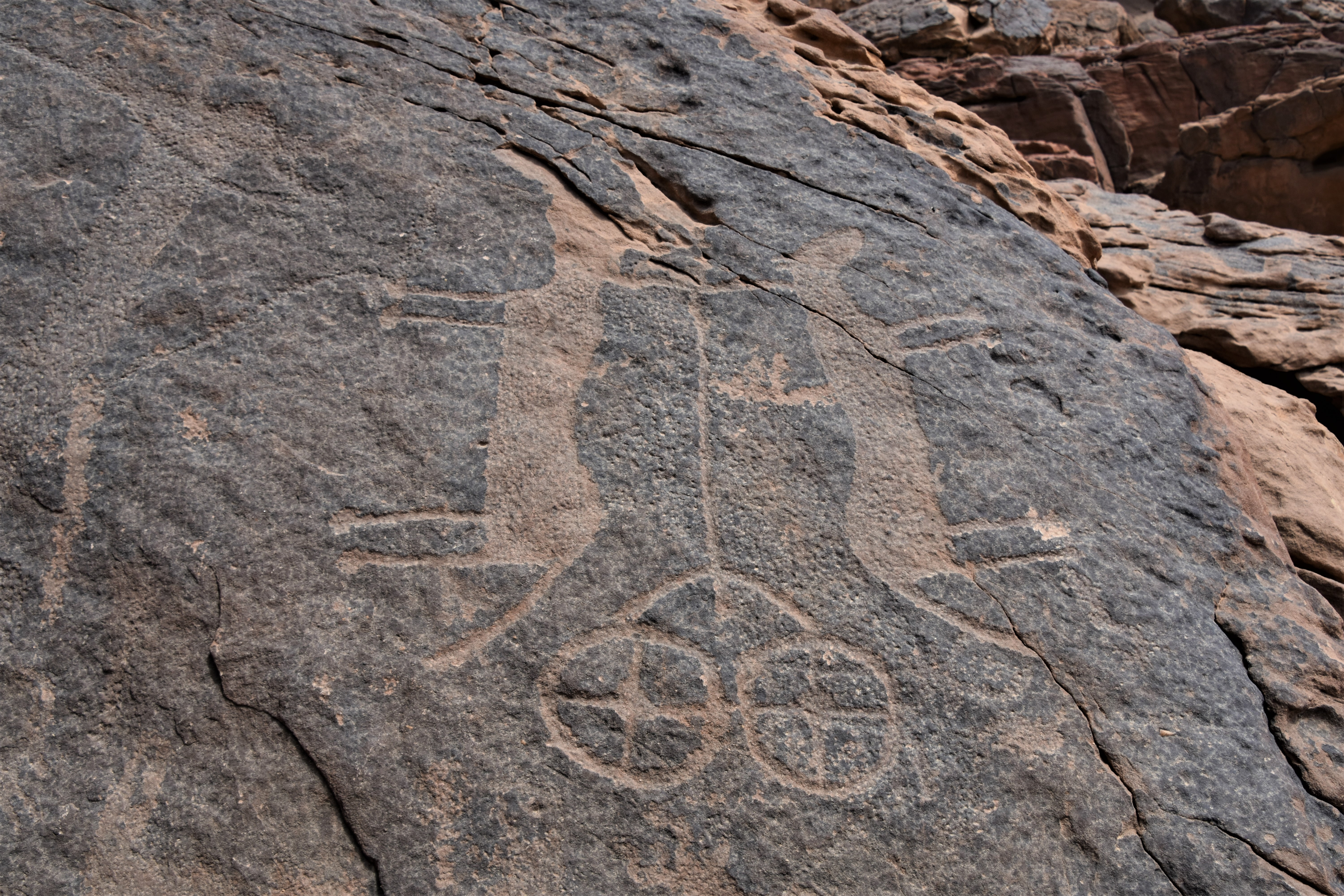
A petroglyph in Jubbah (from circa 1500 BCE) depicting two horses pulling wheeled carts

What appear to be bridle marks discovered in 2011 on a depiction of an equine saw the birth of a theory of horse domestication around 7,000 BC near Abha in the province of Asir. According to Saudi archaeologists, the al-Maqar civilization was highly advanced during the Neolithic period, notably in its craftsmanship and artistic representations, including a metre-high bust of an equine. This discovery, which has been widely publicized but given little credence by specialists, requires further serious study.

== Investments ==
The Saudi royal family is particularly active in horse racing. In 2009, the Kingdom of Saudi Arabia decided to invest $500 million to build up a national show jumping team. In early 2012, in preparation for the Olympic Games in London, the kingdom purchased world-class show jumping horses.

== Culture ==
Horses are considered respectable in Saudi Arabia, and any public mistreatment of this animal arouses indignation. On the other hand, women's access to horse riding is highly restricted: they can only practice the sport within the confines of an equestrian center. In September 2014, a woman defied this law by riding on the outskirts of Mecca. Although a Saudi woman rider took part in the Youth Olympic Games in Singapore in 2010, the country was nabbed for non-compliance with the Olympic Charter.

In June 2013, the Grand Mufti Sheikh Abdul Aziz Al-Asheikh denounced horse statues in the southern province of Jizan as idolatrous. They were then removed or destroyed.

== Controversies ==
Like its neighbors in the Middle East (Dubai and Qatar), Saudi Arabia has been the subject of controversy on the international equestrian scene due to doping scandals.

== See also ==
- Arabian horse
- Saudi Cup, international horse race in Riyadh
- Horses in Iran
