= Koki Saito (equestrian) =

Japanese equestrian

Personal information
- Nationality: Japanese
- Born: 16 September 1989 (age 36) Chiba, Japan

Sport
- Sport: Equestrian
- Event: Show jumping

Koki Saito (齋藤功貴, Saitō Kōki, born 16 September 1989) is a Japanese show jumping competitor. He represented Japan at the 2020 Summer Olympics in Tokyo 2021, competing in individual jumping.
