= Ali Al-Rumaihi =

Qatari equestrian (born 1981)

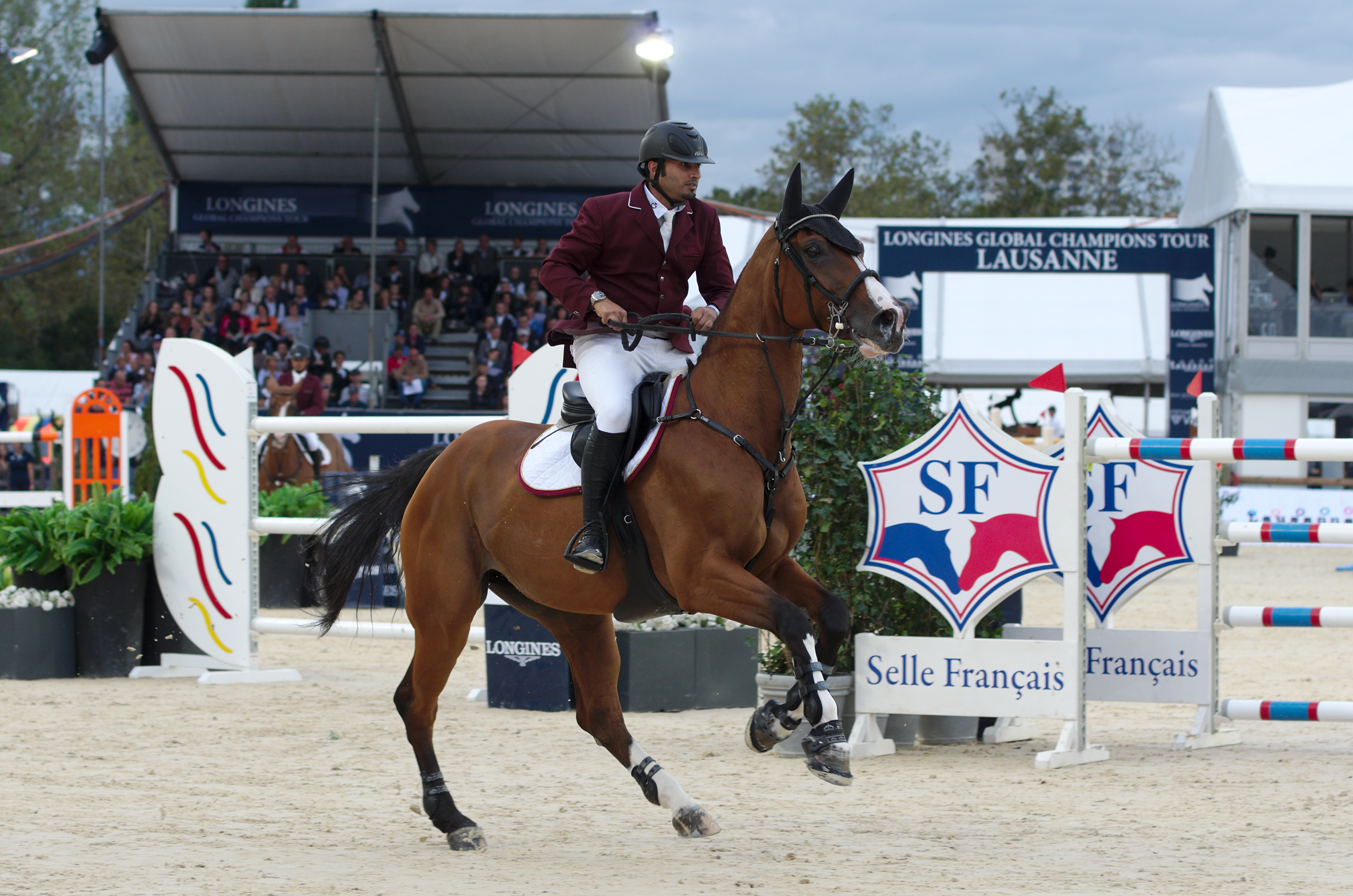

Personal information
- Full name: Ali Yousuf Ahmad Saad Al Rumaihi
- Nationality: Qatar
- Discipline: Jumping
- Born: 26 August 1981 (age 43); Qatar
- Height: 1.77 m (5 ft 10 in)
- Weight: 86 kg (190 lb)
Medal record
Equestrian
Representing Qatar
Asian Games
Gold medal – first place	2006 Doha	Team jumping
Pan Arab Games
Gold medal – first place	2011 Doha	Individual jumping
Silver medal – second place	2011 Doha	Team jumping

Ali Yousef Al-Rumaihi (born 26 August 1981) is a Qatari Olympic show jumping rider. He participated at the 2016 Summer Olympics in Rio de Janeiro, Brazil, where he placed 9th in the team and 16th in the individual competition.

Al-Rumaihi competed at the 2010 World Equestrian Games, where he finished 26th in the team competition and 81st individually. He also participated at several regional games including two Asian Games (in 2006 and 2010). He won a team gold in Doha at the 2006 Asian Games.
