= Wong I-sheau =

Taiwanese equestrian (born 1989)

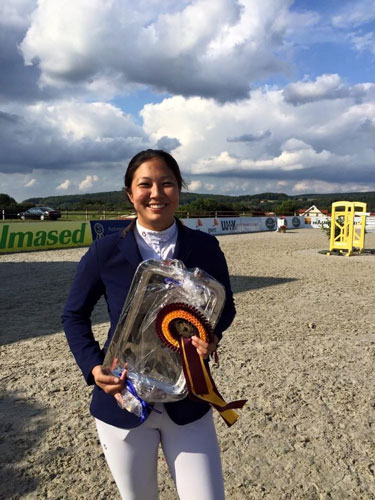

Wong I-sheau (汪亦岫, Pinyin: Wāng Yìxiù; born February 12, 1989, in Taipei, Taiwan) is a Taiwanese equestrian who competes in show jumping. She represented Chinese Taipei at the 2016 Summer Olympics in Rio de Janeiro, Brazil where she competed in the Equestrian Jumping Individual event. She finished in 68th place. Wong was the flagbearer for the Chinese Taipei Olympic Team in the 2016 Summer Olympics Parade of Nations. She is the first athlete to compete in the Equestrian events in the history of the country.

Wong qualified for the Rio 2016 Games in the Group G FEI qualifier in Hagen, Germany on August 25, 2015. Her horse is an 11-year-old Dutch Warmblood mare named Zadarijke V. Wong also trains with a Dutch gelding named Quinlan.

Wong studied at Wellesley College in Wellesley, Massachusetts, where she competed for the Wellesley Blue team.

Having represented Taiwan in the past 3 Asian Games, Wong will be once again riding for Team Taipei in the 2018 Asian Games in Jakarta.

Wong's sister is artist Ilyn Wong.
