= Bakhromjon Gaziev =

Uzbek sports administrator (born 1979)

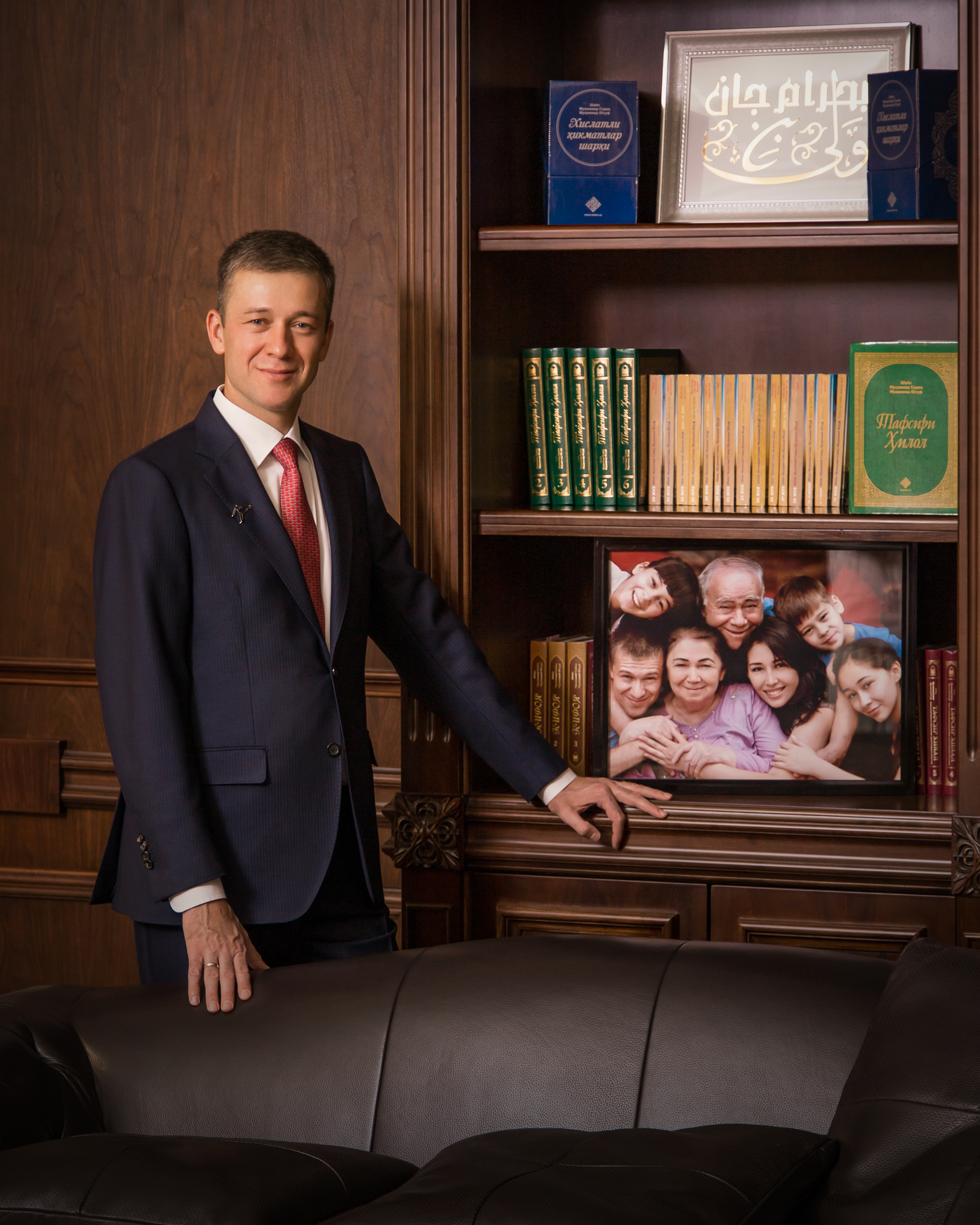

Chairman at the Modern Pentathlon Federation of Uzbekistan
- Preceded by: Farruh Fazliev
- Succeeded by: 3 December 2018

Chairman at the Federation of Horse Breeding and Equestrian Sports of Uzbekistan
- Incumbent
- Assumed office 2019

Chairman at the Polo Federation of Uzbekistan
- Incumbent
- Assumed office 10 October 2020

Vice President of the Eurasian Equestrian Association
- Incumbent
- Assumed office 20 February 2021

Personal details
- Born: Gaziev Bahromjon Valievich; 21 September 1979 (age 47) Tashkent, Uzbek SSR, Soviet Union
- Education: Tashkent State Pedagogical University named after Nizami (bachelor degree); Tashkent State University of Economics (master degree)

Bakhromjon Gaziev (uzb: Bahromjon Gaziyev; ru:Газиев, Бахромжон Валиевич, born 21 September 1979) - is an Uzbek sports administrator, Chairman of the Modern Pentathlon Federation of Uzbekistan Federation of Horse Breeding and Equestrian Sports of Uzbekistan and Polo Federation of Uzbekistan. Executive Member of National Olympic Committee of Uzbekistan and Vice President of the Eurasian Equestrian Association

== Biography ==
Bakhromjon Gaziev was born on 21 September 1979 in Tashkent, Uzbekistan.

Gaziev is a professional show jumper and he has been involved in sports since 2010. He is a master of sports of Uzbekistan of International Class.

- 2017-2018 — Vice President of Horse Breeding and Equestrian Sports Federation of Uzbekistan
- 2018 — Chairman at the Modern Pentathlon Federation of Uzbekistan
- 2019 — Chairman at the Federation of Horse Breeding and Equestrian Sports of Uzbekistan
- 2020 — Chairman at the Polo Federation of Uzbekistan
- 2021 — Vice President of the Eurasian Equestrian Association

=== Education ===
In 2001, he received a bachelor's degree from the Tashkent Pedagogical University named after Nizami. In 2003, he graduated a master of International Economic relations at the Tashkent State Economic University.

== Family ==
Bakhromjon Gaziev is married and has 2 daughters and a son.
