= Khaled Al-Eid =

Saudi Arabian equestrian

Medal record

Equestrian

Representing Saudi Arabia

Olympic Games
Bronze medal – third place	2000 Sydney	Individual jumping

Asian Games
Gold medal – first place	2006 Doha	Team jumping
Gold medal – first place	2010 Guangzhou	Team jumping
Gold medal – first place	2018 Jakarta	Team jumping
Bronze medal – third place	2010 Guangzhou	Individual jumping

Khaled Al-Eid (Arabic: خالد العيد; born January 2, 1969) is a Saudi Arabian equestrian who won a bronze medal in individual jumping at the 2000 Summer Olympics.
