= Samantha Lam (equestrian) =

Equestrian

Medal record

Equestrianism

Representing Hong Kong

Asian Games
| Bronze medal – third place | 2010 Guangzhou | Team jumping |

Samantha Lam Tzi-sum (Chinese: 林子心; Jyutping: lam^{4} zi^{2} sam^{1}; born June 29, 1978, in Vancouver, British Columbia) is a Chinese-Canadian equestrian. She competed for Hong Kong at the 2008 Summer Olympics.
