= Patrick Lam =

Hong Kong equestrian

Personal information
- Nationality: Hong Konger
- Born: 24 June 1983 (age 43)

Sport
- Sport: Equestrian
Medal record
Equestrian
Representing Hong Kong
Asian Games
Bronze medal – third place	2010 Guangzhou	Team jumping

Patrick Lam (born 24 June 1983) is a Hong Kong equestrian. He competed in two events at the 2008 Summer Olympics.
