= Bassem Hassan Mohammed =

Qatari equestrian

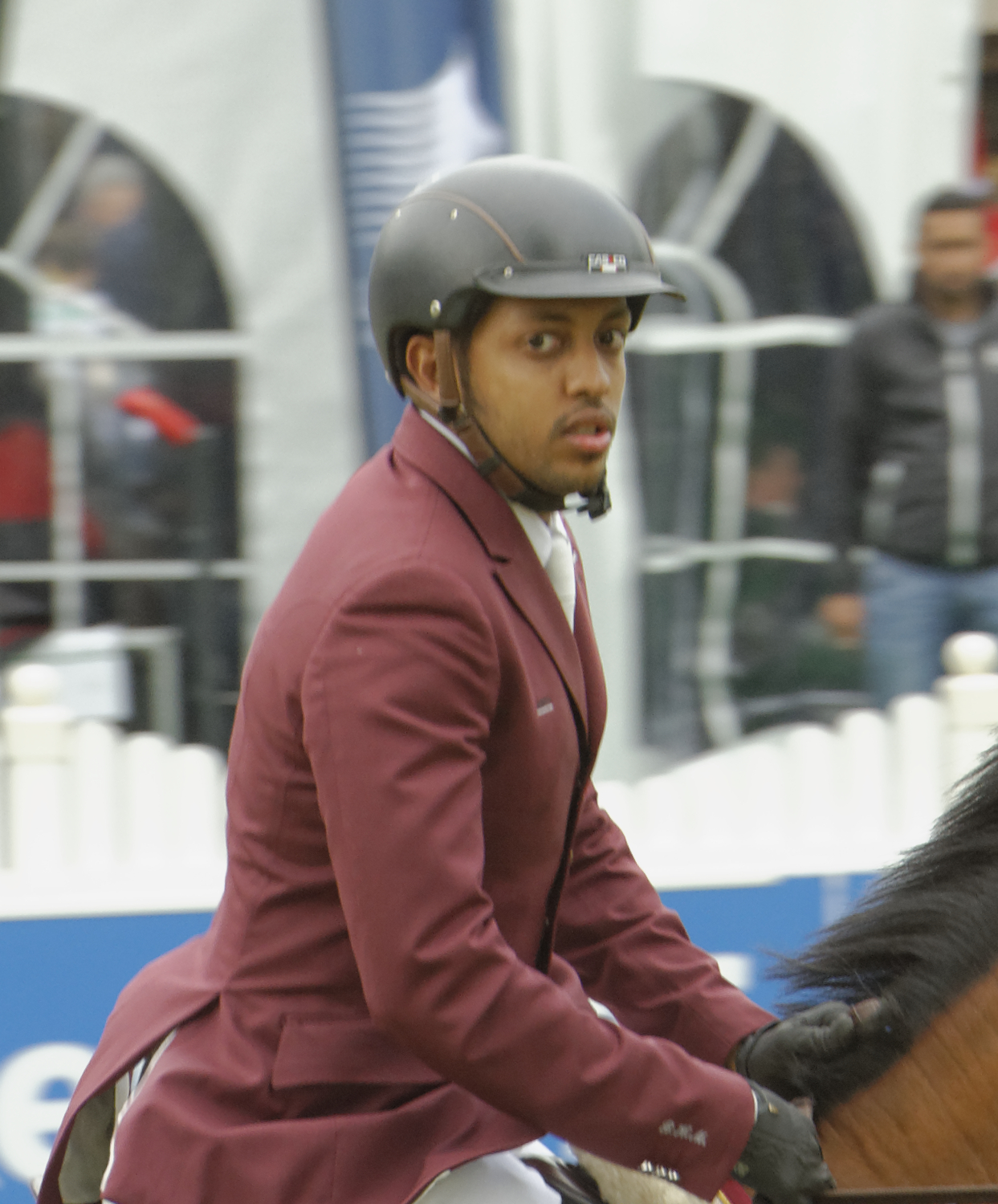

Personal information
- Born: 31 May 1987 (age 39)

Sport
- Country: Qatar
- Sport: Equestrian
Medal record
Equestrian
Representing Qatar
Asian Games
Gold medal – first place	2014 Incheon	Team jumping
Bronze medal – third place	2026 Aichi–Nagoya	Individual jumping
Bronze medal – third place	2018 Jakarta–Palembang	Team jumping

Bassem Hassan Mohammed (born 31 May 1987) is a Qatari equestrian. He competed in the individual jumping competition at the 2016 Summer Olympics. Bassem Hassan Mohammed was positive in a doping test done during an Olympic qualifier in Rabat in October 2019.
