= Taizo Sugitani =

Japanese equestrian

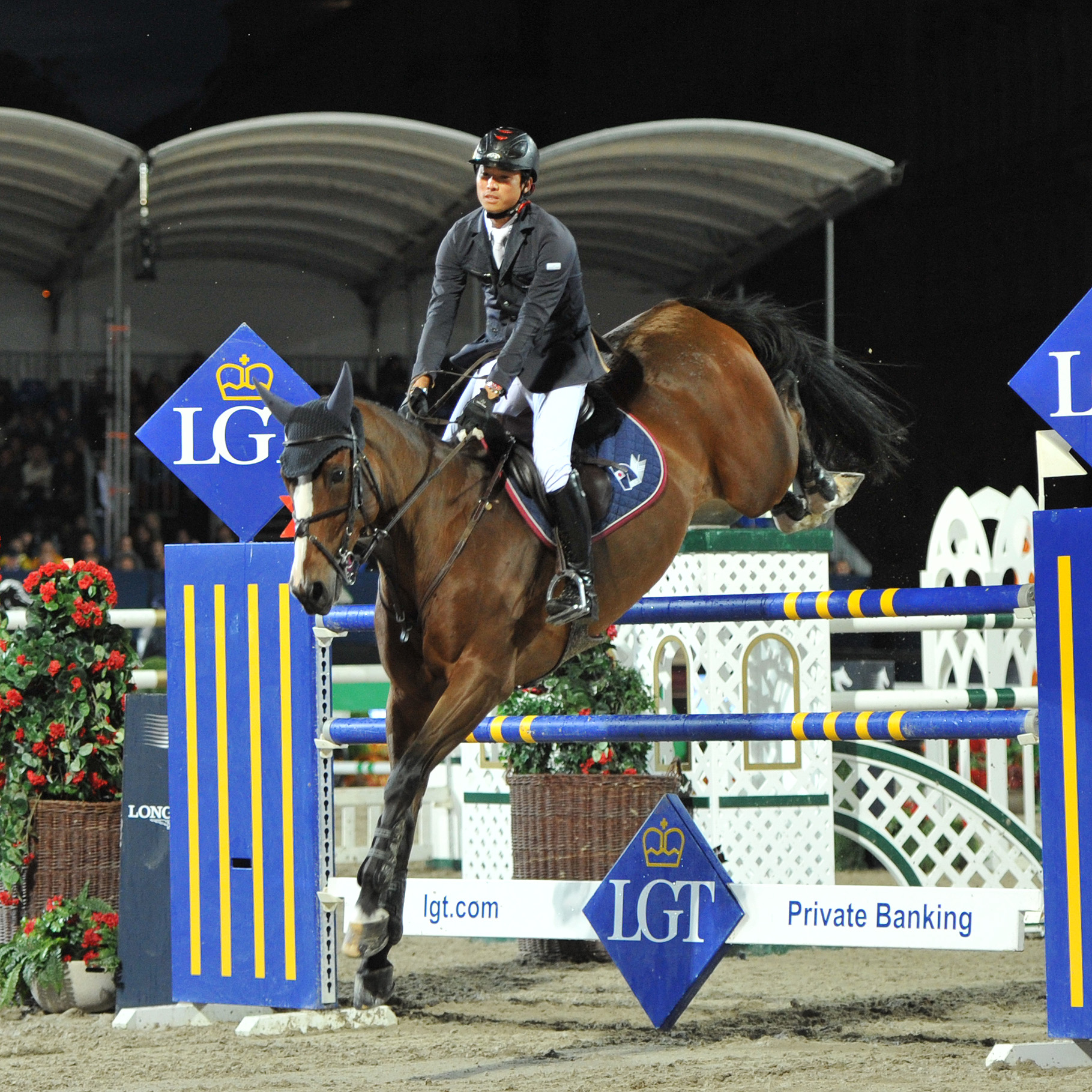

Personal information
- Born: June 27, 1976 (age 50) Izumi, Japan
Medal record
Equestrian
Representing Japan
Asian Games
Silver medal – second place	2018 Jakarta-Palembang	Team jumping
Bronze medal – third place	2014 Incheon	Individual jumping
Bronze medal – third place	2014 Incheon	Team jumping

Taizo Sugitani (杉谷 泰造, Sugitani Taizō; born 27 June 1976 in Izumi, Japan) is a Japanese Olympic show jumping rider. Representing Japan, he competed in seven Summer Olympics (in 1996, 2000, 2004, 2008, 2012, 2016, and 2024). By competing in Paris 2024 he became the first Japanese athlete to compete in seven Summer Olympics. He placed 11th in team jumping in 2000. Meanwhile, his current best individual Olympic placement is 15th place from Athens in 2004.

He is the son of the Olympic rider and riding club owner Masayu Sugitani. After graduating from Canadian Academy in Kobe in 1996, he moved to the Netherlands to get coached by former Dutch champion Henk Nooren.

Sugitani also competed at six editions World Equestrian Games (each edition from 1994 to 2014) and at two editions of Show Jumping World Cup finals (in 2000 and 2007). In 2010, he was 10th place at the World Equestrian Games in Kentucky.

Sugitani won two bronze medals at the 2014 Asian Games in Incheon, South Korea.

== Family ==
- Koichi Kawaguchi
- Masayasu Sugitani
