= Ali Al-Thani =

Qatari equestrian (born 1982)

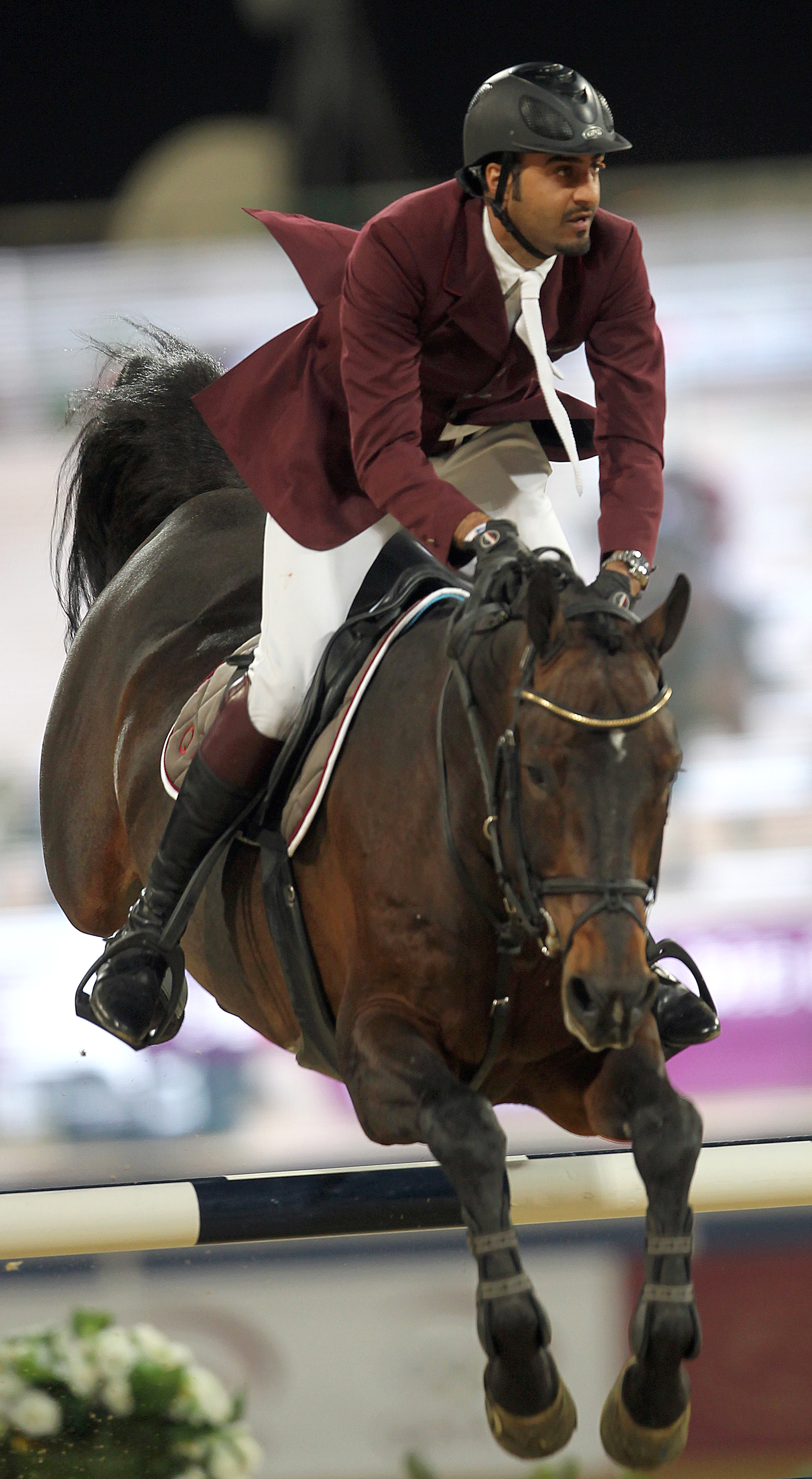
Al-Thani in 2012

Sheikh Ali Bin Khalid Al-Thani (born September 1, 1982) is a Qatari equestrian. He competed at the 2016 Summer Olympics in the individual jumping event, in which he placed sixth, and in the team jumping event, in which Qatar's team placed ninth. He was the flag bearer for Qatar at the Parade of Nations.

At the 2019 Olympic qualifier in Rabat, Al-Thani tested positive for cannabis.
