= Equestrian at the 2020 Summer Olympics – Team eventing =

Team eventing at the Games of the XXXII Olympiad
- Olympic equestrian eventing
- Venue: Baji Koen; Sea Forest Cross-Country Course
- Date: 30 July – 2 August 2021
- Competitors: 45 from 15 nations

Medalists
1st place, gold medalist(s)		Laura Collett; Tom McEwen; Oliver Townend	Great Britain
2nd place, silver medalist(s)		Kevin McNab; Andrew Hoy; Shane Rose	Australia
3rd place, bronze medalist(s)		Nicolas Touzaint; Karim Laghouag; Christopher Six	France

The team eventing event at the 2020 Summer Olympics took place from 30 July to 2 August 2021 at the Baji Koen and Sea Forest Cross-Country Course. Like all other equestrian events, the eventing competition is open-gender, with both male and female athletes competing in the same division. 45 riders (15 teams of 3) from 15 nations competed.

== Background ==
This will be the 25th appearance of the event, which has been held at every Summer Olympics since it was introduced in 1912.

The reigning Olympic champion is France (Karim Laghouag, Thibaut Vallette, Mathieu Lemoine, and Astier Nicolas). The reigning (2018) World Champion is Great Britain (Rosalind Canter, Piggy French, Tom McEwen, and Gemma Tattersall).

An Olympics.com preview of equestrian (all events) provided the following overview:

Germany has won the most gold medals in Olympic equestrian sports (26 to be exact), reflecting the country's equestrian heritage and passion for the sport. Michael Jung has dominated individual eventing at recent Games, winning gold in both London 2012 and Rio 2016. Jung was destined to carve his name into equestrian history: both his father and grandfather were well-known equestrian athletes. Sweden, France, the USA and Great Britain are among the other leading nations in equestrian sport.

== Qualification ==
A National Olympic Committee (NOC) could enter 1 team of 3 riders in the team event. Quota places are allocated to the NOC, which selects the riders. There were 15 team quota places available, allocated as follows:

- Host nation: Japan was guaranteed a team
- World Games: The top 6 teams at the 2018 FEI World Equestrian Games, excluding Japan
- European Championships: The top 2 teams from the 2019 FEI European Championships, in geographic groups A and B (Northwest and Southwest Europe)
- Group C event: The top team from a group C (Central Europe, Eastern Europe, and Central Asia) qualification event
- Pan American Games: The top 2 teams from the 2019 Pan-American Games, with groups D and E covering North, Central, and South America
- Groups F/G event: The top 2 teams from a groups F and G (Africa, Middle East, Southeast Asia, Oceania) qualification event
- Nations Cup: The top team from the 2019 Eventing Nations Cup Final, changed to the highest ranked team in the 2019 Eventing Nations Cup Series

== Competition format ==
The eventing competition features all 45 riders competing in three rounds (dressage, cross-country, and jumping). Scores from all 3 riders on each team are summed to give a team score; the number of team members was reduced from 4 in 2016 to 3, with there no longer being a dropped score.

- Dressage test: A shortened dressage competition, with penalties based on the dressage score
- Cross-country test: A race over a 4.5 kilometre cross-country course. The time allotted is 8 minutes (570 metres per minute), with penalties assessed for exceeding that time. There are a maximum of 38 obstacles, with penalties assessed for faults. Staggered starts.
- Jumping test: A 600-metre show jumping course, with 11 or 12 obstacles (including double and triple jumps, with a maximum of 16 jumps total). Maximum height of obstacles is 1.25 metres. The required speed is 375 metres/minute (time limit of 1:36). Penalties are assessed for exceeding the time limit and for faults at the obstacles.

== Schedule ==
The event took place over four days, with two days for the dressage followed by cross-country and jumping on the next two days.

All times are Japan Standard Time (UTC+9).

Day	Date	Start	Finish	Phase
Day 7	Friday, 30 July 2021	8:00	11:10	Dressage Day 1 - Session 1
Day 7	Friday, 30 July 2021	17:30	20:55	Dressage Day 1 - Session 2
Day 8	Saturday, 31 July 2021	8:00	11:10	Dressage Day 2 - Session 3
Day 9	Sunday, 1 August 2021	8:30	11:55	Cross Country
Day 10	Monday, 2 August 2021	17:00	22:25	Jumping

== Results ==
=== Standings after dressage ===
At the end of the two days of dressage, Olympic champions Germany and World champions Great Britain had already broken away from the pack, with Germany, for the first time since 2008, not in the lead after the first discipline

Nation	Individual results			Team penalties	Team rank
Nation	Rider	Horse	Penalties	Team penalties	Team rank
Great Britain	Oliver Townend	Ballaghmor Class	23.60	78.30	1
Great Britain	Laura Collett	London 52	25.80	78.30	1
Great Britain	Tom McEwen	Toledo de Kerser	28.90	78.30	1
Germany	Michael Jung	Chipmunk	21.10	80.40	2
Germany	Julia Krajewski	Amande de B'Neville	25.20	80.40	2
Germany	Sandra Auffarth	Viamant du Matz	34.10	80.40	2
New Zealand	Tim Price	Vitali	25.60	86.40	3
New Zealand	Jesse Campbell	Diachello	30.10	86.40	3
New Zealand	Jonelle Price	Grovine de Reve	30.70	86.40	3
Japan	Kazuma Tomoto	Vinci de la Vigne	25.90	90.10	4
Japan	Yoshiaki Oiwa	Calle 44	31.50	90.10	4
Japan	Toshiyuki Tanaka	Talma d'Allou	32.70	90.10	4
Sweden	Louise Romeike	Cato 60	28.00	91.10	5
Sweden	Therese Viklund	Viscera	28.10	91.10	5
Sweden	Ludvig Svennerstål	Balham Mist	35.00	91.10	5
Australia	Andrew Hoy	Vassily de Lassos	29.60	93.40	6
Australia	Shane Rose	Virgil	31.70	93.40	6
Australia	Kevin McNab	Don Quidam	32.10	93.40	6
China	Alex Huan Tian	Don Geniro	23.90	93.60	7
China	Bao Yingfeng	Flandia	34.50	93.60	7
China	Sun Huadong	Lady Chin van't Moerven Z	35.20	93.60	7
United States	Phillip Dutton	Z	30.50	94.60	8
United States	Boyd Martin	Tsetserleg	31.10	94.60	8
United States	Doug Payne	Vandiver	33.00	94.60	8
France	Christopher Six	Totem de Brecey	29.60	95.10	9
France	Karim Laghouag	Triton Fontaine	32.40	95.10	9
France	Nicholas Touzaint	Absolut Gold	33.10	95.10	9
Switzerland	Felix Vogg	Colero	26.70	99.20	10
Switzerland	Mélody Johner	Toubleu de Rueire	36.10	99.20	10
Switzerland	Robin Godel	Jet Set	36.40	99.20	10
Brazil	Marcelo Tosi	Glenfly	31.50	103.6	11
Brazil	Rafael Losano	Fuiloda	36.00	103.6	11
Brazil	Carlos Paro	Goliath	36.10	103.6	11
Poland	Malgorzata Cybulska	Chenaro	31.00	104.6	12
Poland	Jan Kaminski	Jard	33.10	104.6	12
Poland	Joanna Pawlak	Fantastic Frieda	40.50	104.6	12
Ireland	Sam Watson	Flamenco	34.30	110.40	13
Ireland	Austin O'Connor	Colorado Blue	38.00	110.40	13
Ireland	Sarah Ennis	Woodcourt Garrison	38.10	110.40	13
Thailand	Korntawat Samran	Bonero K	32.50	113.10	14
Thailand	Weerapat Pitakanonda	Carnival March	38.20	113.10	14
Thailand	Arinadtha Chavatanont	Boleybawn Prince	42.40	113.10	14
Italy	Susanna Bordone	Imperial van de Holtakkers	33.90	115.40	15
Italy	Vittoria Panizzon	Super Cillious	38.60	115.40	15
Italy	Arianna Schivo	Quefira de l'Ormeau	42.90	115.40	15

=== Standings after cross-country ===
Germany suffered a nightmare cross country, with over 34 points in penalties all but knocking them out of medal contention, and ending the defense of their Olympic title. Great Britain, by contrast, backed up their earlier excellent dressage work with a faultless cross-country, posting three of only seven clear rounds all day, which gave them a huge 18 point lead going into the final discipline, the showjumping, equivalent to four posts down. Australia and France took advantage of Germany's disaster to move into medal position, and clear of the pack.

Team rank	Nation	Individual results				Team penalties
Team rank	Nation	Rider	Horse	Cross Country Penalties	Total Penalties	Team penalties
1	Great Britain	Oliver Townend	Ballaghmor Class	0.00	23.60	78.30
1	Great Britain	Laura Collett	London 52	0.00	25.80	78.30
1	Great Britain	Tom McEwen	Toledo de Kerser	0.00	28.90	78.30
2	Australia	Andrew Hoy	Vassily de Lassos	0.00	29.60	96.20
2	Australia	Shane Rose	Virgil	0.00	31.70	96.20
2	Australia	Kevin McNab	Don Quidam	2.80	34.90	96.20
3	France	Christopher Six	Totem de Brecey	1.60	31.20	97.10
3	France	Karim Laghouag	Triton Fontaine	0.00	32.40	97.10
3	France	Nicholas Touzaint	Absolut Gold	0.40	33.50	97.10
4	New Zealand	Tim Price	Vitali	1.20	26.80	104.00
4	New Zealand	Jesse Campbell	Diachello	14.40	44.50	104.00
4	New Zealand	Jonelle Price	Grovine de Reve	2.00	32.70	104.00
5	United States	Phillip Dutton	Z	4.80	35.30	109.40
5	United States	Boyd Martin	Tsetserleg	3.20	34.30	109.40
5	United States	Doug Payne	Vandiver	6.80	39.80	109.40
6	Germany	Michael Jung	Chipmunk	11.00	32.10	114.20
6	Germany	Julia Krajewski	Amande de B'Neville	0.40	25.60	114.20
6	Germany	Sandra Auffarth	Viamant du Matz	22.40	56.50	114.20
7	Italy	Susanna Bordone	Imperial van de Holtakkers	11.00	44.90	132.80
7	Italy	Vittoria Panizzon	Super Cillious	3.60	42.20	132.80
7	Italy	Arianna Schivo	Quefira de l'Ormeau	2.80	45.70	132.80
8	Ireland	Sam Watson	Flamenco	13.00	47.30	161.00
8	Ireland	Austin O'Connor	Colorado Blue	0.00	38.00	161.00
8	Ireland	Sarah Ennis	Woodcourt Garrison	37.60	75.70	161.00
9	China	Alex Huan Tian	Don Geniro	12.00	35.90	185.60
9	China	Bao Yingfeng	Flandia	38.00	72.50	185.60
9	China	Sun Huadong	Lady Chin van't Moerven Z	42.00	77.20	185.60
10	Switzerland	Felix Vogg	Colero	11.80	38.50	311.40
10	Switzerland	Mélody Johner	Toubleu de Rueire	0.40	36.50	311.40
10	Switzerland	Robin Godel	Jet Set	200.00	236.40	311.40
11	Japan	Kazuma Tomoto	Vinci de la Vigne	1.60	27.50	322.50
11	Japan	Yoshiaki Oiwa	Calle 44	200.00	231.50	322.50
11	Japan	Toshiyuki Tanaka	Talma d'Allou	30.80	63.50	322.50
12	Brazil	Marcelo Tosi	Glenfly	8.80	40.30	335.20
12	Brazil	Rafael Losano	Fuiloda	200.00	236.00	335.20
12	Brazil	Carlos Paro	Goliath	22.80	58.90	335.20
13	Poland	Malgorzata Cybulska	Chenaro	200.00	231.00	362.60
13	Poland	Jan Kaminski	Jard	12.80	45.90	362.60
13	Poland	Joanna Pawlak	Fantastic Frieda	45.20	85.70	362.60
14	Sweden	Louise Romeike	Cato 60	200.00	269.00	711.10
14	Sweden	Therese Viklund	Viscera	200.00	228.10	711.10
14	Sweden	Ludvig Svennerstål	Balham Mist	Withdrew	35.00+20.00	711.10
14	Sweden	Sara Algotsson Olstholt	Chicuelo	200.00	200.00	711.10
15	Thailand	Korntawat Samran	Bonero K	200.00	232.50	713.10
15	Thailand	Weerapat Pitakanonda	Carnival March	200.00	238.20	713.10
15	Thailand	Arinadtha Chavatanont	Boleybawn Prince	200.00	242.40	713.10

=== Final standings (after jumping) ===
Despite three clear rounds from the defending champions Germany lifting them to fourth, the medal positions remained unchanged as Great Britain won Olympic team eventing gold for the first time since 1972, a gap of 49 years. Australia took silver, with France taking the bronze medals.

Rank	Nation	Individual results				Total team Penalties
Rank	Nation	Rider	Horse	Jumping Penalties	Total Penalties	Total team Penalties
1st place, gold medalist(s)	Great Britain	Oliver Townend	Ballaghmor Class	4.00	27.60	86.30
1st place, gold medalist(s)	Great Britain	Laura Collett	London 52	4.00	29.80	86.30
1st place, gold medalist(s)	Great Britain	Tom McEwen	Toledo de Kerser	0.00	28.90	86.30
2nd place, silver medalist(s)	Australia	Andrew Hoy	Vassily de Lassos	0.00	29.60	100.20
2nd place, silver medalist(s)	Australia	Shane Rose	Virgil	4.00	35.70	100.20
2nd place, silver medalist(s)	Australia	Kevin McNab	Don Quidam	0.00	34.90	100.20
3rd place, bronze medalist(s)	France	Christopher Six	Totem de Brecey	0.00	31.20	101.50
3rd place, bronze medalist(s)	France	Karim Laghouag	Triton Fontaine	4.00	36.40	101.50
3rd place, bronze medalist(s)	France	Nicholas Touzaint	Absolut Gold	0.40	33.90	101.50
4	Germany	Michael Jung	Chipmunk	0.00	32.10	114.20
4	Germany	Julia Krajewski	Amande de B'Neville	0.00	25.60	114.20
4	Germany	Sandra Auffarth	Viamant du Matz	0.00	56.50	114.20
5	New Zealand	Tim Price	Vitali	12.00	38.80	116.40
5	New Zealand	Jesse Campbell	Diachello	0.40	44.90	116.40
5	New Zealand	Jonelle Price	Grovine de Reve	0.00	32.70	116.40
6	United States	Phillip Dutton	Z	8.00	43.30	125.80
6	United States	Boyd Martin	Tsetserleg	4.40	38.70	125.80
6	United States	Doug Payne	Vandiver	4.00	43.80	125.80
7	Italy	Susanna Bordone	Imperial van de Holtakkers	0.00	44.90	144.80
7	Italy	Vittoria Panizzon	Super Cillious	8.00	50.20	144.80
7	Italy	Arianna Schivo	Quefira de l'Ormeau	4.00	49.70	144.80
8	Ireland	Sam Watson	Flamenco	8.00	55.30	177.00
8	Ireland	Austin O'Connor	Colorado Blue	4.00	42.00	177.00
8	Ireland	Sarah Ennis	Woodcourt Garrison	4.00	79.70	177.00
9	China	Alex Huan Tian	Don Geniro	8.80	44.70	209.60
9	China	Bao Yingfeng	Flandia	5.60	78.10	209.60
9	China	Sun Huadong	Lady Chin van't Moerven Z	9.60	86.80	209.60
10	Switzerland	Felix Vogg	Colero	8.00	46.50	339.40
10	Switzerland	Mélody Johner	Toubleu de Rueire	0.00	36.50	339.40
10	Switzerland	Robin Godel	Jet Set	–	236.40	339.40
10	Switzerland	Eveline Bodenmüller	Violine de la Brasserie	0.00	0.00	339.40
10	Switzerland	Replacement penalty			20.00	339.40
11	Japan	Kazuma Tomoto	Vinci de la Vigne	4.00	31.50	358.50
11	Japan	Yoshiaki Oiwa	Calle 44	–	231.50	358.50
11	Japan	Toshiyuki Tanaka	Talma d'Allou	12.00	75.50	358.50
11	Japan	Ryuzo Kitajima	Feroza Nieuwmoed	0.00	0.00	358.50
11	Japan	Replacement penalty			20.00	358.50
12	Brazil	Marcelo Tosi	Glenfly	WD	40.30	463.60
12	Brazil	Rafael Losano	Fuiloda	100.00 (WD)	336.00	463.60
12	Brazil	Carlos Paro	Goliath	4.00	62.90	463.60
12	Brazil	Márcio Appel	Iberon Jmen	4.40	4.40	463.60
12	Brazil	Replacement penalty			20.00	463.60
13	Poland	Malgorzata Cybulska	Chenaro	8.00	239.00	479.80
13	Poland	Jan Kaminski	Jard	9.20	55.10	479.80
13	Poland	Joanna Pawlak	Fantastic Frieda	100.00 (WD)	185.70	479.80
14	Sweden	Louise Romeike	Cato 60	12.00	240.00	744.30
14	Sweden	Therese Viklund	Viscera	8.40	236.50	744.30
14	Sweden	Ludvig Svennerstål	Balham Mist	–	35.00	744.30
14	Sweden	Sara Algotsson Olstholt	Chicuelo	12.80	212.80	744.30
14	Sweden	Replacement penalty			20.00	744.30
15	Thailand	Korntawat Samran	Bonero K	100.00 (WD)	332.50	1013.10
15	Thailand	Weerapat Pitakanonda	Carnival March	100.00 (WD)	338.20	1013.10
15	Thailand	Arinadtha Chavatanont	Boleybawn Prince	100.00 (WD)	342.40	1013.10
