= Equestrian events at the 2020 Summer Olympics =

Equestrian at the Games of the XXXII Olympiad
- Pictograms for Dressage (left), Eventing (center), and Jumping (right)
- Venue: Baji Koen; Sea Forest Cross-Country Course
- Dates: 24 July – 7 August 2021
- No. of events: 6
- Competitors: 200 from 49 nations

The equestrian events at the 2020 Summer Olympics in Tokyo featured three disciplines for both individual and team competitions.

Originally scheduled for 25 July – 8 August 2020, due to the COVID-19 pandemic, the games had been postponed with the equestrian events set for 24 July – 7 August 2021.

== Qualification ==
The 200 quota places for equestrian were divided between the three disciplines (75 for jumping, 65 for eventing, and 60 for dressage). Teams in each discipline consisted of three horse and rider pairs; any NOC that qualified a team (20 teams for jumping, 15 each for eventing and dressage) also received 3 entries in the individual competition for that discipline. NOCs that did not qualify teams could earn one individual place in dressage and jumping, and up to two individual places in eventing, for a total of 15 entries in jumping and dressage and 20 for eventing. Teams qualify primarily through specific competitions (World Equestrian Games and continental tournaments), while individuals qualified through ranking. The host nation, Japan, automatically qualified a team in each discipline.

== Participating nations ==
50 nations have qualified. Estonia, Israel, Latvia, Luxembourg, Singapore and Sri Lanka were scheduled to make their Olympic debuts in equestrian events.

- Argentina (3)
- Australia (9)
- Austria (5)
- Belarus (2)
- Belgium (8)
- Brazil (7)
- Canada (6)
- Chile (2)
- China (6)
- Colombia (1)
- Czech Republic (5)
- Denmark (5)
- Dominican Republic (2)
- Ecuador (1)
- Egypt (3)
- Estonia (1)
- Finland (1)
- France (9)
- Germany (9)
- Great Britain (9)
- Hong Kong (1)
- India (1)
- Ireland (7)
- Israel (3)
- Italy (5)
- Japan (9)
- Jordan (1)
- Latvia (1)
- Luxembourg (1)
- Mexico (4)
- Morocco (4)
- Netherlands (8)
- New Zealand (6)
- Norway (1)
- Poland (3)
- Portugal (4)
- Puerto Rico (1)
- ROC (5)
- Singapore (1)
- South Africa (2)
- South Korea (1)
- Spain (5)
- Sri Lanka (1)
- Sweden (9)
- Switzerland (7)
- Syria (1)
- Chinese Taipei (1)
- Thailand (3)
- Ukraine (2)
- United States (9)

== Competition format ==
=== Dressage ===
Teams are made of three athletes, all of whom are also competing for individual medals. Nations without a team can be represented by a single individual athlete.

Dressage competition starts with the Grand Prix, which serves as a qualifier for both team and individual competitions. Athletes are drawn into six heats of ten athletes each, with the opening three heats being scheduled for the first day, and the remaining three heats for the second day. Heats are drawn in such a way that no more than one athlete per NOC can be assigned to the same heat. Once the Grand Prix heats are concluded, team scores are decided by adding up individual scores of the respective team members. The top eight ranked teams qualify for the team final (Grand Prix Special), while the top two individual athletes from each heat, plus the next best six ranked athletes, qualify for the individual final (Grand Prix Freestyle).

Grand Prix Special, which is used to decide team medals, is a slightly more rigorous dressage test with emphasis on difficult transitions (such as collected walk - piaffe). Special is performed to music of athletes' choice, which, however, is not judged. As the slate is wiped clean after the Grand Prix, team medals are determined solely based on scores achieved in the Special. Nations taking part in the team final are allowed to enter a substitute athlete between the Grand Prix and up to two hours before the Special.

Grand Prix Freestyle is open for 18 athletes and is used to decide individual medals. Each athlete designs their own test for the Freestyle, which must be set to music and must contain 16 compulsory movements. Riders can tailor a test to their horses' strengths, as well as incorporate movements that are more difficult than those required in the Grand Prix or the Special (such as a pirouette in piaffe or flying changes on a curving line) in order to increase their scores. Individual medals are assigned based on scores in the Freestyle.

=== Eventing ===
Competitions for team and individual medals run concurrently. Each athlete, riding the same horse, performs a dressage test, a cross-country round, and a jumping round. Team medals are then awarded by adding together the scores of team members, from all three phases. The team with the lowest number of penalty points wins the gold. The top 25 individual athletes after the first jumping round perform a second, final, jumping round to determine individual medals. Therefore, those competing for individual glory complete one dressage test and cross-country round, and two jumping rounds.

Athletes who for various reasons fail to start or finish any of the phases are eliminated from the individual competition. Teams with eliminated athletes receive penalty points: 100 penalty points for each eliminated athlete during dressage and jumping phases, and 200 penalty points for each eliminated athlete during cross-country phase. While they are excluded from the individual event, eliminated athletes may continue to compete in the following phases for their teams, unless they were eliminated for lameness, fall of horse, abuse of horse or otherwise disqualified. Teams can additionally bring forward a reserve athlete at any point of the competition. In such case, the respective team is awarded 20 additional penalty points.

=== Jumping ===
Individual and team competitions are run separately.

Individual competition is up first and it takes two competition days. First competition day serves as a qualifier, where a total of 75 athletes may start. Each athlete tackles the same course, which includes 12 to 14 numbered obstacles. Athletes are ranked based on accumulated number of penalty points, and top 30 advance to individual final. In case of a tie for the last qualification place, athletes are separated by the time of their round. Individual final is held on a different course that includes 12 to 15 numbered obstacles. Athletes are once again ranked based on accumulated number of penalty points. If two or more athletes are tied for a medal position, the tie is resolved in a jump-off.

First day of team competition serves as a qualifier, and is opened to a total of 20 teams. At the end of the qualifier, teams receive their placing by adding up the penalties incurred by the three team members. Athletes who withdraw or are eliminated or who retire from the competition will not be given a score. Teams with one athlete who has withdrawn, retired or been eliminated from the team qualifier will be placed according to the combined penalties incurred by the two athletes who completed the competition. Teams in which all three athletes completed the competition without being eliminated or retiring shall be placed before teams with only two athletes who completed the competition without being eliminated or retiring. Teams with two athletes who have withdrawn and/or retired and/or been eliminated from the competition will be eliminated. The top 10 teams based on the qualifier results advance to team final. In case of a tie for the last qualification place, teams are separated by the combined time of their three team members. Team final is held on a different course. Teams are once again ranked based on accumulated number of penalty points of their team members. If two or more teams are tied for a medal position, the tie is resolved in a jump-off.

== Competition schedule ==
All times are Japan Standard Time (UTC+9).

Day	Date	Start	Finish	Event	Phase
Day 1	Saturday 24 July 2021	17:00	22:00	Individual dressage	Dressage Grand Prix Day 1
Day 1	Saturday 24 July 2021	17:00	22:00	Team dressage	Dressage Grand Prix Day 1
Day 2	Sunday 25 July 2021	17:00	22:00	Individual dressage	Dressage Grand Prix Day 2
Day 2	Sunday 25 July 2021	17:00	22:00	Team dressage	Dressage Grand Prix Day 2
Day 4	Tuesday 27 July 2021	17:30	22:40	Team dressage	Dressage Team Grand Prix Special
Day 5	Wednesday 28 July 2021	17:30	21:25	Individual dressage	Dressage Individual Grand Prix Freestyle
Day 7	Friday 30 July 2021	8:00	11:10	Individual eventing	Eventing Dressage Day 1 - Session 1
Day 7	Friday 30 July 2021	8:00	11:10	Team eventing	Eventing Dressage Day 1 - Session 1
Day 7	Friday 30 July 2021	17:30	20:55	Individual eventing	Eventing dressage Day 1 - Session 2
Day 7	Friday 30 July 2021	17:30	20:55	Team eventing	Eventing dressage Day 1 - Session 2
Day 8	Saturday 31 July 2021	8:00	11:10	Individual eventing	Eventing dressage Day 2 - Session 3
Day 8	Saturday 31 July 2021	8:00	11:10	Team eventing	Eventing dressage Day 2 - Session 3
Day 9	Sunday 1 August 2021	8:30	11:55	Individual eventing	Eventing Cross Country
Day 9	Sunday 1 August 2021	8:30	11:55	Team eventing	Eventing Cross Country
Day 10	Monday 2 August 2021	17:00	22:25	Individual eventing	Eventing Jumping
Day 10	Monday 2 August 2021	17:00	22:25	Team eventing	Eventing Jumping
Day 11	Tuesday 3 August 2021	19:00	22:45	Individual jumping	Jumping Individual Qualifier
Day 12	Wednesday 4 August 2021	19:00	21:40	Individual jumping	Jumping Individual Final
Day 14	Friday 6 August 2021	19:00	22:05	Team jumping	Jumping Team Qualifier
Day 15	Saturday 7 August 2021	19:00	21:20	Team jumping	Jumping Team Final

== Medal summary ==
Rank	NOC	Gold	Silver	Bronze	Total
1	Germany	3	1	0	4
2	Great Britain	2	1	2	5
3	Sweden	1	1	0	2
4	United States	0	2	0	2
5	Australia	0	1	1	2
6	Belgium	0	0	1	1
6	France	0	0	1	1
6	Netherlands	0	0	1	1
Totals (8 entries)		6	6	6	18

=== Medalists ===
Games	Gold	Silver	Bronze
Individual dressage	Jessica von Bredow-Werndl on Dalera; Germany	Isabell Werth on Bella Rose; Germany	Charlotte Dujardin on Gio; Great Britain
Team dressage	Germany; Jessica von Bredow-Werndl on Dalera; Dorothee Schneider on Showtime; Isabell Werth on Bella Rose	United States; Sabine Schut-Kery on Sanceo; Adrienne Lyle on Salvino; Steffen Peters on Suppenkasper	Great Britain; Charlotte Fry on Everdale; Carl Hester on En Vogue; Charlotte Dujardin on Gio
Individual eventing	Julia Krajewski on Amande de B'Neville; Germany	Tom McEwen on Toledo de Kerser; Great Britain	Andrew Hoy on Vassily de Lassos; Australia
Team eventing	Great Britain; Laura Collett on London 52; Tom McEwen on Toledo de Kerser; Oliver Townend on Ballaghmore Class	Australia; Kevin McNab on Don Quidam; Andrew Hoy on Vassily de Lassos; Shane Rose on Virgil	France; Nicolas Touzaint on Absolut Gold; Karim Laghouag on Triton Fontaine; Christopher Six on Totem de Brecey
Individual jumping	Ben Maher on Explosion W Great Britain	Peder Fredricson on All In; Sweden	Maikel van der Vleuten on Beauville Z Netherlands
Team jumping	Sweden; Henrik von Eckermann on King Edward; Malin Baryard-Johnsson on Indiana; Peder Fredricson on All In	United States; Laura Kraut on Baloutinue; Jessica Springsteen on Don Juan van de Donkhoeve; McLain Ward on Contagious	Belgium; Pieter Devos on Claire Z Jérôme Guery on Quel Homme de Hus; Grégory Wathelet on Nevados S

== See also ==
- Equestrian at the 2018 Asian Games
- Equestrian at the 2018 Summer Youth Olympics
- Equestrian at the 2019 Pan American Games
- Equestrian at the 2020 Summer Paralympics
- Equestrian at the 2022 World Cup in Denmark
