= Sweden at the 2020 Summer Olympics =

- IOC code: SWE
- NOC: Swedish Olympic Committee
- Website: www.sok.se (in Swedish and English)

in Tokyo, Japan 23 July 2021 – 8 August 2021
- Competitors: 136 in 22 sports
- Flag bearers (opening): Sara Algotsson Ostholt; Max Salminen
- Flag bearer (closing): Peder Fredricson
- Medals Ranked 23rd: Gold 3 Silver 6 Bronze 0 Total 9

Summer Olympics appearances (overview)
- 1896; 1900; 1904; 1908; 1912; 1920; 1924; 1928; 1932; 1936; 1948; 1952; 1956; 1960; 1964; 1968; 1972; 1976; 1980; 1984; 1988; 1992; 1996; 2000; 2004; 2008; 2012; 2016; 2020; 2024; 2028

Other related appearances
- 1906 Intercalated Games

Sweden competed at the 2020 Summer Olympics in Tokyo. Originally scheduled to take place from 24 July to 9 August 2020, the Games were postponed to 23 July to 8 August 2021, because of the COVID-19 pandemic. Swedish athletes have competed at every Summer Olympic Games, with the exception of the 1904 Summer Olympics in St. Louis.

Winning gold in three events, it was the most gold medals won by Sweden in the Summer Olympics since the 2004 Games in Athens. The overall 9 medal haul was lower than the three preceding Olympic Games however. With Daniel Ståhl and Simon Pettersson winning gold and silver respectively in Men's discus throw, it was the first double for Sweden in an athletics event since the 1948 Olympics.

== Medalists ==
Medal	Name	Sport	Event	Date
Gold	Daniel Ståhl	Athletics	Men's discus throw	31 July
Gold	Armand Duplantis	Athletics	Men's pole vault	3 August
Gold	Malin Baryard-Johnsson; Henrik von Eckermann; Peder Fredricson	Equestrian	Team jumping	7 August
Silver	Simon Pettersson	Athletics	Men's discus throw	31 July
Silver	Sarah Sjöström	Swimming	Women's 50 metre freestyle	1 August
Silver	Josefin Olsson	Sailing	Women's laser radial	1 August
Silver	Fredrik Bergström; Anton Dahlberg	Sailing	Men's 470	4 August
Silver	Peder Fredricson	Equestrian	Individual jumping	4 August
Silver	Sweden women's national football team: Hedvig Lindahl; Jonna Andersson; Emma Kullberg; Hanna Glas; Hanna Bennison; Magdalena Eriksson; Madelen Janogy; Lina Hurtig; Kosovare Asllani; Sofia Jakobsson; Stina Blackstenius; Jennifer Falk; Amanda Ilestedt; Nathalie Björn; Olivia Schough; Filippa Angeldal; Caroline Seger; Fridolina Rolfö; Anna Anvegård; Julia Roddar; Rebecka Blomqvist; Zećira Mušović	Football	Women's tournament	6 August

== Competitors ==
The following is the list of number of competitors participating in the Games.

Sport	Men	Women	Total
Archery	0	1	1
Athletics	12	9	21
Badminton	1	0	1
Boxing	1	1	2
Canoeing	2	1	3
Cycling	0	1	1
Diving	0	1	1
Equestrian	4	8	12
Football	0	22	22
Golf	2	2	4
Gymnastics	1	1	2
Handball	15	15	30
Judo	3	1	4
Rowing	0	1	1
Sailing	5	4	9
Shooting	1	0	1
Skateboarding	1	0	1
Swimming	4	6	10
Table tennis	3	2	5
Tennis	0	1	1
Weightlifting	0	1	1
Wrestling	1	2	3
Total	56	80	136

SOC lists 138 participants on their webpage. Their count includes Emilia Fahlin in road cycling who withdrew due to lack of form before the games started and Jon Persson, reserve in men's table tennis team.

== Archery ==
One Swedish archer qualified for the women's individual recurve by securing one of three remaining spots available in the secondary tournament at the 2019 World Archery Championships in 's-Hertogenbosch, Netherlands. Christine Bjerendal was selected on July 8, 2021.

Athlete	Event	Ranking round		Round of 64	Round of 32	Round of 16	Quarterfinals	Semifinals	Final / BM	
Athlete	Event	Score	Seed	Opposition Score	Opposition Score	Opposition Score	Opposition Score	Opposition Score	Opposition Score	Rank
Christine Bjerendal	Women's individual	622	55	Rebagliati (ITA); L 2–6	Did not advance					

== Athletics ==
Swedish athletes further achieved the entry standards, either by qualifying time or by world ranking, in the following track and field events (up to a maximum of 3 athletes in each event):

On 20 November 2019, race walker Perseus Karlström, world discus throw champion Daniel Ståhl, and American-born pole vaulter Armand Duplantis were officially named to the first batch of nominated Swedish athletes for the Games, with two-time Olympians Kim Amb (men's javelin throw) and Angelica Bengtsson (women's pole vault) joining them as part of the next batch two months later. Seven additional athletes were added to the nation's athletics roster for the Games on 24 March 2021, with marathon runner Carolina Wikström joining them one month later. Meraf Bahta and Sarah Lahti were added to the squad June 10. The athletics squad was completed with the addition of five athletes on 30 June 2021 and one final athlete on July 8.

Key

- Note–Ranks given for track events are within the athlete's heat only
- Q = Qualified for the next round
- q = Qualified for the next round as a fastest loser or, in field events, by position without achieving the qualifying target
- NR = National record
- N/A = Round not applicable for the event
- Bye = Athlete not required to compete in round

Track & road events
Men

Athlete	Event	Heat		Semifinal		Final	
Athlete	Event	Result	Rank	Result	Rank	Result	Rank
Andreas Kramer	800 m	1:46.44	5	Did not advance			
Kalle Berglund	1500 m	3:49.43	12	Did not advance			
Erik Blomberg	3000 m steeplechase	8:39.57	13	—N/a		Did not advance	
Vidar Johansson	3000 m steeplechase	8:32.86	10	—N/a		Did not advance	
Simon Sundström	3000 m steeplechase	8:29.84	11	—N/a		Did not advance	
Perseus Karlström	20 km walk	—N/a				1:22:29	9

Women

Athlete	Event	Final	
Athlete	Event	Result	Rank
Meraf Bahta	10000 m	32:10.49	18
Sarah Lahti	10000 m	DNF	
Carolina Wikström	Marathon	2:33:19	22

Field events
Men

Athlete	Event	Qualification		Final	
Athlete	Event	Distance	Position	Distance	Position
Thobias Montler	Long jump	8.01	8 q	8.08	7
Armand Duplantis	Pole vault	5.75	3 Q	6.02	1st place, gold medalist(s)
Wictor Petersson	Shot put	19.73	28	Did not advance	
Simon Pettersson	Discus throw	64.18	7 Q	67.39	2nd place, silver medalist(s)
Daniel Ståhl	Discus throw	66.12	1 Q	68.90	1st place, gold medalist(s)
Kim Amb	Javelin throw	82.40	12 q	79.69	11

Women

Athlete	Event	Qualification		Final	
Athlete	Event	Distance	Position	Distance	Position
Khaddi Sagnia	Long jump	6.76	7 Q	6.67	9
Erika Kinsey	High jump	1.93	15	Did not advance	
Maja Nilsson	High jump	1.95	=11 Q	1.84	13
Angelica Bengtsson	Pole vault	4.55	12 q	4.50	13
Michaela Meijer	Pole vault	4.40	16	Did not advance	
Fanny Roos	Shot put	19.01	4 Q	18.91	7

== Badminton ==
Sweden entered one badminton player in men's singles based on the BWF Race to Tokyo Rankings as of 25 May 2021. Felix Burestedt was selected by SOC in May 2021.

Athlete	Event	Group Stage			Elimination	Quarterfinal	Semifinal	Final / BM	
Athlete	Event	Opposition Score	Opposition Score	Rank	Opposition Score	Opposition Score	Opposition Score	Opposition Score	Rank
Felix Burestedt	Men's singles	Chou T-c (TPE); L (12–21, 11–21)	Yang (CAN); W (21–12, 21–17)	2	Did not advance				

== Boxing ==
Agnes Alexiusson qualified for a spot in the women's lightweight division at the 2020 European Qualification Tournament in Villebon-sur-Yvette, France. She was selected for the games by SOC a few days later, on June 10. Adam Chartoi was added June 30th.

Athlete	Event	Round of 32	Round of 16	Quarterfinals	Semifinals	Final	
Athlete	Event	Opposition Result	Opposition Result	Opposition Result	Opposition Result	Opposition Result	Rank
Adam Chartoi	Men's middleweight	Verón (ARG); L 0–5	Did not advance				
Agnes Alexiusson	Women's lightweight	Wu S-y (TPE); L 1–4	Did not advance				

== Canoeing ==
=== Slalom ===
Sweden qualified one canoeist for the men's K-1 class by finishing in the top eighteen at the 2019 ICF Canoe Slalom World Championships in La Seu d'Urgell, Spain. Erik Holmer was selected in June 2021.

Athlete	Event	Preliminary						Semifinal		Final	
Athlete	Event	Run 1	Rank	Run 2	Rank	Best	Rank	Time	Rank	Time	Rank
Erik Holmer	Men's K-1	100.36	18	94.91	12	94.91	16 Q	98.45	10 Q	148.59	9

=== Sprint ===
Sweden qualified a single boat in the women's K-1 500 m for the Games by finishing sixth in the final race at the 2019 ICF Canoe Sprint World Championships in Szeged, Hungary. On 20 November 2019, Rio 2016 kayaker Linnea Stensils was officially selected to the Swedish roster for the Games, with Petter Menning joining her in May 2021.

Athlete	Event	Heats		Quarterfinals		Semifinals		Final	
Athlete	Event	Time	Rank	Time	Rank	Time	Rank	Time	Rank
Petter Menning	Men's K-1 200 m	34.698	1 SF	Bye		35.149	3 FA	35.562	6
Linnea Stensils	Women's K-1 200 m	41.109	3 QF	41.313	1 SF	38.858	=4 FA	39.287	5
Linnea Stensils	Women's K-1 500 m	1:48.144	1 SF	Bye		1:51.902	1 FA	1:53.600	5

Qualification Legend: QF = Qualify to quarterfinal; SF = Qualify to semifinal; FA = Qualify to final (medal); FB = Qualify to final B (non-medal)

== Cycling ==
=== Road ===
Sweden qualified one rider each to compete in the men's and women's Olympic road race, by virtue of his top 50 national finish (for men) and her top 100 individual finish (for women) in the UCI World Ranking. Two-time Olympian Emilia Fahlin was officially selected to the Swedish roster for the Games in April 2021. A week before the Games started, she withdrew due to not being in sufficiently good form to be able to compete for a medal.

Athlete	Event	Time	Rank
Emilia Fahlin	Women's road race	Did not start	
Emilia Fahlin	Women's time trial	Did not start	

=== Mountain biking ===
Sweden qualified one female mountain biker, based on the 2019 UCI Mountain Bike World Championships. Reigning Olympic champion Jenny Rissveds was selected in May 2021.

Athlete	Event	Time	Rank
Jenny Rissveds	Women's cross-country	1:21:28	14

== Diving ==
Emma Gullstrand qualified through her placement in women's springboard at the 2021 FINA Diving World Cup in Tokyo, Japan. She was selected by SOC on June 30, 2021.

Athlete	Event	Preliminary		Semifinal		Final	
Athlete	Event	Points	Rank	Points	Rank	Points	Rank
Emma Gullstrand	Women's 3 m springboard	289.65	12 Q	288.85	13	Did not advance	

== Equestrian ==
Swedish equestrians qualified a full squad each in the team dressage and jumping competitions by virtue of a top-six finish at the 2018 FEI World Equestrian Games in Tryon, North Carolina, United States. The eventing riders were added to the squad by winning the bronze medal and finishing second among those eligible for Olympic qualification at the 2019 European Championships in Luhmühlen, Germany. Four athletes, including one reserve, were selected by the SOC for the jumping events on June 21, 2021. Dressage and eventing teams, including reserves as well, were selected by the SOC on June 28, 2021.

=== Dressage ===
Antonia Ramel and Brother de Jeu have been named the traveling alternates. Antonia Ramel got called up following the withdrawal of Patrik Kittel due to a horse injury two days prior to the competition.

Athlete	Horse	Event	Grand Prix		Grand Prix Special		Grand Prix Freestyle		Overall	
Athlete	Horse	Event	Score	Rank	Score	Rank	Technical	Artistic	Score	Rank
Therese Nilshagen	Dante Weltino	Individual	75.140	12 Q	—N/a		79.721	14	79.721	14
Antonia Ramel	Brother de Jeu	Individual	68.540	35	—N/a		Did not advance			35
Juliette Ramel	Buriel	Individual	73.369	15 Q	—N/a		81.182	9	81.182	9
Therese Nilshagen; Antonia Ramel; Juliette Ramel	See above	Team	6969.0	6 Q	7210.0	6	—N/a		7210.0	6

Qualification Legend: Q = Qualified for the final; q = Qualified for the final as a lucky loser

=== Eventing ===
Sara Algotsson Ostholt and Chicuelo have been named the traveling alternates.

Athlete	Horse	Event	Dressage		Cross-country			Jumping						Total	
Athlete	Horse	Event	Dressage		Cross-country			Qualifier			Final			Total	
Athlete	Horse	Event	Penalties	Rank	Penalties	Total	Rank	Penalties	Total	Rank	Penalties	Total	Rank	Penalties	Rank
Louise Romeike	Cato 60	Individual	28.00	=9	Eliminated			Did not advance							
Ludwig Svennerstål	Balham Mist	Individual	35.00	40	Withdrew			Did not advance							
Therese Viklund	Viscera	Individual	28.10	11	Eliminated			Did not advance							
Louise Romeike; Ludwig Svennerstål; Therese Viklund; Sara Algotsson Ostholt (s)	Cato 60; Balham Mist; Viscera; Chicuelo	Team	91.10	5	600.00+20.00	711.10	14	33.20	744.30	14	—N/a			744.30	14

- (s) – substituted before cross-country – 20 replacement penalties

=== Jumping ===
Rolf-Göran Bengtsson and Ermindo W have been named the traveling alternates.

Athlete	Horse	Event	Qualification		Final			Jump-off		
Athlete	Horse	Event	Penalties	Rank	Penalties	Time	Rank	Penalties	Time	Rank
Malin Baryard-Johnsson	Indiana	Individual	0	=1 Q	0	87.22	=1	0	40.76	5
Henrik von Eckermann	King Edward	Individual	0	=1 Q	0	85.48	=1	0	39.71	4
Peder Fredricson	All In	Individual	0	=1 Q	0	86.77	=1	0	38.02	2nd place, silver medalist(s)
Malin Baryard-Johnsson; Henrik von Eckermann; Peder Fredricson	See above	Team	0	1 Q	8	235.65	=1	0	122.90	1st place, gold medalist(s)

== Football ==
Summary

Key:

- A.E.T – After extra time.
- P – Match decided by penalty-shootout.

Team	Event	Group Stage				Quarterfinal	Semifinal	Final / BM	
Team	Event	Opposition Score	Opposition Score	Opposition Score	Rank	Opposition Score	Opposition Score	Opposition Score	Rank
Sweden women's	Women's tournament	United States; W 3–0	Australia; W 4–2	New Zealand; W 2–0	1 Q	Japan; W 3–1	Australia; W 1–0	Canada; L 1–1 ^{(2–3 P)}	2nd place, silver medalist(s)

=== Women's tournament ===
Sweden women's national football team qualified for the Games by securing a top-three finish among UEFA teams at the 2019 FIFA Women's World Cup in France, defeating Rio 2016 champion Germany in the quarterfinal round to reach the semifinals.

Team roster

The final squad of 22 athletes was announced on 29 June 2021.

Head coach: Peter Gerhardsson

No.	Pos.	Player	Date of birth (age)	Caps	Goals	Club
1	GK	Hedvig Lindahl	29 April 1983 (aged 38)	172	0	(Royal Spanish Football Federation) Atlético Madrid
2	DF	Jonna Andersson	2 January 1993 (aged 28)	56	1	(The Football Association) Chelsea
3	DF	Emma Kullberg	25 September 1991 (aged 29)	6	0	(Swedish Football Association) Häcken
4	DF	Hanna Glas	16 April 1993 (aged 28)	42	0	(German Football Association) Bayern Munich
5	MF	Hanna Bennison	16 October 2002 (aged 18)	8	0	(Swedish Football Association) Rosengård
6	DF	Magdalena Eriksson	8 September 1993 (aged 27)	70	8	(The Football Association) Chelsea
7	FW	Madelen Janogy	12 November 1995 (aged 25)	17	4	(Swedish Football Association) Hammarby
8	FW	Lina Hurtig	5 September 1995 (aged 25)	38	12	(Italian Football Federation) Juventus
9	FW	Kosovare Asllani	29 July 1989 (aged 31)	148	38	(Royal Spanish Football Federation) Real Madrid
10	FW	Sofia Jakobsson	23 April 1990 (aged 31)	123	23	(Royal Spanish Football Federation) Real Madrid
11	FW	Stina Blackstenius	5 February 1996 (aged 25)	64	17	(Swedish Football Association) Häcken
12	GK	Jennifer Falk	26 April 1993 (aged 28)	8	0	(Swedish Football Association) Häcken
13	DF	Amanda Ilestedt	17 January 1993 (aged 28)	41	4	(German Football Association) Bayern Munich
14	DF	Nathalie Björn	4 May 1997 (aged 24)	26	4	(Swedish Football Association) Rosengård
15	MF	Olivia Schough	11 March 1991 (aged 30)	83	11	(Swedish Football Association) Rosengård
16	MF	Filippa Angeldal	14 July 1997 (aged 24)	11	4	(Swedish Football Association) Häcken
17	MF	Caroline Seger (captain)	19 March 1985 (aged 36)	215	29	(Swedish Football Association) Rosengård
18	FW	Fridolina Rolfö	24 November 1993 (aged 27)	50	14	(German Football Association) VfL Wolfsburg
19	FW	Anna Anvegård	10 May 1997 (aged 24)	19	8	(Swedish Football Association) Rosengård
20	MF	Julia Roddar	16 February 1992 (aged 29)	9	0	(United States Soccer Federation) Washington Spirit
21	FW	Rebecka Blomqvist	24 July 1997 (aged 23)	8	1	(German Football Association) VfL Wolfsburg
22	GK	Zećira Mušović	26 May 1996 (aged 25)	5	0	(The Football Association) Chelsea

Group play

Pos	Team	Pld	W	D	L	GF	GA	GD	Pts	Qualification
1	Sweden	3	3	0	0	9	2	+7	9	Advance to knockout stage
2	United States	3	1	1	1	6	4	+2	4	Advance to knockout stage
3	Australia	3	1	1	1	4	5	−1	4	Advance to knockout stage
4	New Zealand	3	0	0	3	2	10	−8	0	

Source: TOCOG and FIFA
Rules for classification: Group stage tiebreakers
21 July 2021
17:30

Sweden	3–0	United States
Blackstenius 25', 54'; Hurtig 72'	Report (TOCOG); Report (FIFA)

Tokyo Stadium, Chōfu
Attendance: 0
Referee: Yoshimi Yamashita (Japan)

24 July 2021
17:30

Sweden	4–2	Australia
Rolfö 20', 63'; Hurtig 52'; Blackstenius 82'	Report (TOCOG); Report (FIFA)	Kerr 36', 48'

Saitama Stadium 2002, Saitama
Attendance: 0
Referee: Edina Alves Batista (Brazil)

27 July 2021
17:00

New Zealand	0–2	Sweden
	Report (TOCOG); Report (FIFA)	Anvegård 17'; Janogy 29'

Miyagi Stadium, Rifu
Attendance: 884
Referee: Laura Fortunato (Argentina)

Quarterfinal

30 July 2021
19:00

Sweden	3–1	Japan
Eriksson 7'; Blackstenius 53'; Asllani 68' (pen.)	Report (TOCOG); Report (FIFA)	Tanaka 23'

Saitama Stadium 2002, Saitama
Attendance: 0
Referee: Lucila Venegas (Mexico)

Semifinal

2 August 2021
20:00

Australia	0–1	Sweden
	Report (TOCOG); Report (FIFA)	Rolfö 46'

International Stadium Yokohama, Yokohama
Attendance: 0
Referee: Melissa Borjas (Honduras)

Gold Medal Match

6 August 2021
21:00

Sweden	1–1 (a.e.t.)	Canada
Blackstenius 34'	Report (TOCOG); Report (FIFA)	Fleming 68' (pen.)
Penalties
Asllani (penalty missed); Björn (penalty scored); Schough (penalty scored); Anvegård (penalty missed); Seger (penalty missed); Andersson (penalty missed)	2–3	(penalty scored) Fleming; (penalty missed) Lawrence; (penalty missed) Gilles; (penalty missed) Leon; (penalty scored) Rose; (penalty scored) Grosso

International Stadium Yokohama, Yokohama
Referee: Anastasia Pustovoitova (Russia)

== Golf ==
Sweden entered four golfers (two per gender) into the Olympic tournament. Alex Norén and Henrik Norlander qualified directly among the top 60 eligible players for the individual event based on the IGF World Rankings. Female golfers Anna Nordqvist and Madelene Sagström were added on 30 June 2021.

Athlete	Event	Round 1	Round 2	Round 3	Round 4	Total		
Athlete	Event	Score	Score	Score	Score	Score	Par	Rank
Alex Norén	Men's	67	67	72	67	273	−11	=16
Henrik Norlander	Men's	68	73	72	67	280	−4	=45
Anna Nordqvist	Women's	72	69	68	70	279	−5	=23
Madelene Sagström	Women's	66	68	71	72	277	−7	=20

== Gymnastics ==
=== Artistic ===
Sweden entered two artistic gymnasts into the Olympic competition. David Rumbutis and London 2012 Olympian Jonna Adlerteg received a spare berth each from the men's and women's apparatus events, respectively, as one of the highest-ranked gymnasts, neither part of the team nor qualified directly through the all-around, at the 2019 World Championships in Stuttgart, Germany.

Men

Athlete	Event	Qualification								Final							
Athlete	Event	Apparatus						Total	Rank	Apparatus						Total	Rank
Athlete	Event	F	PH	R	V	PB	HB	Total	Rank	F	PH	R	V	PB	HB	Total	Rank
David Rumbutis	All-around	12.166	12.033	11.200	12.716	11.733	12.533	72.765	61	Did not advance							

Women

Athlete	Event	Qualification						Final					
Athlete	Event	Apparatus				Total	Rank	Apparatus				Total	Rank
Athlete	Event	V	UB	BB	F	Total	Rank	V	UB	BB	F	Total	Rank
Jonna Adlerteg	Uneven bars	—N/a	14.533	—N/a		14.533	12	Did not advance					

== Handball ==
Summary

Key:

- ET: After extra time
- P – Match decided by penalty-shootout.

Team	Event	Group Stage						Quarterfinal	Semifinal	Final / BM	
Team	Event	Opposition Score	Opposition Score	Opposition Score	Opposition Score	Opposition Score	Rank	Opposition Score	Opposition Score	Opposition Score	Rank
Sweden men's	Men's tournament	Bahrain; W 32–31	Japan; W 28–26	Portugal; W 29–28	Egypt; L 22–27	Denmark; W 33–30	3 Q	Spain; L 33–34	Did not advance		5
Sweden women's	Women's tournament	Spain; W 31–24	(International Olympic Committee) ROC; W 36–24	France; D 28–28	Brazil; W 34–31	Hungary; L 23–26	1 Q	South Korea; W 39–30	France; L 27–29	Norway; L 19–36	4

=== Men's tournament ===
Sweden men's national handball team qualified for the Olympics by securing a top-two finish at the Berlin leg of the 2020 IHF Olympic Qualification Tournament.

Team roster

The squad was announced on 18 June 2021. Anton Lindskog was added after the squad limit was increased from 14 to 15 players.

Head coach: (Norway) Glenn Solberg

No.	Pos.	Name	Date of birth (age)	Height	App.	Goals	Club
2	LB	Jonathan Carlsbogård	19 April 1995 (aged 26)	1.95 m	18	37	(Germany) TBV Lemgo
5	P	Max Darj	27 September 1991 (aged 29)	1.92 m	78	62	(Germany) Bergischer HC
10	RW	Niclas Ekberg	23 December 1988 (aged 32)	1.91 m	183	758	(Germany) THW Kiel
11	RW	Daniel Pettersson	6 May 1992 (aged 29)	1.79 m	45	121	(Germany) SC Magdeburg
12	GK	Andreas Palicka	10 July 1986 (aged 35)	1.89 m	122	9	(Germany) Rhein-Neckar Löwen
15	LW	Hampus Wanne	10 December 1993 (aged 27)	1.85 m	47	155	(Germany) SG Flensburg-Handewitt
16	GK	Mikael Aggefors	20 January 1985 (aged 36)	1.91 m	35	0	(Denmark) Aalborg Håndbold
18	P	Fredric Pettersson	11 February 1989 (aged 32)	2.01 m	72	96	(France) Fenix Toulouse Handball
19	CB	Felix Claar	5 January 1997 (aged 24)	1.92 m	25	39	(Denmark) Aalborg Håndbold
22	LW	Lucas Pellas	28 August 1995 (aged 25)	1.84 m	32	98	(France) Montpellier HB
23	RB	Albin Lagergren	11 September 1992 (aged 28)	1.86 m	63	185	(Germany) Rhein-Neckar Löwen
24	CB	Jim Gottfridsson	2 September 1992 (aged 28)	1.91 m	107	349	(Germany) SG Flensburg-Handewitt
27	LB	Oskar Sunnefeldt	21 April 1998 (aged 23)	1.98 m	13	14	(Germany) SC DHfK Leipzig
33	RB	Lukas Sandell	3 February 1997 (aged 24)	1.92 m	13	32	(Denmark) Aalborg Håndbold
66	P	Anton Lindskog	7 December 1993 (aged 27)	1.98 m	28	17	(Germany) SG Flensburg-Handewitt

Group play

Pos	Team	Pld	W	D	L	GF	GA	GD	Pts	Qualification
1	Denmark	5	4	0	1	174	139	+35	8 (Note: Denmark 2 Pts, +2 GD; Egypt 2 Pts, 0 GD, Sweden 2 Pts, −2 GD)	Quarter-finals
2	Egypt	5	4	0	1	154	134	+20	8	Quarter-finals
3	Sweden	5	4	0	1	144	142	+2	8	Quarter-finals
4	Bahrain	5	1	0	4	129	149	−20	2 (Note: Bahrain 2 Pts, +1 GD; Portugal 2 Pts, 0 GD, Japan 2 Pts, −1 GD)	Quarter-finals
5	Portugal	5	1	0	4	143	156	−13	2	
6	Japan (H)	5	1	0	4	146	170	−24	2	

Source: Tokyo 2020 and IHF
Rules for classification: 1) Points; 2) Head-to-head points; 3) Head-to-head goal difference; 4) Head-to-head goals scored; 5) Goal difference; 6) Goals scored; 7) Draw.
(H) Hosts
Notes:

24 July 2021; 14:15	Sweden	32–31	Bahrain	Yoyogi National Gymnasium, Tokyo; Referees: Brunner, Salah (SUI)
24 July 2021; 14:15	Wanne 13	(16–18)	Habib 6	Yoyogi National Gymnasium, Tokyo; Referees: Brunner, Salah (SUI)
24 July 2021; 14:15	1× (yellow card) 3× (suspension)	Report	1× (yellow card) 5× (suspension)	Yoyogi National Gymnasium, Tokyo; Referees: Brunner, Salah (SUI)

26 July 2021; 21:30	Japan	26–28	Sweden	Yoyogi National Gymnasium, Tokyo; Referees: Lah, Sok (SLO)
26 July 2021; 21:30	Motoki 6	(14–17)	Wanne 8	Yoyogi National Gymnasium, Tokyo; Referees: Lah, Sok (SLO)
26 July 2021; 21:30	1× (yellow card) 4× (suspension)	Report	1× (yellow card) 1× (suspension)	Yoyogi National Gymnasium, Tokyo; Referees: Lah, Sok (SLO)

28 July 2021; 11:00	Sweden	29–28	Portugal	Yoyogi National Gymnasium, Tokyo; Referees: Raluy, Sabroso (ESP)
28 July 2021; 11:00	Ekberg 9	(14–14)	three players 4	Yoyogi National Gymnasium, Tokyo; Referees: Raluy, Sabroso (ESP)
28 July 2021; 11:00	1× (yellow card) 2× (suspension)	Report	1× (yellow card) 6× (suspension)	Yoyogi National Gymnasium, Tokyo; Referees: Raluy, Sabroso (ESP)

30 July 2021; 16:15	Sweden	22–27	Egypt	Yoyogi National Gymnasium, Tokyo; Referees: Bonaventura, Bonaventura (FRA)
30 July 2021; 16:15	Pellas 7	(9–13)	Sanad 6	Yoyogi National Gymnasium, Tokyo; Referees: Bonaventura, Bonaventura (FRA)
30 July 2021; 16:15	2× (yellow card) 2× (suspension)	Report	2× (suspension)	Yoyogi National Gymnasium, Tokyo; Referees: Bonaventura, Bonaventura (FRA)

1 August 2021; 21:30	Denmark	30–33	Sweden	Yoyogi National Gymnasium, Tokyo; Referees: Schulze, Tönnies (GER)
1 August 2021; 21:30	Gidsel, J. Hansen 5	(13–17)	Carlsbogård, Sandell 6	Yoyogi National Gymnasium, Tokyo; Referees: Schulze, Tönnies (GER)
1 August 2021; 21:30	3× (yellow card) 2× (suspension)	Report	2× (yellow card) 6× (suspension)	Yoyogi National Gymnasium, Tokyo; Referees: Schulze, Tönnies (GER)

Quarterfinal

3 August 2021; 13:15	Sweden	33–34	Spain	Yoyogi National Gymnasium, Tokyo; Referees: Schulze, Tönnies (GER)
3 August 2021; 13:15	Wanne 10	(20–18)	Gómez 8	Yoyogi National Gymnasium, Tokyo; Referees: Schulze, Tönnies (GER)
3 August 2021; 13:15	1× (yellow card) 4× (suspension)	Report	2× (yellow card) 3× (suspension)	Yoyogi National Gymnasium, Tokyo; Referees: Schulze, Tönnies (GER)

=== Women's tournament ===
Sweden women's national handball team qualified for the Olympics by securing a top-two finish at the Llíria leg of the 2020 IHF Olympic Qualification Tournament.

Team roster

The squad was announced on 18 June 2021. Nina Dano was added after the squad limit was increased from 14 to 15 players. On 21 July, four days before the tournament started, Isabelle Andersson was replaced by Johanna Westberg, because of a knee injury during preparations.

Head coach: Tomas Axnér

No.	Pos.	Name	Date of birth (age)	Height	App.	Goals	Club
1	GK	Johanna Bundsen	3 June 1991 (aged 30)	1.85 m	95	1	(Denmark) København Håndbold
6	CB	Carin Strömberg	10 July 1993 (aged 28)	1.84 m	103	127	(France) Nantes Atlantique Handball
7	P	Linn Blohm	20 May 1992 (aged 29)	1.80 m	113	303	(Hungary) Győri Audi ETO KC
8	LB	Jamina Roberts	28 May 1990 (aged 31)	1.76 m	177	377	(Sweden) IK Sävehof
9	CB	Melissa Petrén	18 January 1995 (aged 26)	1.73 m	29	64	(Denmark) København Håndbold
10	RW	Mathilda Lundström	20 December 1996 (aged 24)	1.64 m	47	55	(Sweden) IK Sävehof
14	LB	Johanna Westberg	6 April 1990 (aged 31)	1.87 m	71	132	(Denmark) Nykøbing Falster HK
16	GK	Jessica Ryde	18 May 1994 (aged 27)	1.85 m	23	0	(Denmark) Herning-Ikast Håndbold
17	RB	Nina Dano	12 June 2000 (aged 21)	1.72 m	14	16	(Denmark) HH Elite
19	P	Anna Lagerquist	16 October 1993 (aged 27)	1.75 m	69	102	(Russia) Rostov-Don
23	RB	Emma Lindqvist	17 September 1997 (aged 23)	1.77 m	32	54	(Denmark) Herning-Ikast Håndbold
24	RW	Nathalie Hagman	19 July 1991 (aged 30)	1.67 m	165	519	(France) Nantes Atlantique Handball
29	LB	Kristin Thorleifsdóttir	13 January 1998 (aged 23)	1.82 m	16	32	(Denmark) Randers HK
38	LW	Elin Hansson	7 August 1996 (aged 24)	1.73 m	17	16	(Sweden) Skuru IK
42	CB	Jenny Carlson	17 April 1995 (aged 26)	1.72 m	5	14	(Denmark) Holstebro Håndbold

Group play

Pos	Team	Pld	W	D	L	GF	GA	GD	Pts	Qualification
1	Sweden	5	3	1	1	152	133	+19	7 (Note: Sweden 36–24 ROC)	Quarter-finals
2	ROC	5	3	1	1	148	149	−1	7	Quarter-finals
3	France	5	2	1	2	139	135	+4	5	Quarter-finals
4	Hungary	5	2	0	3	142	149	−7	4 (Note: Hungary 29–25 Spain)	Quarter-finals
5	Spain	5	2	0	3	135	142	−7	4	
6	Brazil	5	1	1	3	133	141	−8	3	

Source: Tokyo 2020 and IHF
Rules for classification: 1) Points; 2) Head-to-head points; 3) Head-to-head goal difference; 4) Head-to-head goals scored; 5) Goal difference; 6) Goals scored; 7) Draw.
Notes:

25 July 2021; 19:30	Spain	24–31	Sweden	Yoyogi National Gymnasium, Tokyo; Referees: Koo, Lee (KOR)
25 July 2021; 19:30	Pena 7	(9–13)	Hansson 6	Yoyogi National Gymnasium, Tokyo; Referees: Koo, Lee (KOR)
25 July 2021; 19:30	1× (yellow card) 3× (suspension)	Report	2× (suspension)	Yoyogi National Gymnasium, Tokyo; Referees: Koo, Lee (KOR)

27 July 2021; 14:15	Sweden	36–24	ROC	Yoyogi National Gymnasium, Tokyo; Referees: El-Saied, El-Saied (EGY)
27 July 2021; 14:15	Strömberg 8	(15–9)	Vedekhina 5	Yoyogi National Gymnasium, Tokyo; Referees: El-Saied, El-Saied (EGY)
27 July 2021; 14:15	1× (suspension)	Report	1× (yellow card) 4× (suspension)	Yoyogi National Gymnasium, Tokyo; Referees: El-Saied, El-Saied (EGY)

29 July 2021; 21:30	Sweden	28–28	France	Yoyogi National Gymnasium, Tokyo; Referees: Fonseca, Santos (POR)
29 July 2021; 21:30	Strömberg 7	(16–17)	Foppa 6	Yoyogi National Gymnasium, Tokyo; Referees: Fonseca, Santos (POR)
29 July 2021; 21:30	1× (yellow card) 3× (suspension)	Report	1× (yellow card) 4× (suspension)	Yoyogi National Gymnasium, Tokyo; Referees: Fonseca, Santos (POR)

31 July 2021; 16:15	Brazil	31–34	Sweden	Yoyogi National Gymnasium, Tokyo; Referees: Koo, Lee (KOR)
31 July 2021; 16:15	Do Nascimento 7	(13–15)	Hansson, Roberts 6	Yoyogi National Gymnasium, Tokyo; Referees: Koo, Lee (KOR)
31 July 2021; 16:15	1× (yellow card) 4× (suspension)	Report	5× (suspension)	Yoyogi National Gymnasium, Tokyo; Referees: Koo, Lee (KOR)

2 August 2021; 16:15	Hungary	26–23	Sweden	Yoyogi National Gymnasium, Tokyo; Referees: García, Paolantoni (ARG)
2 August 2021; 16:15	five players 4	(15–15)	Carlson, Hagman 5	Yoyogi National Gymnasium, Tokyo; Referees: García, Paolantoni (ARG)
2 August 2021; 16:15	1× (suspension) 1× (red card)	Report	5× (suspension)	Yoyogi National Gymnasium, Tokyo; Referees: García, Paolantoni (ARG)

Quarterfinal

4 August 2021; 17:00	Sweden	39–30	South Korea	Yoyogi National Gymnasium, Tokyo; Referees: Alpaidze, Berezkina (RUS)
4 August 2021; 17:00	three players 6	(21–13)	Kang K. 8	Yoyogi National Gymnasium, Tokyo; Referees: Alpaidze, Berezkina (RUS)
4 August 2021; 17:00	1× (yellow card) 3× (suspension)	Report	4× (suspension)	Yoyogi National Gymnasium, Tokyo; Referees: Alpaidze, Berezkina (RUS)

Semifinal

6 August 2021; 17:00	France	29–27	Sweden	Yoyogi National Gymnasium, Tokyo; Referees: Lah, Sok (SLO)
6 August 2021; 17:00	Zaadi 7	(15–14)	Carlson, Westberg 6	Yoyogi National Gymnasium, Tokyo; Referees: Lah, Sok (SLO)
6 August 2021; 17:00	1× (yellow card) 6× (suspension)	Report	1× (yellow card) 4× (suspension) 1× (red card)	Yoyogi National Gymnasium, Tokyo; Referees: Lah, Sok (SLO)

Bronze medal game

8 August 2021; 11:00	Norway	36–19	Sweden	Yoyogi National Gymnasium, Tokyo; Referees: Alpaidze, Berezkina (RUS)
8 August 2021; 11:00	Brattset Dale, Mørk 8	(19–7)	Carlson, Westberg 4	Yoyogi National Gymnasium, Tokyo; Referees: Alpaidze, Berezkina (RUS)
8 August 2021; 11:00	1× (yellow card) 3× (suspension)	Report	3× (suspension)	Yoyogi National Gymnasium, Tokyo; Referees: Alpaidze, Berezkina (RUS)

== Judo ==
Four Swedish athletes have qualified in judo based on the world rankings released in June 2021. The Swedish Olympic Committee selected athletes Tommy Macias, in men's 73 kg, Marcus Nyman in men's 90 kg and Anna Bernholm, in women's 70 kg, in advance as they expected them to qualify. Robin Pacek in men's 81 kg was added to the squad in June 2021.

Athlete	Event	Round of 64	Round of 32	Round of 16	Quarterfinals	Semifinals	Repechage	Final / BM	
Athlete	Event	Opposition Result	Opposition Result	Opposition Result	Opposition Result	Opposition Result	Opposition Result	Opposition Result	Rank
Tommy Macias	Men's −73 kg	Bye	Scvortov (UAE); W 10–01	Gjakova (KOS); L 00–11	Did not advance				
Robin Pacek	Men's −81 kg	Thaoubani (COM); W 10–00	Aprahamian (URU); W 10–00	Casse (BEL); L 01–11	Did not advance				
Marcus Nyman	Men's −90 kg	Bye	Finesse (SEY); W 10–00	Sherazadishvili (ESP); L 00–10	Did not advance				
Anna Bernholm	Women's −70 kg	Bye	Landolsi (TUN); W 10–00	Bellandi (ITA); L 01–11	Did not advance				

== Rowing ==
Sweden qualified one boat in the women's single sculls for the Games by finishing fourth in the A-final and securing the last of three berths available at the 2021 FISA European Olympic Qualification Regatta in Varese, Italy.

Athlete	Event	Heats		Repechage		Quarterfinals		Semifinals		Final	
Athlete	Event	Time	Rank	Time	Rank	Time	Rank	Time	Rank	Time	Rank
Lovisa Claesson	Women's single sculls	7:58.41	3 QF	Bye		8:16.99	4 SC/D	7:35.91	1 FC	7:41.07	14

Qualification Legend: FA=Final A (medal); FB=Final B (non-medal); FC=Final C (non-medal); FD=Final D (non-medal); FE=Final E (non-medal); FF=Final F (non-medal); SA/B=Semifinals A/B; SC/D=Semifinals C/D; SE/F=Semifinals E/F; QF=Quarterfinals; R=Repechage

== Sailing ==
Swedish sailors qualified one boat in each of the following classes through the 2018 Sailing World Championships, the class-associated Worlds, and the continental regattas.

On 20 November 2019, the Swedish Olympic Committee (SOK) officially selected the first three sailors to compete at the Tokyo 2020 regatta, namely London 2012 champion and Finn yachtsman Max Salminen and 470 crew members Fredrik Bergström and Anton Dahlberg. Dinghy sailors Jesper Stålheim (Laser) and Josefin Olsson (Laser Radial) were named to the second batch of nominated Swedish athletes for the Games on 31 January 2020. Nacra 17 crew Cecilia Jonsson and Emil Järudd joined them in April 2021, with the women's 470 crew (Bergström and Karlsson) completing the Swedish sailing squad one month later.

Men

Athlete	Event	Race											Net points	Final rank
Athlete	Event	1	2	3	4	5	6	7	8	9	10	M*	Net points	Final rank
Jesper Stålheim	Laser	22	11	1	20	4	17	11	9	~~29~~	13	EL	108	14
Max Salminen	Finn	8	~~12~~	7	8	12	8	4	2	11	12	18	90	9
Fredrik Bergström; Anton Dahlberg	470	1	~~15~~	8	5	6	11	1	5	3	1	4	43	2nd place, silver medalist(s)

Women

Athlete	Event	Race											Net points	Final rank
Athlete	Event	1	2	3	4	5	6	7	8	9	10	M*	Net points	Final rank
Josefin Olsson	Laser Radial	~~34~~	15	8	4	1	6	4	9	22	10	1	81	2nd place, silver medalist(s)
Olivia Bergström; Lovisa Karlsson	470	19^{†}	10	10	16	7	9	18	14	11	18	EL	111	14

Mixed

Athlete	Event	Race													Net points	Final rank
Athlete	Event	1	2	3	4	5	6	7	8	9	10	11	12	M*	Net points	Final rank
Emil Järudd; Cecilia Jonsson	Nacra 17	18	13	11	16	12	14	19^{†}	16	3	10	16	16	EL	144	14

M = Medal race; EL = Eliminated – did not advance into the medal race

== Shooting ==
Swedish shooters achieved quota places for the following events by virtue of their best finishes at the 2018 ISSF World Championships, the 2019 ISSF World Cup series, European Championships or Games, and European Qualifying Tournament, as long as they obtained a minimum qualifying score (MQS) by 31 May 2020. On 20 November 2019, skeet shooter and two-time Olympian Stefan Nilsson was officially selected to the Swedish roster for the Games.

Athlete	Event	Qualification		Final	
Athlete	Event	Points	Rank	Points	Rank
Stefan Nilsson	Men's skeet	119	23	Did not advance	

== Skateboarding ==
Oskar Rozenberg Hallberg qualified for the games by finishing top 16 in the Olympic world skateboarding rankings for men's park. The Swedish Olympic Committee selected him for the games in late May 2021.

Athlete	Event	Qualification		Final	
Athlete	Event	Points	Rank	Points	Rank
Oskar Rozenberg Hallberg	Men's park	56.66	17	Did not advance	

== Swimming ==
Swedish swimmers further achieved qualifying standards in the following events (up to a maximum of 2 swimmers in each event at the Olympic Qualifying Time (OQT), and potentially 1 at the Olympic Selection Time (OST)):

On 20 November 2019, multiple Olympic medalist and current world record holder Sarah Sjöström was officially selected to the Swedish roster for the Games, with fellow swimmers Louise Hansson (women's 100 m butterfly) and Erik Persson (men's 200 m breaststroke) joining her as part of the next batch two months later. Four more swimmers, including Rio 2016 Olympians Michelle Coleman and Sophie Hansson - were added to the squad in May 2021 based on their performances at the 2021 European Championships. Björn Seeliger in men's 50m freestyle, and Sara Junevik for the women's 4x100m freestyle relay team, were added to the Swedish swimming squad on June 30, 2021. Victor Johansson, participating in the men's 800 and 1500 m freestyle, was the last addition to the squad, added on July 8, 2021.

Men

Athlete	Event	Heat		Semifinal		Final	
Athlete	Event	Time	Rank	Time	Rank	Time	Rank
Robin Hanson	100 m freestyle	49.07	27	Did not advance			
Robin Hanson	200 m freestyle	1:47.02	23	Did not advance			
Victor Johansson	800 m freestyle	7:49.14	=10	—N/a		Did not advance	
Victor Johansson	1500 m freestyle	15:05.53	18	—N/a		Did not advance	
Erik Persson	200 m breaststroke	2:08.76	6 Q	2:08.76	8 Q	2:08.88	8
Björn Seeliger	50 m freestyle	22.19	23	Did not advance			

Women

Athlete	Event	Heat		Semifinal		Final	
Athlete	Event	Time	Rank	Time	Rank	Time	Rank
Michelle Coleman	50 m freestyle	24.84	20	Did not advance			
Michelle Coleman	100 m freestyle	53.53	12 Q	53.73	14	Did not advance	
Michelle Coleman	100 m backstroke	1:00.54	21	Did not advance			
Emelie Fast	100 m breaststroke	1:07.98	27	Did not advance			
Louise Hansson	100 m backstroke	Did not start					
Louise Hansson	100 m butterfly	56.97	6 Q	56.92	7 Q	56.22	5
Sophie Hansson	100 m breaststroke	1:05.66	4 Q	1:05.81	4 Q	1:06.07	6
Sophie Hansson	200 m breaststroke	2:23.82	12 Q	2:24.28	10	Did not advance	
Sarah Sjöström	50 m freestyle	24.26	4 Q	24.13	3 Q	24.07	2nd place, silver medalist(s)
Sarah Sjöström	100 m freestyle	52.91	5 Q	52.82	4 Q	52.68	5
Sarah Sjöström	100 m butterfly	56.18	3 Q	56.40	4 Q	56.91	7
Michelle Coleman; Sara Junevik^{[a]} Louise Hansson; Sophie Hansson; Sarah Sjöström	4 × 100 m freestyle relay	3:35.93	8 Q	—N/a		3:34.69	6
Michelle Coleman; Louise Hansson; Sophie Hansson; Sarah Sjöström	4 × 100 m medley relay	3:56.23	5 Q	—N/a		3:54.27	5

^{a} Swimmers who participated in the heats only.

== Table tennis ==
Sweden entered five athletes into the table tennis competition at the Games. The men's team secured a berth by advancing to the quarterfinal round of the 2020 World Olympic Qualification Event in Gondomar, Portugal, permitting a maximum of two starters to compete in the men's singles tournament. Meanwhile, Linda Bergström scored a second-match final triumph to book one of the five available places in the women's singles at the 2021 ITTF World Qualification Tournament in Doha, Qatar.

On 20 November 2019, table tennis player Mattias Falck was officially selected to the Swedish roster for the Games. In May 2021, Anton Källberg and Kristian Karlsson were also selected, and Jon Persson was listed as the reserve to the men's team. Christina Källberg was added to the squad in June 2021.

Athlete	Event	Preliminary	Round 1	Round 2	Round 3	Round of 16	Quarterfinals	Semifinals	Final / BM	
Athlete	Event	Opposition Result	Opposition Result	Opposition Result	Opposition Result	Opposition Result	Opposition Result	Opposition Result	Opposition Result	Rank
Mattias Falck	Men's singles	Bye			Assar (EGY); L 3–4	Did not advance				
Anton Källberg	Men's singles	Bye		Kumar (USA); W 4–0	Lin Y-j (TPE); L 1–4	Did not advance				
Mattias Falck; Anton Källberg; Kristian Karlsson	Men's team	Bye				United States; W 3–1	Japan; L 1–3	Did not advance		
Linda Bergström	Women's singles	Bye	Mukherjee (IND); L 3–4	Did not advance						
Christina Källberg	Women's singles	Bye	Shao (POR); L 3–4	Did not advance						

== Tennis ==
Rebecca Peterson qualified for women's singles based on the world ranking released in June 2021. The Swedish Olympic Committee had selected her in advance as they expected her to qualify.

Athlete	Event	Round of 64	Round of 32	Round of 16	Quarterfinals	Semifinals	Final / BM	
Athlete	Event	Opposition Score	Opposition Score	Opposition Score	Opposition Score	Opposition Score	Opposition Score	Rank
Rebecca Peterson	Women's singles	Sherif (EGY); W 7–5, 7–6^{(7–1)}	Rybakina (KAZ); L 2–6, 3–6	Did not advance				

== Weightlifting ==
Swedish weightlifters qualified for one quota places at the games, based on the Tokyo 2020 Rankings Qualification List of 11 June 2021. Patricia Strenius was selected to the squad in June 2021.

Athlete	Event	Snatch		Clean & Jerk		Total	Rank
Athlete	Event	Result	Rank	Result	Rank	Total	Rank
Patricia Strenius	Women's –76 kg	102	7	133	4	235	4

== Wrestling ==
Sweden qualified three wrestlers for each of the following classes into the Olympic competition. Two of them finished among the top six to book Olympic spots in the men's Greco-Roman 77 kg and women's freestyle (62 and 68 kg) at the 2019 World Championships, while an additional license was awarded to the Swedish wrestler, who progressed to the top two finals of the women's freestyle 53 kg at the 2021 European Olympic Qualification Tournament in Budapest, Hungary.

On 20 November 2019, Greco-Roman wrestling rookie Alex Bjurberg Kessidis and freestyle wrestler Henna Johansson were officially selected to the Swedish roster for the Games. Johansson's teammate and Rio 2016 bronze medalist Jenny Fransson was permanently removed from the team for the Games after testing positive for the banned steroid methyltestosterone.

Key:

- VT (ranking points: 5–0 or 0–5) – Victory by fall.
- VB (ranking points: 5–0 or 0–5) – Victory by injury (VF for forfeit, VA for withdrawal or disqualification)
- PP (ranking points: 3–1 or 1–3) – Decision by points – the loser with technical points.
- PO (ranking points: 3–0 or 0–3) – Decision by points – the loser without technical points.
- ST (ranking points: 4–0 or 0–4) – Great superiority – the loser without technical points and a margin of victory of at least 8 (Greco-Roman) or 10 (freestyle) points.
- SP (ranking points: 4–1 or 1–4) – Technical superiority – the loser with technical points and a margin of victory of at least 8 (Greco-Roman) or 10 (freestyle) points.

Freestyle

Athlete	Event	Round of 16	Quarterfinal	Semifinal	Repechage	Final / BM	
Athlete	Event	Opposition Result	Opposition Result	Opposition Result	Opposition Result	Opposition Result	Rank
Sofia Mattsson	Women's −53 kg	Vinesh (IND); L 1–3 ^{PP}	Did not advance				13
Henna Johansson	Women's −62 kg	Marwa (TUN); W 3–1 ^{PP}	Kawai (JPN); L 1–3 ^{PP}	Did not advance	Ovcharova (ROC); L 1–3 ^{PP}	Did not advance	7

Greco-Roman

Athlete	Event	Round of 16	Quarterfinal	Semifinal	Repechage	Final / BM	
Athlete	Event	Opposition Result	Opposition Result	Opposition Result	Opposition Result	Opposition Result	Rank
Alex Bjurberg Kessidis	Men's −77 kg	Huseynov (AZE); L 1–3 ^{PP}	Did not advance				11

== See also ==
- Sweden at the 2020 Summer Paralympics
