= Melbourne 3 day event =

Australian sporting competition

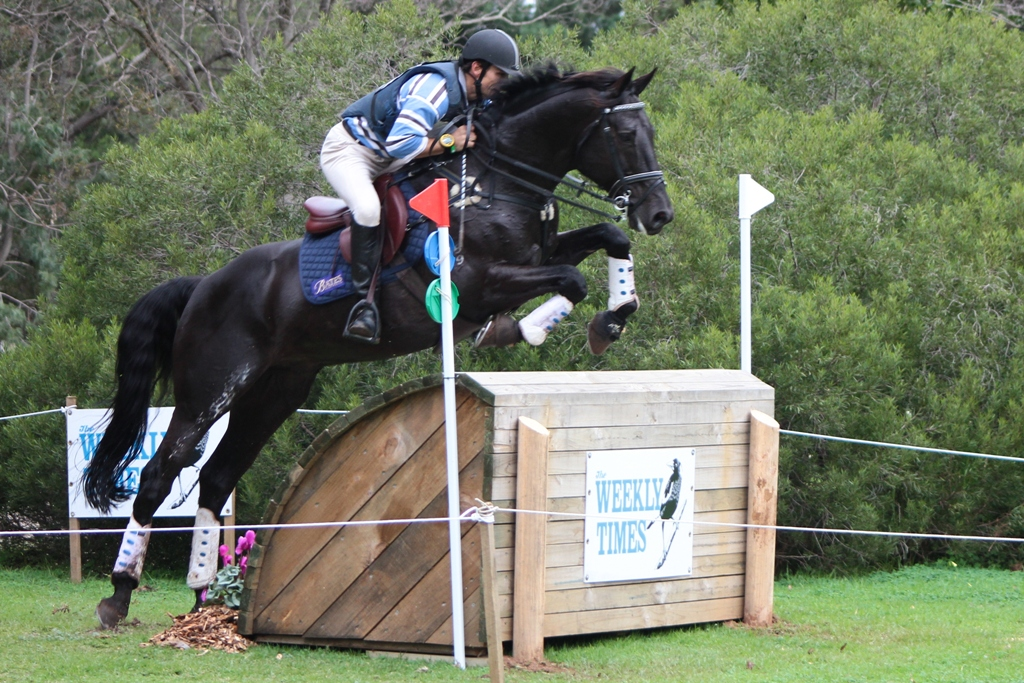
Shane Rose and Statford Novalis Competing at the 2010 Melbourne 3 Day Event

The Melbourne 3 Day Event is an equestrian event which comprises dressage, cross-country and show-jumping. It was first run in 1957, making it Australia's oldest horse trial and the second oldest in the world. The only older Event is Badminton in England. The Event was established shortly after the first Australian competed at the Melbourne Olympics as a proving ground for horses and riders to prepare for future Olympics.

The M3DE has also been a qualifier for the FEI World Cup Eventing since 2003. This class (the CIC-W***) offers Australian riders the opportunity to compete in the FEI World Cup, held annually in different locations around the world.

== Venue ==
In recent years, the Event has been held at Werribee Park National Equestrian Centre in Werribee, a western suburb of Melbourne. The venue is adjacent to Werribee Park, which includes the Werribee Park Mansion and the State Rose Garden. On Cross Country Day, the horses and riders wind their way through the Mansion Grounds and State Rose Garden, making M3DE one if the most picturesque spectacles in the world.

Werribee is one of 3 venues that the Event has run at over the years.

== Previous winners ==
Open - Advanced - CCI***

Year	Rider	Horse
1957	M. Barns	Dorian
1958	B. Jacobs	Dopey
1959	No Winner	No Winner
1960	B. McIntyre	Alpine
1961	B. Roycroft	Robin Hood
1962	B. Roycroft	Robin Hood
1963	B. Cobcroft	Robin Hood
1964	G. Barker	Nevermind
1965	E. Barker	Galway
1966	B. Roycroft	Avatar
1967	S. Harvey	Charilla
1968	R.Godfrey	King Hua
1969	E. Barker	Sammy
1970	E. Barker	Sammy
1971	R. Sands	Cypress Point
1972	E. Barker	Marksman
1973	D. Pigott	Hillstead
1974	B. Roycroft	Version
1975	D. Pigott	Hillstead
1976	P. Young	Metaluna
1977	P. Glennen	Rangefinder
1978	M. Bennett	Regal Reign
1979	M. Bennett	Regal Reign
1980	L. Prior-Palmer	Rippling Rumour
1981	Andrew Hoy	Davey
1982	C. Irving	Edgehill Charlie
1983	V. Roycroft	Faro
1984	L. Brodbeck	Montago Gold
1985	S. Keach	Trade Commissioner
1986	Andrew Hoy	Kiwi
1987	Andrew Hoy	Kiwi
1988	L. Hayward	Delatite Comic
1989	I. Stark	Foxy V
1990	Heath Ryan	Looking Good
1991	Andrew Hoy	Kiwi
1992	P. Cribb	Navarone
1993	P. Cribb	Navarone
1994	C. Barrett	Elbacee Masterpiece
1995	R. Brown	Mighty Heights
1996	J. Cooper	Falcon Ivory
1997	S. Tinney	Jeepster
1998	Shane Rose	It’s A Knockout
1999	C. Bates	Masterprint
2000	S. Tinney	Belcam Aava
2001	S. McLeod	Frederick Hunter
2002	D. Middleton	Willowbank Jack
2003	T. Boland	Limitless
2004	E. Anker	Balmoral Cavalier
2005	Megan Jones	Kirby Park Irish Jester
2006	Sonja Johnson	Ringwould Jaguar
2007	W. Schaeffer	Koyuna Sun Dancer
2008	Megan Jones	Kirby Park Irish Jester
2009	Megan Jones	Kirby Park Allofasudden
2010	Sonja Johnson	Ringwould Jaguar

CIC-W***

Year	Rider	Horse
2003	N. Roe Wondaree	Hooley Dooley
2004	Sonja Johnson	Ringwould Jaguar
2005	O. Bunn	GV Top Of The Line
2006	E. Armstrong	Voortrekker
2007	N. Siiankoski	Kolora Stud Archie
2008	W. Schaeffer	Koyuna Sun Dancer
