= Megan Jones (equestrian) =

Australian equestrian

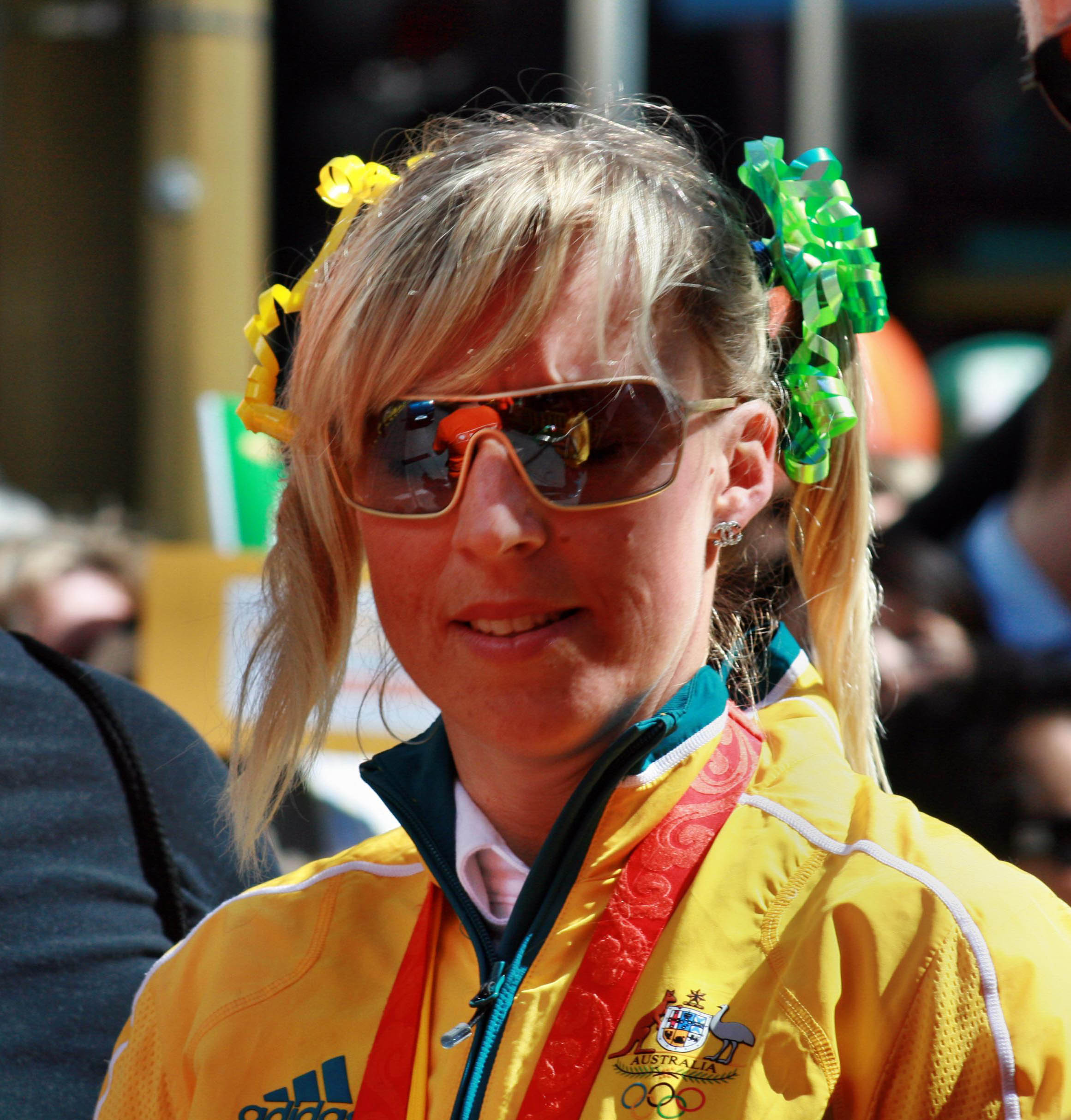
- 2008 Australian Olympic team - Megan Jones

Personal information
- Full name: Megan Victoria Jones
- Nickname: Blondie
- Nationality: Australian
- Born: 6 November 1976 (age 49) Adelaide, Australia
- Height: 167 cm (5 ft 6 in)
- Weight: 60 kg (132 lb)

Sport
- Country: Australia
- Sport: Equestrian
- Event: Eventing

Achievements and titles
- Olympic finals: Yes
Medal record
Equestrian
Olympic Games
Silver medal – second place	2008 Beijing	Team eventing
World Championships
Bronze medal – third place	2006 Aachen	Team eventing

Megan Jones (born 6 November 1976) is an Australian equestrian. She was a Silver Medalist at the 2008 Beijing Olympic Games.

Jones began riding at the age of 5, continued through her early years in Pony Club before hitting the international scene in 2003 at the World Cup Final. In 2005, she won Melbourne International Three Day Event riding three star on Kirby Park Irish Jester, then later in the same year won the four star at the 2005 Adelaide Horse Trials on the same mount and a second in the two star competition on another. Chosen to compete in the 2006 World Equestrian Games, she was on the bronze medal winning Australian Event Team, and finished 16th individually.

Jones won a silver medal in Beijing in 2008 riding Kirby Park Irish Jester in the team event, alongside countrymen Clayton Fredericks, his wife Lucinda Fredericks, Shane Rose and Sonja Johnson.

Jones owns Kirby Park Stud, in Hahndorf in the Adelaide hills. Along with Kirby Park Irish Jester and Kirby Park Irish Hallmark, her top horses have included Kirby Park Allofasudden, which was selected as a reserve in Beijing.
