= Kevin McNab =

Australian equestrian (born 1978)

Personal information
- Born: 21 February 1978 (age 48) Cairns, Queensland, Australia

Sport
- Country: Australia
- Sport: Equestrian
- Event: Eventing
- Club: Compton, Surrey, UK
Medal record
Equestrian
Representing Australia
Olympic Games
Silver medal – second place	2020 Tokyo	Team eventing

Kevin McNab (born 21 February 1978) is an Australian equestrian. He competed in the individual eventing and team eventing at the 2020 Summer Olympics in Tokyo. The team of Andrew Hoy on Vassily de Lassos, Shane Rose on Virgil and Kevin McNab on Don Quidam won silver. Riding on Don Quidam, McNab finished inside the top 15 in the individual eventing competition.

Since January 2010 McNab has had 279 starts and 21 wins in eventing. He has had 33 starts in jumping.

In 2013, his mount Clifton Pinot was found to have the banned substance reserpine in his system while competing at the Burghley International Horse Trials. He was eliminated from the competition. In 2014, McNab was cleared of the charges after an equine supplement supplier claimed responsibility.

At the Le Lion d'Angers World Championship, in October 2019, McNab was ranked 9th on Halo. He was eliminated when competing in the 2020 event.
