= Viklund =

Viklund is a Swedish surname. Notable people with the surname include:

- Andreas Viklund (born 1980), Swedish music producer, member of Lagoona
- Therese Viklund (born 1987), Swedish equestrian
- Tobias Viklund (born 1986), Swedish ice hockey player
