= Joanna Pawlak =

Polish equestrian

Personal information
- Nicknames: Asia, Joasia
- Born: 31 March 1991 (age 35)

Sport
- Country: Poland
- Sport: Equestrian
- Event: Eventing

Joanna Pawlak (born 31 March 1991) is a Polish equestrian. She represented Poland at the 2020 Summer Olympics and competed in Individual and Team Eventing on her horse Fantastic Freida. She was eliminated from the competition when her horse failed the final trot-up.
