= Małgorzata Cybulska =

Polish equestrian

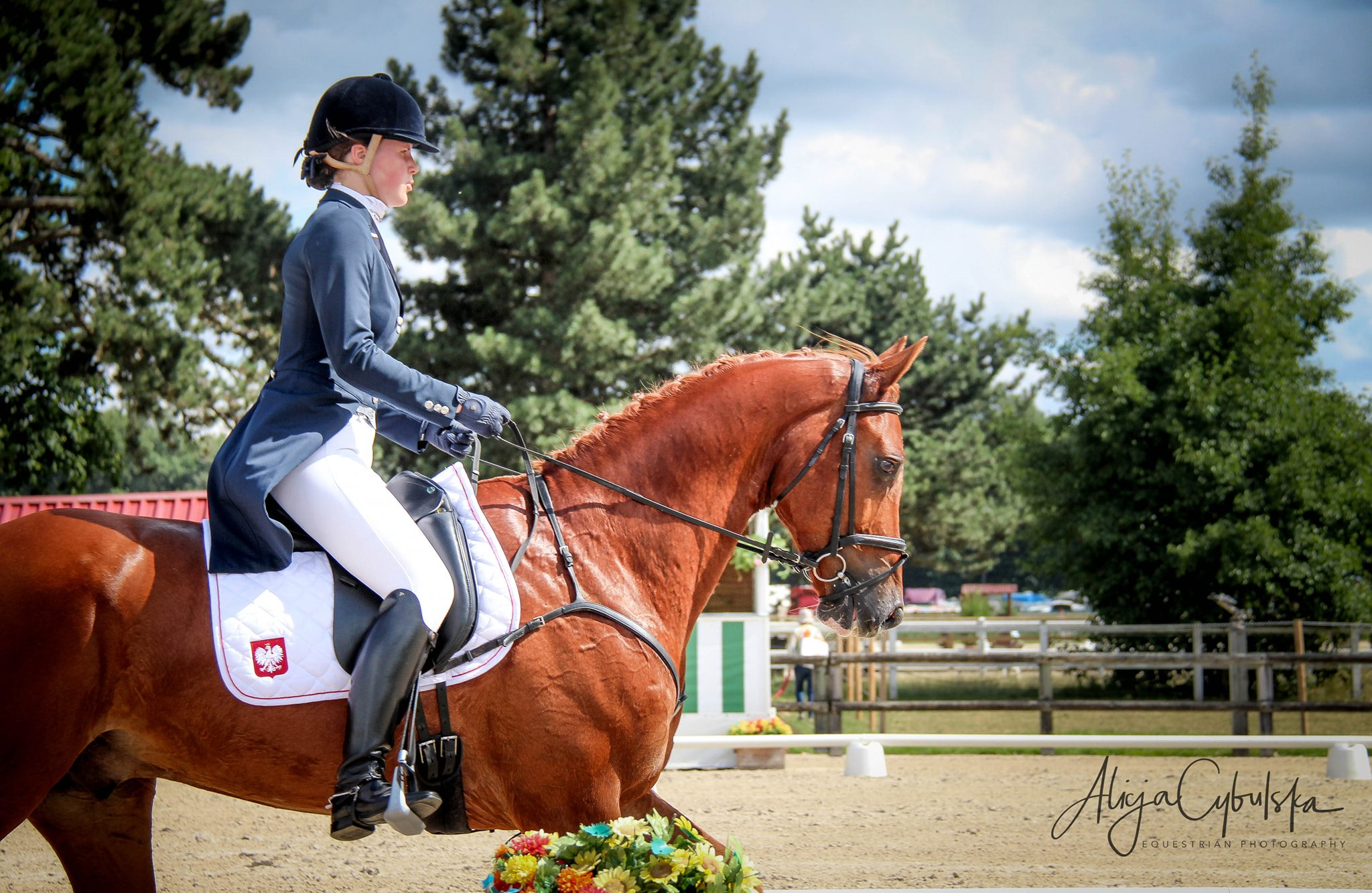
- Cybulska in 2019

Personal information
- Nickname: Gosia
- Born: 28 March 1998 (age 28)

Sport
- Country: Poland
- Sport: Equestrian
- Event: Eventing

Małgorzata Cybulska (born 28 March 1998) is a Polish equestrian. She represented Poland at the 2020 Summer Olympics and competed in Individual and Team Eventing on her horse Chenaro.

Cybulska suffered from discopathy and underwent a spinal operation in 2019.
