= Sonja Johnson =

Australian equestrian (born 1967)

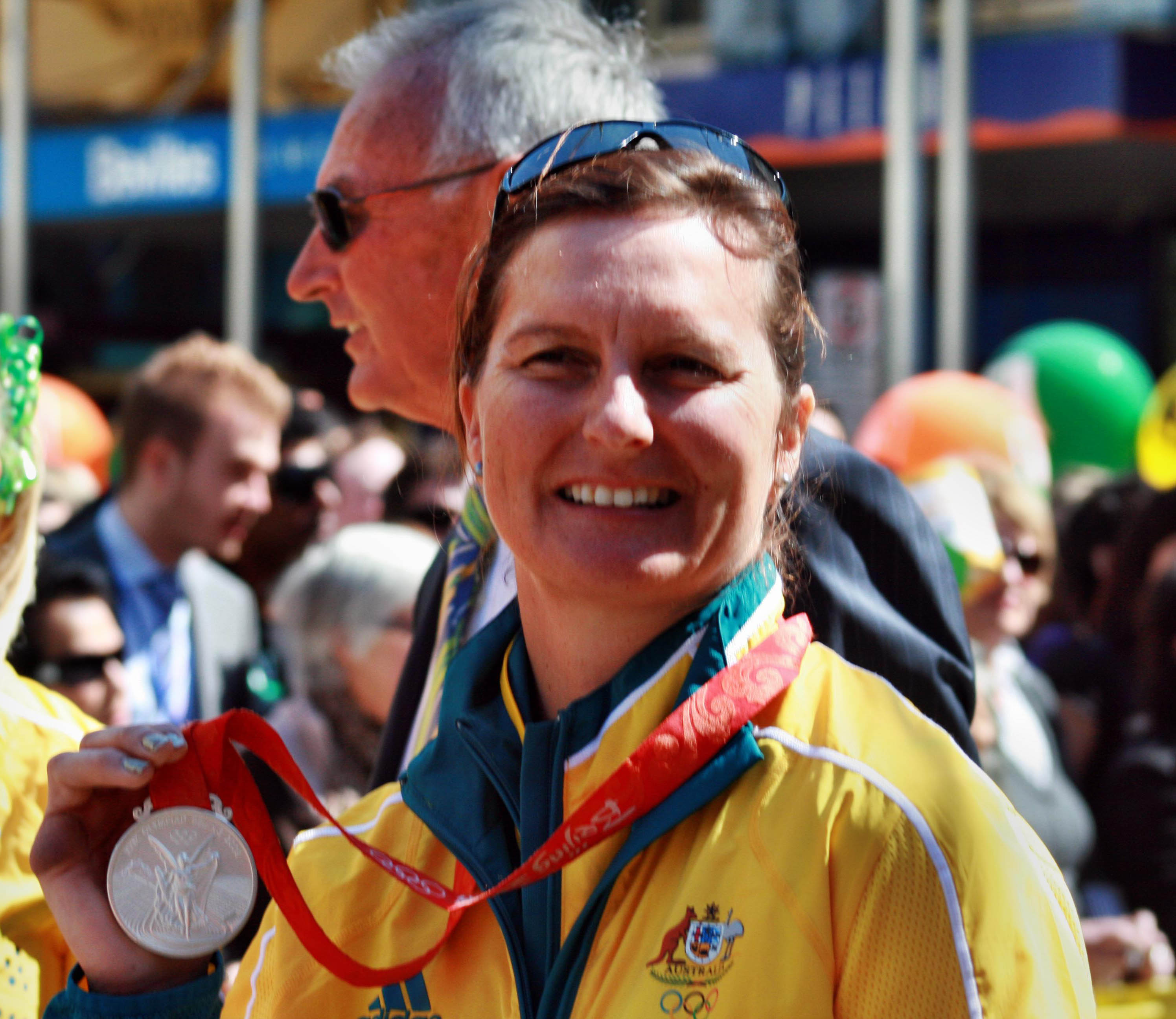

Personal information
- Born: 14 December 1967 (age 58) Albany, Western Australia

Sport
- Country: Australia
- Sport: Equestrian
- Event: Eventing
Medal record
Equestrian
Olympic Games
Silver medal – second place	2008 Beijing	Team eventing
World Championships
Bronze medal – third place	2006 Aachen	Team eventing

Sonja Johnson (born 14 December 1967 in Albany, Western Australia) is an Australian equestrian who won a silver medal at the 2008 Summer Olympics in Beijing as part of the three-day eventing team. The team consisted of Megan Jones, Clayton Fredericks, Lucinda Fredericks and Shane Rose

She grew up on a farm and says she began riding at the age of three to help muster cattle on the property. In 2006, she won the Melbourne 3-Day-Event on the horse Ringwould Jaguar.
