= Christopher Six =

French equestrian

Personal information
- Nationality: French
- Born: 12 December 1985 (age 40) Limours, France

Sport
- Sport: Equestrian
Medal record
Equestrian
Representing France
Olympic Games
Bronze medal – third place	2020 Tokyo	Team eventing

Christopher Six (born 12 December 1985) is a French equestrian. He competed in the individual eventing at the 2020 Summer Olympics.

== See also ==
- Totem de Brecey
