= Tokyo Equestrian Park =

Park in Japan

- 馬事公苑
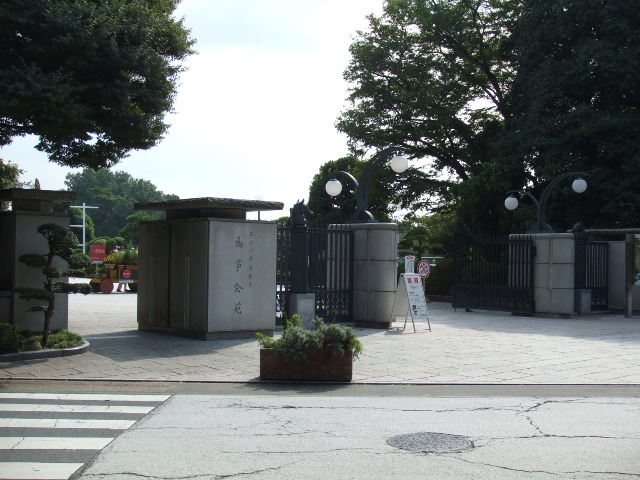
- The Main Gate of the Equestrian Park
- Interactive map of Tokyo Equestrian Park
- Address: 158-0098; 2 Chome-1-1 Kamiyoga; Setagaya, Tokyo; Japan
- Coordinates: 35.637°N 139.633°E
- Owner: Japan Racing Association
- Capacity: 9,300
- Field size: 180,000 m^{2}
- Public transit: Yoga Station

Construction
- Opened: 1940
- Expanded: 2019

Tenant
- 2026 Asian Games

The Tokyo Equestrian Park (馬事公苑, Bajikōen) is an equestrian sport venue located in Setagaya, Tokyo. The venue is owned by the Japan Racing Association and is a public park all year round, known familiarly as 'Horse Park'.

It was constructed in 1940 for the Olympics, but after the Games were cancelled, it was used for the promotion of equestrian events of all sorts. The Park also hosted a training facility for prospective jockeys until the Horseracing School was opened in 1982. Originally, this place would host the same events during the 1964 Summer Olympics, but technical issues took equestrian events to the city of Karuizawa in Nagano Prefecture. This venue hosted the equestrian events during the 2020 Summer Olympics.

In preparation for the 2020 Summer Olympics, the Equestrian Park was closed to the public in order to conduct renovations in 2016. Operations were moved to Utsunomiya in a limited capacity in 2017, and is scheduled to return to Setagaya in November 2023.
