= Julia Krajewski =

German equestrian (born 1988)

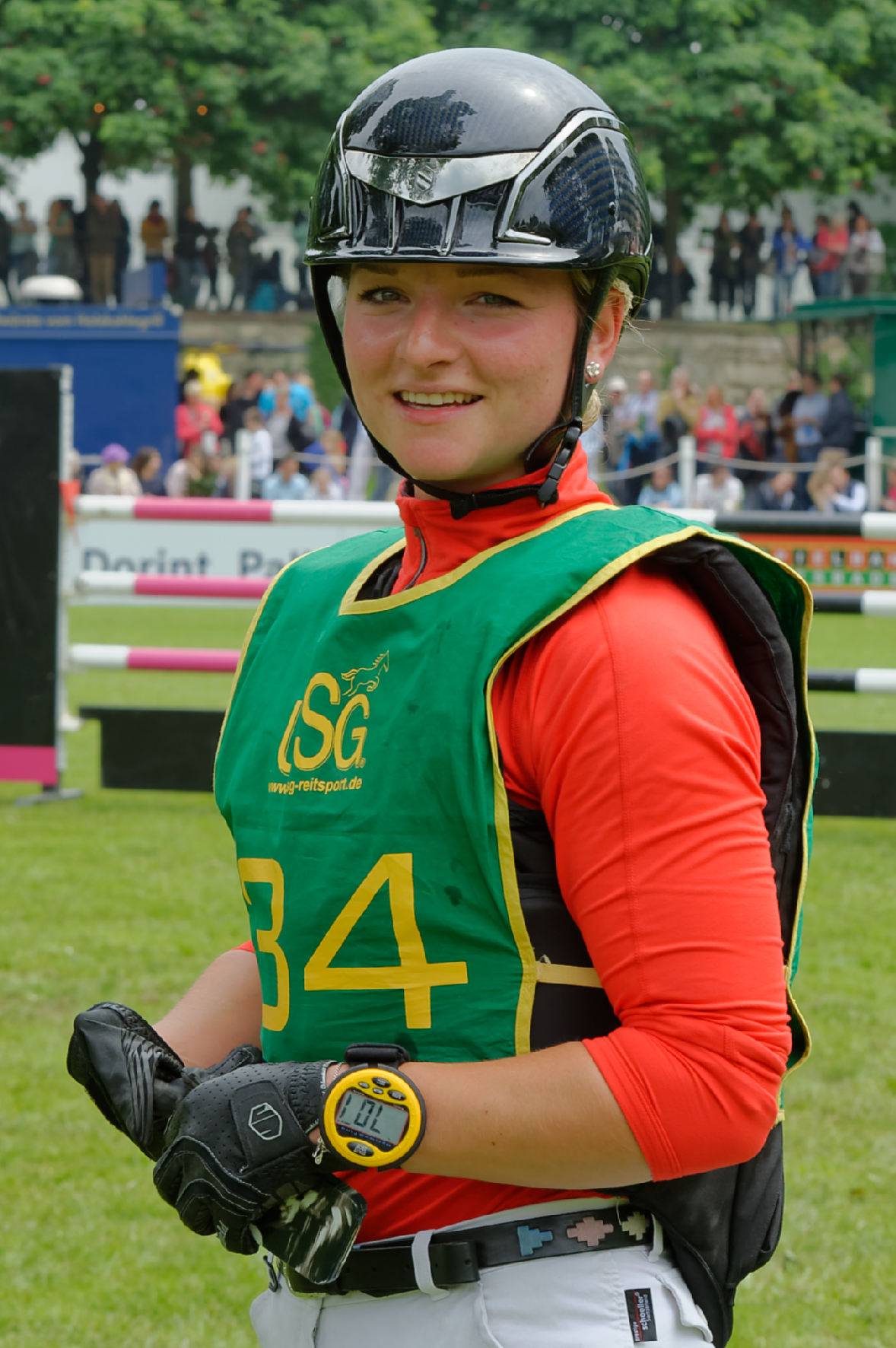
- Krajewski in 2015

Personal information
- Nationality: German
- Born: 22 October 1988 (age 37) Langenhagen, Lower Saxony, West Germany
- Height: 1.68 m (5 ft 6 in)
- Weight: 66 kg (146 lb)

Sport
- Country: Germany
- Sport: Equestrianism
- Event: Eventing
Medal record
Equestrian
Representing Germany
Olympic Games
Gold medal – first place	2020 Tokyo	Individual eventing
Silver medal – second place	2016 Rio de Janeiro	Team eventing
World Championships
Gold medal – first place	2022 Pratoni	Team eventing
Silver medal – second place	2022 Pratoni	Individual eventing
Silver medal – second place	2026 Aachen	Team eventing

Julia Krajewski (born 22 October 1988) is a German equestrian. She represented her country at the 2016 Summer Olympics, where she won the silver medal in the team eventing.

In 2021, at the 2020 Summer Olympics in Tokyo (delayed due to the COVID-19 pandemic), Krajewski won the gold medal in the individual eventing, becoming the first female athlete ever to do so.

== CCI 5* results ==
Results
Event	Kentucky	Badminton	Luhmühlen	Burghley	Pau	Adelaide
2013			WD (London-Return OLD)			
2014-15	Did not participate					
2016			(bronze) (Samourai du Thot)			
2017			(gold) (Samourai du Thot)			
2018	Did not participate					
EL = Eliminated; RET = Retired; WD = Withdrew

== International Championship results ==
Results
Year	Event	Horse	Placing	Notes
2002	European Pony Championships	Cyrano 89	1st place, gold medalist(s)	Team
2002	European Pony Championships	Cyrano 89	2nd place, silver medalist(s)	Individual
2005	European Junior Championships	Leading Edge 2	1st place, gold medalist(s)	Team
2005	European Junior Championships	Leading Edge 2	5th	Individual
2006	European Junior Championships	Leading Edge 2	1st place, gold medalist(s)	Team
2006	European Junior Championships	Leading Edge 2	2nd place, silver medalist(s)	Individual
2008	European Young Rider Championships	Lost Prophecy	2nd place, silver medalist(s)	Team
2008	European Young Rider Championships	Lost Prophecy	2nd place, silver medalist(s)	Individual
2009	European Young Rider Championships	Lost Prophecy	2nd place, silver medalist(s)	Team
2009	European Young Rider Championships	Lost Prophecy	32nd	Individual
2011	European Championships	After The Battle	RET	Individual
2015	World Young Horse Championships	Chipmunk FRH	29th	CCI**
2016	Olympic Games	Samourai du Thot	2nd place, silver medalist(s)	Team
2016	Olympic Games	Samourai du Thot	EL	Individual
2017	European Championships	Samourai du Thot	10th	Team
2017	European Championships	Samourai du Thot	DSQ	Individual
2018	World Equestrian Games	Chipmunk FRH	5th	Team
2018	World Equestrian Games	Chipmunk FRH	39th	Individual
EL = Eliminated; RET = Retired; WD = Withdrew; DSQ = Disqualified

== Notable horses ==
- Cyrano 89 - 1994 Chestnut Oldenburg Gelding (Vikotria's Chirac x Dandy)
  - 2002 European Pony Championships - Team Gold Medal, Individual Silver Medal
- Leading Edge 2 - 1998 Dark Bay Oldenburg Gelding (Lady's King x Ramiro)
  - 2005 European Junior Championships - Team Gold Medal, Individual Fifth Place
  - 2006 European Junior Championships - Team Gold Medal, Individual Silver Medal
- Lost Prophecy - 2000 Black Oldenburg Gelding (Larioni x Lanthan)
  - 2008 European Young Rider Championships - Team Silver Medal, Individual Silver Medal
- After The Battle - 1995 Bay Gelding (General XX x Angriff XX)
  - 2009 European Young Rider Championships - Team Silver Medal
- Samourai du Thot - 2006 Bay Selle Francais Gelding (Milor Landais x Flipper d'Elle)
  - 2016 Rio Olympics - Team Silver Medal
  - 2017 Luhmuhlen CCI**** Winner
- Amande de B’Neville - Mare
  - 2021 Samur, France CCI**** - Winner
  - 2021 German Championships - Bronze Medal
  - 2020 Tokyo Olympics - Individual Gold Medal
