= Shane Rose =

Australian equestrian (born 1973)

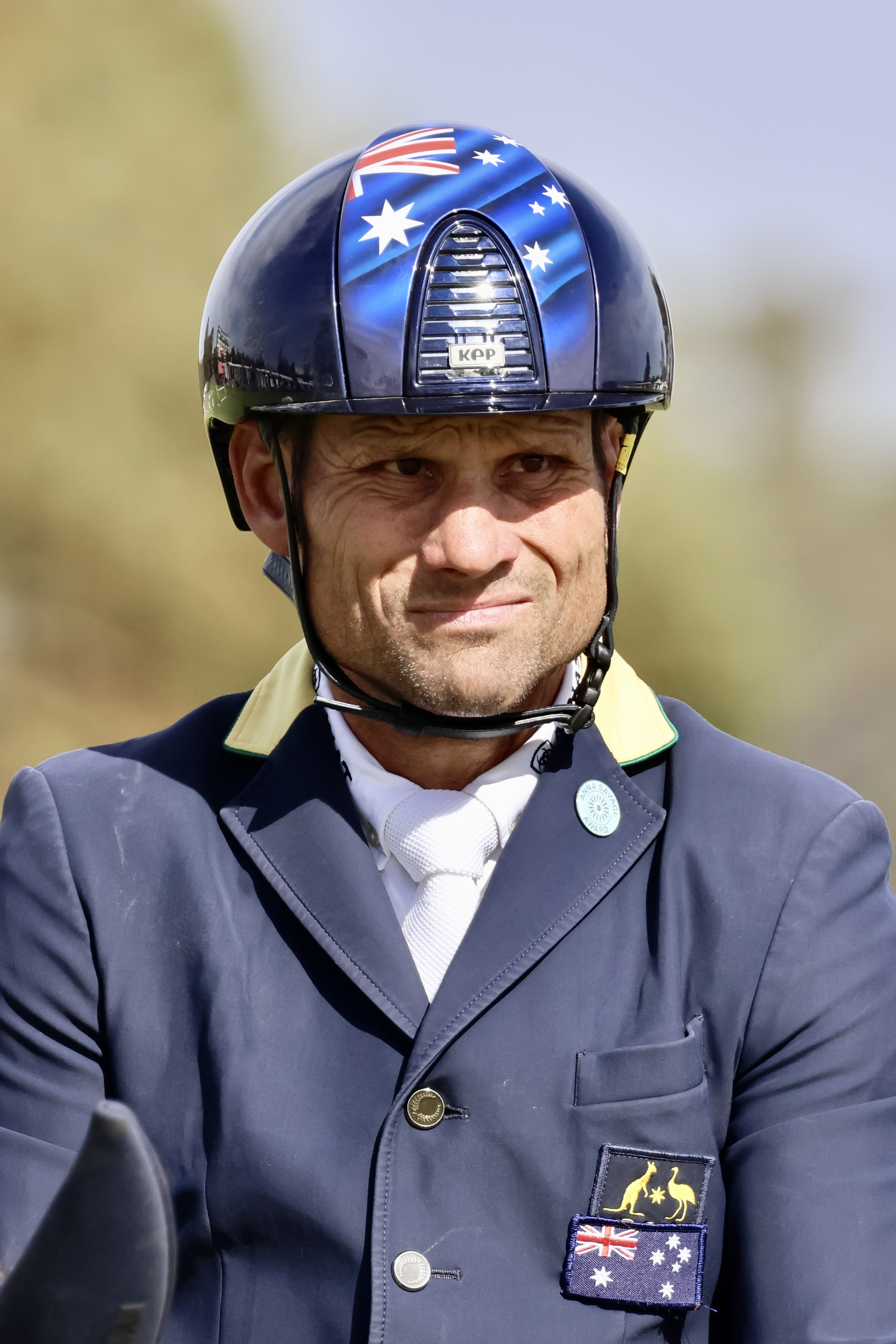
- Rose competing in the 2025 Adelaide Equestrian Festival

Personal information
- Nationality: Australian
- Born: 24 April 1973 (age 53) Sydney, Australia

Sport
- Country: Australia
- Sport: Equestrian
- Event: Eventing
Medal record
Equestrian
Representing Australia
Olympic Games
Silver medal – second place	2008 Beijing	Team eventing
Silver medal – second place	2020 Tokyo	Team eventing
Bronze medal – third place	2016 Rio de Janeiro	Team eventing

Shane Rose (born 24 April 1973 in Sydney) is an Australian equestrian. A three-time Olympic medallist, he started riding at the age of five at the Forest Hills Pony Club. Rose lived with his parents and three siblings in Duffys Forest, New South Wales. He was educated at Newington College Preparatory School, Lindfield (1978–83), and Pittwater House. Rose's love for horses continued to grow, and at 21 years of age he represented Australia in the Young Rider Trans-Tasman competition with Mr Joe Cool.

== Career and personal life ==
As a 23-year-old, he was selected to represent Australia in Eventing at the 1996 Olympic Games in Atlanta. However, his horse went lame upon arrival in the US preventing him from competing. The Australian team went on to win gold. Since then he has competed at many prestigious competitions around the world, including success at the 2008 Beijing Olympics, where Rose and his horse All Luck were part of the team's silver medal for Eventing. He also competed at the 2016 Summer Olympics where he won a team bronze and the Tokyo 2020 Olympics where he won team silver.

He competed in the individual eventing and team eventing at the 2020 Summer Olympics in Tokyo. The team of Andrew Hoy on Vassily de Lassos, Shane Rose on Virgil and Kevin McNab on Don Quidam won silver. Riding on Virgil Rose he finished inside the top 15 in the individual eventing competition.

Rose was diagnosed with thyroid cancer in 2001.

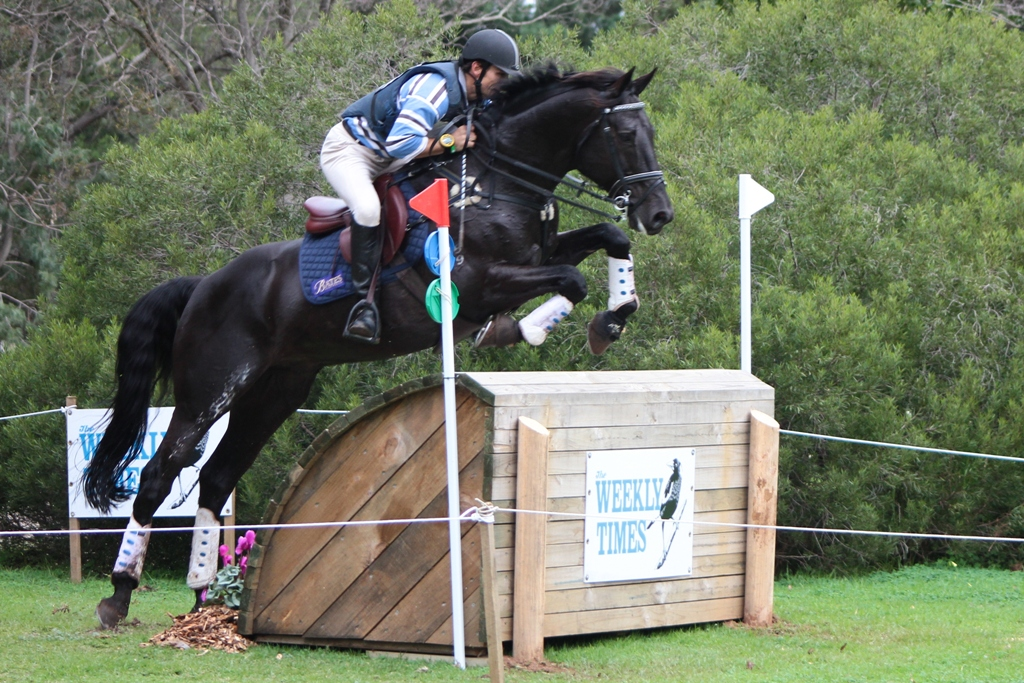
Rose and Statford Novalis competing at the 2010 Melbourne 3 Day

Rose breaks horses and has been injured many times, having had his thumb, both of his wrists, both of his arms, and both of his legs broken. He was once kicked in the head by a horse, was placed in an induced coma for a week, and required facial reconstruction. Another kick in 2015 broke five of his ribs, punctured his lung, split his liver, and left him with a golden staph infection.

After wearing a mankini for a fancy dress competition at a showjumping event in February 2024, Rose was stood down by Equestrian Australia; a subsequent review of the incident cleared Rose, after concluding he had not broken Equestrian Australia's code of conduct. In mid-March 2024, he fractured his pelvis and femur in a fall. Home from hospital in April, he believed he will be fit to compete in Paris.

== Horses ==
- Beauford Miss Dior – 1986 Bay Mare
  - 2004 1st Adelaide CCI**** Winner
- All Luck – 1994 Bay Thoroughbred Gelding
  - 2008 Beijing Olympics – Team Silver Medal, Individual 27th place
- Taurus – 2002 Bay Warmblood Gelding (Aries)
  - 2014 World Equestrian Games – Team Fourth place, Individual 34th place
- CP Qualified – 2003 Gray Holsteiner Gelding (Quite Capitol x Corofino I)
  - 2015 Adelaide CCI***** Winner
  - 2016 Rio Olympics – Team Bronze Medal
- Virgil -
  - 2nd Adelaide CCI***** 2015
  - 16th Burghley CCI*****
  - 7th Luhmuhlen CCI***** 2017
  - 3rd Pau CCI***** 2019
  - 1st Adelaide CCI***** 2023 Winner
