= Therese Viklund =

Swedish equestrian

Personal information
- Born: 2 June 1987 (age 38)

Sport
- Country: Sweden
- Sport: Equestrian
- Event: Eventing

Therese Viklund (born 12 June 1987) is a Swedish equestrian. She represented Sweden at the 2020 Summer Olympics and competed in Individual and Team Eventing on her horse Viscera. Unusually for a horse competing in eventing, Viscera only has sight in one eye. Viklund was eliminated during the cross country phase as result of a fall.
