= Ludvig Svennerstål =

Swedish equestrian

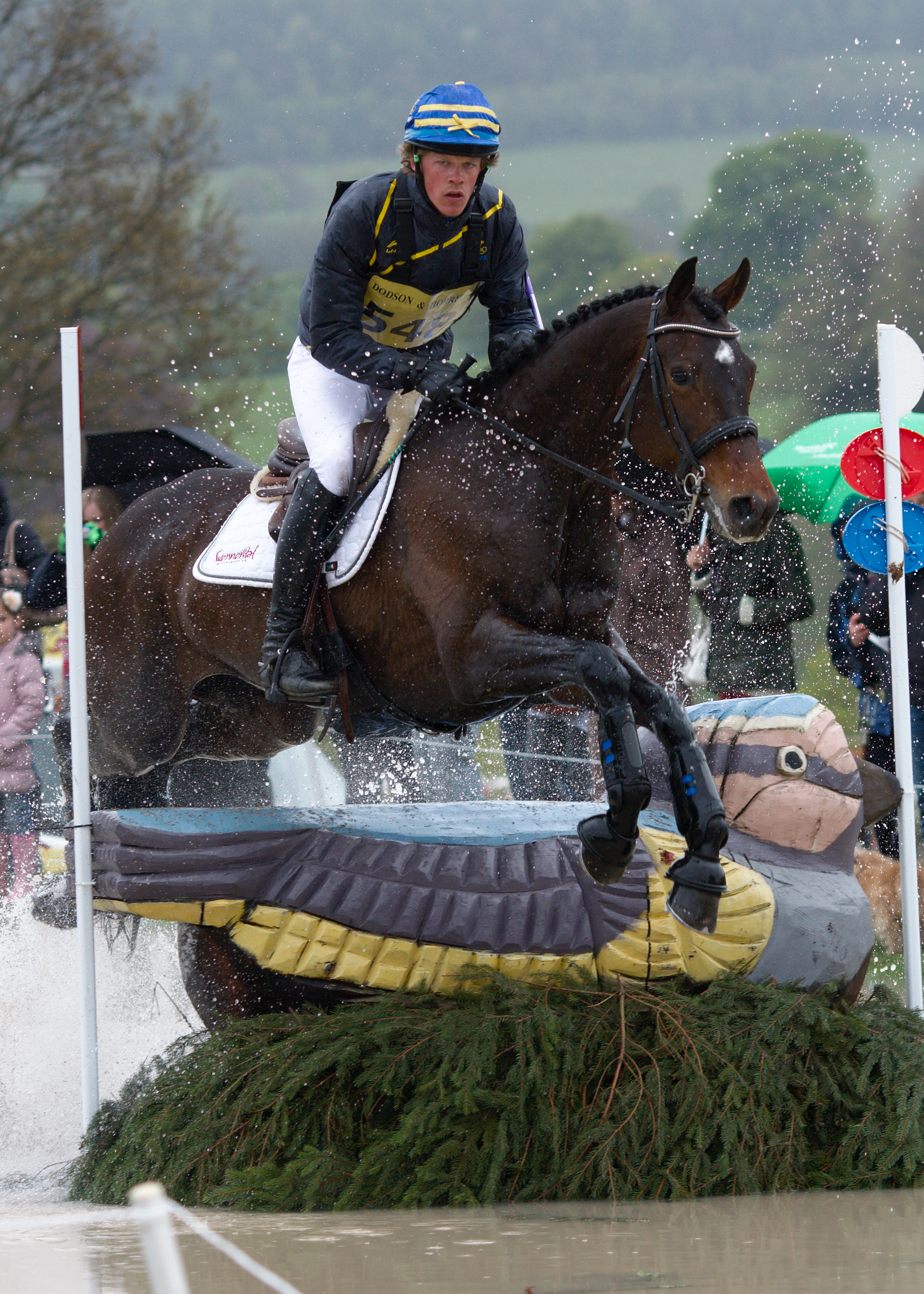
- Ludwig Svennerstal and Tempranillo at the Ice Pond during the cross-country phase of the CIC*** (Section I) competition at Chatsworth International Horse Trials 2013.

Medal record

Equestrian

Representing Sweden

European Championships
Silver medal – second place	2013 Malmo	Team eventing
Silver medal – second place	2017 Strzegom	Team eventing
Bronze medal – third place	2019 Luhmühlen	Team eventing

Sven Ludwig Svennerstål (born 24 August 1990, Stockholm) is a Swedish equestrian. At the 2012 Summer Olympics and 2016 Summer Olympics he competed in the individual eventing, and was part of the Swedish eventing team on both occasions.

Ludwig picked up the Shearwater/ERA Rising Star Award 2013 at the Event Riders Association's annual ball. The award was given to the rider who impressed the most on the International stage in 2013, and the decision was unanimously agreed up on by the jury! At the CCI4* Badminton Horse Trials, Svennerstål with his horse Alexander IV, made a super performance around the cross country, but due to an injury the combination had to withdraw before the Show Jumping phase. At the 2013 European Championships in Malmö, Sweden, Svennerstål saddled up his 2012 Olympic ride Shamwari 4, and the combination had their hands on an individual medal, but after two poles came flying down during the final phase of show jumping they had to "settle" for a team silver for Sweden. At the Land Rover Burghley Horse Trials, King Bob, made an overall super performance which led to a final ninth placing.

== CCI***** Results ==
Results
Event	Kentucky	Badminton	Luhmühlen	Burghley	Pau	Adelaide
2011				EL (King Bob)	37th (King Bob)	
2012	Did not participate					
2013		WD (Alexander)	11th (King Bob)	8th (King Bob)	EL (Shamwari 4)	
2014		8th (Alexander); EL (King Bob)				
2015			14th (King Bob)			
2016	Did not participate					
2017				34th (Balham Mist)		
2018				RET (Stinger)		
2019			8th (El Kazir SP)	8th (Stinger)EL (Balham Mist)	RET (El Kazir SP) EL (Balham Mist) EL (Salunette)	
EL = Eliminated; RET = Retired; WD = Withdrew

== Notable Horses ==
- Thelma – 1996 Chestnut Swedish Warmblood Mare (Turban Rose x Ambassadeur 518)
  - 2007 European Junior Championships – Team Silver Medal, Individual 16th Place
  - 2008 European Junior Championships – Team Seventh Place, Individual 22nd Place
- King Bob – 1999 Dark Bay Gelding
  - 2010 European Young Rider Championships – Individual 19th Place
- Shamwari 4 – 2002 Dark Bay Hanoverian Gelding (Star Regent XX x Der Clou)
  - 2011 European Young Rider Championships – Individual 21st Place
  - 2012 London Olympics – Team Fourth Place, Individual 20th Place
  - 2013 European Championships – Team Silver Medal, Individual Tenth Place
- RLE Aspe – 2008 Bay Holsteiner Mare (Singulord Joter x Levernois)
  - 2016 Rio Olympics – Team 11th Place, Individual 27th Place
- Paramount Importance – 2007 Gray Holsteiner Gelding (Pasco x Louis)
  - 2017 European Championships – Team Silver Medal, Individual 15th Place
- Box Leo – 2010 Dark Brown Swedish Warmblood Gelding (Jaguar Mail x Quite Easy)
  - 2017 FEI Eventing Young Horse World Championships – Fifth Place
