= Andrew Hoy =

Australian equestrian (born 1959)

Andrew Hoy OAM
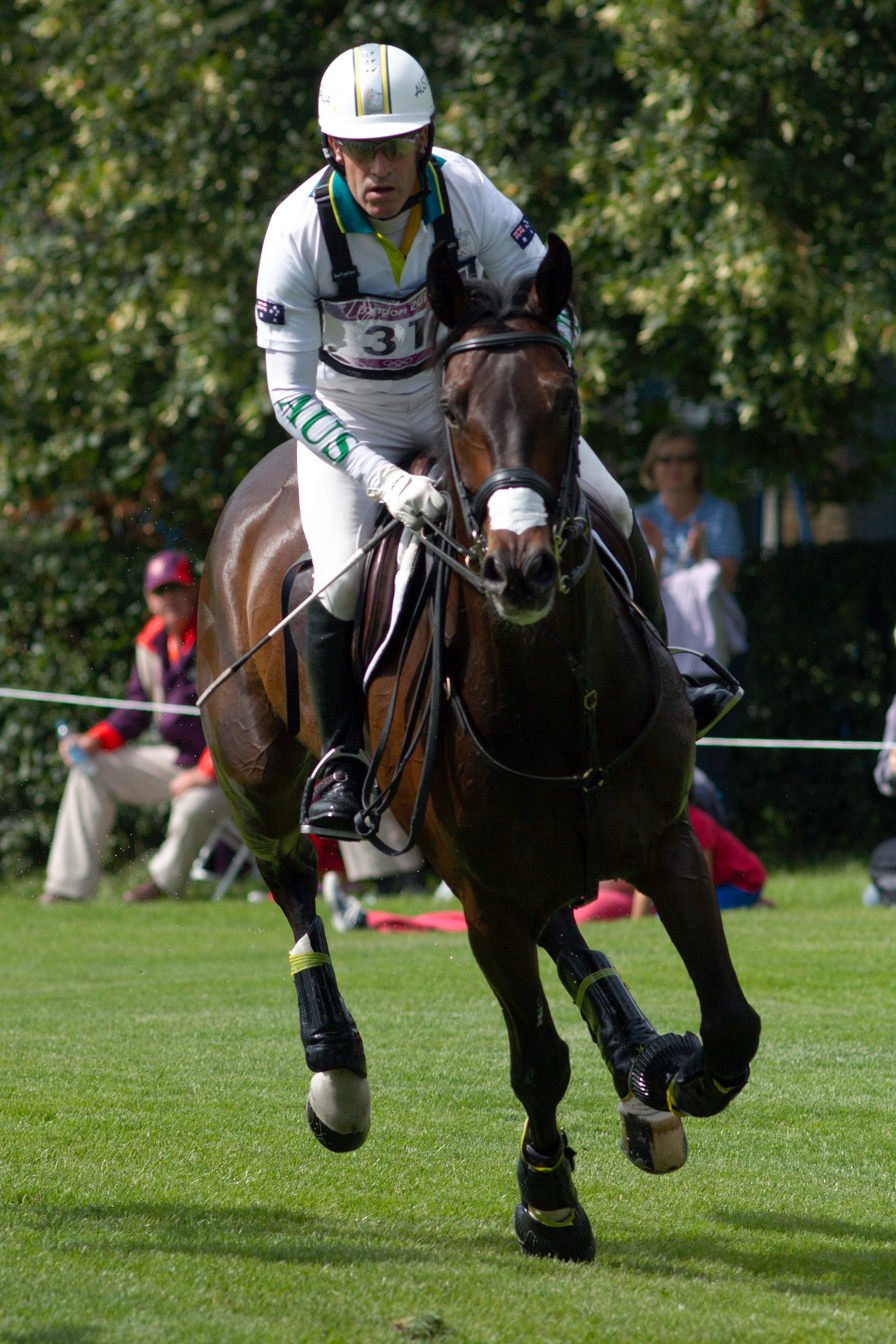
- Hoy and Rutherglen compete at the 2012 Summer Olympics in London

Personal information
- Full name: Andrew James Hoy
- Nationality: Australia
- Discipline: Eventing
- Born: 8 February 1959 (age 67); Culcairn, New South Wales
Medal record
Equestrian
Representing Australia
Olympic Games
Gold medal – first place	1992 Barcelona	Team eventing
Gold medal – first place	1996 Atlanta	Team eventing
Gold medal – first place	2000 Sydney	Team eventing
Silver medal – second place	2000 Sydney	Individual eventing
Silver medal – second place	2020 Tokyo	Team eventing
Bronze medal – third place	2020 Tokyo	Individual eventing
World Championships
Bronze medal – third place	1986 Gawler	Team eventing
Bronze medal – third place	2006 Aachen	Team eventing

Andrew James Hoy OAM (born 8 February 1959) is an Australian equestrian rider. He has won six Olympic medals: three gold, two silvers and one bronze. He has competed in eight Olympic games, from 1984 to 2020 with the exception of 2008, which is an Australian record; and at the 2020 Summer Olympics he was 62 years old, making him Australia's oldest ever male Olympian. After winning two medals in Tokyo, he did not rule out trying for future Olympic teams.

Hoy is based in Leicestershire, in the United Kingdom with his team. He has been living in the UK since 1993.

Hoy was inducted into the Sport Australia Hall of Fame in 2000.

== Early life ==
Andrew Hoy was born in Culcairn, NSW, and spent his earlier years there. He started riding when only six-years-old. The rest of his life has been spent around horses. In 1978, he moved to England to train and now lives there.

Hoy participated in his first International Championships at the age of 19 where he represented Australia at the 1978 World Championships in Kentucky. A year later, he won his first CCI4* competition.

== Personal life ==
Hoy and his ex-wife Bettina Hoy, who competed at the Olympic level for Germany, lived for 12 years in Gloucestershire, at the Gatcombe Park estate of The Princess Royal. The Hoys were the only married couple that has ever competed against each other in different teams for the same Olympic medals. In January 2009, the couple moved to the DOKR (Deutsches Olympia Kommitee für Reiterei) in Warendorf, Germany. In June 2010, Hoy moved to Farley Estate in the UK, and then to Wiltshire. In November 2011, Bettina publicly announced their separation. She handed her ride, Lanfranco TSF to her former husband, Andrew Hoy, under the terms of their divorce agreement. In 2013, Hoy and partner Stefanie Strobl moved to Somerby, Leicestershire. Hoy and Strobl have a daughter and son.

== Olympic results ==
At the 2020 Summer Olympics he rode David and Paula Evans' 12-year-old Anglo-Arab Vassily de Lassos.

== CCI5* results ==
Results
Event	Kentucky	Badminton	Luhmühlen	Burghley	Pau	Adelaide
2002		8th (Darien Powers)		4th (Mr. Pracatan)		
2003		7th (Mr. Pracatan); 26th (Moonfleet)		9th (Master Monarch)		
2004		5th (Mr. Pracatan)		(gold) (Moonfleet); 4th (Master Monarch)		
2005	8th (Exquis Yeoman's Point); EL (Moonfleet)	(bronze) (Master Monarch); 6th (Mr. Pracatan)	11th (Moonfleet)	6th (Mr. Pracatan); WD (Master Monarch)		
2006	(gold) (Master Monarch); 9th (Exquis Yeoman's Point)	(gold) (Moonfleet); 15th (Mr. Pracatan)	12th (Classy Touch)	(silver) (Moonfleet); 5th (Mr. Pracatan)		
2007			14th (Classy Touch)	(bronze) (Master Monarch)	WD (Exquis Yeoman's Point)	
2008		EL (Moonfleet)	4th (Moonfleet)	RET (Moonfleet)	6th (Moonfleet)	
2009			EL (Grand Joca)			
2010-2011	did not participate					
2012	17th (Rutherglen)		6th (Rutherglen)			
2013			WD (Rutherglen)			
2014			11th (Rutherglen)	RET (Rutherglen)		
2015		EL (Rutherglen); EL (Lanfranco)	RET (Algebra)	EL (Rutherglen)		
2016			11th (Rutherglen)	20th (Rutherglen); EL (The Blue Frontier)		
2017		41st (Rutherglen); EL (The Blue Frontier)		37th (The Blue Frontier)		
EL = Eliminated; RET = Retired; WD = Withdrew
