= Equestrian events at the Asian Games =

Equestrian at the Asian Games
- Dates: Tent Pegging: 1982; Jumping and Eventing: 1982-present Dressage: 1986-present Endurance: 2006
- Competitors: OCA member competitors from OCA member nations

Equestrian sports have been an Asian Games event since 1982 in New Delhi, India.

== Editions ==
Games	Year	Host city	Best nation
IX	1982	New Delhi, India	India
X	1986	Seoul, South Korea	Japan
XII	1994	Hiroshima, Japan	Japan
XIII	1998	Bangkok, Thailand	Japan
XIV	2002	Busan, South Korea	South Korea
XV	2006	Doha, Qatar	Qatar; South Korea
XVI	2010	Guangzhou, China	South Korea
XVII	2014	Incheon, South Korea	South Korea
XVIII	2018	Jakarta–Palembang, Indonesia	Japan
XIX	2022	Hangzhou, China	China
XX	2026	Tokyo, Japan	China; Saudi Arabia

== Events ==
Event	82	86	94	98	02	06	10	14	18	22	Years
Individual dressage		X	X	X	X	X	X	X	X	X	9
Team dressage		X	X	X	X	X	X	X	X	X	9
Individual endurance						X					1
Team endurance						X					1
Individual eventing	X	X		X	X	X	X	X	X	X	9
Team eventing	X	X		X	X	X	X	X	X	X	9
Individual jumping	X	X	X	X	X	X	X	X	X	X	10
Team jumping		X	X	X	X	X	X	X	X	X	9
Individual tent pegging	X										1
Total	4	6	4	6	6	8	6	6	6	6	58

== Medal table ==
Updated after the 2026 Asian Games

Rank	Nation	Gold	Silver	Bronze	Total
1	Japan (JPN)	18	17	14	49
2	South Korea (KOR)	16	14	7	37
3	Saudi Arabia (KSA)	9	2	3	14
4	China (CHN)	4	4	4	12
5	India (IND)	4	3	7	14
6	Qatar (QAT)	4	3	3	10
7	Thailand (THA)	3	4	6	13
8	United Arab Emirates (UAE)	2	5	4	11
9	Kuwait (KUW)	2	2	2	6
10	Malaysia (MAS)	1	4	6	11
11	Hong Kong (HKG)	1	1	3	5
12	Philippines (PHI)	1	1	1	3
13	Chinese Taipei (TPE)	0	2	2	4
14	Bahrain (BRN)	0	2	0	2
15	Pakistan (PAK)	0	1	0	1
16	Indonesia (INA)	0	0	1	1
16	Iran (IRI)	0	0	1	1
16	Iraq (IRQ)	0	0	1	1
Totals (18 entries)		65	65	65	195
