= Equestrian at the 2014 Asian Games – Individual dressage =

Individual dressage at the 2014 Asian Games
- Venue: Incheon Dream Park
- Date: 20–23 September 2014
- Competitors: 32 from 10 nations

Medalists
| gold medal | Hwang Young-shik | South Korea |
| silver medal | Kim Dong-seon | South Korea |
| bronze medal | Larasati Gading | Indonesia |

Individual dressage equestrian at the 2014 Asian Games was held in Dream Park Equestrian Venue, Incheon, South Korea from September 20 to 23, 2014.

== Schedule ==
All times are Korea Standard Time (UTC+09:00)

| Date | Time | Event |
|---|---|---|
| Saturday, 20 September 2014 | 12:00 | Prix St-Georges |
| Sunday, 21 September 2014 | 13:00 | Intermediate I |
| Tuesday, 23 September 2014 | 13:00 | Intermediate I freestyle |

== Results ==
=== Prix St-Georges ===
| Rank | Athlete | Horse | % score |
|---|---|---|---|
| 1 | Hwang Young-shik (KOR) | Fursteuberg | 74.342 |
| 2 | Shingo Hayashi (JPN) | Veranus | 71.395 |
| 3 | Kim Dong-seon (KOR) | Finally | 71.237 |
| 4 | Larasati Gading (INA) | Wallenstein 145 | 70.684 |
| 5 | Chung Yoo-yeon (KOR) | Royal Red 2 | 69.658 |
| 6 | Kazuki Sado (JPN) | Winnetou DDH | 69.184 |
| 7 | Tomoko Nakamura (JPN) | Pacific B | 68.947 |
| 8 | Mayumi Okunishi (JPN) | Freestyle 35 | 68.895 |
| 9 | Kim Kyun-sub (KOR) | Dark Secret | 68.816 |
| 10 | Jacqueline Siu (HKG) | Ferrera | 67.579 |
| 11 | Chang Yu-chieh (TPE) | Nora | 67.553 |
| 12 | Nadia Haridass (IND) | Toranto | 67.395 |
| 12 | Kuo Li-yu (TPE) | Temptation | 67.395 |
| 14 | Alfaro Menayang (INA) | Diamond Boy 8 | 67.342 |
| 15 | Liu Tao (CHN) | Razida | 67.316 |
| 16 | Yeh Hsiu-hua (TPE) | Urban Legend | 67.211 |
| 17 | Lan Chao (CHN) | Weltroon | 67.053 |
| 18 | Liu Lina (CHN) | Don Dinero | 66.526 |
| 19 | Huang Zhuoqin (CHN) | Uris | 66.184 |
| 19 | Shruti Vora (IND) | Akira | 66.184 |
| 21 | Janette Bouman (KAZ) | V-Power | 65.263 |
| 22 | Chalermcharn Yotviriyapanit (THA) | Chance | 65.079 |
| 23 | Pakinee Pantapa (THA) | Tayutin | 64.895 |
| 24 | Caroline Chew (SIN) | Romaniero | 64.737 |
| 25 | Ferry Wahyu Hadiyanto (INA) | Douceur 3 | 63.921 |
| 26 | Ravisara Wachakorn (THA) | Sir Carlos | 62.895 |
| 27 | Shubhsri Rajendra (IND) | Smoky 249 | 61.895 |
| 28 | Sergey Buikevich (KAZ) | Ispovednik | 61.816 |
| 29 | Natalya Yurkevich (KAZ) | Donpetro H.L. | 61.053 |
| 30 | Vanita Malhotra (IND) | Cantaro | 58.947 |
| 31 | Sirivannavari Nariratana (THA) | Prince Charming WPA | 58.079 |
| 32 | Wang Ko-wen (TPE) | Daquino 2 | 56.763 |

=== Intermediate I ===
| Rank | Athlete | Horse | % score |
|---|---|---|---|
| 1 | Hwang Young-shik (KOR) | Fursteuberg | 76.711 |
| 2 | Kim Dong-seon (KOR) | Finally | 73.474 |
| 3 | Larasati Gading (INA) | Wallenstein 145 | 71.632 |
| 4 | Jacqueline Siu (HKG) | Ferrera | 71.079 |
| 5 | Tomoko Nakamura (JPN) | Pacific B | 70.789 |
| 6 | Kazuki Sado (JPN) | Winnetou DDH | 70.711 |
| 7 | Shingo Hayashi (JPN) | Veranus | 70.105 |
| 8 | Chung Yoo-yeon (KOR) | Royal Red 2 | 69.579 |
| 9 | Alfaro Menayang (INA) | Diamond Boy 8 | 68.763 |
| 10 | Yeh Hsiu-hua (TPE) | Urban Legend | 68.684 |
| 11 | Chang Yu-chieh (TPE) | Nora | 68.658 |
| 12 | Kim Kyun-sub (KOR) | Dark Secret | 68.605 |
| 13 | Shruti Vora (IND) | Akira | 68.474 |
| 14 | Liu Tao (CHN) | Razida | 68.447 |
| 15 | Kuo Li-yu (TPE) | Temptation | 68.316 |
| 16 | Huang Zhuoqin (CHN) | Uris | 67.263 |
| 17 | Janette Bouman (KAZ) | V-Power | 66.184 |
| 17 | Liu Lina (CHN) | Don Dinero | 66.184 |
| 19 | Nadia Haridass (IND) | Toranto | 66.105 |
| 20 | Caroline Chew (SIN) | Romaniero | 66.000 |
| 21 | Mayumi Okunishi (JPN) | Freestyle 35 | 65.579 |
| 22 | Lan Chao (CHN) | Weltroon | 65.316 |
| 23 | Pakinee Pantapa (THA) | Tayutin | 65.158 |
| 24 | Ferry Wahyu Hadiyanto (INA) | Douceur 3 | 65.079 |
| 25 | Sergey Buikevich (KAZ) | Ispovednik | 64.526 |
| 26 | Ravisara Wachakorn (THA) | Sir Carlos | 63.474 |
| 27 | Natalya Yurkevich (KAZ) | Donpetro H.L. | 62.763 |
| 28 | Chalermcharn Yotviriyapanit (THA) | Chance | 60.895 |
| 29 | Shubhsri Rajendra (IND) | Smoky 249 | 59.421 |
| 30 | Vanita Malhotra (IND) | Cantaro | 56.211 |

=== Intermediate I freestyle ===
| Rank | Athlete | Horse | II % score | IIF % score | Total |
|---|---|---|---|---|---|
| 1st place, gold medalist(s) | Hwang Young-shik (KOR) | Fursteuberg | 76.711 | 76.575 | 153.286 |
| 2nd place, silver medalist(s) | Kim Dong-seon (KOR) | Finally | 73.474 | 77.225 | 150.699 |
| 3rd place, bronze medalist(s) | Larasati Gading (INA) | Wallenstein 145 | 71.632 | 74.075 | 145.707 |
| 4 | Jacqueline Siu (HKG) | Ferrera | 71.079 | 72.875 | 143.954 |
| 5 | Kazuki Sado (JPN) | Winnetou DDH | 70.711 | 71.800 | 142.511 |
| 6 | Yeh Hsiu-hua (TPE) | Urban Legend | 68.684 | 71.975 | 140.659 |
| 7 | Huang Zhuoqin (CHN) | Uris | 67.263 | 72.100 | 139.363 |
| 8 | Tomoko Nakamura (JPN) | Pacific B | 70.789 | 68.000 | 138.789 |
| 9 | Shruti Vora (IND) | Akira | 68.474 | 69.375 | 137.849 |
| 10 | Alfaro Menayang (INA) | Diamond Boy 8 | 68.763 | 68.600 | 137.363 |
| 11 | Liu Tao (CHN) | Razida | 68.447 | 67.175 | 135.622 |
| 12 | Janette Bouman (KAZ) | V-Power | 66.184 | 68.600 | 134.784 |
| 13 | Chang Yu-chieh (TPE) | Nora | 68.658 | 64.600 | 133.258 |
| 14 | Caroline Chew (SIN) | Romaniero | 66.000 | 66.950 | 132.950 |
| 15 | Nadia Haridass (IND) | Toranto | 66.105 | 60.350 | 126.455 |
