= Equestrian events at the 2002 Asian Games =

Asian Games competition

- Venue: Busan Equestrian Grounds
- Dates: 2–14 October 2002
- Competitors: 80 from 10 nations

Equestrian events were contested at the 2002 Asian Games in Busan Equestrian Grounds, Busan, South Korea, from 2 to 14 October. There were three equestrian disciplines: dressage, eventing and jumping. All three disciplines are further divided into individual and team contests for a total of six events.

== Schedule ==
●	Round	●	Last round	Q	Qualification	F	Final

Event↓/Date →	2nd Wed	3rd Thu	4th Fri	5th Sat	6th Sun	7th Mon	8th Tue	9th Wed	10th Thu	11th Fri	12th Sat	13th Sun	14th Mon
Individual dressage							Q		F				
Team dressage							F						
Individual eventing	●	●	●										
Team eventing	●	●	●										
Individual jumping										Q	Q		F
Team jumping										●	●		

== Medalists ==
Event	Gold	Silver	Bronze
Individual dressage	Choi Jun-sang; South Korea	Suh Jung-kyun; South Korea	Naoki Hitomi; Japan
Team dressage	South Korea; Choi Jun-sang; Suh Jung-kyun; Shin Chang-moo; Kim Jung-keun	Japan; Hiroyuki Kitahara; Naoki Hitomi; Masumi Yokokawa; Yuriko Miyoshi	China; Huang Zhuoqin; Zhang Lijun; Gu Bing
Individual eventing	Pongsiree Bunluewong; Thailand	Cheon Sang-yong; South Korea	Daisuke Kato; Japan
Team eventing	Japan; Daisuke Kato; Sachiko Kodera; Masaru Fuse; Shigeyuki Hosono	South Korea; Cheon Sang-yong; Kim Kyun-sub; Kim Hyung-chil; Kim Hong-chul	India; Indrajit Lamba; Bhagirath Singh; Rajesh Pattu; Deep Kumar Ahlawat
Individual jumping	Mikee Cojuangco-Jaworski; Philippines	Lee Jin-kyung; South Korea	Tadayoshi Hayashi; Japan
Team jumping	Japan; Tadayoshi Hayashi; Osamu Komiyama; Kenji Morimoto; Eiji Okazaki	Philippines; Danielle Cojuangco; Mikee Cojuangco-Jaworski; Toni Leviste; Michelle Barrera	Malaysia; Qabil Ambak; Quzier Ambak; Syed Omar Al-Mohdzar; Syed Zain Al-Mohdzar

== Medal table ==
Rank	Nation	Gold	Silver	Bronze	Total
1	South Korea (KOR)	2	4	0	6
2	Japan (JPN)	2	1	3	6
3	Philippines (PHI)	1	1	0	2
4	Thailand (THA)	1	0	0	1
5	China (CHN)	0	0	1	1
5	India (IND)	0	0	1	1
5	Malaysia (MAS)	0	0	1	1
Totals (7 entries)		6	6	6	18

== Participating nations ==
A total of 80 athletes from 10 nations competed in equestrian events at the 2002 Asian Games:

- China (7)
- Chinese Taipei (4)
- Hong Kong (6)
- India (12)
- Iran (4)
- Japan (12)
- Malaysia (6)
- Philippines (4)
- South Korea (13)
- Thailand (12)
