= Equestrian at the 2014 Asian Games – Team dressage =

Team dressage at the 2014 Asian Games
- Venue: Incheon Dream Park
- Date: 20 September 2014
- Competitors: 30 from 8 nations

Medalists
| gold medal | South Korea; Kim Kyun-sub, Chung Yoo-yeon, Kim Dong-seon, Hwang Young-shik |
| silver medal | Japan; Mayumi Okunishi, Kazuki Sado, Tomoko Nakamura, Shingo Hayashi |
| bronze medal | Chinese Taipei; Wang Ko-wen, Chang Yu-chieh, Kuo Li-yu, Yeh Hsiu-hua |

Team dressage equestrian at the 2014 Asian Games was held in Dream Park Equestrian Venue, Incheon, South Korea on September 20, 2014.

== Schedule ==
All times are Korea Standard Time (UTC+09:00)

| Date | Time | Event |
|---|---|---|
| Saturday, 20 September 2014 | 12:00 | Prix St-Georges |

== Results ==
| Rank | Team | % score |
|---|---|---|
| 1st place, gold medalist(s) | South Korea (KOR) | 71.746 |
| | Kim Kyun-sub on Dark Secret | ~~68.816~~ |
| | Chung Yoo-yeon on Royal Red 2 | 69.658 |
| | Kim Dong-seon on Finally | 71.237 |
| | Hwang Young-shik on Fursteuberg | 74.342 |
| 2nd place, silver medalist(s) | Japan (JPN) | 69.842 |
| | Mayumi Okunishi on Freestyle 35 | ~~68.895~~ |
| | Kazuki Sado on Winnetou DDH | 69.184 |
| | Tomoko Nakamura on Pacific B | 68.947 |
| | Shingo Hayashi on Veranus | 71.395 |
| 3rd place, bronze medalist(s) | Chinese Taipei (TPE) | 67.386 |
| | Wang Ko-wen on Daquino 2 | ~~56.763~~ |
| | Chang Yu-chieh on Nora | 67.553 |
| | Kuo Li-yu on Temptation | 67.395 |
| | Yeh Hsiu-hua on Urban Legend | 67.211 |
| 4 | Indonesia (INA) | 67.316 |
| | Ferry Wahyu Hadiyanto on Douceur 3 | 63.921 |
| | Alfaro Menayang on Diamond Boy 8 | 67.342 |
| | Larasati Gading on Wallenstein 145 | 70.684 |
| 5 | China (CHN) | 66.965 |
| | Lan Chao on Weltroon | 67.053 |
| | Huang Zhuoqin on Uris | ~~66.184~~ |
| | Liu Lina on Don Dinero | 66.526 |
| | Liu Tao on Razida | 67.316 |
| 6 | India (IND) | 65.158 |
| | Shubhsri Rajendra on Smoky 249 | 61.895 |
| | Nadia Haridass on Toranto | 67.395 |
| | Vanita Malhotra on Cantaro | ~~58.947~~ |
| | Shruti Vora on Akira | 66.184 |
| 7 | Thailand (THA) | 64.289 |
| | Sirivannavari Nariratana on Prince Charming WPA | ~~58.079~~ |
| | Pakinee Pantapa on Tayutin | 64.895 |
| | Ravisara Wachakorn on Sir Carlos | 62.895 |
| | Chalermcharn Yotviriyapanit on Chance | 65.079 |
| 8 | Kazakhstan (KAZ) | 62.711 |
| | Janette Bouman on V-Power | 65.263 |
| | Sergey Buikevich on Ispovednik | 61.816 |
| | Natalya Yurkevich on Donpetro H.L. | 61.053 |
