= Equestrian at the 2010 Asian Games – Individual dressage =

Individual dressage at the 2010 Asian Games
- Venue: Guangzhou Equestrian Venue
- Date: 14–17 November 2010
- Competitors: 23 from 7 nations

Medalists
gold medal	Hwang Young-shik	South Korea
silver medal	Quzandria Nur	Malaysia
bronze medal	Qabil Ambak	Malaysia

Individual dressage equestrian at the 2010 Asian Games was held in Guangzhou Equestrian Venue, Guangzhou, China from November 14 to 17, 2010.

== Schedule ==
All times are China Standard Time (UTC+08:00)

Date	Time	Event
Sunday, 14 November 2010	12:00	Prix St-Georges
Monday, 15 November 2010	13:00	Intermediate I
Wednesday, 17 November 2010	13:00	Intermediate I freestyle

== Results ==
Legend

- RT — Retired

=== Prix St-Georges ===
Rank	Athlete	Horse	% score
1	Hwang Young-shik (KOR)	Laura	68.333
2	Choi Jun-sang (KOR)	Ricco	66.778
3	Gu Bing (CHN)	Donovan-Bailey	66.556
4	Shingo Hayashi (JPN)	Olga	66.500
5	Qabil Ambak (MAS)	Wup	66.111
6	Huang Zhuoqin (CHN)	Uris	65.833
7	Quzandria Nur (MAS)	Handsome	65.722
8	Asuka Sakurai (JPN)	Wesley S	64.444
9	Cai Qiao (CHN)	Kosmopolit An	64.389
10	Liu Lina (CHN)	Cortez35	63.944
11	Yeh Hsiu-hua (TPE)	Caramias Donna	63.889
12	Diani Lee (MAS)	Stravinsky	63.500
13	Mayumi Ino (JPN)	Niels	63.333
14	Akihiro Shimoda (JPN)	Loriot 347	62.833
15	Putri Alia Soraya (MAS)	Odurin	62.722
16	Kim Dong-seon (KOR)	Pleasure 18	62.167
17	Kim Kyun-sub (KOR)	Hellani	61.778
18	Farah Al-Khojai (UAE)	Dubai Dutyfree Wisper	61.000
19	Aram Gregory (HKG)	Exhilaro	60.667
20	Chang Fang-yu (TPE)	Touche	59.778
21	Chen Yi-tsung (TPE)	Furstendonner AF	58.500
22	Jacqueline Siu (HKG)	Rocco	57.056
—	Lee Yuan (TPE)	Helan Yihao	RT

=== Intermediate I ===
Rank	Athlete	Horse	% score
1	Hwang Young-shik (KOR)	Laura	71.368
2	Qabil Ambak (MAS)	Wup	69.789
3	Quzandria Nur (MAS)	Handsome	69.316
4	Shingo Hayashi (JPN)	Olga	67.316
5	Choi Jun-sang (KOR)	Ricco	67.105
5	Gu Bing (CHN)	Donovan-Bailey	67.105
7	Huang Zhuoqin (CHN)	Uris	65.000
8	Yeh Hsiu-hua (TPE)	Caramias Donna	64.053
9	Cai Qiao (CHN)	Kosmopolit An	63.947
10	Chang Fang-yu (TPE)	Touche	62.842
11	Aram Gregory (HKG)	Exhilaro	62.316
12	Mayumi Ino (JPN)	Niels	61.789
12	Kim Dong-seon (KOR)	Pleasure 18	61.789
14	Diani Lee (MAS)	Stravinsky	61.737
15	Farah Al-Khojai (UAE)	Dubai Dutyfree Wisper	60.526
15	Jacqueline Siu (HKG)	Rocco	60.526
17	Asuka Sakurai (JPN)	Wesley S	58.421
18	Chen Yi-tsung (TPE)	Furstendonner AF	57.105

=== Intermediate I freestyle ===
Rank	Athlete	Horse	II % score	IIF % score	Total
1st place, gold medalist(s)	Hwang Young-shik (KOR)	Laura	71.368	74.900	73.134
2nd place, silver medalist(s)	Quzandria Nur (MAS)	Handsome	69.316	73.800	71.558
3rd place, bronze medalist(s)	Qabil Ambak (MAS)	Wup	69.789	72.600	71.195
4	Choi Jun-sang (KOR)	Ricco	67.105	69.350	68.228
5	Shingo Hayashi (JPN)	Olga	67.316	68.400	67.858
6	Huang Zhuoqin (CHN)	Uris	65.000	66.650	65.825
7	Gu Bing (CHN)	Donovan-Bailey	67.105	60.200	63.653
8	Mayumi Ino (JPN)	Niels	61.789	64.950	63.370
9	Yeh Hsiu-hua (TPE)	Caramias Donnav	64.053	62.450	63.252
10	Chang Fang-yu (TPE)	Touche	62.842	61.200	62.021
11	Aram Gregory (HKG)	Exhilaro	62.316	61.200	61.758
12	Jacqueline Siu (HKG)	Rocco	60.526	62.550	61.538
13	Farah Al-Khojai (UAE)	Dubai Dutyfree Wisper	60.526	59.900	60.213
