= Equestrian events at the 2006 Asian Games =

Asian Games

- Venue: Doha Racing & Equestrian Club; Mesaieed Endurance Course
- Dates: 4–14 December 2006
- Competitors: 163 from 22 nations

Equestrian sports and Equestrian Endurance were contested at the 2006 Asian Games in Doha, Qatar, from 4 to 14 December.

In this sport, men and women compete side by side, against one another. There were three equestrian disciplines: dressage, eventing and jumping. Endurance events was contested on 14 December on Mesaieed Endurance Course.

== Schedule ==
●	Round	●	Last round	Q	Qualification	F	Final

Event↓/Date →	4th Mon	5th Tue		6th Wed	7th Thu	8th Fri	9th Sat	10th Sun	11th Mon	12th Tue	13th Wed	14th Thu
Individual dressage	Q	Q	F									
Team dressage	F											
Individual endurance												F
Team endurance												F
Individual eventing				●	●	●						
Team eventing				●	●	●						
Individual jumping								Q	Q	F		
Team jumping								●	●			

== Medalists ==
Event	Gold	Silver	Bronze
Individual dressage	Choi Jun-sang; South Korea	Yukiko Noge; Japan	Qabil Ambak; Malaysia
Team dressage	South Korea; Choi Jun-sang; Kim Dong-seon; Shin Soo-jin; Suh Jung-kyun	Malaysia; Diani Lee; Putri Alia Soraya; Quzandria Nur; Qabil Ambak	Japan; Kumiko Sakamoto; Masanao Takahashi; Asuka Sakurai; Yukiko Noge
Individual endurance	Rashid Al-Maktoum; United Arab Emirates	Nasser Al-Khalifa; Bahrain	Sultan Bin Sulayem; United Arab Emirates
Team endurance	United Arab Emirates; Rashid Al-Maktoum; Hamdan Al-Maktoum; Ahmed Al-Maktoum; Majid Al-Maktoum	Bahrain; Ahmed Hamad Al-Rowaiei; Duaij Al-Khalifa; Khalid Al-Khalifa; Nasser Al-Khalifa	Qatar; Fahad Al-Hajri; Mohammed Al-Thani; Essa Al-Mannai; Ali Al-Malki
Individual eventing	Yoshiaki Oiwa; Japan	Abdulla Al-Ejail; Qatar	Husref Malek; Malaysia
Team eventing	Qatar; Awad Al-Qahtani; Rashid Al-Marri; Ali Al-Marri; Abdulla Al-Ejail	Japan; Ikko Murakami; Shigeyuki Hosono; Yoshiaki Oiwa; Daisuke Kato	India; Bhagirath Singh; Deep Kumar Ahlawat; Palwinder Singh; Rajesh Pattu
Individual jumping	Ali Al-Rumaihi; Qatar	Jasmine Chen; Chinese Taipei	Joo Jung-hyun; South Korea
Team jumping	Saudi Arabia; Khaled Al-Eid; Abdullah Al-Saud; Kamal Bahamdan; Abdullah Al-Sharbatly	South Korea; Song Sang-wuk; Hwang Soon-won; Park Jae-hong; Joo Jung-hyun	United Arab Emirates; Latifa Al-Maktoum; Abdullah Al-Marri; Abdullah Al-Muhairi; Mohamed Al-Kumaiti

== Medal table ==
Rank	Nation	Gold	Silver	Bronze	Total
1	Qatar (QAT)	2	1	1	4
1	South Korea (KOR)	2	1	1	4
3	United Arab Emirates (UAE)	2	0	2	4
4	Japan (JPN)	1	2	1	4
5	Saudi Arabia (KSA)	1	0	0	1
6	Bahrain (BRN)	0	2	0	2
7	Malaysia (MAS)	0	1	2	3
8	Chinese Taipei (TPE)	0	1	0	1
9	India (IND)	0	0	1	1
Totals (9 entries)		8	8	8	24

== Participating nations ==
A total of 163 athletes from 22 nations competed in equestrian events at the 2006 Asian Games:

- Bahrain (10)
- China (2)
- Chinese Taipei (8)
- Hong Kong (7)
- India (4)
- Indonesia (4)
- Iran (4)
- Japan (12)
- Jordan (7)
- Kazakhstan (6)
- Kyrgyzstan (2)
- Kuwait (7)
- Lebanon (1)
- Malaysia (11)
- Mongolia (1)
- Philippines (4)
- Qatar (25)
- Saudi Arabia (9)
- South Korea (16)
- Syria (7)
- Thailand (2)
- United Arab Emirates (14)
