= Equestrian at the 2010 Asian Games – Team dressage =

Team dressage at the 2010 Asian Games
- Venue: Guangzhou Equestrian Venue
- Date: 14 November 2010
- Competitors: 20 from 5 nations

Medalists
gold medal	South Korea; Choi Jun-sang, Kim Kyun-sub, Kim Dong-seon, Hwang Young-shik
silver medal	China; Gu Bing, Huang Zhuoqin, Cai Qiao, Liu Lina
bronze medal	Malaysia; Diani Lee, Qabil Ambak, Quzandria Nur, Putri Alia Soraya

Team dressage equestrian at the 2010 Asian Games was held in Guangzhou Equestrian Venue, Guangzhou, China on 14 November 2010.

Each horse and rider pair performed a FEI Prix St-Georges Test. The Prix St-Georges Test consists of a battery of required movements that each rider and horse pair performs. Five judges evaluate the pair, giving marks between 0 and 10 for each element. The judges' scores were averaged to give a final score for the pair. The best three scores from each team's four members were summed to give a team score. The results from this event also served as a qualifier for the individual dressage event.

== Schedule ==
All times are China Standard Time (UTC+08:00)

Date	Time	Event
Sunday, 14 November 2010	12:00	Prix St-Georges

== Results ==
Legend

- RT — Retired

Rank	Team	% score
1st place, gold medalist(s)	South Korea (KOR)	65.759
	Choi Jun-sang on Ricco	66.778
	Kim Kyun-sub on Hellani	~~61.778~~
	Kim Dong-seon on Pleasure 18	62.167
	Hwang Young-shik on Laura	68.333
2nd place, silver medalist(s)	China (CHN)	65.593
	Gu Bing on Donovan-Bailey	66.556
	Huang Zhuoqin on Uris	65.833
	Cai Qiao on Kosmopolit An	64.389
	Liu Lina on Cortez35	~~63.944~~
3rd place, bronze medalist(s)	Malaysia (MAS)	65.111
	Diani Lee on Stravinsky	63.500
	Qabil Ambak on Wup	66.111
	Quzandria Nur on Handsome	65.722
	Putri Alia Soraya on Odurin	~~62.722~~
4	Japan (JPN)	64.759
	Akihiro Shimoda on Loriot 347	~~62.833~~
	Shingo Hayashi on Olga	66.500
	Mayumi Ino on Niels	63.333
	Asuka Sakurai on Wesley S	64.444
5	Chinese Taipei (TPE)	60.722
	Yeh Hsiu-hua on Caramias Donna	63.889
	Chen Yi-tsung on Furstendonner AF	58.500
	Chang Fang-yu on Touche	59.778
	Lee Yuan on Helan Yihao	~~RT~~
