= Equestrian at the 2006 Asian Games – Individual dressage =

Individual dressage at the 2006 Asian Games
- Venue: Doha Racing & Equestrian Club
- Date: 4–5 December 2006
- Competitors: 25 from 7 nations

Medalists
gold medal	Choi Jun-sang	South Korea
silver medal	Yukiko Noge	Japan
bronze medal	Qabil Ambak	Malaysia

Individual dressage equestrian at the 2006 Asian Games was held in Equestrian Dressage Arena, Doha, Qatar from December 4 to 5, 2006. The event consisted of three rounds, Young Riders (YR) team test, Young Riders (YR) preliminary test (Prix St-Georges) and Young Riders (YR) freestyle test.

== Schedule ==
All times are Arabia Standard Time (UTC+03:00)

Date	Time	Event
Monday, 4 December 2006	09:00	YR team test
Tuesday, 5 December 2006	08:00	YR preliminary test
Tuesday, 5 December 2006	14:00	YR freestyle test

== Results ==
=== YR team ===
Rank	Athlete	Horse	% score
1	Suh Jung-kyun (KOR)	Caleostro	66.444
2	Yukiko Noge (JPN)	Lanchester Kouko	66.389
3	Qabil Ambak (MAS)	Charming 8	66.000
4	Choi Jun-sang (KOR)	Dancing Boy II	65.944
5	Quzandria Nur (MAS)	Havel	65.278
6	Shin Soo-jin (KOR)	M. Donner Boy II	64.944
7	Masanao Takahashi (JPN)	Cleveland 2	64.611
8	Jacqueline Siu (HKG)	Jamiro	62.389
9	Kim Dong-seon (KOR)	Pleasure 18	62.278
10	Omar Al-Mannai (QAT)	Walz of Flowers	62.000
11	Aram Gregory (HKG)	Lucky Star	61.667
12	Asuka Sakurai (JPN)	Watten Keiker	61.556
13	Kumiko Sakamoto (JPN)	Rabano	61.500
14	Putri Alia Soraya (MAS)	Chagall Junior	61.389
15	Diani Lee (MAS)	Antschar	60.833
16	Lin Chun-shen (TPE)	Pani	60.722
17	Natalya Yurkevich (KAZ)	Don Petro H.L.	60.667
18	Yeh Hsiu-hua (TPE)	Lear	60.556
19	Sergey Mironenko (KAZ)	Ispovednik	59.833
20	Ali Al-Mehshadi (QAT)	Donovan Bailey	59.722
21	Lily Zilo (HKG)	Windsor's Mira	59.222
22	Lee Yuan (TPE)	Laszlo 30	58.833
23	Hamam Al-Abdulla (QAT)	Ideal 44	58.389
24	Wejdan Al-Malki (QAT)	Ricon	57.000
25	Sergey Buikevich (KAZ)	Volan	55.944

=== YR preliminary ===
Rank	Athlete	Horse	YRP % score	YRT % score	Total
1	Choi Jun-sang (KOR)	Dancing Boy II	65.944	68.311	67.128
2	Yukiko Noge (JPN)	Lanchester Kouko	66.389	66.756	66.572
3	Qabil Ambak (MAS)	Charming 8	66.000	66.222	66.111
4	Suh Jung-kyun (KOR)	Caleostro	66.444	65.422	65.933
5	Masanao Takahashi (JPN)	Cleveland 2	64.611	64.711	64.661
6	Quzandria Nur (MAS)	Havel	65.278	62.889	64.083
7	Jacqueline Siu (HKG)	Jamiro	62.389	63.867	63.128
8	Omar Al-Mannai (QAT)	Walz of Flowers	62.000	63.467	62.733
9	Aram Gregory (HKG)	Lucky Star	61.667	61.867	61.767
10	Ali Al-Mehshadi (QAT)	Donovan Bailey	59.722	62.933	61.328
11	Natalya Yurkevich (KAZ)	Don Petro H.L.	60.667	61.822	61.244
12	Yeh Hsiu-hua (TPE)	Lear	60.556	59.156	59.856
13	Sergey Mironenko (KAZ)	Ispovednik	59.833	59.867	59.850
14	Lin Chun-shen (TPE)	Pani	60.722	58.800	59.761

=== YR freestyle ===
Rank	Athlete	Horse	YRP+YRT % score	YRF % score	Total
1st place, gold medalist(s)	Choi Jun-sang (KOR)	Dancing Boy II	67.128	71.550	68.602
2nd place, silver medalist(s)	Yukiko Noge (JPN)	Lanchester Kouko	66.572	68.200	67.115
3rd place, bronze medalist(s)	Qabil Ambak (MAS)	Charming 8	66.111	68.900	67.041
4	Suh Jung-kyun (KOR)	Caleostro	65.933	65.550	65.806
5	Masanao Takahashi (JPN)	Cleveland 2	64.661	66.500	65.274
6	Omar Al-Mannai (QAT)	Walz of Flowers	62.733	66.600	64.022
7	Jacqueline Siu (HKG)	Jamiro	63.128	65.750	64.002
8	Quzandria Nur (MAS)	Havel	64.083	60.500	62.889
9	Aram Gregory (HKG)	Lucky Star	61.767	65.100	62.878
10	Ali Al-Mehshadi (QAT)	Donovan Bailey	61.328	65.000	62.552
11	Natalya Yurkevich (KAZ)	Don Petro H.L.	61.244	61.500	61.330
12	Yeh Hsiu-hua (TPE)	Lear	59.856	61.550	60.420
