= Equestrian events at the 2014 Asian Games =

- Venue: Incheon Dream Park
- Dates: 20–30 September 2014
- Competitors: 100 from 15 nations

Equestrian events at the 2014 Asian Games were held in Dream Park Equestrian Venue, Incheon, South Korea from 20 September to 30 September 2014.

There were three equestrian disciplines: dressage, eventing and jumping. All three disciplines were further divided into individual and team contests for a total of six events.

== Schedule ==
●	Round	●	Last round	Q	Qualification	F	Final

Event↓/Date →	20th Sat	21st Sun	22nd Mon	23rd Tue	24th Wed	25th Thu	26th Fri	27th Sat	28th Sun	29th Mon	30th Tue
Individual dressage	Q	Q		F							
Team dressage	F										
Individual eventing					●	●	●				
Team eventing					●	●	●				
Individual jumping									Q		F
Team jumping									F		

== Medalists ==
Event	Gold	Silver	Bronze
Individual dressage	Hwang Young-shik; South Korea	Kim Dong-seon; South Korea	Larasati Gading; Indonesia
Team dressage	South Korea; Kim Kyun-sub; Chung Yoo-yeon; Kim Dong-seon; Hwang Young-shik	Japan; Mayumi Okunishi; Kazuki Sado; Tomoko Nakamura; Shingo Hayashi	Chinese Taipei; Wang Ko-wen; Chang Yu-chieh; Kuo Li-yu; Yeh Hsiu-hua
Individual eventing	Song Sang-wuk; South Korea	Hua Tian; China	Bang Si-re; South Korea
Team eventing	South Korea; Cheon Jai-sik; Hong Won-jae; Bang Si-re; Song Sang-wuk	Japan; Tae Sato; Takanori Kusunoki; Ryuzo Kitajima; Toshiyuki Tanaka	Hong Kong; Thomas Heffernan Ho; Nicole Fardel; Annie Ho
Individual jumping	Abdullah Al-Sharbatly; Saudi Arabia	Satoshi Hirao; Japan	Taizo Sugitani; Japan
Team jumping	Qatar; Nasser Al-Ghazali; Ali Al-Thani; Khalid Al-Emadi; Bassem Hassan Mohammed	Saudi Arabia; Faisal Al-Shalan; Abdulrahman Al-Rajhi; Salman Al-Maqadi; Abdullah Al-Sharbatly	Japan; Satoshi Hirao; Takashi Utsunomiya; Tadahiro Hayashi; Taizo Sugitani

== Medal table ==
Rank	Nation	Gold	Silver	Bronze	Total
1	South Korea (KOR)	4	1	1	6
2	Saudi Arabia (KSA)	1	1	0	2
3	Qatar (QAT)	1	0	0	1
4	Japan (JPN)	0	3	2	5
5	China (CHN)	0	1	0	1
6	Chinese Taipei (TPE)	0	0	1	1
6	Hong Kong (HKG)	0	0	1	1
6	Indonesia (INA)	0	0	1	1
Totals (8 entries)		6	6	6	18

== Participating nations ==
A total of 100 athletes from 15 nations competed in equestrian events at the 2014 Asian Games:

- China (8)
- Chinese Taipei (8)
- Hong Kong (8)
- India (11)
- Indonesia (4)
- Japan (12)
- Kazakhstan (3)
- Kuwait (1)
- Philippines (4)
- Qatar (8)
- Saudi Arabia (4)
- Singapore (2)
- South Korea (12)
- Thailand (11)
- United Arab Emirates (4)
