= Equestrian at the 2006 Asian Games – Team dressage =

Team dressage at the 2006 Asian Games
- Venue: Doha Racing & Equestrian Club
- Date: 4 December 2006
- Competitors: 25 from 7 nations

Medalists
gold medal	South Korea; Choi Jun-sang, Kim Dong-seon, Shin Soo-jin, Suh Jung-kyun
silver medal	Malaysia; Diani Lee, Putri Alia Soraya, Quzandria Nur, Qabil Ambak
bronze medal	Japan; Kumiko Sakamoto, Masanao Takahashi, Asuka Sakurai, Yukiko Noge

Team dressage equestrian at the 2006 Asian Games was held in Equestrian Dressage Arena, Doha, Qatar on December 4, 2006. The event consisted of one round, Young Riders (YR) team test.

== Schedule ==
All times are Arabia Standard Time (UTC+03:00)

Date	Time	Event
Monday, 4 December 2006	09:00	YR team test

== Results ==
Rank	Team	% score
1st place, gold medalist(s)	South Korea (KOR)	65.777
	Choi Jun-sang on Dancing Boy II	65.944
	Kim Dong-seon on Pleasure 18	~~62.278~~
	Shin Soo-jin on M. Donner Boy II	64.944
	Suh Jung-kyun on Caleostro	66.444
2nd place, silver medalist(s)	Malaysia (MAS)	64.222
	Diani Lee on Antschar	~~60.833~~
	Putri Alia Soraya on Chagall Junior	61.389
	Quzandria Nur on Havel	65.278
	Qabil Ambak on Charming 8	66.000
3rd place, bronze medalist(s)	Japan (JPN)	64.185
	Kumiko Sakamoto on Rabano	~~61.500~~
	Masanao Takahashi on Cleveland 2	64.611
	Asuka Sakurai on Watten Keiker	61.556
	Yukiko Noge on Lanchester Kouko	66.389
4	Hong Kong (HKG)	61.093
	Lily Zilo on Windsor's Mira	59.222
	Jacqueline Siu on Jamiro	62.389
	Aram Gregory on Lucky Star	61.667
5	Chinese Taipei (TPE)	60.037
	Lee Yuan on Laszlo 30	58.833
	Lin Chun-shen on Pani	60.722
	Yeh Hsiu-hua on Lear	60.556
6	Qatar (QAT)	60.037
	Wejdan Al-Malki on Ricon	~~57.000~~
	Hamam Al-Abdulla on Ideal 44	58.389
	Ali Al-Mehshadi on Donovan Bailey	59.722
	Omar Al-Mannai on Walz of Flowers	62.000
7	Kazakhstan (KAZ)	58.815
	Sergey Mironenko on Ispovednik	59.833
	Natalya Yurkevich on Don Petro H.L.	60.667
	Sergey Buikevich on Volan	55.944
