= Equestrian events at the 2010 Asian Games =

- Venue: Guangzhou Equestrian Venue
- Dates: 14–24 November 2010
- Competitors: 92 from 16 nations

Equestrian events at the 2010 Asian Games were held in Guangzhou Equestrian Venue, Conghua, Guangdong, China from 14 November to 24 November 2010.

There were three equestrian disciplines: dressage, eventing and jumping. All three disciplines were further divided into individual and team contests for a total of six events.

After the Games, Guangzhou Equestrian Venue was bought by Hong Kong Jockey Club, and rebuilt to create Conghua Racechouse.

== Schedule ==
●	Round	●	Last round	Q	Qualification	F	Final

Event↓/Date →	14th Sun	15th Mon	16th Tue	17th Wed	18th Thu	19th Fri	20th Sat	21st Sun	22nd Mon	23rd Tue	24th Wed
Individual dressage	Q	Q		F							
Team dressage	F										
Individual eventing					●	●	●				
Team eventing					●	●	●				
Individual jumping									Q		F
Team jumping									F		

== Medalists ==
Event	Gold	Silver	Bronze
Individual dressage	Hwang Young-shik; South Korea	Quzandria Nur; Malaysia	Qabil Ambak; Malaysia
Team dressage	South Korea; Choi Jun-sang; Kim Kyun-sub; Kim Dong-seon; Hwang Young-shik	China; Gu Bing; Huang Zhuoqin; Cai Qiao; Liu Lina	Malaysia; Diani Lee; Qabil Ambak; Quzandria Nur; Putri Alia Soraya
Individual eventing	Kenki Sato; Japan	Cheon Jai-sik; South Korea	Yoshiaki Oiwa; Japan
Team eventing	Japan; Yoshiaki Oiwa; Atsushi Negishi; Takayuki Yumira; Kenki Sato	Thailand; Weerapat Pitakanonda; Promton Kingwan; Nina Ligon; Terri Impson	China; Li Jingmin; Liu Tongyan; Yang Hua; Liang Ruiji
Individual jumping	Ramzy Al-Duhami; Saudi Arabia	Latifa Al-Maktoum; United Arab Emirates	Khaled Al-Eid; Saudi Arabia
Team jumping	Saudi Arabia; Ramzy Al-Duhami; Khaled Al-Eid; Abdullah Al-Saud; Abdullah Al-Sharbatly	United Arab Emirates; Latifa Al-Maktoum; Majid Al-Qassimi; Ahmed Al-Junaibi; Rashid Al-Maktoum	Hong Kong; Kenneth Cheng; Patrick Lam; Samantha Lam; Jacqueline Lai

== Medal table ==
Rank	Nation	Gold	Silver	Bronze	Total
1	South Korea (KOR)	2	1	0	3
2	Japan (JPN)	2	0	1	3
2	Saudi Arabia (KSA)	2	0	1	3
4	United Arab Emirates (UAE)	0	2	0	2
5	Malaysia (MAS)	0	1	2	3
6	China (CHN)	0	1	1	2
7	Thailand (THA)	0	1	0	1
8	Hong Kong (HKG)	0	0	1	1
Totals (8 entries)		6	6	6	18

== Participating nations ==
A total of 92 athletes from 16 nations competed in equestrian events at the 2010 Asian Games:

- Bahrain (1)
- Brunei (1)
- China (12)
- Chinese Taipei (8)
- Hong Kong (10)
- India (1)
- Japan (13)
- Kazakhstan (4)
- Malaysia (6)
- Qatar (8)
- Saudi Arabia (4)
- Singapore (1)
- South Korea (12)
- Syria (1)
- Thailand (5)
- United Arab Emirates (5)
