= Equestrian at the 2002 Asian Games – Individual eventing =

Individual eventing at the 2002 Asian Games
- Venue: Busan Equestrian Grounds
- Date: 2–4 October 2002
- Competitors: 22 from 5 nations

Medalists
gold medal	Pongsiree Bunluewong	Thailand
silver medal	Cheon Sang-yong	South Korea
bronze medal	Daisuke Kato	Japan

Individual eventing equestrian at the 2002 Asian Games was held in Busan Equestrian Grounds, Busan, South Korea from October 2 to October 4, 2002.

== Schedule ==
All times are Korea Standard Time (UTC+09:00)

Date	Time	Event
Wednesday, 2 October 2002	09:30	Dressage
Thursday, 3 October 2002	10:00	Cross-country
Friday, 4 October 2002	11:30	Jumping

== Results ==
Legend

- EL — Eliminated

Rank	Athlete	Horse	Dressage	Cross-country			Jumping			Total
Rank	Athlete	Horse	Dressage	Jump	Time	Total	Jump	Time	Total	Total
1st place, gold medalist(s)	Pongsiree Bunluewong (THA)	Mr. A	47.17			0.00	4		4.00	51.17
2nd place, silver medalist(s)	Cheon Sang-yong (KOR)	Sun Smart	50.65			0.00	4		4.00	54.65
3rd place, bronze medalist(s)	Daisuke Kato (JPN)	Akwaba	54.78			0.00			0.00	54.78
4	Sachiko Kodera (JPN)	Marringanee	55.00			0.00	4		4.00	59.00
5	Heo Jun-sung (KOR)	Foxdale Wild Card	56.52			0.00	4		4.00	60.52
6	Kim Kyun-sub (KOR)	Hat Trick	58.48			0.00		3	3.00	61.48
7	Masaru Fuse (JPN)	In Transit	49.35			0.00	8	5	13.00	62.35
8	Weerapat Pitakanonda (THA)	Northern Cosmo	56.52			0.00	8		8.00	64.52
8	Masami Toda (HKG)	Coolgardie	56.52			0.00	8		8.00	64.52
10	Indrajit Lamba (IND)	Tipsy	64.57		0.80	0.80			0.00	65.37
11	Kim Hyung-chil (KOR)	Bundaberg Black	51.74	20		20.00		2	2.00	73.74
12	Shigeyuki Hosono (JPN)	Coconut	74.57			0.00		2	2.00	76.57
13	Bhagirath Singh (IND)	Sagar	66.52			0.00	12		12.00	78.52
14	Rajesh Pattu (IND)	Shahzada	62.39		4.80	4.80	12	1	13.00	80.19
15	Supap Khawngam (THA)	Starlight	62.83			0.00	24		24.00	86.83
16	Hamish McAuley (HKG)	Jiggalong	63.26	20		20.00	8		8.00	91.26
17	Daniel Palmer (HKG)	Snowy II	75.00			0.00	12	7	19.00	94.00
18	Deep Kumar Ahlawat (IND)	Mirza	72.83		43.60	43.60			0.00	116.43
19	Nicole Fardel (HKG)	Little Madam IV	69.35			0.00	36	31	67.00	136.35
20	Kim Hong-chul (KOR)	Wondaree Time's Right	48.26	80	23.2	103.20	4		4.00	155.46
—	Kiatnarong Klongkarn (THA)	Chor Chuthima	64.57			0.00			EL	EL
—	Kemtida Osathapan (THA)	Perfect Plan	57.83			EL				EL
