= Equestrian at the 2002 Asian Games – Team eventing =

Team eventing at the 2002 Asian Games
- Venue: Busan Equestrian Grounds
- Date: 2–4 October 2002
- Competitors: 20 from 5 nations

Medalists
gold medal	Japan; Daisuke Kato, Sachiko Kodera, Masaru Fuse, Shigeyuki Hosono
silver medal	South Korea; Cheon Sang-yong, Kim Kyun-sub, Kim Hyung-chil, Kim Hong-chul
bronze medal	India; Indrajit Lamba, Bhagirath Singh, Rajesh Pattu, Deep Kumar Ahlawat

Team eventing equestrian at the 2002 Asian Games was held in Busan Equestrian Grounds, Busan, South Korea from October 2 to October 4, 2002.

== Schedule ==
All times are Korea Standard Time (UTC+09:00)

Date	Time	Event
Wednesday, 2 October 2002	09:30	Dressage
Thursday, 3 October 2002	10:00	Cross-country
Friday, 4 October 2002	11:30	Jumping

== Results ==
Legend

- EL — Eliminated

Rank	Team	Penalties			Total
Rank	Team	Dressage	X-country	Jumping	Total
1st place, gold medalist(s)	Japan (JPN)	159.13	0.00	17.00	176.13
	Daisuke Kato on Akwaba	54.78	0.00	0.00	54.78
	Sachiko Kodera on Marringanee	55.00	0.00	4.00	59.00
	Masaru Fuse on In Transit	49.35	0.00	13.00	62.35
	Shigeyuki Hosono on Coconut	~~74.57~~	~~0.00~~	~~2.00~~	~~76.57~~
2nd place, silver medalist(s)	South Korea (KOR)	160.87	20.00	9.00	189.87
	Cheon Sang-yong on Sun Smart	50.65	0.00	4.00	54.65
	Kim Kyun-sub on Hat Trick	58.48	0.00	3.00	61.48
	Kim Hyung-chil on Bundaberg Black	51.74	20.00	2.00	73.74
	Kim Hong-chul on Wondaree Time's Right	~~48.26~~	~~103.20~~	~~4.00~~	~~155.46~~
3rd place, bronze medalist(s)	India (IND)	193.48	5.60	25.00	224.08
	Indrajit Lamba on Tipsy	64.57	0.80	0.00	65.37
	Bhagirath Singh on Sagar	66.52	0.00	12.00	78.52
	Rajesh Pattu on Shahzada	62.39	4.80	13.00	80.19
	Deep Kumar Ahlawat on Mirza	~~72.83~~	~~43.60~~	~~0.00~~	~~116.43~~
4	Hong Kong (HKG)	194.78	20.00	35.00	249.78
	Masami Toda on Coolgardie	56.52	0.00	8.00	64.52
	Hamish McAuley on Jiggalong	63.26	20.00	8.00	91.26
	Daniel Palmer on Snowy II	75.00	0.00	19.00	94.00
	Nicole Fardel on Little Madam IV	~~69.35~~	~~0.00~~	~~67.00~~	~~136.35~~
5	Thailand (THA)	168.26	0.00	947.43	1115.69
	Pongsiree Bunluewong on Mr. A	47.17	0.00	4.00	51.17
	Weerapat Pitakanonda on Northern Cosmo	56.52	0.00	8.00	64.52
	Kiatnarong Klongkarn on Chor Chuthima	64.57	0.00	EL	1000.00
	Kemtida Osathapan on Perfect Plan	~~57.83~~	~~EL~~		~~1000.00~~
