= Equestrian at the 2014 Asian Games – Individual eventing =

Individual eventing at the 2014 Asian Games
- Venue: Incheon Dream Park
- Date: 24–26 September 2014
- Competitors: 27 from 7 nations

Medalists
gold medal	Song Sang-wuk	South Korea
silver medal	Hua Tian	China
bronze medal	Bang Si-re	South Korea

Individual eventing equestrian at the 2014 Asian Games was held in Dream Park Equestrian Venue, Incheon, South Korea from September 24 to 26, 2014.

== Schedule ==
All times are Korea Standard Time (UTC+09:00)

Date	Time	Event
Wednesday, 24 September 2014	08:00	Dressage
Thursday, 25 September 2014	09:00	Cross-country
Friday, 26 September 2014	13:00	Jumping

== Results ==
Legend

- EL — Eliminated
- RT — Retired
- WD — Withdrawn

Rank	Athlete	Horse	Dressage	Cross-country			Jumping			Total
Rank	Athlete	Horse	Dressage	Jump	Time	Total	Jump	Time	Total	Total
1st place, gold medalist(s)	Song Sang-wuk (KOR)	FRH Fantasia	37.90			0.00			0.00	37.90
2nd place, silver medalist(s)	Hua Tian (CHN)	Temujin	38.10			0.00		3	3.00	41.10
3rd place, bronze medalist(s)	Bang Si-re (KOR)	Thomas O'Mally 2	41.30			0.00			0.00	41.30
4	Annie Ho (HKG)	Baxo	43.50			0.00			0.00	43.50
5	Toshiyuki Tanaka (JPN)	Marquis de Plescop	40.40			0.00	4		4.00	44.40
6	Ryuzo Kitajima (JPN)	Just Chocolate	44.40		1.60	1.60			0.00	46.00
7	Liang Ruiji (CHN)	Vasthi	47.50			0.00			0.00	47.50
8	Ajai Appachu (IND)	Cocky Locky	45.60			0.00	4		4.00	49.60
9	Takanori Kusunoki (JPN)	Fairbanks Cargo	51.70		0.40	0.40			0.00	52.10
10	Fouaad Mirza (IND)	Penultimate Vision	45.20		3.60	3.60	4		4.00	52.80
11	Hong Won-jae (KOR)	Calloa van het Kloosterhof	49.40		0.40	0.40	4		4.00	53.80
12	Nicole Fardel (HKG)	The Navigator	50.20		0.40	0.40	4		4.00	54.60
13	Thomas Heffernan Ho (HKG)	Zibor	51.70			0.00	4		4.00	55.70
14	Tae Sato (JPN)	Toy Boy	52.30			0.00	4		4.00	56.30
15	Supanut Wannakool (THA)	Tzar of Her Dreams	53.70		1.60	1.60	4		4.00	59.30
16	Cheon Jai-sik (KOR)	Pilot Cutter	43.10	20		20.00			0.00	63.10
17	Fuangvich Aniruth-deva (THA)	Ridano Elmy	47.30		21.20	21.20	4		4.00	72.50
18	Hadi Al-Marri (QAT)	Drum Mousse	65.00		6.40	6.40	8		8.00	79.40
19	Li Jingmin (CHN)	Zhendeyi	65.20		5.60	5.60	12	1	13.00	83.80
20	Mrityunjay Singh Rathore (IND)	Fleece Clover	53.70	20	12.40	32.40			0.00	86.10
21	Supap Khawngam (THA)	Ardbohill Lad	64.80		21.60	21.60	8		8.00	94.40
22	Sangram Singh (IND)	Ramases	61.20	20	29.60	49.60	8		8.00	118.80
—	Hassan Al-Naimi (QAT)	Leslie Ann 2	49.40	40	10.00	50.00			EL	EL
—	Promton Kingwan (THA)	Kaiserstern 3	47.90		14.40	14.40			WD	WD
—	Ali Al-Marri (QAT)	Fernhill Friendly Touch	49.40			RT				RT
—	Manif Al-Naimi (QAT)	Graffiti de Lully CH	52.10			EL				EL
—	Lu Junhong (CHN)	Watch Out	54.80			EL				EL
