= Equestrian at the 2002 Asian Games – Individual dressage =

Individual dressage at the 2002 Asian Games
- Venue: Busan Equestrian Grounds
- Date: 8–10 October 2002
- Competitors: 22 from 7 nations

Medalists
| gold medal | Choi Jun-sang | South Korea |
| silver medal | Suh Jung-kyun | South Korea |
| bronze medal | Naoki Hitomi | Japan |

Individual dressage equestrian at the 2002 Asian Games was held in Busan Equestrian Grounds, Busan, South Korea from October 8 to 10, 2002.

== Schedule ==
All times are Korea Standard Time (UTC+09:00)

| Date | Time | Event |
|---|---|---|
| Tuesday, 8 October 2002 | 09:00 | Qualification |
| Thursday, 10 October 2002 | 09:00 | Final |

== Results ==
=== Qualification ===
| Rank | Athlete | Horse | % score |
|---|---|---|---|
| 1 | Choi Jun-sang (KOR) | Dancing Boy | 69.771 |
| 2 | Hiroyuki Kitahara (JPN) | Usagi Yojinbo | 66.457 |
| 3 | Naoki Hitomi (JPN) | Sion's Boy | 66.171 |
| 4 | Suh Jung-kyun (KOR) | Anycall | 65.143 |
| 5 | Quzandria Nur (MAS) | Grey Cottage | 64.857 |
| 6 | Shin Chang-moo (KOR) | Regal | 64.686 |
| 7 | Aram Gregory (HKG) | Loki II | 64.000 |
| 8 | Putri Alia Soraya (MAS) | Chagall Junior | 63.714 |
| 9 | Masumi Yokokawa (JPN) | Movie Star | 63.429 |
| 10 | Yuriko Miyoshi (JPN) | Why Me | 62.171 |
| 11 | Atchakorn Phromyothi (THA) | Deauville | 62.057 |
| 12 | Huang Zhuoqin (CHN) | Xifang Shenshi | 60.286 |
| 13 | Kim Jung-keun (KOR) | Tengo | 59.657 |
| 14 | Zhang Lijun (CHN) | Nureyer | 58.914 |
| 15 | Gu Bing (CHN) | Helan Erhao | 58.629 |
| 16 | Chaleamchan Chamnankitch (THA) | Mr. Wong | 58.114 |
| 17 | Chanya Srifuengfung (THA) | Hexagano | 57.029 |
| 18 | Sunil Shiv Das (IND) | Rampage | 56.857 |
| 19 | Suwat Bunlue (THA) | Ferdinant | 54.914 |
| 20 | Sandeep Dewan (IND) | Tamara | 53.714 |
| 21 | Mritunjay Rathore (IND) | Tusker | 52.229 |
| 22 | Vishal Bishnoi (IND) | Tanala | 48.743 |

=== Final ===
| Rank | Athlete | Horse | % score |
|---|---|---|---|
| 1st place, gold medalist(s) | Choi Jun-sang (KOR) | Dancing Boy | 70.649 |
| 2nd place, silver medalist(s) | Suh Jung-kyun (KOR) | Anycall | 66.865 |
| 3rd place, bronze medalist(s) | Naoki Hitomi (JPN) | Sion's Boy | 66.811 |
| 4 | Hiroyuki Kitahara (JPN) | Usagi Yojinbo | 66.162 |
| 5 | Quzandria Nur (MAS) | Grey Cottage | 64.595 |
| 6 | Shin Chang-moo (KOR) | Regal | 63.514 |
| 7 | Aram Gregory (HKG) | Loki II | 62.973 |
| 8 | Putri Alia Soraya (MAS) | Chagall Junior | 62.432 |
| 9 | Masumi Yokokawa (JPN) | Movie Star | 61.730 |
| 10 | Huang Zhuoqin (CHN) | Xifang Shenshi | 61.243 |
| 11 | Atchakorn Phromyothi (THA) | Deauville | 61.027 |
| 12 | Zhang Lijun (CHN) | Nureyer | 59.838 |
