= Yurkevich =

Yurkevich (Russian: Юркевич) is a gender-neutral Slavic surname that may refer to

- Aleksandr Yurkevich (1942–2011), Russian Olympic wrestler
- Darya Yurkevich (born 1988), Belarusian biathlete
- Natalya Yurkevich (born 1967), Kazakhstani dressage rider
- Pamfil Yurkevich (1826–1874), Russian philosopher
- Vladimir Yurkevich (1885–1964), Russian naval engineer
