= Equestrian at the 2006 Asian Games – Individual eventing =

Individual eventing at the 2006 Asian Games
- Venue: Doha Racing & Equestrian Club
- Date: 6–8 December 2006
- Competitors: 32 from 9 nations

Medalists
gold medal	Yoshiaki Oiwa	Japan
silver medal	Abdulla Al-Ejail	Qatar
bronze medal	Husref Malek	Malaysia

Individual eventing equestrian at the 2006 Asian Games was held in Doha Equestrian Arena, Doha, Qatar from December 6 to December 8, 2006.

South Korean equestrian athlete Kim Hyung-chil died after falling off his horse on the morning of December 7 during the cross country competition which took place in the rain. The accident occurred at jump number eight during the cross-country stage. After the horse, named Bundaberg Black, rolled over him, he was taken to the hospital, with his death later confirmed by the organizing committee.

== Schedule ==
All times are Arabia Standard Time (UTC+03:00)

Date	Time	Event
Wednesday, 6 December 2006	09:00	Dressage
Thursday, 7 December 2006	09:00	Cross-country
Friday, 8 December 2006	09:00	Jumping

== Results ==
Legend

- EL — Eliminated
- RT — Retired
- WD — Withdrawn

Rank	Athlete	Horse	Dressage	Cross-country			Jumping			Total
Rank	Athlete	Horse	Dressage	Jump	Time	Total	Jump	Time	Total	Total
1st place, gold medalist(s)	Yoshiaki Oiwa (JPN)	Khanjer Black	40.50			0.00	4		4.00	44.50
2nd place, silver medalist(s)	Abdulla Al-Ejail (QAT)	Quinten	46.70			0.00			0.00	46.70
3rd place, bronze medalist(s)	Husref Malek (MAS)	Dashper	53.30			0.00	4		4.00	57.30
4	Bhagirath Singh (IND)	Guddu	58.80		2.40	2.40			0.00	61.20
5	Johari Lee (MAS)	Star Portrait	61.70			0.00			0.00	61.70
6	Rajesh Pattu (IND)	Shahzada	51.40		6.40	6.40	4		4.00	61.80
7	Rashid Al-Marri (QAT)	Bonny C	56.20			0.00	8	2	10.00	66.20
8	Awad Al-Qahtani (QAT)	Langata Son	59.80		3.60	3.60	4	2	6.00	69.40
9	Dikie Mardiyanto (INA)	Aswatama R-Jay	54.50		7.60	7.60	8		8.00	70.10
10	Endarjanto Bambang (INA)	Aswatama Frankie Jay	50.70	20		20.00			0.00	70.70
11	Rashid Al-Hosani (UAE)	Jerico des Bejuy	73.10			0.00			0.00	73.10
12	Saif Omar Thabet (UAE)	Mexico de Poncenat	61.70		4.00	4.00	8		8.00	73.70
13	Promton Kingwan (THA)	Mister Moss	63.80		8.40	8.40	4		4.00	76.20
14	Ikko Murakami (JPN)	Intoransit	59.50		5.20	5.20	8	5	13.00	77.70
15	Majed Al-Kaabi (QAT)	Odin's Pride	60.20		2.00	2.00	8	10	18.00	80.20
16	Shigeyuki Hosono (JPN)	Ipeca	50.70		11.20	11.20	20		20.00	81.90
17	Ali Al-Marri (QAT)	Reality Z	53.30		0.80	0.80	24	13	37.00	91.10
18	Weerapat Pitakanonda (THA)	Kelecyn Emperor	78.30		5.20	5.20	8	1	9.00	92.50
19	Rashed Al-Rumaithi (UAE)	Lazlo de Normal	62.90	20	7.20	27.20	8		8.00	98.10
20	Abdulrahman Al-Habsi (UAE)	Marquis de Dun	68.60	20	6.80	26.80	8		8.00	103.40
21	Asep Lesmana (INA)	Aswatama Nottage H.	70.20		17.20	17.20	16	2	18.00	105.40
22	Abdullah Al-Shuaibi (UAE)	Marius d'Argouges	77.60		2.80	2.80	12	14	26.00	106.40
23	Deep Kumar Ahlawat (IND)	Tipu	60.70	20	13.20	33.20	28		28.00	121.90
24	Daisuke Kato (JPN)	Homme du Gue	53.30	80	34.00	114.00	8		8.00	175.30
25	Amir Zulkefle (MAS)	Aachen	68.10	80	28.80	108.80	12		12.00	188.90
—	Andry Prasetyono (INA)	Aswatama Sportzgirl	56.40	25		25.00			EL	EL
—	Heo Jun-sung (KOR)	Foxdale Wild Card	67.40		7.60	7.60			WD	WD
—	Sohn Bong-gak (KOR)	Wondaree Time's Right	65.70			WD				WD
—	Cheon Jai-sik (KOR)	Hat Trick	64.30			WD				WD
—	Kim Hyung-chil (KOR)	Bundaberg Black	66.40			RT				RT
—	Palwinder Singh (IND)	Naksh	60.00			EL				EL
—	Chiang Han-ju (TPE)	Game Boy	53.80			EL				EL
