= Equestrian at the 2022 Asian Games – Individual eventing =

Individual eventing at the 2022 Asian Games
- Venue: Tonglu Equestrian Centre
- Dates: 30 September – 2 October 2023
- Competitors: 19 from 5 nations

Medalists
gold medal	Hua Tian	China
silver medal	Korntawat Samran	Thailand
bronze medal	Kazuhiro Yoshizawa	Japan

The individual eventing in equestrian at the 2022 Asian Games was held at the Tonglu Equestrian Centre from 30 September to 2 October 2023.

== Schedule ==
All times are China Standard Time (UTC+08:00)

Date	Time	Round
Monday, 30 September 2023	08:00	Dressage
Tuesday, 1 October 2023	08:00	Cross-country
Wednesday, 2 October 2023	09:30	Jumping

== Ground Jury ==
The Ground Jury during the 2022 Asian Games was nominated as follows;

Ground jury panel for the Eventing:

- (New Zealand) Helen Christie (Ground Jury President)
- (Republic of Ireland) David Lee (Ground Jury Member)
- (Thailand) Fuangvich Aniruth-Deva (Ground Jury Member)
- (United Kingdom) Andrew Griffiths (Technical Delegate)

== Results ==
Legend

- EL — Eliminated
- WD — Withdrawn

Rank	Athlete	Horse	Dressage	Cross-country			Jumping			Total
Rank	Athlete	Horse	Dressage	Jump	Time	Total	Jump	Time	Total	Total
1st place, gold medalist(s)	Hua Tian (CHN)	Poseidon Admiral	27.00	0.00	0.00	0.00	0.00	0.00	0.00	27.00
2nd place, silver medalist(s)	Korntawat Samran (THA)	Billy Elmy	27.90	0.00	0.00	0.00	0.00	0.00	0.00	27.90
3rd place, bronze medalist(s)	Kazuhiro Yoshizawa (JPN)	Penny Grans	28.60	0.00	0.00	0.00	0.00	0.00	0.00	28.60
4	Sun Huadong (CHN)	Lady Chin V't Moerven Z	29.60	0.00	0.00	0.00	0.00	0.00	0.00	29.60
5	Bao Yingfeng (CHN)	Newmarket Ritz	30.20	0.00	0.00	0.00	0.00	0.00	0.00	30.20
6	Yusuke Nakajima (JPN)	Credit Krunch	31.60	0.00	0.00	0.00	0.00	0.00	0.00	31.60
7	Weerapat Pitakanonda (THA)	Carnival March	31.80	0.00	0.00	0.00	0.00	0.00	0.00	31.80
8	Annie Ho (HKG)	Jockey Club Miss Matana	28.30	0.00	0.00	0.00	4.00	0.00	4.00	32.30
9	Shoto Kusumoto (JPN)	Vick Du Gisors Jra	32.50	0.00	0.00	0.00	0.00	0.00	0.00	32.50
10	Patrick Lam (HKG)	Jockey Club Highdown March	28.30	0.00	0.40	4.00	4.00	0.00	4.00	32.70
11	Preecha Khunjan (THA)	Clair De Lune Blanc Rw	34.20	0.00	0.00	0.00	0.00	0.00	0.00	34.20
12	Apurva Kishor Dabhade (IND)	Valtho des Peulpliers	29.60	0.00	0.00	0.00	4.00	2.40	6.40	36.00
13	Vikas Kumar (IND)	Noreway Harry	32.40	0.00	8.80	8.80	0.00	0.00	0.00	41.20
14	Supap Khaw-Ngam (THA)	Canadian Club M	32.20	11.00	0.00	11.00	0.00	0.00	0.00	43.20
15	Alisherjon Erkinov (UZB)	Jangcy L	37.80	0.00	1.20	1.20	4.00	7.20	11.20	50.20
16	Daniella Lin (HKG)	A Sparkling Bellini	38.60	0.00	0.00	0.00	20	0.40	20.40	59.00
17	Park Soo-il (KOR)	Fierte Duboisdelanoue	35.50	20	3.60	23.60	0.00	0.00	0.00	59.10
18	Su Yu Xuan (HKG)	Spypark Ferro Xs	30.20	20	10.40	30.40	8.00	0.00	8.00	60.60
—	Liang Ruiji (CHN)	Kiriaantje	28.60	0.00	7.20	7.20	WD			
—	Kenta Hiranaga (JPN)	Duke of Sussex	30.50	EL						
—	Ashish Vivek Limaye (IND)	Willy Be Dun	26.90	EL						
