= Equestrian at the 2014 Asian Games – Team eventing =

Team eventing at the 2014 Asian Games
- Venue: Incheon Dream Park
- Date: 24–26 September 2014
- Competitors: 27 from 7 nations

Medalists
gold medal	South Korea; Cheon Jai-sik, Hong Won-jae, Bang Si-re, Song Sang-wuk
silver medal	Japan; Tae Sato, Takanori Kusunoki, Ryuzo Kitajima, Toshiyuki Tanaka
bronze medal	Hong Kong; Thomas Heffernan Ho, Nicole Fardel, Annie Ho

Team eventing equestrian at the 2014 Asian Games was held in Dream Park Equestrian Venue, Incheon, South Korea from December 24 to September 26, 2014.

== Schedule ==
All times are Korea Standard Time (UTC+09:00)

Date	Time	Event
Wednesday, 24 September 2014	08:00	Dressage
Thursday, 25 September 2014	09:00	Cross-country
Friday, 26 September 2014	13:00	Jumping

== Results ==
Legend

- EL — Eliminated
- RT — Retired
- WD — Withdrawn

Rank	Team	Penalties			Total
Rank	Team	Dressage	X-country	Jumping	Total
1st place, gold medalist(s)	South Korea (KOR)	128.60	0.40	4.00	133.00
	Cheon Jai-sik on Pilot Cutter	~~43.10~~	~~20.00~~	~~0.00~~	~~63.10~~
	Hong Won-jae on Calloa van het Kloosterhof	49.40	0.40	4.00	53.80
	Bang Si-re on Thomas O'Mally 2	41.30	0.00	0.00	41.30
	Song Sang-wuk on FRH Fantasia	37.90	0.00	0.00	37.90
2nd place, silver medalist(s)	Japan (JPN)	136.50	2.00	4.00	142.50
	Tae Sato on Toy Boy	~~52.30~~	~~0.00~~	~~4.00~~	~~56.30~~
	Takanori Kusunoki on Fairbanks Cargo	51.70	0.40	0.00	52.10
	Ryuzo Kitajima on Just Chocolate	44.40	1.60	0.00	46.00
	Toshiyuki Tanaka on Marquis de Plescop	40.40	0.00	4.00	44.40
3rd place, bronze medalist(s)	Hong Kong (HKG)	145.40	0.40	8.00	153.80
	Thomas Heffernan Ho on Zibor	51.70	0.00	4.00	55.70
	Nicole Fardel on The Navigator	50.20	0.40	4.00	54.60
	Annie Ho on Baxo	43.50	0.00	0.00	43.50
4	China (CHN)	150.80	5.60	16.00	172.40
	Lu Junhong on Watch Out	~~54.80~~	~~EL~~		~~1000.00~~
	Li Jingmin on Zhendeyi	65.20	5.60	13.00	83.80
	Liang Ruiji on Vasthi	47.50	0.00	0.00	47.50
	Hua Tian on Temujin	38.10	0.00	3.00	41.10
5	India (IND)	144.50	36.00	8.00	188.50
	Sangram Singh on Ramases	~~61.20~~	~~49.60~~	~~8.00~~	~~118.80~~
	Mrityunjay Singh Rathore on Fleece Clover	53.70	32.40	0.00	86.10
	Fouaad Mirza on Penultimate Vision	45.20	3.60	4.00	52.80
	Ajai Appachu on Cocky Locky	45.60	0.00	4.00	49.60
6	Thailand (THA)	165.80	44.40	16.00	226.20
	Promton Kingwan on Kaiserstern 3	~~47.90~~	~~14.40~~	~~WD~~	~~1000.00~~
	Supap Khawngam on Ardbohill Lad	64.80	21.60	8.00	94.40
	Fuangvich Aniruth-deva on Ridano Elmy	47.30	21.20	4.00	72.50
	Supanut Wannakool on Tzar of Her Dreams	53.70	1.60	4.00	59.30
7	Qatar (QAT)	166.50	1904.90	8.00	2079.40
	Ali Al-Marri on Fernhill Friendly Touch	49.40	RT		1000.00
	Manif Al-Naimi on Graffiti de Lully CH	52.10	EL		1000.00
	Hassan Al-Naimi on Leslie Ann 2	~~49.40~~	~~50.00~~	~~EL~~	~~1000.00~~
	Hadi Al-Marri on Drum Mousse	65.00	6.40	8.00	79.40
