= Equestrian at the 1998 Asian Games – Team eventing =

Team eventing at the 1998 Asian Games
- Venue: Fort Adison Riding Club
- Date: 6–8 December 1998
- Competitors: 20 from 5 nations

Medalists
gold medal	Thailand; Fuangvich Aniruth-deva, Vithai Laithomya, Nagone Kamolsiri, Mana Sonkratok
silver medal	Japan; Keizo Eto, Sachiko Kodera, Shigeyuki Hosono, Ikko Murakami
bronze medal	India; Imtiaz Anees, Amlokjit Singh, Rajesh Pattu, Palwinder Singh

Team eventing equestrian at the 1998 Asian Games was held in Fort Adison Riding Club, Saraburi, Thailand from December 8 to December 10, 1998.

== Schedule ==
All times are Indochina Time (UTC+07:00)

Date	Time	Event
Tuesday, 8 December 1998	07:00	Dressage
Wednesday, 9 December 1998	08:00	Cross-country
Thursday, 10 December 1998	15:00	Jumping

== Results ==
Legend

- EL — Eliminated
- RT — Retired
- WD — Withdrawn

Rank	Team	Penalties			Total
Rank	Team	Dressage	X-country	Jumping	Total
1st place, gold medalist(s)	Thailand (THA)	171.40	0.00	20.00	191.40
	Fuangvich Aniruth-deva on Venetian Waltz	58.20	0.00	10.00	68.20
	Vithai Laithomya on Montana	58.60	0.00	10.00	68.60
	Nagone Kamolsiri on Chor Chuthima	54.60	0.00	0.00	54.60
	Mana Sonkratok on Jarungsap	~~100.80~~	~~2.75~~	~~12.75~~	~~116.30~~
2nd place, silver medalist(s)	Japan (JPN)	194.80	0.00	5.00	199.80
	Keizo Eto on Gipsy Joe	72.00	0.00	5.00	77.00
	Sachiko Kodera on Stars de Riols	69.40	0.00	0.00	69.40
	Shigeyuki Hosono on As du Perche	~~51.80~~	~~WD~~		~~1000.00~~
	Ikko Murakami on Onward Caesar	53.40	0.00	0.00	53.40
3rd place, bronze medalist(s)	India (IND)	235.20	923.60	45.00	1203.80
	Imtiaz Anees on Mirza	82.40	0.00	20.00	102.40
	Amlokjit Singh on Smart	76.40	0.00	25.00	101.40
	Rajesh Pattu on Ringo	~~88.20~~	~~RT~~		~~1000.00~~
	Palwinder Singh on Nector	76.40	EL		1000.00
4	Malaysia (MAS)	267.80	937.40	15.00	1220.20
	Tunku Nazroff on Sprite	80.40	0.00	5.00	85.40
	Husref Malek on McPherson	124.80	0.00	10.00	134.80
	Ashraff Denal Ali on Deutsche Mark	~~81.80~~	~~WD~~		~~1000.00~~
	James Ravindra on Alf	62.60	EL		1000.00
5	South Korea (KOR)	504.00	926.80	5.00	1435.80
	Choi Myung-jin on Cool Spirit	~~79.40~~	~~EL~~		~~1000.00~~
	Kim Hyung-chil on Hello Henry	366.00	0.00	0.00	366.00
	Park Jae-hong on Buddy Good	64.80	0.00	5.00	69.80
	Yang Hi-won on It's Hollywood	73.20	EL		1000.00
