= Equestrian at the 2006 Asian Games – Team eventing =

Team eventing at the 2006 Asian Games
- Venue: Doha Racing & Equestrian Club
- Date: 6–8 December 2006
- Competitors: 27 from 7 nations

Medalists
gold medal	Qatar; Awad Al-Qahtani, Rashid Al-Marri, Ali Al-Marri, Abdulla Al-Ejail
silver medal	Japan; Ikko Murakami, Shigeyuki Hosono, Yoshiaki Oiwa, Daisuke Kato
bronze medal	India; Bhagirath Singh, Deep Kumar Ahlawat, Palwinder Singh, Rajesh Pattu

Team eventing equestrian at the 2006 Asian Games was held in Doha Equestrian Arena, Doha, Qatar from December 6 to December 8, 2006.

South Korean equestrian athlete Kim Hyung-chil died after falling off his horse on the morning of December 7 during the cross country competition which took place in the rain. The accident occurred at jump number eight during the cross-country stage. After the horse, named Bundaberg Black, rolled over him, he was taken to the hospital, with his death later confirmed by the organizing committee.

== Schedule ==
All times are Arabia Standard Time (UTC+03:00)

Date	Time	Event
Wednesday, 6 December 2006	09:00	Dressage
Thursday, 7 December 2006	09:00	Cross-country
Friday, 8 December 2006	09:00	Jumping

== Results ==
Legend

- EL — Eliminated
- RT — Retired
- WD — Withdrawn

Rank	Team	Penalties			Total
Rank	Team	Dressage	X-country	Jumping	Total
1st place, gold medalist(s)	Qatar (QAT)	162.70	3.60	16.00	182.30
	Awad Al-Qahtani on Langata Son	59.80	3.60	6.00	69.40
	Rashid Al-Marri on Bonny C	56.20	0.00	10.00	66.20
	Ali Al-Marri on Reality Z	~~53.30~~	~~0.80~~	~~37.00~~	~~91.10~~
	Abdulla Al-Ejail on Quinten	46.70	0.00	0.00	46.70
2nd place, silver medalist(s)	Japan (JPN)	150.70	16.40	37.00	204.10
	Ikko Murakami on Intoransit	59.50	5.20	13.00	77.70
	Shigeyuki Hosono on Ipeca	50.70	11.20	20.00	81.90
	Yoshiaki Oiwa on Khanjer Black	40.50	0.00	4.00	44.50
	Daisuke Kato on Homme du Gue	~~53.30~~	~~114.00~~	~~8.00~~	~~175.30~~
3rd place, bronze medalist(s)	India (IND)	170.90	42.00	32.00	244.90
	Bhagirath Singh on Guddu	58.80	2.40	0.00	61.20
	Deep Kumar Ahlawat on Tipu	60.70	33.20	28.00	121.90
	Palwinder Singh on Naksh	~~60.00~~	~~EL~~		~~1000.00~~
	Rajesh Pattu on Shahzada	51.40	6.40	4.00	61.80
4	Indonesia (INA)	175.40	44.80	26.00	246.20
	Asep Lesmana on Aswatama Nottage H.	70.20	17.20	18.00	105.40
	Dikie Mardiyanto on Aswatama R-Jay	54.50	7.60	8.00	70.10
	Endarjanto Bambang on Aswatama Frankie Jay	50.70	20.00	0.00	70.70
	Andry Prasetyono on Aswatama Sportzgirl	~~56.40~~	~~25.00~~	~~EL~~	~~1000.00~~
5	United Arab Emirates (UAE)	203.40	30.80	16.00	250.20
	Saif Omar Thabet on Mexico de Poncenat	61.70	4.00	8.00	73.70
	Abdullah Al-Shuaibi on Marius d'Argouges	~~77.60~~	~~2.80~~	~~26.00~~	~~106.40~~
	Abdulrahman Al-Habsi on Marquis de Dun	68.60	26.80	8.00	103.40
	Rashid Al-Hosani on Jerico des Bejuy	73.10	0.00	0.00	73.10
6	Malaysia (MAS)	183.10	108.80	16.00	307.90
	Johari Lee on Star Portrait	61.70	0.00	0.00	61.70
	Amir Zulkefle on Aachen	68.10	108.80	12.00	188.90
	Husref Malek on Dashper	53.30	0.00	4.00	57.30
—	South Korea (KOR)	196.40	WD		WD
	Heo Jun-sung on Foxdale Wild Card	~~67.40~~	~~7.60~~		~~WD~~
	Kim Hyung-chil on Bundaberg Black	66.40	RT		RT
	Sohn Bong-gak on Wondaree Time's Right	65.70	WD		WD
	Cheon Jai-sik on Hat Trick	64.30	WD		WD
