= Equestrian at the 2002 Asian Games – Team dressage =

Team dressage at the 2002 Asian Games
- Venue: Busan Equestrian Grounds
- Date: 8 October 2002
- Competitors: 19 from 5 nations

Medalists
gold medal	South Korea; Choi Jun-sang, Suh Jung-kyun, Shin Chang-moo, Kim Jung-keun
silver medal	Japan; Hiroyuki Kitahara, Naoki Hitomi, Masumi Yokokawa, Yuriko Miyoshi
bronze medal	China; Huang Zhuoqin, Zhang Lijun, Gu Bing

Team dressage equestrian at the 2002 Asian Games was held in Busan Equestrian Grounds, Busan, South Korea on October 8, 2002.

== Schedule ==
All times are Korea Standard Time (UTC+09:00)

Date	Time	Event
Tuesday, 8 October 2002	09:00	Final

== Results ==
Rank	Team	% score
1st place, gold medalist(s)	South Korea (KOR)	66.533
	Choi Jun-sang on Dancing Boy	69.771
	Suh Jung-kyun on Anycall	65.143
	Shin Chang-moo on Regal	64.686
	Kim Jung-keun on Tengo	~~59.657~~
2nd place, silver medalist(s)	Japan (JPN)	65.352
	Hiroyuki Kitahara on Usagi Yojinbo	66.457
	Naoki Hitomi on Sion's Boy	66.171
	Masumi Yokokawa on Movie Star	63.429
	Yuriko Miyoshi on Why Me	~~62.171~~
3rd place, bronze medalist(s)	China (CHN)	59.276
	Huang Zhuoqin on Xifang Shenshi	60.286
	Zhang Lijun on Nureyer	58.914
	Gu Bing on Helan Erhao	58.629
4	Thailand (THA)	59.067
	Atchakorn Phromyothi on Deauville	62.057
	Chaleamchan Chamnankitch on Mr. Wong	58.114
	Chanya Srifuengfung on Hexagano	57.029
	Suwat Bunlue on Ferdinant	~~54.914~~
5	India (IND)	54.267
	Sunil Shiv Das on Rampage	56.857
	Sandeep Dewan on Tamara	53.714
	Mritunjay Rathore on Tusker	52.229
	Vishal Bishnoi on Tanala	~~48.743~~
