= Larasati Gading =

Indonesian equestrian

Personal information
- Full name: Larasati Iris Rischka Gading
- Nickname: Laras
- Born: November 14, 1971 (age 54) Stuttgart, West Germany

Sport
- Country: Indonesia
- Sport: Equestrian
- Club: Gading Equestrian Team
Medal record
Equestrian
Representing Indonesia
Asian Games
Bronze medal – third place	2014 Incheon	Individual dressage
Asian Championships
Silver medal – second place	2019 Pattaya	Individual dressage
Bronze medal – third place	2019 Pattaya	Team dressage
SEA Games
Gold medal – first place	2011 Jakarta–Palembang	Individual dressage
Gold medal – first place	2011 Jakarta–Palembang	Team dressage
Gold medal – first place	2015 Singapore	Individual dressage
Gold medal – first place	2015 Singapore	Team dressage
Silver medal – second place	2007 Nakhon Ratchasima	Team dressage
Bronze medal – third place	2001 Kuala Lumpur	Team dressage

Larasati Iris Rischka Gading (born 14 November 1971 in Stuttgart) is an Indonesian equestrian athlete. Gading represented Indonesia on international competitions since 2001. She won individual bronze at the Asian Games in 2014 and won double gold during the SEA-Games in 2011 and 2015. She is the most successful dressage rider for Indonesia in history and is also coach and judge in Eventing and Dressage on international level. Before starting her career as professional equestrian athlete at the age of 27, Gading was an international model and brand ambassador for an Indonesian cosmetic brand.

In 2018, Gading married the German businessman and entrepreneur Andy Todzi. She is fluent in English, German, Indonesian, French, Dutch and Italian.

== Magazine Cover ==
- Femina Magazine, 26 June-2 July 1997, 27 November-3 December 1997, 15–21 March 2001, 7–13 March 2002
- Matra Magazine, #101, December 1994.

== Trivia ==
- Larasati Gading was chosen as the Brand Ambassador Sariayu from year 1995 to 1999
