= Janette Bouman =

Dutch-born Kazakhstani dressage rider

Personal information
- Born: June 17, 1964 (age 62) Veendam, Netherlands

Janette Bouman (born 17 June 1964 in Veendam, Netherlands) is a Dutch-born Kazakhstani dressage rider. She represented Kazakhstan at the 2014 World Equestrian Games in Normandy where she finished 52nd in the individual dressage with her horse v.Power.

She also competed for Kazakhstan at the 2014 Asian Games where she finished 9th individually and 8th with the Kazakh team in team dressage competition.
