= Masaru Fuse =

Japanese equestrian (born 1969)

Personal information
- Nationality: Japanese
- Born: 14 October 1969 (age 57) Hokkaido, Japan

Sport
- Sport: Equestrian
Medal record
Equestrian
Representing Japan
Asian Games
Gold medal – first place	2002 Busan	Team eventing

Masaru Fuse (布施 勝, Fuse Masaru; born 14 October 1969) is a Japanese equestrian. He competed at the 1996 Summer Olympics and the 2000 Summer Olympics.
