= Masanao Takahashi =

Japanese equestrian

Personal information
- Born: January 18, 1982 (age 44)
Medal record
Equestrian
Representing Japan
Asian Games
Gold medal – first place	2018 Jakarta	Team dressage
Bronze medal – third place	2006 Doha	Team dressage

Masanao Takahashi (高橋 正直, Takahashi Masanao; born 18 January 1982) is a Japanese Olympic dressage rider. Representing Japan, he competed at the 2016 Summer Olympics in Rio de Janeiro where he finished 58th in the individual and 11th in the team competitions.

Takahashi also competed at the 2006 Asian Games, where he won a bronze medal in team dressage.
