= Pongsiree Bunluewong =

Thai equestrian (born 1984)

Personal information
- Native name: พงศ์สิรี บรรลือวงศ์
- Nickname: Pukai (ปูไข่)
- Nationality: Thai
- Born: 9 November 1984 (age 41) Bangkok Thailand
- Education: Assumption University
- Occupation: Actor
- Years active: 1994–2023
- Spouse: Chompoonuch Piyatumchai (m. 2024)

Sport
- Sport: Equestrian
Medal record
Equestrian
Representing Thailand
Asian Games
Gold medal – first place	2002 Busan	Individual eventing

Pongsiree Bunluewong (Thai: พงศ์สิรี บรรลือวงศ์; born 9 November 1984) is a Thai equestrian and actor. He competed in the individual eventing at the 2004 Summer Olympics.

== Personal life ==
Pukhai is in a relationship with Chompunuch, a former Channel 7 actress, After dating for over 11 years. On November 9, 2024, the couple officially entered the wedding gate. The wedding ceremony was held according to Christian traditions at St. Louis Marie de Montfort Church at Assumption University. Among close friends and family who came to witness.

== Filmography ==
=== Television drama ===
Year	Title	Role
1994	Fah Pieng Din	Guest Role
2003	Nah Tang See Chompoo Pra Too See Fah	Pentor
2005	Proong Nee Mai Sai Tee Ja Ruk Kan	Toey
2007	Pu Kong Jao Sanae	Guest Role
2007	Ubattihet Hua Jai	Pipat
2007	Hua Jai Sila	Thanwa
2009	Ching Chang	Ahtit
2010	Malai Sarm Chai	Suk
2011	Nang Sao Jumlaeng Ruk	Mungla
2011	Kohn Teun	Wong
2012	Likit Fah Cha Ta Din	Ching Chai
2012	Look Phi Look Nong	Oh
2012	Sao Noi	Neua
2012	Jao Mae Jum Pen	Chuwat
2013	Koo Gum	Police Inspector Rongat
2013	Sud Sai Pan	Praphan
2014	Anintita	Chai Wiriya
2015	The Last Memory	Support Role
2015	Dok Mai Lai Pad Klon	Support Role
2015	In Darkness	Kanon Sakkara
2016	Fatal Destiny	Chat
2017	Chaloei Seuk	Mangjalay
2017	Nark Boon Song Klot	Suerbai
2018	Lep Krut	Nitat
2019	Majurat Holiday	Wiwat
2021	XYZ	Kris
2023	Justice in the Wild	Nop

=== Film ===
Year	Title	Role
2011	The Outrage	Police Inspector
2013	Jan Dara: The Finale	Capt. Danai
2014	The Scar (2014 film)	Joi
2015	Love You 100K	Joet

== Royal decoration ==
2002 - Gold Medalist (Sixth Class) of The Most Admirable Order of the Direkgunabhorn
