= Ryuzo Kitajima =

Japanese equestrian (born 1985)

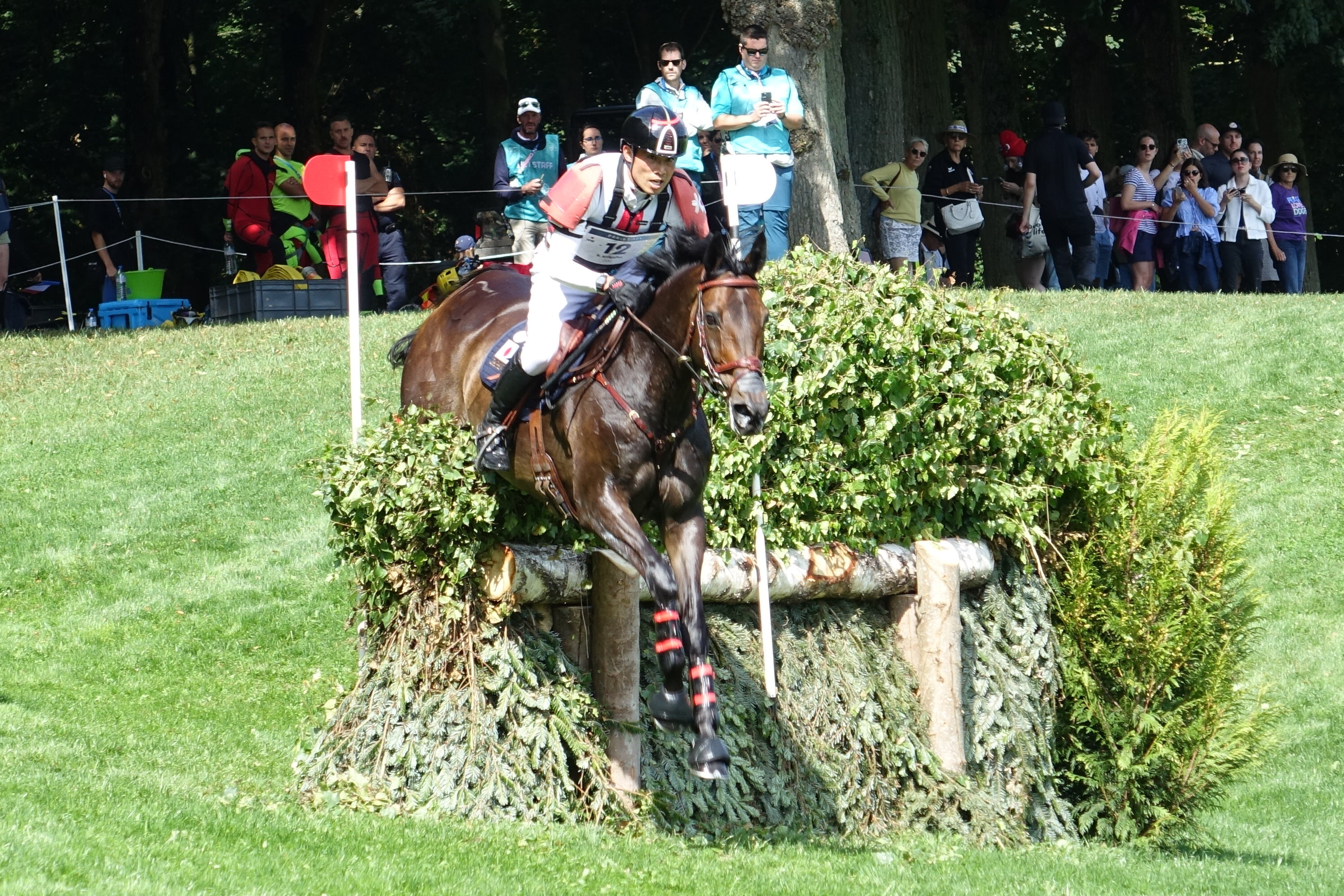
- Kitajima at the 2024 Summer Olympics

Personal information
- Born: 23 October 1985 (age 40) Kobe, Japan
Medal record
Equestrian
Representing Japan
Olympic Games
Bronze medal – third place	2024 Paris	Team eventing
Asian Games
Gold medal – first place	2018 Jakarta-Palembang	Team eventing
Silver medal – second place	2014 Incheon	Team eventing

Ryuzo Kitajima (北島 隆三, Kitajima Ryūzō; born 23 October 1985) is a Japanese Olympic eventing rider. He participated at the 2016 Summer Olympics in Rio de Janeiro where he withdrew during the individual competition. He participated at the 2024 Summer Olympics on Cekatinka. After Cekatina was held at the vet inspection on show jumping day, Kitajima withdrew from the competition.

Kitajima also competed at the 2014 Asian Games. He won a silver medal in the team eventing and placed 6th individually.
