= Hiroyuki Kitahara =

Japanese equestrian

Personal information
- Full name: Hiroyuki Kitahara
- Born: Sep 13, 1971 (age 54) Tokyo, Japan

Sport
- Country: Japan
- Sport: Equestrian
- Club: Japan Racing Association

Achievements and titles
- World finals: 2010 World Equestrian Games
Medal record
Equestrian
Representing Japan
Asian Games
Silver medal – second place	2002 Busan	Team dressage

Hiroyuki Kitahara (北原広之, born 13 September 1971) is a Japanese dressage rider. He represented Japan at the 2010 World Equestrian Games and won team silver at the 2002 Asian Games in Busan. In 2019 he set a new record by winning a CDI in Europe as the first Japanese dressage rider.

Hiroyuki started riding at the age of eight at the Japan Racing Association's club in Tokyo, while joining the Japanese youth team. In his riding career he worked several times in Germany from 1999 to 2001 and from 2007 to 2008. In 2018 he returned to Germany to prepare for the 2020 Olympic Games to train with Finnish team rider Henri Ruoste.

Kitahara was part of the Japanese dressage team during the 2020 Summer Olympics in his city of birth Tokyo. He competed with his horse Huracan in the Grand Prix and finished 45th in the individual competition.
