= Kazuki Sado =

Japanese equestrian (born 1985)

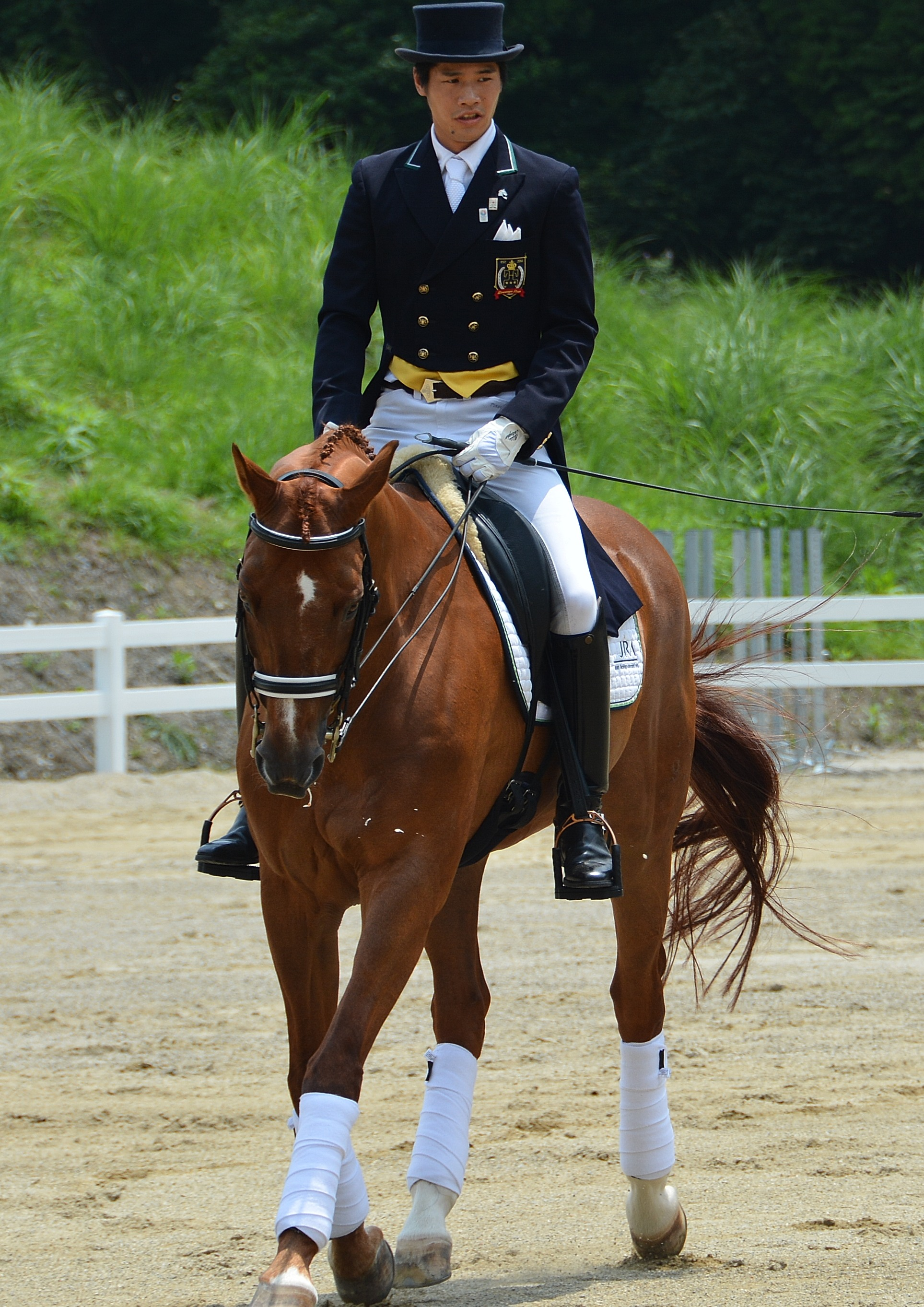
- Kazuki Sado in 2014

Personal information
- Born: Kazuki Sado; Feb 20, 1985 (age 41) Kyoto, Japan

Sport
- Country: Japan
- Sport: Equestrian
- Coached by: Imke Schellekens-Bartels

Achievements and titles
- World finals: 2018 FEI World Equestrian Games
Medal record
Equestrian
Representing Japan
Asian Games
Gold medal – first place	2018 Jakarta	Team dressage
Silver medal – second place	2014 Incheon	Team dressage

Kazuki Sado (佐渡一毅, born 20 February 1985) is a Japanese dressage rider. He competed at the 2018 World Equestrian Games, at the Asian Games in 2014 and 2018. He won team gold during the Asian Games in 2018 and team silver during the Asian Games in 2014. He trained in the Netherlands with former Olympian Imke Schellekens-Bartels in preparation towards the 2020 Olympic Games. He participated in the 2020 Olympics.
