= Toshiyuki Tanaka =

Japanese equestrian

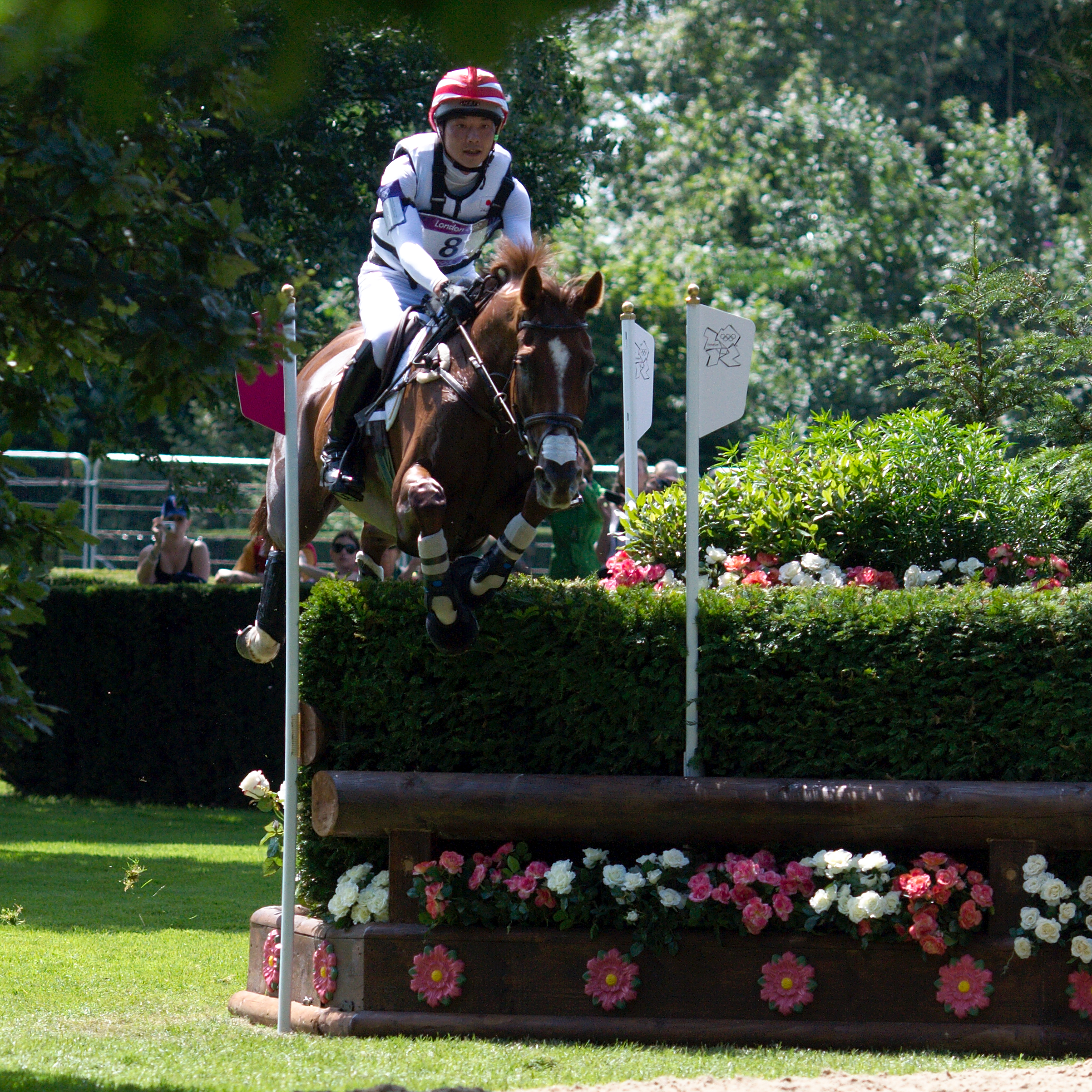
- Tanaka and Marquis De Plescop competing at the 2012 Summer Olympics in London

Personal information
- Nationality: Japanese
- Born: 2 February 1985 (age 41) Fukuoka, Japan

Sport
- Sport: Equestrian
Medal record
Equestrian
Representing Japan
Olympic Games
| Bronze medal – third place | 2024 Paris | Team eventing |

Toshiyuki Tanaka (田中 利幸, Tanaka Toshiyuki; born 2 February 1985) is a Japanese equestrian. He competed in eventing at the 2012 Summer Olympics and the 2020 Summer Olympics.

Tanaka was the travelling reserve for the 2024 Summer Olympics. When team member Ryuzo Kitajima withdrew his horse Cekatinka from the horse inspection on show jumping day, Tanaka rode for the Japanese team in the show jumping phase of the competition.
