= Indrajit Lamba =

Indian equestrian

Personal information
- Nationality: Indian
- Born: 7 October 1949 (age 76)

Sport
- Sport: Equestrian

Indrajit Lamba (born 7 October 1949) is an Indian equestrian. He competed in the individual eventing at the 1996 Summer Olympics. He also won a Bronze in the individual eventing in the 2002 Asian Games.
