= Huang Zhuoqin =

Chinese equestrian

Personal information
- Born: 18 July 1978 (age 47) Gujing Town, Xinhui District, People's Republic of China

Sport
- Country: China
- Sport: Equestrian

Achievements and titles
- Regional finals: 2002 Asian Games, 2010 Asian Games, 2014 Asian Games, 2022 Asian Games
Medal record
Equestrian
Representing China
Asian Games
Silver medal – second place	2022 Hangzhou	Team dressage
Silver medal – second place	2010 Guangzhou	Team dressage
Bronze medal – third place	2002 Busan	Team dressage

Huang Zhuoqin (Chinese: 黄焯钦, born 18 July 1978 in Xinhui) is an equestrian athlete competing for China. He competed at five Asian Games, and was part of the Chinese team that won bronze at the 2002 Asian Games and silver at the 2010 Asian Games and at the 2022 Asian Games.
