= Alex Hua Tian =

Chinese equestrian (born 1989)

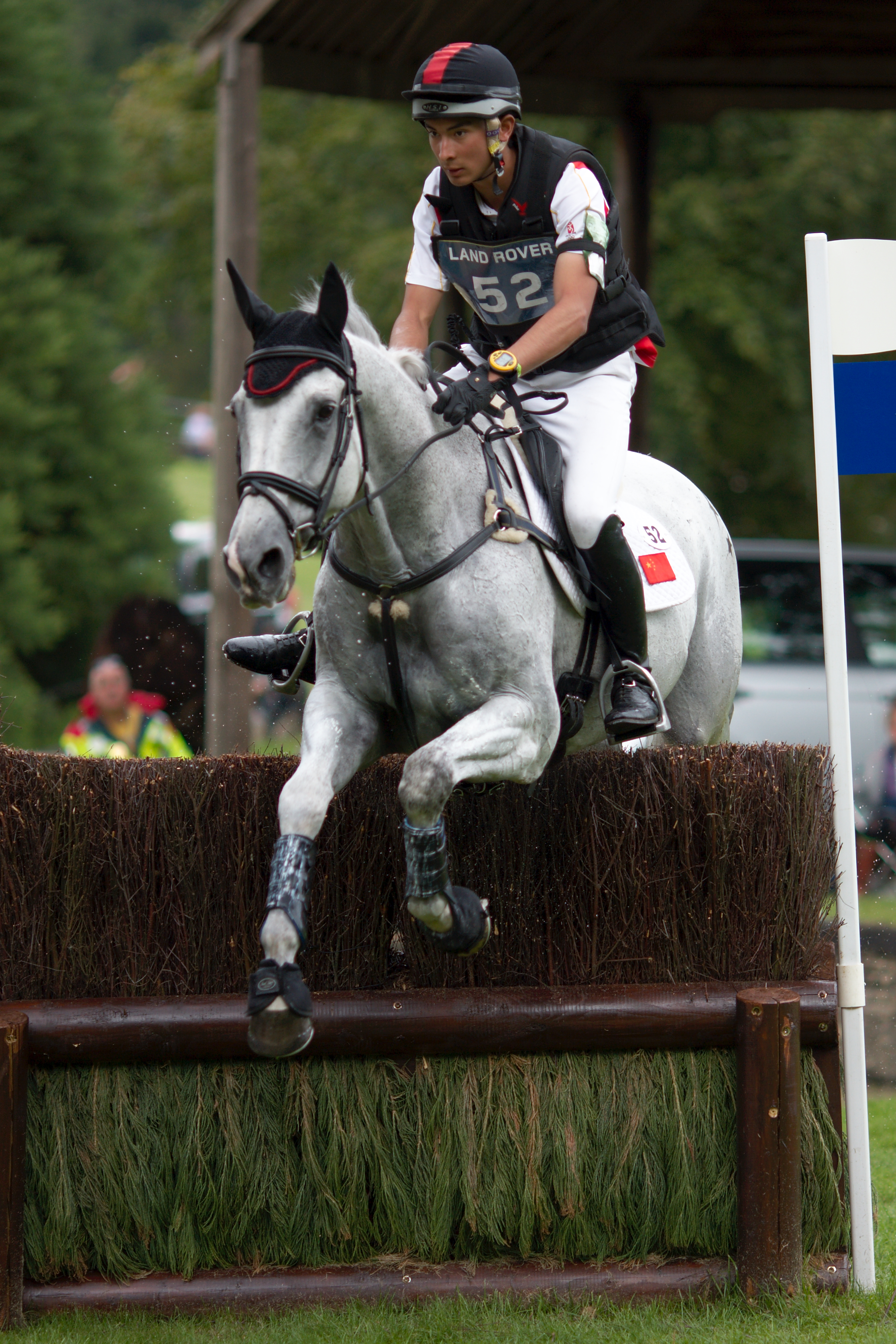
- Alex Hua Tian and ESB Irish Fiddle at the Trout Hatchery during the cross-country phase of Burghley Horse Trials 2010.

Personal information
- Nationality: China
- Discipline: Eventing
- Born: 25 October 1989 (age 36); London
Medal record
Asian Games
Gold medal – first place	2022 Hangzhou	Individual eventing
Gold medal – first place	2022 Hangzhou	Team eventing
Silver medal – second place	2014 Incheon	Individual eventing
Bronze medal – third place	2018 Jakarta-Palembang	Individual eventing

Alex Hua Tian (simplified Chinese: 华天; traditional Chinese: 華天; pinyin: Huà Tiān; Jyutping: Waa^{4} Tin^{1}; born 25 October 1989) is an equestrian sportsman who competes in eventing for China.

== Early life ==
Hua was born in London to a Chinese father and a British mother. He has a brother, called Jamie Hua Ming. The family lived in Beijing, before moving to Hong Kong. Hua started riding aged four. His family moved to Wiltshire when he was 11, where Hua attended Chafyn Grove School followed by Eton College.

== Career ==
Hua was the only Chinese event rider competing internationally between 2006 and 2016 and the first Chinese to be registered with International Federation for Equestrian Sports. He took a year out of his studies at Eton to prepare for the 2008 Olympics in Beijing. He qualified four horses between October 2007 and May 2008. Although as a host nation competitor he only needed to achieve a minimum standard, he qualified in his own right through the rankings as the youngest ever Olympic event rider. In mid-2008 he achieved a ranking of 21st in the world. The equestrian industry in China has grown since the 2008 Olympics in Beijing to be the 3rd largest leisure pursuit among the elite in China.

He was coached by the former world champion Clayton Fredericks and his wife Lucinda Fredericks, who won the Burghley Horse Trials 2006 and Badminton Horse Trials 2007, at their base in Wiltshire, and by Jane Gregory, British Olympic Dressage Team 1996 and 2008.

Having returned to Eton to complete his studies, Hua won a place at Bristol University to study Aerotechnology Engineering, which he postponed for three years to concentrate on working toward competing in London 2012. At the 2009, Blenheim International Horse Trials, Hua won the Best under-25 Prize and qualified for the World Equestrian Games in Lexington, September 2010. In November 2009, he won the inaugural HSBC Rising Star Award, presented to him in Copenhagen by Princess Haya, President of the International Equestrian Federation at the 'Oscars of Equestrian Sport'.

In 2014, Hua won a silver medal at the Incheon Asian Games riding Temujin, owned by Edwina Qu Ye.

Hua qualified for the 2016 Summer Olympics in Rio with horses Harbour Pilot C and Don Geniro. He placed 8th with Don Geniro.

In 2018 he won a bronze medal at the Jakarta Asian Games riding PSH Convivial.

In 2019 he was a member of the first Chinese eventing team to qualify for the 2020 Summer Olympics.

In 2023, Hua's horse Chicko was found to have altrenogest in his system after a controlled drug test. An independent investigation found the horse's ingestion of the substance to be accidental, however, the positive test cost China their team spot at the 2024 Summer Olympic games in Paris.

In 2024 he won team and individual gold in the Asian Games in Hangzhou. He qualified for Paris Olympics as an individual. Lying in bronze position after dressage, he was impeded by a judge during the cross country phase causing a controversial penalty. Hua completed the competition in 25th place.

== See also ==
- China at the 2008 Summer Olympics
