= Sergey Buikevich =

Kazakhstani dressage and endurance rider

Personal information
- Born: August 13, 1963 (age 62)

Sport
- Country: Kazakhstan, Kyrgyzstan
- Sport: Equestrian dressage

Sergey Mikhailovich Buikevich (Russian: Сергей Михайлович Буйкевич; born 13 August 1963) is a Kazakhstani dressage and endurance rider. He represented Kazakhstan at two World Equestrian Games in individual dressage competitions. At the 2006 World Equestrian Games in Aachen he rode Volan and was eliminated during the Grand Prix test. At his second Games in 2014 he finished 95th individually with Ispovednik.

He also competed for Kazakhstan at two Asian Games. Now he changed his sports nationality to Kyrgyzstan.
