= Choi Jun-sang =

South Korean equestrian

Personal information
- Nationality: South Korean
- Born: 24 July 1978 (age 47) Seoul, South Korea

Sport
- Sport: Equestrian
Medal record
Equestrian
Representing South Korea
Asian Games
Gold medal – first place	2002 Busan	Individual dressage
Gold medal – first place	2002 Busan	Team dressage
Gold medal – first place	2006 Doha	Individual dressage
Gold medal – first place	2006 Doha	Team dressage
Gold medal – first place	2010 Guangzhou	Team dressage

Choi Jun-sang (Korean: 최준상, born 24 July 1978) is a South Korean equestrian. He competed in the individual dressage event at the 2008 Summer Olympics.
