= Shigeyuki Hosono =

Japanese equestrian (born 1968)

Personal information
- Nationality: Japanese
- Born: 17 September 1968 (age 57) Hokkaido, Japan

Sport
- Sport: Equestrian
Medal record
Equestrian
Representing Japan
Asian Games
Gold medal – first place	2002 Busan	Team eventing
Silver medal – second place	1998 Bangkok	Team eventing
Silver medal – second place	2006 Doha	Team eventing

Shigeyuki Hosono (born 17 September 1968) is a Japanese equestrian. He competed at the 1996 Summer Olympics and the 2000 Summer Olympics.
