= Daisuke Kato (equestrian) =

Japanese equestrian

Personal information
- Nationality: Japanese
- Born: 22 December 1965 (age 60)

Sport
- Sport: Equestrian
Medal record
Equestrian
Representing Japan
Asian Games
Gold medal – first place	2002 Busan	Team eventing
Bronze medal – third place	2002 Busan	Individual eventing

Daisuke Kato (born 22 December 1965) is a Japanese equestrian. He competed in two events at the 2000 Summer Olympics.
