= Jacqueline Siu =

Hong Kong equestrian

Jacqueline Wing Ying Siu MH
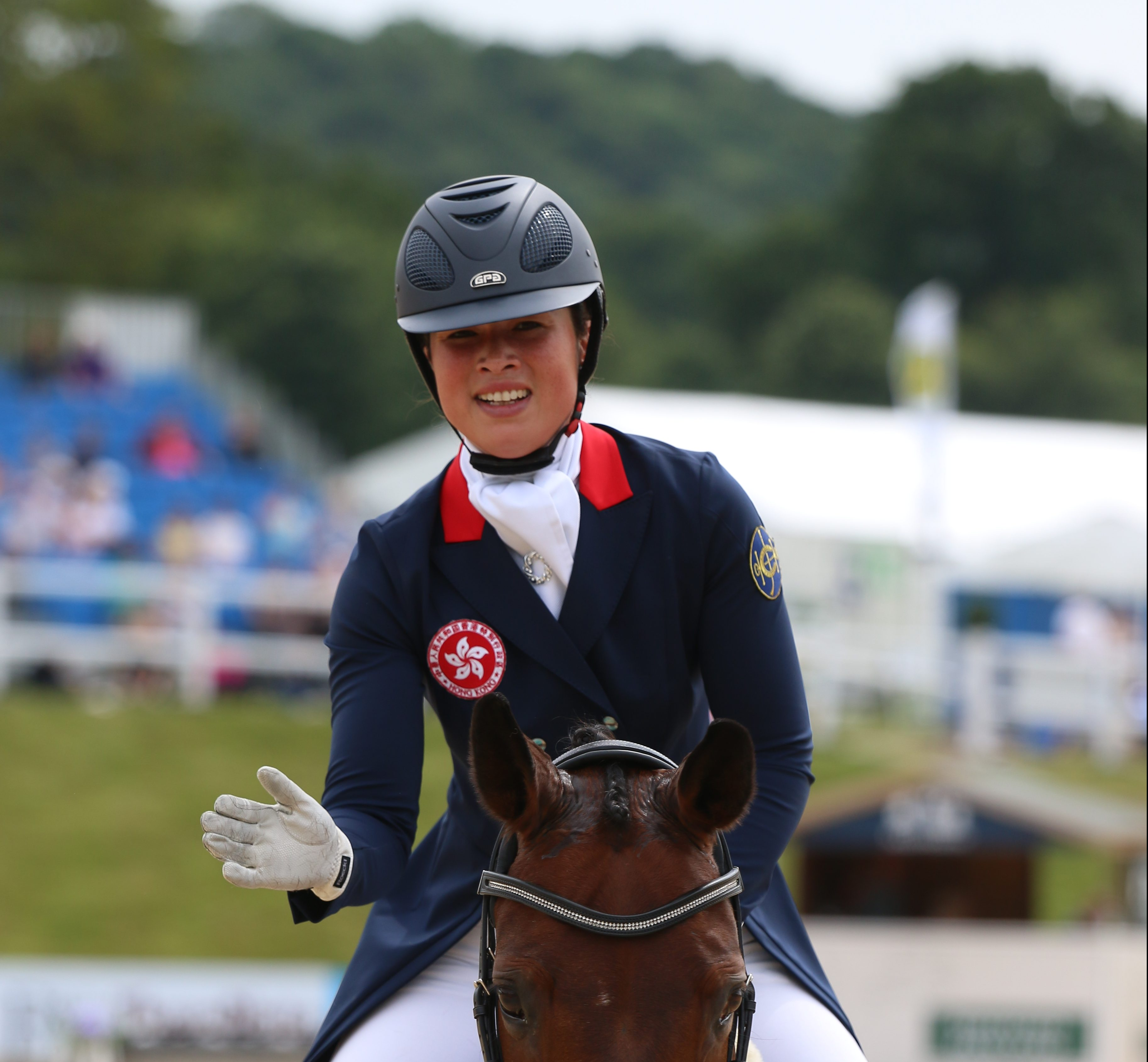

Personal information
- Full name: Jacqueline Wing Ying Siu
- Nickname: Jackie
- Nationality: Hong Konger
- Born: 8 December 1982 (age 43) Hong Kong
- Website: http://www.jackie-siu.com/

Sport
- Country: Hong Kong
- Sport: Equestrian
- Club: Hong Kong Jockey Club
- Coached by: Carl Hester

Achievements and titles
- World finals: 2018 World Equestrian Games
Medal record
Equestrian
Representing Hong Kong
Asian Games
Gold medal – first place	2018 Jakarta	Individual dressage
Silver medal – second place	2022 Hangzhou	Individual dressage
Bronze medal – third place	2022 Hangzhou	Team dressage

Jacqueline Wing Ying Siu MH (born 8 December 1982 in Hong Kong) is a dressage rider from Hong Kong. She became the first equestrian athlete from Hong Kong who won a gold medal during the 2018 Asian Games in Jakarta.

== Biography ==
Jacqueline Siu was born in Hong Kong, where she started riding at the age of five at the Beas River Hong Kong Jockey Club. At the age of 10, she moved to the United Kingdom with her family. In England, she continued her riding career at pony, junior and young rider level where she internationally competes for Great Britain, including European youth championships. In 2005 she decided to compete under the Hong Kong flag. Jackie began competing on senior level and moved to The Netherlands to train with triple Olympic champion Anky van Grunsven.

Jackie competed at five Asian Games in Doha 2006, Guangzhou 2010, Incheon 2014, 2018 Asian Games in Jakarta, Indonesia and Hangzhou 2022. In 2018 she also competed at the World Equestrian Games in Tryon.

She is currently running her own stable Pebbly Hill Stud in Cotswold, England.

== Horses ==
- Ferrera - 2003 Bay Oldenburger mare (Sandro Hit x Donnerhall)
- Jockey Club Furst on Tour - 2005 Darkbay Rheinlander gelding (Furst Henrich x Rubioso)
- Jockey Club Connery - 2001 Bay Danish Warmblood stallion (Come Back II x Port Royal)

== Awards ==
Jacqueline Siu is awarded a Medal of Honour at the 2019 Hong Kong Awards Ceremony.
