= Qabil Ambak =

Malaysian equestrian (born 1980)

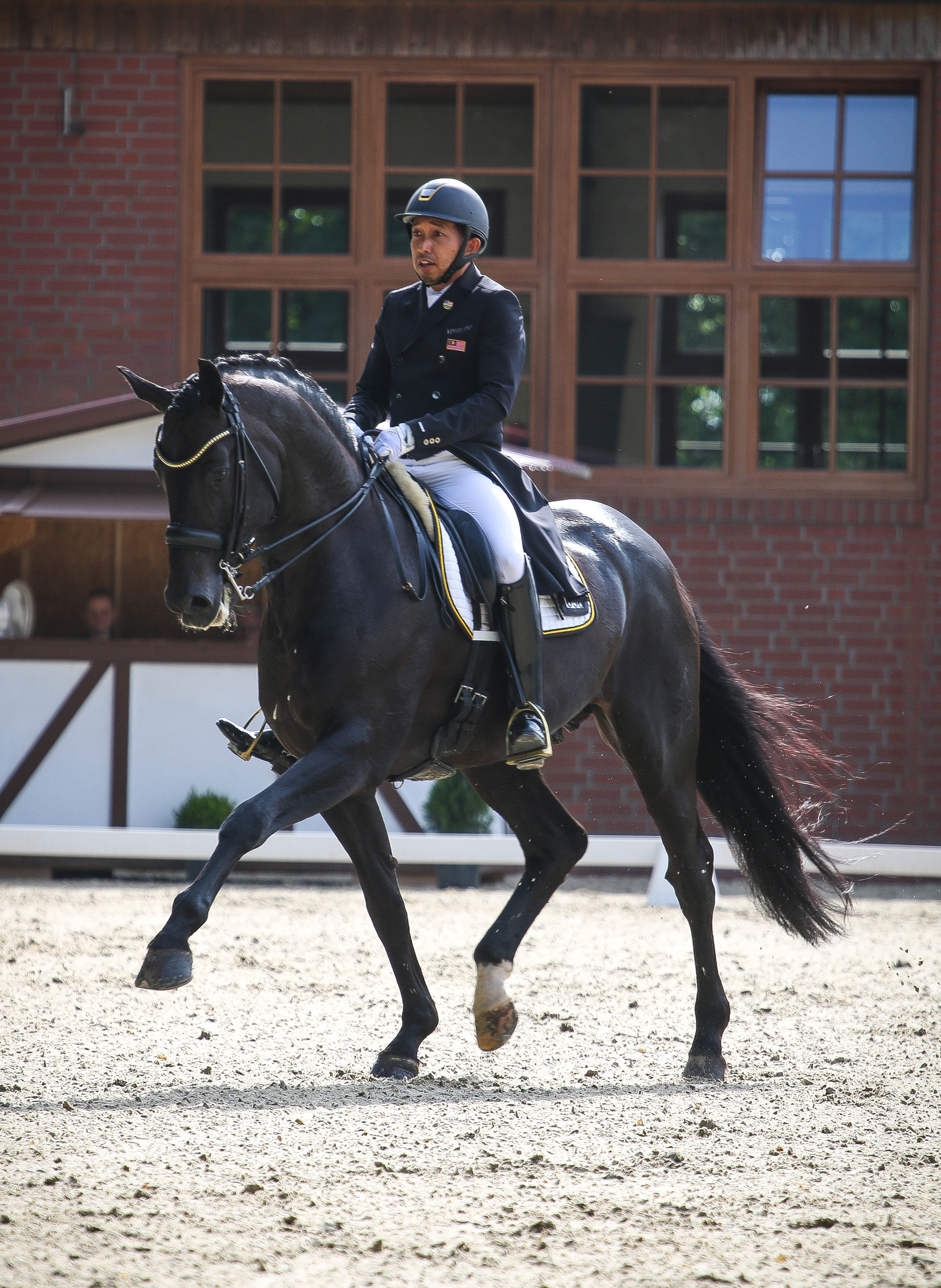
- Qabil Ambak competing Delatio at 2019 CDI Cappeln

Personal information
- Full name: Dato’ Qabil Ambak Tan Sri Mahamad Fathil
- Nickname: Qabs
- Born: 15 January 1980 (age 46) Kuala Lumpur, Malaysia
- Website: https://www.instagram.com/qabil.ambak?igsh=eTA4b3dhcGM2c3Fv&utm_source=qr

Sport
- Country: Malaysia
- Sport: Equestrian
- Club: https://www.facebook.com/share/1Do3ANqYTf/?mibextid=wwXIfr
- Coached by: Dennis Fisker (Dressage) and Lars Bak Andersen (Jumping)
Medal record
Equestrian
Representing Malaysia
Asian Games
Gold medal – first place	2022 Hangzhou	Individual dressage
Silver medal – second place	2018 Jakarta	Individual dressage
Silver medal – second place	2006 Doha	Team dressage
Silver medal – second place	1998 Bangkok	Team dressage
Bronze medal – third place	2010 Guangzhou	Individual dressage
Bronze medal – third place	2010 Guangzhou	Team dressage
Bronze medal – third place	2006 Doha	Individual dressage
Bronze medal – third place	2002 Busan	Team jumping
SEA Games
Gold medal – first place	2017 Kuala Lumpur	Team dressage
Gold medal – first place	2017 Kuala Lumpur	Team jumping
Gold medal – first place	2007 Korat	Team dressage
Gold medal – first place	2007 Korat	Team jumping
Gold medal – first place	2007 Korat	Individual dressage
Gold medal – first place	2007 Korat	Individual jumping
Gold medal – first place	2005 Manila	Individual jumping
Gold medal – first place	2001 Kuala Lumpur	Team dressage
Gold medal – first place	2001 Kuala Lumpur	Team jumping
Gold medal – first place	2001 Kuala Lumpur	Individual dressage
Gold medal – first place	2001 Kuala Lumpur	Individual jumping
Silver medal – second place	2017 Kuala Lumpur	Individual dressage
Silver medal – second place	2017 Kuala Lumpur	Individual jumping
Silver medal – second place	2005 Manila	Team jumping
Bronze medal – third place	1995 Chiang Mai	Team dressage

Dato’ Qabil Ambak Tan Sri Mahamad Fathil (born 15 January 1980 in Kuala Lumpur) is a Malaysian equestrian rider. He competed at six Asian Games and SEA Games in jumping and dressage and earned in total 23 medals. Ambak was qualified for the 2020 Olympic Games after New Zealand withdrew from their spot, but he did not obtained his MER qualification scores before the official deadline, which caused him to lose his Olympic starting place.

During the 2022 Asian Games in Hangzhou he wrote history by becoming the first Malaysian gold medalist in equestrian during the Asian Games.

== Biography ==
Qabil Ambak started riding at a young age but started competing in dressage in 1992 on a national level. In 1995 he started show-jumping.

== Personal life ==
He is married to his wife Jeana Ayla Goh and has three children Maiya Ambak, Rumi Ambak and Enzo Ambak. His brother Quzier Ambak and Quzandria Nur both compete in international jumping and dressage as well. He owns an equestrian facility 3Q Equestrian in Rawang, Selangor. Besides the equestrian he is a director at MFDM Holdings in Malaysia.
