= Hwang Young-shik =

South Korean equestrian (born 1990)

Personal information
- Born: November 13, 1990 (age 35) Osan, South Korea
- Height: 181 cm (5 ft 11 in) (2014)
- Weight: 80 kg (176 lb) (2014)

Sport
- Country: South Korea
- Sport: Equestrian
- Club: Semadae Riding Club

Achievements and titles
- Regional finals: 2010 Asian Games, 2014 Asian Games
Medal record
Equestrian
Representing South Korea
Asian Games
Gold medal – first place	2010 Guangzhou	Team dressage
Gold medal – first place	2010 Guangzhou	Individual dressage
Gold medal – first place	2014 Incheon	Team dressage
Gold medal – first place	2014 Incheon	Individual dressage

Hwang Young-shik (born 13 November 1990) is a South Korean equestrian athlete. During the 2010 Asian Games in Guangzhou he won individual gold and team gold in dressage representing South Korea. In 2014 during the 2014 Asian Games defended his title by winning again individual gold and team gold. In 2018 he decided not to focus on the Asian Games but moved to Germany to train and to qualify for the Olympic Games. The following year 2019 he obtained an individual team spot for the 2020 Olympic Games in Tokyo.
