= Shingo Hayashi =

Japanese dressage rider (born 1985)

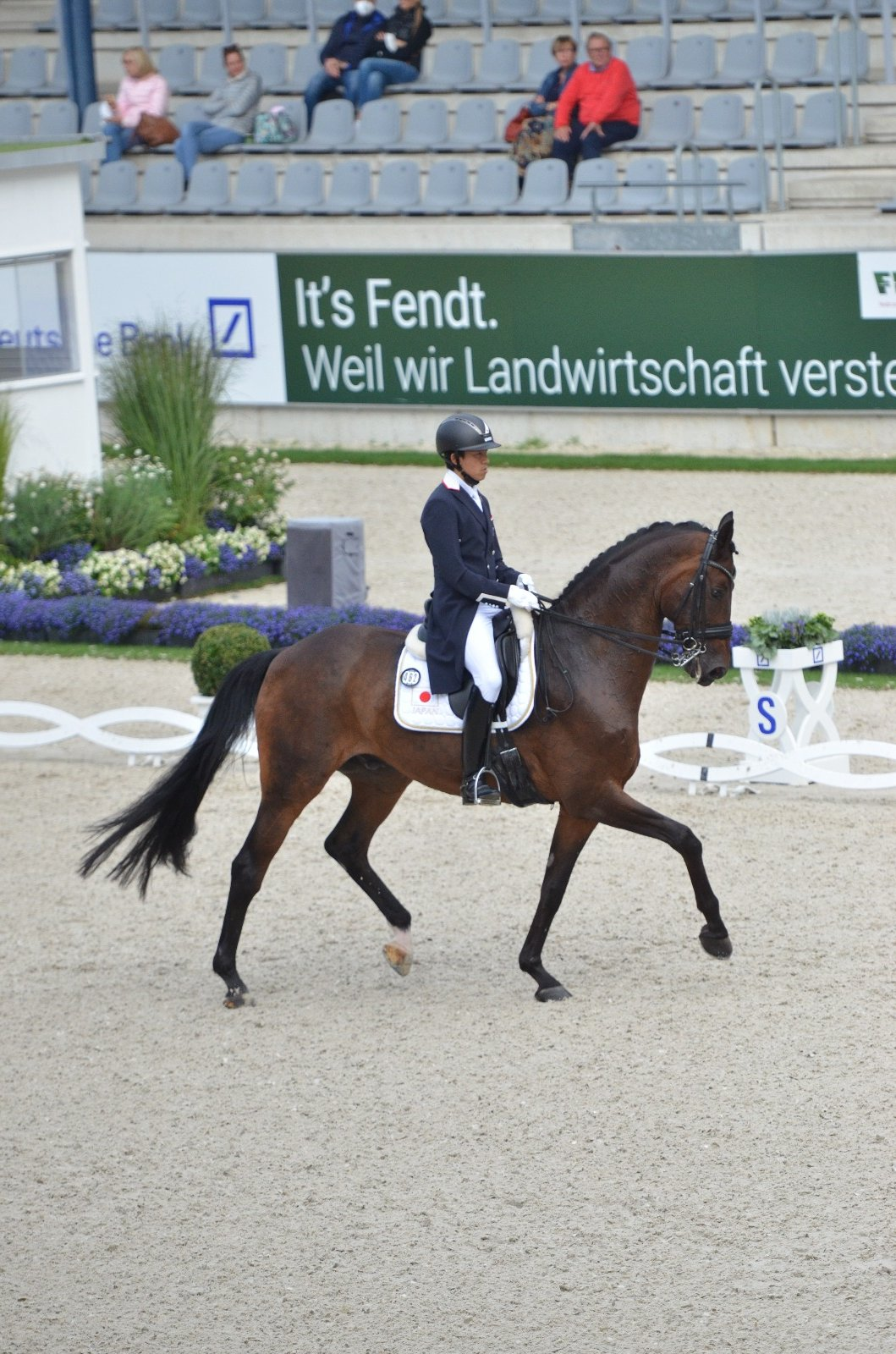
- Shingo Hayashi in 2020

Personal information
- Nationality: Japanese
- Born: January 25, 1985 (age 41) Sapporo, Japan

Sport
- Sport: Dressage

Achievements and titles
- World finals: 2018 FEI World Equestrian Games
Medal record
Equestrian
Representing Japan
Asian Games
Silver medal – second place	2014 Incheon	Team dressage
Bronze medal – third place	2026 Aichi–Nagoya	Team dressage

Shingo Hayashi (林 伸伍, born 25 January 1985) is a Japanese dressage rider. Shingo competed at the 2010 Asian Games in Hangzhou, China and at the 2014 Asian Games in Incheon, South Korea where he won team silver. He also competed at the 2018 FEI World Equestrian Games in Tryon, North Carolina, United States of America. He was the first team reserve for the Japanese dressage team during the 2016 Summer Olympics.

Hayashi competed at the 2020 Olympic Games in Tokyo, representing the Japanese team. He finished 48th in the individual competition.
