= Liu Lina =

Chinese equestrian

Medal record

Equestrianism

Representing China

Asian Games
Silver medal – second place	2010 Guangzhou	Team dressage

Liu Lina (simplified Chinese: 刘丽娜; traditional Chinese: 劉麗娜; pinyin: Liú Lìnà; born 1979-02-20 in Xinjiang) is an Olympic equestrian sportswoman for China. Her best performance is winning the 2006 National Equestrian (Dressage) Championships. She competed at the 2008 Summer Olympics in Beijing in the dressage event.
