= Quzandria Nur =

Malaysian equestrian

Personal information
- Full name: Quzandria Nur Dato' Mahamad Fathil
- Born: April 25, 1982 (age 44) Kuala Lumpur, Malaysia

Sport
- Country: Malaysia
- Sport: Equestrian
- Club: 3Q Equestrian
Medal record
Equestrian
Representing Malaysia
Asian Games
Silver medal – second place	1998 Bangkok	Team dressage
Silver medal – second place	2006 Doha	Team dressage
Bronze medal – third place	2010 Guangzhou	Team dressage
Silver medal – second place	2010 Guangzhou	Individual dressage
SEA Games
Silver medal – second place	2001 Kuala Lumpur	Individual dressage
Gold medal – first place	2001 Kuala Lumpur	Team dressage
Gold medal – first place	2007 Nakhon Ratchasima	Team dressage
Silver medal – second place	2007 Nakhon Ratchasima	Individual dressage
Gold medal – first place	2017 Kuala Lumpur	Team dressage
Gold medal – first place	2017 Kuala Lumpur	Individual dressage

Quzandria Nur Dato' Mahamad Fathil (born 25 April 1982) is a Malaysian equestrian rider. Nur competed at three Asian Games in Bangkok 1998, Doha 2006 and Guangzhou 2010. In 1998, she was a member of the silver winning Malaysian team. In 2006 she won team silver and in 2010, she won individual silver and team bronze. Nur also competed at three South East Asian Games. In 2001 she won team gold and individual silver and a golden team medal and individual silver in 2007. She won individual gold and team gold with the Malaysian team in 2017.

Her brother, Qabil Ambak, is also an international dressage and jumping rider representing Malaysia. Together, they were team members in several Asian Championships. In 2012, Nur tried to qualify for the 2012 Olympic Games by training with Olympic Champion Anky van Grunsven.
