= Kim Dong-seon =

South Korean equestrian (born 1989)

Personal information
- Born: May 30, 1989 (age 37) Seoul, South Korea
Medal record
Equestrian
Representing South Korea
Asian Games
| Gold medal – first place | 2006 Doha | Team dressage |
| Gold medal – first place | 2010 Guangzhou | Team dressage |
| Gold medal – first place | 2014 Incheon | Team dressage |
| Silver medal – second place | 2014 Incheon | Individual dressage |

Kim Dong-seon (Korean: 김동선, Korean pronunciation: [kim.doŋ.sʌn] or [kim] [toŋ.sʌn]; born 30 May 1989) is a South Korean dressage rider. He competed at the 2016 Summer Olympics in Rio de Janeiro, where he placed 43rd in the individual competition aboard Bukowski. He also competed at the 2020 Olympic Games in Tokyo, where he finished 55th in the individual competition.

Kim is a graduate of Dartmouth College. Kim took part at two World Equestrian Games (in 2014 and 2018). His best result was achieved in 2018, when he placed 47th.

He also competed at three Asian Games (in 2006, 2010 and 2014), where he altogether won three team gold medals and an individual silver medal. He qualified for the 2014 Dressage World Cup Finals in Lyon, France, where he finished in 17th position.

In 2020, Kim briefly retired from the international competition in order to pursue a career as an investment banker. He returned to dressage in 2021 with an aim of taking part at the postponed Tokyo Olympics.

In 2022, Kim was appointed as the head of strategic management at Hanwha Galleria and in 2023, he led the launch of american fast casual restaurant Five Guys into Korea as his first project.

He also has taken on the leadership position of Hanwha Robotics' strategic planning division. It aims to expand its robotics lineup not only through its existing flagship industrial collaborative robots but also by developing applications for customer services.
