= Kim Kyun-sub =

South Korean equestrian (born 1981)

Personal information
- Born: September 18, 1981 (age 44)

Sport
- Country: South Korea
- Sport: Equestrian

Achievements and titles
- Regional finals: 2010 Asian Games, 2014 Asian Games, 2018 Asian Games
Medal record
Equestrian
Representing South Korea
Asian Games
| Gold medal – first place | 2010 Guangzhou | Team dressage |
| Gold medal – first place | 2014 Incheon | Team dressage |
| Silver medal – second place | 2018 Jakarta-Palembang | Team dressage |

Kim Kyun-sub (born 18 September 1981) is a South Korean equestrian athlete. He is a double team gold medallist at the 2010 Asian Games and at the 2014 Asian Games, competing in dressage for South Korea. During the 2018 Asian Games he won a silver team medal with the South Korean dressage team. Kim started as eventing rider and competed at the 2002 Asian Games, later he switched to dressage and also competed internationally in show-jumping.

His late uncle Kim Hyung-chil died at the 2006 Asian Games during the individual eventing competition.
