= Natalya Yurkevich =

Kazakhstani dressage rider

Personal information
- Born: December 9, 1967 (age 58)

Natalya Yurkevich (born 9 December 1967) is a Kazakhstani dressage rider. She was scheduled to compete for Kazakh team at the 2014 World Equestrian Games but was forced to withdraw after her horse Donpetro failed to pass the compulsory vet check.

She represented Kazakhstan at two Asian Games.
