= Kim Hyung-chil =

South Korean equestrian (1959–2006)

Personal information
- Born: 1 July 1959 Gwangju, South Korea
- Died: 7 December 2006 (age 47) Doha, Qatar
Medal record
Equestrian
Asian Games
Silver medal – second place	2002 Asian Games	eventing

Kim Hyung-chil (Korean: 김형칠; Hanja: 金亨七; 1 July 1959 in Gwangju - 7 December 2006 in Doha) was a South Korean horse rider. He was a silver medalist in the three-day team event at the 2002 Asian Games in Busan, and was the oldest member of South Korea's equestrian team. Kim participated in the Seoul 1988 and Barcelona 1992 Summer Olympics and also featured in the World Championships in equestrianism.

He died on December 7, 2006, when he fell from his horse during the 2006 Asian Games Equestrian competition. The incident occurred on jump No. 8 during the cross country stage of the three-day event, Asian Games organizing committee spokesman Ahmed Abdulla Al Khulaifi said. After steady rain, the track condition was far from ideal and, although the first 10 competitors finished the race without incident, tragedy struck for Kim, the 11th competitor of the race.

Television footage shows that his horse, Bundaberg Black, got caught in a fence obstacle, first throwing Kim over the obstacle; the horse was subsequently catapulted over, crushing the front of Kim's head and his chest area when the horse's flanks landed on him. Kim never regained consciousness and died shortly before noon local time. According to Abduluahab al-Museh, the organizing committee's doping and medical staff Kim suffered from severe trauma to his head, neck, and upper chest and had multiple skull fractures.

Kim's death was the first fatality in the cross-country event in Asian Games history, and the first South Korean fatality at a major international equestrian event.
