= Yeh Hsiu-hua =

Taiwanese equestrian

Hsiu-hua Yeh
Personal information
- Nickname: Louisa
- Born: 4 June 1977 (age 49) Kaohsiung, Taiwan

Sport
- Country: Chinese Taipei
- Sport: Equestrian

Achievements and titles
- Regional finals: 2010 Asian Games, 2014 Asian Games, 2022 Asian Games
Medal record
Equestrian
Representing Chinese Taipei
Asian Games
Bronze medal – third place	2014 Incheon	Team dressage

Hsiu-hua Yeh (born 4 June 1977), also known as Louisa Yeh, is a Taiwanese dressage rider. She competed at four Asian Games, including the 2006 Asian Games in Doha, the 2010 Asian Games in Guangzhou, the 2014 Asian Games in Incheon and the 2022 Asian Games in Hangzhou.

Yeh was part of the Taiwanese dressage team that won bronze at the 2014 Asian Games, which was the second time for Taiwan to win a medal in dressage during the Asian Games.
