= Indonesia at the 2018 Asian Games =

- IOC code: INA
- NOC: Indonesian Olympic Committee
- Website: www.nocindonesia.or.id (in English)

in Jakarta and Palembang August 18 – September 2
- Competitors: 941 in 40 sports
- Flag bearers: I Gede Siman Sudartawa (opening); Hanifan Yudani Kusumah (closing)
- Medals Ranked 4th: Gold 31 Silver 24 Bronze 43 Total 98

Asian Games appearances (overview)
- 1951; 1954; 1958; 1962; 1966; 1970; 1974; 1978; 1982; 1986; 1990; 1994; 1998; 2002; 2006; 2010; 2014; 2018; 2022; 2026

Indonesia was the host nation of 2018 Asian Games held in Jakarta and Palembang from 18 August to 2 September 2018. Indonesia competed with 938 athletes, the most in the Games.

Vice President of Indonesia Jusuf Kalla assigned the then-National Police Deputy Chief Commissioner General Syafruddin as chef de mission for the Indonesian contingent.

== Competitors ==
The following is a list of the number of competitors representing Indonesia that participated at the Games:

| Sport | Men | Women | Total |
|---|---|---|---|
| Archery | 8 | 8 | 16 |
| Artistic swimming | — | 8 | 8 |
| Athletics | 34 | 23 | 57 |
| Badminton | 10 | 10 | 20 |
| Baseball | 24 | — | 24 |
| Basketball | 16 | 16 | 32 |
| Bowling | 6 | 6 | 12 |
| Boxing | 7 | 3 | 10 |
| Canoeing | 25 | 21 | 46 |
| Contract bridge | 13 | 11 | 24 |
| Cycling | 22 | 14 | 36 |
| Diving | 4 | 5 | 9 |
| Equestrian | 8 | 4 | 12 |
| Fencing | 12 | 12 | 24 |
| Field hockey | 18 | 18 | 36 |
| Football | 20 | 20 | 40 |
| Golf | 4 | 3 | 7 |
| Gymnastics | 7 | 7 | 14 |
| Handball | 16 | 16 | 32 |
| Jet ski | 3 | 0 | 3 |
| Judo | 9 | 7 | 16 |
| Ju-jitsu | 12 | 4 | 16 |
| Kabaddi | 12 | 12 | 24 |
| Karate | 4 | 4 | 8 |
| Kurash | 8 | 6 | 14 |
| Modern pentathlon | 2 | 2 | 4 |
| Paragliding | 5 | 3 | 8 |
| Pencak silat | 13 | 9 | 22 |
| Roller sports | 6 | 4 | 10 |
| Rowing | 18 | 9 | 27 |
| Rugby sevens | 12 | 12 | 24 |
| Sailing | 8 | 8 | 16 |
| Sambo | 4 | 4 | 8 |
| Sepak takraw | 12 | 12 | 24 |
| Shooting | 17 | 11 | 28 |
| Soft tennis | 5 | 5 | 10 |
| Softball | — | 17 | 17 |
| Sport climbing | 10 | 10 | 20 |
| Squash | 4 | 4 | 8 |
| Swimming | 9 | 10 | 19 |
| Table tennis | 5 | 5 | 10 |
| Taekwondo | 9 | 9 | 18 |
| Tennis | 5 | 5 | 10 |
| Triathlon | 3 | 3 | 6 |
| Volleyball | 18 | 18 | 36 |
| Water polo | 13 | 13 | 26 |
| Weightlifting | 7 | 6 | 13 |
| Wrestling | 12 | 6 | 18 |
| Wushu | 8 | 5 | 13 |
| Total | 507 | 428 | 935 |

Demonstration events

| Sport | Men | Women | Total |
|---|---|---|---|
| Canoe polo | 6 | 0 | 6 |
| eSports | 18 | 0 | 18 |

== Medalists ==
The following Indonesia competitors won medals at the Games.

| Medal | Name | Sport | Event | Date |
|---|---|---|---|---|
| Gold | Defia Rosmaniar | Taekwondo | Women's individual poomsae | 19 Aug |
| Gold | Lindswell Kwok | Wushu | Women's taijiquan | 20 Aug |
| Gold | Tiara Andini Prastika | Cycling | Women's downhill | 20 Aug |
| Gold | Khoiful Mukhib | Cycling | Men's downhill | 20 Aug |
| Gold | Eko Yuli Irawan | Weightlifting | Men's 62 kg | 21 Aug |
| Gold | Aris Apriansyah; Hening Paradigma; Jafro Megawanto; Joni Efendi; Roni Pratama | Paragliding | Men's team accuracy | 22 Aug |
| Gold | Jafro Megawanto | Paragliding | Men's individual accuracy | 23 Aug |
| Gold | Aries Susanti Rahayu | Sport climbing | Women's speed | 23 Aug |
| Gold | Ali Buton; Ardi Isadi; Ferdian Syah; Ihram Ihram; Jefri Ardianto; Muhad Yakin; Rio Rizki Darmawan; Tanzil Hadid; Ujang Hasbulloh | Rowing | Men's lightweight eight | 24 Aug |
| Gold | Christopher Rungkat; Aldila Sutjiadi | Tennis | Mixed doubles | 25 Aug |
| Gold | Rifki Ardiansyah Arrosyiid | Karate | Men's kumite 60 kg | 26 Aug |
| Gold | Aqsa Sutan Aswar | Jet ski | Endurance runabout open | 26 Aug |
| Gold | Puspa Arumsari | Pencak silat | Women's tunggal | 27 Aug |
| Gold | Hendy Hendy; Yola Primadona Jampil | Pencak silat | Men's ganda | 27 Aug |
| Gold | Anggi Faisal; Asep Yuldan; Nunu Nugraha | Pencak silat | Men's regu | 27 Aug |
| Gold | Aji Bangkit Pamungkas | Pencak silat | Men's tanding 90 kg | 27 Aug |
| Gold | Komang Harik Adi Putra | Pencak silat | Men's tanding 70 kg | 27 Aug |
| Gold | Iqbal Candra Pratama | Pencak silat | Men's tanding 65 kg | 27 Aug |
| Gold | Sarah Tria Monita | Pencak silat | Women's tanding 60 kg | 27 Aug |
| Gold | Abdul Malik | Pencak silat | Men's tanding 55 kg | 27 Aug |
| Gold | Aries Susanti Rahayu; Fitriyani; Puji Lestari; Rajiah Sallsabillah | Sport climbing | Women's speed relay | 27 Aug |
| Gold | Abu Dzar Yulianto; Veddriq Leonardo; Muhammad Hinayah; Rindi Sufriyanto | Sport climbing | Men's speed relay | 27 Aug |
| Gold | Jonatan Christie | Badminton | Men's singles | 28 Aug |
| Gold | Marcus Fernaldi Gideon; Kevin Sanjaya Sukamuljo | Badminton | Men's doubles | 28 Aug |
| Gold | Sugianto | Pencak silat | Men's tunggal | 29 Aug |
| Gold | Ayu Sidan Wilantari; Ni Made Dwiyanti | Pencak silat | Women's ganda | 29 Aug |
| Gold | Gina Tri Lestari; Lutfi Nurhasanah; Pramudita Yuristya | Pencak silat | Women's regu | 29 Aug |
| Gold | Pipiet Kamelia | Pencak silat | Women's tanding 65 kg | 29 Aug |
| Gold | Hanifan Yudani Kusumah | Pencak silat | Men's tanding 60 kg | 29 Aug |
| Gold | Wewey Wita | Pencak silat | Women's tanding 55 kg | 29 Aug |
| Gold | Abdul Halim Radjiu; Husni Uba; Muhammad Hardiansyah Muliang; Nofrizal; Rizky Abdul Rahan Pago; Saiful Rijal | Sepak takraw | Men's quadrant | 1 Sep |
| Silver | Edgar Xavier Marvelo | Wushu | Men's changquan | 19 Aug |
| Silver | Sri Wahyuni Agustiani | Weightlifting | Women's 48 kg | 20 Aug |
| Silver | Ike Ayu Wulandari; Lis Adriana; Rika Wijayanti | Paragliding | Women's team accuracy | 22 Aug |
| Silver | Anthony Sinisuka Ginting; Fajar Alfian; Ihsan Maulana Mustofa; Jonatan Christie; Kevin Sanjaya Sukamuljo; Marcus Fernaldi Gideon; Mohammad Ahsan; Muhammad Rian Ardianto; Ricky Karanda Suwardi; Tontowi Ahmad | Badminton | Men's team | 22 Aug |
| Silver | Ali Buton; Ardi Isadi; Ferdian Syan; Ihram Ihram | Rowing | Men's lightweight coxless four | 23 Aug |
| Silver | Puji Lestari | Sport climbing | Women's speed | 23 Aug |
| Silver | Edwin Ginanjar Rudiana; Kakan Kusmana; La Memo; Sulpianto Sulpianto | Rowing | Men's quadruple sculls | 24 Aug |
| Silver | Aero Sutan Aswar | Jet ski | Runabout limited | 24 Aug |
| Silver | Rifda Irfanaluthfi | Gymnastics | Women's floor | 24 Aug |
| Silver | Muhammad Sejahtera Dwi Putra | Shooting | Men's 10 m running target mixed | 25 Aug |
| Silver | I Gusti Bagus Saputra | Cycling | Men's BMX race | 25 Aug |
| Silver | Alvonsina Monim; Astri Dwijayanti; Aswiati; Christina Kafolakari; Emiliana Deau; Fazriah Nurbayan; Masripah; Ramla B; Raudani Fitra; Riana Yulistrian; Ririn Puji Astuti; Risti Ardianti; Selvianti Devi Hidayat; Shifa Garnika Nur Karim; Since Lithasova Yom; Stevani Maysche Ibo | Canoeing | Women's TBR-12 200 m | 25 Aug |
| Silver | Emilia Nova | Athletics | Women's 100 m hurdles | 26 Aug |
| Silver | Andri Agus Mulyana; Anwar Tarra; Arpan Arpan; Dedi Saputra; Erwin David Monim; Marjuki; Medi Juana; Mochamad Taufan Wijaya; Muhammad Fajar Faturahman; Muhammad Yunus Rustandi; Poliyansyah Poliyan Syah; Rio Akbar; Spens Stuber Mehue; Sutrisno Sutrsino; Syahrul Saputra; Yuda Firmansyah | Canoeing | Men's TBR-12 1000 m | 27 Aug |
| Silver | Aspar; Muhammad Fajri Alfian; Pangeran Septo Wibowo Siburian; Sabri | Sport climbing | Men's speed relay | 27 Aug |
| Silver | Diananda Choirunisa | Archery | Women's individual recurve | 28 Aug |
| Silver | Abdul Halim Radjiu; Herson Mohamad Saipul; Muhammad Hardiansyah Muliang; Nofrizal; Victoria Eka Prasetya | Sepak takraw | Men's regu | 28 Aug |
| Silver | Fajar Alfian; Muhammad Rian Ardianto | Badminton | Men's doubles | 28 Aug |
| Silver | Ade Candra Rachmawan; Muhammad Ashfiya | Volleyball | Men's beach volleyball | 28 Aug |
| Silver | Jason Dennis Lijnzaat | Roller sports | Men's park skateboarding | 29 Aug |
| Silver | Alexander Elbert Sie | Soft tennis | Men's singles | 29 Aug |
| Silver | Sanggoe Darma Tanjung | Roller sports | Men's street skateboarding | 29 Aug |
| Silver | Mohammad Fadlin; Lalu Muhammad Zohri; Eko Rimbawan; Bayu Kertanegara | Athletics | Men's 4 × 100 m relay | 30 Aug |
| Silver | Riska Andriyani | Canoeing | Women's C-1 200 m | 1 Sep |
| Bronze | Nining Porwaningsih | Cycling | Women's downhill | 20 Aug |
| Bronze | Surahmat bin Suwoto Wijoyo | Weightlifting | Men's 56 kg | 20 Aug |
| Bronze | Achmad Hulaefi | Wushu | Men's daoshu and gunshu | 21 Aug |
| Bronze | Apriyani Rahayu; Debby Susanto; Della Destiara Haris; Fitriani; Gregoria Mariska Tunjung; Greysia Polii; Liliyana Natsir; Ni Ketut Mahadewi Istarani; Rizki Amelia Pradipta; Ruselli Hartawan | Badminton | Women's team | 21 Aug |
| Bronze | Abdul Rahim Radjiu; Andi Try Sandi Saputra; Hendra Pago; Herson Mohamad Saipul; Husni Uba; Muhammad Hardiansyah Muliang; Nofrizal; Rezki Yusuf Djaina; Rizky Abdul Rahan Pago; Saiful Rijal; Syamsul Akmal; Victoria Eka Prasetya | Sepak takraw | Men's team regu | 21 Aug |
| Bronze | Yusuf Widiyanto | Wushu | Men's sanda 56 kg | 22 Aug |
| Bronze | Puja Riyaya | Wushu | Men's sanda 70 kg | 22 Aug |
| Bronze | Rika Wijayanti | Paragliding | Women's individual accuracy | 23 Aug |
| Bronze | Julianti; Yayah Rokayah | Rowing | Women's coxless pair | 23 Aug |
| Bronze | Aspar | Sport climbing | Men's speed | 23 Aug |
| Bronze | Chelsea Corputty; Julianti; Wa Ode Fitri Rahmanjani; Yayah Rokayah | Rowing | Women's coxless four | 24 Aug |
| Bronze | Aqsa Sutan Aswar | Jet ski | Runabout limited | 24 Aug |
| Bronze | Abdul Rahim Radjiu; Hendra Pago; Herson Mohamad Saipul; Husni Uba; Muhammad Hardiansyah Muliang; Nofrizal; Rezki Yusuf Djaina; Rizky Abdul Rahan Pago; Saiful Rijal | Sepak takraw | Men's team doubles | 24 Aug |
| Bronze | Agus Adi Prayoko | Gymnastics | Men's vault | 24 Aug |
| Bronze | Wiji Lestari | Cycling | Women's BMX race | 25 Aug |
| Bronze | Ahmad Zigi Zaresta Yuda | Karate | Men's individual kata | 25 Aug |
| Bronze | Cok Istri Agung Sanistyarani | Karate | Women's kumite 55 kg | 26 Aug |
| Bronze | Andri Agus Mulyana; Anwar Tarra; Arpan Arpan; Dedi Saputra; Erwin David Monim; Marjuki; Medi Juana; Mochamad Taufan Wijaya; Muhammad Fajar Faturahman; Muhammad Yunus Rustandi; Poliyan Syah; Rio Akbar; Spens Stuber Mehue; Sutrisno; Syahrul Saputra; Yuda Firmansyah | Canoeing | Men's TBR-12 500 m | 26 Aug |
| Bronze | Michael Bambang Hartono; Bert Toar Polii; Conny Eufke Sumampouw; Franky Steven Karwur; Jemmy Boyke Bojoh; Rury Andhani | Contract bridge | Supermixed team | 26 Aug |
| Bronze | Bill Roland George Mondigir; Julita Grace Joice Tueje; Lusje Olha Bojoh; Marcella Elvitta Chyntia Lasut; Raufik Gautama Asbi; Robert Parasian | Contract bridge | Mixed team | 26 Aug |
| Bronze | Jintar Simanjuntak | Karate | Men's kumite 67 kg | 26 Aug |
| Bronze | Liliyana Natsir; Tontowi Ahmad | Badminton | Mixed doubles | 26 Aug |
| Bronze | Apriyani Rahayu; Greysia Polii | Badminton | Women's doubles | 26 Aug |
| Bronze | Sapwaturrahman | Athletics | Men's long jump | 26 Aug |
| Bronze | Amri Rusdana | Pencak silat | Men's tanding 75 kg | 26 Aug |
| Bronze | Dhita Juliana; Putu Dini Jasita Utami | Volleyball | Women's beach volleyball | 27 Aug |
| Bronze | Anthony Sinisuka Ginting | Badminton | Men's singles | 27 Aug |
| Bronze | Riau Ega Agata | Archery | Men's individual recurve | 28 Aug |
| Bronze | Danangsyah Yudistira Pribadi; Gilang Ramadhan | Volleyball | Men's beach volleyball | 28 Aug |
| Bronze | Pevi Permana Putra | Roller sports | Men's park skateboarding | 29 Aug |
| Bronze | Bunga Nyimas | Roller sports | Women's street skateboarding | 29 Aug |
| Bronze | Prima Simpatiaji | Soft tennis | Men's singles | 29 Aug |
| Bronze | Dwi Rahayu Pitri | Soft tennis | Women's singles | 29 Aug |
| Bronze | Ike Ayu Wulandari; Lis Adriana; Rika Wijayanti | Paragliding | Women's team cross country | 29 Aug |
| Bronze | Aris Apriansyah; Hening Paradigma; Jafro Megawanto; Joni Efendi; Roni Pratama | Paragliding | Men's team cross country | 29 Aug |
| Bronze | Khasani Najmu Shifa | Kurash | Women's 63 kg | 29 Aug |
| Bronze | Nur Meni; Riska Andriyani | Canoeing | Women's C-2 500 m | 30 Aug |
| Bronze | Akyko Micheel Kapito; Dini Mita Sari; Florensia Cristy; Kusnelia Kusnelia; Lena Lena; Leni Leni | Sepak takraw | Women's quadrant | 31 Aug |
| Bronze | Huswatun Hasanah | Boxing | Women's 60 kg | 31 Aug |
| Bronze | Sunan Agung Amoragam | Boxing | Men's 56 kg | 31 Aug |
| Bronze | Alexander Elbert Sie; Gusti Jaya Kusuma; Hemat Bhakti Anugerah; Irfandi Hendrawan; Prima Simpatiaji | Soft tennis | Men's team | 1 Sep |
| Bronze | Freddy Eddy Manoppo; Henky Lasut | Contract bridge | Men's pair | 1 Sep |
| Bronze | Lusje Olha Bojoh; Taufik Asbi | Contract bridge | Mixed pair | 1 Sep |

Medals by sport
| Sport | 1st place, gold medalist(s) | 2nd place, silver medalist(s) | 3rd place, bronze medalist(s) | Total |
| Archery | 0 | 1 | 1 | 2 |
| Athletics | 0 | 2 | 1 | 3 |
| Badminton | 2 | 2 | 4 | 8 |
| Boxing | 0 | 0 | 2 | 2 |
| Canoeing | 0 | 3 | 2 | 5 |
| Contract bridge | 0 | 0 | 4 | 4 |
| Cycling | 2 | 1 | 2 | 5 |
| Gymnastics | 0 | 1 | 1 | 2 |
| Jet ski | 1 | 1 | 1 | 3 |
| Karate | 1 | 0 | 3 | 4 |
| Kurash | 0 | 0 | 1 | 1 |
| Paragliding | 2 | 1 | 3 | 6 |
| Pencak silat | 14 | 0 | 1 | 15 |
| Roller sports | 0 | 2 | 2 | 2 |
| Rowing | 1 | 2 | 2 | 5 |
| Sepak takraw | 1 | 1 | 3 | 5 |
| Shooting | 0 | 1 | 0 | 1 |
| Soft tennis | 0 | 1 | 3 | 3 |
| Sport climbing | 3 | 2 | 1 | 6 |
| Taekwondo | 1 | 0 | 0 | 1 |
| Tennis | 1 | 0 | 0 | 1 |
| Weightlifting | 1 | 1 | 1 | 3 |
| Volleyball | 0 | 1 | 2 | 3 |
| Wushu | 1 | 1 | 3 | 5 |
| Total | 31 | 24 | 43 | 98 |

Medals by day
| Day | Date | 1st place, gold medalist(s) | 2nd place, silver medalist(s) | 3rd place, bronze medalist(s) | Total |
| 1 | August 19 | 1 | 1 | 0 | 2 |
| 2 | August 20 | 3 | 1 | 2 | 6 |
| 3 | August 21 | 1 | 0 | 3 | 4 |
| 4 | August 22 | 1 | 2 | 2 | 5 |
| 5 | August 23 | 2 | 2 | 3 | 7 |
| 6 | August 24 | 1 | 3 | 4 | 8 |
| 7 | August 25 | 1 | 3 | 2 | 6 |
| 8 | August 26 | 2 | 1 | 9 | 12 |
| 9 | August 27 | 10 | 2 | 2 | 14 |
| 10 | August 28 | 2 | 4 | 2 | 8 |
| 11 | August 29 | 6 | 3 | 7 | 16 |
| 12 | August 30 | 0 | 1 | 1 | 2 |
| 13 | August 31 | 0 | 0 | 3 | 3 |
| 14 | September 1 | 1 | 1 | 3 | 5 |
| Total | | 31 | 24 | 43 | 98 |

—

Medals by gender
| Gender | 1st place, gold medalist(s) | 2nd place, silver medalist(s) | 3rd place, bronze medalist(s) | Total | Percentage |
| Male | 19 | 16 | 23 | 58 | 59,14% |
| Female | 11 | 8 | 16 | 35 | 36,56% |
| Mixed | 1 | 0 | 4 | 5 | 4,30% |
| Total | 31 | 24 | 43 | 98 | 100% |

== Demonstration sports medalists ==
eSports was featured at the 2018 Asian Games as a demonstration sport, meaning medals won in this sport will not be counted in the official overall medal tally. It was held from 26 August to 1 September. Six video game titles were featured in the demonstration event. Indonesia collected 2 medals, 1 gold and 1 silver, and finished second in the table.

The following Indonesia competitors won medals at the demonstration games.

| Medal | Name | Sport | Event | Date |
|---|---|---|---|---|
| Gold | Ridel Yesaya Sumarandak | eSports | Clash Royale | 27 Aug |
| Silver | Hendry Koentarto Handisurya | eSports | Hearthstone | 31 Aug |

== Archery ==
Recurve

| Athlete | Event | Ranking round | | Round of 64 | Round of 32 | Round of 16 | Quarterfinals | Semifinals | Final / BM | |
| Athlete | Event | Score | Seed | Opposition score | Opposition score | Opposition score | Opposition score | Opposition score | Opposition score | Rank |
|---|---|---|---|---|---|---|---|---|---|---|
| Riau Ega Agata | Men's individual | 649 | 19 | Majeed (PAK); W 6–0 | Hasrin (MAS); W 6–5 | Shana (BAN); W 6–4 | Das (IND); W 7–3 | Kim (KOR); L 2–6 | Abdullin (KAZ); W 6–2 | 3rd place, bronze medalist(s) |
| Alek Edwar | Men's individual | 636 | 27 | Tshering (BHU); W 6–2 | Gankin (KAZ); L 3–7 | did not advance | | | | |
| Okka Bagus Subekti | Men's individual | 625 | 50 | did not advance | | | | | | |
| Muhammad Hanif Wijaya | Men's individual | 613 | 63 | did not advance | | | | | | |
| Alek Edwar; Okka Bagus Subekti; Riau Ega Agata | Men's team | 1910 | 11 | —N/a | Bye | Japan; L 2–6 | did not advance | | | |
| Diananda Choirunisa | Women's individual | 662 | 7 | Bye | Dema (BHU); W 6–4 | Nemati (IRI); WO | Chang (KOR); W 7–3 | Le (TPE); W 7–3 | Zhang (CHN); L 3–7 | 2nd place, silver medalist(s) |
| Aqidatul Izzah | Women's individual | 615 | 39 | did not advance | | | | | | |
| Titik Kusumawardani | Women's individual | 636 | 25 | did not advance | | | | | | |
| Linda Lestari | Women's individual | 651 | 11 | Bye | Mazlan (MAS); W 6–4 | Sugimoto (JPN); L 2–6 | did not advance | | | |
| Diananda Choirunisa; Titik Kusumawardani; Linda Lestari | Women's team | 1949 | 5 | —N/a | | Hong Kong; W 6–2 | Japan; L 0–6 | did not advance | | |
| Riau Ega Agata; Diananda Choirunisa | Mixed team | 1311 | 7 | —N/a | Bye | North Korea; L 3–5 | did not advance | | | |

Compound

| Athlete | Event | Ranking round | | Round of 32 | Round of 16 | Quarterfinals | Semifinals | Final / BM | |
| Athlete | Event | Score | Seed | Opposition score | Opposition score | Opposition score | Opposition score | Opposition score | Rank |
|---|---|---|---|---|---|---|---|---|---|
| Muhammad Rindanto; Prima Wisnu Wardhana; Yoke Rizaldi Akbar; Indra Prasetyo | Men's team | 2062 | 8 | —N/a | Bangladesh; W 230–228 | South Korea; L 220–231 | did not advance | | |
| Dellie Threesyadinda; Sri Ranti; Yurike Nina Bonita Pereira; Triya Resky Andriyani | Women's team | 2042 | 7 | —N/a | Bangladesh; W 222–208 | India; L 224–229 | did not advance | | |
| Yoke Rizaldi Akbar; Dellie Threesyadinda | Mixed team | 1377 | 8 | Bye | Thailand; W 153–152 | South Korea; L 148–153 | did not advance | | |

== Artistic swimming ==
| Athlete | Event | Technical routine | | Free routine | | Total | Rank |
| Athlete | Event | Points | Rank | Points | Rank | Total | Rank |
|---|---|---|---|---|---|---|---|
| Naima Syeeda Sharita; Andriani Shintya Ardhana; Nurfa Nurul Utami^{*} | Duet | 62.6657 | 11 | 65.9667 | 11 | 128.6324 | 11 |
| Andriani Shintya Ardhana; Nabila Putri Giswatama; Sherly Haryono; Maharani Sekar Langit; Petra Septaria Puspa Melati; Iin Ramadhania; Naima Syeeda; Nurfa Nurul Utami | Team | 64.5059 | 10 | 67.7667 | 10 | 132.2726 | 10 |

^{*} Did not play.

== Badminton ==
Indonesia announced its squad of 20 players (10 men's and 10 women's) on 30 June 2018.

Men

| Athlete | Event | Round of 64 | Round of 32 | Round of 16 | Quarterfinals | Semifinals | Final | |
| Athlete | Event | Opposition score | Opposition score | Opposition score | Opposition score | Opposition score | Opposition score | Rank |
|---|---|---|---|---|---|---|---|---|
| Anthony Sinisuka Ginting | Singles | Bye | M Shahbazi (IRI); W (21–8, 21–9) | K Momota (JPN); W (21–18, 21–18) | Chen L (CHN); W (21–19, 21–11) | Chou T-c (TPE); L (21–16, 21–23, 17–21) | Did not advance | 3rd place, bronze medalist(s) |
| Jonatan Christie | Singles | Bye | Shi YQ (CHN); W (21–19, 19–21, 21–17) | K Phetpradab (THA); W (17–21, 21–18, 21–18) | Wong W K (HKG); W (21–11, 21–18) | K Nishimoto (JPN); W (21–15, 15–21, 21–19) | Chou T-c (TPE); W (21–18, 20–22, 21–15) | 1st place, gold medalist(s) |
| Marcus Fernaldi Gideon; Kevin Sanjaya Sukamuljo | Doubles | —N/a | Bye | T Inoue / Y Kaneko (JPN); W (21–16, 19–21, 21–18) | Goh V S / Tan W K (MAS); W (22–20, 21–19) | Lee J-h / Lee Y (TPE); W (21–15, 20–22, 21–12) | F Alfian/ M R Ardianto (INA); W (13–21, 21–18, 24–22) | 1st place, gold medalist(s) |
| Fajar Alfian; Muhammad Rian Ardianto | Doubles | —N/a | K Byambajav / B Munkhbat (MGL); W (21–4, 21–7) | Kim W-h / Seo S-j (KOR); W (21–18, 21–13) | Ong Y S / Teo E Y (MAS); W (21–17, 21–13) | Li JH / Liu YC (CHN); W (21–14, 19–21, 21–13) | M F Gideon / K S Sukamuljo (INA); L (21–13, 18–21, 22–24) | 2nd place, silver medalist(s) |
| Jonatan Christie; Anthony Sinisuka Ginting; Ihsan Maulana Mustofa; Kevin Sanjaya Sukamuljo; Marcus Fernaldi Gideon; Fajar Alfian; Muhammad Rian Ardianto; Mohammad Ahsan; Tontowi Ahmad; Ricky Karanda Suwardi | Team | —N/a | | Bye | India; W 3–1 | Japan; W 3–1 | China; L 1–3 | 2nd place, silver medalist(s) |

Women

| Athlete | Event | Round of 32 | Round of 16 | Quarterfinals | Semifinals | Final | |
| Athlete | Event | Opposition score | Opposition score | Opposition score | Opposition score | Opposition score | Rank |
|---|---|---|---|---|---|---|---|
| Gregoria Mariska Tunjung | Singles | Ng W C (MAC); W (21–4, 21–7) | P. V. Sindhu (IND); L (12–21, 15–21) | Did not advance | | | |
| Fitriani | Singles | T P Hendahewa (SRI); W (21–6, 21–4) | S Nehwal (IND); L (6–21, 14–21) | Did not advance | | | |
| Greysia Polii; Apriyani Rahayu | Doubles | Bye | C Chaladchalam / P Muenwong (THA); W (21–12, 21–9) | Tang/ Zheng (CHN); W (18–21, 24–22, 21–16) | Misaki Matsutomo / Ayaka Takahashi (JPN); L (15–21, 17–21) | Did not advance | 3rd place, bronze medalist(s) |
| Della Destiara Haris; Rizki Amelia Pradipta | Doubles | A N Abdul Razzaq / F N Abdul Razzaq (MDV); W (21–6, 21–4) | Y Fukushima/ S Hirota (JPN); L (17–21, 13–21) | did not advance | | | |
| Fitriani; Gregoria Mariska Tunjung; Ruselli Hartawan; Greysia Polii; Apriyani Rahayu; Della Destiara Haris; Rizki Amelia Pradipta; Ni Ketut Mahadewi Istarani; Liliyana Natsir; Debby Susanto | Team | —N/a | Hong Kong; W 3–0 | South Korea; W 3–1 | Japan; L 1–3 | Did not advance | 3rd place, bronze medalist(s) |

Mixed

| Athlete | Event | Round of 32 | Round of 16 | Quarterfinals | Semifinals | Final | |
| Athlete | Event | Opposition score | Opposition score | Opposition score | Opposition score | Opposition score | Rank |
|---|---|---|---|---|---|---|---|
| Tontowi Ahmad; Liliyana Natsir | Mixed | Bye | Seo S-j / Chae Y-j (KOR); W (22–20, 21–17) | Lee/ Chau (HKG); W (21–15, 17–21, 21–16) | Zheng SW / Huang YQ (CHN); L (13–21, 18–21) | Did not advance | 3rd place, bronze medalist(s) |
| Ricky Karanda Suwardi; Debby Susanto | Mixed | R Tamang / N Tamang (NEP); W (21–13, 21–7) | D Puavaranukroh / S Taerattanachai (THA); L (22–20, 18–21, 13–21) | did not advance | | | |

== Baseball ==
Indonesia sent a men's team to make its debut in the baseball competition at the Asian Games. The team were drawn in the group B alongside Hong Kong, South Korea and Chinese Taipei.

| Team | Event | Round 1 | | Round 2 | | Super / Consolation | | Final / BM | |
| Team | Event | Oppositions scores | Rank | Oppositions scores | Rank | Oppositions scores | Rank | Opposition score | Rank |
|---|---|---|---|---|---|---|---|---|---|
| Indonesia men's | Men's tournament | Bye | | Hong Kong: L 4–7; South Korea: L 0–15; Chinese Taipei: L 0–15 | 4 | Pakistan: L 2–10; Thailand: W 12–11 | 3 | Did not advance | 7 |

Roster

The following is the Indonesia roster for the men's baseball tournament of the 2018 Asian Games.

Manager
Lukmanul Hakim

| Pos. | No. | Player | Date of birth (age) | Bats | Throws | Club |
|---|---|---|---|---|---|---|
| C | 2 | Faldy Akhmad Zulfikar | 24 June 1997 (aged 21) | | | |
| IF | 3 | All Luthvy Jhonata | 3 December 1991 (aged 26) | | | (Indonesia) Teladan |
| P | 5 | Nanda Dwi Saputra | 23 March 1988 (aged 30) | | | (Indonesia) Garuda |
| C | 6 | Muharom | 2 August 1989 (aged 29) | | | (Indonesia) Gorgeous |
| IF | 9 | Hakeem Rahniady Putra Ady | 9 September 1998 (aged 19) | | | (Indonesia) Cheetahs |
| OF | 10 | Rizki Ramadan | 18 May 1986 (aged 32) | | | (Indonesia) Prambors |
| IF | 11 | Albefiandi Aiken Setiawan | 11 June 1989 (aged 29) | | | (Indonesia) Cheetahs |
| C | 12 | Jerry Rachman | 21 September 1995 (aged 22) | | | (Indonesia) Saburai |
| IF | 15 | Adi Susanto | 15 May 1980 (aged 38) | | | (Indonesia) Bumi Asri |
| IF | 16 | Bachtiar Sanjaya | 16 November 1988 (aged 29) | | | (Indonesia) Pejabat |
| C | 17 | Aditya Muflih Mahmud | 17 June 1995 (aged 23) | | | (Indonesia) Saburai |
| IF | 18 | Andospa Aldo Saputra | 18 June 1981 (aged 37) | | | (Indonesia) Saburai |
| P | 19 | Rawafi Yaputra Yanto Rozali | 6 August 1994 (aged 24) | | | (Indonesia) Saburai |
| P | 21 | Andika Arlistianto | 21 July 1987 (aged 31) | | | (Indonesia) Radjawali |
| P | 22 | Gunawan Pandu Khallista | 16 January 1985 (aged 33) | | | (Indonesia) Saburai |
| OF | 24 | Zidney Fahmidyan | 6 August 1995 (aged 23) | | | (Indonesia) Null |
| P | 25 | Lukman Kurnia Ramdhoni | 21 September 1976 (aged 41) | | | (Indonesia) Prambors |
| IF | 29 | Yana Gerhana | 18 March 1988 (aged 30) | | | (Indonesia) Laki Dende |
| IF | 32 | Diva Reza Fabil | 7 May 1996 (aged 22) | | | (Indonesia) Pejabat |
| P | 45 | Chindy Patria Yudharana | 23 May 1982 (aged 36) | | | (Indonesia) Garuda |
| P | 46 | Ramon Setiyono | 14 June 1987 (aged 31) | | | (Indonesia) Pejabat |
| P | 65 | Hadi Nur Muhammad | 29 March 1997 (aged 21) | | | (Indonesia) Pejabat |
| OF | 68 | Ranjani | 6 January 1991 (aged 27) | | | (Indonesia) NISP |
| OF | 69 | Riski Moehammad Adjhari | 5 August 1996 (aged 22) | | | (Indonesia) Bumi Asri |

Round 2 – Group B

| Pos | Team | Pld | W | L | RF | RA | PCT | GB | Qualification |
|---|---|---|---|---|---|---|---|---|---|
| 1 | Chinese Taipei | 3 | 3 | 0 | 33 | 2 | 1.000 | — | Super round |
| 2 | South Korea | 3 | 2 | 1 | 37 | 5 | .667 | 1 | Super round |
| 3 | Hong Kong | 3 | 1 | 2 | 11 | 41 | .333 | 2 | Consolation round |
| 4 | Indonesia | 3 | 0 | 3 | 4 | 37 | .000 | 3 | Consolation round |

Source: OCA

| 26 August; 12:00 | Indonesia | 4–7 | Hong Kong | Gelora Bung Karno Baseball Field, Jakarta; Attendance: 500; Umpires: Sung Yu-meng (TPE) |
| 26 August; 12:00 | LP: Chindy Patria Yudharana | Boxscore | WP: Sam Leung; Sv: Matthew Andrew Holliday | Gelora Bung Karno Baseball Field, Jakarta; Attendance: 500; Umpires: Sung Yu-meng (TPE) |
| 26 August; 12:00 | | Boxscore | HR: Matthew Andrew Holliday (1) | Gelora Bung Karno Baseball Field, Jakarta; Attendance: 500; Umpires: Sung Yu-meng (TPE) |

| Team | 1 | 2 | 3 | 4 | 5 | 6 | 7 | 8 | 9 | R | H | E |
|---|---|---|---|---|---|---|---|---|---|---|---|---|
| Hong Kong | 0 | 2 | 0 | 0 | 0 | 0 | 2 | 2 | 1 | 7 | 11 | 1 |
| Indonesia | 0 | 0 | 0 | 0 | 2 | 1 | 0 | 1 | 0 | 4 | 5 | 1 |

| 27 August; 18:30 | South Korea | 15–0 (F/5) | Indonesia | Gelora Bung Karno Baseball Field, Jakarta; Attendance: 150; Umpires: Yoshinori Koide (JPN) |
| 27 August; 18:30 | WP: Choi Won-tae | Boxscore | LP: Nanda Dwi Saputra | Gelora Bung Karno Baseball Field, Jakarta; Attendance: 150; Umpires: Yoshinori Koide (JPN) |
| 27 August; 18:30 | HR: Hwang Jae-gyun (2) | Boxscore | | Gelora Bung Karno Baseball Field, Jakarta; Attendance: 150; Umpires: Yoshinori Koide (JPN) |

| Team | 1 | 2 | 3 | 4 | 5 | 6 | 7 | 8 | 9 | R | H | E |
|---|---|---|---|---|---|---|---|---|---|---|---|---|
| Indonesia | 0 | 0 | 0 | 0 | 0 | — | — | — | — | 0 | 3 | 3 |
| South Korea | 1 | 4 | 6 | 2 | 2 | — | — | — | — | 15 | 13 | 0 |

| 28 August; 18:30 | Indonesia | 0–15 (F/7) | Chinese Taipei | Gelora Bung Karno Baseball Field, Jakarta; Attendance: 750; Umpires: Katsutoshi Takahashi (JPN) |
| 28 August; 18:30 | LP: Chindy Patria Yudharana | Boxscore | WP: Huang Chien-lung | Gelora Bung Karno Baseball Field, Jakarta; Attendance: 750; Umpires: Katsutoshi Takahashi (JPN) |

| Team | 1 | 2 | 3 | 4 | 5 | 6 | 7 | 8 | 9 | R | H | E |
|---|---|---|---|---|---|---|---|---|---|---|---|---|
| Chinese Taipei | 6 | 0 | 1 | 1 | 0 | 5 | 2 | — | — | 15 | 14 | 0 |
| Indonesia | 0 | 0 | 0 | 0 | 0 | 0 | 0 | — | — | 0 | 2 | 1 |

Consolation round

| Pos | Team | Pld | W | L | RF | RA | PCT | GB |
|---|---|---|---|---|---|---|---|---|
| 1 | Pakistan | 3 | 3 | 0 | 30 | 5 | 1.000 | — |
| 2 | Hong Kong | 3 | 2 | 1 | 14 | 20 | .667 | 1 |
| 3 | Indonesia | 3 | 1 | 2 | 18 | 28 | .333 | 2 |
| 4 | Thailand | 3 | 0 | 3 | 16 | 25 | .000 | 3 |

Source: OCA

| 30 August; 9:00 | Pakistan | 10–2 | Indonesia | Rawamangun Baseball Field, Jakarta; Attendance: 80; Umpires: Sung Yu-meng (TPE) |
| 30 August; 9:00 | WP: Muhammad Usman; Sv: Inayatullah Khan | Boxscore | LP: Nanda Dwi Saputra | Rawamangun Baseball Field, Jakarta; Attendance: 80; Umpires: Sung Yu-meng (TPE) |
| 30 August; 9:00 | HR: Muhammad Zakir (1), Jawad Ali (1) | Boxscore | | Rawamangun Baseball Field, Jakarta; Attendance: 80; Umpires: Sung Yu-meng (TPE) |

| Team | 1 | 2 | 3 | 4 | 5 | 6 | 7 | 8 | 9 | R | H | E |
|---|---|---|---|---|---|---|---|---|---|---|---|---|
| Indonesia | 1 | 0 | 0 | 0 | 0 | 1 | 0 | 0 | 0 | 2 | 8 | 4 |
| Pakistan | 0 | 0 | 0 | 4 | 0 | 5 | 0 | 1 | X | 10 | 12 | 1 |

| 31 August; 14:00 | Indonesia | 12–11 | Thailand | Rawamangun Baseball Field, Jakarta; Attendance: 100; Umpires: Chu Hsu-kuang (TPE) |
| 31 August; 14:00 | WP: Andika Arlistianto; Sv: Chindy Patria Yudharana | Boxscore | LP: Kevin Irwin | Rawamangun Baseball Field, Jakarta; Attendance: 100; Umpires: Chu Hsu-kuang (TPE) |
| 31 August; 14:00 | HR: Hakeem Yatim (1) | Boxscore | HR: Suratit Faengsup (1) | Rawamangun Baseball Field, Jakarta; Attendance: 100; Umpires: Chu Hsu-kuang (TPE) |

| Team | 1 | 2 | 3 | 4 | 5 | 6 | 7 | 8 | 9 | R | H | E |
|---|---|---|---|---|---|---|---|---|---|---|---|---|
| Thailand | 0 | 0 | 0 | 0 | 3 | 2 | 2 | 4 | 0 | 11 | 12 | 5 |
| Indonesia | 3 | 1 | 7 | 0 | 0 | 1 | 0 | 0 | X | 12 | 15 | 2 |

== Basketball ==
Summary

| Team | Event | Group Stage | | | | | Quarterfinal | Semifinals / Pl. | Final / BM / Pl. | |
| Team | Event | Opposition score | Opposition score | Opposition score | Opposition score | Rank | Opposition score | Opposition score | Opposition score | Rank |
|---|---|---|---|---|---|---|---|---|---|---|
| Indonesia men's | Men's tournament | —N/a | South Korea; L 65−104 | Thailand; W 98−86 | Mongolia; L 69−74 | 2 Q | China; L 63–98 | 5th–8th place semifinals Syria; L 66–76 | Seventh place game Japan; L 66–84 | 8 |
| Indonesia women's | Women's tournament | Korea; L 40−108 | Kazakhstan; L 73−85 | Chinese Taipei; L 51−115 | India; W 69−66 | 4 Q | China; L 37–141 | 5th–8th place semifinals Kazakhstan; L 65–93 | Seventh place game Mongolia; W 82–66 | 7 |
| Indonesia men's | Men's 3x3 tournament | Vietnam; W 21−8 | Thailand; L 15−17 | China; L 13−22 | Sri Lanka; W 18−12 | 3 | did not advance | | | |
| Indonesia women's | Women's 3x3 tournament | —N/a | Syria; W 16−15 | Sri Lanka; W 21−9 | South Korea; L 9−22 | 2 Q | Japan; L 6–15 | did not advance | | |

=== 5x5 basketball ===
Indonesia men's and women's basketball team entered the competition, drawn in group A for the men's and in group X for the women's.

==== Men's tournament ====
Roster

The following is the Indonesia roster in the men's basketball tournament of the 2018 Asian Games.

Indonesia men's national basketball team - 2018 Asian Games roster
Players
Coaches

| Pos. | No. | Name | Age – Date of birth | Height | Club | Ctr. |
|---|---|---|---|---|---|---|
| F | 3 | Kaleb Ramot Gemilang | 27 – 30 May 1991 | 1.84 m (6 ft 0 in) | CLS Knights | (Indonesia) |
| F | 4 | Abraham Damar Grahita | 22 – 8 October 1995 | 1.80 m (5 ft 11 in) | W.88 News Aspac | (Indonesia) |
| G | 7 | Andakara Prastawa | 25 – 16 August 1992 | 1.72 m (5 ft 8 in) | W.88 News Aspac | (Indonesia) |
| F | 9 | Sandy Febiansyakh Kurniawan | 32 – 19 February 1986 | 1.90 m (6 ft 3 in) | CLS Knights | (Indonesia) |
| F | 10 | Kevin Sitorus | 24 – 17 July 1994 | 1.96 m (6 ft 5 in) | Satria Muda Pertamina | (Indonesia) |
| F | 13 | Ponsianus Indrawan | 33 – 13 August 1985 | 1.91 m (6 ft 3 in) | Pelita Jaya | (Indonesia) |
| G | 30 | Xaverius Prawiro | 31 – 30 December 1986 | 1.81 m (5 ft 11 in) | Pelita Jaya | (Indonesia) |
| F | 23 | Valentino Wuwungan | 28 – 29 December 1989 | 1.93 m (6 ft 4 in) | Pelita Jaya | (Indonesia) |
| C | 12 | Muhammad Dhiya Ul'haq | 26 – 11 March 1992 | 2.03 m (6 ft 8 in) | Satria Muda Pertamina | (Indonesia) |
| F | 33 | Arki Dikania Wisnu (C) | 30 – 15 March 1988 | 1.87 m (6 ft 2 in) | Satria Muda Pertamina | (Indonesia) |
| C | 14 | Adhi Prasetyo Putra | 25 – 31 January 1993 | 1.94 m (6 ft 4 in) | Pelita Jaya | (Indonesia) |
| F | 71 | Jamarr Johnson (NP) | 30 – 20 June 1988 | 1.96 m (6 ft 5 in) | Satria Muda Pertamina | (Indonesia) |

Head coach

- (Indonesia) Fictor Roring

Legend

- (C) Team captain
- (NP) Naturalized player
- Club - describes last
  club before the tournament
- Age - describes age
  on 14 August 2018

Group A

| Pos | Team | Pld | W | L | PF | PA | PD | Pts | Qualification |
|---|---|---|---|---|---|---|---|---|---|
| 1 | South Korea | 3 | 3 | 0 | 329 | 215 | +114 | 6 | Quarterfinals |
| 2 | Indonesia | 3 | 1 | 2 | 232 | 264 | −32 | 4 (Note: Tied on head-to-head wins (1). Head-to-head game points difference: INA +7, MGL +4, THA −11.) | Quarterfinals |
| 3 | Mongolia | 3 | 1 | 2 | 233 | 264 | −31 | 4 | |
| 4 | Thailand | 3 | 1 | 2 | 250 | 301 | −51 | 4 | |

Source: OCA
Notes:

14 August
18:30

| Indonesia | 65–104 | South Korea |
Scoring by quarter: 18–28, 13–25, 14–27, 20–24
| Pts: Prastawa 20; Rebs: Johnson 8 Asts: Johnson 3 | | Pts: Ra 30; Rebs: Ra 19; Asts: Kim S. 7 |

Gelora Bung Karno Basketball Hall, Jakarta
Referees: Yuen Chun Yip (HKG), Hadi Salem (IRI), Anan Daraghma (PLE)

20 August
18:30

| Indonesia | 98–86 | Thailand |
Scoring by quarter: 30–29, 21–14, 21–23, 26–20
| Pts: Johnson 28; Rebs: Johnson 16; Asts: Grahita, Prastawa 3 | | Pts: Jaisanuk 28; Rebs: Ananti 7 Asts: Lakhan 5 |

Gelora Bung Karno Basketball Hall, Jakarta
Referees: Yuen Chun Yip (HKG), Mohammad Doust (IRI), Kumiko Kumagai (JPN)

25 August
18:30

| Mongolia | 74–69 | Indonesia |
Scoring by quarter: 14–18, 24–9, 21–23, 15–19
| Pts: Sanchir 28; Rebs: Bolortulga 11; Asts: Sergelen, Sanchir 4 | | Pts: Wuwungan, Wisnu 15; Rebs: Johnson 15; Asts: Johnson 4 |

Gelora Bung Karno Basketball Hall, Jakarta
Referees: Yuen Chun Yip (HKG), Hadi Salem (IRI), Chen Ying-cheng (TPE)

Quarter-final

27 August
18:30

| China | 98–63 | Indonesia |
Scoring by quarter: 26–13, 27–15, 27–16, 18–19
| Pts: Abdusalam 24; Rebs: Abdusalam 10; Asts: Fang, Zhao R., Sun 4 | | Pts: Johnson 20; Rebs: Johnson 9 Asts: Johnson 4 |

Gelora Bung Karno Basketball Hall, Jakarta
Referees: Mohammad Doust (IRI), Snehal Bendke (IND), Kim Jong-kuk (KOR)

Classification 5th–8th

28 August
18:30

| Syria | 76–66 | Indonesia |
Scoring by quarter: 26–15, 26–9, 14–17, 10–25
| Pts: Al-Jabi 33; Rebs: Al-Shaikh 11; Asts: Bakar, Al-Osh 4 | | Pts: Prawiro, Wisnu 14; Rebs: Johnson 7 Asts: Johnson 4 |

Gelora Bung Karno Basketball Hall, Jakarta
Referees: Hadi Salem (IRI), Alexey Stepanenko (KAZ), Imran Ali Baig (IND)

Seventh place game

31 August
12:30

| Japan | 84–66 | Indonesia |
Scoring by quarter: 21–20, 18–12, 18–22, 27–12
| Pts: Tsuji 29; Rebs: Ota 11; Asts: Harimoto 8 | | Pts: Johnson 23; Rebs: Johnson 12; Asts: Wisnu 6 |

Istora Gelora Bung Karno, Jakarta
Referees: Yuen Chun Yip (HKG), Kim Jong-kuk (KOR), Preeda Muongmee (THA)

==== Women's tournament ====
Roster

The following is the Indonesia roster in the women's basketball tournament of the 2018 Asian Games.

Indonesia women's national basketball team - 2018 Asian Games roster
Players
Coaches

| Pos. | No. | Name | Age – Date of birth | Height | Club | Ctr. |
|---|---|---|---|---|---|---|
| G | 5 | Ivonne Febriani Sinatra | 26 – 2 February 1992 | 1.73 m (5 ft 8 in) | Surabaya Fever | (Indonesia) |
| G | 7 | Kadek Pratita Citta Dewi | 23 – 13 August 1995 | 1.70 m (5 ft 7 in) | Merpati Bali | (Indonesia) |
| G/F | 8 | Natasha Debby Christaline | 24 – 26 November 1993 | 1.69 m (5 ft 7 in) | Surabaya Fever | (Indonesia) |
| F | 10 | Priscilla Annabel Karen | 22 – 29 May 1996 | 1.73 m (5 ft 8 in) | Tenaga Baru Pontianak | (Indonesia) |
| F | 11 | Dyah Lestari | 20 – 4 May 1998 | 1.79 m (5 ft 10 in) | Sahabat Semarang | (Indonesia) |
| G | 12 | Adelaide Callista Wongsohardjo | 16 – 12 October 2001 | 1.73 m (5 ft 8 in) | Bimasakti Malang | (Indonesia) |
| G | 13 | Christine Aldora Tjundawan | 19 – 22 August 1998 | 1.67 m (5 ft 6 in) | Tanago Friesian Jakarta | (Indonesia) |
| C | 15 | Vonny Hantoro | 22 – 15 July 1996 | 1.77 m (5 ft 10 in) | GMC Cirebon | (Indonesia) |
| G | 21 | Nathania Claresta Orville | 18 – 3 August 2000 | 1.65 m (5 ft 5 in) | Surabaya Fever | (Indonesia) |
| C | 22 | Gabriel Sophia | 26 – 22 November 1991 | 1.84 m (6 ft 0 in) | Surabaya Fever | (Indonesia) |
| G/F | 25 | Henny Sutjiono (C) | 24 – 2 February 1994 | 1.69 m (5 ft 7 in) | Surabaya Fever | (Indonesia) |
| F | 71 | Clarita Antonio | 19 – 1 July 1999 | 1.78 m (5 ft 10 in) | Surabaya Fever | (Indonesia) |

Head coach

- (Indonesia) Arif Gunarto

Legend

- (C) Team captain
- (NP) Naturalized player
- Club - describes last
  club before the tournament
- Age - describes age
  on 15 August 2018

Group X

| Pos | Team | Pld | W | L | PF | PA | PD | Pts | Qualification |
|---|---|---|---|---|---|---|---|---|---|
| 1 | Chinese Taipei | 4 | 4 | 0 | 358 | 239 | +119 | 8 | Quarterfinals |
| 2 | Korea | 4 | 3 | 1 | 382 | 238 | +144 | 7 | Quarterfinals |
| 3 | Kazakhstan | 4 | 2 | 2 | 263 | 291 | −28 | 6 | Quarterfinals |
| 4 | Indonesia | 4 | 1 | 3 | 233 | 374 | −141 | 5 | Quarterfinals |
| 5 | India | 4 | 0 | 4 | 242 | 336 | −94 | 4 | |

Source: OCA

15 August
18:30

| Korea | 108–40 | Indonesia |
Scoring by quarter: 25–8, 33–12, 21–9, 29–11
| Pts: Ro 22; Rebs: Ro 8 Asts: Kim S. 6 | | Pts: Christaline 17; Rebs: four players 4 Asts: Wongsohardjo, Sutjiono 2 |

Gelora Bung Karno Basketball Hall, Jakarta
Referees: Zhu Duan (CHN), Preeda Muongmee (THA), Jun Horiuchi (JPN)

19 August
18:30

| Indonesia | 73–85 | Kazakhstan |
Scoring by quarter: 14–18, 17–25, 13–23, 29–19
| Pts: Christaline 30; Rebs: Christaline 7 Asts: Tjundawan, Sutjiono 3 | | Pts: Kondrakova 18; Rebs: Kondrakova 9 Asts: Kurazova 7 |

Gelora Bung Karno Basketball Hall, Jakarta
Referees: Ferdinand Pascual (PHI), Cui Zhexiong (CHN), Jun Horiuchi (JPN)

21 August
18:30

| Indonesia | 51–115 | Chinese Taipei |
Scoring by quarter: 12–34, 12–32, 9–24, 18–25
| Pts: Christaline 16; Rebs: Orville 7 Asts: Christaline, Orville, Sutjiono 3 | | Pts: Huang L. 26; Rebs: Cheng 13; Asts: Huang F. 11 |

Gelora Bung Karno Basketball Hall, Jakarta
Referees: Mohammad Doust (IRI), Preeda Muongmee (THA), Anan Daraghma (PLE)

23 August
18:30

| India | 66–69 | Indonesia |
Scoring by quarter: 14–17, 15–14, 21–21, 16–17
| Pts: Nixon 18; Rebs: Jeena 17; Asts: Limaye 8 | | Pts: Christaline 21; Rebs: Gabriel 12; Asts: Tjundawan 6 |

Gelora Bung Karno Basketball Hall, Jakarta
Referees: Watcharin Padungratchadakit (THA), Jun Horiuchi (JPN), Cui Zhexiong (CHN)

Quarter-final

26 August
18:30

| China | 141–37 | Indonesia |
Scoring by quarter: 40–6, 29–7, 40–5, 32–19
| Pts: Li Yue. 25; Rebs: Li Yue. 10; Asts: Li Yua. 10 | | Pts: Christaline 10; Rebs: Gabriel 5 Asts: Christaline, Gabriel 3 |

Gelora Bung Karno Basketball Hall, Jakarta
Referees: Kim Jong-kuk (KOR), Preeda Muongmee (THA), Anan Daraghma (PLE)

Classification 5th–8th

28 August
12:30

| Kazakhstan | 93–65 | Indonesia |
Scoring by quarter: 27–14, 27–19, 15–17, 24–15
| Pts: Yagodkina 20; Rebs: Kurazova 10; Asts: Yagodkina 10 | | Pts: Christaline 17; Rebs: Tjundawan 6 Asts: Gabriel 4 |

Gelora Bung Karno Basketball Hall, Jakarta
Referees: Snehal Bendke (IND), Jun Horiuchi (JPN), Cui Zhexiong (CHN)

Seventh place game

31 August
10:00

| Mongolia | 66–82 | Indonesia |
Scoring by quarter: 6–14, 16–31, 22–17, 22–20
| Pts: Bayartsetseg 23; Rebs: Bulbul, Khulan, Enerel 5 Asts: Khulan 8 | | Pts: Christaline 37; Rebs: Gabriel 13; Asts: Gabriel, Sutjiono 7 |

Istora Gelora Bung Karno, Jakarta
Referees: Lee Ji-youn (KOR), Watcharin Padungratchadakit (THA), Cui Zhexiong (CHN)

=== 3x3 basketball ===
Indonesia national 3x3 team will participate in the Games. The men's team placed in pool B and the women's team in pool D based on the FIBA 3x3 federation ranking.

==== Men's tournament ====
Roster

The following is the Indonesia roster in the men's 3x3 basketball tournament of the 2018 Asian Games.

- Erick Jonathan Gosal
- Rivaldo Tandra Pangesthio
- Vincent Rivaldi Kosasih
- Agassi Yeshe Goantara

Pool A

| Pos | Team | Pld | W | L | PF | PA | PD | Qualification |
|---|---|---|---|---|---|---|---|---|
| 1 | China | 4 | 4 | 0 | 86 | 49 | +37 | Quarterfinals |
| 2 | Thailand | 4 | 3 | 1 | 74 | 53 | +21 | Quarterfinals |
| 3 | Indonesia | 4 | 2 | 2 | 67 | 59 | +8 | |
| 4 | Sri Lanka | 4 | 1 | 3 | 57 | 66 | −9 | |
| 5 | Vietnam | 4 | 0 | 4 | 28 | 85 | −57 | |

Source: OCA

21 August
15:20

| Vietnam | 8–21 | Indonesia |
| Pts: Nguyễn Q. 4 | | Pts: Kosasih 7 |

Gelora Bung Karno Tennis Center Court, Jakarta
Referees: Liu (MAS), Tan (SGP)

21 August
18:20

| Indonesia | 15–17 | Thailand |
| Pts: Pangesthio 5 | | Pts: Jakrawan 7 |

Gelora Bung Karno Tennis Center Court, Jakarta
Referees: Ho (HKG), Ibragimow (TKM)

24 August
18:10

| Indonesia | 13–22 | China |
| Pts: Gosal, Goantara, Kosasih 4 | | Pts: Xiao 10 |

Gelora Bung Karno Tennis Center Court, Jakarta
Referees: Ito (JPN), Rulyov (KAZ)

24 August
19:20

| Sri Lanka | 12–18 | Indonesia |
| Pts: Brent 7 | | Pts: Goantara 6 |

Gelora Bung Karno Tennis Center Court, Jakarta
Referees: Tan (SGP), Rulyov (KAZ)

==== Women's tournament ====
Roster

The following is the Indonesia roster in the women's 3x3 basketball tournament of the 2018 Asian Games.

- Christine Apriyani Rumambi
- Dewa Ayu Made Sriartha Kusuma
- Delaya Maria
- Ni Putu Eka Liana Febiananda

Pool D

| Pos | Team | Pld | W | L | PF | PA | PD | Qualification |
|---|---|---|---|---|---|---|---|---|
| 1 | South Korea | 3 | 3 | 0 | 59 | 32 | +27 | Quarterfinals |
| 2 | Indonesia | 3 | 2 | 1 | 46 | 46 | 0 | Quarterfinals |
| 3 | Sri Lanka | 3 | 1 | 2 | 32 | 54 | −22 | |
| 4 | Syria | 3 | 0 | 3 | 42 | 47 | −5 | |

Source: OCA

22 August
19:40

| Indonesia | 16–15 | Syria |
| Pts: Sriartha 8 | | Pts: Sulaiman 8 |

Gelora Bung Karno Tennis Center Court, Jakarta
Referees: Al-Harthi (OMA), Ito (JPN)

22 August
21:10

| Sri Lanka | 9–21 | Indonesia |
| Pts: Perera, Thathsarani 3 | | Pts: Febiananda 7 |

Gelora Bung Karno Tennis Center Court, Jakarta
Referees: Shi (CHN), Ho (HKG)

25 August
18:40

| Indonesia | 9–22 | South Korea |
| Pts: Sriartha 5 | | Pts: Kim J.Y. 10 |

Gelora Bung Karno Tennis Center Court, Jakarta
Referees: Rulyov (KAZ), Lim (MAS)

Quarter-final

26 August
15:30

| Japan | 15–6 | Indonesia |
| Pts: Okuyama, Mawuli 5 | | Pts: Apriyani 3 |

Gelora Bung Karno Tennis Center Court, Jakarta
Referees: Shi (CHN), Liu (MAS)

== Bowling ==
Men

| Athlete | Event | Block 1 | Block 2 | Total | Rank | Stepladder final 1 | Stepladder final 2 | Rank |
| Athlete | Event | Result | Result | Total | Rank | Opposition Result | Opposition Result | Rank |
|---|---|---|---|---|---|---|---|---|
| Ryan Lalisang | Masters | 1767 | 1853 | 3620 | 12 | did not advance | | |
| Hardy Rachmadian | Masters | 1819 | 1749 | 3568 | 15 | did not advance | | |
| Diwan Rezaldy Syahril; Fachry Ibnu Askar; Yeri Ramadona | Trios | 2041 | 2087 | 4128 | 11 | —N/a | | |
| Ryan Lalisang; Billy Muhammad Islam; Hardy Rachmadian | Trios | 2086 | 2104 | 4190 | 4 | —N/a | | |
| Ryan Lalisang; Billy Muhammad Islam; Hardy Rachmadian; Diwan Rezaldy Syahril; Fachry Ibnu Askar; Yeri Ramadona | Team of six | 4078 | 4042 | 8120 | 5 | —N/a | | |

Women

| Athlete | Event | Block 1 | Block 2 | Total | Rank | Stepladder final 1 | Stepladder final 2 | Rank |
| Athlete | Event | Result | Result | Total | Rank | Opposition Result | Opposition Result | Rank |
|---|---|---|---|---|---|---|---|---|
| Nadia Pramanik | Masters | 1772 | 1733 | 3505 | 15 | did not advance | | |
| Tannya Roumimper | Masters | 1812 | 1767 | 3579 | 13 | did not advance | | |
| Alisha Nabila; Putty Armein; Sharon Limansantoso | Trios | 1878 | 1976 | 3854 | 13 | —N/a | | |
| Aldila Indryati; Nadia Pramanik; Tannya Roumimper | Trios | 2045 | 1931 | 3976 | 8 | —N/a | | |
| Aldila Indryati; Nadia Pramanik; Tannya Roumimper; Alisha Nabila; Putty Armein; Sharon Limansantoso | Team of six | 3886 | 4064 | 7950 | 5 | —N/a | | |

== Boxing ==
Men

| Athlete | Event | Round of 32 | Round of 16 | Quarterfinals | Semifinals | Final | Rank |
| Athlete | Event | Opposition Result | Opposition Result | Opposition Result | Opposition Result | Opposition Result | Rank |
|---|---|---|---|---|---|---|---|
| Mario Blasius Kali | –49 kg | T Ranasinghe (SRI); W 5–0 | JBQ da Silva (TLS); W 5–0 | Wu ZL (CHN); L 0–5 | did not advance | | |
| Aldoms Suguro | –52 kg | Bye | JBN Ximenes (TLS); W 5–0 | J Latipov (UZB); L 1–4 | did not advance | | |
| Sunan Agung Amoragam | –56 kg | L Azizi (AFG); W 5–0 | S Abdullaev (KGZ); W 4–0 | J Al-Sudani (IRQ); W 4–1 | M Mirzakhalilov (UZB); L 0–5 | Did not advance | 3rd place, bronze medalist(s) |
| Farrand Papendang | –60 kg | Bye | Choi H-j (KOR); W 5–0 | R Juntrong (THA); L 0–5 | did not advance | | |
| Libertus Gha | –64 kg | D Wangdi (BHU); W 5–0 | D Narimatsu (JPN); L 0–5 | did not advance | | | |
| Sarohatua Lumbantobing | –69 kg | A Shymbergenov (KAZ); L 0–5 | did not advance | | | | |
| Brama Hendra Betaubun | –75 kg | Bye | Kim J-j (KOR); L 1–3 | did not advance | | | |

Women

| Athlete | Event | Round of 32 | Round of 16 | Quarterfinals | Semifinals | Final | Rank |
| Athlete | Event | Opposition Result | Opposition Result | Opposition Result | Opposition Result | Opposition Result | Rank |
|---|---|---|---|---|---|---|---|
| Aldriani Beatrichx Suguro | –51 kg | Lin Y-t (TPE); L 0–5 | did not advance | | | | |
| Christina Marwam Jembay | –57 kg | —N/a | Vương TV (VIE); L 1–4 | did not advance | | | |
| Huswatun Hasanah | –60 kg | —N/a | F Pupova (KGZ); W 5–0 | Pavitra (IND); W 3–2 | S Seesondee (THA); L 0–5 | Did not advance | 3rd place, bronze medalist(s) |

== Canoeing ==
=== Slalom ===
| Athlete | Event | Heats | | Semifinal | | Final | |
| Athlete | Event | Best | Rank | Time | Rank | Time | Rank |
|---|---|---|---|---|---|---|---|
| Nopriadi | Men's C-1 | 127.28 | 15 | did not advance | | | |
| Arifal | Men's K-1 | 97.36 | 12 Q | 130.98 | 13 Q | 108.96 | 7 |
| Chandra Destia Nugraha | Men's K-1 | 103.82 | 14 | did not advance | | | |
| Maryati | Women's C-1 | 216.93 | 11 | did not advance | | | |
| Reski Wahyuni | Women's C-1 | 138.05 | 7 Q | 316.24 | 9 Q | 141.69 | 6 |
| Sumita Kurnia | Women's K-1 | 116.32 | 8 Q | 124.45 | 6 Q | 148.80 | 7 |

=== Sprint ===
| Athlete | Event | Heats | | Semifinal | | Final | |
| Athlete | Event | Time | Rank | Time | Rank | Time | Rank |
|---|---|---|---|---|---|---|---|
| Anwar Tarra; Marjuki | Men's C-2 200 m | 41.221 | 2 QF | Bye | | 40.265 | 6 |
| Anwar Tarra; Dedi Saputra | Men's C-2 1000 m | —N/a | | | | 4:11.561 | 8 |
| Sutrisno | Men's K-1 200 m | 39.193 | 5 QS | 37.558 | 3 QF | 38.628 | 9 |
| Andri Sugiarto; Erik Saf | Men's K-2 1000 m | 3:44.905 | 4 QS | 3:38.309 | 3 QF | 3:46.437 | 8 |
| Gandie; Mugi Harjito; Tri Wahyu Buwono; Maizir Riyondra | Men's K-4 500 m | 1:31.862 | 4 QS | 1:29.859 | 1 QF | 1:32.125 | 6 |
| Riska Andriyani | Women's C-1 200 m | 50.461 | 1 QF | Bye | | 49.086 | 2nd place, silver medalist(s) |
| Riska Andriyani; Nurmeni | Women's C-2 500 m | —N/a | | | | 2:07.356 | 3rd place, bronze medalist(s) |
| Stevani Maysche Ibo | Women's K-1 200 m | 45.249 | 5 QS | 41.724 | 2 QF | 43.389 | 5 |
| Stevani Maysche Ibo | Women's K-1 500 m | —N/a | | | | 2:04.202 | 5 |
| Ririn Puji Astuti; Stevani Maysche Ibo; Masripah; Emiliana Deau | Women's K-4 500 m | —N/a | | | | 1:41.885 | 7 |

Qualification legend: QF=Final; QS=Semifinal

=== Traditional boat race ===
Men

| Athlete | Event | Heats | | Repechage | | Semifinals | | Final | |
| Athlete | Event | Time | Rank | Time | Rank | Time | Rank | Time | Rank |
|---|---|---|---|---|---|---|---|---|---|
| Mochamad Taufan Wijaya; Anwar Tarra; Sutrisno; Syahrul Saputra; Dedi Saputra; Muhammad Yunus Rustandi; Andri Agus Mulyana; Poliyansyah; Erwin David Monim; Marjuki; Yuda Firmansyah; Arpan; Spens Stuber Mehue; Medi Juana; Muhammad Fajar Faturahman; Rio Akbar | TBR 200 m | 51.871 | 2 SF | Bye | | 51.896 | 2 GF | 53.360 | 4 |
| Mochamad Taufan Wijaya; Anwar Tarra; Sutrisno; Syahrul Saputra; Dedi Saputra; Muhammad Yunus Rustandi; Andri Agus Mulyana; Poliyansyah; Erwin David Monim; Marjuki; Yuda Firmansyah; Arpan; Spens Stuber Mehue; Medi Juana; Muhammad Fajar Faturahman; Rio Akbar | TBR 500 m | 2:18.884 | 4 R | 2:19.674 | 1 SF | 2:14.768 | 2 GF | 2:15.727 | 3rd place, bronze medalist(s) |
| Mochamad Taufan Wijaya; Anwar Tarra; Sutrisno; Syahrul Saputra; Dedi Saputra; Muhammad Yunus Rustandi; Andri Agus Mulyana; Poliyansyah; Erwin David Monim; Marjuki; Yuda Firmansyah; Arpan; Spens Stuber Mehue; Medi Juana; Muhammad Fajar Faturahman; Rio Akbar | TBR 1000 m | 4:39.604 | 3 SF | Bye | | 4:37.891 | 1 GF | 4:34.947 | 2nd place, silver medalist(s) |

Women

| Athlete | Event | Heats | | Repechage | | Semifinals | | Final | |
| Athlete | Event | Time | Rank | Time | Rank | Time | Rank | Time | Rank |
|---|---|---|---|---|---|---|---|---|---|
| Ririn Puji Astuti; Since Lithasova Yom; Ramla B Fazriah Nurbayan; Alvonsina Monim; Stevani Maysche Ibo; Masripah; Shifa Garnika Nurkarim; Christina Kafolakari; Selvianti Devi Hidayat; Raudani Fitra; Astri Dwijayanti; Emiliana Deau; Aswiati; Riana Yulistrian; Risti Ardianti | TBR 200 m | 57.264 | 2 SF | Bye | | 56.065 | 1 GF | 56.817 | 2nd place, silver medalist(s) |
| Ririn Puji Astuti; Since Lithasova Yom; Ramla B Fazriah Nurbayan; Alvonsina Monim; Stevani Maysche Ibo; Masripah; Shifa Garnika Nurkarim; Christina Kafolakari; Selvianti Devi Hidayat; Raudani Fitra; Astri Dwijayanti; Emiliana Deau; Aswiati; Riana Yulistrian; Risti Ardianti | TBR 500 m | 2:27.331 | 1 SF | Bye | | 2:27.926 | 1 GF | 2:27.056 | 4 |

=== Canoe polo (demonstration) ===
| Athlete | Event | 1st round (qualification) | | 2nd round (loser pool) | | Semifinal | Final / BM | |
| Athlete | Event | Opposition Score | Rank | Opposition Score | Rank | Opposition Score | Opposition Score | Rank |
|---|---|---|---|---|---|---|---|---|
| Indonesia men's | Men's tournament | Iran (IRI): L 1–17; Malaysia (MAS): L 0–17; Singapore (SGP): L 0–16 | 4 | Hong Kong (HKG): W 11–1; Singapore (SGP): L 1–20; Thailand (THA): L 3–5 | 7 | did not advance | | |

== Contract bridge ==
Men

| Athlete | Event | Qualification | | Semifinal | | Final | |
| Athlete | Event | Point | Rank | Point | Rank | Point | Rank |
|---|---|---|---|---|---|---|---|
| Franky Steven Karwur; Jemmy Boyke Bojoh | Pair | 1621.5 | 8 Q | 1000.8 | 18 | did not advance | |
| Henky Lasut; Freddy Eddy Manoppo | Pair | 1477 | 15 Q | 1047.6 | 12 Q | 374 | 3rd place, bronze medalist(s) |
| Santoso Sie; Agus Kustrijanto | Pair | 1405.6 | 23 Q | 1009.2 | 17 | did not advance | |
| Santoso Sie; Agus Kustrijanto; Henky Lasut; Freddy Eddy Manoppo; Ronny Eltanto; Youberth Jefry Sumarauw | Team | 156.37 | 6 | did not advance | | | |

Women

| Athlete | Event | Qualification | | Semifinal | | Final | |
| Athlete | Event | Point | Rank | Point | Rank | Point | Rank |
|---|---|---|---|---|---|---|---|
| Rury Andhani; Conny Eufke Sumampouw | Pair | 857.4 | 9 Q | 750.9 | 7 Q | 350.2 | 6 |
| Fera Damayanti; Riantini | Pair | 857.4 | 10 Q | 729.1 | 11 Q | 346.2 | 8 |
| Nunung Tri Yulianti; Nettin Erinda | Pair | 827.7 | 15 Q | 777.9 | 3 Q | 314.2 | 12 |

Mixed

| Athlete | Event | Qualification | | Semifinal | | Final | |
| Athlete | Event | Point | Rank | Point | Rank | Point | Rank |
|---|---|---|---|---|---|---|---|
| Julita Grace Joice Tueje; Robert Parasian | Pair | 1304 | 3 Q | 725.1 | 9 Q | 318 | 10 |
| Lusje Olha Bojoh; Taufik Gautama Asbi | Pair | 1246.3 | 11 Q | 721.5 | 10 Q | 348 | 3rd place, bronze medalist(s) |
| Marcella Elvitta Chyntia Lasut; Bill Roland George Mondigir | Pair | 1199.1 | 14 Q | 669 | 14 | did not advance | |
| Lusje Olha Bojoh; Julita Grace Joice Tueje; Marcella Elvitta Chyntia Lasut; Robert Parasian; Taufik Gautama Asbi; Bill Roland George Mondigir | Team | 169.90 | 2 Q | China (CHN); L 87–121 | | Did not advance | 3rd place, bronze medalist(s) |
| Conny Eufke Sumampouw; Rury Andhani; Bert Toar Polii; Michael Bambang Hartono; Franky Steven Karwur; Jemmy Boyke Bojoh | Supermixed team | 109.33 | 3 Q | China (CHN); L 60–137 | | Did not advance | 3rd place, bronze medalist(s) |

== Cycling ==
=== BMX ===
| Athlete | Event | Seeding run | | Motos | | Final | |
| Athlete | Event | Time | Rank | Point | Rank | Time | Rank |
|---|---|---|---|---|---|---|---|
| I Gusti Bagus Saputra | Men's race | 35.81 | 3 | 6 | 2 Q | 34.314 | 2nd place, silver medalist(s) |
| Toni Syarifudin | Men's race | 35.94 | 4 | 8 | 3 Q | 36.761 | 5 |
| Wiji Lestari | Women's race | 40.12 | 3 | 6 | 2 Q | 40.788 | 3rd place, bronze medalist(s) |
| Cupi Nopianti | Women's race | 41.82 | 6 | 9 | 3 Q | 44.083 | 6 |

=== Mountain biking ===
Indonesia downhill bikers entered the competition with 4 athletes. Two men's athletes Popo Ario Sejati and Khoiful Muhkib was a national downhill champion, and for the women's athletes Nining Purwaningsih dan Tiara Andini Prastika was a second and third place at the 2017 Asian Mountain Biking Championships in Xuancheng, China.

| Athlete | Event | Seeding run | | Final | |
| Athlete | Event | Time | Rank | Time | Rank |
|---|---|---|---|---|---|
| Rafika Mokhamad Farisi | Men's cross-country | —N/a | | 1:41:41 | 9 |
| Chandra Rafsanzani | Men's cross-country | —N/a | | −2 laps | 13 |
| Noviana | Women's cross-country | —N/a | | −1 lap | 8 |
| Rohidah | Women's cross-country | —N/a | | 1:36:40 | 7 |
| Khoiful Mukhib | Men's downhill | 2:19.474 | 2 | 2:16.687 | 1st place, gold medalist(s) |
| Popo Ariyo Sejati | Men's downhill | 2:14.951 | 1 | DNF | |
| Nining Porwaningsih | Women's downhill | 2:40.781 | 2 | 2:42.664 | 3rd place, bronze medalist(s) |
| Tiara Andini Prastika | Women's downhill | 2:32.677 | 1 | 2:33.056 | 1st place, gold medalist(s) |

=== Road ===
| Athlete | Event | Final | |
| Athlete | Event | Time | Rank |
|---|---|---|---|
| Aiman Cahyadi | Men's road race | 3:26:01 | 9 |
| Jamal Hibatullah | Men's road race | 3:31:41 | 34 |
| Robin Manullang | Men's road race | 3:26:01 | 10 |
| Dadi Suryadi | Men's road race | 3:27:45 | 19 |
| Azizah Farchana | Women's road race | 3:02:38 | 15 |
| Yanthi Fuchianty | Women's road race | 3:05:01 | 16 |
| Aiman Cahyadi | Men's time trial | 59:36.23 | 7 |
| Yanthi Fuchianty | Women's time trial | 35:46.03 | 8 |

=== Track ===
Sprint

| Athlete | Event | Qualification | | Round of 32 | Round of 16 | Quarterfinals | Semifinals | Final | |
| Athlete | Event | Time | Rank | Opposition Time | Opposition Time | Opposition Time | Opposition Time | Opposition Time | Rank |
|---|---|---|---|---|---|---|---|---|---|
| Puguh Admadi | Men's sprint | 10.338 | 15 | R Singh (IND); W 10.981 | Xu C (CHN); L | did not advance | | | 15 |
| Ahmad Raditya | Men's sprint | 10.977 | 19 | S Ponomaryov (KAZ); L | did not advance | | | | 19 |
| Crismonita Dwi Putri | Women's sprint | 11.139 | 7 | —N/a | FS Adnan (MAS); W 11.606 | Lee H-j (KOR); L | did not advance | | 7 |

Team sprint

| Athlete | Event | Qualification | | Final | |
| Athlete | Event | Time | Rank | Opposition Time | Rank |
|---|---|---|---|---|---|
| Rio Akbar; Puguh Admadi; Terry Yudha Kusuma; Ahmad Raditya^{b} | Men's team sprint | 44.859 | 5 | did not advance | |
| Elga Kharisma Novanda; Crismonita Dwi Putri | Women's team sprint | 34.453 | 5 | did not advance | |

^{b} Riders who entered the competition but did not participating in any phase of the team event.
Qualification legend: FA=Gold medal final; FB=Bronze medal final

Pursuit

| Athlete | Event | Qualification | | Round 1 | | Final | |
| Athlete | Event | Time | Rank | Opposition Time | Rank | Opposition Time | Rank |
|---|---|---|---|---|---|---|---|
| Bernard Van Aert | Men's pursuit | 4:35.871 | 7 | —N/a | | did not advance | |
| Ayustina Delia Priatna | Women's pursuit | 3:43.387 | 3 FB | —N/a | | Huang T-y (TPE); L | 4 |
| Elan Riyadi; Bernard Van Aert; Nandra Eko Wahyudi; Robin Manullang; Aiman Cahyadi^{b} Projo Waseso^{b} | Men's team pursuit | 4:22.845 | 9 | did not advance | | | |

^{b} Riders who entered the competition but did not participating in any phase of the team event.
Qualification legend: FA=Gold medal final; FB=Bronze medal final

Keirin

| Athlete | Event | 1st Round | Repechage | 2nd Round | Final |
| Athlete | Event | Rank | Rank | Rank | Rank |
|---|---|---|---|---|---|
| Puguh Admadi | Men's keirin | 5 R | 2 Q | 6 FB | 10 |
| Terry Yudha Kusuma | Men's keirin | 5 R | 5 | did not advance | |
| Elga Kharisma Novanda | Women's keirin | 5 R | 2 Q | 5 FB | 11 |
| Crismonita Dwi Putri | Women's keirin | 1 Q | Bye | 4 FB | 7 |

Qualification legend: FA=Gold medal final; FB=Bronze medal final

Omnium

| Athlete | Event | Scratch race | | Tempo race | | Elimination race | | Points race | | Total points | Rank |
| Athlete | Event | Rank | Points | Rank | Points | Rank | Points | Rank | Points | Total points | Rank |
|---|---|---|---|---|---|---|---|---|---|---|---|
| Nandra Eko Wahyudi | Men's omnium | 17 | 8 | 15 | 12 | 6 | 30 | 10 | 4 | 54 | 14 |
| Ayustina Delia Priatna | Women's omnium | 10 | 22 | 9 | 24 | 8 | 26 | 1 | 34 | 106 | 6 |

Madison

| Athlete | Event | Points | Laps | Rank |
|---|---|---|---|---|
| Projo Waseso; Bernard Van Aert | Men's madison | −12 | −20 | 7 |
| Ayustina Delia Priatna; Liontin Evangelina Setiawan | Women's madison | −14 | −20 | 6 |

== Diving ==
Men

| Athlete | Event | Preliminary | | Final | |
| Athlete | Event | Score | Rank | Score | Rank |
|---|---|---|---|---|---|
| Aldinsyah Putra Rafi | 1 metre springboard | 321.35 | 8 | 278.75 | 9 |
| Tri Anggoro Priambodo | 1 metre springboard | 256.00 | 10 | 255.45 | 10 |
| Adityo Restu Putra | 3 metre springboard | 344.50 | 10 | 403.75 | 9 |
| Aldinsyah Putra Rafi | 3 metre springboard | 320.75 | 13 | did not advance | |
| Tri Anggoro Priambodo; Adityo Restu Putra | Synchronized 3 metre springboard | —N/a | —N/a | 318.48 | 7 |
| Adityo Restu Putra; Andriyan | Synchronized 10 metre platform | —N/a | —N/a | 372.57 | 4 |

Women

| Athlete | Event | Preliminary | | Final | |
| Athlete | Event | Score | Rank | Score | Rank |
|---|---|---|---|---|---|
| Eka Purnama Indah | 1 metre springboard | 196.80 | 11 | 222.35 | 9 |
| Della Dinarsari Harimurti | 1 metre springboard | 209.85 | 10 | 188.70 | 11 |
| Linadini Yasmin | 3 metre springboard | 203.20 | 10 | 205.05 | 10 |
| Maria Natalie Dinda Anasti | 3 metre springboard | 184.20 | 11 | 202.15 | 11 |
| Dewi Setyaningsih | 10 metre platform | 210.65 | 11 | 172.05 | 11 |
| Eka Purnama Indah; Maria Natalie Dinda Anasti | Synchronized 3 metre springboard | —N/a | —N/a | 230.46 | 7 |
| Dewi Setyaningsih; Della Dinarsari Harimurti | Synchronized 10 metre platform | —N/a | —N/a | 209.10 | 7 |

== Equestrian ==
Dressage

| Athlete | Horse | Event | Prix St-Georges | | Intermediate I | | Intermediate I Freestyle | |
| Athlete | Horse | Event | Score | Rank | Score | Rank | Score | Rank |
|---|---|---|---|---|---|---|---|---|
| Dara Prameswari | Commodore | Individual | 65.734 | 17 Q | 65.264 | 17 Q | 67.925 | 10 |
| Larasati Gading | Calaiza T | Individual | 69.146 | 6 Q | 66.793 | 10 Q | 66.715 | 11 |
| Nadya Zax | Bique-Bique Cedros | Individual | 63.175 # | 24 Q | 60.617 | 26 | did not advance | |
| Njoto Setiowati | Diamond Boy 8 | Individual | 64.940 | 20 Q | 60.970 | 25 | did not advance | |
| Dara Prameswari; Larasati Gading; Nadya Zax; Njoto Setiowati | See above | Team | 66.606 | 4 | —N/a | | | |

Eventing

| Athlete | Horse | Event | Dressage | | Cross-country | | | Jumping | | |
| Athlete | Horse | Event | Penalties | Rank | Penalties | Total | Rank | Penalties | Total | Rank |
|---|---|---|---|---|---|---|---|---|---|---|
| Riko Ganda Febryyanto | Lelis Blanch | Individual | 40.40 # | 30 | Eliminated | | | did not advance | | |
| Alfaro Menayang | All Right | Individual | 33.70 | 21 | Eliminated | | | did not advance | | |
| Steven Menayang | Riga | Individual | 34.50 | 25 | 25.60 | 60.10 | 19 Q | Withdrew | | |
| Jendry Palandeng | Donitri | Individual | 36.60 | 29 | 3.60 | 40.20 | 13 Q | 4.00 | 44.20 | 13 |
| Riko Ganda Febryyanto; Alfaro Menayang; Steven Menayang; Jendry Palandeng | See above | Team | 104.80 | 8 | | 1,100.30 | 7 | | 2,044.20 | 8 |

Jumping

| Athlete | Horse | Event | Qualification | | Qualifier 1 | | | Qualifier 2 Team Final | | | Final round A | | | Final round B | | |
| Athlete | Horse | Event | Points | Rank | Penalties | Total | Rank | Penalties | Total | Rank | Penalties | Total | Rank | Penalties | Total | Rank |
|---|---|---|---|---|---|---|---|---|---|---|---|---|---|---|---|---|
| Yanyan Hadiansah | Bodius | Individual | 21.39 | 60 | 36 # | 57.39 | 61 | did not advance | | | | | | | | |
| Ferry Wahyu Hadiyanto | Faults Free | Individual | 12.07 | 46 | 0 | 12.07 | 23 Q | 0 | 12.07 | 19 Q | 22 | 34.07 | 24 Q | 9 | 43.07 | 19 |
| Raymen Kaunang | Conquistador | Individual | Eliminated | | 13 | 56.85 | 60 | did not advance | | | | | | | | |
| Kurniadi Mustopo | Capri's Pearl | Individual | 10.78 | 42 | 9 | 19.78 | 41 Q | 8 | 27.78 | 38 Q | 19 | 46.78 | 35 | did not advance | | |
| Raymen Kaunang; Yanyan Hadiansah; Kurniadi Mustopo; Ferry Wahyu Hadiyanto | See above | Team | 44.24 | 15 | 22 | 66.24 | 13 | did not advance | | | —N/a | | | | | |

1. – indicates that the score of this rider does not count in the team competition, since only the best three results of a team are counted.

== Esports (demonstration) ==
Arena of Valor and Clash Royale

| Athlete | ID | Event | Round 1 | Round 2 | Round 3 | Loser round 1 | Loser round 2 | Loser round 3 | Semifinal | Final | |
| Athlete | ID | Event | Opposition score | Opposition score | Opposition score | Opposition score | Opposition score | Opposition score | Opposition score | Opposition score | Rank |
|---|---|---|---|---|---|---|---|---|---|---|---|
| Glen Richard; Hartawan Muliadi; Muhammad Ahmad; Farhan Akbari; Ilham Bahrul; Franky Ansen^{R} | Kurus; Yay WyvorZ; Ahmad; Hanss; Uugajah; Easy | Arena of Valor | Chinese Taipei; L 0–2 | did not advance | | Thailand; L 1–2 | did not advance | | | | |
| Ridel Yesaya Sumarandak | BenZer Ridel | Clash Royale | China; W 3–1 | Hong Kong; W 3–1 | Vietnam; W 3–2 | Bye | | | | China; W 3–1 | 1st place, gold medalist(s) |

Hearthstone and StarCraft II

| Athlete | ID | Event | Quarterfinals | Semifinals | Final / BM | |
| Athlete | ID | Event | Opposition score | Opposition score | Opposition score | Rank |
|---|---|---|---|---|---|---|
| Hendry Koentarto Handisurya | Jothree | Hearthstone | Thailand; W 3–1 | Vietnam; W 3–2 | Hong Kong; L 1–3 | 2nd place, silver medalist(s) |
| Nyoman Arie Pranasakti | Jaquelton | StarCraft II | Iran; L 0–3 | did not advance | | |

League of Legends and Pro Evolution Soccer

| Athlete | ID | Event | Group stage | | Semifinals | Final / BM | |
| Athlete | ID | Event | Oppositions scores | Rank | Opposition score | Opposition score | Rank |
|---|---|---|---|---|---|---|---|
| Malik Abdul Aziz; Felix Chandra; Ericko Timotius Lim; Ruly Sandra Sutanto; Peter Tjahjadi; Gerry Arisena; Bayu Putera Sentosa | Fake Friends; Fong; Soapking; Whynuts; Airliur; Potato; Cruzher | League of Legends | Chinese Taipei: L 0–2; Pakistan: L 0–2; Saudi Arabia: L 0–2 | 4 | did not advance | | |
| Setia Widianto; Elga Cahya Putra | | Pro Evolution Soccer | Japan: L 0–2; India: W 2–0; Vietnam: L 0–2 | 3 | did not advance | | |

== Fencing ==
Individual

| Athlete | Event | Preliminary | | Round of 32 | Round of 16 | Quarterfinals | Semifinals | Final | |
| Athlete | Event | Opposition score | Rank | Opposition score | Opposition score | Opposition score | Opposition score | Opposition score | Rank |
|---|---|---|---|---|---|---|---|---|---|
| Ryan Pratama | Men's épée | M Mirzaei (QAT): W 5–3; K Baudunov (KGZ): L 3–5; R Kurbanov (KAZ): L 2–5; Ho WH (HKG): L 2–5; K Minobe (JPN): L 3–5 | 4 Q | K Minobe (JPN); L 8–15 | did not advance | | | | 26 |
| Derry Renanda Putra Siahaan | Men's épée | O Sokolov (UZB): L 3–5; D Alexanin (KAZ): L 2–5; Nguyễn PĐ (VIE): L 2–5; A Saeeduddin (PAK): W 5–2; Koh IJ (MAS): L 1–5; B Batkhüü (MGL): W 5–1 | 5 Q | Park S-y (KOR); L 0–15 | did not advance | | | | 23 |
| Dennis Ariadinata Satriana | Men's foil | C Mayakarn (THA): W 5–3; Nguyễn MQ (VIE): L 2–5; Cheung KL (HKG): L 1–5; N Perez (PHI): L 2–5 | 4 Q | H Yoong (MAS); W 15–8 | Cheung KL (HKG); L 4–15 | did not advance | | | 15 |
| Mohammad Zulfikar | Men's foil | Son Y-k (KOR): L 2–5; H Yoong (MAS): L 3–5; T Saito (JPN): L 1–5; A Owaida (QAT): W 5–1; S Lama (NEP): W 5–0 | 4 Q | N Perez (PHI); L 10–15 | did not advance | | | | 20 |
| Hendri Eko Budianto | Men's sabre | I Mokretsov (KAZ): L 0–5; Oh S-u (KOR): L 2–5; Wang S (CHN): L 1–5; V Srinualnad (THA): L 4–5 | 5 | did not advance | | | | | 19 |
| Indra Agus Setiawan | Men's sabre | Lam HC (HKG): W 5–3; A Salmanpoor (QAT): W 5–4; Nguyễn XL (VIE): L 4–5; K Yoshida (JPN): W 5–4; A Pakdaman (IRI): L 3–5 | 2 Q | Bye | Vũ TA (VIE); L 9–15 | did not advance | | | 10 |
| Megawati | Women's épée | K Oishi (JPN): L 2–5; Kang Y-m (KOR): L 4–5; Trần TTT (VIE): L 3–5; N Salameh (LBN): L 4–5; JS Singh (IND): L 3–5 | 6 | did not advance | | | | | 27 |
| Anis Riyati | Women's épée | A Alibekova (KAZ): L 1–5; Sun YW (CHN): L 2–5; KA Khamitova (KGZ): L 2–5; C Lim (SGP): L 2–4; Goh BH (MAS): L 2–5 | 6 | did not advance | | | | | 29 |
| Nurul Aini | Women's foil | Jeon H-s (KOR): L 0–5; Ho PI (MAC): L 4–5; Liu YW (HKG): L 4–5; M Shaito (LBN): L 1–5; L Al-Hosani (UAE): W 5–2; Cheng H (TPE): L 4–5 | 6 | did not advance | | | | | 21 |
| Mery Ananda | Women's foil | A Berthier (SGP): L 0–5; Huo XX (CHN): L 1–5; T Fong (MAS): W 5–0; S Azuma (JPN): L 1–5; MI Esteban (PHI): L 4–5 | 4 Q | Nam H-h (KOR); L 12–15 | did not advance | | | | 19 |
| Gebhy Novitha | Women's sabre | Kim J-y (KOR): L 3–5; N Sazanjian (IRI): W 5–3; T Pokeaw (THA): L 0–5; T Pochekutova (KAZ): L 1–5 | 5 | did not advance | | | | | 18 |
| Diah Permatasari | Women's sabre | R Thapa (NEP): W 5–0; F Rafiei (IRI): W 5–3; S Fukushima (JPN): L 3–5; Yoon J-s (KOR): L 3–5; C Linly (CAM): W 5–4 | 3 Q | Bye | N Sazanjian (IRI); W 15–11 | Qian JR (CHN); L 11–15 | did not advance | | 8 |

Team

| Athlete | Event | Round of 16 | Quarterfinals | Semifinals | Final | |
| Athlete | Event | Opposition score | Opposition score | Opposition score | Opposition score | Rank |
|---|---|---|---|---|---|---|
| Muhammad Fajri; Ryan Pratama; Derry Renanda Putra Siahaan; Iqbal Tawakal | Men's épée | Uzbekistan (UZB); L 35–45 | did not advance | | | 11 |
| Muhammad Fatah Prassetyo; Dennis Ariadinata Satriana; Ihsan Ariesda Solihin; Mohammad Zulfikar | Men's foil | Thailand (THA); W 45–40 | Hong Kong (HKG); L 11–45 | did not advance | | 8 |
| Hendri Eko Budianto; Mochammad Nizar Fardhani; Zuhdi Muhammad; Indra Agus Setiawan | Men's sabre | Qatar (QAT); W 45–27 | Iran (IRI); L 21–45 | did not advance | | 7 |
| Aisyah Elizabeth; Megawati; Anis Riyati; Sutrisni | Women's épée | India (IND); L 24–45 | did not advance | | | 11 |
| Nurul Aini; Mery Ananda; Voryn Thalya Kiriwenno; Leoda Lundy Winona | Women's foil | Philippines (PHI); L 19–45 | did not advance | | | 10 |
| Gebhy Novitha; Diah Permatasari; Ima Sapitri; Agustin Dwi Damayanti | Women's sabre | Bye | Japan (JPN); L 22–45 | did not advance | | 7 |

== Field hockey ==
As the host nation, Indonesia was given a spot to compete in both men's and women's tournaments, both teams were placed in the group A and B respectively.

Summary

| Team | Event | Group Stage | | | | | | Semifinal | Final / BM / Pl. | |
| Team | Event | Opposition Score | Opposition Score | Opposition Score | Opposition Score | Opposition Score | Rank | Opposition Score | Opposition Score | Rank |
|---|---|---|---|---|---|---|---|---|---|---|
| Indonesia men's | Men's tournament | India; L 0–17 | Japan; L 1–3 | South Korea; L 0–15 | Sri Lanka; L 1–3 | Hong Kong; W 3–2 | 5 | Did not advance | Thailand; L 1–2 | 10 |
| Indonesia women's | Women's tournament | India; L 0–8 | South Korea; L 0–5 | Kazakhstan; W 2–1 | Thailand; L 0–2 | —N/a | 4 | Did not advance | Chinese Taipei; W 2–0 | 7 |

=== Men's tournament ===
Roster

The following is the Indonesia roster in the men's field hockey tournament of the 2018 Asian Games.

Head coach: (Malaysia) Lim Chow Chuan

1. Wahid Hakim
2. Sadli Septiansyah
4. Nanda Rahman
5. Daarul Quthni
6. Iexy Kristianto
7. Richard Aunalal
11. Ardam
14. Hendri Mulia
15. Alfandy Prastyo
17. Jerry Efendi
18. Budi Romansyah (C)
21. Bara Audah
22. Astri Rahmad
23. Aulia Al Ardh
24. Gamma Rahmatullah
25. Ahmad Hikmat (GK)
29. Dea Dwi Permana (GK)
32. Haris Siregar

Pool A

| Pos | Team | Pld | W | D | L | PF | PA | PD | Pts | Qualification |
|---|---|---|---|---|---|---|---|---|---|---|
| 1 | India | 5 | 5 | 0 | 0 | 76 | 3 | +73 | 15 | Semi-finals |
| 2 | Japan | 5 | 4 | 0 | 1 | 30 | 11 | +19 | 12 | Semi-finals |
| 3 | South Korea | 5 | 3 | 0 | 2 | 39 | 8 | +31 | 9 | Fifth place game |
| 4 | Sri Lanka | 5 | 2 | 0 | 3 | 7 | 41 | −34 | 6 | Seventh place game |
| 5 | Indonesia (H) | 5 | 1 | 0 | 4 | 5 | 40 | −35 | 3 | Ninth place game |
| 6 | Hong Kong | 5 | 0 | 0 | 5 | 3 | 57 | −54 | 0 | Eleventh place game |

Source: FIH
Rules for classification: 1) points; 2) goal difference; 3) goals scored; 4) head-to-head result.
(H) Hosts

20 August 2018
20:00

| India | 17–0 | Indonesia |
|---|---|---|
| Rupinder 1', 3'; Dilpreet 7', 30', 32'; Akashdeep 10'; Simranjeet 13', 38', 53'; S. V. Sunil 25'; Prasad 27'; Mandeep 30', 45', 49'; Harmanpreet 31'; Lalit 45'; Amit 54' | Report |

Umpires:
Narongtuch Subboonsung (THA)
Hafiz Atif Latif (PAK)

22 August 2018
18:00

| Indonesia | 1–3 | Japan |
|---|---|---|
| Rahmad 18' | Report | Zendana 14'; Murata 43'; Ke. Tanaka 49' |

Umpires:
Salim Lucky (BAN)
Ilanggo Kanabathu (MAS)

24 August 2018
14:00

| Indonesia | 0–15 | South Korea |
|---|---|---|
| | Report | Kim J-h 9', 35', 56'; Jang J 9', 30', 45'; Jung M 20', 46', 59'; Seo I 25', 58', 59'; Rim J 49'; Yang J 54'; Kim S-k 56' |

Umpires:
Narongtuch Subboonsung (THA)
Hafiz Atif Latif (PAK)

26 August 2018
10:00

| Sri Lanka | 3–1 | Indonesia |
|---|---|---|
| Sudusinghe 24'; Ranasinghe 42', 54' | Report | Hakim 38' |

Umpires:
Ilanggo Kanabathu (MAS)
Salim Lucky (BAN)

28 August 2018
10:00

| Hong Kong | 2–3 | Indonesia |
|---|---|---|
| Siu 26'; Tsoi 60' | Report | Prastyo 13'; Aunalal 39'; Ardam 41' |

Umpires:
Hafiz Atif Latif (PAK)
Salim Lucky (BAN)

Ninth place game

30 August 2018
12:30

| Indonesia | 1–2 | Thailand |
|---|---|---|
| Prastyo 18' | Report | Kampanthong 23'; Boon-Art 28' |

Umpires:
Raghu Prasad (IND)
Salim Lucky (BAN)

=== Women's tournament ===
Roster

The following is the Indonesia roster in the women's field hockey tournament of the 2018 Asian Games.

Head coach: (Malaysia) Lim Chiow Chuan

1. Selly Florentina (GK)
2. Irianti Ratnaningsih
5. Tiffani Makharti
7. Lispa
8. Yuanita Suwito
9. Masriana
10. Nur Anisa
11. Ira Juarsyi
12. Rwede Sawor
13. Diana Nazar
14. Melinda
15. Sismiya Kadarisma
17. Annur El-Islamy
22. Aulia Arindah
23. Feriana (C)
25. Olevia Kbarek
28. Rayhan Uno
30. Sarah Amaniah (GK)

Pool B

| Pos | Team | Pld | W | D | L | PF | PA | PD | Pts | Qualification |
|---|---|---|---|---|---|---|---|---|---|---|
| 1 | India | 4 | 4 | 0 | 0 | 38 | 1 | +37 | 12 | Semifinals |
| 2 | South Korea | 4 | 3 | 0 | 1 | 17 | 4 | +13 | 9 | Semifinals |
| 3 | Thailand | 4 | 1 | 0 | 3 | 3 | 11 | −8 | 3 | 5th place game |
| 4 | Indonesia (H) | 4 | 1 | 0 | 3 | 2 | 16 | −14 | 3 | 7th place game |
| 5 | Kazakhstan | 4 | 1 | 0 | 3 | 4 | 32 | −28 | 3 | 9th place game |

Source: FIH
Rules for classification: 1) points; 2) goal difference; 3) goals scored; 4) head-to-head result.
(H) Hosts

19 August 2018
20:00

| India | 8–0 | Indonesia |
|---|---|---|
| Udita 9'; Katariya 14', 28'; Gurjit 17', 22', 57'; Lalremsiami 25'; Navneet 50' | Report |

Umpires:
Chieko Soma (JPN)
Chen Mei-chen (TPE)

21 August 2018
18:00

| South Korea | 5–0 | Indonesia |
|---|---|---|
| Kim B. 8'; Cho E. 17'; Cheon 22'; Lee Yu-rim 53'; Lee Yo. 57' | Report |

Umpires:
Nur Hafizah Azman (MAS)
Chen Jianjun (CHN)

23 August 2018
14:00

| Kazakhstan | 1–2 | Indonesia |
|---|---|---|
| Sazontova 6' | Report | Suwito 59'; El Islany 60' |

Umpires:
Chieko Soma (JPN)
Chen Jianjun (CHN)

25 August 2018
16:00

| Indonesia | 0–2 | Thailand |
|---|---|---|
| | Report | Sakunpithak 26', 41' |

Umpires:
Nur Hafizah Azman (MAS)
Junko Wagatsuma (JPN)

Seventh place game

29 August 2018
12:30

| Chinese Taipei | 0–2 | Indonesia |
|---|---|---|
| | Report | Arindah 21'; Suwito 41' |

Umpires:
Nur Hafizah Azman (MAS)
Ornpimol Kittiteerasopon (THA)

== Football ==
As the host nation, Indonesia men's and women's team were drawn in Group A respectively.

Summary

| Team | Event | Group Stage | | | | | Round of 16 | Quarterfinal | Semifinal | Final / BM | |
| Team | Event | Opposition Score | Opposition Score | Opposition Score | Opposition Score | Rank | Opposition Score | Opposition Score | Opposition Score | Opposition Score | Rank |
|---|---|---|---|---|---|---|---|---|---|---|---|
| Indonesia men's | Men's tournament | Chinese Taipei; W 4–0 | Palestine; L 1–2 | Laos; W 3–0 | Hong Kong; W 3–1 | 1 Q | United Arab Emirates; L 2–2 PSO 3–4 | did not advance | | | 10 |
| Indonesia women's | Women's tournament | —N/a | Maldives; W 6–0 | Chinese Taipei; L 0–4 | South Korea; L 0–12 | 3 | —N/a | did not advance | | | 9 |

=== Men's tournament ===
Roster

The following is Indonesia's 20-man squad for the men's football tournament of the 2018 Asian Games, officially named on 10 August.

Head coach: (Spain) Luis Milla

| No. | Pos. | Player | Date of birth (age) | Caps | Goals | Club |
|---|---|---|---|---|---|---|
| 1 | GK | Awan Setho | 20 March 1997 (aged 21) | 0 | 0 | (Football Association of Indonesia) Bhayangkara |
| 12 | GK | Andritany Ardhiyasa* | 26 December 1991 (aged 26) | 1 | 0 | (Football Association of Indonesia) Persija Jakarta |
| 2 | DF | Putu Gede | 7 June 1995 (aged 23) | 1 | 0 | (Football Association of Indonesia) Bhayangkara |
| 3 | DF | Andy Setyo | 16 September 1997 (aged 20) | 0 | 0 | (Football Association of Indonesia) PS TIRA |
| 5 | DF | Bagas Adi | 8 March 1997 (aged 21) | 0 | 0 | (Football Association of Indonesia) Arema |
| 7 | DF | Rezaldi Hehanusa | 7 November 1995 (aged 22) | 1 | 0 | (Football Association of Indonesia) Persija Jakarta |
| 11 | DF | Gavin Kwan Adsit | 5 April 1996 (aged 22) | 0 | 0 | (Football Association of Indonesia) Barito Putera |
| 15 | DF | Ricky Fajrin | 6 September 1995 (aged 22) | 1 | 0 | (Football Association of Indonesia) Bali United |
| 16 | DF | Hansamu Yama (captain) | 16 January 1995 (aged 23) | 1 | 0 | (Football Association of Indonesia) Barito Putera |
| 4 | MF | Zulfiandi | 17 July 1995 (aged 23) | 1 | 0 | (Football Association of Indonesia) Sriwijaya |
| 6 | MF | Evan Dimas | 13 March 1995 (aged 23) | 1 | 0 | (Football Association of Malaysia) Selangor |
| 8 | MF | Muhammad Hargianto | 24 July 1996 (aged 22) | 1 | 1 | (Football Association of Indonesia) Bhayangkara |
| 19 | MF | Hanif Sjahbandi | 7 April 1997 (aged 21) | 0 | 0 | (Football Association of Indonesia) Arema |
| 9 | FW | Beto Gonçalves* | 31 December 1980 (aged 37) | 1 | 1 | (Football Association of Indonesia) Sriwijaya |
| 10 | FW | Stefano Lilipaly* | 10 January 1990 (aged 28) | 1 | 2 | (Football Association of Indonesia) Bali United |
| 13 | FW | Febri Hariyadi | 19 February 1996 (aged 22) | 1 | 0 | (Football Association of Indonesia) Persib Bandung |
| 14 | FW | Septian David | 2 September 1996 (aged 21) | 0 | 0 | (Football Association of Indonesia) Mitra Kukar |
| 17 | FW | Saddil Ramdani | 2 January 1999 (aged 19) | 1 | 0 | (Football Association of Indonesia) Persela Lamongan |
| 18 | FW | Irfan Jaya | 1 May 1996 (aged 22) | 1 | 0 | (Football Association of Indonesia) Persebaya Surabaya |
| 20 | FW | Ilham Armaiyn | 10 May 1996 (aged 22) | 1 | 0 | (Football Association of Malaysia) Selangor |

* Over-aged player.

Group A

| Pos | Team | Pld | W | D | L | GF | GA | GD | Pts | Qualification |
|---|---|---|---|---|---|---|---|---|---|---|
| 1 | Indonesia (H) | 4 | 3 | 0 | 1 | 11 | 3 | +8 | 9 | Advance to knockout stage |
| 2 | Palestine | 4 | 2 | 2 | 0 | 5 | 3 | +2 | 8 | Advance to knockout stage |
| 3 | Hong Kong | 4 | 2 | 1 | 1 | 9 | 5 | +4 | 7 | Advance to knockout stage |
| 4 | Laos | 4 | 1 | 0 | 3 | 4 | 8 | −4 | 3 | |
| 5 | Chinese Taipei | 4 | 0 | 1 | 3 | 0 | 10 | −10 | 1 | |

Source: Asian Games 2018
Rules for classification: Group stage tiebreakers
(H) Hosts
12 August 2018
19:00 UTC+7

| Chinese Taipei | 0–4 | Indonesia |
|---|---|---|
| | Report | Lilipaly 67', 76'; Beto 71'; Hargianto 90+3' |

Patriot Candrabhaga Stadium, Bekasi
Referee: Ammar Mahfoodh (Bahrain)

15 August 2018
19:00 UTC+7

| Indonesia | 1–2 | Palestine |
|---|---|---|
| Irfan 23' | Report | Dabbagh 16'; Darwish 51' |

Patriot Candrabhaga Stadium, Bekasi
Referee: Nivon Robesh Gamini (Sri Lanka)

17 August 2018
19:00 UTC+7

| Laos | 0–3 | Indonesia |
|---|---|---|
| | Report | Beto 14', 47'; Ricky 75' |

Patriot Candrabhaga Stadium, Bekasi
Referee: Zaid Thamer Mohammed (Iraq)

20 August 2018
19:00 UTC+7

| Indonesia | 3–1 | Hong Kong |
|---|---|---|
| Irfan 46'; Lilipaly 85'; Hanif 90+4' | Report | Lau Hok Ming 39' |

Patriot Candrabhaga Stadium, Bekasi
Referee: Aziz Asimov (Uzbekistan)

Round of 16

24 August 2018
16:00 UTC+7

| Indonesia | 2–2 (a.e.t.) | United Arab Emirates |
|---|---|---|
| Beto 52'; Lilipaly 90+5' | Report | Z. Al-Ameri 20' (pen.), 65' (pen.) |
Penalties
| Lilipaly (penalty scored); Septian (penalty missed); Beto (penalty scored); Saddil (penalty missed); Hargianto (penalty scored) | 3–4 | (penalty scored) Al-Attas; (penalty scored) Z. Al-Ameri; (penalty scored) Ibrahim; (penalty missed) Ghanem; (penalty scored) Omar |

Wibawa Mukti Stadium, Cikarang
Referee: Shaun Evans (Australia)

=== Women's tournament ===
Roster

The following is the Indonesia squad in the women's football tournament of the 2018 Asian Games.

Head Coach: Ijatna Satia Bagda

| No. | Pos. | Player | Date of birth (age) | Caps | Goals | Club |
|---|---|---|---|---|---|---|
| 1 | GK | Norffince Boma | 26 April 1995 (aged 23) | | | (Football Association of Indonesia) Galanita Papua |
| 20 | GK | Vera Lestari | 17 January 1995 (aged 23) | | | (Football Association of Indonesia) NPS FC Surabaya |
| 2 | DF | Safira Kartini | 21 April 2003 (aged 15) | | | (Football Association of Indonesia) Galanita Babel |
| 3 | DF | Vivi Riski | 7 March 1997 (aged 21) | | | (Football Association of Indonesia) Galanita Babel |
| 4 | DF | Ade Mustikiana | 3 October 1999 (aged 18) | | | (Football Association of Indonesia) Galanita Babel |
| 12 | DF | Rizky Amalia Putri | 4 May 2000 (aged 18) | | | (Football Association of Indonesia) NPS FC Surabaya |
| 13 | DF | Nurlaili Khomariyah | 7 June 1996 (aged 22) | | | (Football Association of Indonesia) NPS FC Surabaya |
| 14 | DF | Rahma Wulan Aprilita | 22 April 1996 (aged 22) | | | (Football Association of Indonesia) Jaya Kencana Angels |
| 16 | DF | Jesella Arifya Sari | 6 March 2002 (aged 16) | | | (Football Association of Indonesia) Banteng Muda Malang |
| 5 | MF | Tia Darti Septiawati | 24 September 1993 (aged 24) | | | (Football Association of Indonesia) Banteng Muda Malang |
| 6 | MF | Maulina Novryliani | 14 November 1987 (aged 30) | | | (Football Association of Indonesia) Kebumen United Angels |
| 7 | MF | Yudith Herlina Sada | 15 December 1990 (aged 27) | | | (Football Association of Indonesia) Galanita Papua |
| 8 | MF | Rani Mulyasari | 4 March 1993 (aged 25) | | | (Football Association of Indonesia) UPI Bandung |
| 10 | MF | Dhanielle Daphne | 20 April 2000 (aged 18) | | | (Football Association of Indonesia) Galanita Jabar |
| 11 | MF | Zahra Musdalifah | 4 April 2001 (aged 17) | | | (Football Association of Indonesia) Galanita Banten |
| 15 | MF | Dwie Aprilliani | 26 April 1991 (aged 27) | | | (Football Association of Indonesia) Pansa FC Bantul |
| 17 | MF | Susi Susanti | 22 August 1990 (aged 27) | | | (Football Association of Indonesia) Jaya Kencana Angels |
| 18 | MF | Syenida Meryfandia | 16 March 1996 (aged 22) | | | (Football Association of Indonesia) Jaya Kencana Angels |
| 9 | FW | Mayang Zp | 16 July 1993 (aged 25) | | | (Football Association of Malaysia) Selangor |
| 19 | FW | Tugiyati Cindy | 21 July 1985 (aged 33) | | | (Football Association of Indonesia) Banteng Muda Malang |

Group A

| Pos | Team | Pld | W | D | L | GF | GA | GD | Pts | Qualification |
|---|---|---|---|---|---|---|---|---|---|---|
| 1 | South Korea | 3 | 3 | 0 | 0 | 22 | 1 | +21 | 9 | Advance to Knockout stage |
| 2 | Chinese Taipei | 3 | 2 | 0 | 1 | 12 | 2 | +10 | 6 | Advance to Knockout stage |
| 3 | Indonesia (H) | 3 | 1 | 0 | 2 | 6 | 16 | −10 | 3 | |
| 4 | Maldives | 3 | 0 | 0 | 3 | 0 | 21 | −21 | 0 | |

Source: Asian Games 2018
Rules for classification: Group stage tiebreakers
(H) Hosts
16 August 2018
18:30 UTC+7

| Indonesia | 6–0 | Maldives |
|---|---|---|
| Musdalifah 10', 72'; Zp 15' (pen.), 55'; Sada 30'; Sari 61' | Report |

Gelora Sriwijaya Stadium, Palembang
Referee: Thein Thein Aye (Myanmar)

19 August 2018
18:30 UTC+7

| Chinese Taipei | 4–0 | Indonesia |
|---|---|---|
| Yu Hsiu-chin 5'; Chan Pi-han 16'; Lin Ya-han 33'; Michelle Pao 39' | Report |

Gelora Sriwijaya Stadium, Palembang
Referee: Asaka Matsushita (Japan)

21 August 2018
18:30 UTC+7

| Indonesia | 0–12 | South Korea |
|---|---|---|
| | Report | Lee Hyun-young 4' (pen.), 38', 47', 71', 90'; Moon Mi-ra 11', 37'; Lim Seon-joo 14'; Son Hwa-yeon 48'; Jang Sel-gi 67'; Ji So-yun 88', 90+2' |

Gelora Sriwijaya Stadium, Palembang
Referee: Mahsa Ghorbani (Iran)

== Golf ==
Men

| Athlete | Event | Round 1 | Round 2 | Round 3 | Round 4 | Total | | |
| Athlete | Event | Score | Score | Score | Score | Score | Par | Rank |
|---|---|---|---|---|---|---|---|---|
| Jonathan Wijono | Individual | 75 | 69 | 73 | 71 | 288 | E | 20 |
| Kevin Caesario Akbar | Individual | 75 | 72 | 72 | 74 | 293 | +5 | 29 |
| Naraajie Emerald Ramadhan Putra | Individual | 69 | 72 | 77 | 68 | 286 | –2 | 13 |
| Almay Rayhan Yagutah | Individual | 73 | 72 | 72 | 77 | 294 | +6 | 31 |
| Jonathan Wijono; Kevin Caesario Akbar; Naraajie Emerald Ramadhan Putra; Almay Rayhan Yagutah | Team | 217 | 213 | 217 | 213 | 860 | –4 | 6 |

Women

| Athlete | Event | Round 1 | Round 2 | Round 3 | Round 4 | Total | | |
| Athlete | Event | Score | Score | Score | Score | Score | Par | Rank |
|---|---|---|---|---|---|---|---|---|
| Rivani Adelia Sihotang | Individual | 77 | 77 | 79 | 75 | 308 | +20 | 32 |
| Ribka Vania | Individual | 71 | 69 | 75 | 70 | 285 | −3 | 9 |
| Melati Putri Ida Ayu Indira | Individual | 72 | 70 | 70 | 73 | 285 | −3 | 9 |
| Rivani Adelia Sihotang; Ribka Vania; Melati Putri Ida Ayu Indira | Team | 143 | 139 | 145 | 143 | 570 | −6 | 6 |

== Handball ==
Indonesia men's handball team drawn in group C at the Games, while the women's team in group B.

Summary

Key:

- ET – After extra time
- P – Match decided by penalty-shootout.

| Team | Event | Preliminary | Standing | Main / Class. | Rank / standing | Semifinals / Pl. | Final / BM / Pl. | |
| Team | Event | Opposition score | Standing | Opposition score | Rank / standing | Opposition score | Opposition score | Rank |
|---|---|---|---|---|---|---|---|---|
| Indonesia men's | Men's tournament | Group C Hong Kong: L 17–40; Saudi Arabia: L 13–47 | 3 | Group III; Pakistan: L 23–28; Chinese Taipei: L 19–37; Malaysia: W 31–22; India: L 23–37 | 12 | did not advance | | |
| Indonesia women's | Women's tournament | Group B Malaysia: W 23–15; Thailand: L 16–34; Hong Kong: L 11–35; Japan: L 6–62 | 4 | —N/a | | North Korea; L 15–59 | Hong Kong; L 16–30 | 8 |

=== Men's tournament ===
Roster

- Nur Rahman Effendi
- Andi Yoga Ananda
- Fitra Agung Aditya Pratama
- Oni Arianus Sir
- Yulianto Effendi Sir
- Bagas
- Rufan Pujianto
- Viktorius Rafael Tobing
- Alias Ilyas
- Harun Nurrasyid
- Saepul Rahman
- Muhammad Aryasatya Hidayat Noor
- Moch. Phasa Nurfauzan
- Rian Kurniawan
- Dupa Gilang Pratama Wiguna
- Risky Fidelano

Group C

| Pos | Team | Pld | W | D | L | GF | GA | GD | Pts | Qualification |
|---|---|---|---|---|---|---|---|---|---|---|
| 1 | Saudi Arabia | 2 | 2 | 0 | 0 | 89 | 37 | +52 | 4 | Main round / Group 1–2 |
| 2 | Hong Kong | 2 | 1 | 0 | 1 | 64 | 59 | +5 | 2 | Main round / Group 1–2 |
| 3 | Indonesia | 2 | 0 | 0 | 2 | 30 | 87 | −57 | 0 | Main round / Group 3 |

Source: AHF

| 13 August; 20:00 | Hong Kong | 40–17 | Indonesia | POPKI Sports Hall, Jakarta; Referees: Tavakkoli, Valadkhanian (IRI) |
| 13 August; 20:00 | Chan 9 | (19–6) | Tolang 5 | POPKI Sports Hall, Jakarta; Referees: Tavakkoli, Valadkhanian (IRI) |
| 13 August; 20:00 | 3× (yellow card) 2× (suspension) | | 2× (yellow card) 3× (suspension) | POPKI Sports Hall, Jakarta; Referees: Tavakkoli, Valadkhanian (IRI) |

| 17 August; 14:00 | Indonesia | 13–47 | Saudi Arabia | POPKI Sports Hall, Jakarta; Referees: Shakir, Kadhim (IRQ) |
| 17 August; 14:00 | Bagas, Tolang 5 | (4–21) | Al-Saffar 8 | POPKI Sports Hall, Jakarta; Referees: Shakir, Kadhim (IRQ) |
| 17 August; 14:00 | 2× (yellow card) | | 2× (suspension) | POPKI Sports Hall, Jakarta; Referees: Shakir, Kadhim (IRQ) |

Classification round

| Pos | Team | Pld | W | D | L | GF | GA | GD | Pts |
|---|---|---|---|---|---|---|---|---|---|
| 1 | Chinese Taipei | 4 | 4 | 0 | 0 | 142 | 95 | +47 | 8 |
| 2 | India | 4 | 3 | 0 | 1 | 141 | 104 | +37 | 6 |
| 3 | Pakistan | 4 | 2 | 0 | 2 | 134 | 111 | +23 | 4 |
| 4 | Indonesia | 4 | 1 | 0 | 3 | 96 | 124 | −28 | 2 |
| 5 | Malaysia | 4 | 0 | 0 | 4 | 78 | 157 | −79 | 0 |

Source: AHF

| 21 August; 9:00 | Indonesia | 23–28 | Pakistan | POPKI Sports Hall, Jakarta; Referees: Al-Saqer, Al-Suqufi (KSA) |
| 21 August; 9:00 | Tolang 11 | (10–12) | M. Hussain 8 | POPKI Sports Hall, Jakarta; Referees: Al-Saqer, Al-Suqufi (KSA) |
| 21 August; 9:00 | 1× (yellow card) 2× (suspension) | | 1× (yellow card) 2× (suspension) | POPKI Sports Hall, Jakarta; Referees: Al-Saqer, Al-Suqufi (KSA) |

| 24 August; 9:00 | Indonesia | 19–37 | Chinese Taipei | POPKI Sports Hall, Jakarta; Referees: Al-Wahibi, Al-Shahi (OMA) |
| 24 August; 9:00 | Tolang 7 | (7–18) | Chiu, Huang C.K., Hsiao 5 | POPKI Sports Hall, Jakarta; Referees: Al-Wahibi, Al-Shahi (OMA) |
| 24 August; 9:00 | 2× (yellow card) 5× (suspension) | | 2× (yellow card) | POPKI Sports Hall, Jakarta; Referees: Al-Wahibi, Al-Shahi (OMA) |

| 26 August; 14:00 | Indonesia | 31–22 | Malaysia | POPKI Sports Hall, Jakarta; Referees: Li, Ke (CHN) |
| 26 August; 14:00 | Bagas 10 | (15–8) | Ismail 4 | POPKI Sports Hall, Jakarta; Referees: Li, Ke (CHN) |
| 26 August; 14:00 | 1× (yellow card) 1× (suspension) | | 1× (yellow card) 4× (suspension) | POPKI Sports Hall, Jakarta; Referees: Li, Ke (CHN) |

| 29 August; 14:00 | India | 37–23 | Indonesia | POPKI Sports Hall, Jakarta; Referees: Al-Suqufi, Al-Saqer (KSA) |
| 29 August; 14:00 | D. Singh 11 | (16–13) | Tolang 9 | POPKI Sports Hall, Jakarta; Referees: Al-Suqufi, Al-Saqer (KSA) |
| 29 August; 14:00 | 3× (suspension) | | 2× (yellow card) 7× (suspension) | POPKI Sports Hall, Jakarta; Referees: Al-Suqufi, Al-Saqer (KSA) |

=== Women's tournament ===
Roster

- Shantika Ayuning Baharizki
- Fitri Anggi Yani
- Claudia Finka Wiranata
- Inge Indah Wijayatri
- Dian Ekavianti Fefan
- M. Shinta Hidayatuzzaroh
- Lia Apriliani
- Ria Astuti
- Marselina
- Afifatur Rofidiyah
- Putri Dwi Merdekawati
- Gadis Risma Septiananda
- Sri Nurlinda
- Anggun Pramesti
- Felita Widya Dhana
- Anisa Yulianti

Group B

| Pos | Team | Pld | W | D | L | GF | GA | GD | Pts | Qualification |
|---|---|---|---|---|---|---|---|---|---|---|
| 1 | Japan | 4 | 4 | 0 | 0 | 208 | 38 | +170 | 8 | Semifinals |
| 2 | Thailand | 4 | 3 | 0 | 1 | 120 | 93 | +27 | 6 | Semifinals |
| 3 | Hong Kong | 4 | 2 | 0 | 2 | 112 | 97 | +15 | 4 | Classification 5th–8th |
| 4 | Indonesia | 4 | 1 | 0 | 3 | 56 | 146 | −90 | 2 | Classification 5th–8th |
| 5 | Malaysia | 4 | 0 | 0 | 4 | 45 | 167 | −122 | 0 | Classification 9th–10th |

Source: AHF

| 14 August; 18:00 | Malaysia | 15–23 | Indonesia | POPKI Sports Hall, Jakarta; Referees: Al-Saqer, Al-Suqufi (KSA) |
| 14 August; 18:00 | Yusri 4 | (9–12) | Apriliani 7 | POPKI Sports Hall, Jakarta; Referees: Al-Saqer, Al-Suqufi (KSA) |
| 14 August; 18:00 | 2× (yellow card) 8× (suspension) 1× (red card) | | 3× (yellow card) 2× (suspension) | POPKI Sports Hall, Jakarta; Referees: Al-Saqer, Al-Suqufi (KSA) |

| 16 August; 11:00 | Thailand | 34–16 | Indonesia | POPKI Sports Hall, Jakarta; Referees: Li, Ke (CHN) |
| 16 August; 11:00 | Hongbooddee 10 | (19–6) | Wijayatri 4 | POPKI Sports Hall, Jakarta; Referees: Li, Ke (CHN) |
| 16 August; 11:00 | 2× (yellow card) 3× (suspension) | | 3× (yellow card) 4× (suspension) | POPKI Sports Hall, Jakarta; Referees: Li, Ke (CHN) |

| 21 August; 20:00 | Hong Kong | 35–11 | Indonesia | POPKI Sports Hall, Jakarta; Referees: Shakir, Kadhim (IRQ) |
| 21 August; 20:00 | Wu 12 | (17–5) | five players 2 | POPKI Sports Hall, Jakarta; Referees: Shakir, Kadhim (IRQ) |
| 21 August; 20:00 | 1× (yellow card) 2× (suspension) | | 1× (yellow card) 4× (suspension) | POPKI Sports Hall, Jakarta; Referees: Shakir, Kadhim (IRQ) |

| 23 August; 18:00 | Indonesia | 6–62 | Japan | POPKI Sports Hall, Jakarta; Referees: Lee, Lee (KOR) |
| 23 August; 18:00 | Apriliani 4 | (4–34) | Kawata 11 | POPKI Sports Hall, Jakarta; Referees: Lee, Lee (KOR) |
| 23 August; 18:00 | 1× (yellow card) 6× (suspension) | | 2× (yellow card) | POPKI Sports Hall, Jakarta; Referees: Lee, Lee (KOR) |

5–8th place semifinals

| 25 August; 16:00 | North Korea | 59–15 | Indonesia | POPKI Sports Hall, Jakarta; Referees: Al-Wahibi, Al-Shahi (OMA) |
| 25 August; 16:00 | Choe P. 13 | (28–6) | Apriliani 7 | POPKI Sports Hall, Jakarta; Referees: Al-Wahibi, Al-Shahi (OMA) |
| 25 August; 16:00 | 1× (yellow card) 1× (suspension) | | 2× (yellow card) 5× (suspension) | POPKI Sports Hall, Jakarta; Referees: Al-Wahibi, Al-Shahi (OMA) |

Seventh place game

| 29 August; 11:00 | Indonesia | 16–30 | Hong Kong | POPKI Sports Hall, Jakarta; Referees: Lee, Lee (KOR) |
| 29 August; 11:00 | Baharizki, Apriliani 4 | (8–18) | Cheung M. 10 | POPKI Sports Hall, Jakarta; Referees: Lee, Lee (KOR) |
| 29 August; 11:00 | 2× (yellow card) 4× (suspension) | | 2× (yellow card) 5× (suspension) | POPKI Sports Hall, Jakarta; Referees: Lee, Lee (KOR) |

== Jet ski ==
Indonesia entered three jet skiers at the Games, with two gold medals targeted by the government.

| Athlete | Event | Moto Points | | | | Ded. | Total | Rank |
| Athlete | Event | 1 | 2 | 3 | 4 | Ded. | Total | Rank |
|---|---|---|---|---|---|---|---|---|
| Aero Sutan Aswar | Runabout limited | 39 | 53 | 43 | 53 | —N/a | 188 | 2nd place, silver medalist(s) |
| Aqsa Sutan Aswar | Runabout limited | 60 | 48 | 48 | 30 | —N/a | 186 | 3rd place, bronze medalist(s) |
| Aqsa Sutan Aswar | Runabout 1100 stock | 36 | 11 | DNF | DNF | —N/a | 58 | 12 |
| Muhammad Farizi | Runabout 1100 stock | 48 | 43 | 33 | 27 | —N/a | 151 | 5 |
| Aero Sutan Aswar | Runabout endurance open | 320 | 336 | 368 | —N/a | | 1024 | 8 |
| Aqsa Sutan Aswar | Runabout endurance open | 400 | 368 | 375 | —N/a | –5 | 1138 | 1st place, gold medalist(s) |
| Aqsa Sutan Aswar | Ski modified | 33 | DNF | DNF | DNF | —N/a | 33 | 8 |
| Muhammad Farizi | Ski modified | 30 | DNF | DNF | DNF | —N/a | 30 | 9 |

== Ju-jitsu ==
Key:

- ADV – Won by advantages.
- RDC – Won by referee decision.
- SUB – Won by submission.

Men

| Athlete | Event | Round of 64 | Round of 32 | Round of 16 | Quarterfinals | Semifinals | Repechage | Final / BM | Rank |
| Athlete | Event | Opposition Result | Opposition Result | Opposition Result | Opposition Result | Opposition Result | Opposition Result | Opposition Result | Rank |
|---|---|---|---|---|---|---|---|---|---|
| Handoko Wahyu Hidayat | –56 kg | —N/a | Bye | N Seiduali (KAZ); L 0–100^{SUB} | did not advance | | | | |
| Ananda Mauludy Ikhsan | –56 kg | —N/a | Bye | K Konyssov (KAZ); L 0–100^{SUB} | did not advance | | | | |
| Imam Mastur | –62 kg | —N/a | D Hilal (LBN); L 0–15 | did not advance | | | | | |
| Fikri Ramadhan | –62 kg | —N/a | AR Eidi (IRI); L 0–8 | did not advance | | | | | |
| Julius Saputera | –69 kg | —N/a | R Yimprai (THA); W 2–0 | G Al-Harahsheh (UAE); L 0–10 | did not advance | | | | |
| Fransino Tirta | –69 kg | —N/a | J Hojamyradow (TKM); L 0–2 | did not advance | | | | | |
| Reyhan Benatar Algadri | –77 kg | Bye | AH Kadour (SYR); W 100^{SUB}–0 | M Al-Qubaisi (UAE); L 0–4 | did not advance | | | | |
| Willy | –77 kg | Bye | Quek KH (SGP); W 3–0 | A Mustakov (KGZ); L 0–100^{SUB} | did not advance | | | | |
| Rudi Gunawan | –85 kg | —N/a | Bye | A Murtazaliev (KGZ); L 0–2 | did not advance | | | | |
| Andy Sukandar | –85 kg | —N/a | M Hamidi (IRI); L 0–0^{ADV} | did not advance | | | | | |
| Muhammad Ariq Noor | –94 kg | —N/a | Bye | M Ali (KUW); DSQ | F Al-Ketbi (UAE); L 0–100^{SUB} | Did not advance | R Makhashev (KAZ); L 0–100^{SUB} | did not advance | |
| Herman Tri Saputra | –94 kg | —N/a | Bye | R Kussainov (KAZ); L 0–100^{SUB} | did not advance | | | | |

Women

| Athlete | Event | Round of 32 | Round of 16 | Quarterfinals | Semifinals | Repechage | Final / BM | Rank |
| Athlete | Event | Opposition Result | Opposition Result | Opposition Result | Opposition Result | Opposition Result | Opposition Result | Rank |
|---|---|---|---|---|---|---|---|---|
| Santi Apriyani Savitri | –49 kg | Bye | K Napolis (PHI); L 0–100^{SUB} | did not advance | | | | |
| Cornelia Lumban Tobing | –49 kg | Dương TTM (VIE); L 0–5 | did not advance | | | | | |
| Simone Julia | –62 kg | Bye | M Mannonova (UZB); DSQ | C Lien (SGP); L 0–12 | Did not advance | B Al-Matrooshi (UAE); W 2–0 | T Udval (MGL); L 2–2^{ADV} | – |
| Ilma Yeni Megawati | –62 kg | Y Kakish (JOR); L 0–100^{SUB} | did not advance | | | | | |

== Judo ==
Key:

- 1st number — Ippon
- 2nd number — Waza-ari
- s — Shido

Men

| Athlete | Event | Round of 32 | Round of 16 | Quarterfinals | Semifinals | Repechage | Final / BM | Rank |
| Athlete | Event | Opposition Result | Opposition Result | Opposition Result | Opposition Result | Opposition Result | Opposition Result | Rank |
|---|---|---|---|---|---|---|---|---|
| Muhammad Alfiansyah Lubis | –60 kg | Bye | Y Smetov (KAZ); L 00s2–10s1 | did not advance | | | | |
| Mochammad Syaiful Raharjo | –66 kg | Y Bokiev (TJK); L 01s3–10 | did not advance | | | | | |
| Iksan Apriyadi | –73 kg | Qing DG (CHN); L 00s1–01 | did not advance | | | | | |
| Gerard George | –81 kg | Bye | S Mollaei (IRI); L 00s1–10 | did not advance | | | | |
| Horas Manurung | –90 kg | Bye | T Tejenov (TKM); L 00–10 | did not advance | | | | |
| Gede Ganding Kalbu Soethama | –100 kg | Bye | Cho G-h (KOR); L 00s1–10 | did not advance | | | | |
| Toga Pramandita | +100 kg | —N/a | Yin YJ (CHN); L 00s1–10s1 | did not advance | | | | |

Women

| Athlete | Event | Round of 32 | Round of 16 | Quarterfinals | Semifinals | Repechage | Final / BM | Rank |
| Athlete | Event | Opposition Result | Opposition Result | Opposition Result | Opposition Result | Opposition Result | Opposition Result | Rank |
|---|---|---|---|---|---|---|---|---|
| Devi Sinta | –48 kg | —N/a | Gao J-y (TPE); L 01–10s1 | did not advance | | | | |
| Amanah Nur Istiqomah | –52 kg | Bye | Park D-s (KOR); L 00–10 | did not advance | | | | |
| Ni Kadek Anny Pandini | –57 kg | Bye | S Nishanbayeva (KAZ); L 00–10 | did not advance | | | | |
| Ardelia Yuli Fradivtha | –63 kg | —N/a | PL Khatri (NEP); W 01s1–00 | N Nabekura (JPN); L 00–10 | Did not advance | Han H-j (KOR); L 00s1–10 | did not advance | |
| Hevrilia Windawati | –70 kg | —N/a | Kim S-y (KOR); L 00s2–11 | did not advance | | | | |
| Vika Irma Safitri | –78 kg | —N/a | K Chanthakoummane (LAO); L 00–10 | did not advance | | | | |
| I Dewa Ayu Mira Widari | +78 kg | —N/a | R Ilmatova (UZB); L 00–10s2 | did not advance | | | | |

Mixed

| Athlete | Event | Round of 16 | Quarterfinals | Semifinals | Repechage | Final / BM | Rank |
| Athlete | Event | Opposition Result | Opposition Result | Opposition Result | Opposition Result | Opposition Result | Rank |
|---|---|---|---|---|---|---|---|
| Gerard George; Horas Manurung; Aditya Wahyudi Muhammad; Budi Prasetiyo; Gede Ganding Kalbu Soethama; Ardelia Yuli Fradivtha; Amanah Nur Istiqomah; I Dewa Ayu Mira Widari | Team | Bye | Uzbekistan (UZB); L 0–4 | Did not advance | India (IND); L 0–4 | did not advance | |

== Kabaddi ==
Summary

| Team | Event | Group Stage | | | | | | Semifinal | Final | |
| Team | Event | Opposition score | Opposition score | Opposition score | Opposition score | Opposition score | Rank | Opposition score | Opposition score | Rank |
|---|---|---|---|---|---|---|---|---|---|---|
| Indonesia men's | Men | Nepal; W 33−29 | Japan; W 34−26 | Malaysia; W 30−22 | Pakistan; L 11−40 | Iran; L 24−65 | 3 | did not advance | | 5 |
| Indonesia women's | Women | Japan; W 30−22 | Sri Lanka; L 17−34 | India; L 22−54 | Thailand; L 15−35 | —N/a | 4 | did not advance | | 7 |

=== Men's tournament ===
Team roster

- I Gede Feri Setiawan
- I Ketut Sudita
- I Made Arya Negara
- I Wayan Halus Suandana
- Dicki Candra
- Ida Bagus Ketut Wipradana
- I Komang Dandy Darmawan
- Faisal Ihsan Kamil
- Setya Yogasena
- Aldino Indrayana
- I Putu Wahyu Juniartha
- I Nyoman Tos Pasek Wiguna

Group B

| Pos | Team | Pld | W | D | L | PF | PA | PD | Pts | Qualification |
|---|---|---|---|---|---|---|---|---|---|---|
| 1 | Iran | 5 | 5 | 0 | 0 | 289 | 109 | +180 | 10 | Semifinals |
| 2 | Pakistan | 5 | 4 | 0 | 1 | 185 | 98 | +87 | 8 | Semifinals |
| 3 | Indonesia | 5 | 3 | 0 | 2 | 132 | 182 | −50 | 6 | |
| 4 | Japan | 5 | 2 | 0 | 3 | 121 | 162 | −41 | 4 | |
| 5 | Nepal | 5 | 1 | 0 | 4 | 127 | 194 | −67 | 2 | |
| 6 | Malaysia | 5 | 0 | 0 | 5 | 100 | 209 | −109 | 0 | |

Source: OCA

19 August
18:00

| Indonesia | 33–29 (HT: 20–14) | Nepal |

Garuda Theatre, Jakarta

20 August
19:00

| Indonesia | 34–26 (HT: 15–12) | Japan |

Garuda Theatre, Jakarta

21 August
14:00

| Indonesia | 30–22 (HT: 15–11) | Malaysia |

Garuda Theatre, Jakarta

21 August
19:00

| Indonesia | 11–40 (HT: 5–18) | Pakistan |

Garuda Theatre, Jakarta

22 August
18:00

| Indonesia | 24–65 (HT: 10–33) | Iran |

Garuda Theatre, Jakarta

=== Women's tournament ===
Team roster

- Komang Ariningsih
- Ni Kadek Amiariasti
- Ni Putu Dewi Laraswati
- Ni Kadek Ernawati
- Desak Gede Indah Vinda D
- I Gusti Anak Agung Pradnyawati
- Ni Komang Isna Pratiwi
- Ni Ketut Puspasari
- Agustina Siregar
- Kadek Candra Wahyuni
- Kadek Surya Febriantari
- Ni Made Praarthini Samitha

Group A

| Pos | Team | Pld | W | D | L | PF | PA | PD | Pts | Qualification |
|---|---|---|---|---|---|---|---|---|---|---|
| 1 | India | 4 | 4 | 0 | 0 | 168 | 69 | +99 | 8 | Semifinals |
| 2 | Thailand | 4 | 3 | 0 | 1 | 142 | 75 | +67 | 6 | Semifinals |
| 3 | Sri Lanka | 4 | 2 | 0 | 2 | 83 | 113 | −30 | 4 | |
| 4 | Indonesia | 4 | 1 | 0 | 3 | 84 | 145 | −61 | 2 | |
| 5 | Japan | 4 | 0 | 0 | 4 | 63 | 138 | −75 | 0 | |

Source: OCA

19 August
12:20

| Indonesia | 30–22 (HT: 18–9) | Japan |

Garuda Theatre, Jakarta

20 August
9:00

| Indonesia | 17–34 (HT: 6–17) | Sri Lanka |

Garuda Theatre, Jakarta

21 August
12:20

| India | 54–22 (HT: 28–10) | Indonesia |

Garuda Theatre, Jakarta

23 August
11:00

| Indonesia | 15–35 (HT: 6–18) | Thailand |

Garuda Theatre, Jakarta

== Karate ==
Indonesia prepared a team that will participate in the karate competition. The National Karate Federation (FORKI) selected eight karate practitioners (4 men's and 4 women's) for the Games.

== Kurash ==
Men

| Athlete | Event | Round of 32 | Round of 16 | Quarterfinal | Semifinal | Final | |
| Athlete | Event | Opposition Score | Opposition Score | Opposition Score | Opposition Score | Opposition Score | Rank |
|---|---|---|---|---|---|---|---|
| Hendi Hadiat | –66 kg | MG Salem (YEM); L 000−100 | did not advance | | | | |
| Aprilianda Adi Timur | –66 kg | M Gaybulloev (UZB); L 000−101 | did not advance | | | | |
| Komang Ardiarta | –81 kg | D Catipon (PHI); W 011−000 | B Mohammadi (AFG); L 000−100 | did not advance | | | |
| Bayu Febrian Rahman | –81 kg | Bye | E Aliakbari (IRI); L 000−111 | did not advance | | | |
| Muhammad Dhifa Alfais | –90 kg | D Sharma (IND); L 000−002 | did not advance | | | | |
| Putu Wiradamungga | –90 kg | Bye | Lo Y-h (TPE); L 000−012 | did not advance | | | |
| Frangkling Kakalang | +90 kg | Lee P-y (TPE); L 000−100 | did not advance | | | | |
| Billy Sugara | +90 kg | Z Zahir (PAK); W 100−000 | AB Rahmani (AFG); L 000−101 | did not advance | | | |

Women

| Athlete | Event | Round of 32 | Round of 16 | Quarterfinal | Semifinal | Final | |
| Athlete | Event | Opposition Score | Opposition Score | Opposition Score | Opposition Score | Opposition Score | Rank |
|---|---|---|---|---|---|---|---|
| Heka Maya Sari Sembiring | –52 kg | G Sulaymanova (UZB); L 000−100 | did not advance | | | | |
| Tri Kusumawardani Susanti | –52 kg | Nguyễn NN (VIE); W 012−000 | G Loberanes (PHI); W 011−000 | P Balhara (IND); L 000−001 | did not advance | | |
| Siti Latifah | –63 kg | Bye | Lee W-t (TPE); L 000−100 | did not advance | | | |
| Khasani Najmu Shifa | –63 kg | P Narkkarach (THA); W 003−000 | Z Naderi (IRI); W 010−010 | M Tokas (IND); W 001−000 | D Shermetova (UZB); W 001−001 | Did not advance | 3rd place, bronze medalist(s) |
| Szalsza Maulida | –78 kg | Bye | K Yuldashova (UZB); L 001−110 | did not advance | | | |
| Marselina Papara | –78 kg | Bye | O Mönkhtsetseg (MGL); L 000−111 | did not advance | | | |

== Modern pentathlon ==
Modern Pentathton Indonesia (MPI) announced four pentathletes to compete at the Games.

| Athlete | Event | Swimming (200 m freestyle) | | Fencing (épée one touch) | | Riding (show jumping) | | Laser-run (shooting 10 m air pistol/ running 3200 m) | | Total points | Final rank |
| Athlete | Event | Rank | MP points | Rank | MP points | Rank | MP points | Rank | MP points | Total points | Final rank |
|---|---|---|---|---|---|---|---|---|---|---|---|
| Frada Harahap | Men's | 14 | 244 | 14 | 131 | 10 | 262 | 9 | 563 | 1200 | 10 |
| Yusri | Men's | 13 | 265 | 12 | 139 | 11 | 241 | 11 | 519 | 1164 | 11 |
| Dea Putri | Women's | 9 | 285 | 13 | 162 | 10 | 0 (DNS) | 9 | 422 | 869 | 10 |
| Adrianida Saleh | Women's | 10 | 268 | 12 | 171 | 10 | 0 (DNS) | 11 | 334 | 773 | 12 |

== Paragliding ==
Men

| Athlete | Event | Round | | | | | | | | | | Total | Rank |
| Athlete | Event | 1 | 2 | 3 | 4 | 5 | 6 | 7 | 8 | 9 | 10 | Total | Rank |
|---|---|---|---|---|---|---|---|---|---|---|---|---|---|
| Joni Efendi | Individual accuracy | ~~155~~ | 135 | 6 | 77 | 2 | 11 | 2 | 4 | 7 | 1 | 245 | 5 |
| Jafro Megawanto | Individual accuracy | 3 | 6 | ~~52~~ | 0 | 2 | 7 | 3 | 2 | 2 | 2 | 27 | 1st place, gold medalist(s) |
| Aris Apriansyah; Joni Efendi; Jafro Megawanto; Hening Paradigma; Roni Pratama | Team accuracy | 315 | 272 | 70 | 288 | 64 | 95 | —N/a | | | | 1104 | 1st place, gold medalist(s) |
| Aris Apriansyah; Joni Efendi; Jafro Megawanto; Hening Paradigma; Roni Pratama | Cross-country | 2917 | 901 | 2490 | 1928 | 2637 | —N/a | | | | | 10873 | 3rd place, bronze medalist(s) |

Women

| Athlete | Event | Round | | | | | | | | | | Total | Rank |
| Athlete | Event | 1 | 2 | 3 | 4 | 5 | 6 | 7 | 8 | 9 | 10 | Total | Rank |
|---|---|---|---|---|---|---|---|---|---|---|---|---|---|
| Rika Wijayanti | Individual accuracy | 16 | 2 | 1 | ~~169~~ | 5 | 4 | 1 | 84 | 1 | 6 | 120 | 3rd place, bronze medalist(s) |
| Ike Ayu Wulandari | Individual accuracy | 7 | 177 | 139 | 57 | 170 | 72 | ~~500~~ | 2 | 26 | 306 | 956 | 5 |
| Lis Andriana; Rika Wijayanti; Ike Ayu Wulandari | Team accuracy | 343 | 183 | 640 | 247 | 624 | 85 | —N/a | | | | 2122 | 2nd place, silver medalist(s) |
| Lis Andriana; Rika Wijayanti; Ike Ayu Wulandari | Cross-country | 479 | 503 | 509 | 800 | 248 | —N/a | | | | | 2539 | 3rd place, bronze medalist(s) |

== Pencak silat ==
Ikatan Pencak Silat Indonesia (IPSI) sent 22 athletes to compete at the Games. 12 athletes (6 men's and 6 women's) competed in the seni events, while 10 athletes (7 men's and 3 women's) in the tanding events.

Seni

| Athlete | Event | Preliminary | | Final | |
| Athlete | Event | Result | Rank | Result | Rank |
|---|---|---|---|---|---|
| Sugianto | Men's tunggal | 467 | 1 Q | 471 | 1st place, gold medalist(s) |
| Yolla Primadona Jampil; Hendy | Men's ganda | —N/a | | 580 | 1st place, gold medalist(s) |
| Nunu Nugraha; Asep Yuldan Sani; Anggi Faisal Mubarok | Men's regu | —N/a | | 465 | 1st place, gold medalist(s) |
| Puspa Arumsari | Women's tunggal | 465 | 1 Q | 467 | 1st place, gold medalist(s) |
| Ayu Sidan Wilantari; Ni Made Dwiyanti | Women's ganda | —N/a | | 574 | 1st place, gold medalist(s) |
| Pramudita Yuristya; Lutfi Nurhasanah; Gina Tri Lestari | Women's regu | —N/a | | 466 | 1st place, gold medalist(s) |

Tanding

| Athlete | Event | Round of 16 | Quarterfinals | Semifinals | Final | |
| Athlete | Event | Opposition Result | Opposition Result | Opposition Result | Opposition Result | Rank |
|---|---|---|---|---|---|---|
| Abdul Malik | Men's –55 kg | Nguyễn ĐT (VIE); W 3–1 | S Cheni (THA); W 5–0 | B Thammavongsa (LAO); W 5–0 | MF Nasir (MAS); W 5–0 | 1st place, gold medalist(s) |
| Hanifan Yudani Kusumah | Men's –60 kg | Bye | P Vongphakdy (LAO); W 5–0 | A Chemaeng (THA); W 5–0 | Nguyễn TL (VIE); W 3–2 | 1st place, gold medalist(s) |
| Iqbal Candra Pratama | Men's –65 kg | P Poolkaew (THA); W 5–0 | MZ Hakim (MAS); W 5–0 | A Salimov (UZB); W 5–0 | Nguyễn NT (VIE); W 4–1 | 1st place, gold medalist(s) |
| Komang Harik Adi Putra | Men's –70 kg | D Ximenes (TLS); W 5–0 | S Juanda (SGP); W 5–0 | Phạm TA (VIE); W 5–0 | MA Jamari (MAS); W 4–1 | 1st place, gold medalist(s) |
| Amri Rusdana | Men's –75 kg | N Saidov (UZB); W 5–0 | M Ranjdoust (IRI); W 5–0 | MF Khalid (MAS); L 2–3 | Did not advance | 3rd place, bronze medalist(s) |
| Aji Bangkit Pamungkas | Men's –90 kg | —N/a | Bye | Nguyễn DT (VIE); W 5–0 | SF Alau'ddin (SGP); W 5–0 | 1st place, gold medalist(s) |
| Eko Febrianto | Men's –95 kg | Bye | SF Alau'ddin (SGP); DSQ | did not advance | | |
| Wewey Wita | Women's –55 kg | Bye | S Lueangaphichatkun (THA); W 5–0 | O Sounthavong (LAO); W 5–0 | Trần TT (VIE); W 5–0 | 1st place, gold medalist(s) |
| Sarah Tria Monita | Women's –60 kg | Bye | SS Ajak (MAS); W 5–0 | Hoàng TL (VIE); W 5–0 | NO Vongphakdy (LAO); W 5–0 | 1st place, gold medalist(s) |
| Pipiet Kamelia | Women's –65 kg | —N/a | NS Saiful (SGP); W 5–0 | J Wankrue (THA); W 5–0 | Nguyễn TCN (VIE); W 5–0 | 1st place, gold medalist(s) |

== Roller sports ==
Indonesia entered the skateboarding event at the Games with 6 athletes (4 men's and 2 women's), while 4 athletes (2 men's and 2 women's) participated in the speed skating event.

=== Skateboarding ===
| Athlete | Event | Preliminary | | Final | |
| Athlete | Event | Result | Rank | Result | Rank |
|---|---|---|---|---|---|
| Jason Dennis Lijnzaat | Men's park | 73.00 | 2 Q | 68.33 | 2nd place, silver medalist(s) |
| Pevi Permana Putra | Men's park | 66.66 | 3 Q | 67.00 | 3rd place, bronze medalist(s) |
| Aldwien Angkawidjaya | Men's street | 21.8 | 7 Q | 23.7 | 5 |
| Sanggoe Darma Tanjung | Men's street | 31.3 | 1 Q | 30.5 | 2nd place, silver medalist(s) |
| Bunga Nyimas | Women's park | —N/a | | 41.00 | 4 |
| Aliqqa Novvery | Women's street | —N/a | | 13.3 | 6 |
| Bunga Nyimas | Women's street | —N/a | | 19.8 | 3rd place, bronze medalist(s) |

=== Speed skating ===
| Athlete | Event | Final | |
| Athlete | Event | Time | Rank |
|---|---|---|---|
| Tias Andira | Men's road 20 km race | EL | 10 |
| Oky Andrianto | Men's road 20 km race | 33:55.981 | 7 |
| Salma Falya Niluh Heryadie | Women's road 20 km race | EL | 13 |
| Alifia Meidia Namasta | Women's road 20 km race | EL | 10 |

== Rowing ==
Men

| Athlete | Event | Heats | | Repechage | | Final | |
| Athlete | Event | Time | Rank | Time | Rank | Time | Rank |
|---|---|---|---|---|---|---|---|
| Kakan Kusmana; Edwin Ginanjar Rudiana; Sulpianto; Memo | Quadruple sculls | 6:17.56 | 2 R | 6:25.95 | 1 FA | 6:20.58 | 2nd place, silver medalist(s) |
| Rendi Syuhada Anugrah; Mochamad Alidarta Lakiki | Coxless pair | 8:04.64 | 6 FA | —N/a | | 7:45.23 | 6 |
| Denri Maulidzar Al-Ghiffari | Lightweight single sculls | 8:13.85 | 5 R | 8:21.46 | 5 FB | 7:43.40 | 7 |
| Romdhon Mardiana; Mahendra Yanto | Lightweight double sculls | 7:12.41 | 3 R | 7:27.55 | 3 FA | 7:07.20 | 4 |
| Ali Buton; Ferdiansyah; Ihram; Ardi Isadi | Lightweight coxless four | 6:49.25 | 1 FA | Bye | | 6:31.08 | 2nd place, silver medalist(s) |
| Tanzil Hadid; Muhad Yakin; Rio Rizki Darmawan; Jefri Ardianto; Ali Buton; Ferdiansyah; Ihram; Ardi Isadi; Ujang Hasbulloh | Lightweight coxless four | 6:13.83 | 1 FA | Bye | | 6:08.88 | 1st place, gold medalist(s) |

Women

| Athlete | Event | Heats | | Repechage | | Final | |
| Athlete | Event | Time | Rank | Time | Rank | Time | Rank |
|---|---|---|---|---|---|---|---|
| Dewi Yuliawati | Single sculls | 10:26.20 | 5 R | 9:41.15 | 4 FB | 9:18.55 | 10 |
| Julianti; Yayah Rokayah | Coxless pair | 8:32.54 | 2 FA | Bye | | 8:03.95 | 3rd place, bronze medalist(s) |
| Chelsea Corputty; Wa Ode Fitri Rahmanjani; Julianti; Yayah Rokayah | Coxless four | 7:37.91 | 3 R | 7:39.81 | 2 FA | 7:19.02 | 3rd place, bronze medalist(s) |
| Wahyuni; Melani Putri; Yuniarti; Syiva Lisdiana | Lightweight quadruple sculls | 7:41.18 | 3 R | 7:36.60 | 4 FA | 7:23.77 | 6 |

== Rugby Sevens ==
Indonesia men's and women's team participated in the Games in Group B of the tournament respectively. Persatuan Rugby Union Indonesia (PRUI) announced its squad of 24 athletes (12 men's and 12 women's) on 6 August.

| Team | Event | Preliminary | Standing | Classification (Pl.) | Rank | Quarterfinal | Semifinal / Pl. | Final / BM / Pl. | |
| Team | Event | Opposition score | Standing | Opposition score | Rank | Opposition score | Opposition score | Opposition score | Rank |
|---|---|---|---|---|---|---|---|---|---|
| Indonesia men's | Men's tournament | Group B Japan: L 0–92; Chinese Taipei: L 26–41; Malaysia: L 5–39 | 4 | Pakistan: L 5–21; United Arab Emirates: W 48–5; Afghanistan: L 12–29 | 11 | did not advance | | | |
| Indonesia women's | Women's tournament | Group B Japan: L 0–65; Thailand: L 5–53; Kazakhstan: L 0–54 | 4 Q | —N/a | | China; L 7–43 | Hong Kong; L 0–51 | South Korea; L 0–27 | 8 |

=== Men's tournament ===
Squad

The following is the Indonesia squad in the men's rugby sevens tournament of the 2018 Asian Games.

Head coach: (New Zealand) George Dennis Wilson

- Nanda Septian Oloan Siregar
- Handika Hadi Wibowo
- Fransiscus Lohtar Matius Sinaga
- Yusuf Satria Nugroho Bagong Putra
- Aqiel Azis Safrurrozi
- Buldan Muhammad Abdurrohman
- Lawrence Oiyaitou
- Dionysius Oktavian Andi Pratikno
- Christopher Adhitya Hardwika
- Muhammad Rifaldi
- Andika Yudistira Pratama
- Muhammad Danial Al Fikri

Group B

| Pos | Team | Pld | W | D | L | PF | PA | PD | Pts | Qualification |
|---|---|---|---|---|---|---|---|---|---|---|
| 1 | Japan | 3 | 3 | 0 | 0 | 170 | 0 | +170 | 9 | Quarterfinals |
| 2 | Malaysia | 3 | 2 | 0 | 1 | 56 | 62 | −6 | 7 | Quarterfinals |
| 3 | Chinese Taipei | 3 | 1 | 0 | 2 | 51 | 74 | −23 | 5 | Quarterfinals |
| 4 | Indonesia | 3 | 0 | 0 | 3 | 31 | 172 | −141 | 3 | Ranking round 9–12 |

Source: Results

30 August
13:34

| Japan | 92–0 | Indonesia |
| Try: Matsui (3) 1' m, 5' c, 7' m Ozawa (2) 2' c, 3' c Motomura (3) 2' c, 6' c, 9' c Sakai 7+' c Oishi (2) 10' m, 11' c Kano 12' c Hayashi 14' c Tuqiri 14+' c Con: Sakai (11/14) |

Gelora Bung Karno Rugby Field, Jakarta
Referee: Patrick Kwok (Hong Kong)

30 August
16:52

| Chinese Taipei | 41–26 | Indonesia |
| Try: Huang T. 2' m Shen M. (2) 4' m, 11' m Chen (2) 7' c, 10' c Hsieh 8' c Huang P. 12' m Con: Shen C. (0/1); Huang P. (3/5); Lin (0/1) | | Try: Abdurrohman 5' c Wibowo 7+' c Oloan 9' c Andi 14+' m Con: Oloan (3/4) |

Gelora Bung Karno Rugby Field, Jakarta
Referee: Craig Chan (Canada)

31 August
13:34

| Malaysia | 39–5 | Indonesia |
| Try: Azmi 2' m Ismail 5' m Nasarrudin (2) 6' c, 8' m Zulkifli (2) 12' c, 14' m Tarmizi 14+' m Con: Mat Zizi (1/4); Asyraff (1/3) | | Try: Oloan 10' m Con: Oiyaitou (0/1) |

Gelora Bung Karno Rugby Field, Jakarta
Referee: Suguru Kamamuta (Japan)

Classification round (9–12)

| Pos | Team | Pld | W | D | L | PF | PA | PD | Pts |
|---|---|---|---|---|---|---|---|---|---|
| 1 | Afghanistan | 3 | 3 | 0 | 0 | 94 | 19 | +75 | 9 |
| 2 | Pakistan | 3 | 2 | 0 | 1 | 102 | 20 | +82 | 7 |
| 3 | Indonesia | 3 | 1 | 0 | 2 | 65 | 55 | +10 | 5 |
| 4 | United Arab Emirates | 3 | 0 | 0 | 3 | 5 | 172 | −167 | 3 |

Source: Results

31 August
16:52

| Indonesia | 5–21 | Pakistan |
| Try: Pratama 12' m Con: Sauri (0/1) | | Try: Bhatti 1' c Mehmood 9' c Altaf 13' c Con: Mehmood (3/3) |

Gelora Bung Karno Rugby Field, Jakarta
Referee: Leow Wei Liang (Singapore)

1 September
11:22

| Indonesia | 48–5 | United Arab Emirates |
| Try: Oiyaitou 1' m Oloan (2) 3' c, 13' c Pratama 5' m Andi 7' m Safrurrozi 10' m Al-Fikri 12' c Wibowo 14' c Con: Oloan (4/8) | | Try: Al-Shehi 7+' m Con: Al-Shehi (0/1) |

Gelora Bung Karno Rugby Field, Jakarta
Referee: Leow Wei Liang (Singapore)

1 September
18:02

| Afghanistan | 29–12 | Indonesia |
| Try: O. Slaimankhel 1' c Gazang (3) 4' m, 7' m, 14' m Zak. Slaimankhel 7+' c Con: O. Slaimankhel (1/3); Say. Slaimankhel (1/1); Azizi (0/1) | | Try: Nugroho 10' c Oloan 11' m Con: Oloan (1/2) |

Gelora Bung Karno Rugby Field, Jakarta
Referee: Charlie Brown (Ireland)

=== Women's tournament ===
Squad

The following is the Indonesia squad in the women's rugby sevens tournament of the 2018 Asian Games. Based on the squad released by PRUI, Ester Christiani Sitompul replaced by Regina Fetowin.

Head coach: (New Zealand) George Dennis Wilson

- Regina Fetowin
- Fevi Susanti
- Pipit Ayu Lestari
- Nadya Silvy Khoirunnisa
- Lesly Adriana Deda
- Dian Wahyu Saputri
- Fanny Givllia Gara Sati
- Tri Sukma Nugraeni
- Indri Katerina Lahu
- Yesi Oktasari
- Veronika Adriana Olua
- Serli Angganice Matindas

Group B

| Pos | Team | Pld | W | D | L | PF | PA | PD | Pts | Qualification |
|---|---|---|---|---|---|---|---|---|---|---|
| 1 | Japan | 3 | 3 | 0 | 0 | 122 | 21 | +101 | 9 | Quarterfinals |
| 2 | Kazakhstan | 3 | 2 | 0 | 1 | 95 | 36 | +59 | 7 | Quarterfinals |
| 3 | Thailand | 3 | 1 | 0 | 2 | 58 | 51 | +7 | 5 | Quarterfinals |
| 4 | Indonesia | 3 | 0 | 0 | 3 | 5 | 172 | −167 | 3 | Quarterfinals |

Source: Results

30 August
11:44

| Japan | 65–0 | Indonesia |
| Try: Otake 2' m Tanaka 4' m Hirano 6' c Nagata (2) 7' m, 7+' m Bativakalolo 8' m Nakamura 9' c Okuroda 10' c Taniguchi 12' c Kurogi (2) 13' c, 14+' m Con: Okuroda (5/9); Nagata (0/1); Bativakalolo (0/1) |

Gelora Bung Karno Rugby Field, Jakarta
Referee: Phoenix Xu (China)

30 August
15:24

| Thailand | 53–5 | Indonesia |
| Try: Bunrak 3' m Yusri (2) 4' m, 7+' m Huankid 7' c Wandee (2) 9' m, 11' m Meechok 12' c Liamrat (2) 13' c, 14+' c Con: Bunrak (4/7); Sawatnam (0/1); Meechok (0/1) | | Try: Lahu 2' m Con: Soni (0/1) |

Gelora Bung Karno Rugby Field, Jakarta
Referee: Craig Chan (Canada)

31 August
11:36

| Kazakhstan | 54–0 | Indonesia |
| Try: Yakovleva 1' m Korotkikh (3) 4' m, 5' c, 6' m Stepanyuga 7+' m Teryayeva 8' m Proskurina 10' m Odnoletok (2) 12' m, 13' c Tkachyova 14' m Con: Baktybayeva (2/7); Nurmatova (0/3) |

Gelora Bung Karno Rugby Field, Jakarta
Referee: Craig Chan (Canada)

Quarterfinal

31 August
15:02

| China | 43–7 | Indonesia |
| Try: Chen K. (3) 3' c, 5' m, 7' c Liu 8' m Hu 10' c Lu 12' c Wang 14+' m Con: Chen M. (3/5); Chen K. (1/1); Yu X. (0/1) | | Try: Olua 13' c Con: Olua (1/1) |

Gelora Bung Karno Rugby Field, Jakarta
Referee: Leow Wei Liang (Singapore)

Classification semifinal (5–8)

1 September
14:44

| Indonesia | 0–51 | Hong Kong |
| | | Try: A. Chan 3' m S. Chan (3) 4' c, 10' m, 14+' c Ho 6' m Nam 7+' m Chong 9' c Kwong 11' m Olson-Thorne 13' m Con: S. Chan (3/9) |

Gelora Bung Karno Rugby Field, Jakarta
Referee: Phoenix Xu (China)

Seventh place game

1 September
18:24

| Indonesia | 0–27 | South Korea |
| | | Try: Gwon 2' c Lee (3) 4' m, 8' m, 14+' m Seo 11' m Con: Lee (1/5) |

Gelora Bung Karno Rugby Field, Jakarta
Referee: Leow Wei Liang (Singapore)

== Sailing ==
Men

| Athlete | Event | Race | | | | | | | | | | | | | | | Total | Rank |
| Athlete | Event | 1 | 2 | 3 | 4 | 5 | 6 | 7 | 8 | 9 | 10 | 11 | 12 | 13 | 14 | 15 | Total | Rank |
|---|---|---|---|---|---|---|---|---|---|---|---|---|---|---|---|---|---|---|
| Nyoman Suartana | RS:X | 9 | 9 | 8 | 8 | 8 | 8 | 8 | 9 | ~~(11)~~; OCS | 7 | 7 | 8 | 8 | 6 | 6 | 109 | 8 |
| Ahmad Zainuddin | Laser | ~~(10)~~ | 9 | 9 | 10 | 10 | 9 | 10 | 8 | 10 | 10 | 8 | 10 | —N/a | | | 103 | 10 |
| Alga Surya Senjaya Epriano; Ismail Abd Rahmat | 49er | ~~(10)~~; OCS | 10; DNF | 7 | 9 | 10; DNF | 9 | 9 | 9 | 9 | 8 | 7 | 9 | 9 | 8 | 10; DNF | 123 | 9 |
| Bobby Feri Andriyanto; Nugie Triwira | 470 | 9 | ~~(10)~~ | 10 | 9 | 10 | 10 | 10 | 8 | 10 | 9 | 8 | 10 | —N/a | | | 103 | 10 |

Women

| Athlete | Event | Race | | | | | | | | | | | | | | | Total | Rank |
| Athlete | Event | 1 | 2 | 3 | 4 | 5 | 6 | 7 | 8 | 9 | 10 | 11 | 12 | 13 | 14 | 15 | Total | Rank |
|---|---|---|---|---|---|---|---|---|---|---|---|---|---|---|---|---|---|---|
| Hoiriyah | RS:X | 5 | 5 | ~~(6)~~ | 6 | 6 | 6 | 6 | 6 | 5 | 4 | 6 | 6 | 5 | 4 | 6 | 76 | 6 |
| Kirana Wardojo | Laser Radial | 7 | 7 | 8 | 7 | 8 | 9 | 6 | 8 | ~~(11)~~; RET | 11; DNE | 6 | 8 | —N/a | | | 85 | 9 |
| Nurul Rahma Iedha; Noviana Puspita Sari | 49er FX | ~~(6)~~; DNF | 6 DNF | 5 | 6 DNF | 6 DNF | 5 | 4 | 6 DNF | 5 | 5 | 5 | 5 | 5 | 4 | 6 DNF | 73 | 5 |
| Nurul Octaviani Basri; Zefanya Eldiva Finandika | 470 | 7 | 7 | 7 | 7 | 7 | 5 | 7 | 7 | 6 | 6 | ~~(8)~~; OCS | 7 | —N/a | | | 73 | 7 |

Mixed

| Athlete | Event | Race | | | | | | | | | | | | | | | Total | Rank |
| Athlete | Event | 1 | 2 | 3 | 4 | 5 | 6 | 7 | 8 | 9 | 10 | 11 | 12 | 13 | 14 | 15 | Total | Rank |
|---|---|---|---|---|---|---|---|---|---|---|---|---|---|---|---|---|---|---|
| Andini Setyaningrum | Laser 4.7 | 17 | 19 | ~~(20)~~ | 19 | 19 | 17 | 20 | 19 | 15 | 20 | 18 | 18 | —N/a | | | 201 | 19 |
| Gregory Roger Wardojo | Laser 4.7 | 11 | 5 | 9 | 4 | 12 | 13 | 10 | 6 | 3 | 13 | ~~(16)~~ | 6 | —N/a | | | 92 | 10 |
| Ridwan Ramadan; Nenni Marlini | RS:One | 9 | 9 | 8 | 10 | 11 | 8 | ~~(18)~~ | 6 | 8 | 10 | 8 | 7 | 7 | 5 | 11 | 117 | 4 |

== Sambo ==
Key:

- SU – Won by submission.

| Athlete | Event | Round of 32 | Round of 16 | Quarterfinal | Semifinal | Repechage 1 | Repechage 2 | Repechage final | Final / BM | |
| Athlete | Event | Opposition Result | Opposition Result | Opposition Result | Opposition Result | Opposition Result | Opposition Result | Opposition Result | Opposition Result | Rank |
|---|---|---|---|---|---|---|---|---|---|---|
| Imam Maulana Muttaqin | Men's 52 kg | Bye | T Amankulov (KGZ); W 3–1 | K Dzhomii (TJK); L 0–1^{SU} | Did not advance | Bye | I Akhmedjanov (UZB); WO | did not advance | | |
| Mohamad Wahyudi | Men's 52 kg | Bye | A Rakhmatilloev (UZB); L 1–3 | did not advance | | | | | | |
| Rio Akbar Bahari | Men's 90 kg | YDF Cruz (MAS); W 2–1 | J Qaddoori (IRQ); W 3–2 | U Khasanbekov (TJK); L 1–7^{SU} | Did not advance | Bye | Chuang K-j (TPE); W 1–0 | R Esgerow (TKM); L 0–8 | did not advance | |
| Yossi Siswanto | Men's 90 kg | ME Noor (MAS); W 3–1 | I Amirkhani (IRI); L 0–8 | did not advance | | | | | | |
| Maria Magdalena Ince | Women's 48 kg | —N/a | Bye | AZ Kyzy (KGZ); W 6–1 | B Oidovchimed (MGL); L 0–10 | Bye | —N/a | Bye | A Zhylkybayeva (KAZ); L 1–7 | 4 |
| Anggun Nurajijah | Women's 48 kg | —N/a | G Narantsetseg (MGL); L 0–5^{SU} | did not advance | | A Zhylkybayeva (KAZ); L 2–8 | —N/a | did not advance | | |
| Mutiara Amanda | Women's 68 kg | Bye | Z Orunowa (TKM); W 5–1 | N Davletova (UZB); L 0–0^{SU} | Did not advance | Bye | T Junsookplung (THA); L 0–3 | did not advance | | |
| Sakinah | Women's 68 kg | Bye | M Davaasüren (MGL); L 0–3 | did not advance | | Bye | G Ismatova (UZB); L 0–0^{SU} | did not advance | | |

== Sepak takraw ==
Men

| Athlete | Event | Group Stage | | | | | Semifinal | Final | |
| Athlete | Event | Opposition Score | Opposition Score | Opposition Score | Opposition Score | Rank | Opposition Score | Opposition Score | Rank |
|---|---|---|---|---|---|---|---|---|---|
| Mohamad Herson Saipul; Muhammad Hardiansyah Muliang; Nofrizal; Abdul Halim Radjiu; Victoria Eka Prasetyo | Regu | Philippines (PHI); W 2–0 | Pakistan (PAK); W 2–0 | Singapore (SGP); W 2–0 | —N/a | 1 Q | South Korea (KOR); W 2–0 | Malaysia (MAS); L 1–2 | 2nd place, silver medalist(s) |
| Muhammad Hardiansyah Muliang; Nofrizal; Saiful Rijal; Husni Uba; Rizky Abdul Rahman Pago; Abdul Halim Radjiu | Quadrant | Japan (JPN); W 2–0 | China (CHN); W 2–0 | Laos (LAO); W 2–0 | Myanmar (MYA); W 2–0 | 1 Q | Singapore (SGP); W 2–0 | Japan (JPN); W 2–1 | 1st place, gold medalist(s) |
| Mohamad Herson Saipul; Muhammad Hardiansyah Muliang; Rezki Yusuf Djaina; Nofrizal; Saiful Rijal; Husni Uba; Hendra Pago; Rizky Abdul Rahman Pago; Abdul Halim Radjiu | Team doubles | Japan (JPN); L 1–2 | Philippines (PHI); W 2–1 | Vietnam (VIE); W 3–0 | —N/a | 1 Q | Laos (LAO); L 0–2 | Did not advance | 3rd place, bronze medalist(s) |
| Mohamad Herson Saipul; Syamsul Akmal; Muhammad Hardiansyah Muliang; Rezki Yusuf Djaina; Andi Try Sandi Saputra; Nofrizal; Saiful Rijal; Husni Uba; Hendra Pago; Rizky Abdul Rahman Pago; Abdul Halim Radjiu; Victoria Eka Prasetyo | Team regu | Iran (IRI); W 3–0 | India (IND); W 3–0 | —N/a | | 1 Q | Malaysia (MAS); L 0–2 | Did not advance | 3rd place, bronze medalist(s) |

Women

| Athlete | Event | Group Stage | | | | | Semifinal | Final | |
| Athlete | Event | Opposition Score | Opposition Score | Opposition Score | Opposition Score | Rank | Opposition Score | Opposition Score | Rank |
|---|---|---|---|---|---|---|---|---|---|
| Leni; Dini Mita Sari; Florensia Cristy; Lena; Akyko Micheel Kapito; Kusnelia | Quadrant | South Korea (KOR); W 2–1 | Myanmar (MYA); W 2–1 | Laos (LAO); W 2–0 | —N/a | 1 Q | Vietnam (VIE); L 1–2 | Did not advance | 3rd place, bronze medalist(s) |
| Maharani Wirowati; Leni; Dini Mita Sari; Sutini Binti Seni; Florensia Cristy; Lena; Akyko Micheel Kapito; Nur Isni Chikita Sumito; Kusnelia; Rini Susanti; Jasmini; Sri Ayu Astuti | Team regu | Myanmar (MYA); L 1–2 | Japan (JPN); W 3–0 | Vietnam (VIE); L 1–2 | Malaysia (MAS); W 3–0 | 3 | did not advance | | |

== Shooting ==
Men

| Athlete | Event | Qualification | | Final | |
| Athlete | Event | Points | Rank | Points | Rank |
|---|---|---|---|---|---|
| Deny Pratama | 10 m air pistol | 570 | 23 | did not advance | |
| Iwan Setiawan | 10 m air pistol | 558 | 33 | did not advance | |
| Totok Trimartanto | 25 m rapid fire pistol | 564 | 15 | did not advance | |
| Anang Yulianto | 25 m rapid fire pistol | 579 | 4 Q | 7 | 6 |
| Fathur Gustafian | 10 m air rifle | 617.2 | 22 | did not advance | |
| Naufal Mahardika | 10 m air rifle | 617.2 | 23 | did not advance | |
| Dwi Firmansyah | 50 m rifle three positions | 1133 | 24 | did not advance | |
| Sahurun | 50 m rifle three positions | 1124 | 30 | did not advance | |
| Farid Prayuda | 300 m standard rifle | —N/a | | 549 | 10 |
| Irawan Saputra | 300 m standard rifle | —N/a | | 558 | 7 |
| Muhammad Sejahtera Dwi Putra | 10 m running target | 567 | 5 | did not advance | |
| Irfandi Julio | 10 m running target | 560 | 11 | did not advance | |
| Muhammad Sejahtera Dwi Putra | 10 m running target mixed | —N/a | | 380 | 2nd place, silver medalist(s) |
| Pahriz Nugra Pratama | 10 m running target mixed | —N/a | | 360 | 13 |
| Bagus Aristyawan | Trap | 84 | 30 | did not advance | |
| Slamet Riadi | Trap | 101 | 29 | did not advance | |
| Slamet Riadi | Double trap | 96 | 20 | did not advance | |
| Anas Muhsinun Joko Santoso | Double trap | 103 | 19 | did not advance | |
| Hilmansyah | Skeet | 76 | 30 | did not advance | |
| Anas Muhsinun Joko Santoso | Skeet | 78 | 29 | did not advance | |

Women

| Athlete | Event | Qualification | | Final | |
| Athlete | Event | Points | Rank | Points | Rank |
|---|---|---|---|---|---|
| Talitha Judith Almira | 10 m air pistol | 522 | 40 | did not advance | |
| Bary Agustini Said | 10 m air pistol | 543 | 37 | did not advance | |
| Eva Yulianti Pratiwi | 25 m pistol | 557 | 29 | did not advance | |
| Oktofin Rarun | 25 m pistol | 557 | 28 | did not advance | |
| Monica Daryanti | 10 m air rifle | 620.8 | 15 | did not advance | |
| Fidela Puspa Dewi | 10 m air rifle | 621.2 | 12 | did not advance | |
| Maharani Ardy | 50 m rifle three positions | 1100 | 32 | did not advance | |
| Vidya Toyyiba | 50 m rifle three positions | 1135 | 24 | did not advance | |
| Sarmunah | Trap | 90 | 24 | did not advance | |
| Sylvia Silimang | Trap | 96 | 23 | did not advance | |
| Sarmunah | Double trap | —N/a | | 84 | 15 |
| Sylvia Silimang | Double trap | —N/a | | 114 | 8 |
| Fany Febriana | Skeet | 71 | 18 | did not advance | |
| Sarmunah | Skeet | 60 | 19 | did not advance | |

Mixed team

| Athlete | Event | Qualification | | Final | |
| Athlete | Event | Points | Rank | Points | Rank |
|---|---|---|---|---|---|
| Deny Pratama; Talitha Judith Almira | 10 m air pistol | 741 | 18 | did not advance | |
| Muhammad Naufal Mahardika; Monica Daryanti | 10 m air rifle | 821.1 | 9 | did not advance | |
| Slamet Riadi; Sylvia Silimang | Trap | 123 | 11 | did not advance | |

== Soft tennis ==
| Athlete | Event | Group Stage | | | | Quarterfinals | Semifinals | Final | |
| Athlete | Event | Opposition score | Opposition score | Opposition score | Rank | Opposition score | Opposition score | Opposition score | Rank |
|---|---|---|---|---|---|---|---|---|---|
| Alexander Elbert Sie | Men's singles | S Doeum (CAM); W 4–0 | S Vannasak (LAO); W 4–0 | Le PV (VIE); W 4–0 | 1 Q | So J-i (PRK); W 4–1 | P Simpatiaji (INA); W 4–1 | Kim J-w (KOR); L 2–4 | 2nd place, silver medalist(s) |
| Prima Simpatiaji | Men's singles | ESH Khan (PAK); W 4–0 | E Bolortuya (MGL); W 4–1 | —N/a | 1 Q | S Uayporn (THA); W 4–0 | AE Sie (INA); L 1–4 | Did not advance | 3rd place, bronze medalist(s) |
| Dede Tari Kusrini | Women's singles | S Rin (CAM); W 4–1 | Kim J-y (KOR); L 3–4 | —N/a | 2 | did not advance | | | |
| Dwi Rahayu Pitri | Women's singles | N Seth (IND); W 4–0 | M Meth (CAM); W 4–0 | —N/a | 1 Q | D Srirungreang (THA); W 4–3 | Chen C-l (TPE); L 2–4 | Did not advance | 3rd place, bronze medalist(s) |
| Irfandi Hendrawan; Dede Tri Kusrini | Mixed doubles | MN Aftab / M Shahid (PAK); W 5–0 | Kuo C-c / Kuo C-c (TPE); L 1–5 | —N/a | 2 | did not advance | | | |
| M. Hemat Bhakti Anugerah; Voni Darlina | Mixed doubles | MA Alcoseba / PL Catindig (PHI); W 5–4 | Lâm QT / Trần THN (VIE); W 5–0 | Kim M-h / So J-i (PRK); L 2–5 | 2 | did not advance | | | |
| M. H B Anugerah; Irfandi Hendrawan; Gusti Jaya Kusuma; Alexander Elbert Sie; Prima Simpatiaji | Men's team | Japan (JPN); L 0–3 | India (IND); W 3–0 | Cambodia (CAM); W 3–0 | 2 Q | Mongolia (MGL); W 2–0 | South Korea (KOR); L 0–2 | Did not advance | 3rd place, bronze medalist(s) |
| Siti Nur Arasy; Voni Darlina; Anadeleyda Kawengian; Dede Tari Kusrini; Dwi Rahayu Pitri | Women's team | Japan (JPN); L 0–3 | Pakistan (PAK); W 3–0 | —N/a | 2 Q | China (CHN); L 0–2 | did not advance | | |

== Softball ==
Summary

| Team | Event | Group Stage | | Semifinal | Bronze medal game | Final | |
| Team | Event | Opposition Score | Rank | Opposition Score | Opposition Score | Opposition Score | Rank |
|---|---|---|---|---|---|---|---|
| Indonesia women's | Women's tournament | China: L 0–12; Japan: L 0–7; Chinese Taipei: L 0–14; South Korea: L 2–4; Philippines: L 0–4; Hong Kong: W 13–0 | 6 | did not advance | | | |

Roster

- Dian Agustina
- Delin
- Agustina Diadiaway
- Cresida Mariska Dwiyanti
- Ilka Arunia Emogene
- Febina Fitriani
- Gisza Gabriella
- Monica Isella
- Steffaney Angelica Johanna
- Lidia Anna Krey
- Adhisty Deynira Nuranjani
- Vinny Anugerah Dwi Putri
- Syehan Hana Rahmania
- Yuka Ramadina
- Ashilla Safiya
- Wa Ode Sitti Saputriani
- Adelaide Tania Waromi

Preliminary round

| Final round |
| Eliminated |

The top four teams will advance to the Final round.

| Team | W | L | RS | RA | WIN% | GB | Tiebreaker |
|---|---|---|---|---|---|---|---|
| Japan | 6 | 0 | 59 | 3 | 1.000 | – | |
| China | 4 | 2 | 30 | 16 | 0.667 | 2 | 1–1; RA = 1 |
| Philippines | 4 | 2 | 20 | 17 | 0.667 | 2 | 1–1; RA = 3 |
| Chinese Taipei | 4 | 2 | 27 | 13 | 0.667 | 2 | 1–1; RA = 7 |
| South Korea | 2 | 4 | 15 | 23 | 0.333 | 4 | |
| Indonesia | 1 | 5 | 15 | 41 | 0.167 | 5 | |
| Hong Kong | 0 | 6 | 2 | 55 | 0.000 | 6 | |

| August 19; 12:30 | China | 12–0 | Indonesia | GBK Softball field |
| August 19; 12:30 | | Boxscore | | GBK Softball field |

| August 19; 17:30 | Indonesia | 0–7 | Japan | GBK Softball field |
| August 19; 17:30 | | Boxscore | | GBK Softball field |

| August 20; 17:30 | Indonesia | 0–14 | Chinese Taipei | GBK Softball field |
| August 20; 17:30 | | Boxscore | | GBK Softball field |

| August 21; 15:00 | South Korea | 4–2 | Indonesia | GBK Softball field |
| August 21; 15:00 | | Boxscore | | GBK Softball field |

| August 22; 12:30 | Philippines | 4–0 | Indonesia | GBK Softball field |
| August 22; 12:30 | | Boxscore | | GBK Softball field |

| August 23; 10:00 | Hong Kong | 0–13 | Indonesia | GBK Softball field |
| August 23; 10:00 | | Boxscore | | GBK Softball field |

== Sport climbing ==
Speed

| Athlete | Event | Qualification | | Round of 16 | Quarterfinals | Semifinals | Final / BM | |
| Athlete | Event | Best | Rank | Opposition Time | Opposition Time | Opposition Time | Opposition Time | Rank |
|---|---|---|---|---|---|---|---|---|
| Aspar Jaelolo | Men's | 6.067 | 4 Q | R Kostyukov (KAZ); W 5.962–6.548 | Lee S-b (KOR); W 5.794–6.118 | Zhong QX (CHN); L 5.651–5.641 | Sabri (INA); W FS | 3rd place, bronze medalist(s) |
| Sabri | Men's | 5.941 | 3 Q | Au C F (HKG); W 6.224–7.188 | A Maimuratov (KAZ); W 6.083–F | R Alipour (IRI); L F–5.633 | A Jaelolo (INA); L FS | 4 |
| Aries Susanti Rahayu | Women's | 7.840 | 1 Q | N Disyabut (THA); W 8.198–12.750 | Sa S (KOR); W 8.090–9.428 | Song YL (CHN); W 7.682–7.809 | P Lestari (INA); W 7.612–7.980 | 1st place, gold medalist(s) |
| Puji Lestari | Women's | 8.190 | 2 Q | A Syairah (MAS); W 8.885–1.390 | Lee H-y (TPE); W FS | He CL (CHN); W 7.844–7.942 | A S Rahayu (INA); L 7.980–7.612 | 2nd place, silver medalist(s) |

Speed relay

| Athlete | Event | Qualification | | Quarterfinals | Semifinals | Final / BM | |
| Athlete | Event | Time | Rank | Opposition Time | Opposition Time | Opposition Time | Rank |
|---|---|---|---|---|---|---|---|
| Indonesia 1 Muhammad Fajri Alfian; Aspar Jaelolo; Sabri; Septo Wibowo Siburian | Men's | 19.373 | 1 Q | Thailand 1 (THA); W 20.091–24.003 | China 1 (CHN); W 19.205–19.874 | Indonesia 2 (INA); L FS–18.686 | 2nd place, silver medalist(s) |
| Indonesia 2 Muhammad Hinayah; Veddriq Leonardo; Rindi Sufriyanto; Abu Dzar Yulianto | Men's | 19.982 | 3 Q | Kazakhstan 1 (KAZ); W 19.793–26.018 | China 2 (CHN); W 18.998 –F | Indonesia 1 (INA); W 18.686–FS | 1st place, gold medalist(s) |
| Indonesia 1 Fitriyani; Puji Lestari; Aries Susanti Rahayu; Rajiah Sallsabillah | Women's | 25.016 | 1 Q | Kazakhstan 2 (KAZ); W 27.162–FS | Iran 1 (IRI); W 26.157–31.709 | China 2 (CHN); W 25.452–FS | 1st place, gold medalist(s) |
| Indonesia 2 Nurul Iqamah; Mudji Mulyani; Agustina Sari; Santy Wellyanti | Women's | 28.734 | 4 Q | Iran 1 (IRI); L FS–32.216 | did not advance | | 6 |

Combined

| Athlete | Event | Qualification | | | | | Final | | | | |
| Athlete | Event | Speed Point | Boulder Point | Lead Point | Total | Rank | Speed Point | Boulder Point | Lead Point | Total | Rank |
|---|---|---|---|---|---|---|---|---|---|---|---|
| Kiromal Katibin | Men's | 1 | 19 | 18 | 342 | 7 | did not advance | | | | |
| Seto | Men's | 2 | 14 | 14 | 392 | 8 | did not advance | | | | |
| Ndona Nasugian | Women's | 2 | 15 | 12 | 360 | 9 | did not advance | | | | |
| Widia Fujiyanti | Women's | 4 | 14 | 7 | 392 | 10 | did not advance | | | | |

== Squash ==
Singles

| Athlete | Event | Round of 32 | Round of 16 | Quarterfinals | Semifinals | Final | |
| Athlete | Event | Opposition score | Opposition score | Opposition score | Opposition score | Opposition score | Rank |
|---|---|---|---|---|---|---|---|
| Agung Wilant | Men's | Liu T M (MAC); W 3–2 | L Au (HKG); L 0–3 | did not advance | | | |
| Muhammad Nur Tastaftyan | Men's | I Yuen (MAS); L 0–3 | did not advance | | | | |
| Catur Yuliana | Women's | F Zafar (PAK); W 3–2 | S Subramaniam (MAS); L 0–3 | did not advance | | | |
| Yeni Siti Rohmah | Women's | A Prasertratanakul (THA); W 3–1 | D P Karthik (IND); L 0–3 | did not advance | | | |

Team

| Athlete | Event | Group Stage | | | | | | Semifinal | Final | |
| Athlete | Event | Opposition Score | Opposition Score | Opposition Score | Opposition Score | Opposition Score | Rank | Opposition Score | Opposition Score | Rank |
|---|---|---|---|---|---|---|---|---|---|---|
| Agung Wilant; Muhammad Nur Tastaftyan; Satria Bagus Laksana; Andi Hasanudin | Men's | India (IND); L 0–3 | Qatar (QAT); L 1–2 | Malaysia (MAS); L 0–3 | Singapore (SGP); L 0–3 | Thailand (THA); W 3–0 | 5 | did not advance | | |
| Catur Yuliana; Yeni Siti Rohmah; Irma Maryani; Maudy Wafa Nadiyah | Women's | Hong Kong (HKG); L 0–3 | China (CHN); W 2–1 | India (IND); L 0–3 | Iran (IRI); W 2–1 | Thailand (THA); W 3–0 | 3 | did not advance | | |

== Swimming ==
=== Men ===
| Event | Athlete | Heats | | Final | |
| Event | Athlete | Time | Rank | Time | Rank |
|---|---|---|---|---|---|
| 50 m freestyle | Raymond Sumitra Lukman | 23.66 | 24 | Did not advance | |
| 50 m freestyle | Triady Fauzi Sidiq | 22.95 | 14 | Did not advance | |
| 100 m freestyle | Raymond Sumitra Lukman | 51.86 | 30 | Did not advance | |
| 100 m freestyle | Triady Fauzi Sidiq | 50.62 | 19 | Did not advance | |
| 200 m freestyle | Aflah Fadlan Prawira | 1:50.78 | 11 | Did not advance | |
| 200 m freestyle | Putera Muhammad Randa | 1:53.88 | 18 | Did not advance | |
| 400 m freestyle | Aflah Fadlan Prawira | 3:54.45 | 8 Q | 3:53.01 | 8 |
| 400 m freestyle | Putera Muhammad Randa | 4:04.96 | 15 | Did not advance | |
| 800 m freestyle | Aflah Fadlan Prawira | N/A | | 8:03.87 | 6 |
| 1500 m freestyle | Aflah Fadlan Prawira | N/A | | 15:24.59 | 6 |
| 50 m backstroke | Ricky Anggawijaya | 26.82 | 19 | Did not advance | |
| 50 m backstroke | I Gede Siman Sudartawa | 25.01 | 1 Q | 25.29 | 5 |
| 100 m backstroke | Ricky Anggawijaya | 57.33 | 13 | Did not advance | |
| 100 m backstroke | I Gede Siman Sudartawa | 55.48 | 7 Q | 58.82 | 8 |
| 200 m backstroke | Ricky Anggawijaya | 2:05.59 | 9 | Did not advance | |
| 50 m breaststroke | Indra Gunawan | 28.76 | 17 | Did not advance | |
| 50 m breaststroke | Gagarin Nathaniel Yus | 28.32 | 13 | Did not advance | |
| 100 m breaststroke | Indra Gunawan | 1:05.36 | 23 | Did not advance | |
| 100 m breaststroke | Gagarin Nathaniel Yus | 1:02.42 | 13 | Did not advance | |
| 50 m butterfly | Triady Fauzi Sidiq | 24.46 | 12 | Did not advance | |
| 50 m butterfly | Glenn Victor Sutanto | 24.36 | 10 | Did not advance | |
| 100 m butterfly | Triady Fauzi Sidiq | 53.99 | 11 | Did not advance | |
| 100 m butterfly | Glenn Victor Sutanto | 53.29 | 7 Q | 53.89 | 8 |
| 200 m individual medley | Triady Fauzi Sidiq | 2:03.32 | 8 Q | 2:02.09 | 6 |
| 400 m individual medley | Aflah Fadlan Prawira | 4:29.00 | 10 | Did not advance | |
| 4 × 100 m freestyle relay | Ricky Anggawijaya; Raymond Sumitra Lukman; Triady Fauzi Sidiq; Putera Muhammad Randa | 3:52.14 | 7 Q | 3:25.16 | 7 |
| 4 × 200 m freestyle relay | Ricky Anggawijaya; Aflah Fadlan Prawira; Putera Muhammad Randa; Triady Fauzi Sidiq | DNS | | | |
| 4 × 100 m medley relay | I Gede Siman Sudartawa; Gagarin Nathaniel Yus; Glenn Victor Sutanto; Triady Fauzi Sidiq | 3:40.00 | 5 Q | 3:38.18 | 6 |

=== Women ===
| Event | Athlete | Heats | | Final | |
| Event | Athlete | Time | Rank | Time | Rank |
|---|---|---|---|---|---|
| 50 m freestyle | Anak Agung Istri Kania Ratih Atmaja | 26.23 | 13 | Did not advance | |
| 50 m freestyle | Patricia Yosita Hapsari | 27.25 | 18 | Did not advance | |
| 100 m freestyle | Patricia Yosita Hapsari | 57.40 | 12 | Did not advance | |
| 200 m freestyle | Ressa Kania Dewi | 2:04.78 | 12 | Did not advance | |
| 200 m freestyle | Sagita Putri Krisdewanti | 2:06.75 | 14 | Did not advance | |
| 400 m freestyle | Sagita Putri Krisdewanti | 4:30.06 | 12 | Did not advance | |
| 400 m freestyle | Adinda Larasati Dewi Kirana | 4:29.56 | 11 | Did not advance | |
| 800 m freestyle | Ressa Kania Dewi | N/A | | 9:06.48 | 12 |
| 800 m freestyle | Adinda Larasati Dewi Kirana | N/A | | 9:04.25 | 10 |
| 1500 m freestyle | Ressa Kania Dewi | DNS | | | |
| 50 m backstroke | Anak Agung Istri Kania Ratih Atmaja | 30.32 | 14 | Did not advance | |
| 50 m backstroke | Nurul Fajar Fitriyati | 29.91 | 12 | Did not advance | |
| 100 m backstroke | Yessy Venesia Yosaputra | 1:04.22 | 10 | Did not advance | |
| 100 m backstroke | Nurul Fajar Fitriyati | 1:05.53 | 14 | Did not advance | |
| 200 m backstroke | Nurul Fajar Fitriyati | 2:18.64 | 7 Q | 2:19.38 | 7 |
| 200 m backstroke | Yessy Venesia Yosaputra | 2:20.44 | 11 | Did not advance | |
| 50 m breaststroke | Anandia Treciel Vanessae Evato | | | | |
| 100 m breaststroke | Anandia Treciel Vanessae Evato | | | | |
| 200 m breaststroke | Anandia Treciel Vanessae Evato | | | | |
| 200 m breaststroke | Azzahra Permatahani | | | | |
| 50 m butterfly | Nurul Fajar Fitriyati | | | | |
| 50 m butterfly | Adinda Larasati Dewi Kirana | | | | |
| 100 m butterfly | Nurul Fajar Fitriyati | | | | |
| 100 m butterfly | Adinda Larasati Dewi Kirana | | | | |
| 200 m butterfly | Adinda Larasati Dewi Kirana | | | | |
| 200 m butterfly | Azzahra Permatahani | | | | |
| 200 m individual medley | Ressa Kania Dewi | | | | |
| 200 m individual medley | Azzahra Permatahani | | | | |
| 400 m individual medley | Ressa Kania Dewi | | | | |
| 400 m individual medley | Azzahra Permatahani | | | | |
| 4 × 100 m freestyle relay | Ressa Kania Dewi; Patricia Yosita Hapsari; Adinda Larasati Dewi Kirana; Sagita Putri Krisdewanti | | | | |
| 4 × 200 m freestyle relay | Ressa Kania Dewi; Patricia Yosita Hapsari; Adinda Larasati Dewi Kirana; Sagita Putri Krisdewanti | | | | |
| 4 × 100 m medley relay | Nurul Fajar Fitriyati; Anandia Treciel Vanessae Evato; Adinda Larasati Dewi Kirana; Patricia Yosita Hapsari | | | | |

=== Mixed ===
| Event | Athlete | Heats | | Final | |
| Event | Athlete | Time | Rank | Time | Rank |
|---|---|---|---|---|---|
| 4 × 100 m medley relay | I Gede Siman Sudartawa; Gagarin Nathaniel Yus; Adinda Larasati Dewi Kirana; Patricia Yosita Hapsari | | | | |

== Table tennis ==
Individual

| Athlete | Event | Round 1 | Round 2 | Round of 16 | Quarterfinals | Semifinals | Final | |
| Athlete | Event | Opposition score | Opposition score | Opposition score | Opposition score | Opposition score | Opposition score | Rank |
|---|---|---|---|---|---|---|---|---|
| Ficky Supit Santoso | Men's singles | IM Shaffan (MDV); W 4–0 | S Gnanasekaran (IND); L 2–4 | did not advance | | | | |
| Muhammad Bima Abdi | Men's singles | M Asim (PAK); WO | did not advance | | | | | |
| Kharisma Nur Hawwa | Women's singles | N Kongphet (LAO); W 4–0 | M Kato (JPN); L 0–4 | did not advance | | | | |
| Rina Sintya | Women's singles | S Thiphakone (LAO); W 4–0 | Seo H-w (KOR); L 0–4 | did not advance | | | | |
| Donny Aji; Lilis Indriani | Mixed doubles | Bye | A Amalraj / M Patkar (IND); L 1–3 | did not advance | | | | |
| Muhammad Bima Abdi; Rina Sintya | Mixed doubles | S Mosangsinh / S Thiphakone (LAO); W 3–0 | Lee S-s / Jeon J-h (KOR); L 0^{r}–2 | did not advance | | | | |

Team

| Athlete | Event | Group Stage | | | | | Quarterfinal | Semifinal | Final | |
| Athlete | Event | Opposition Score | Opposition Score | Opposition Score | Opposition Score | Rank | Opposition Score | Opposition Score | Opposition Score | Rank |
|---|---|---|---|---|---|---|---|---|---|---|
| Ficky Supit Santoso; Donny Aji; Deepash Bhagwani; Luki Muhammad Purkani; Muhammad Bima Abdi | Men's | Yemen (YEM); W 3–0 | South Korea (KOR); L 0–3 | Mongolia (MGL); W 3–0 | Hong Kong (HKG); L 0–3 | 3 | did not advance | | | |
| Gustin Dwijayanti; Lilis Indriani; Kharisma Nur Hawwa; Atikah Rahayu; Rina Sintya | Women's | South Korea (KOR); L 0–3 | Macau (MAC); W 3–0 | Chinese Taipei (TPE); L 1–3 | —N/a | 3 | did not advance | | | |

== Taekwondo ==
Pengurus Besar Taekwondo Indonesia (PBTI) entered their athletes into the taekwondo competition at the Games. The last medals won by Indonesia in taekwondo competition at the Asian Games was in 2010 Guangzhou, and this year, PBTI target a gold medal.

Poomsae

| Athlete | Event | Round of 16 | Quarterfinal | Semifinal | Final | |
| Athlete | Event | Opposition Score | Opposition Score | Opposition Score | Opposition Score | Rank |
|---|---|---|---|---|---|---|
| Abdurrahman Wahyu | Men's individual | Sun Shine (MYA); W 8.33–7.93 | Kourosh Bakhtiar (IRI); L 8.19–8.25 | did not advance | | |
| Abdul Rahman Darwin; Akhmad Syaiful Anwar; Maulana Haidir | Men's team | Kazakhstan; W 8.30–7.63 | South Korea; L 8.39–8.63 | did not advance | | |
| Defia Rosmaniar | Women's individual | Wong Ka Yiu (HKG); W 8.22–7.69 | Châu Tuyết Vân (VIE); W 8.46–8.33 | Yun Ji-hye (KOR); W 8.52–8.40 | Marjan Salahshouri (IRI); W 8.58–8.42 | 1st place, gold medalist(s) |
| Ruhil; Rachmania Gunawan Putri; Mutiara Habiba | Women's team | Bye | Philippines; L 8.04–8.07 | did not advance | | |

Kyorugi

| Athlete | Event | Round of 32 | Round of 16 | Quarterfinal | Semifinal | Final | |
| Athlete | Event | Opposition Score | Opposition Score | Opposition Score | Opposition Score | Opposition Score | Rank |
|---|---|---|---|---|---|---|---|
| Reinaldy Atmanegara | Men's −58 kg | Hou Kuang-wu (TPE); L 16–40 | did not advance | | | | |
| Ibrahim Zarman | Men's −63 kg | Bye | Haroon Khan (PAK); W 25–21 | Cho Gang-min (KOR); L 25–36 | did not advance | | |
| Muhammad Saleh | Men's −68 kg | Arcenio Soares (TLS); W 22–11 | Lee Dae-hoon (KOR); L 5–26 | did not advance | | | |
| Dinggo Ardian Prayogo | Men's −80 kg | Hidenori Ebata (JPN); L 20–24 | did not advance | | | | |
| Rizky Anugrah Prasetyo | Men's +80 kg | —N/a | Yang Tsung-yeh (TPE); L 3–23 | did not advance | | | |
| Dhean Titania Fajrin | Women's −49 kg | Hung Yu-ting (TPE); L 4–13 | did not advance | | | | |
| Mariska Halinda | Women's −53 kg | Bye | Maria Madeira Barros (TLS); W 28–3 | Laetitia Aoun (LBN); L 22–23 | did not advance | | |
| Permata Cinta Nadya | Women's −57 kg | Bye | Norah Al-Marri (KSA); W 19–0^{R} | Luo Zongshi (CHN); L 2–28 | did not advance | | |
| Shaleha Fitriana Yusuf | Women's −67 kg | —N/a | Liu Qing (MAC); L 21–25 | did not advance | | | |
| Delva Rizki | Women's +67 kg | —N/a | Lâm Thị Hà Thanh (VIE); L 3–5 | did not advance | | | |

== Tennis ==
Men

| Athlete | Event | Round of 64 | Round of 32 | Round of 16 | Quarterfinals | Semifinals | Final | |
| Athlete | Event | Opposition score | Opposition score | Opposition score | Opposition score | Opposition score | Opposition score | Rank |
|---|---|---|---|---|---|---|---|---|
| Ignatius Anthony Susanto | Singles | MAAK Akbar (PAK); L 5–7, 1–6 | did not advance | | | | | |
| Muhammad Rifqi Fitriadi | Singles | S Bajracharya (NEP); W 6–2, 6–2 | P Gunneswaran (IND); L 2–6, 0–6 | did not advance | | | | |
| David Agung Susanto; Ignatius Anthony Susanto | Doubles | AF Fazeel / AS Waheed (MDV); W 6–1, 6–0 | R Bopanna / D Sharan (IND); L 3–6, 3–6 | did not advance | | | | |
| Justin Barki; Christopher Rungkat | Doubles | Bye | Y Ito / Y Watanuki (JPN); L 4–6, 6–3, [7–10] | did not advance | | | | |

Women

| Athlete | Event | Round of 64 | Round of 32 | Round of 16 | Quarterfinals | Semifinals | Final | |
| Athlete | Event | Opposition score | Opposition score | Opposition score | Opposition score | Opposition score | Opposition score | Rank |
|---|---|---|---|---|---|---|---|---|
| Aldila Sutjiadi | Singles | Bye | P Plipuech (THA); W 3–6, 6–4, 6–4 | M Kato (JPN); W 6–1, 6–0 | Q Wang (CHN); L 4–6, 3–6 | did not advance | | |
| Beatrice Gumulya | Singles | Z Abdul Rasheed (MDV); W 6–0, 6–0 | A Raina (IND); L 2–6, 4–6 | did not advance | | | | |
| Beatrice Gumulya; Jessy Rompies | Doubles | —N/a | E Hayashi / M Uchijima (JPN); L 6–1, 4–6, [9–11] | did not advance | | | | |
| Joleta Budiman; Deria Nur Haliza | Doubles | —N/a | S Mansoor / U Suhail (PAK); W 6–3, 7–6^{(7–4)} | N Lertpitaksinchai / P Plipuech (THA); L 0–6, 0–6 | did not advance | | | |

Mixed

| Athlete | Event | Round of 64 | Round of 32 | Round of 16 | Quarterfinals | Semifinals | Final | |
| Athlete | Event | Opposition score | Opposition score | Opposition score | Opposition score | Opposition score | Opposition score | Rank |
|---|---|---|---|---|---|---|---|---|
| Aldila Sutjiadi; Christopher Rungkat | Doubles | Bye | SM Khan / M Murtaza (PAK); W 6–3, 6–2 | N Lertpitaksinchai / Sa Ratiwatana (THA); W 7–5, 6–1 | A Raina / R Bopanna (IND); W 6–4, 1–6, [10–6] | E Hayashi / K Uesugi (JPN); W 7–6^{(7–3)}, 6–4 | L Kumkhum / S Ratiwatana (THA); W 6–4, 5–7, [10–7] | 1st place, gold medalist(s) |
| Jessy Rompies; David Agung Susanto | Doubles | J-h Choi / Y-s Kim (KOR); L 5–7, 1–6 | did not advance | | | | | |

== Triathlon ==
Indonesian Triathlon Federation entered six triathletes (3 men's and 3 women's) to compete at the Games.

Individual

| Athlete | Event | Swim (1.5 km) | Trans 1 | Bike (39.6 km) | Trans 2 | Run (10 km) | Total Time | Rank |
|---|---|---|---|---|---|---|---|---|
| Muhammad Ahlul Firman | Men's | 20:10 | 0:27 | 56:36 | 0:26 | 38:23 | 1:56:02 | 15 |
| Sayaka Cakravastia | Women's | 27:36 | 0:34 | 1:13:57 | 0:26 | 56:21 | 2:38:54 | 17 |

Mixed relay

| Athletes | Event | Total Times per Athlete (Swim 300 m, Bike 6.3 km, Run 2.1 km) | Total Group Time | Rank |
|---|---|---|---|---|
| Andi Gumilang Lawello; Asihta Aulia Azzahra; Eva Desiana; Jauhari Johan | Mixed relay | 23:40; 28:02; 28:47; 23:32 | 1:44:01 | 9 |

== Volleyball ==
=== Beach volleyball ===
| Athlete | Event | Preliminary | | Round of 16 | Quarterfinals | Semifinals | Final / BM | |
| Athlete | Event | Oppositions scores | Rank | Opposition score | Opposition score | Opposition score | Opposition score | Rank |
|---|---|---|---|---|---|---|---|---|
| Ade Candra Rachmawan; Mohammad Ashfiya | Men's tournament | Asifi – Ahmadi (AFG): W 2–0; Al-Housni – Al Shereiqi (OMA): W 2–0; Hsieh – Wang (TPE): W 2–0 | 1 Q | Jongklang – Khaolumtarn (THA); W 2–0 | Wu – Aboduhalikejiang (CHN); W 2–1 | Ramadhan – Pribadi (INA); W 2–0 | Janko – Samba (QAT); L 0–2 | 2nd place, silver medalist(s) |
| Gilang Ramadhan; Danangsyah Pribadi | Men's tournament | Lau – Wong (HKG): W 2–0; Alarqan – Al-Qishawi (PLE): W 2–0; Hossain – Ali (BAN): W 2–0 | 1 Q | Yakovlev – Bogatu (KAZ); W 2–1 | Al-Jalbubi – Al-Hashmi (OMA); W 2–0 | Rachmawan – Ashfiya (INA); L 0–2 | Gao – Li (CHN); W 2–1 | 3rd place, bronze medalist(s) |
| Desi Ratnasari; Yokebed Purari Eka | Women's tournament | Rachenko – Yeropkina (KAZ): W 2–0; Caminha – de Sousa (TLS): W 2–0; Futami – Hasegawa (JPN): L 1–2; Numwong – Hongpak (THA): W 2–1 | 2 Q | Yu – Pan (TPE); W 2–0 | Wang – Xia (CHN); L 0–2 | did not advance | | |
| Dhita Juliana; Putu Dini Jasita Utami | Women's tournament | Wong – Ng (HKG): W 2–0; Nguyen – Huynh (VIE): W 2–0; Mashkova – Tsimbalova (KAZ): L 0–2; Radarong – Udomchavee (THA):L 1–2 | 3 Q | Kou – Liu (TPE); W 2–0 | Futami – Hasegawa (JPN); W 2–0 | Wang – Xia (CHN); L 1–2 | Mashkova – Tsimbalova (KAZ); W 2–0 | 3rd place, bronze medalist(s) |

=== Indoor volleyball ===
| Team | Event | Group Stage | | Playoffs | Quarterfinals | Semifinals / Pl. | Final / BM / Pl. | |
| Team | Event | Oppositions scores | Rank | Opposition score | Opposition score | Opposition score | Opposition score | Rank |
|---|---|---|---|---|---|---|---|---|
| Indonesia men's | Men's tournament | Saudi Arabia: L 1–3; Kyrgyzstan: W 3–0 | 2 Q | Thailand; W 3–2 | South Korea; L 0–3 | Did not advance | Japan; L 2–3 | 6 |
| Indonesia women's | Women's tournament | Japan: L 0–3; Hong Kong: W 3–1; Philippines: W 3–1; Thailand: L 1–3 | 3 Q | —N/a | South Korea; L 0–3 | Vietnam; L 1–3 | Philippines; W 3–1 | 7 |

==== Men's tournament ====
Team roster

The following is the Indonesia roster in the men's volleyball tournament of the 2018 Asian Games.

Head coach: Samsul Jais

| No. | Name | Date of birth | Height | Weight | Spike | Block | Club |
|---|---|---|---|---|---|---|---|
| 1 | Doni Haryono | 21 February 1999 | 1.88 m (6 ft 2 in) | 75 kg (165 lb) | 336 cm (132 in) | 322 cm (127 in) | (Indonesia) PPOP Jateng |
| 3 | Ardian Sigit | 1 March 1993 | 1.90 m (6 ft 3 in) | 77 kg (170 lb) | 350 cm (140 in) | 320 cm (130 in) | (Indonesia) TNI AU |
| 4 | Mahfud Nurcahyadi | 13 March 1989 | 1.91 m (6 ft 3 in) | 66 kg (146 lb) | 338 cm (133 in) | 325 cm (128 in) | (Indonesia) Samator |
| 6 | Muhammad Malizi | 29 September 1994 | 1.87 m (6 ft 2 in) | 72 kg (159 lb) | 330 cm (130 in) | 300 cm (120 in) | (Indonesia) TNI AL |
| 7 | Delly Dwi Putra Heryanto | 28 October 1995 | 1.68 m (5 ft 6 in) | 64 kg (141 lb) | 300 cm (120 in) | 290 cm (110 in) | (Indonesia) Pertamina |
| 8 | Galih Bayu Saputra | 22 February 1993 | 1.89 m (6 ft 2 in) | 72 kg (159 lb) | 330 cm (130 in) | 325 cm (128 in) | (Indonesia) Samator |
| 9 | Yuda Mardiansyah Putra | 22 June 1996 | 1.92 m (6 ft 4 in) | 82 kg (181 lb) | 339 cm (133 in) | 327 cm (129 in) | (Indonesia) Samator |
| 11 | Rendy Febriant Tamamilang | 12 February 1996 | 1.89 m (6 ft 2 in) | 72 kg (159 lb) | 330 cm (130 in) | 320 cm (130 in) | (Indonesia) Samator |
| 12 | Rivan Nurmulki | 16 July 1995 | 1.95 m (6 ft 5 in) | 76 kg (168 lb) | 350 cm (140 in) | 335 cm (132 in) | (Indonesia) Samator |
| 14 | Nizar Julfikar Munawar | 12 September 1994 | 1.84 m (6 ft 0 in) | 65 kg (143 lb) | 320 cm (130 in) | 290 cm (110 in) | (Indonesia) Samator |
| 16 | Ramzil Huda | 7 November 1987 | 1.96 m (6 ft 5 in) | 80 kg (180 lb) | 340 cm (130 in) | 320 cm (130 in) | (Indonesia) TNI AU |
| 17 | Aji Maulana (c) | 11 October 1990 | 1.85 m (6 ft 1 in) | 70 kg (150 lb) | 330 cm (130 in) | 310 cm (120 in) | (Indonesia) Mars |
| 18 | Hernanda Zulfi | 27 January 1997 | 1.98 m (6 ft 6 in) | 82 kg (181 lb) | 330 cm (130 in) | 320 cm (130 in) | (Indonesia) Indomaret |
| 19 | Veleg Dhany Ristan Krisnawan | 24 October 1990 | 1.73 m (5 ft 8 in) | 73 kg (161 lb) | 300 cm (120 in) | 290 cm (110 in) | (Indonesia) BNI |

Pool A

| Pos | Team | Pld | W | L | Pts | SW | SL | SR | SPW | SPL | SPR | Qualification |
|---|---|---|---|---|---|---|---|---|---|---|---|---|
| 1 | Saudi Arabia | 2 | 2 | 0 | 6 | 6 | 2 | 3.000 | 186 | 167 | 1.114 | Classification for 1–12 |
| 2 | Indonesia | 2 | 1 | 1 | 3 | 4 | 3 | 1.333 | 164 | 149 | 1.101 | Classification for 1–12 |
| 3 | Kyrgyzstan | 2 | 0 | 2 | 0 | 1 | 6 | 0.167 | 136 | 170 | 0.800 | Classification for 13–20 |

Source: OCA

| Date | Time | | Score | | Set 1 | Set 2 | Set 3 | Set 4 | Set 5 | Total | Report |
|---|---|---|---|---|---|---|---|---|---|---|---|
| 22 Aug | 19:00 | Indonesia | 1–3 | Saudi Arabia | 23–25 | 25–16 | 19–25 | 22–25 | | 89–91 | Report |
| 24 Aug | 16:30 | Kyrgyzstan | 0–3 | Indonesia | 21–25 | 17–25 | 20–25 | | | 58–75 | Report |
| 26 Aug | 16:30 | Thailand | 2–3 | Indonesia | 22–25 | 23–25 | 25–23 | 25–22 | 12–15 | 107–110 | Report |
| 28 Aug | 16:30 | Indonesia | 0–3 | South Korea | 22–25 | 18–25 | 18–25 | | | 58–75 | Report |
| 01 Sep | 19:00 | Indonesia | 2–3 | Japan | 33–35 | 25–22 | 21–25 | 27–25 | 12–15 | 118–122 | Report |

==== Women's tournament ====
Team roster

The following is the Indonesian roster in the women's volleyball tournament of the 2018 Asian Games.

Head coach: Mohamad Amsori

| No. | Name | Date of birth | Height | Weight | Spike | Block | Club |
|---|---|---|---|---|---|---|---|
| 1 | Yulis Indahyan (L) | 2 March 1990 | 1.67 m (5 ft 6 in) | 63 kg (139 lb) | 270 cm (110 in) | 260 cm (100 in) | (Indonesia) Bank Jatim |
| 3 | Megawati Hangestri Pertiwi | 20 September 1999 | 1.85 m (6 ft 1 in) | 78 kg (172 lb) | 278 cm (109 in) | 270 cm (110 in) | (Indonesia) Bank Jatim |
| 5 | Berllian Marsheilla (L) | 22 December 1989 | 1.68 m (5 ft 6 in) | 60 kg (130 lb) | 270 cm (110 in) | 260 cm (100 in) | (Indonesia) Wahana |
| 6 | Yolana Bheta Pangestika | 17 July 1997 | 1.73 m (5 ft 8 in) | 64 kg (141 lb) | 280 cm (110 in) | 270 cm (110 in) | (Indonesia) Bank Jatim |
| 7 | Amalia Fajrina Nabila (C) | 26 April 1994 | 1.75 m (5 ft 9 in) | 68 kg (150 lb) | 278 cm (109 in) | 265 cm (104 in) | (Indonesia) Popsivo |
| 8 | Amasya Angraini Manganang | 9 April 1989 | 1.70 m (5 ft 7 in) | 80 kg (180 lb) | 280 cm (110 in) | 270 cm (110 in) | (Indonesia) LNG Bontang |
| 9 | Aprilia Santini Manganang | 27 April 1992 | 1.70 m (5 ft 7 in) | 76 kg (168 lb) | 310 cm (120 in) | 300 cm (120 in) | (Indonesia) Alko |
| 11 | Nandita Ayu Salsabila | 12 July 1997 | 1.73 m (5 ft 8 in) | 62 kg (137 lb) | 273 cm (107 in) | 250 cm (98 in) | (Indonesia) Barata |
| 12 | Arsela Nuari Purnama | 21 January 1997 | 1.77 m (5 ft 10 in) | 64 kg (141 lb) | 277 cm (109 in) | 265 cm (104 in) | (Indonesia) Poposivo |
| 13 | Tri Retno Mutiara Lutfi | 16 November 1997 | 1.75 m (5 ft 9 in) | 64 kg (141 lb) | 275 cm (108 in) | 250 cm (98 in) | (Indonesia) Wahana |
| 14 | Asih Titi Pangestuti | 14 November 1993 | 1.71 m (5 ft 7 in) | 60 kg (130 lb) | 265 cm (104 in) | 227 cm (89 in) | (Indonesia) Bank Jatim |
| 15 | Hany Budiarti | 20 August 1996 | 1.76 m (5 ft 9 in) | 62 kg (137 lb) | 270 cm (110 in) | 265 cm (104 in) | (Indonesia) TNI AU |
| 17 | Wilda Sugandi | 7 February 1995 | 1.78 m (5 ft 10 in) | 64 kg (141 lb) | 275 cm (108 in) | 250 cm (98 in) | (Indonesia) Alko |
| 18 | Novia Andriyanti | 15 November 1991 | 1.65 m (5 ft 5 in) | 64 kg (141 lb) | 270 cm (110 in) | 265 cm (104 in) | (Indonesia) Pertamina |

Pool A

| Pos | Team | Pld | W | L | Pts | SW | SL | SR | SPW | SPL | SPR | Qualification |
|---|---|---|---|---|---|---|---|---|---|---|---|---|
| 1 | Thailand | 4 | 4 | 0 | 12 | 12 | 1 | 12.000 | 322 | 221 | 1.457 | Quarterfinals |
| 2 | Japan | 4 | 3 | 1 | 9 | 9 | 3 | 3.000 | 290 | 197 | 1.472 | Quarterfinals |
| 3 | Indonesia | 4 | 2 | 2 | 6 | 7 | 8 | 0.875 | 315 | 328 | 0.960 | Quarterfinals |
| 4 | Philippines | 4 | 1 | 3 | 3 | 4 | 9 | 0.444 | 260 | 310 | 0.839 | Quarterfinals |
| 5 | Hong Kong | 4 | 0 | 4 | 0 | 1 | 12 | 0.083 | 190 | 321 | 0.592 | Classification for 9–11 |

Source: OCA

| Date | Time | | Score | | Set 1 | Set 2 | Set 3 | Set 4 | Set 5 | Total | Report |
|---|---|---|---|---|---|---|---|---|---|---|---|
| 19 Aug | 19:00 | Japan | 3–0 | Indonesia | 25–20 | 25–11 | 25–19 | | | 75–50 | Report |
| 21 Aug | 19:00 | Hong Kong | 1–3 | Indonesia | 25–21 | 13–25 | 18–25 | 14–25 | | 70–96 | Report |
| 25 Aug | 19:00 | Indonesia | 3–1 | Philippines | 25–20 | 25–20 | 24–26 | 25–22 | | 99–88 | Report |
| 27 Aug | 16:30 | Indonesia | 1–3 | Thailand | 19–25 | 25–20 | 13–25 | 13–25 | | 70–95 | Report |
| 29 Aug | 16:30 | Indonesia | 0–3 | South Korea | 22–25 | 13–25 | 18–25 | | | 53–75 | Report |
| 31 Aug | 09:00 | Vietnam | 3–1 | Indonesia | 29–27 | 18–25 | 25–22 | 25–22 | | 97–96 | Report |
| 01 Sep | 10:00 | Indonesia | 3–1 | Philippines | 25–17 | 23–25 | 25–19 | 25–20 | | 98–81 | Report |

== Water polo ==
Summary

Key:

- FT – After full-time.
- P – Match decided by penalty-shootout.

| Team | Event | Group Stage | | | | | | Quarterfinal | Semifinal / Pl. | Final / BM / Pl. | |
| Team | Event | Opposition score | Opposition score | Opposition score | Opposition score | Opposition score | Rank | Opposition score | Opposition score | Opposition score | Rank |
|---|---|---|---|---|---|---|---|---|---|---|---|
| Indonesia men's | Men's tournament | Saudi Arabia; D 12–12 | China; L 2–19 | Japan; L 7–24 | Hong Kong; W 11–8 | —N/a | 4 Q | Kazakhstan; L 4–20 | South Korea; L 7–15 | Saudi Arabia; L 8–12 | 8 |
| Indonesia women's | Women's tournament | Japan; L 4–15 | Hong Kong; W 9–8 | China; L 4–20 | Kazakhstan; L 6–19 | Thailand; L 7–20 | 5 | —N/a | | | 5 |

=== Men's tournament ===
Team roster

Head coach: (Serbia) Milos Sakovic

1. Mochammad Rafi Alfariz (GK)
2. Beby Tarigan (CB)
3. M Hamid Firdaus (D)
4. Silvester Manik (D)
5. Erlangga Andaru Rinaldi (D)
6. Andi Muhammad Uwayzulqarni (D)
7. Yusuf Budiman (CF)
8. Reza Auditya Putra (D) (C)
9. Delvin Felliciano (CF)
10. Ridjkie Mulia (D)
11. Rian Rinaldo (D)
12. Zaenal Arifin (CB)
13. Novian Dwi Putra (GK)

Group B

| Pos | Team | Pld | W | D | L | GF | GA | GD | Pts | Qualification |
|---|---|---|---|---|---|---|---|---|---|---|
| 1 | Japan | 4 | 4 | 0 | 0 | 79 | 15 | +64 | 8 | Quarterfinals |
| 2 | China | 4 | 3 | 0 | 1 | 63 | 22 | +41 | 6 | Quarterfinals |
| 3 | Saudi Arabia | 4 | 1 | 1 | 2 | 33 | 55 | −22 | 3 (Note: Head-to-head result: KSA 12–12 INA. Goal difference against the highest placed team (JPN): KSA −16, INA −17.) | Quarterfinals |
| 4 | Indonesia | 4 | 1 | 1 | 2 | 32 | 63 | −31 | 3 | Quarterfinals |
| 5 | Hong Kong | 4 | 0 | 0 | 4 | 17 | 69 | −52 | 0 | |

Source: OCA
Notes:

| 25 August; 15:00 | Saudi Arabia | 12–12 | Indonesia | Gelora Bung Karno Aquatic Stadium, Jakarta; Referees: Safabakhsh (IRI), Flahive (AUS) |
| 25 August; 15:00 | Score by quarters: 1–3, 4–4, 3–4, 4–1 | | | Gelora Bung Karno Aquatic Stadium, Jakarta; Referees: Safabakhsh (IRI), Flahive (AUS) |
| 25 August; 15:00 | Al-Dughather 6 | Goals | Harahap 4 | Gelora Bung Karno Aquatic Stadium, Jakarta; Referees: Safabakhsh (IRI), Flahive (AUS) |

| 26 August; 14:30 | Indonesia | 2–19 | China | Gelora Bung Karno Aquatic Stadium, Jakarta; Referees: Tan (SGP), Flahive (AUS) |
| 26 August; 14:30 | Score by quarters: 0–4, 0–6, 0–4, 2–5 | | | Gelora Bung Karno Aquatic Stadium, Jakarta; Referees: Tan (SGP), Flahive (AUS) |
| 26 August; 14:30 | Firdaus, Manik 1 | Goals | Chen Z. 5 | Gelora Bung Karno Aquatic Stadium, Jakarta; Referees: Tan (SGP), Flahive (AUS) |

| 27 August; 17:10 | Indonesia | 7–24 | Japan | Gelora Bung Karno Aquatic Stadium, Jakarta; Referees: Jiathornwattana (THA), Štampalija (CRO) |
| 27 August; 17:10 | Score by quarters: 3–9, 1–8, 2–4, 1–3 | | | Gelora Bung Karno Aquatic Stadium, Jakarta; Referees: Jiathornwattana (THA), Štampalija (CRO) |
| 27 August; 17:10 | Harahap 4 | Goals | Inaba 7 | Gelora Bung Karno Aquatic Stadium, Jakarta; Referees: Jiathornwattana (THA), Štampalija (CRO) |

| 29 August; 17:10 | Hong Kong | 8–11 | Indonesia | Gelora Bung Karno Aquatic Stadium, Jakarta; Referees: Stavridis (GRE), Alexandrescu (ROU) |
| 29 August; 17:10 | Score by quarters: 0–3, 3–3, 2–3, 3–2 | | | Gelora Bung Karno Aquatic Stadium, Jakarta; Referees: Stavridis (GRE), Alexandrescu (ROU) |
| 29 August; 17:10 | Fung K.Chu., Chan 3 | Goals | Harahap 5 | Gelora Bung Karno Aquatic Stadium, Jakarta; Referees: Stavridis (GRE), Alexandrescu (ROU) |

Quarter-final

| 30 August; 16:30 | Kazakhstan | 20–4 | Indonesia | Gelora Bung Karno Aquatic Stadium, Jakarta; Referees: Tan (SGP), Tahara (JPN) |
| 30 August; 16:30 | Score by quarters: 4–3, 5–0, 6–1, 5–0 | | | Gelora Bung Karno Aquatic Stadium, Jakarta; Referees: Tan (SGP), Tahara (JPN) |
| 30 August; 16:30 | Altayev 5 | Goals | four players 1 | Gelora Bung Karno Aquatic Stadium, Jakarta; Referees: Tan (SGP), Tahara (JPN) |

Classification semifinal (5–8)

| 31 August; 10:20 | South Korea | 15–7 | Indonesia | Gelora Bung Karno Aquatic Stadium, Jakarta; Referees: Tahara (JPN), Salnichenko (KAZ) |
| 31 August; 10:20 | Score by quarters: 4–2, 3–3, 5–1, 3–1 | | | Gelora Bung Karno Aquatic Stadium, Jakarta; Referees: Tahara (JPN), Salnichenko (KAZ) |
| 31 August; 10:20 | Park 6 | Goals | Firdaus, Harahap 2 | Gelora Bung Karno Aquatic Stadium, Jakarta; Referees: Tahara (JPN), Salnichenko (KAZ) |

Seventh place game

| 1 September; 9:00 | Saudi Arabia | 12–8 | Indonesia | Gelora Bung Karno Aquatic Stadium, Jakarta; Referees: Han (KOR), Tahara (JPN) |
| 1 September; 9:00 | Score by quarters: 3–0, 2–3, 0–2, 7–3 | | | Gelora Bung Karno Aquatic Stadium, Jakarta; Referees: Han (KOR), Tahara (JPN) |
| 1 September; 9:00 | Al-Malki 4 | Goals | Budiman, Arifin 2 | Gelora Bung Karno Aquatic Stadium, Jakarta; Referees: Han (KOR), Tahara (JPN) |

=== Women's tournament ===
Team roster

Head coach: (Serbia) Zoran Kontic

1. Ayudya Suidarwanty Pratiwi (GK)
2. Sarah Manzilina (CF)
3. Alya Nadira Trifiansyah (D)
4. Hanna Firdaus (D)
5. Ivy Nernie Priscilla (CB)
6. Nyoman Ayu Savitri Arsana (D)
7. Upiet Sarumanah (CF)
8. Ariel Dyah Cininta Siwabessy (D) (C)
9. Glindra Patricia Legawa (D)
10. Febrika Indirawati (CB)
11. Rani Raida (D)
12. Siti Balkis (CF)
13. Dinda Nur Asmarandana (GK)

Round robin

| Pos | Team | Pld | W | D | L | GF | GA | GD | Pts |
|---|---|---|---|---|---|---|---|---|---|
| 1 | China | 5 | 5 | 0 | 0 | 76 | 24 | +52 | 10 |
| 2 | Kazakhstan | 5 | 4 | 0 | 1 | 70 | 34 | +36 | 8 |
| 3 | Japan | 5 | 3 | 0 | 2 | 84 | 36 | +48 | 6 |
| 4 | Thailand | 5 | 2 | 0 | 3 | 53 | 62 | −9 | 4 |
| 5 | Indonesia | 5 | 1 | 0 | 4 | 30 | 82 | −52 | 2 |
| 6 | Hong Kong | 5 | 0 | 0 | 5 | 22 | 97 | −75 | 0 |

Source: OCA

| 16 August; 14:30 | Japan | 15–4 | Indonesia | Gelora Bung Karno Aquatic Stadium, Jakarta; Referees: Štampalija (CRO), Tan (SGP) |
| 16 August; 14:30 | Score by quarters: 5–2, 2–1, 3–0, 5–1 | | | Gelora Bung Karno Aquatic Stadium, Jakarta; Referees: Štampalija (CRO), Tan (SGP) |
| 16 August; 14:30 | Sakanoue 4 | Goals | four players 1 | Gelora Bung Karno Aquatic Stadium, Jakarta; Referees: Štampalija (CRO), Tan (SGP) |

| 17 August; 14:30 | Indonesia | 9–8 | Hong Kong | Gelora Bung Karno Aquatic Stadium, Jakarta; Referees: Tahara (JPN), Salnichenko (KAZ) |
| 17 August; 14:30 | Score by quarters: 1–3, 1–2, 1–1, 6–2 | | | Gelora Bung Karno Aquatic Stadium, Jakarta; Referees: Tahara (JPN), Salnichenko (KAZ) |
| 17 August; 14:30 | Savitri, Siwabessy, Legawa 2 | Goals | Chan, Mak 4 | Gelora Bung Karno Aquatic Stadium, Jakarta; Referees: Tahara (JPN), Salnichenko (KAZ) |

| 19 August; 15:50 | China | 20–4 | Indonesia | Gelora Bung Karno Aquatic Stadium, Jakarta; Referees: Jiathornwattana (THA), Salnichenko (KAZ) |
| 19 August; 15:50 | Score by quarters: 7–0, 7–3, 3–1, 3–0 | | | Gelora Bung Karno Aquatic Stadium, Jakarta; Referees: Jiathornwattana (THA), Salnichenko (KAZ) |
| 19 August; 15:50 | Xiong, Zhang D., Chen 3 | Goals | Siwabessy 2 | Gelora Bung Karno Aquatic Stadium, Jakarta; Referees: Jiathornwattana (THA), Salnichenko (KAZ) |

| 20 August; 14:30 | Indonesia | 6–19 | Kazakhstan | Gelora Bung Karno Aquatic Stadium, Jakarta; Referees: Tahara (JPN), Ni (CHN) |
| 20 August; 14:30 | Score by quarters: 0–5, 0–2, 2–7, 4–5 | | | Gelora Bung Karno Aquatic Stadium, Jakarta; Referees: Tahara (JPN), Ni (CHN) |
| 20 August; 14:30 | Manzilina 2 | Goals | Mirshina 5 | Gelora Bung Karno Aquatic Stadium, Jakarta; Referees: Tahara (JPN), Ni (CHN) |

| 21 August; 14:30 | Thailand | 20–7 | Indonesia | Gelora Bung Karno Aquatic Stadium, Jakarta; Referees: Ni (CHN), Flahive (AUS) |
| 21 August; 14:30 | Score by quarters: 5–1, 3–1, 8–2, 4–3 | | | Gelora Bung Karno Aquatic Stadium, Jakarta; Referees: Ni (CHN), Flahive (AUS) |
| 21 August; 14:30 | Thinwilai 7 | Goals | Balkis 2 | Gelora Bung Karno Aquatic Stadium, Jakarta; Referees: Ni (CHN), Flahive (AUS) |

== Weightlifting ==
All Indonesia Weightlifting, Bodybuilding & Powerlifting Association prepared 13 weightlifters (7 men's and 6 women's) including three Olympics medalists to compete at the Games.

Men

| Athlete | Event | Snatch | | Clean & Jerk | | Total | Rank |
| Athlete | Event | Result | Rank | Result | Rank | Total | Rank |
|---|---|---|---|---|---|---|---|
| Surahmat bin Suwoto Wijoyo | −56 kg | 119 | 5 | 153 | 2 | 272 | 3rd place, bronze medalist(s) |
| Eko Yuli Irawan | −62 kg | 141 | 1 | 170 | 1 | 311 | 1st place, gold medalist(s) |
| Muhamad Purkon | −62 kg | 130 | 5 | 152 | 8 | 282 | 8 |
| Triyatno | −69 kg | 147 | 2 | 182 | 4 | 329 | 4 |
| Deni | −69 kg | 141 | 8 | 177 | 8 | 318 | 7 |
| Rahmat Erwin Abdullah | −77 kg | 142 | 11 | 172 | 9 | 314 | 4 |
| I Ketut Ariana | −77 kg | DNS | | | | | |

Women

| Athlete | Event | Snatch | | Clean & Jerk | | Total | Rank |
| Athlete | Event | Result | Rank | Result | Rank | Total | Rank |
|---|---|---|---|---|---|---|---|
| Sri Wahyuni Agustiani | −48 kg | 88 | 1 | 107 | 2 | 195 | 2nd place, silver medalist(s) |
| Yolanda Putri | −48 kg | 72 | 8 | 90 | 10 | 162 | 10 |
| Syarah Anggraini | −53 kg | 90 | 3 | 107 | 6 | 197 | 6 |
| Acchedya Jagaddhita | −58 kg | 93 | 4 | 115 | 6 | 208 | 5 |
| Yurifah Melsandi | −69 kg | 86 | 6 | 115 | 6 | 201 | 6 |
| Nurul Akmal | +75 kg | 116 | 6 | 137 | 6 | 253 | 6 |

== Wrestling ==
Key:

- F – Victory by fall.
- PP – Decision by points – the loser with technical points.
- PO – Decision by points – the loser without technical points.
- ST – Great superiority – the loser without technical points and a margin of victory of at least 8 (Greco-Roman) or 10 (freestyle) points.

Men's freestyle

| Athlete | Event | Qualification | Round of 16 | Quarterfinal | Semifinal | Repechage 1 | Repechage 2 | Final / BM | |
| Athlete | Event | Opposition Result | Opposition Result | Opposition Result | Opposition Result | Opposition Result | Opposition Result | Opposition Result | Rank |
|---|---|---|---|---|---|---|---|---|---|
| Eko Roni Saputra | −57 kg | Bye | C Divoshan (SRI); W 10–0 | Liu MH (CHN); L 5–10 | did not advance | | | | 9 |
| Ardiansyah Darmansyah | −65 kg | Bye | B Borjakow (TKM); L 1–11 | did not advance | | | | | 18 |
| Rizki Dermawan | −74 kg | A G Qaderi (AFG); L 4–6^{F} | did not advance | | | | | | 16 |
| Fahriansyah | −86 kg | Bye | H Yazdani (IRI); L 0–10 | did not advance | | Bye | P Kumar (IND); L 0–11 | Did not advance | 18 |
| Ronald Lumban Toruan | −97 kg | —N/a | Kim J-g (KOR); L 0–10 | did not advance | | | —N/a | Did not advance | 11 |
| Dimas Septo Anugraha | −125 kg | —N/a | D Modzmanashvili (UZB); L 0–10 | did not advance | | | —N/a | Did not advance | 12 |

Men's Greco-Roman

| Athlete | Event | Round of 16 | Quarterfinal | Semifinal | Repechage | Final / BM | |
| Athlete | Event | Opposition Result | Opposition Result | Opposition Result | Opposition Result | Opposition Result | Rank |
|---|---|---|---|---|---|---|---|
| Hasan Sidik | −60 kg | S Ota (JPN); L 0–8 | did not advance | | M Mardani (IRI); L 0–9 | Did not advance | 14 |
| Muhammad Aliansyah | −67 kg | Kim M-c (PRK); W 2–2 ^{PP} | Zhang GG (CHN); L 0–7 | did not advance | | | 9 |
| Andika Sulaeman | −77 kg | B Nalgiev (UZB); L 0–9 | did not advance | | | | 13 |
| Lulut Gilang Saputra | −87 kg | S Shirdakov (KGZ); WO | did not advance | | | | 12 |
| Andika Sulaeman | −97 kg | Bye | A A Heidari (IRI); L 0–8 | did not advance | | | 9 |
| Papang Ramadhani | −130 kg | Bye | N Tinaliyev (KAZ); L 0–8 | Did not advance | Bye | A Sonoda (JPN); L 0–2^{F} | 5 |

Women's freestyle

| Athlete | Event | Round of 16 | Quarterfinal | Semifinal | Repechage | Final / BM | |
| Athlete | Event | Opposition Result | Opposition Result | Opposition Result | Opposition Result | Opposition Result | Rank |
|---|---|---|---|---|---|---|---|
| Eka Setiawati | −50 kg | Bye | Y Irie (JPN); L 0–8^{F} | Did not advance | Bye | Kim S-h (PRK); L 0–10 | 5 |
| Dewi Ulfah | −53 kg | Phạm T H P (VIE); L 3–5 | did not advance | | | | 10 |
| Mutiara Ayuningtias | −57 kg | N Esenbaeva (UZB); L 0–7^{F} | did not advance | | | | 11 |
| Dewi Atiya | −62 kg | A Kassymova (KAZ); L 0–10 | did not advance | | | | 10 |
| Desi Sinta | −68 kg | Bye | Chen W-l (TPE); L 5–11 | did not advance | | | 8 |
| Ridha Wahdaniyaty Ridwan | −76 kg | A M Kyzy (KGZ); L 0–12 | did not advance | | —N/a | Did not advance | 9 |

== Wushu ==
Taolu

| Athlete | Event | Event 1 | | Event 2 | | Total | Rank |
| Athlete | Event | Result | Rank | Result | Rank | Total | Rank |
|---|---|---|---|---|---|---|---|
| Edgar Xavier Marvelo | Men's changquan | 9.72 | 2 | —N/a | | 9.72 | 2nd place, silver medalist(s) |
| Harris Horatius | Men's nanquan and nangun | 9.50 | 13 | 9.71 | 2 | 19.21 | 9 |
| Bobie Valentinus Gunawan | Men's taijiquan and taijijian | 9.69 | 6 | 9.60 | 10 | 19.29 | 8 |
| Achmad Hulaefi | Men's daoshu and gunshu | 9.70 | 3 | 9.71 | 3 | 19.41 | 3rd place, bronze medalist(s) |
| Felda Elvira Santoso | Women's changquan | 9.45 | 6 | —N/a | | 9.45 | 6 |
| Juwita Niza Wasni | Women's nanquan and nandao | 9.67 | 4 | 9.30 | 10 | 18.97 | 8 |
| Lindswell Kwok | Women's taijiquan and taijijian | 9.75 | 1 | 9.75 | 1 | 19.50 | 1st place, gold medalist(s) |

Sanda

| Athlete | Event | Round of 32 | Round of 16 | Quarterfinal | Semifinal | Final | |
| Athlete | Event | Opposition Score | Opposition Score | Opposition Score | Opposition Score | Opposition Score | Rank |
|---|---|---|---|---|---|---|---|
| Yusuf Widiyanto | Men's –56 kg | Bye | R Sobhani (IRI); W 2–1 | Hong M-j (KOR); W 2–1 | Shen GS (CHN); L 0–2 | Did not advance | 3rd place, bronze medalist(s) |
| Haris Sofyan | Men's –60 kg | M Tharu (NEP); W 0–0 ^{TV} | S B Pratap Singh (IND); L 1–2 | did not advance | | | |
| Yudi Cahyadi | Men's –65 kg | —N/a | F Zafari (IRI); L 0–2 | did not advance | | | |
| Puja Riyaya | Men's –70 kg | —N/a | N Habibi (AFG); W 2–0 | P Kumar (IND); W 2–1 | Shi ZW (CHN); L 0–2 | Did not advance | 3rd place, bronze medalist(s) |
| Selviah Pertiwi | Women's –52 kg | —N/a | Bye | D Wally (PHI); L 0–2 | did not advance | | |
| Mei Kurniati | Women's –60 kg | —N/a | Bye | Cai YY (CHN); L 0–2 | did not advance | | |

Key: * TV – Technical victory.

== See also ==
- Indonesia at the 2018 Asian Para Games
