= Handball at the 2018 Asian Games – Men's tournament =

Handball competition

Men at the 2018 Asian Games
- Venue: POPKI Sports Hall
- Date: 13–31 August 2018
- Competitors: 204 from 13 nations

Medalists
gold medal	Qatar
silver medal	Bahrain
bronze medal	South Korea

The men's tournament of Handball at the 2018 Asian Games at Jakarta, Indonesia, was held from 13 to 31 August 2018 at the POPKI Sports Hall.

== Squads ==
Bahrain	Chinese Taipei	Hong Kong	India
Ali Merza; Hasan Al-Samahiji; Isa Khalaf; Mahmood Abdulqader; Mohamed Abdulredha; Mohamed Merza; Mohamed Abdulhusain; Bilal Basham; Hasan Madan; Husain Al-Baboor; Komail Mahfoodh; Jasim Al-Salatna; Ali Abdulqader; Hasan Al-Fardan; Mohamed Habib; Husain Al-Sayyad	Lin You-ting; Liu Tzu-fan; Huang Hsin-wei; Wang Ta-kang; Chiu Yi-fan; Wu Hsiu-min; Lin Kun-ming; Lai Hung-sheng; Chen Yen-tung; Hsu Chih-kun; Pan En-chieh; Huang Chen-kang; Hsu Hsien-ming; Hsiao Nien-cheng; Chao Hsien-chang; Huang Chia-hua	Addy Ip; Leung Laam Hei; Kenny Wong; Wong Shing Yip; Chan Ka Him; Tse Wing Fai; Eddy Ip; Ip Shi Yan; Cheung Wai Ho; Lau Kin Pan; Wong Chun Ho; Kuo Sze Ming; Dilyadav Singh; Lin Ming Fai; Yuen Hei Yin; Tony Lee	Atul Kumar; Deepak Ahlawat; Adithya Nagaraj; Harjinder Singh; Naveen Punia; Greenidge D'Cunha; Navdeep; Karamjeet Singh; Avin Khatkar; Ramesh Chand; Sachin Bhardwaj; Kamaljeet Singh; Rahul Dubey; Harender Singh; Davinder Singh; Bajrang Thakur
Indonesia	Iran	Iraq	Japan
Nur Rahman Effendi; Andi Yoga Ananda; Fitra Agung Aditya Pratama; Oni Arianus Sir; Yulianto Effendi Sir; Bagas; Rufan Pujianto; Viktorius Rafael Tolang; Alias Ilyas; Harun Nurrasyid; Saepul Rahman; Aryasatya Hidayat Noor; Phasa Nurfauzan; Rian Kurniawan; Dupa Gilang Pratama Wiguna; Risky Fidelano	Mojtaba Heidarpour; Milad Masaeli; Shahoo Nosrati; Alireza Mousavi; Mehdi Bijari; Mehdi Mousavi; Salaman Barbat; Mohsen Babasafari; Ehsan Abouei; Farzad Rostami; Ali Rahimi; Mehrdad Samsami; Jalal Kiani; Afshin Sadeghi; Mohammad Jomepour; Amin Kazemi	Bilal Hasan; Raed Abd-Zaid; Hussein Ali; Jasim Ghassab; Muntadher Qasim; Ahmed Makki; Mohanad Adil; Ali Abdul-Ridha; Majid Abdul-Ridha; Mohammed Sahib; Karrar Kadhim; Maytham Oudah; Mustafa Mohammed; Ali Adnan; Baderaldeen Hammoudi; Mohammed Ali	Naoki Sugioka; Hozuki Higashinagahama; Kenya Kasahara; Akihito Kai; Kohei Narita; Jin Watanabe; Motoki Sakai; Hiroki Shida; Hiroki Motoki; Hiroyasu Tamakawa; Kairi Kochi; Tatsuki Yoshino; Yuto Agarie; Naohiro Hamaguchi; Daichi Komuro; Tetsuya Kadoyama
Malaysia	Pakistan	Qatar	Saudi Arabia
Najhan Bohari; Izzat Abdul Karim; Dzulfiqar Ismail; Nabil Abdul Razak; Fazrin Jamaluddin; Ammar Safwan Nadzarudin; Koh Chan Seng; Faizan Damanhuri; Ridzuan Mohd Razali; Salman Sayyidi Hamzah; Uzair Zubli; Khairul Amirul Abdullah; Ahmad Zaidi Rosdi; Solihin Mustafa Kamal; Amirul Ikram Abdul Razak; Fikree Azman	Muhammad Nawaz; Hazrat Hussain; Naseem Ullah; Asim Saeed; Muhammad Shahid Pervaiz; Muhammad Zubair; Muhammad Uzair Atif; Nasir Hussain; Tahir Ali; Asif Hayat; Muzamal Hussain; Muhammad Shahid Bashir	Rasheed Yusuff; Bertrand Roiné; Rafael Capote; Frankis Carol; Abdulrazzaq Murad; Danijel Šarić; Goran Stojanović; Firas Chaieb; Amine Guehis; Allaedine Berrached; Wajdi Sinen; Ahmad Madadi; Youssef Benali; Moustafa Heiba; Anis Zouaoui; Ameen Zakkar	Mohammed Al-Nassfan; Abdullah Al-Abbas; Hassan Al-Janabi; Hisham Al-Obaidi; Abdulazez Saeed; Ahmed Al-Abdulali; Mohammed Al-Salem; Ali Al-Ibrahim; Mahdi Al-Salem; Muneer Abu Al-Rahi; Mohammed Al-Abbas; Abdullah Al-Hammad; Mojtaba Al-Salem; Mohammed Al-Zaer; Sadiq Al-Mohsin; Abbas Al-Saffar
South Korea			
Jeong Yi-kyeong; Sim Jae-bok; Choi Beom-mun; Jung Su-young; Park Jung-geu; Jo Tae-hun; Jang Dong-hyun; Lee Hyeon-sik; Yoon Ci-yoel; Na Seung-do; Hwang Do-yeop; Kim Dong-cheol; Jeong Jae-wan; Lee Dong-myung; Ku Chang-eun; Lee Chang-woo			

== Results ==
All times are Western Indonesia Time (UTC+07:00)

=== Preliminary round ===
==== Group A ====
Pos	Team	Pld	W	D	L	GF	GA	GD	Pts	Qualification
1	Qatar	2	2	0	0	99	31	+68	4	Main round / Group 1–2
2	Iran	2	1	0	1	75	46	+29	2	Main round / Group 1–2
3	Malaysia	2	0	0	2	22	119	−97	0	Main round / Group 3

Source: AHF

13 August; 16:00	Malaysia	11–64	Qatar	POPKI Sports Hall, Jakarta; Referees: Shakir, Kadhim (IRQ)
13 August; 16:00	Ismail, Kamal 3	(7–33)	Zouaoui 18	POPKI Sports Hall, Jakarta; Referees: Shakir, Kadhim (IRQ)
13 August; 16:00	2× (yellow card) 1× (suspension)			POPKI Sports Hall, Jakarta; Referees: Shakir, Kadhim (IRQ)

15 August; 11:00	Iran	55–11	Malaysia	POPKI Sports Hall, Jakarta; Referees: Li, Ke (CHN)
15 August; 11:00	Barbat 11	(29–5)	A. Abdul Razak 3	POPKI Sports Hall, Jakarta; Referees: Li, Ke (CHN)
15 August; 11:00	1× (yellow card) 1× (suspension)		1× (yellow card) 2× (suspension)	POPKI Sports Hall, Jakarta; Referees: Li, Ke (CHN)

17 August; 16:00	Qatar	35–20	Iran	POPKI Sports Hall, Jakarta; Referees: Lee, Koo (KOR)
17 August; 16:00	Heiba 6	(18–6)	Rostami, Kazemi 4	POPKI Sports Hall, Jakarta; Referees: Lee, Koo (KOR)
17 August; 16:00	3× (yellow card) 2× (suspension)		2× (yellow card) 5× (suspension) 1× (red card)	POPKI Sports Hall, Jakarta; Referees: Lee, Koo (KOR)

==== Group B ====
Pos	Team	Pld	W	D	L	GF	GA	GD	Pts	Qualification
1	South Korea	2	1	1	0	73	42	+31	3 (Note: Head-to-head result: KOR 26–26 JPN. Overall goal difference was used as the tiebreaker.)	Main round / Group 1–2
2	Japan	2	1	1	0	64	41	+23	3	Main round / Group 1–2
3	Pakistan	2	0	0	2	31	85	−54	0	Main round / Group 3

Source: AHF
Notes:

13 August; 18:00	Pakistan	16–47	South Korea	POPKI Sports Hall, Jakarta; Referees: Li, Ke (CHN)
13 August; 18:00	Saeed 6	(4–26)	Hwang 11	POPKI Sports Hall, Jakarta; Referees: Li, Ke (CHN)
13 August; 18:00	1× (yellow card) 3× (suspension)		1× (yellow card)	POPKI Sports Hall, Jakarta; Referees: Li, Ke (CHN)

15 August; 14:00	Japan	38–15	Pakistan	POPKI Sports Hall, Jakarta; Referees: Al-Wahibi, Al-Shahi (OMA)
15 August; 14:00	Shida 7	(20–7)	M. Hussain 5	POPKI Sports Hall, Jakarta; Referees: Al-Wahibi, Al-Shahi (OMA)
15 August; 14:00	3× (yellow card) 2× (suspension)		2× (yellow card) 1× (suspension)	POPKI Sports Hall, Jakarta; Referees: Al-Wahibi, Al-Shahi (OMA)

17 August; 9:00	South Korea	26–26	Japan	POPKI Sports Hall, Jakarta; Referees: Al-Marhoon, Al-Mawt (BHR)
17 August; 9:00	Kim 10	(13–13)	Motoki, Agarie 6	POPKI Sports Hall, Jakarta; Referees: Al-Marhoon, Al-Mawt (BHR)
17 August; 9:00	3× (yellow card) 5× (suspension)		3× (yellow card) 5× (suspension)	POPKI Sports Hall, Jakarta; Referees: Al-Marhoon, Al-Mawt (BHR)

==== Group C ====
Pos	Team	Pld	W	D	L	GF	GA	GD	Pts	Qualification
1	Saudi Arabia	2	2	0	0	89	37	+52	4	Main round / Group 1–2
2	Hong Kong	2	1	0	1	64	59	+5	2	Main round / Group 1–2
3	Indonesia	2	0	0	2	30	87	−57	0	Main round / Group 3

Source: AHF

13 August; 20:00	Hong Kong	40–17	Indonesia	POPKI Sports Hall, Jakarta; Referees: Tavakkoli, Valadkhanian (IRI)
13 August; 20:00	Chan 9	(19–6)	Tolang 5	POPKI Sports Hall, Jakarta; Referees: Tavakkoli, Valadkhanian (IRI)
13 August; 20:00	3× (yellow card) 2× (suspension)		2× (yellow card) 3× (suspension)	POPKI Sports Hall, Jakarta; Referees: Tavakkoli, Valadkhanian (IRI)

15 August; 16:00	Saudi Arabia	42–24	Hong Kong	POPKI Sports Hall, Jakarta; Referees: Lee, Koo (KOR)
15 August; 16:00	Saeed, Moj. Al-Salem 5	(21–12)	Ip S. 6	POPKI Sports Hall, Jakarta; Referees: Lee, Koo (KOR)
15 August; 16:00	3× (suspension)		2× (yellow card) 2× (suspension)	POPKI Sports Hall, Jakarta; Referees: Lee, Koo (KOR)

17 August; 14:00	Indonesia	13–47	Saudi Arabia	POPKI Sports Hall, Jakarta; Referees: Shakir, Kadhim (IRQ)
17 August; 14:00	Bagas, Tolang 5	(4–21)	Al-Saffar 8	POPKI Sports Hall, Jakarta; Referees: Shakir, Kadhim (IRQ)
17 August; 14:00	2× (yellow card)		2× (suspension)	POPKI Sports Hall, Jakarta; Referees: Shakir, Kadhim (IRQ)

==== Group D ====
Pos	Team	Pld	W	D	L	GF	GA	GD	Pts	Qualification
1	Bahrain	3	3	0	0	99	70	+29	6	Main round / Group 1–2
2	Iraq	3	2	0	1	101	89	+12	4	Main round / Group 1–2
3	Chinese Taipei	3	1	0	2	89	102	−13	2	Main round / Group 3
4	India	3	0	0	3	82	110	−28	0	Main round / Group 3

Source: AHF

13 August; 11:00	India	28–38	Chinese Taipei	POPKI Sports Hall, Jakarta; Referees: Al-Wahibi, Al-Shahi (OMA)
13 August; 11:00	Hare. Singh 8	(13–19)	Chiu 8	POPKI Sports Hall, Jakarta; Referees: Al-Wahibi, Al-Shahi (OMA)
13 August; 11:00	2× (yellow card) 3× (suspension)		1× (yellow card) 3× (suspension)	POPKI Sports Hall, Jakarta; Referees: Al-Wahibi, Al-Shahi (OMA)

13 August; 14:00	Iraq	24–30	Bahrain	POPKI Sports Hall, Jakarta; Referees: Hizaki, Ikebuchi (JPN)
13 August; 14:00	Hammoudi 5	(16–12)	Al-Samahiji, Al-Sayyad 5	POPKI Sports Hall, Jakarta; Referees: Hizaki, Ikebuchi (JPN)
13 August; 14:00	1× (yellow card) 3× (suspension)		1× (yellow card) 4× (suspension)	POPKI Sports Hall, Jakarta; Referees: Hizaki, Ikebuchi (JPN)

15 August; 18:00	Iraq	37–30	Chinese Taipei	POPKI Sports Hall, Jakarta; Referees: Al-Marhoon, Al-Mawt (BHR)
15 August; 18:00	Adnan 10	(17–14)	Chao 8	POPKI Sports Hall, Jakarta; Referees: Al-Marhoon, Al-Mawt (BHR)
15 August; 18:00	2× (yellow card) 6× (suspension)		1× (yellow card) 5× (suspension) 1× (red card)	POPKI Sports Hall, Jakarta; Referees: Al-Marhoon, Al-Mawt (BHR)

15 August; 20:00	India	25–32	Bahrain	POPKI Sports Hall, Jakarta; Referees: Al-Saqer, Al-Suqufi (KSA)
15 August; 20:00	Ahlawat 6	(11–18)	Habib 6	POPKI Sports Hall, Jakarta; Referees: Al-Saqer, Al-Suqufi (KSA)
15 August; 20:00	2× (yellow card) 4× (suspension)		3× (yellow card) 5× (suspension)	POPKI Sports Hall, Jakarta; Referees: Al-Saqer, Al-Suqufi (KSA)

17 August; 18:00	India	29–40	Iraq	POPKI Sports Hall, Jakarta; Referees: Al-Wahibi, Al-Shahi (OMA)
17 August; 18:00	Ahlawat 8	(13–18)	Adil 9	POPKI Sports Hall, Jakarta; Referees: Al-Wahibi, Al-Shahi (OMA)
17 August; 18:00	2× (yellow card) 5× (suspension)		3× (yellow card) 1× (suspension)	POPKI Sports Hall, Jakarta; Referees: Al-Wahibi, Al-Shahi (OMA)

17 August; 20:00	Bahrain	37–21	Chinese Taipei	POPKI Sports Hall, Jakarta; Referees: Tavakkoli, Valadkhanian (IRI)
17 August; 20:00	Al-Samahiji 6	(18–10)	Pan 8	POPKI Sports Hall, Jakarta; Referees: Tavakkoli, Valadkhanian (IRI)
17 August; 20:00	4× (yellow card) 3× (suspension)		4× (yellow card) 2× (suspension)	POPKI Sports Hall, Jakarta; Referees: Tavakkoli, Valadkhanian (IRI)

=== Main round ===
==== Group 1 ====
Pos	Team	Pld	W	D	L	GF	GA	GD	Pts	Qualification
1	Qatar	3	3	0	0	78	60	+18	6	Semifinals
2	Japan	3	1	1	1	70	74	−4	3	Semifinals
3	Saudi Arabia	3	0	2	1	69	74	−5	2	Classification 5th–6th
4	Iraq	3	0	1	2	64	73	−9	1	Classification 7th–8th

Source: AHF

20 August; 16:00	Iraq	20–26	Qatar	POPKI Sports Hall, Jakarta; Referees: Tavakkoli, Valadkhanian (IRI)
20 August; 16:00	Ghassab 5	(9–15)	Heiba, Zouaoui 5	POPKI Sports Hall, Jakarta; Referees: Tavakkoli, Valadkhanian (IRI)
20 August; 16:00	1× (yellow card) 2× (suspension)		2× (yellow card) 4× (suspension)	POPKI Sports Hall, Jakarta; Referees: Tavakkoli, Valadkhanian (IRI)

20 August; 20:00	Saudi Arabia	26–26	Japan	POPKI Sports Hall, Jakarta; Referees: Al-Marhoon, Al-Mawt (BHR)
20 August; 20:00	Al-Abbas 8	(15–11)	Agarie 7	POPKI Sports Hall, Jakarta; Referees: Al-Marhoon, Al-Mawt (BHR)
20 August; 20:00	3× (yellow card) 3× (suspension) 1× (red card)		3× (yellow card) 4× (suspension)	POPKI Sports Hall, Jakarta; Referees: Al-Marhoon, Al-Mawt (BHR)

22 August; 16:00	Japan	27–24	Iraq	POPKI Sports Hall, Jakarta; Referees: Tavakkoli, Valadkhanian (IRI)
22 August; 16:00	Motoki 9	(12–15)	Adnan 5	POPKI Sports Hall, Jakarta; Referees: Tavakkoli, Valadkhanian (IRI)
22 August; 16:00	1× (yellow card) 2× (suspension)		3× (yellow card) 8× (suspension) 1× (red card)	POPKI Sports Hall, Jakarta; Referees: Tavakkoli, Valadkhanian (IRI)

22 August; 20:00	Qatar	28–23	Saudi Arabia	POPKI Sports Hall, Jakarta; Referees: Lee, Koo (KOR)
22 August; 20:00	Capote 6	(16–10)	Al-Hammad 6	POPKI Sports Hall, Jakarta; Referees: Lee, Koo (KOR)
22 August; 20:00	3× (yellow card) 3× (suspension)		3× (yellow card) 4× (suspension) 1× (red card)	POPKI Sports Hall, Jakarta; Referees: Lee, Koo (KOR)

24 August; 16:00	Iraq	20–20	Saudi Arabia	POPKI Sports Hall, Jakarta; Referees: Tavakkoli, Valadkhanian (IRI)
24 August; 16:00	Adnan 9	(11–12)	Al-Abbas, Al-Abdulali 5	POPKI Sports Hall, Jakarta; Referees: Tavakkoli, Valadkhanian (IRI)
24 August; 16:00	1× (yellow card) 4× (suspension)		2× (yellow card) 3× (suspension) 2× (red card)	POPKI Sports Hall, Jakarta; Referees: Tavakkoli, Valadkhanian (IRI)

24 August; 20:00	Qatar	24–17	Japan	POPKI Sports Hall, Jakarta; Referees: Shakir, Kadhim (IRQ)
24 August; 20:00	Zouaoui 6	(13–10)	Higashinagahama 6	POPKI Sports Hall, Jakarta; Referees: Shakir, Kadhim (IRQ)
24 August; 20:00	1× (yellow card) 5× (suspension)		2× (yellow card) 4× (suspension)	POPKI Sports Hall, Jakarta; Referees: Shakir, Kadhim (IRQ)

==== Group 2 ====
Pos	Team	Pld	W	D	L	GF	GA	GD	Pts	Qualification
1	Bahrain	3	3	0	0	99	67	+32	6	Semifinals
2	South Korea	3	2	0	1	99	70	+29	4	Semifinals
3	Iran	3	1	0	2	97	83	+14	2	Classification 5th–6th
4	Hong Kong	3	0	0	3	54	129	−75	0	Classification 7th–8th

Source: AHF

20 August; 14:00	Bahrain	29–23	Iran	POPKI Sports Hall, Jakarta; Referees: Shakir, Kadhim (IRQ)
20 August; 14:00	A. Abdulqader 7	(16–13)	Sadeghi 8	POPKI Sports Hall, Jakarta; Referees: Shakir, Kadhim (IRQ)
20 August; 14:00	1× (yellow card) 4× (suspension) 2× (red card)		2× (yellow card) 6× (suspension)	POPKI Sports Hall, Jakarta; Referees: Shakir, Kadhim (IRQ)

20 August; 18:00	Hong Kong	15–40	South Korea	POPKI Sports Hall, Jakarta; Referees: Al-Saqer, Al-Suqufi (KSA)
20 August; 18:00	Tse 4	(7–21)	Jang, Hwang 7	POPKI Sports Hall, Jakarta; Referees: Al-Saqer, Al-Suqufi (KSA)
20 August; 18:00	3× (yellow card) 1× (suspension)		1× (yellow card)	POPKI Sports Hall, Jakarta; Referees: Al-Saqer, Al-Suqufi (KSA)

22 August; 14:00	South Korea	25–27	Bahrain	POPKI Sports Hall, Jakarta; Referees: Hizaki, Ikebuchi (JPN)
22 August; 14:00	Yoon 7	(11–13)	Al-Sayyad 8	POPKI Sports Hall, Jakarta; Referees: Hizaki, Ikebuchi (JPN)
22 August; 14:00	1× (yellow card) 6× (suspension) 1× (red card)		3× (yellow card) 6× (suspension)	POPKI Sports Hall, Jakarta; Referees: Hizaki, Ikebuchi (JPN)

22 August; 18:00	Iran	46–20	Hong Kong	POPKI Sports Hall, Jakarta; Referees: Al-Wahibi, Al-Shahi (OMA)
22 August; 18:00	Nosrati 12	(18–10)	Tse 7	POPKI Sports Hall, Jakarta; Referees: Al-Wahibi, Al-Shahi (OMA)
22 August; 18:00	1× (yellow card) 3× (suspension)		1× (yellow card) 3× (suspension)	POPKI Sports Hall, Jakarta; Referees: Al-Wahibi, Al-Shahi (OMA)

24 August; 14:00	Bahrain	43–19	Hong Kong	POPKI Sports Hall, Jakarta; Referees: Al-Saqer, Al-Suqufi (KSA)
24 August; 14:00	M. Abdulqader 14	(21–11)	Kuo 6	POPKI Sports Hall, Jakarta; Referees: Al-Saqer, Al-Suqufi (KSA)
24 August; 14:00	3× (yellow card)		1× (suspension)	POPKI Sports Hall, Jakarta; Referees: Al-Saqer, Al-Suqufi (KSA)

24 August; 18:00	Iran	28–34	South Korea	POPKI Sports Hall, Jakarta; Referees: Hizaki, Ikebuchi (JPN)
24 August; 18:00	Nosrati 10	(12–17)	Jeong Y. 9	POPKI Sports Hall, Jakarta; Referees: Hizaki, Ikebuchi (JPN)
24 August; 18:00	3× (yellow card) 2× (suspension)		2× (yellow card) 3× (suspension)	POPKI Sports Hall, Jakarta; Referees: Hizaki, Ikebuchi (JPN)

==== Group 3 ====
Pos	Team	Pld	W	D	L	GF	GA	GD	Pts
1	Chinese Taipei	4	4	0	0	142	95	+47	8
2	India	4	3	0	1	141	104	+37	6
3	Pakistan	4	2	0	2	134	111	+23	4
4	Indonesia	4	1	0	3	96	124	−28	2
5	Malaysia	4	0	0	4	78	157	−79	0

Source: AHF

20 August; 9:00	Chinese Taipei	36–32	Pakistan	POPKI Sports Hall, Jakarta; Referees: Hizaki, Ikebuchi (JPN)
20 August; 9:00	Chao 8	(16–14)	Pervaiz 8	POPKI Sports Hall, Jakarta; Referees: Hizaki, Ikebuchi (JPN)
20 August; 9:00	2× (yellow card) 1× (suspension)		4× (suspension)	POPKI Sports Hall, Jakarta; Referees: Hizaki, Ikebuchi (JPN)

20 August; 11:00	India	45–19	Malaysia	POPKI Sports Hall, Jakarta; Referees: Li, Ke (CHN)
20 August; 11:00	D. Singh 13	(25–8)	Abdul Karim, Jamaluddin 4	POPKI Sports Hall, Jakarta; Referees: Li, Ke (CHN)
20 August; 11:00	1× (yellow card) 2× (suspension)		4× (suspension)	POPKI Sports Hall, Jakarta; Referees: Li, Ke (CHN)

21 August; 9:00	Indonesia	23–28	Pakistan	POPKI Sports Hall, Jakarta; Referees: Al-Saqer, Al-Suqufi (KSA)
21 August; 9:00	Tolang 11	(10–12)	M. Hussain 8	POPKI Sports Hall, Jakarta; Referees: Al-Saqer, Al-Suqufi (KSA)
21 August; 9:00	1× (yellow card) 2× (suspension)		1× (yellow card) 2× (suspension)	POPKI Sports Hall, Jakarta; Referees: Al-Saqer, Al-Suqufi (KSA)

21 August; 11:00	Chinese Taipei	34–13	Malaysia	POPKI Sports Hall, Jakarta; Referees: Lee, Koo (KOR)
21 August; 11:00	Liu 9	(19–6)	Abdul Karim, Ismail 3	POPKI Sports Hall, Jakarta; Referees: Lee, Koo (KOR)
21 August; 11:00	2× (yellow card)		1× (yellow card) 3× (suspension)	POPKI Sports Hall, Jakarta; Referees: Lee, Koo (KOR)

24 August; 9:00	Indonesia	19–37	Chinese Taipei	POPKI Sports Hall, Jakarta; Referees: Al-Wahibi, Al-Shahi (OMA)
24 August; 9:00	Tolang 7	(7–18)	Chiu, Huang C.K., Hsiao 5	POPKI Sports Hall, Jakarta; Referees: Al-Wahibi, Al-Shahi (OMA)
24 August; 9:00	2× (yellow card) 5× (suspension)		2× (yellow card)	POPKI Sports Hall, Jakarta; Referees: Al-Wahibi, Al-Shahi (OMA)

24 August; 11:00	Pakistan	27–28	India	POPKI Sports Hall, Jakarta; Referees: Li, Ke (CHN)
24 August; 11:00	M. Hussain 7	(12–14)	D'Cunha 9	POPKI Sports Hall, Jakarta; Referees: Li, Ke (CHN)
24 August; 11:00	2× (yellow card) 3× (suspension)		3× (yellow card) 2× (suspension)	POPKI Sports Hall, Jakarta; Referees: Li, Ke (CHN)

26 August; 11:00	India	31–35	Chinese Taipei	POPKI Sports Hall, Jakarta; Referees: Ota, Shimajiri (JPN)
26 August; 11:00	D. Singh 10	(12–15)	Chiu 11	POPKI Sports Hall, Jakarta; Referees: Ota, Shimajiri (JPN)
26 August; 11:00	1× (yellow card) 3× (suspension)		2× (yellow card) 4× (suspension)	POPKI Sports Hall, Jakarta; Referees: Ota, Shimajiri (JPN)

26 August; 14:00	Indonesia	31–22	Malaysia	POPKI Sports Hall, Jakarta; Referees: Li, Ke (CHN)
26 August; 14:00	Bagas 10	(15–8)	Ismail 4	POPKI Sports Hall, Jakarta; Referees: Li, Ke (CHN)
26 August; 14:00	1× (yellow card) 1× (suspension)		1× (yellow card) 4× (suspension)	POPKI Sports Hall, Jakarta; Referees: Li, Ke (CHN)

29 August; 14:00	India	37–23	Indonesia	POPKI Sports Hall, Jakarta; Referees: Al-Suqufi, Al-Saqer (KSA)
29 August; 14:00	D. Singh 11	(16–13)	Tolang 9	POPKI Sports Hall, Jakarta; Referees: Al-Suqufi, Al-Saqer (KSA)
29 August; 14:00	3× (suspension)		2× (yellow card) 7× (suspension)	POPKI Sports Hall, Jakarta; Referees: Al-Suqufi, Al-Saqer (KSA)

29 August; 18:00	Malaysia	24–47	Pakistan	POPKI Sports Hall, Jakarta; Referees: Al-Marhoon, Al-Mawt (BHR)
29 August; 18:00	Jamaluddin 6	(9–21)	N. Hussain, M. Hussain 11	POPKI Sports Hall, Jakarta; Referees: Al-Marhoon, Al-Mawt (BHR)
29 August; 18:00	2× (yellow card) 3× (suspension)		1× (yellow card)	POPKI Sports Hall, Jakarta; Referees: Al-Marhoon, Al-Mawt (BHR)

=== Classification 5th–8th ===
==== Classification 7th–8th ====
26 August; 16:00	Iraq	31–24	Hong Kong	POPKI Sports Hall, Jakarta; Referees: Lee, Koo (KOR)
26 August; 16:00	M. Abdul-Ridha 7	(15–12)	Ip S. 5	POPKI Sports Hall, Jakarta; Referees: Lee, Koo (KOR)
26 August; 16:00	1× (yellow card) 3× (suspension)		2× (yellow card) 2× (suspension)	POPKI Sports Hall, Jakarta; Referees: Lee, Koo (KOR)

==== Classification 5th–6th ====
26 August; 18:00	Saudi Arabia	23–30	Iran	POPKI Sports Hall, Jakarta; Referees: Hizaki, Ikebuchi (JPN)
26 August; 18:00	Saeed, Moj. Al-Salem 5	(9–16)	Samsami 6	POPKI Sports Hall, Jakarta; Referees: Hizaki, Ikebuchi (JPN)
26 August; 18:00	1× (yellow card) 4× (suspension) 1×		3× (yellow card) 3× (suspension)	POPKI Sports Hall, Jakarta; Referees: Hizaki, Ikebuchi (JPN)

=== Final round ===
Semifinals
27 August
Qatar	27
South Korea	20
27 August
Bahrain	31
Japan	20

Gold medal match
31 August
Qatar (OT)	32
Bahrain	27
Bronze medal match
31 August
South Korea	24
Japan	23

==== Semifinals ====
27 August; 14:00	Qatar	27–20	South Korea	POPKI Sports Hall, Jakarta; Referees: Shakir, Kadhim (IRQ)
27 August; 14:00	Madadi 6	(13–7)	Lee H. 7	POPKI Sports Hall, Jakarta; Referees: Shakir, Kadhim (IRQ)
27 August; 14:00	4× (yellow card) 2× (suspension)		1× (yellow card) 3× (suspension)	POPKI Sports Hall, Jakarta; Referees: Shakir, Kadhim (IRQ)

27 August; 18:00	Bahrain	31–20	Japan	POPKI Sports Hall, Jakarta; Referees: Tavakkoli, Valadkhanian (IRI)
27 August; 18:00	Al-Sayyad 10	(15–9)	Watanabe 7	POPKI Sports Hall, Jakarta; Referees: Tavakkoli, Valadkhanian (IRI)
27 August; 18:00	2× (yellow card) 4× (suspension)		2× (yellow card) 1× (suspension)	POPKI Sports Hall, Jakarta; Referees: Tavakkoli, Valadkhanian (IRI)

==== Bronze medal match ====
31 August; 16:00	South Korea	24–23	Japan	POPKI Sports Hall, Jakarta; Referees: Al-Marhoon, Al-Mawt (BHR)
31 August; 16:00	Hwang 6	(13–12)	Watanabe, Agarie 5	POPKI Sports Hall, Jakarta; Referees: Al-Marhoon, Al-Mawt (BHR)
31 August; 16:00	3× (yellow card)		3× (yellow card) 2× (suspension)	POPKI Sports Hall, Jakarta; Referees: Al-Marhoon, Al-Mawt (BHR)

==== Gold medal match ====
31 August
18:00
Qatar
32–27 (ET)
Bahrain
POPKI Sports Hall, Jakarta
Referees: Hizaki, Ikebuchi (JPN)
Zouaoui 7
(13–14)
Al-Sayyad 5
3× (yellow card) 3× (suspension)

4× (yellow card) 5× (suspension)

FT: 25–25 ET: 7–2

== Final standing ==
Rank	Team	Pld	W	D	L
1st place, gold medalist(s)	Qatar	7	7	0	0
2nd place, silver medalist(s)	Bahrain	8	7	0	1
3rd place, bronze medalist(s)	South Korea	7	4	1	2
4	Japan	7	2	2	3
5	Iran	6	3	0	3
6	Saudi Arabia	6	2	2	2
7	Iraq	7	3	1	3
8	Hong Kong	6	1	0	5
9	Chinese Taipei	7	5	0	2
10	India	7	3	0	4
11	Pakistan	6	2	0	4
12	Indonesia	6	1	0	5
13	Malaysia	6	0	0	6
