= Saudi Arabia at the 2018 Asian Games =

- IOC code: KSA
- NOC: Saudi Arabian Olympic Committee
- Website: www.olympic.sa

in Jakarta and Palembang August 18 – September 2
- Flag bearer: Ali Yousef Alothman
- Medals Ranked 25th: Gold 1 Silver 2 Bronze 3 Total 6

Asian Games appearances (overview)
- 1978; 1982; 1986; 1990; 1994; 1998; 2002; 2006; 2010; 2014; 2018; 2022; 2026

Saudi Arabia competed at the 2018 Asian Games in Jakarta and Palembang, Indonesia, from 18 August to 2 September 2018.

== Medalists ==
The following Saudi Arabia competitors won medals at the Games.

| Medal | Name | Sport | Event | Date |
|---|---|---|---|---|
| Gold | Ramzy Al-Duhami; Khaled Al-Mobty; Khaled Al-Eid; Abdullah Al-Sharbatly | Equestrian | Team jumping | 28 Aug |
| Silver | Hussain Ghuwayli Al-Harbi | Shooting | Men's 300 metre standard rifle | 24 Aug |
| Silver | Raef Adel Al-Turkistani | Karate | Men's kumite 75 kg | 27 Aug |
| Bronze | Tareg Hamedi | Karate | Men's kumite +84 kg | 25 Aug |
| Bronze | Ramzy Al-Duhami | Equestrian | Individual jumping | 30 Aug |
| Bronze | Tariq Ahmed Al-Amri | Athletics | Men's 5000 metres | 30 Aug |

Medals by sport
| Sport | 1st place, gold medalist(s) | 2nd place, silver medalist(s) | 3rd place, bronze medalist(s) | Total |
| Athletics | 0 | 0 | 1 | 1 |
| Equestrian | 1 | 0 | 1 | 2 |
| Karate | 0 | 1 | 1 | 2 |
| Shooting | 0 | 1 | 0 | 1 |
| Total | 1 | 2 | 3 | 6 |

Medals by day
| Day | Date | 1st place, gold medalist(s) | 2nd place, silver medalist(s) | 3rd place, bronze medalist(s) | Total |
| 1 | August 19 | 0 | 0 | 0 | 0 |
| 2 | August 20 | 0 | 0 | 0 | 0 |
| 3 | August 21 | 0 | 0 | 0 | 0 |
| 4 | August 22 | 0 | 0 | 0 | 0 |
| 5 | August 23 | 0 | 0 | 0 | 0 |
| 6 | August 24 | 0 | 1 | 0 | 1 |
| 7 | August 25 | 0 | 0 | 1 | 1 |
| 8 | August 26 | 0 | 0 | 0 | 0 |
| 9 | August 27 | 0 | 1 | 0 | 1 |
| 10 | August 28 | 1 | 0 | 0 | 1 |
| 11 | August 29 | 0 | 0 | 0 | 0 |
| 12 | August 30 | 0 | 0 | 2 | 2 |
| 13 | August 31 | 0 | 0 | 0 | 0 |
| 14 | September 1 | 0 | 0 | 0 | 0 |
| 15 | September 2 | 0 | 0 | 0 | 0 |
| Total | | 1 | 2 | 3 | 6 |

== Competitors ==
The following is a list of the number of competitors representing Saudi Arabia that participated at the Games:

| Sport | Men | Women | Total |
|---|---|---|---|
| Archery | 3 | 0 | 3 |
| Athletics | 11 | 3 | 14 |
| Badminton | 0 | 2 | 2 |
| Bowling | 6 | 0 | 6 |
| Contract bridge | 4 | 0 | 4 |
| Equestrian | 4 | 0 | 4 |
| Football | 20 | 0 | 20 |
| Gymnastics | 2 | 0 | 2 |
| Handball | 16 | 0 | 16 |
| Jet ski | 3 | 0 | 3 |
| Ju-jitsu | 2 | 1 | 3 |
| Judo | 1 | 0 | 1 |
| Karate | 4 | 0 | 4 |
| Paragliding | 5 | 0 | 5 |
| Rowing | 1 | 0 | 1 |
| Shooting | 6 | 0 | 6 |
| Swimming | 1 | 0 | 1 |
| Taekwondo | 7 | 1 | 8 |
| Volleyball | 12 | 0 | 12 |
| Water polo | 13 | 0 | 13 |
| Weightlifting | 7 | 0 | 7 |
| Total | 128 | 7 | 135 |

Demonstration events

| Sport | Men | Women | Total |
|---|---|---|---|
| eSports | 7 | 0 | 7 |

== Archery ==
Recurve

| Athlete | Event | Ranking round | | Round of 64 | Round of 32 | Round of 16 | Quarterfinals | Semifinals | Final / BM | |
| Athlete | Event | Score | Seed | Opposition score | Opposition score | Opposition score | Opposition score | Opposition score | Opposition score | Rank |
|---|---|---|---|---|---|---|---|---|---|---|
| Abdalelah Ali Binali | Men's individual | 613 | 62 | did not advance | | | | | | |
| Fahd Alwi Mansour | Men's individual | 621 | 35 | Thamwong (THA); L 5–6 | did not advance | | | | | |
| Fares Mater Alotaibi | Men's individual | 620 | 36 | Najafabadi (IRI); W 6–0 | Abdullin (KAZ); L 0–6 | did not advance | | | | |
| Abdalelah Binali; Fahd Alwi Mansour; Fares Mater Alotaibi | Men's team | 1854 | 16 | Hong Kong; W 5–1 | South Korea; L 0–6 | did not advance | | | | |

== Athletics ==
Saudi Arabia entered fourteen athletes (ahmed saud 11 men's and 3 women's) to participate in the athletics competition at the Games.

== Badminton ==
Women

| Athlete | Event | Round of 32 | Round of 16 | Quarterfinals | Semifinals | Final | |
| Athlete | Event | Opposition score | Opposition score | Opposition score | Opposition score | Opposition score | Rank |
|---|---|---|---|---|---|---|---|
| Rana Abu Harbesh | Singles | Cheung N Y (HKG); L 2–21, 5–21 | did not advance | | | | |
| Shatha Almutairi | Singles | K Sirimannage (SRI); L 4–21, 4–21 | did not advance | | | | |
| Rana Abu Harbesh; Shatha Almutairi | Doubles | Bye | Lee S-h / Shin S-c (KOR); L 4–21, 7–21 | did not advance | | | |

== Bowling ==
Men

| Athlete | Event | Block 1 | Block 2 | Total | Rank |
| Athlete | Event | Result | Result | Total | Rank |
|---|---|---|---|---|---|
| Adel Al-Bariqi; Sultan Al-Masri; Ammar Tarrad | Trios | 2000 | 1851 | 3851 | 23 |
| Yousef Akbar; Abdulrahman Al-Kheliwi; Hassan Al-Shaikh | Trios | 1971 | 2000 | 3971 | 17 |
| Yousef Akbar; Abdulrahman Al-Kheliwi; Hassan Al-Shaikh; Adel Al-Bariqi; Sultan Al-Masri; Ammar Tarrad | Team of six | 4017 | 3908 | 7925 | 10 |

== Contract bridge ==
Men

| Athlete | Event | Qualification | | Semifinal | | Final | |
| Athlete | Event | Point | Rank | Point | Rank | Point | Rank |
|---|---|---|---|---|---|---|---|
| Omar Bajunaid; Abdelhakim Sahab | Pair | 1404.1 | 24 Q | 1015.4 | 15 | did not advance | |
| Ibrahim Al-Ahdal; Hussamuddin Sallout | Pair | 1218.4 | 33 | did not advance | | | |
| Abdelhakim Sahab; Ibrahim Al-Ahdal; Omar Bajunaid; Hussamuddin Sallout | Team | 56.29 | 14 | did not advance | | | |

== Equestrian ==
Saudi Arabia clinched its first gold medal when the equestrian team came first in the jumping event represented by Ramzy Al-Duhami, Khaled Al-Mobty, Khaled Al-Eid, and Abdullah Al-Sharbatly. The team outsmarted equestrian contestants from 17 countries.

Jumping

| Athlete | Horse | Event | Qualification | | Qualifier 1 | | | Qualifier 2 Team Final | | | Final round A | | | Final round B | | |
| Athlete | Horse | Event | Points | Rank | Penalties | Total | Rank | Penalties | Total | Rank | Penalties | Total | Rank | Penalties | Total | Rank |
|---|---|---|---|---|---|---|---|---|---|---|---|---|---|---|---|---|
| Ramzy Al-Duhami | TED | Individual | 0.00 | 1 | 0 | 0.00 | 1 Q | 1 | 1.00 | 1 Q | 0 | 1.00 | 1 Q | 4 | 5.00 | 3rd place, bronze medalist(s) |
| Khaled Al-Eid | Kayenne of de Rocky Mounten | Individual | 1.50 | 5 | 4 | 5.50 | 11 Q | 0 | 5.50 | 8 Q | 8 | 13.50 | 11 | did not advance | | |
| Khaled Al-Mobty | Dessert Storm II | Individual | 0.40 | 2 | 0 | 0.40 | 2 Q | 4 | 4.40 | 7 Q | 5 | 9.40 | 8 Q | 6 | 15.40 | 8 |
| Abdullah Al-Sharbatly | Carrera | Individual | 4.19 # | 14 | Eliminated | | | did not advance | | | | | | | | |
| Abdullah Al-Sharbatly; Khaled Al-Eid; Khaled Al-Mobty; Ramzy Al-Duhami | See above | Team | 1.90 | 1 | 4 | 5.90 | 1 Q | 5 | 10.90 | 1st place, gold medalist(s) | —N/a | | | | | |

# – indicates that the score of this rider does not count in the team competition, since only the best three results of a team are counted.

== Esports (demonstration) ==
Clash Royale

| Athlete | ID | Event | Round 1 | Round 2 | Round 3 | Loser round 1 | Loser round 2 | Loser round 3 | Semifinal | Final | |
| Athlete | ID | Event | Opposition score | Opposition score | Opposition score | Opposition score | Opposition score | Opposition score | Opposition score | Opposition score | Rank |
|---|---|---|---|---|---|---|---|---|---|---|---|
| Solaiman Almbrek | Scorep10 | Clash Royale | India; L 0–3 | did not advance | | Uzbekistan; W 3–0 | India; L 0–3 | did not advance | | | |

Hearthstone

| Athlete | ID | Event | Quarterfinals | Semifinals | Final / BM | |
| Athlete | ID | Event | Opposition score | Opposition score | Opposition score | Rank |
|---|---|---|---|---|---|---|
| Mosa Fouad H Alkaltham | Abu11ibrahim | Hearthstone | Vietnam; L 1–3 | did not advance | | |

League of Legends

| Athlete | ID | Event | Group stage | | Semifinals | Final / BM | |
| Athlete | ID | Event | Oppositions scores | Rank | Opposition score | Opposition score | Rank |
|---|---|---|---|---|---|---|---|
| Hamza Wazzan; Ajwad Wazzan; Maan Arshad; Nawaf Alsalem; Meshal Albarrak | Wickychi; Ajwad; Fear; Mimic; Mishal | League of Legends | Chinese Taipei: L 0–2; Pakistan: W 2–0; Indonesia: W 2–0 | 2 Q | South Korea; L 0–2 | Chinese Taipei; L 1–3 | 4 |

== Football ==
Saudi Arabia drawn in group F at the Games.

Summary

| Team | Event | Group Stage | | | | Round of 16 | Quarterfinal | Semifinal | Final / BM | |
| Team | Event | Opposition Score | Opposition Score | Opposition Score | Rank | Opposition Score | Opposition Score | Opposition Score | Opposition Score | Rank |
|---|---|---|---|---|---|---|---|---|---|---|
| Saudi Arabia men's | Men's tournament | Iran; D 0–0 | Myanmar; W 3–0 | North Korea; L 0–3 | 3 Q | China; W 4–3 | Japan; L 1–2 | did not advance | | 8 |

=== Men's tournament ===
Roster

The following is the Saudi Arabia squad in the men's football tournament of the 2018 Asian Games.

Head coach: (Saudi Arabia) Saad Al-Shehri

| No. | Pos. | Player | Date of birth (age) | Caps | Goals | Club |
|---|---|---|---|---|---|---|
| 1 | GK | Amin Al Bukhari | 2 May 1997 (aged 21) | | | (Saudi Arabian Football Federation) Al-Ittihad |
| 21 | GK | Saleh Al Ohaymid | 21 May 1998 (aged 20) | | | (Saudi Arabian Football Federation) Al-Nassr |
| 22 | GK | Mohammed Al Rubaie | 14 August 1997 (aged 20) | | | (Saudi Arabian Football Federation) Al-Batin |
| 2 | DF | Abdullah Hassoun | 19 March 1997 (aged 21) | | | (Saudi Arabian Football Federation) Al-Ahli |
| 3 | DF | Mohammed Bassas | 31 August 1998 (aged 19) | | | (Saudi Arabian Football Federation) Al-Ahli |
| 4 | DF | Abdullah Al-Yousef | 29 October 1997 (aged 20) | | | (Saudi Arabian Football Federation) Al-Fateh |
| 5 | DF | Abdulelah Al-Amri | 15 January 1997 (aged 21) | | | (Saudi Arabian Football Federation) Al-Wehda |
| 12 | DF | Mohammed Al-Zubaidi | 25 August 1997 (aged 20) | | | (Saudi Arabian Football Federation) Al-Ahli |
| 13 | DF | Awn Al-Saluli (captain) | 2 September 1998 (aged 19) | | | (Saudi Arabian Football Federation) Al-Ittihad |
| 6 | MF | Yousef Al-Harbi | 16 March 1997 (aged 21) | | | (Saudi Arabian Football Federation) Al-Ahli |
| 7 | MF | Abdulrahman Ghareeb | 31 March 1997 (aged 21) | | | (Saudi Arabian Football Federation) Al-Ahli |
| 8 | MF | Abdullah Majrashi | 24 August 1997 (aged 20) | | | (Saudi Arabian Football Federation) Al-Ahli |
| 10 | MF | Ayman Al-Khulaif | 22 May 1997 (aged 21) | | | (Saudi Arabian Football Federation) Al-Ahli |
| 11 | MF | Saad Al-Selouli | 25 May 1998 (aged 20) | | | (Saudi Arabian Football Federation) Al-Ettifaq |
| 14 | MF | Ali Al-Asmari | 12 January 1997 (aged 21) | | | (Saudi Arabian Football Federation) Ohod |
| 16 | MF | Abdurahman Al-Dossari | 25 September 1997 (aged 20) | | | (Saudi Arabian Football Federation) Al-Nassr |
| 17 | MF | Nasser Al Omran | 13 July 1997 (aged 21) | | | (Saudi Arabian Football Federation) Al-Shabab |
| 18 | MF | Nawaf Al Habashi | 23 June 1998 (aged 20) | | | (Saudi Arabian Football Federation) Al-Shabab |
| 9 | FW | Haroune Camara | 1 January 1998 (aged 20) | | | (Saudi Arabian Football Federation) Al-Qadsiah |
| 20 | FW | Muteb Al-Hammad | 13 August 1998 (aged 19) | | | (Saudi Arabian Football Federation) Al-Batin |

* Over-aged player.

Group F

| Pos | Team | Pld | W | D | L | GF | GA | GD | Pts | Qualification |
|---|---|---|---|---|---|---|---|---|---|---|
| 1 | Iran | 3 | 1 | 1 | 1 | 3 | 2 | +1 | 4 | Advance to knockout stage |
| 2 | North Korea | 3 | 1 | 1 | 1 | 4 | 4 | 0 | 4 | Advance to knockout stage |
| 3 | Saudi Arabia | 3 | 1 | 1 | 1 | 3 | 3 | 0 | 4 | Advance to knockout stage |
| 4 | Myanmar | 3 | 1 | 1 | 1 | 3 | 4 | −1 | 4 | |

Source: Asian Games 2018
Rules for classification: Group stage tiebreakers
15 August 2018
16:00 UTC+7

| Saudi Arabia | 0–0 | Iran |
|---|---|---|
| | Report |

Wibawa Mukti Stadium, Cikarang
Referee: Jansen Foo (Singapore)

17 August 2018
19:00 UTC+7

| Myanmar | 0–3 | Saudi Arabia |
|---|---|---|
| | Report | Gharib 15' (pen.), 59' (pen.); Al-Banaqi 89' |

Wibawa Mukti Stadium, Cikarang
Referee: Çarymyrat Kurbanow (Turkmenistan)

20 August 2018
16:00 UTC+7

| North Korea | 3–0 | Saudi Arabia |
|---|---|---|
| Kim Yong-il 2'; Kim Yu-song 25', 51' | Report |

Wibawa Mukti Stadium, Cikarang
Referee: Nasrullo Kabirov (Tajikistan)

Round of 16

24 August 2018
16:00 UTC+7

| China | 3–4 | Saudi Arabia |
|---|---|---|
| Yao Junsheng 80'; Huang Zichang 88'; Wei Shihao 90+5' | Report | Camara 16', 33', 60'; Al-Selouli 29' |

Patriot Candrabhaga Stadium, Bekasi
Referee: Kim Dae-yong (South Korea)

Quarter-finals

27 August 2018
16:00 UTC+7

| Saudi Arabia | 1–2 | Japan |
|---|---|---|
| Tatsuta 39' (o.g.) | Report | Iwasaki 31', 73' |

Pakansari Stadium, Cibinong
Referee: Timur Faizullin (Kyrgyzstan)

== Handball ==
Saudi Arabia men's team will compete in group C at the Games.

Summary

| Team | Event | Preliminary | Standing | Main / Class. | Rank / standing | Semifinals / Pl. | Final / BM / Pl. | |
| Team | Event | Opposition score | Standing | Opposition score | Rank / standing | Opposition score | Opposition score | Rank |
|---|---|---|---|---|---|---|---|---|
| Saudi Arabia men's | Men's tournament | Group C Hong Kong: W 42–24; Indonesia: W 47–13 | 1 Q | Group I Japan: D 26–26; Qatar: L 23–28; Iraq: D 20–20 | 3 | Did not advance | Iran; L 23–30 | 6 |

=== Men's tournament ===
Roster

- Mohammed Al-Nassfan
- Abdullah Al-Abbas
- Hassan Al-Janabi (C)
- Hisham Al-Obaidi
- Abdulazez Saeed
- Ahmed Al-Abdulali
- Mohammed Al-Salem
- Ali Al-Ibrahim
- Mahdi Al-Salem
- Muneer Abu Alrahi
- Mohammed Al-Abbas
- Abdullah Al-Hammad
- Mojtaba Al-Salem
- Mohammed Al-Zaer
- Sadiq Al-Mohsin
- Abbas Al-Saffar

Group C

| Pos | Team | Pld | W | D | L | GF | GA | GD | Pts | Qualification |
|---|---|---|---|---|---|---|---|---|---|---|
| 1 | Saudi Arabia | 2 | 2 | 0 | 0 | 89 | 37 | +52 | 4 | Main round / Group 1–2 |
| 2 | Hong Kong | 2 | 1 | 0 | 1 | 64 | 59 | +5 | 2 | Main round / Group 1–2 |
| 3 | Indonesia | 2 | 0 | 0 | 2 | 30 | 87 | −57 | 0 | Main round / Group 3 |

Source: AHF

| 15 August; 16:00 | Saudi Arabia | 42–24 | Hong Kong | POPKI Sports Hall, Jakarta; Referees: Lee, Koo (KOR) |
| 15 August; 16:00 | Saeed, Moj. Al-Salem 5 | (21–12) | Ip S. 6 | POPKI Sports Hall, Jakarta; Referees: Lee, Koo (KOR) |
| 15 August; 16:00 | 3× (suspension) | | 2× (yellow card) 2× (suspension) | POPKI Sports Hall, Jakarta; Referees: Lee, Koo (KOR) |

| 17 August; 14:00 | Indonesia | 13–47 | Saudi Arabia | POPKI Sports Hall, Jakarta; Referees: Shakir, Kadhim (IRQ) |
| 17 August; 14:00 | Bagas, Tolang 5 | (4–21) | Al-Saffar 8 | POPKI Sports Hall, Jakarta; Referees: Shakir, Kadhim (IRQ) |
| 17 August; 14:00 | 2× (yellow card) | | 2× (suspension) | POPKI Sports Hall, Jakarta; Referees: Shakir, Kadhim (IRQ) |

Main round (Group I)

| Pos | Team | Pld | W | D | L | GF | GA | GD | Pts | Qualification |
|---|---|---|---|---|---|---|---|---|---|---|
| 1 | Qatar | 3 | 3 | 0 | 0 | 78 | 60 | +18 | 6 | Semifinals |
| 2 | Japan | 3 | 1 | 1 | 1 | 70 | 74 | −4 | 3 | Semifinals |
| 3 | Saudi Arabia | 3 | 0 | 2 | 1 | 69 | 74 | −5 | 2 | Classification 5th–6th |
| 4 | Iraq | 3 | 0 | 1 | 2 | 64 | 73 | −9 | 1 | Classification 7th–8th |

Source: AHF

| 20 August; 20:00 | Saudi Arabia | 26–26 | Japan | POPKI Sports Hall, Jakarta; Referees: Al-Marhoon, Al-Mawt (BHR) |
| 20 August; 20:00 | Al-Abbas 8 | (15–11) | Agarie 7 | POPKI Sports Hall, Jakarta; Referees: Al-Marhoon, Al-Mawt (BHR) |
| 20 August; 20:00 | 3× (yellow card) 3× (suspension) 1× (red card) | | 3× (yellow card) 4× (suspension) | POPKI Sports Hall, Jakarta; Referees: Al-Marhoon, Al-Mawt (BHR) |

| 22 August; 20:00 | Qatar | 28–23 | Saudi Arabia | POPKI Sports Hall, Jakarta; Referees: Lee, Koo (KOR) |
| 22 August; 20:00 | Capote 6 | (16–10) | Al-Hammad 6 | POPKI Sports Hall, Jakarta; Referees: Lee, Koo (KOR) |
| 22 August; 20:00 | 3× (yellow card) 3× (suspension) | | 3× (yellow card) 4× (suspension) 1× (red card) | POPKI Sports Hall, Jakarta; Referees: Lee, Koo (KOR) |

| 24 August; 16:00 | Iraq | 20–20 | Saudi Arabia | POPKI Sports Hall, Jakarta; Referees: Tavakkoli, Valadkhanian (IRI) |
| 24 August; 16:00 | Adnan 9 | (11–12) | Al-Abbas, Al-Abdulali 5 | POPKI Sports Hall, Jakarta; Referees: Tavakkoli, Valadkhanian (IRI) |
| 24 August; 16:00 | 1× (yellow card) 4× (suspension) | | 2× (yellow card) 3× (suspension) 2× (red card) | POPKI Sports Hall, Jakarta; Referees: Tavakkoli, Valadkhanian (IRI) |

Fifth place game

| 26 August; 18:00 | Saudi Arabia | 23–30 | Iran | POPKI Sports Hall, Jakarta; Referees: Hizaki, Ikebuchi (JPN) |
| 26 August; 18:00 | Saeed, Moj. Al-Salem 5 | (9–16) | Samsami 6 | POPKI Sports Hall, Jakarta; Referees: Hizaki, Ikebuchi (JPN) |
| 26 August; 18:00 | 1× (yellow card) 4× (suspension) 1× | | 3× (yellow card) 3× (suspension) | POPKI Sports Hall, Jakarta; Referees: Hizaki, Ikebuchi (JPN) |

== Jet ski ==
| Athlete | Event | Moto Points | | | | Ded. | Total | Rank |
| Athlete | Event | 1 | 2 | 3 | 4 | Ded. | Total | Rank |
|---|---|---|---|---|---|---|---|---|
| Hesham Bakhsh | Runabout limited | 27 | 33 | DNF | | —N/a | 60 | 10 |
| Saud Ahmad | Runabout 1100 stock | DNF | | | | —N/a | 0 | – |
| Saud Ahmad | Runabout endurance open | 348 | 344 | 352 | —N/a | –5 | 1039 | 7 |
| Khalid Al-Otaibi | Runabout endurance open | 328 | DNF | | —N/a | –5 | 323 | 13 |

== Ju-jitsu ==
Saudi Arabia entered the ju-jitsu competition with 3 athletes (2 men's and 1 women's).

Key:

- ADV – Won by advantages.
- RDC – Won by referee decision.
- SUB – Won by submission.

Men

| Athlete | Event | Round of 32 | Round of 16 | Quarterfinals | Semifinals | Repechage | Final / BM | Rank |
| Athlete | Event | Opposition Result | Opposition Result | Opposition Result | Opposition Result | Opposition Result | Opposition Result | Rank |
|---|---|---|---|---|---|---|---|---|
| Abdulmalik Al-Murdhi | –69 kg | M Wakili (AFG); W 100^{SUB}–0 | T Al-Kirbi (UAE); L 0–0^{ADV} | did not advance | | | | |
| Ahmed Saud | –85 kg | J Andishmand (AFG); W 2^{RDC}–2 | K Balhol (UAE); L 0–100^{SUB} | did not advance | | | | |

Women

| Athlete | Event | Round of 32 | Round of 16 | Quarterfinals | Semifinals | Repechage | Final / BM | Rank |
| Athlete | Event | Opposition Result | Opposition Result | Opposition Result | Opposition Result | Opposition Result | Opposition Result | Rank |
|---|---|---|---|---|---|---|---|---|
| Farah Al-Zahrani | –62 kg | Bye | B Al-Matrooshi (UAE); DSQ | did not advance | | | | |

== Judo ==
Saudi Arabia sent one judoka to compete at the Games.

Key:

- 1st number — Ippon
- 2nd number — Waza-ari
- s — Shido

Men

| Athlete | Event | Round of 32 | Round of 16 | Quarterfinals | Semifinals | Repechage | Final / BM | Rank |
| Athlete | Event | Opposition Result | Opposition Result | Opposition Result | Opposition Result | Opposition Result | Opposition Result | Rank |
|---|---|---|---|---|---|---|---|---|
| Sulaiman Hamad | –73 kg | S Dangol (NEP); W 10s1–00 | V Scvortov (UAE); L 00–11 | did not advance | | | | |

== Paragliding ==
Men

| Athlete | Event | Round | | | | | | | | | | Total | Rank |
| Athlete | Event | 1 | 2 | 3 | 4 | 5 | 6 | 7 | 8 | 9 | 10 | Total | Rank |
|---|---|---|---|---|---|---|---|---|---|---|---|---|---|
| Abdulmotaaly Ahmed | Individual accuracy | 7 | 175 | 35 | 352 | 13 | 51 | ~~500~~ | 17 | 73 | 81 | 804 | 15 |
| Ali Al-Nujaimi | Individual accuracy | 5 | 22 | 34 | ~~500~~ | 87 | 500 | 7 | 132 | 154 | 88 | 1029 | 21 |
| Abdulmotaaly Ahmed; Aali Al-Maymuni; Ali Al-Nujaimi; Ali Al-Shamrani; Ibrahim Bahri | Team accuracy | 728 | 784 | 115 | 874 | 279 | 1189 | —N/a | | | | 3969 | 7 |

== Rowing ==
Men

| Athlete | Event | Heats | | Repechage | | Final | |
| Athlete | Event | Time | Rank | Time | Rank | Time | Rank |
|---|---|---|---|---|---|---|---|
| Husein Alireza | Single sculls | 8:58.16 | 5 R | 8:18.83 | 4 FB | 7:59.18 | 9 |

== Shooting ==
Hussain Ghuwayli Al-Harbi claimed the first medal for the Saudi Arabia contingent by winning the silver in the 300 metre standard rifle men's competition.

Men

| Athlete | Event | Qualification | | Final | |
| Athlete | Event | Points | Rank | Points | Rank |
|---|---|---|---|---|---|
| Atallah Al-Anazi | 10 m air pistol | 573 | 17 | did not advance | |
| Safar Al-Dosari | 10 m air pistol | 560 | 32 | did not advance | |
| Mesfer Al-Ammari | 10 m air rifle | 617.3 | 21 | did not advance | |
| Hussain Al-Harbi | 10 m air rifle | 616.8 | 24 | did not advance | |
| Hussain Al-Harbi | 300 m standard rifle | —N/a | | 568 | 2nd place, silver medalist(s) |
| Abdulrahman Al-Juhaydili | 300 m standard rifle | —N/a | | 557 | 9 |
| Saeed Al-Mutairi | Skeet | 122 | 4 Q | 31 | 4 |

== Swimming ==
Men

| Athlete | Event | Heats | | Final | |
| Athlete | Event | Time | Rank | Time | Rank |
|---|---|---|---|---|---|
| Yousif Habib Bu Arish | 50 m freestyle | 24.39 | 33 | did not advance | |
| Yousif Habib Bu Arish | 50 m butterfly | 25.74 | 30 | did not advance | |
| Yousif Habib Bu Arish | 100 m butterfly | 57.84 | 27 | did not advance | |

== Taekwondo ==
Poomsae

| Athlete | Event | Round of 16 | Quarterfinal | Semifinal | Final | |
| Athlete | Event | Opposition Score | Opposition Score | Opposition Score | Opposition Score | Rank |
|---|---|---|---|---|---|---|
| Wahid Moghis | Men's individual | Hu Mingda (CHN); L 7.86–8.34 | did not advance | | | |
| Wahid Moghis; Essa Al-Shaikh; Mohammed Al-Mustafa | Men's team | Philippines; L 7.64–8.18 | did not advance | | | |

Kyorugi

| Athlete | Event | Round of 32 | Round of 16 | Quarterfinal | Semifinal | Final | |
| Athlete | Event | Opposition Score | Opposition Score | Opposition Score | Opposition Score | Opposition Score | Rank |
|---|---|---|---|---|---|---|---|
| Ali Asiri | Men's −58 kg | Bye | | | | | |
| Hamad Al-Mabrouk | Men's −63 kg | Tawin Hanprab (THA) | | | | | |
| Ghazi Al-Asmari | Men's −68 kg | Sonexay Mangkheua (LAO) | | | | | |
| Saud Al-Muwallad | Men's −80 kg | Nurlan Myrzabayev (KAZ) | | | | | |
| Norah Al-Marri | Women's −57 kg | Bye | Permata Cinta Nadya (INA) | | | | |

== Volleyball ==
Saudi Arabia men's team has placed in pool A at the Games.

=== Indoor volleyball ===
| Team | Event | Group Stage | | Playoffs | Quarterfinals / Pl. | Semifinals / Pl. | Final / BM / Pl. | |
| Team | Event | Oppositions scores | Rank | Opposition score | Opposition score | Opposition score | Opposition score | Rank |
|---|---|---|---|---|---|---|---|---|
| Saudi Arabia men's | Men's tournament | Kyrgyzstan: W 3–1; Indonesia: W 3–1 | 1 Q | Bye | Chinese Taipei; L 1–3 | Thailand; L 0–3 | China; L 0–3 | 10 |

==== Men's tournament ====
Roster

The following is the Saudi Arabia roster in the men's volleyball tournament of the 2018 Asian Games.

Head coach: (North Macedonia) Zharko Ristoski

| No. | Name | Date of birth | Height | Weight | Spike | Block | Club |
|---|---|---|---|---|---|---|---|
| 1 | Ibrahim Salman Al-Moaiqel | 7 April 1996 | 1.93 m (6 ft 4 in) | 70 kg (150 lb) | 343 cm (135 in) | 302 cm (119 in) | (Saudi Arabia) Al-Hilal |
| 2 | Nawaf Al-Bakheet | 31 August 1987 | 1.92 m (6 ft 4 in) | 73 kg (161 lb) | 335 cm (132 in) | 318 cm (125 in) | |
| 3 | Ahmed Al-Bakheet (c) | 30 September 1982 | 1.98 m (6 ft 6 in) | 82 kg (181 lb) | 331 cm (130 in) | 321 cm (126 in) | (Qatar) Al Arabi |
| 4 | Hassan Abdullah Wathlan | 10 May 1995 | 1.93 m (6 ft 4 in) | 68 kg (150 lb) | 345 cm (136 in) | 304 cm (120 in) | (Saudi Arabia) Al-Hilal |
| 5 | Meshari Saad Al-Gurashi | 24 April 1997 | 1.93 m (6 ft 4 in) | 69 kg (152 lb) | 343 cm (135 in) | 303 cm (119 in) | |
| 6 | Sami Mohammed Samiti | 15 February 1993 | 1.93 m (6 ft 4 in) | 70 kg (150 lb) | 344 cm (135 in) | 305 cm (120 in) | |
| 8 | Hassan Al-Abdulbaqi | 20 June 1996 | 1.88 m (6 ft 2 in) | 76 kg (168 lb) | 338 cm (133 in) | 310 cm (120 in) | |
| 10 | Bandar Ali Al-Zahrani | 14 May 1990 | 1.84 m (6 ft 0 in) | 80 kg (180 lb) | 335 cm (132 in) | 308 cm (121 in) | |
| 11 | Abdullah Hassan Al-Zahrani | 18 June 1995 | 1.75 m (5 ft 9 in) | 66 kg (146 lb) | | | (Saudi Arabia) Al-Hilal |
| 12 | Muwaffaq Al-Mutairi | 30 September 1990 | 1.89 m (6 ft 2 in) | 70 kg (150 lb) | 335 cm (132 in) | 320 cm (130 in) | (Saudi Arabia) Al-Hilal |
| 13 | Omar Mansour Al-Najrani | 13 July 1990 | 1.86 m (6 ft 1 in) | 71 kg (157 lb) | 334 cm (131 in) | 323 cm (127 in) | (Saudi Arabia) Al Ahly |
| 17 | Ibrahim Ali Majrashi | 7 January 1998 | 1.97 m (6 ft 6 in) | 71 kg (157 lb) | 348 cm (137 in) | 330 cm (130 in) | (Saudi Arabia) Al Ahly |

Pool A

| Pos | Team | Pld | W | L | Pts | SW | SL | SR | SPW | SPL | SPR | Qualification |
|---|---|---|---|---|---|---|---|---|---|---|---|---|
| 1 | Saudi Arabia | 2 | 2 | 0 | 6 | 6 | 2 | 3.000 | 186 | 167 | 1.114 | Classification for 1–12 |
| 2 | Indonesia | 2 | 1 | 1 | 3 | 4 | 3 | 1.333 | 164 | 149 | 1.101 | Classification for 1–12 |
| 3 | Kyrgyzstan | 2 | 0 | 2 | 0 | 1 | 6 | 0.167 | 136 | 170 | 0.800 | Classification for 13–20 |

Source: OCA

| Date | Time | | Score | | Set 1 | Set 2 | Set 3 | Set 4 | Set 5 | Total | Report |
|---|---|---|---|---|---|---|---|---|---|---|---|
| 20 Aug | 10:00 | Saudi Arabia | 3–1 | Kyrgyzstan | 25–18 | 20–25 | 25–18 | 25–17 | | 95–78 | Report |
| 22 Aug | 19:00 | Indonesia | 1–3 | Saudi Arabia | 23–25 | 25–16 | 19–25 | 22–25 | | 89–91 | Report |
| 26 Aug | 19:00 | Saudi Arabia | 1–3 | Chinese Taipei | 25–22 | 19–25 | 8–25 | 23–25 | | 75–97 | Report |
| 30 Aug | 10:00 | Saudi Arabia | 0–3 | Thailand | 23–25 | 25–27 | 22–25 | | | 70–77 | Report |
| 31 Aug | 14:30 | Saudi Arabia | 0–3 | China | 15–25 | 10–25 | 17–25 | | | 42–75 | Report |

== Water polo ==
Summary

Key:

- FT – After full time.
- P – Match decided by penalty-shootout.

| Team | Event | Group Stage | | | | | Quarterfinal | Semifinal / Pl. | Final / BM / Pl. | |
| Team | Event | Opposition score | Opposition score | Opposition score | Opposition score | Rank | Opposition score | Opposition score | Opposition score | Rank |
|---|---|---|---|---|---|---|---|---|---|---|
| Saudi Arabia men's | Men's tournament | Indonesia; D 12–12 | Hong Kong; W 12–6 | China; L 5–17 | Japan; L 4–20 | 3 Q | Iran; L 7–15 | Singapore; L 5–6 | Indonesia; W 12–8 | 7 |

=== Men's tournament ===
Team roster

Head coach: Bandar Al-Zahrani

1. Hussain Jaizany (GK)
2. Mohammed Al-Helal (CB)
3. Mohammed Gahal (D)
4. Saeed Taleb (CB)
5. Naif Al-Muntashiri (D)
6. Ayman Al-Aryani (CB)
7. Ahmed Al-Shammary (D)
8. Khaled Al-Harbi (CF) (C)
9. Hamed Al-Nefaiei (CF)
10. Bader Al-Dughther (D)
11. Adel Al-Malki (D)
12. Mohammed Al-Khawfi (D)
13. Omar Sharahili (GK)

Group B

| Pos | Team | Pld | W | D | L | GF | GA | GD | Pts | Qualification |
|---|---|---|---|---|---|---|---|---|---|---|
| 1 | Japan | 4 | 4 | 0 | 0 | 79 | 15 | +64 | 8 | Quarterfinals |
| 2 | China | 4 | 3 | 0 | 1 | 63 | 22 | +41 | 6 | Quarterfinals |
| 3 | Saudi Arabia | 4 | 1 | 1 | 2 | 33 | 55 | −22 | 3 (Note: Head-to-head result: KSA 12–12 INA. Goal difference against the highest placed team (JPN): KSA −16, INA −17.) | Quarterfinals |
| 4 | Indonesia | 4 | 1 | 1 | 2 | 32 | 63 | −31 | 3 | Quarterfinals |
| 5 | Hong Kong | 4 | 0 | 0 | 4 | 17 | 69 | −52 | 0 | |

Source: OCA
Notes:

| 25 August; 15:00 | Saudi Arabia | 12–12 | Indonesia | Gelora Bung Karno Aquatic Stadium, Jakarta; Referees: Safabakhsh (IRI), Flahive (AUS) |
| 25 August; 15:00 | Score by quarters: 1–3, 4–4, 3–4, 4–1 | | | Gelora Bung Karno Aquatic Stadium, Jakarta; Referees: Safabakhsh (IRI), Flahive (AUS) |
| 25 August; 15:00 | Al-Dughather 6 | Goals | Harahap 4 | Gelora Bung Karno Aquatic Stadium, Jakarta; Referees: Safabakhsh (IRI), Flahive (AUS) |

| 26 August; 15:50 | Saudi Arabia | 12–6 | Hong Kong | Gelora Bung Karno Aquatic Stadium, Jakarta; Referees: Han (KOR), Salnichenko (KAZ) |
| 26 August; 15:50 | Score by quarters: 2–1, 4–1, 4–2, 2–2 | | | Gelora Bung Karno Aquatic Stadium, Jakarta; Referees: Han (KOR), Salnichenko (KAZ) |
| 26 August; 15:50 | Al-Nefaiei 3 | Goals | Cheng H.M. 3 | Gelora Bung Karno Aquatic Stadium, Jakarta; Referees: Han (KOR), Salnichenko (KAZ) |

| 28 August; 15:50 | China | 17–5 | Saudi Arabia | Gelora Bung Karno Aquatic Stadium, Jakarta; Referees: Safabakhsh (IRI), Salnichenko (KAZ) |
| 28 August; 15:50 | Score by quarters: 4–0, 2–1, 6–1, 5–3 | | | Gelora Bung Karno Aquatic Stadium, Jakarta; Referees: Safabakhsh (IRI), Salnichenko (KAZ) |
| 28 August; 15:50 | Liu, Sha, Zhang 3 | Goals | Al-Dughather, Al-Malki 2 | Gelora Bung Karno Aquatic Stadium, Jakarta; Referees: Safabakhsh (IRI), Salnichenko (KAZ) |

| 29 August; 15:50 | Japan | 20–4 | Saudi Arabia | Gelora Bung Karno Aquatic Stadium, Jakarta; Referees: Ni (CHN), Jiathornwattana (THA) |
| 29 August; 15:50 | Score by quarters: 4–1, 5–1, 6–0, 5–2 | | | Gelora Bung Karno Aquatic Stadium, Jakarta; Referees: Ni (CHN), Jiathornwattana (THA) |
| 29 August; 15:50 | Adachi 5 | Goals | Al-Dughather 2 | Gelora Bung Karno Aquatic Stadium, Jakarta; Referees: Ni (CHN), Jiathornwattana (THA) |

Quarter-final

| 30 August; 9:00 | Iran | 15–7 | Saudi Arabia | Gelora Bung Karno Aquatic Stadium, Jakarta; Referees: Alexandrescu (ROU), Štampalija (CRO) |
| 30 August; 9:00 | Score by quarters: 2–1, 4–1, 5–3, 4–2 | | | Gelora Bung Karno Aquatic Stadium, Jakarta; Referees: Alexandrescu (ROU), Štampalija (CRO) |
| 30 August; 9:00 | Malek-Khanbanan 4 | Goals | Al-Dughather 3 | Gelora Bung Karno Aquatic Stadium, Jakarta; Referees: Alexandrescu (ROU), Štampalija (CRO) |

Classification semifinal (5–8)

| 31 August; 9:00 | Saudi Arabia | 5–6 | Singapore | Gelora Bung Karno Aquatic Stadium, Jakarta; Referees: Ni (CHN), Safabakhsh (IRI) |
| 31 August; 9:00 | Score by quarters: 3–1, 0–1, 2–0, 0–4 | | | Gelora Bung Karno Aquatic Stadium, Jakarta; Referees: Ni (CHN), Safabakhsh (IRI) |
| 31 August; 9:00 | Taleb, Al-Dughather 2 | Goals | Koh 2 | Gelora Bung Karno Aquatic Stadium, Jakarta; Referees: Ni (CHN), Safabakhsh (IRI) |

Seventh place game

| 1 September; 9:00 | Saudi Arabia | 12–8 | Indonesia | Gelora Bung Karno Aquatic Stadium, Jakarta; Referees: Han (KOR), Tahara (JPN) |
| 1 September; 9:00 | Score by quarters: 3–0, 2–3, 0–2, 7–3 | | | Gelora Bung Karno Aquatic Stadium, Jakarta; Referees: Han (KOR), Tahara (JPN) |
| 1 September; 9:00 | Al-Malki 4 | Goals | Budiman, Arifin 2 | Gelora Bung Karno Aquatic Stadium, Jakarta; Referees: Han (KOR), Tahara (JPN) |

== Weightlifting ==
Men

| Athlete | Event | Snatch | | Clean & Jerk | | Total | Rank |
| Athlete | Event | Result | Rank | Result | Rank | Total | Rank |
|---|---|---|---|---|---|---|---|
| Mansour Al-Saleem | −56 kg | 122 | 4 | 142 | 6 | 264 | 6 |
| Seraj Al-Saleem | −56 kg | 108 | 8 | 141 | 7 | 249 | 8 |
| Nawaf Mohammed S Almazaydi | −62 kg | ~~115~~ | DNF | — | — | — | — |
| Mahmoud Mohammed Al Humayd | −69 kg | 142 | 7 | 177 | 8 | 319 | 6 |
| Mohsen Hussain Al Duhaylib | −69 kg | 131 | 13 | 166 | 11 | 297 | 12 |
| Ali Yousef Alothman | −85 kg | 130 | 9 | 161 | 9 | 291 | 9 |
| Ali Ahmed Al Khazal | −94 kg | 150 | 8 | 190 | 5 | 340 | 7 |
