= Qatar at the 2018 Asian Games =

- IOC code: QAT
- NOC: Qatar Olympic Committee
- Website: www.olympic.qa

in Jakarta and Palembang August 18 – September 2
- Competitors: 201
- Flag bearer: Abdulla Al-Tamimi
- Medals Ranked 15th: Gold 6 Silver 4 Bronze 3 Total 13

Asian Games appearances (overview)
- 1978; 1982; 1986; 1990; 1994; 1998; 2002; 2006; 2010; 2014; 2018; 2022; 2026

Qatar competed at the 2018 Asian Games in Jakarta and Palembang, Indonesia, from 18 August to 2 September 2018. Qatar represented by 20 national sport federations, with a plan of over 250 competitors who will be participating across 30 disciplines and also at the 2018 Asian Para Games.

== Medalists ==
The following Qatar competitors won medals at the Games.

Medal	Name	Sport	Event	Date
Gold	Abdalelah Hassan	Athletics	Men's 400 metres	26 Aug
Gold	Ashraf El-Seify	Athletics	Men's hammer throw	26 Aug
Gold	Abderrahman Samba	Athletics	Men's 400 metres hurdles	27 Aug
Gold	Ahmed Tijan Janko; Cherif Younousse	Volleyball	Men's beach volleyball	28 Aug
Gold	Abderrahman Samba; Mohamed Nasir Abbas; Mohamed El Nour; Abdalelah Haroun	Athletics	Men's 4 × 400 metres relay	30 Aug
Gold	Qatar men's national handball team	Handball	Men's Handball	31 Aug
Silver	Faris Ibrahim	Weightlifting	Men's 94 kg	25 Aug
Silver	Tosin Ogunode	Athletics	Men's 100 metres	26 Aug
Silver	Yaser Bagharab	Athletics	Men's 3000 metres steeplechase	27 Aug
Silver	Sheikh Ali Al-Thani	Equestrian	Individual jumping	30 Aug
Bronze	Hamad Ali Al-Marri	Shooting	Men's double trap	23 Aug
Bronze	Sheikh Ali Al-Thani; Bassem Hassan Mohammed; Hamad Al-Attiyah; Salmen Al-Suwaidi	Equestrian	Team jumping	28 Aug
Bronze	Abubaker Haydar Abdalla	Athletics	Men's 800 metres	28 Aug

Medals by sport
Sport	1st place, gold medalist(s)	2nd place, silver medalist(s)	3rd place, bronze medalist(s)	Total
Athletics	4	2	1	7
Equestrian	0	1	1	2
Handball	1	0	0	1
Shooting	0	0	1	1
Volleyball	1	0	0	1
Weightlifting	0	1	0	1
Total	6	4	3	13

Medals by day
Day	Date	1st place, gold medalist(s)	2nd place, silver medalist(s)	3rd place, bronze medalist(s)	Total
1	August 19	0	0	0	0
2	August 20	0	0	0	0
3	August 21	0	0	0	0
4	August 22	0	0	0	0
5	August 23	0	0	1	1
6	August 24	0	0	0	0
7	August 25	0	1	0	1
8	August 26	2	1	0	3
9	August 27	1	1	0	2
10	August 28	1	0	2	3
11	August 29	0	0	0	0
12	August 30	1	1	0	2
13	August 31	1	0	0	1
14	September 1	0	0	0	0
15	September 2	0	0	0	0
Total		6	4	3	13

== Competitors ==
The following is a list of the number of competitors representing Qatar that participated at the Games:

Sport	Men	Women	Total
Archery	6	1	7
Athletics	24	2	26
Basketball	16	4	20
Bowling	6	0	6
Boxing	3	0	3
Diving	2	0	2
Equestrian	7	0	7
Fencing	8	2	10
Football	20	0	20
Golf	4	0	4
Gymnastics	2	2	4
Handball	16	0	16
Judo	2	0	2
Karate	3	0	3
Paragliding	2	0	2
Rowing	0	1	1
Sailing	2	0	2
Shooting	12	8	20
Squash	4	0	4
Swimming	8	0	8
Table tennis	2	5	7
Taekwondo	2	1	3
Tennis	2	0	2
Triathlon	1	0	1
Volleyball	18	0	18
Weightlifting	1	0	1
Wrestling	2	0	2
Total	175	26	201

== Archery ==
Recurve

Athlete	Event	Ranking round		Round of 64	Round of 32	Round of 16	Quarterfinals	Semifinals	Final / BM	
Athlete	Event	Score	Seed	Opposition score	Opposition score	Opposition score	Opposition score	Opposition score	Opposition score	Rank
Abdulaziz Alobadi	Men's individual	576	76	did not advance						
Ali Ahmed Salem	Men's individual	579	44	Ashrafi (IRI); W 6–4	Mohamad (MAS); L 0–6	did not advance				
Ibrahim Al-Mohanadi	Men's individual	623	32	Ma (HKG); L 0–6	did not advance					
Abdulaziz Alobadi; Ali Ahmed Salem; Ibrahim Al-Mohanadi	Men's team	1778	19	Nepal; L 0–6	did not advance					
Maria Ahmed	Women's individual	DNS		did not advance						

Compound

Athlete	Event	Ranking round		Round of 32	Round of 16	Quarterfinals	Semifinals	Final / BM	
Athlete	Event	Score	Seed	Opposition score	Opposition score	Opposition score	Opposition score	Opposition score	Rank
Ahmed Abdulla Alabadi; Farhan Abdorraboh; Israf Khan	Men's team	1977	15	—N/a	India; L 213–227	did not advance			

== Athletics ==
Qatar entered twenty six athletes (24 men's and 2 women's) to participate in the athletics competition at the Games.

== Basketball ==
Summary

Team	Event	Group Stage						Quarterfinal	Semifinals / Pl.	Final / BM / Pl.	
Team	Event	Opposition score	Opposition score	Opposition score	Opposition score	Opposition score	Rank	Opposition score	Opposition score	Opposition score	Rank
Qatar men's	Men's tournament	—N/a		Hong Kong; W 90−80	Japan; L 71−82	Chinese Taipei; L 70−83	3	did not advance			9
Qatar men's	Men's 3x3 tournament	Maldives; W Disq.	Nepal; W 21−8	Syria; W 17−7	Jordan; W 21−7	Japan; L 15−21	2 Q	China; L 18−21	did not advance		
Qatar women's	Women's 3x3 tournament	—N/a		China; L 3−22	Vietnam; L 6−12	Malaysia; L 7−18	4	did not advance			

=== 5x5 basketball ===
Qatar men's team entered the competition and drawn in the group C.

==== Men's tournament ====
Roster

The following is the Qatar roster in the men's basketball tournament of the 2018 Asian Games.

Qatar men's national basketball team - 2018 Asian Games roster
Players
Coaches

Pos.	No.	Name	Age – Date of birth	Height	Club	Ctr.
G/F	1	Mohamed Hassan	27 – 3 August 1991	1.91 m (6 ft 3 in)	Al Rayan	(Qatar)
PG	3	Mohamed Abdelaziz	22 – 23 November 1995	1.78 m (5 ft 10 in)	Al Rayan	(Qatar)
G	5	Moustafa Lashin	21 – 10 August 1997	1.70 m (5 ft 7 in)	Al-Khor	(Qatar)
F	8	Tanguy Ngombo (NP)	29 – 18 July 1989	1.97 m (6 ft 6 in)	Al Rayan	(Qatar)
C	10	Mohammed Yousuf (C)	35 – 9 September 1982	2.06 m (6 ft 9 in)	El Jaish	(Qatar)
SG	11	Abdurahim Abuissa	18 – 31 May 2000	1.75 m (5 ft 9 in)	Al Sadd	(Qatar)
G/F	22	Khalid Suliman	31 – 7 February 1987	1.96 m (6 ft 5 in)	Al-Arabi	(Qatar)
G	25	Khaled Abdelbaset	21 – 10 June 1997	1.70 m (5 ft 7 in)	Al-Arabi	(Qatar)
PF	33	Emir Mujkić	20 – 8 November 1997	2.10 m (6 ft 11 in)	Al-Wakrah	(Qatar)
F/C	42	Nasser Al-Rayes	23 – 6 September 1994	2.08 m (6 ft 10 in)	Al Sadd	(Qatar)
F	44	Faris Avdic	21 – 27 January 1997	2.01 m (6 ft 7 in)	Al-Shamal	(Qatar)
F	96	Abdelrahman Abdelhaleem	22 – 26 June 1996	1.79 m (5 ft 10 in)	Al Rayan	(Qatar)

Head coach

- (United Kingdom) Tim Lewis

Assistant coach(es)

- (Qatar) Hashim Zaidan

Legend

- (C) Team captain
- (NP) Naturalized player
- Club - describes last
  club before the tournament
- Age - describes age
  on 14 August 2018

Group C

Pos	Team	Pld	W	L	PF	PA	PD	Pts	Qualification
1	Chinese Taipei	3	3	0	252	202	+50	6	Quarterfinals
2	Japan	3	2	1	235	224	+11	5	Quarterfinals
3	Qatar	3	1	2	231	245	−14	4	
4	Hong Kong	3	0	3	229	276	−47	3	

Source: OCA

14 August
16:00

Hong Kong	80–90	Qatar
Scoring by quarter: 16–27, 16–24, 16–22, 32–17
Pts: Lau 21; Rebs: Szeto 13; Asts: Szeto 7		Pts: Suliman 19; Rebs: Yousuf 10; Asts: Suliman 7

Gelora Bung Karno Basketball Hall, Jakarta
Referees: Kim Jong-kuk (KOR), Haryanto Sutaryo (INA), Imran Ali Baig (IND)

16 August
18:30

Japan	82–71	Qatar
Scoring by quarter: 17–23, 22–14, 22–18, 21–16
Pts: Hashimoto 22; Rebs: Schafer 7 Asts: Hashimoto 4		Pts: Ngombo 36; Rebs: Yousuf, Suliman 6 Asts: Suliman 6

Gelora Bung Karno Basketball Hall, Jakarta
Referees: Ferdinand Pascual (PHI), Yevgeniy Mikheyev (KAZ), Kim Jong-kuk (KOR)

25 August
16:00

Qatar	70–83	Chinese Taipei
Scoring by quarter: 13–24, 22–15, 17–13, 18–31
Pts: Suliman, Al-Rayes 13; Rebs: Al-Rayes 9 Asts: Avdić 5		Pts: Chen Y. 20; Rebs: Chou P., Chen K. 8 Asts: Chen Y. 5

Gelora Bung Karno Basketball Hall, Jakarta
Referees: Harja Jaladri (INA), Yevgeniy Mikheyev (KAZ), Preeda Muongmee (THA)

=== 3x3 basketball ===
Qatar also set a men's and women's team that competed in the 3-on-3 basketball. The men's team placed in pool C and the women's team in pool A based on the FIBA 3x3 federation ranking.

==== Men's tournament ====
Roster

The following is the Qatar roster in the men's 3x3 basketball tournament of the 2018 Asian Games.

- Babacar Dieng
- Moustafa Fouda
- Nedim Muslic
- Seydou Ndoye

Pool C

Pos	Team	Pld	W	L	PF	PA	PD	Qualification
1	Japan	5	5	0	86	46	+40	Quarterfinals
2	Qatar	5	4	1	74	43	+31	Quarterfinals
3	Syria	5	3	2	62	76	−14	
4	Nepal	5	2	3	59	74	−15	
5	Jordan	5	1	4	43	85	−42	
—	Maldives	5	0	5	0	0	0	

Source: OCA

21 August
17:30

Qatar	vs.	Maldives
Forfeit

Gelora Bung Karno Tennis Center Court, Jakarta

21 August
18:40

Nepal	8–21	Qatar
Pts: Maharjan 4		Pts: Dieng, Muslić 8

Gelora Bung Karno Tennis Center Court, Jakarta
Referees: Quinn (INA), Shi (CHN)

21 August
19:40

Qatar	17–7	Syria
Pts: Dieng 6		Pts: Idelbi 3

Gelora Bung Karno Tennis Center Court, Jakarta
Referees: Quinn (INA), Ibragimow (TKM)

24 August
15:00

Qatar	21–7	Jordan
Pts: Dieng 9		Pts: Juha 3

Gelora Bung Karno Tennis Center Court, Jakarta
Referees: Ho (HKG), Quinn (INA)

24 August
16:00

Japan	21–15	Qatar
Pts: Matsuwaki 10		Pts: Muslić 8

Gelora Bung Karno Tennis Center Court, Jakarta
Referees: Ho (HKG), Shi (CHN)

Quarter-final

26 August
14:00

China	21–18	Qatar
Pts: Huang 8		Pts: Muslić 7

Gelora Bung Karno Tennis Center Court, Jakarta
Referees: Ito (JPN), Rulyov (KAZ)

==== Women's tournament ====
Roster

The following is the Qatar roster in the women's 3x3 basketball tournament of the 2018 Asian Games.

- Sara Al-Saadi
- Yasmin Koshkosh
- Mona Saad
- Alaa Soliman

Pool A

Pos	Team	Pld	W	L	PF	PA	PD	Qualification
1	China	3	3	0	66	26	+40	Quarterfinals
2	Malaysia	3	2	1	45	41	+4	Quarterfinals
3	Vietnam	3	1	2	33	41	−8	
4	Qatar	3	0	3	16	52	−36	

Source: OCA

21 August
16:50

China	22–3	Qatar
Pts: Li, Jiang 8		Pts: Koshkosh 2

Gelora Bung Karno Tennis Center Court, Jakarta
Referees: Al-Harthi (OMA), Ito (JPN)

24 August
18:40

Qatar	6–12	Vietnam
Pts: Soliman 4		Pts: Trần 7

Gelora Bung Karno Tennis Center Court, Jakarta
Referees: Al-Harthi (OMA), Tan (SGP)

24 August
20:00

Qatar	7–18	Malaysia
Pts: Soliman 4		Pts: Ho 9

Gelora Bung Karno Tennis Center Court, Jakarta
Referees: Al-Harthi (OMA), Ibragimow (TKM)

== Bowling ==
Men

Athlete	Event	Block 1	Block 2	Total	Rank
Athlete	Event	Result	Result	Total	Rank
Ali Al-Janahi; Ahmed Al-Deyab; Yousef Al-Jaber	Trios	2033	2002	4035	14
Jassim Al-Merikhi; Mohammed Al-Merikhi; Ghanim Abou-Jassoum	Trios	1948	1906	3854	22
Ali Al-Janahi; Ahmed Al-Deyab; Yousef Al-Jaber; Jassim Al-Merikhi; Mohammed Al-Merikhi; Ghanim Abou-Jassoum	Team of six	4097	3860	7957	9

== Boxing ==
Men

Athlete	Event	Round of 32	Round of 16	Quarterfinals	Semifinals	Final	Rank
Athlete	Event	Opposition Result	Opposition Result	Opposition Result	Opposition Result	Opposition Result	Rank
Abdullatef Sadiq	–60 kg	R Juntrong (THA); WO	did not advance				
Hakan Erseker	–64 kg	N Kobashev (KGZ); L 0–5	did not advance				
Thulasimaaran Tharumalingam	–69 kg	Bye	BPG Gurung (NEP); W 5–0	Z Eashash (JOR); L 0–5	did not advance		

== Diving ==
Qatar entered two men's diver at the Games, but one diver (Mohammed Shewaiter) did not participate in any diving events.

Men

Athlete	Event	Preliminaries		Final	
Athlete	Event	Points	Rank	Points	Rank
Abdulaziz Balghaith	1 m springboard	218.35	11 Q	231.05	11
Abdulaziz Balghaith	3 m springboard	248.70	14	did not advance	

== Equestrian ==
Qatar was named seven riders at the Games. Three riders participated in the eventing event, while four riders in the jumping event.

Eventing

Athlete	Horse	Event	Dressage		Cross-country			Jumping		
Athlete	Horse	Event	Penalties	Rank	Penalties	Total	Rank	Penalties	Total	Rank
Ali Al-Marri	Fernhill Friendly Touch	Individual	32.00	14	13.20	45.20	16 Q	0.00	45.20	14
Hassan Al-Naimi	Santa Cruz III	Individual	32.90	17	Eliminated			did not advance		
Saeed Al-Rashdi	Graffiti de Lully CH	Individual	35.30	27	31.60	66.90	20 Q	12.00	78.90	19
Ali Al-Marri; Hassan Al-Naimi; Saeed Al-Rashdi	See above	Team	100.20	7		1112.10	8		1124.10	7

Jumping

Athlete	Horse	Event	Qualification		Qualifier 1			Qualifier 2 Team Final			Final round A			Final round B		
Athlete	Horse	Event	Points	Rank	Penalties	Total	Rank	Penalties	Total	Rank	Penalties	Total	Rank	Penalties	Total	Rank
Hamad Al-Attiyah	Clinton	Individual	4.64	16	4	8.64	18 Q	4	12.64	20 Q	Retired			did not advance		
Salmen Al-Suwaidi	Cantaro 32	Individual	5.89 #	25	13 #	18.89	40 Q	11 #	29.89	40	did not advance					
Sheikh Ali Al-Thani	Sirocco	Individual	1.02	3	0	1.02	3 Q	0	1.02	2 Q	1	2.02	3 Q	0	2.02	2nd place, silver medalist(s)
Bassem Hassan Mohammed	Argelith Squid	Individual	2.84	8	4	6.84	13 Q	0	6.84	9 Q	Eliminated			did not advance		
Hamad Al-Attiyah; Salmen Al-Suwaidi; Sheikh Ali Al-Thani; Bassem Hassan Mohammed	See above	Team	8.50	2	8	16.50	3 Q	4	20.50	3rd place, bronze medalist(s)	—N/a					

# – indicates that the score of this rider does not count in the team competition, since only the best three results of a team are counted.

== Fencing ==
Qatar competed in the fencing competition at the Games, but their fencer ended their challenge at the group stage.

Individual

Athlete	Event	Preliminary		Round of 32	Round of 16	Quarterfinals	Semifinals	Final	
Athlete	Event	Opposition score	Rank	Opposition score	Opposition score	Opposition score	Opposition score	Opposition score	Rank
Mohammed Al-Shamari	Men's épée	NA Bhatti (PAK): W 5–1; F Alimov (UZB): L 1–5; MR Mohamed (MAS): W 5–2; A Al-Shatti (KUW): DNS; Jung J-s (KOR): W 5–4; Lan MH (CHN): L 1–5	3 Q	Nguyễn TN (VIE); L 7–15	did not advance				19
Mohammed Mirzaei	Men's épée	R Pratama (INA): L 3–5; R Kurbanov (KAZ): L 2–5; K Minobe (JPN): L 1–5; K Baudunov (KGZ): L 4–5; Ho WH (HKG): L 0–5	6	did not advance					30
Ahmed Alquradaghi	Men's foil	N Choi (HKG): L 0–5; Ou F-m (TPE): L 3–5; Hoi MK (MAC): L 2–5; T Kaliyev (KAZ): L 1–5; Cheng XH (MAS): L 2–5	6	did not advance					27
Ali Owaida	Men's foil	S Lama (NEP): W 5–1; Son Y-k (KOR): L 1–5; H Yoong (MAS): L 2–5; M Zulfikar (INA): L 1–5; T Saito (JPN): L 0–5	6	did not advance					24
Nasr Al-Saadi	Men's sabre	Xu YM (CHN): L 1–5; SA Putra (MAS): W 5–4; Low HT (HKG): L 3–5; Vũ TA (VIE): L 0–5; M Abedini (IRI): L 0–5	5	did not advance					18
Ahmed Salmanpoor	Men's sabre	Nguyễn XL (VIE): L 2–5; IA Setiawan (INA): L 4–5; K Yoshida (JPN): L 1–5; A Pakdaman (IRI): L 0–5; Lam HC (HKG): L 1–5	6	did not advance					21
Thkrayat Al-Abdulla	Women's épée	K Ganbold (MGL): L 1–5; Nguyễn TNH (VIE): L 1–5; S Komata (JPN): L 2–5; V Kong (HKG): L 0–5; K Thanee (THA): L 0–5	6	did not advance					30
Wadha Al-Bdulla	Women's épée	R Alshamma (UAE): L 4–5; VA Lim (SGP): L 1–5; K Hsieh (HKG): L 1–5; W Takhamwong (THA): L 2–5; Zhu MY (CHN): L 3–5	6	did not advance					28

Team

Athlete	Event	Round of 16	Quarterfinals	Semifinals	Final	
Athlete	Event	Opposition score	Opposition score	Opposition score	Opposition score	Rank
Mohammed Al-Dosari; Mohammed Al-Shamari; Mohammed Mirzaei	Men's épée	Hong Kong (HKG); L 31–45	did not advance			10
Nasr Al-Saadi; Khalifa Al-Yazeedi; Ahmed Salmanpoor	Men's sabre	Indonesia (INA); L 27–45	did not advance			10

== Football ==
Qatar men's team played in the group B at the Games.

Summary

Team	Event	Group Stage				Round of 16	Quarterfinal	Semifinal	Final / BM	
Team	Event	Opposition Score	Opposition Score	Opposition Score	Rank	Opposition Score	Opposition Score	Opposition Score	Opposition Score	Rank
Qatar men's	Men's tournament	Thailand; D 1–1	Uzbekistan; L 0–6	Bangladesh; L 0–1	4	did not advance				21

=== Men's tournament ===
Roster

The following is the Qatar squad in the men's football tournament of the 2018 Asian Games. The team of 20 players was officially named on 8 August.

Manager: (Spain) Unai Melgosa

No.	Pos.	Player	Date of birth (age)	Club
1	GK	Mohamed Saeed Ibrahim	17 January 1998 (aged 20)	(Qatar Football Association) Al-Wakrah
2	DF	Tarek Salman	5 December 1997 (aged 20)	(Qatar Football Association) Al Sadd
3	DF	Elias Ahmed	12 December 1997 (aged 20)	(Qatar Football Association) Al-Gharafa
4	MF	Omar Al-Amadi	5 April 1995 (aged 23)	(Qatar Football Association) Qatar SC
5	DF	Tameem Al-Muhaza	21 July 1996 (aged 22)	(Qatar Football Association) Al-Gharafa
6	MF	Ahmed Fadhel*	7 April 1993 (aged 25)	(Qatar Football Association) Al-Wakrah
7	MF	Khalid Muneer	24 February 1998 (aged 20)	(Royal Spanish Football Federation) Astorga
8	FW	Hatim Kamal Hassanin	9 May 1997 (aged 21)	(Qatar Football Association) Al Sadd
9	FW	Meshaal Al-Shammeri	19 January 1995 (aged 23)	(Qatar Football Association) Al Sadd
10	FW	Saoud Farhan	11 February 1995 (aged 23)	(Tunisian Football Federation) CA Bizertin
11	MF	Nasser Ibrahim Al-Nassr	11 July 1995 (aged 23)	(Qatar Football Association) Al-Markhiya
12	DF	Jassem Mohammed Omar (captain)	18 April 1995 (aged 23)	(Qatar Football Association) Al-Ahli
13	DF	Meshaal Ibrahim	9 September 1998 (aged 19)	(Qatar Football Association) Al Sadd
14	FW	Ahmed Al Saadi	2 October 1995 (aged 22)	(Qatar Football Association) Al-Rayyan
15	MF	Adel Bader	17 January 1997 (aged 21)	(Qatar Football Association) Al-Duhail
16	MF	Hazem Shehata	2 February 1998 (aged 20)	(Qatar Football Association) Al-Duhail
17	MF	Abdurahman Mostafa	5 April 1997 (aged 21)	(Qatar Football Association) Al-Duhail
18	DF	Salah Al-Yahri	25 August 1995 (aged 22)	(Qatar Football Association) Al-Khor
21	GK	Marwan Badreldin	17 April 1999 (aged 19)	(Qatar Football Association) Al-Ahli
22	GK	Mohammed Al-Bakri	28 March 1997 (aged 21)	(Qatar Football Association) Al-Markhiya

* Over-aged player.

Pool B

Pos	Team	Pld	W	D	L	GF	GA	GD	Pts	Qualification
1	Uzbekistan	3	3	0	0	10	0	+10	9	Advance to knockout stage
2	Bangladesh	3	1	1	1	2	4	−2	4	Advance to knockout stage
3	Thailand	3	0	2	1	2	3	−1	2	
4	Qatar	3	0	1	2	1	8	−7	1	

Source: Asian Games 2018
Rules for classification: Group stage tiebreakers
14 August 2018
19:00 UTC+7

Thailand	1–1	Qatar
Supachai 90+2'	Report	Shehata 6'

Pakansari Stadium, Cibinong
Referee: Yu Ming-hsun (Chinese Taipei)

16 August 2018
19:00 UTC+7

Qatar	0–6	Uzbekistan
	Report	Urinboev 37'; Alibaev 43'; Khamdamov 47'; Sidikov 49'; Masharipov 54' (pen.); Abdikholikov 74'

Pakansari Stadium, Cibinong
Referee: Kim Dae-yong (South Korea)

19 August 2018
19:00 UTC+7

Bangladesh	1–0	Qatar
Bhuyan 90+3'	Report

Patriot Candrabhaga Stadium, Bekasi
Referee: Jansen Foo (Singapore)

== Golf ==
Men

Athlete	Event	Round 1	Round 2	Round 3	Round 4	Total		
Athlete	Event	Score	Score	Score	Score	Score	Par	Rank
Saleh Al-Kaabi	Individual	73	78	77	78	306	+18	47
Ali Al-Shahrani	Individual	76	81	79	75	311	+23	55
Jaham Al-Kuwari	Individual	85	75	81	75	316	+28	59
Abdulrahman Al-Shahrani	Individual	85	82	75	80	322	+34	69
Saleh Al-Kaabi; Ali Al-Shahrani; Jaham Al-Kuwari; Abdulrahman Al-Shahrani	Team	234	234	231	228	927	+63	14

== Handball ==
As the reigning champion, Qatar will compete at the Games with a strong 18-member squad.

Summary

Key:

- ET – After extra time
- P – Match decided by penalty-shootout.

Team	Event	Preliminary	Standing	Main / Class.	Rank / standing	Semifinals / Pl.	Final / BM / Pl.	
Team	Event	Opposition score	Standing	Opposition score	Rank / standing	Opposition score	Opposition score	Rank
Qatar men's	Men's tournament	Group A Malaysia: W 64–11; Iran: W 35–20	1 Q	Group I Iraq: W 26–20; Saudi Arabia: W 28–23; Japan: W 24–17	1 Q	South Korea; W 27–20	Bahrain; W 25–25 ^{ET: 7–2}	1st place, gold medalist(s)

=== Men's tournament ===
Roster

- Rasheed Yusuff
- Bertrand Roiné
- Rafael Capote
- Frankis Marzo
- Abdulrazzaq Murad
- Danijel Šarić
- Goran Stojanović
- Firas Chaieb
- Amine Guehis
- Allaedine Berrached
- Wajdi Sinen
- Ahmad Madadi
- Youssef Benali
- Moustafa Heiba
- Anis Zouaoui
- Ameen Zakkar

Group A

Pos	Team	Pld	W	D	L	GF	GA	GD	Pts	Qualification
1	Qatar	2	2	0	0	99	31	+68	4	Main round / Group 1–2
2	Iran	2	1	0	1	75	46	+29	2	Main round / Group 1–2
3	Malaysia	2	0	0	2	22	119	−97	0	Main round / Group 3

Source: AHF

13 August; 16:00	Malaysia	11–64	Qatar	POPKI Sports Hall, Jakarta; Referees: Shakir, Kadhim (IRQ)
13 August; 16:00	Ismail, Kamal 3	(7–33)	Zouaoui 18	POPKI Sports Hall, Jakarta; Referees: Shakir, Kadhim (IRQ)
13 August; 16:00	2× (yellow card) 1× (suspension)			POPKI Sports Hall, Jakarta; Referees: Shakir, Kadhim (IRQ)

17 August; 16:00	Qatar	35–20	Iran	POPKI Sports Hall, Jakarta; Referees: Lee, Koo (KOR)
17 August; 16:00	Heiba 6	(18–6)	Rostami, Kazemi 4	POPKI Sports Hall, Jakarta; Referees: Lee, Koo (KOR)
17 August; 16:00	3× (yellow card) 2× (suspension)		2× (yellow card) 5× (suspension) 1× (red card)	POPKI Sports Hall, Jakarta; Referees: Lee, Koo (KOR)

Main round (Group I)

Pos	Team	Pld	W	D	L	GF	GA	GD	Pts	Qualification
1	Qatar	3	3	0	0	78	60	+18	6	Semifinals
2	Japan	3	1	1	1	70	74	−4	3	Semifinals
3	Saudi Arabia	3	0	2	1	69	74	−5	2	Classification 5th–6th
4	Iraq	3	0	1	2	64	73	−9	1	Classification 7th–8th

Source: AHF

20 August; 16:00	Iraq	20–26	Qatar	POPKI Sports Hall, Jakarta; Referees: Tavakkoli, Valadkhanian (IRI)
20 August; 16:00	Ghassab 5	(9–15)	Heiba, Zouaoui 5	POPKI Sports Hall, Jakarta; Referees: Tavakkoli, Valadkhanian (IRI)
20 August; 16:00	1× (yellow card) 2× (suspension)		2× (yellow card) 4× (suspension)	POPKI Sports Hall, Jakarta; Referees: Tavakkoli, Valadkhanian (IRI)

22 August; 20:00	Qatar	28–23	Saudi Arabia	POPKI Sports Hall, Jakarta; Referees: Lee, Koo (KOR)
22 August; 20:00	Capote 6	(16–10)	Al-Hammad 6	POPKI Sports Hall, Jakarta; Referees: Lee, Koo (KOR)
22 August; 20:00	3× (yellow card) 3× (suspension)		3× (yellow card) 4× (suspension) 1× (red card)	POPKI Sports Hall, Jakarta; Referees: Lee, Koo (KOR)

24 August; 20:00	Qatar	24–17	Japan	POPKI Sports Hall, Jakarta; Referees: Shakir, Kadhim (IRQ)
24 August; 20:00	Zouaoui 6	(13–10)	Higashinagahama 6	POPKI Sports Hall, Jakarta; Referees: Shakir, Kadhim (IRQ)
24 August; 20:00	1× (yellow card) 5× (suspension)		2× (yellow card) 4× (suspension)	POPKI Sports Hall, Jakarta; Referees: Shakir, Kadhim (IRQ)

Semifinals

27 August; 14:00	Qatar	27–20	South Korea	POPKI Sports Hall, Jakarta; Referees: Shakir, Kadhim (IRQ)
27 August; 14:00	Madadi 6	(13–7)	Lee H. 7	POPKI Sports Hall, Jakarta; Referees: Shakir, Kadhim (IRQ)
27 August; 14:00	4× (yellow card) 2× (suspension)		1× (yellow card) 3× (suspension)	POPKI Sports Hall, Jakarta; Referees: Shakir, Kadhim (IRQ)

Gold medal game

31 August
18:00
Qatar
32–27 (ET)
Bahrain
POPKI Sports Hall, Jakarta
Referees: Hizaki, Ikebuchi (JPN)
Zouaoui 7
(13–14)
Al-Sayyad 5
3× (yellow card) 3× (suspension)

4× (yellow card) 5× (suspension)

FT: 25–25 ET: 7–2

== Judo ==
Qatar put up 2 judokas at the Games.

Key:

- 1st number — Ippon
- 2nd number — Waza-ari
- s — Shido

Men

Athlete	Event	Round of 32	Round of 16	Quarterfinals	Semifinals	Repechage	Final / BM	Rank
Athlete	Event	Opposition Result	Opposition Result	Opposition Result	Opposition Result	Opposition Result	Opposition Result	Rank
Ayoub El-Idrissi	–66 kg	Bye	Chui CS (HKG); W 10s1–00	An B-u (KOR); L 00s1–01s2	Did not advance	Kim H-u (PRK); W 10s2–00s3	Y Zhumakanov (KAZ); L 00s1–10s1	–
Khalil Rebahi	–73 kg	Lee KW (HKG); W 00s1–00	B Khojazoda (TJK); L 01s1–10s1	did not advance				

== Karate ==
Qatar participated in the karate competition at the Games with three men's athletes.

== Paragliding ==
Men

Athlete	Event	Round										Total	Rank
Athlete	Event	1	2	3	4	5	6	7	8	9	10	Total	Rank
Abdullatif Al-Qahtani	Individual accuracy	~~500~~	500	500	366	22	500	500	500	22	500	3410	33
Abdullatif Al-Qahtani; Ali Al-Yafei	Team accuracy	2007	2076	2003	1874	1869	2020	—N/a				11849	13

== Rowing ==
Women

Athlete	Event	Heats		Repechage		Final	
Athlete	Event	Time	Rank	Time	Rank	Time	Rank
Tala Abu-Jbara	Single sculls	9:28.28	3 R	8:54.31	3 FB	8:36.79	7

== Sailing ==
Men

Athlete	Event	Race												Total	Rank
Athlete	Event	1	2	3	4	5	6	7	8	9	10	11	12	Total	Rank
Waleed Al-Sharshani	Laser	7	~~(10)~~	10	8	9	10	9	10	7	4	9	8	91	9

Mixed

Athlete	Event	Race												Total	Rank
Athlete	Event	1	2	3	4	5	6	7	8	9	10	11	12	Total	Rank
Abdulrahman Al-Nasr	Laser 4.7	13	15	11	10	11	5	12	15	14	19	~~(20)~~	7	132	14

== Shooting ==
Qatar competed in shooting competition at the Games. Hamad Ali Al-Marri became the first Qatari athletes who took the medals, by winning the bronze in the men's double trap event.

Men

Athlete	Event	Qualification		Final	
Athlete	Event	Points	Rank	Points	Rank
Osama Al-Shaiba	10 m air pistol	554	35	did not advance	
Ahmed Al-Shamari	25 m rapid fire pistol	561	17	did not advance	
Mohamed Hassan Al-Tamimi	25 m rapid fire pistol	553	19	did not advance	
Ahmed Mohsen Al-Ali	10 m air rifle	609.9	35	did not advance	
Ali Al-Muhannadi	10 m air rifle	603.8	40	did not advance	
Ali Al-Muhannadi	50 m rifle three positions	1135	22	did not advance	
Mohamed Abdelmohsin Abouteama	10 m running target	563	8	did not advance	
Mohamed Abdelmohsin Abouteama	10 m running target mixed	—N/a		362	12
Ahmed Al-Rumaihi	Trap	117	11	did not advance	
Mohammed Ali Khejaim	Trap	114	20	did not advance	
Hamad Al-Marri	Double trap	139	2 Q	53	3rd place, bronze medalist(s)
Abdulbaset Mohsin	Double trap	128	13	did not advance	
Nasser Al-Attiyah	Skeet	121	8	did not advance	
Rashid Saleh Hamad	Skeet	119	16	did not advance	

Women

Athlete	Event	Qualification		Final	
Athlete	Event	Points	Rank	Points	Rank
Al-Dana Al-Mubarak	10 m air pistol	566	16	did not advance	
Nasra Mohammed	10 m air pistol	566	17	did not advance	
Al-Dana Al-Mubarak	25 m pistol	570	24	did not advance	
Nasra Mohammed	25 m pistol	565	26	did not advance	
Matara Fahad Al Aseiri	10 m air rifle	599.4	41	did not advance	
Haya Al-Boloushi	10 m air rifle	DNS			
Matara Fahad Al Aseiri	50 m rifle three positions	1105	31	did not advance	
Amna Mesaad Al Abdulla	Trap	111	11	did not advance	
Kholoud Hassan Al Khalaf	Trap	105	22	did not advance	
Amna Mesaad Al Abdulla	Double trap	—N/a		102	12
Kholoud Hassan Al Khalaf	Double trap	—N/a		106	11
Hajar Ghulam Mohammed	Skeet	102	17	did not advance	
Sarah Ghulam Mohammed	Skeet	110	13	did not advance	

Mixed team

Athlete	Event	Qualification		Final	
Athlete	Event	Points	Rank	Points	Rank
Osama Al-Shaiba; Al-Dana Al-Mubarak	10 m air pistol	745	17	did not advance	
Ali Al-Muhannadi; Matara Fahad Al Aseiri	10 m air rifle	800.7	21	did not advance	
Mohammed Ahmed Al Rumaihi; Kholoud Hassan Al Khalaf	Trap	138	7	did not advance	

== Squash ==
Singles

Athlete	Event	Round of 32	Round of 16	Quarterfinals	Semifinals	Final	
Athlete	Event	Opposition score	Opposition score	Opposition score	Opposition score	Opposition score	Rank
Abdulla Al-Tamimi	Men's	BO Davaasuren (MGL); W 3–0	R Tsukue (JPN); W 3–1	M N Adnan (MAS); L 2–3	did not advance		
Syed Azlan Amjad	Men's	BA Enkhbold (MGL); W 3–0	M N Adnan (MAS); L 0–3	did not advance			

Team

Athlete	Event	Group Stage						Semifinal	Final	
Athlete	Event	Opposition Score	Opposition Score	Opposition Score	Opposition Score	Opposition Score	Rank	Opposition Score	Opposition Score	Rank
Abdulla Al-Tamimi; Syed Azlan Amjad; Hamad Al-Amri; Abdulrahman Al-Malki	Men's	Thailand (THA); W 3–0	Indonesia (INA); W 2–1	India (IND); L 1–2	Malaysia (MAS); L 1–2	Singapore (SGP); L 1–2	4	did not advance		

== Swimming ==
Men

Athlete	Event	Heats		Final	
Athlete	Event	Time	Rank	Time	Rank
Mohamed Abdelrahman	200 m breaststroke	2:31.22	18	did not advance	
Mohamed Abdelrahman	200 m individual medley	2:16.84	17	did not advance	
Mohamed Abdelrahman	400 m individual medley	4:46.30	15	did not advance	
Noah Al-Khulaifi	50 m freestyle	24.64	37	did not advance	
Noah Al-Khulaifi	50 m backstroke	28.75	27	did not advance	
Noah Al-Khulaifi	50 m butterfly	25.70	29	did not advance	
Yacob Al-Khulaifi	50 m freestyle	24.89	39	did not advance	
Yacob Al-Khulaifi	50 m butterfly	26.30	33	did not advance	
Yacob Al-Khulaifi	100 m butterfly	56.94	25	did not advance	
Mesalam Al-Nabit	200 m backstroke	2:24.94	21	did not advance	
Hassan Al-Obaidan	100 m backstroke	1:08.62	26	did not advance	
Abdulaziz Al-Obaidly	50 m backstroke	28.78	28	did not advance	
Abdulaziz Al-Obaidly	100 m backstroke	1:02.28	21	did not advance	
Abdulaziz Al-Obaidly	200 m backstroke	2:13.92	17	did not advance	
Abdulaziz Al-Obaidly	50 m breaststroke	31.43	27	did not advance	
Youssef Mohamed	200 m freestyle	2:06.28	29	did not advance	
Youssef Mohamed	50 m breaststroke	32.23	31	did not advance	
Youssef Mohamed	100 m breaststroke	1:11.47	28	did not advance	
Firas Saidi	100 m freestyle	53.45	33	did not advance	
Firas Saidi	200 m freestyle	2:01.59	28	did not advance	
Firas Saidi; Abdulaziz Al-Obaidly; Youssef Mohamed; Yacob Al-Khulaifi	4×100 m freestyle relay	3:44.36	13	did not advance	
Firas Saidi; Abdulaziz Al-Obaidly; Youssef Mohamed; Yacob Al-Khulaifi	4×200 m freestyle relay	8:22.53	10	did not advance	
Abdulaziz Al-Obaidly; Mohamed Abdelrahman; Firas Saidi; Youssef Mohamed	4×100 m medley relay	4:15.23	16	did not advance	

== Table tennis ==
Individual

Athlete	Event	Round 1	Round 2	Round of 16	Quarterfinals	Semifinals	Final	
Athlete	Event	Opposition score	Opposition score	Opposition score	Opposition score	Opposition score	Opposition score	Rank
Abdulrahman Al-Naggar	Men's singles	T Sagyndykov (KGZ); W 4–1	Pak S-h (PRK); L 2–4	did not advance				
Mohammed Abdulhussein	Men's singles	M Rameez (PAK); W 4–1	Gao N (SGP); L 0–4	did not advance				
Aya Majdi	Women's singles	AI Ansari (PAK); L 2–4	did not advance					
Maha Faramarzi	Women's singles	BE Batmunkh (MGL); L 2–4	did not advance					
Abdulrahman Al-Naggar; Maha Faramarzi	Mixed doubles	A Lal Malla / S Nembang (PAK); L 2–3	did not advance					
Mohammed Abdulhussein; Aya Majdi	Mixed doubles	Bye	Lim J-h / Yang H-e (KOR); L 0–3	did not advance				

Team

Athlete	Event	Group Stage					Quarterfinal	Semifinal	Final	
Athlete	Event	Opposition Score	Opposition Score	Opposition Score	Opposition Score	Rank	Opposition Score	Opposition Score	Opposition Score	Rank
Shouq Abdulla; Maryam Ali; Maha Faramarzi; Aya Majdi; Maha Ali	Women's	India (IND); L 0–3	Iran (IRI); L 0–3	China (CHN); L 0–3	—N/a	4	did not advance			

== Taekwondo ==
Poomsae

Athlete	Event	Round of 16	Quarterfinal	Semifinal	Final	
Athlete	Event	Opposition Score	Opposition Score	Opposition Score	Opposition Score	Rank
Huda Akbar	Women's individual	Yap K W (HKG); L 6.95–7.87	did not advance			

Kyorugi

Athlete	Event	Round of 32	Round of 16	Quarterfinal	Semifinal	Final	
Athlete	Event	Opposition Score	Opposition Score	Opposition Score	Opposition Score	Opposition Score	Rank
Ahmed Dghbas	Men's −63 kg	J Agojo (PHI); L 28−41	did not advance				
Ali Al-Araimi	Men's −80 kg	Bye	A Aitakhunov (KGZ); L 19−22	did not advance			

== Tennis ==
Men

Athlete	Event	Round of 64	Round of 32	Round of 16	Quarterfinals	Semifinals	Final	
Athlete	Event	Opposition score	Opposition score	Opposition score	Opposition score	Opposition score	Opposition score	Rank
Jabor Al-Mutawa	Singles	Wong H-k (HKG); L 3–6, 3–6	did not advance					
Mubarak Shannan Zayid	Singles	P Kovapitukted (THA); L 3–6, 4–6	did not advance					
Jabor Al-Mutawa; Mubarak Shannan Zayid	Doubles	F Alcantara / J Patrombon (PHI); L 4–6, 2–6	did not advance					

== Triathlon ==
Individual

Athlete	Event	Swim (1.5 km)	Trans 1	Bike (39.6 km)	Trans 2	Run (10 km)	Total Time	Rank
Ebrahim Al-Romaihi	Men's	24:33	0:31	1:04:04	0:27	43:59	2:13:34	26

== Volleyball ==
Qatar participated in the beach volleyball competition with two men's team. The world 10th ranked, Ahmed Janko and Cherif Samba captured the fourth gold medal for the contingent, after won the title on 28 August. Qatar also competed in the men's indoor competition and drawn in the pool F.

=== Beach volleyball ===
Athlete	Event	Preliminary		Round of 16	Quarterfinals	Semifinals	Final / BM	
Athlete	Event	Oppositions scores	Rank	Opposition score	Opposition score	Opposition score	Opposition score	Rank
Ahmed Janko; Cherif Samba	Men's tournament	Yakovlev – Bogatu (KAZ): W 2–0; Kim J-y – Kim H-c (KOR): W 2–0; Yapa – Pradeep (SRI): W 2–0	1 Q	Kuleshov – Babichev (KAZ); W 2–0	Vakili – Salemiinjehboroun (IRI); W 2–1	Gao – Li (CHN); W 2–0	Rachmawan – Ashfiya (INA); W 2–0	1st place, gold medalist(s)
Tamer Abdelrasoul; Mahdi Sammoud	Men's tournament	Jongklang – Khaolumtarn (THA): L 0–2; Ismail – Waahid (MDV): W 2–1; Vakili – Salemiinjehboroun (IRI): L 1–2	3	did not advance				

=== Indoor volleyball ===
Team	Event	Group Stage		Playoffs	Quarterfinals / Pl.	Semifinals / Pl.	Final / BM / Pl.	
Team	Event	Oppositions scores	Rank	Opposition score	Opposition score	Opposition score	Opposition score	Rank
Qatar men's	Men's tournament	Maldives: W 3–0; India: W 3–0; Hong Kong: W 3–0	1 Q	Myanmar; W 3–0	Japan; W 3–2	Iran; L 0–3	Chinese Taipei; L 1–3	4

==== Men's tournament ====
Team roster

The following is the Qatar roster in the men's volleyball tournament of the 2018 Asian Games.

Head coach: (Argentina) Camilo Soto

No.	Name	Date of birth	Height	Weight	Spike	Block	Club
3	Ahmed Mahmoud	20 February 1987	1.90 m (6 ft 3 in)	85 kg (187 lb)	330 cm (130 in)	310 cm (120 in)	(Qatar) Al Ahli
4	Renan Ribeiro	30 December 1989	1.95 m (6 ft 5 in)	90 kg (200 lb)	330 cm (130 in)	318 cm (125 in)	(Qatar) Al Arabi
5	Sultan Abdalla	1 November 1997	1.90 m (6 ft 3 in)	85 kg (187 lb)	310 cm (120 in)	300 cm (120 in)	Qatar SC
6	Sulaiman Saad	30 June 1987	1.75 m (5 ft 9 in)	75 kg (165 lb)	291 cm (115 in)	274 cm (108 in)	(Qatar) Al Rayyan
7	Belal Abunabot	1 January 1991	2.00 m (6 ft 7 in)	90 kg (200 lb)	355 cm (140 in)	330 cm (130 in)	(Qatar) Al Rayyan
9	Miloš Stevanović	27 September 1988	1.94 m (6 ft 4 in)	85 kg (187 lb)	323 cm (127 in)	300 cm (120 in)	(Qatar) Al Rayyan
10	Ndir Sadikh	2 February 1986	2.00 m (6 ft 7 in)	90 kg (200 lb)	340 cm (130 in)	333 cm (131 in)	(Qatar) Police
11	Nikola Vasić	4 June 1989	1.96 m (6 ft 5 in)	90 kg (200 lb)	350 cm (140 in)	335 cm (132 in)	(Qatar) Al-Wakrah
12	Mubarak Hammad	1 April 1991	2.00 m (6 ft 7 in)	85 kg (187 lb)	330 cm (130 in)	310 cm (120 in)	(Qatar) Al Rayyan
13	Osman Wagihalla	1 January 1993	1.90 m (6 ft 3 in)	80 kg (180 lb)	300 cm (120 in)	280 cm (110 in)	(Qatar) Al Sadd
15	Ali Kanani	2 September 1991	1.75 m (5 ft 9 in)	80 kg (180 lb)	250 cm (98 in)	240 cm (94 in)	(Qatar) Al Ahli
16	Ibrahim (c)	15 January 1985	2.07 m (6 ft 9 in)	90 kg (200 lb)	340 cm (130 in)	340 cm (130 in)	(Qatar) Al Arabi
17	Ahmed Noaman	18 April 1994	2.02 m (6 ft 8 in)	85 kg (187 lb)	330 cm (130 in)	310 cm (120 in)	(Qatar) Al-Shamal
20	Khaled Shamiyeh	4 April 1995	1.90 m (6 ft 3 in)	78 kg (172 lb)	355 cm (140 in)	340 cm (130 in)	(Qatar) Al Arabi

Pool F

Pos	Team	Pld	W	L	Pts	SW	SL	SR	SPW	SPL	SPR	Qualification
1	Qatar	3	3	0	9	9	0	MAX	225	143	1.573	Classification for 1–12
2	India	3	2	1	6	6	3	2.000	207	191	1.084	Classification for 1–12
3	Hong Kong	3	1	2	3	3	6	0.500	197	206	0.956	Classification for 13–20
4	Maldives	3	0	3	0	0	9	0.000	136	225	0.604	Classification for 13–20

Source: OCA

Date	Time		Score		Set 1	Set 2	Set 3	Set 4	Set 5	Total	Report
20 Aug	19:00	Qatar	3–0	Maldives	25–11	25–8	25–13			75–32	Report
22 Aug	19:00	India	0–3	Qatar	15–25	20–25	20–25			55–75	Report
24 Aug	19:00	Qatar	3–0	Hong Kong	25–16	25–22	25–18			75–56	Report
26 Aug	19:00	Qatar	3–0	Myanmar	25–21	25–18	25–20			75–59	Report
28 Aug	19:00	Japan	2–3	Qatar	18–25	28–26	21–25	25–22	22–24	114–122	Report
30 Aug	19:00	Iran	3–0	Qatar	25–23	25–19	25–18			75–60	Report
01 Sep	10:00	Chinese Taipei	3–1	Qatar	25–22	25–23	17–25	25–16		92–86	Report

== Weightlifting ==
Qatar put up their weightlifter at the Games. The 20 years old Faris Ibrahim won a silver in the 94 kg on 25 August.

Men

Athlete	Event	Snatch		Clean & Jerk		Total	Rank
Athlete	Event	Result	Rank	Result	Rank	Total	Rank
Faris Ibrahim	−94 kg	166	4	215	2	381	2nd place, silver medalist(s)

== Wrestling ==
Qatar competed in freestyle and Greco-Roman event at the wrestling competition. Abdulrahman Ibrahim reaching into the bronze medal match but losing to Japanese wrestler.

Key:

- F – Victory by fall.
- PP – Decision by points – the loser with technical points.
- PO – Decision by points – the loser without technical points.
- ST – Great superiority – the loser without technical points and a margin of victory of at least 8 (Greco-Roman) or 10 (freestyle) points.

Men's freestyle

Athlete	Event	Qualification	Round of 16	Quarterfinal	Semifinal	Repechage 1	Repechage 2	Final / BM	
Athlete	Event	Opposition Result	Opposition Result	Opposition Result	Opposition Result	Opposition Result	Opposition Result	Opposition Result	Rank
Abdulrahman Ibrahim	−74 kg	Bye	Kaisanov (KAZ); L 0–10	did not advance		Bye	Cấn T D (VIE); W 6^{PP}–10	Gong B-m (KOR); L 0–10	5

Men's Greco-Roman

Athlete	Event	Round of 16	Quarterfinal	Semifinal	Repechage	Final / BM	
Athlete	Event	Opposition Result	Opposition Result	Opposition Result	Opposition Result	Opposition Result	Rank
Bakhit Sharif Badr	−77 kg	Ş Permanow (TKM); L 0–5	did not advance				11

== See also ==
- Qatar at the 2018 Asian Para Games
