= Shooting at the 2018 Asian Games – Men's double trap =

Men's double trap at the 2018 Asian Games
- Venue: Jakabaring Shooting Range
- Dates: 23 August 2018
- Competitors: 21 from 12 nations

Medalists
gold medal	Shin Hyun-woo	South Korea
silver medal	Shardul Vihan	India
bronze medal	Hamad Al-Marri	Qatar

The men's double trap event at the 2018 Asian Games in Palembang, Indonesia took place on 23 August at the Jakabaring International Shooting Range.

== Schedule ==
All times are Western Indonesia Time (UTC+07:00)

Date	Time	Event
Thursday, 23 August 2018	10:30	Qualification
Thursday, 23 August 2018	15:30	Final

== Records ==
Prior to this competition, the existing world, Asian and Games records were as follows.

World Record	Tim Kneale (GBR)	148	Munich, Germany	9 June 2014
Asian Record	Wang Hao (CHN)	146	Munich, Germany	9 June 2014
Games Record	Fehaid Al-Deehani (KUW)	142	Incheon, South Korea	25 September 2014

== Results ==
Legend

- DNS — Did not start

=== Qualification ===
Rank	Athlete	Round					Total	S-off	Notes
Rank	Athlete	1	2	3	4	5	Total	S-off	Notes
1	Shardul Vihan (IND)	28	28	29	27	29	141		
2	Hamad Al-Marri (QAT)	26	28	29	29	27	139		
3	Shin Hyun-woo (KOR)	29	30	26	24	29	138	+10	
4	Liu Anlong (CHN)	29	27	24	29	29	138	+9	
5	Khaled Al-Kaabi (UAE)	26	27	28	29	27	137	+4	
6	Hwang Sung-jin (KOR)	26	27	27	29	28	137	+3	
7	Qi Ying (CHN)	28	29	25	24	29	135		
8	Aamer Iqbal (PAK)	26	26	28	27	27	134		
9	Ankur Mittal (IND)	27	28	26	27	26	134		
10	Hussein Al-Shuhoumi (OMA)	28	26	27	28	25	134		
11	Muhammad Farrukh Nadeem (PAK)	28	27	26	24	28	133		
12	Ahmad Al-Afasi (KUW)	26	28	26	25	27	132		
13	Abdulbaset Mohsin (QAT)	26	26	26	25	25	128		
14	Chuang Han-lin (TPE)	27	28	26	23	24	128		
15	Maxim Kolomoyets (KAZ)	25	25	26	25	26	127		
16	Saad Al-Mutairi (KUW)	25	26	27	27	22	127		
17	Viktor Khassyanov (KAZ)	27	27	23	25	23	125		
18	Eng Wei Jin (MAS)	23	26	26	24	25	124		
19	Anas Muhsinun Joko Santoso (INA)	19	18	22	21	23	103		
20	Slamet Riadi (INA)	18	20	18	19	21	96		
—	Juma Al-Maktoum (UAE)						DNS		

=== Final ===
Rank	Athlete	1st stage		2nd stage – Elimination						S-off
Rank	Athlete	1	2	1	2	3	4	5	6	S-off
1st place, gold medalist(s)	Shin Hyun-woo (KOR)	9	19	28	37	47	56	66	74	
2nd place, silver medalist(s)	Shardul Vihan (IND)	10	19	28	37	45	55	64	73	
3rd place, bronze medalist(s)	Hamad Al-Marri (QAT)	8	17	27	36	45	53			
4	Liu Anlong (CHN)	8	17	27	36	43				
5	Hwang Sung-jin (KOR)	7	17	26	36					
6	Khaled Al-Kaabi (UAE)	7	15	24						
