= Bowling at the 2018 Asian Games – Men's team =

Men's team of 6 at the 2018 Asian Games
- Venue: Jakabaring Bowling Center
- Date: 25 August 2018
- Competitors: 94 from 17 nations

Medalists
gold medal	South Korea; Choi Bok-eum, Hong Hae-sol, Park Jong-woo, Kim Jong-wook, Koo Seong-hoi, Kang Hee-won
silver medal	Hong Kong; Ivan Tse, Lau Kwun Ho, Wong Kwan Yuen, Eric Tseng, Michael Mak, Wu Siu Hong
bronze medal	Chinese Taipei; Wu Hao-ming, Chen Hsin-an, Hung Kun-yi, Chen Ming-tang, Lin Pai-feng, Hsieh Chin-liang

The men's team of six competition at the 2018 Asian Games in Palembang was held on 25 August 2018 at Jakabaring Bowling Center.

Block 1 were played on long oil pattern lane, while Block 2 were played on medium oil pattern lane.

== Schedule ==
All times are Western Indonesia Time (UTC+07:00)

Date	Time	Event
Saturday, 25 August 2018	09:00	1st block
Saturday, 25 August 2018	15:00	2nd block

== Results ==
Rank	Team	Game						Total
Rank	Team	1	2	3	4	5	6	Total
1st place, gold medalist(s)	South Korea (KOR)	1519	1394	1465	1397	1452	1313	8540
	Choi Bok-eum	269	245	199	187	203	246	1349
	Hong Hae-sol	253	232	267	246	207	243	1448
	Park Jong-woo	264	245	279	234	265	230	1517
	Kim Jong-wook	266	217	221	245	266	179	1394
	Koo Seong-hoi	211	235	243	231	256	233	1409
	Kang Hee-won	256	220	256	254	255	182	1423
2nd place, silver medalist(s)	Hong Kong (HKG)	1360	1459	1320	1447	1406	1183	8175
	Ivan Tse	187	264	224	242	267	171	1355
	Lau Kwun Ho	213	265	213	211	192	198	1292
	Wong Kwan Yuen	208	222	241	254	232	218	1375
	Eric Tseng	257	244	201	244	208	173	1327
	Michael Mak	252	256	220	251	276	199	1454
	Wu Siu Hong	243	208	221	245	231	224	1372
3rd place, bronze medalist(s)	Chinese Taipei (TPE)	1253	1395	1411	1374	1315	1418	8166
	Wu Hao-ming	179	268	241	207	207	233	1335
	Chen Hsin-an	178	225	241	213	266	234	1357
	Hung Kun-yi	201	196	245	244	221	243	1350
	Chen Ming-tang	230	220	230	244	189	278	1391
	Lin Pai-feng	255	242	245	201	233	289	1465
	Hsieh Chin-liang	210	244	209	265	199	141	1268
4	Japan (JPN)	1389	1361	1377	1339	1396	1269	8131
	Tomoyuki Sasaki	233	221	220	194	255	211	1334
	Shogo Wada	223	242	221	227	188	256	1357
	Shusaku Asato	255	201	206	165	277	180	1284
	Daisuke Yoshida	179	254	243	243	242	186	1347
	Takuya Miyazawa	263	199	255	256	236	204	1413
	Shota Koki	236	244	232	254	198	232	1396
5	Indonesia (INA)	1381	1409	1288	1335	1351	1356	8120
	Yeri Ramadona	207	211	197	243	185	255	1298
	Diwan Rezaldy	220	211	199	201	204	177	1212
	Fachri Ibnu Askar	254	214	206	199	223	246	1342
	Billy Muhammad Islam	211	273	224	207	218	208	1341
	Hardy Rachmadian	225	257	210	242	267	202	1403
	Ryan Leonard Lalisang	264	243	252	243	254	268	1524
6	Thailand (THA)	1325	1349	1383	1300	1405	1310	8072
	Kim Bolleby	179	154	219	201	221	231	1205
	Atchariya Cheng	220	233	254	205	239	250	1401
	Sithiphol Kunaksorn	233	245	210	211	227	252	1378
	Surasak Manuwong	217	257	200	243	222	188	1327
	Annop Arromsaranon	244	246	277	212	276	167	1422
	Yannaphon Larpapharat	232	214	223	228	220	222	1339
7	Malaysia (MAS)	1368	1243	1301	1374	1336	1420	8042
	Timmy Tan	196	160	221	213	208	245	1243
	Ahmad Muaz Fishol	224	179	241	220	219	211	1294
	Alex Liew	231	211	245	197	203	220	1307
	Adrian Ang	242	219	203	277	244	222	1407
	Syafiq Ridhwan	211	231	177	245	230	254	1348
	Muhammad Rafiq Ismail	264	243	214	222	232	268	1443
8	Philippines (PHI)	1317	1286	1451	1314	1348	1311	8027
	Kenneth Chua	202	239	241	241	232	224	1379
	Kenzo Umali	265	195	265	190	159	224	1298
	Jomar Jumapao	205	209	245	190	230	219	1298
	Raoul Miranda	221	243	234	209	241	190	1338
	Merwin Tan	223	177	208	220	223	255	1306
	Enrico Hernandez	201	223	258	264	263	199	1408
9	Qatar (QAT)	1317	1371	1409	1293	1276	1291	7957
	Jassim Al-Merikhi	244	289	252	199	222	175	1381
	Ahmed Al-Deyab	226	262	246	212	224	242	1412
	Ali Al-Janahi	255	234	277	220	181	185	1352
	Yousef Al-Jaber	235	231	199	232	228	265	1390
	Mohammed Al-Merikhi	168	179	213	190	166	224	1140
	Ghanim Aboujassoum	189	176	222	240	255	200	1282
10	Saudi Arabia (KSA)	1311	1347	1359	1399	1273	1236	7925
	Yousef Akbar	213	252	193	223	179	223	1283
	Adel Al-Bariqi	224	245	210	200	195	220	1294
	Sultan Al-Masri	237	188	234	268	208	203	1338
	Ammar Tarrad	228	214	232	208	234	200	1316
	Abdulrahman Al-Kheliwi	229	225	256	244	226	181	1361
	Hassan Al-Shaikh	180	223	234	256	231	209	1333
11	Singapore (SGP)	1340	1373	1282	1165	1328	1415	7903
	Basil Ng	212	220	238	194	236	241	1341
	Jonovan Neo	211	221	235	185	234	209	1295
	Cheah Ray Han	222	221	188	210	215	267	1323
	Alex Chong	210	232	176	168	170	206	1162
	Darren Ong	234	256	189	220	219	256	1374
	Jaris Goh	251	223	256	188	254	236	1408
12	Bahrain (BRN)	1302	1272	1332	1371	1223	1363	7863
	Ahmed Al-Awadhi	190	163	205	234	210	197	1199
	Omar Al-Mudhahki	179	224	212	205	176	224	1220
	Ahmed Al-Goud	266	200	243	255	188	196	1348
	Abdulla Abdulkarim Ali	200	218	211	220	218	233	1300
	Osama Abdulrahman Hasan	212	244	229	234	210	268	1397
	Yusuf Mohamed Falah	255	223	232	223	221	245	1399
13	India (IND)	1360	1294	1222	1334	1208	1240	7658
	Parvez Ahmed Saud	256	219	234	224	190	257	1380
	Shoumick Datta	158	225	207	223	158	201	1172
	Kishan Ramachandraiah	239	220	214	196	224	221	1314
	Akaash Ashok Kumar	209	203	201	201	212	201	1227
	Shabbir Dhankot	223	232	166	225	207	189	1242
	Dhruv Sarda	275	195	200	265	217	171	1323
14	Macau (MAC)	1279	1299	1158	1216	1229	1176	7357
	Zoe Dias Ma	233	224	209	213	191	233	1303
	Ho Man Lok	222	251	212	235	191	204	1315
	Leong Chou Kin	233	180	173	155	213	201	1155
	Tam Tsz Sun	185	221	219	200	203	199	1227
	Man Si Kei	172	212	200	218	222	150	1174
	Lee Tak Man	234	211	145	195	209	189	1183
15	Mongolia (MGL)	1035	1130	1197	1128	1159	1056	6705
	Tsedendambyn Lkhaasüren	190	180	203	210	167	188	1138
	Khürelbaataryn Khishigbat	147	190	234	234	221	179	1205
	Jarantain Tsevegmid	181	187	163	169	198	159	1057
	Enkhtöriin Amgalanbat	178	189	174	188	158	165	1052
	Dorjiin Chuluunbaatar	178	193	215	159	197	184	1126
	Jamtsyn Sodnomdorj	161	191	208	168	218	181	1127
16	Vietnam (VIE)	460	311	405	437	372	391	2376
	Trần Anh Tuấn	195	146	195	267	181	222	1206
	Nguyễn Văn Hoàng	265	165	210	170	191	169	1170
17	Kazakhstan (KAZ)	394	427	409	355	342	339	2266
	Ruslan Ekkel	169	256	241	176	187	202	1231
	Zhaksylyk Saudabayev	225	171	168	179	155	137	1035
