= Ahmad Madadi =

Qatari handball player (born 1994)

Personal information
- Nationality: Qatari
- Born: 31 August 1994 (age 32)
- Height: 1.75 m (5 ft 9 in)

Sport
- Sport: Handball
- Position: Left wing
- Current club: Al-Duhail
- Number: 7

Senior clubs
- Years: Team
- 2014-2017: Lekhwiya SC
- 2017-: Al-Duhail
National team
Years	Team	Apps	(Gls)
–	Qatar	83	(298)
Medal record
Men's handball
Representing Qatar
Asian Games
Gold medal – first place	2018 Jakarta	Team
Gold medal – first place	2022 Hangzhou	Team
Silver medal – second place	2026 Aichi–Nagoya	Team
Asian Championship
Gold medal – first place	2018 South Korea
Gold medal – first place	2020 Kuwait
Gold medal – first place	2022 Saudi Arabia
Gold medal – first place	2024 Bahrain
Silver medal – second place	2026 Kuwait
Islamic Solidarity Games
Silver medal – second place	2025 Riyadh	Team

Ahmad Madadi (born 31 August 1994) is a Qatari handball player for captains both Al-Duhail and the Qatari national team.

He participated at the 2017 and the 2019 World Men's Handball Championship.

== Individual awards ==
All-Star Team

- All-Star Left Wing of the Asian Championship: 2026
