= Anis Zouaoui =

Qatari handball player (born 1992)

Personal information
- Nationality: Qatari
- Born: 7 February 1992 (age 34)
- Height: 1.84 m (6 ft 0 in)

Sport
- Sport: Handball
- Position: Left wing
- Current club: Al Arabi
- Number: 92
National team
Years	Team	Apps	(Gls)
–	Qatar	25	(105)
Medal record
Men's handball
Representing Qatar
Asian Championship
Gold medal – first place	2018 South Korea
Gold medal – first place	2020 Kuwait
Islamic Solidarity Games
Gold medal – first place	2021 Konya

Anis Zouaoui (born 7 February 1992) is a Qatari handball player for Al Arabi and the Qatari national team.

He participated at the 2017 World Men's Handball Championship.
