= Abdullah Al-Abbas =

Saudi Arabian handball player

Personal information
- Nationality: Saudi Arabian
- Born: 30 January 1992 (age 34)
- Height: 1.65 m (5 ft 5 in)

Sport
- Sport: Handball
- Position: Left wing
- Current club: Al Houda
- Number: 3
National team
Years	Team	Apps	(Gls)
–	Saudi Arabia	59	(205)

Abdullah Al-Abbas (Arabic: عبدالله آل عباس; born 30 January 1992) is a Saudi Arabian handball player for Al Houda and the Saudi Arabia national team.
