= Mohammed Al-Nassfan =

Saudi Arabian handball player

Personal information
- Nationality: Saudi Arabian
- Born: 26 July 1991 (age 35)
- Height: 1.84 m (6 ft 0 in)

Sport
- Sport: Handball
- Position: Goalkeeper
- Current club: Al-Safa
National team
Years	Team	Apps	(Gls)
–	Saudi Arabia	8	(0)

Mohammed Al-Nassfan (Arabic: محمد النسفان; born 26 July 1991) is a Saudi Arabian handball player for Al-Safa and the Saudi Arabian national team.
