= Abdulazez Saeed =

Saudi Arabian handball player

Personal information
- Nationality: Saudi Arabian
- Born: 28 January 1990 (age 36)
- Height: 1.86 m (6 ft 1 in)

Sport
- Sport: Handball
- Position: Right wing
- Current club: Al-Ahli
National team
Years	Team	Apps	(Gls)
–	Saudi Arabia	28	(29)

Abdulazez Saeed (Arabic: عبد العزيز سعيد; born 28 January 1990) is a Saudi Arabian handball player for Al-Ahli and the Saudi Arabian national team.

He participated at the 2017 World Men's Handball Championship.
