= Ali Al-Ibrahim =

Saudi Arabian handball player

Personal information
- Nationality: Saudi Arabian
- Born: 24 April 1997 (age 29)
- Height: 1.81 m (5 ft 11 in)

Sport
- Sport: Handball
- Position: Pivot
- Current club: Khaleej Club
- Number: 3
National team
Years	Team	Apps	(Gls)
–	Saudi Arabia	30	(59)

Ali Al-Ibrahim (Arabic: علي آل إبراهيم; born 24 April 1997) is a Saudi Arabian handball player for Khaleej Club and the Saudi Arabian national team.

He participated at the 2017 World Men's Handball Championship.
