= Moustafa Heiba =

Qatari handball player (born 1996)

Personal information
- Nationality: Qatari
- Born: 17 December 1996 (age 29) Alexandria, Egypt
- Height: 1.84 m (6 ft 0 in)

Sport
- Sport: Handball
- Position: Centre back
- Current club: Al Wakrah
- Number: 88
National team
Years	Team	Apps	(Gls)
–	Qatar	57	(157)
Medal record
Men's handball
Representing Qatar
Asian Championship
Gold medal – first place	2022 Saudi Arabia
Gold medal – first place	2024 Bahrain
Silver medal – second place	2026 Kuwait
Islamic Solidarity Games
Gold medal – first place	2021 Konya

Moustafa Heiba (born 17 December 1996) is a Qatari handball player for Al Wakrah and the Qatari national team.

He represented Qatar at the 2019 World Men's Handball Championship.

He has been designed MVP of the 2024 Asian Championship.
