= Yuto Agarie =

Japanese handball player (born 1993)

Personal information
- Nationality: Japanese
- Born: 6 July 1993 (age 33) Urasoe, Okinawa, Japan
- Height: 1.83 m (6 ft 0 in)

Sport
- Sport: Handball
- Position: Centre back
- Current club: Daido Steel
- Number: 33
National team
Years	Team	Apps	(Gls)
–	Japan	43	(132)
Medal record
Asian Championship
Silver medal – second place	2024 Bahrain
Bronze medal – third place	2020 Kuwait

Yuto Agarie (東江 雄斗, Agarie Yūto; born 6 July 1993) is a Japanese handball player for Daido Steel and the Japanese national team.

He participated at the 2017 World Men's Handball Championship.
