= Abbas Al-Saffar =

Saudi Arabian handball player

Personal information
- Nationality: Saudi Arabian
- Born: 15 January 1994 (age 32)
- Height: 1.82 m (6 ft 0 in)

Sport
- Sport: Handball
- Position: Left back
- Current club: Mudhar
- Number: 99
National team
Years	Team	Apps	(Gls)
2015–	Saudi Arabia	35	(52)
Medal record
Asian Championship
Bronze medal – third place	2022 Saudi Arabia

Abbas Al-Saffar (Arabic: عباس الصفار; born 15 January 1994) is a Saudi Arabian handball player for Mudhar and the Saudi Arabian national team.
