= Mohammed Al-Zaer =

Saudi Arabian handball player

Personal information
- Nationality: Saudi Arabian
- Born: 2 February 1987 (age 39)
- Height: 1.82 m (6 ft 0 in)

Sport
- Sport: Handball
- Position: Pivot
- Current club: Al Safa Club
- Number: 87
National team
Years	Team	Apps	(Gls)
–	Saudi Arabia	79	(180)
Medal record
Asian Championship
Bronze medal – third place	2022 Saudi Arabia

Mohammed Al-Zaer (Arabic: محمد الزير; born 2 February 1987) is a Saudi Arabian handball player for Al Safa Club and the Saudi Arabian national team.
