= Indonesia men's national handball team =

Indonesia

Information
- Association: Indonesia Handball Association

Colours
1st	2nd
- Last updated on Unknown.

The Indonesia national handball team is the national team of Indonesia. It is governed by the Indonesia Handball Association and takes part in international handball competitions.

== Competitive record ==
=== Asian Games ===
- 2018 – 12th place
