= Malaysia men's national handball team =

Malaysia

Information
- Nickname: Harimau Malaya
- Association: Malaysia Handball Association

Colours
1st	2nd
- Last updated on Unknown.

The Malaysia national handball team is governed by the Malaysia Handball Association and takes part in international handball competitions.
