= Abdullah Al-Hammad =

Saudi Arabian handball player

Personal information
- Nationality: Saudi Arabian
- Born: 10 October 1990 (age 36)
- Height: 1.85 m (6 ft 1 in)

Sport
- Sport: Handball
- Position: Left back
- Current club: Al Houda
- Number: 8
National team
Years	Team	Apps	(Gls)
–	Saudi Arabia	94	(116)
Medal record
Asian Championship
Bronze medal – third place	2022 Saudi Arabia

Abdullah Al-Hammad (Arabic: عبدالله آل حماد; born 10 October 1990) is a Saudi Arabian handball player for Al Houda and the Saudi Arabian national team.
