= POPKI Sports Hall =

Multifunction sports arena in Indonesia

- Pusat Olahraga Persahabatan Korea Indonesia
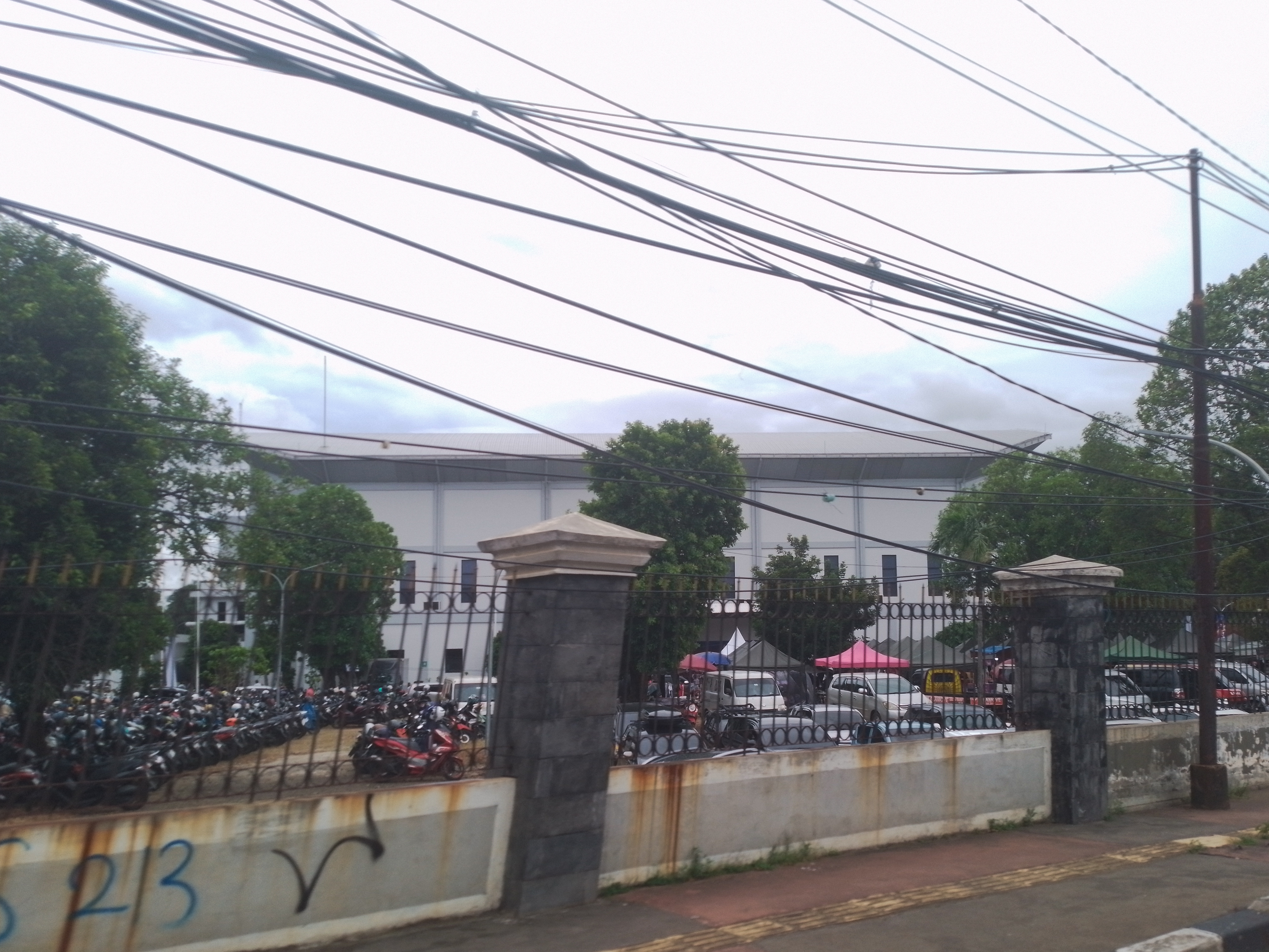
- View from outside the compound
- Interactive map of POPKI Sports Hall
- Location: Cibubur, East Jakarta, Jakarta
- Coordinates: 6.3676934°S 106.88999989999999°E
- Capacity: 5,000
- Public transit: Harjamukti

POPKI Sports Hall (Indonesian: Gelanggang Olahraga POPKI) or commonly known as GOR POPKI a multifunction sports arena in Cibubur, Ciracas, East Jakarta, Jakarta, Indonesia. POPKI itself is an acronym of Pusat Olahraga Persahabatan Korea Indonesia (Korea Indonesia Friendship Sport Center).

The arena hosted futsal and taekwondo events of 2011 SEA Games, and later hosted the handball events of 2018 Asian Games. It also has hosted various basketball, badminton, volleyball, futsal, and taekwondo competitions.
