= Equestrian events at the 2018 Asian Games =

- Venue: Jakarta International Equestrian Park
- Dates: 20–30 August 2018
- Competitors: 122 from 21 nations

Equestrian events at the 2018 Asian Games were held at the Jakarta International Equestrian Park, Jakarta, Indonesia, from 20 to 30 August 2018.

There were three equestrian disciplines: dressage, eventing and jumping. All three disciplines are further divided into individual and team contests for a total of six events.

== Schedule ==
●	Round	●	Last round	Q	Qualification	F	Final

Event↓/Date →	20th Mon	21st Tue	22nd Wed	23rd Thu	24th Fri	25th Sat	26th Sun	27th Mon	28th Tue		29th Wed	30th Thu
Individual dressage	Q	Q		F								
Team dressage	F											
Individual eventing					●	●	●					
Team eventing					●	●	●					
Individual jumping								Q	Q			F
Team jumping								Q	Q	F		

== Medalists ==
Event	Gold	Silver	Bronze
Individual dressage	Jacqueline Siu; Hong Kong	Qabil Ambak; Malaysia	Kim Hyeok; South Korea
Team dressage	Japan; Masanao Takahashi; Shunsuke Terui; Kazuki Sado; Akane Kuroki	South Korea; Kim Chun-pil; Nam Dong-heon; Kim Kyun-sub; Kim Hyeok	Thailand; Arinadtha Chavatanont; Apisada Bannagijsophon; Chalermcharn Yotviriyapanit; Pakjira Thongpakdi
Individual eventing	Yoshiaki Oiwa; Japan	Fouaad Mirza; India	Hua Tian; China
Team eventing	Japan; Takayuki Yumira; Kenta Hiranaga; Ryuzo Kitajima; Yoshiaki Oiwa	India; Rakesh Kumar; Ashish Malik; Jitender Singh; Fouaad Mirza	Thailand; Fuangvich Aniruth-deva; Arinadtha Chavatanont; Preecha Khunjan; Korntawat Samran
Individual jumping	Ali Al-Khorafi; Kuwait	Ali Al-Thani; Qatar	Ramzy Al-Duhami; Saudi Arabia
Team jumping	Saudi Arabia; Abdullah Al-Sharbatly; Khaled Al-Eid; Khaled Al-Mobty; Ramzy Al-Duhami	Japan; Taizo Sugitani; Shota Ogomori; Toshiki Masui; Daisuke Fukushima	Qatar; Hamad Al-Attiyah; Salmen Al-Suwaidi; Ali Al-Thani; Bassem Hassan Mohammed

== Medal table ==
Rank	Nation	Gold	Silver	Bronze	Total
1	Japan (JPN)	3	1	0	4
2	Saudi Arabia (KSA)	1	0	1	2
3	Hong Kong (HKG)	1	0	0	1
3	Kuwait (KUW)	1	0	0	1
5	India (IND)	0	2	0	2
6	Qatar (QAT)	0	1	1	2
6	South Korea (KOR)	0	1	1	2
8	Malaysia (MAS)	0	1	0	1
9	Thailand (THA)	0	0	2	2
10	China (CHN)	0	0	1	1
Totals (10 entries)		6	6	6	18

== Participating nations ==
A total of 122 athletes from 21 nations competed in equestrian events at the 2018 Asian Games:

- Bahrain (4)
- Brunei (1)
- China (5)
- Chinese Taipei (8)
- Hong Kong (8)
- India (7)
- Indonesia (12)
- Iran (6)
- Japan (12)
- Kuwait (4)
- Kyrgyzstan (4)
- Malaysia (3)
- Philippines (3)
- Qatar (7)
- Saudi Arabia (4)
- Singapore (2)
- South Korea (11)
- Syria (2)
- Thailand (11)
- United Arab Emirates (4)
- Uzbekistan (4)
