= Equestrian at the 2018 Asian Games – Individual dressage =

Individual dressage at the 2018 Asian Games
- Venue: Jakarta International Equestrian Park
- Dates: 20–23 August 2018
- Competitors: 27 from 10 nations

Medalists
gold medal	Jacqueline Siu	Hong Kong
silver medal	Qabil Ambak	Malaysia
bronze medal	Kim Hyeok	South Korea

The individual dressage in equestrian at the 2018 Asian Games was held at the Jakarta International Equestrian Park from 20 to 23 August 2018.

== Schedule ==
All times are Western Indonesia Time (UTC+07:00)

Date	Time	Event
Monday, 20 August 2018	08:00	Prix St-Georges
Tuesday, 21 August 2018	08:00	Intermediate I
Thursday, 23 August 2018	08:00	Intermediate I freestyle

== Results ==
Legend

- EL — Eliminated

=== Prix St-Georges ===
Rank	Athlete	Horse	% score
1	Qabil Ambak (MAS)	Rosenstolz	74.881
2	Kim Hyeok (KOR)	Degas K	71.235
3	Jacqueline Siu (HKG)	JC Fuerst on Tour	70.735
4	Masanao Takahashi (JPN)	Fabriano 58	69.823
5	Akane Kuroki (JPN)	Toots	69.675
6	Larasati Gading (INA)	Calaiza T	69.146
7	Shunsuke Terui (JPN)	Alias Max	68.999
8	Gu Bing (CHN)	Donni Brasco	68.852
9	Kazuki Sado (JPN)	Djuice	68.793
10	Kim Kyun-sub (KOR)	Sonn En Schein	68.440
11	Pakjira Thongpakdi (THA)	Hispania 7	68.117
12	Litta Soheila Sohi (IRI)	Air FK	66.646
13	Arinadtha Chavatanont (THA)	Clapton C	66.146
14	Nicole Hang (TPE)	Berlusconi 4	66.117
15	Chalermcharn Yotviriyapanit (THA)	Jazz Royal 2	65.882
16	Huang Zhuoqin (CHN)	Domani	65.764
17	Dara Ninggar Prameswari (INA)	Commodore	65.734
18	Nam Dong-heon (KOR)	Release	65.646
19	Alla Poloumieva (SGP)	Dornkaart	65.146
20	Kim Chun-pil (KOR)	Dr. Watson 8	64.940
20	Njoto Dewi Kunti Setiowati (INA)	Diamond Boy 8	64.940
22	Roshni Ranjani Pannirselvam (SGP)	Dancing Boy 20	64.382
23	Chiu Yu-chi (TPE)	Ziroco	64.293
24	Nadya Zax (INA)	Bique-Bique Cedros	63.175
25	Apisada Bannagijsophon (THA)	Samba de Orfeu	62.911
26	Lin Chi-chun (TPE)	Urban legend	61.617
—	Chang Yu-chieh (TPE)	Alatrichta	EL

=== Intermediate I ===
Rank	Athlete	Horse	% score
1	Qabil Ambak (MAS)	Rosenstolz	73.499
2	Jacqueline Siu (HKG)	JC Fuerst on Tour	71.970
3	Kim Hyeok (KOR)	Degas K	71.558
4	Masanao Takahashi (JPN)	Fabriano 58	70.558
5	Shunsuke Terui (JPN)	Alias Max	69.411
6	Kim Kyun-sub (KOR)	Sonn En Schein	68.676
7	Pakjira Thongpakdi (THA)	Hispania 7	68.234
8	Nam Dong-heon (KOR)	Release	68.088
9	Litta Soheila Sohi (IRI)	Air FK	67.264
10	Larasati Gading (INA)	Calaiza T	66.793
11	Kazuki Sado (JPN)	Djuice	66.764
12	Arinadtha Chavatanont (THA)	Clapton C	66.646
13	Nicole Hang (TPE)	Berlusconi 4	66.205
14	Kim Chun-pil (KOR)	Dr. Watson 8	66.087
15	Gu Bing (CHN)	Donni Brasco	65.764
16	Akane Kuroki (JPN)	Toots	65.470
17	Dara Ninggar Prameswari (INA)	Commodore	65.264
18	Apisada Bannagijsophon (THA)	Samba de Orfeu	65.235
19	Chalermcharn Yotviriyapanit (THA)	Jazz Royal 2	65.234
20	Huang Zhuoqin (CHN)	Domani	64.440
21	Chiu Yu-chi (TPE)	Ziroco	64.382
22	Lin Chi-chun (TPE)	Urban legend	63.705
23	Roshni Ranjani Pannirselvam (SGP)	Dancing Boy 20	62.764
24	Alla Poloumieva (SGP)	Dornkaart	61.499
25	Njoto Dewi Kunti Setiowati (INA)	Diamond Boy 8	60.970
26	Nadya Zax (INA)	Bique-Bique Cedros	60.617

=== Intermediate I freestyle ===
Rank	Athlete	Horse	% score
1st place, gold medalist(s)	Jacqueline Siu (HKG)	JC Fuerst on Tour	77.045
2nd place, silver medalist(s)	Qabil Ambak (MAS)	Rosenstolz	76.620
3rd place, bronze medalist(s)	Kim Hyeok (KOR)	Degas K	75.705
4	Shunsuke Terui (JPN)	Alias Max	74.735
5	Pakjira Thongpakdi (THA)	Hispania 7	72.650
6	Litta Soheila Sohi (IRI)	Air FK	71.775
7	Arinadtha Chavatanont (THA)	Clapton C	70.240
8	Kim Kyun-sub (KOR)	Sonn En Schein	69.435
9	Masanao Takahashi (JPN)	Fabriano 58	69.195
10	Dara Ninggar Prameswari (INA)	Commodore	67.925
11	Larasati Gading (INA)	Calaiza T	66.715
12	Gu Bing (CHN)	Donni Brasco	66.670
13	Chiu Yu-chi (TPE)	Ziroco	66.655
14	Huang Zhuoqin (CHN)	Domani	66.500
15	Nicole Hang (TPE)	Berlusconi 4	66.210
