= Equestrian at the 2018 Asian Games – Individual eventing =

Individual eventing at the 2018 Asian Games
- Venue: Jakarta International Equestrian Park
- Dates: 24–26 August 2018
- Competitors: 31 from 9 nations

Medalists
gold medal	Yoshiaki Oiwa	Japan
silver medal	Fouaad Mirza	India
bronze medal	Hua Tian	China

The individual eventing in equestrian at the 2018 Asian Games was held at the Jakarta International Equestrian Park from 24 to 26 August 2018.

== Schedule ==
All times are Western Indonesia Time (UTC+07:00)

Date	Time	Event
Friday, 24 August 2018	08:00	Dressage
Saturday, 25 August 2018	07:00	Cross-country
Sunday, 26 August 2018	13:00	Jumping

== Results ==
Legend

- EL — Eliminated
- WD — Withdrawn

Rank	Athlete	Horse	Dressage	Cross-country			Jumping			Total
Rank	Athlete	Horse	Dressage	Jump	Time	Total	Jump	Time	Total	Total
1st place, gold medalist(s)	Yoshiaki Oiwa (JPN)	Bart L JRA	22.70			0.00			0.00	22.70
2nd place, silver medalist(s)	Fouaad Mirza (IND)	Seigneur Medicott	22.40			0.00	4		4.00	26.40
3rd place, bronze medalist(s)	Hua Tian (CHN)	PSH Convivial	27.10			0.00			0.00	27.10
4	Ryuzo Kitajima (JPN)	Koko Doro	29.60			0.00			0.00	29.60
5	Takayuki Yumira (JPN)	Poacher's Hope	30.10			0.00			0.00	30.10
6	Liang Ruiji (CHN)	Agora de Bordenave	32.80			0.00			0.00	32.80
7	Kenta Hiranaga (JPN)	Delago	29.10			0.00	4		4.00	33.10
8	Song Sang-wuk (KOR)	Carl M	34.00			0.00			0.00	34.00
9	Korntawat Samran (THA)	APH Sparky	31.70			0.00	4		4.00	35.70
10	Rakesh Kumar (IND)	Veni Vedi Vici	35.40		0.40	0.40	4		4.00	39.80
11	Arinadtha Chavatanont (THA)	Boleybawn Prince	41.70			0.00			0.00	41.70
12	Annie Ho (HKG)	JC Fleurelle	31.60		11.20	11.20			0.00	42.80
13	Jendry Palandeng (INA)	Donitri	36.60		3.60	3.60	4		4.00	44.20
14	Ali Al-Marri (QAT)	Fernhill Friendly Touch	32.00		13.20	13.20			0.00	45.20
15	Preecha Khunjan (THA)	Snowrunner	33.30			0.00	16		16.00	49.30
16	Ashish Malik (IND)	Frimeur du Record CH	35.10	20		20.00			0.00	55.10
17	Nicole Fardel (HKG)	Vihara du Causse	34.10	20	3.20	23.20			0.00	57.30
18	Hong Won-jae (KOR)	Creator GS	34.20	20	13.60	33.60	8		8.00	75.80
19	Saeed Al-Rashdi (QAT)	Graffiti de Lully CH	35.30	20	11.60	31.60	12		12.00	78.90
20	Jitender Singh (IND)	Dalakhani du Routy	28.80	40	15.20	55.20	8		8.00	92.00
—	Su Yu Xuan (HKG)	Diva de Lux	33.00		2.40	2.40			WD	WD
—	Steven Menayang (INA)	Riga	34.50	20	5.60	25.60			WD	WD
—	Kim Sung-soo (KOR)	Nexxus	31.30	40	9.20	49.20			WD	WD
—	Toufan Torabi (IRI)	Waitangi Amazon	33.20			EL				EL
—	Riko Ganda Febryyanto (INA)	Lelis Blanch	40.40			EL				EL
—	Qiaolun Bate (CHN)	Up de la Grange	29.20			EL				EL
—	Patrick Lam (HKG)	JC Weronique	30.00			EL				EL
—	Kim Seok (KOR)	Cloud Nine 4	30.20			EL				EL
—	Alfaro Menayang (INA)	All Right	33.70			EL				EL
—	Hassan Al-Naimi (QAT)	Santa Cruz III	32.90			EL				EL
—	Fuangvich Aniruth-deva (THA)	Bingo S	32.70			WD				WD
