= Equestrian at the 2018 Asian Games – Individual jumping =

Individual jumping at the 2018 Asian Games
- Venue: Jakarta International Equestrian Park
- Date: 27–30 August 2018
- Competitors: 68 from 19 nations

Medalists
gold medal	Ali Al-Khorafi	Kuwait
silver medal	Ali Al-Thani	Qatar
bronze medal	Ramzy Al-Duhami	Saudi Arabia

Individual jumping equestrian at the 2018 Asian Games was held in Jakarta International Equestrian Park, Jakarta, from 27 to 30 August 2018. This event had been held since equestrian made its debut at the Asian Games in 1982 New Delhi. Japan won a record three gold medals in this event ahead of Saudi Arabia with two gold medals, Kuwait, Philippines, and Qatar with one gold respectively.

== Schedule ==
All times are Western Indonesia Time (UTC+07:00)

Date	Time	Event
Monday, 27 August 2018	08:00	1st qualification
Tuesday, 28 August 2018	08:00	Qualifier 1
Tuesday, 28 August 2018	14:00	Qualifier 2
Thursday, 30 August 2018	08:00	Final round 1
Thursday, 30 August 2018	15:00	Final round 2

== Results ==
Legend

- EL — Eliminated
- RT — Retired
- WD — Withdrawn

=== Qualification ===
Rank	Athlete	Horse	1st qualification			Qualifier 1			Total
Rank	Athlete	Horse	Jump	Time	Total	Jump	Time	Total	Total
1	Ramzy Al-Duhami (KSA)	Ted	0	70.14	0.00	0	0	0	0.00
2	Khaled Al-Mobty (KSA)	Desert Storm II	0	70.93	0.40	0	0	0	0.40
3	Ali Al-Thani (QAT)	Sirocco	0	72.18	1.02	0	0	0	1.02
4	Ali Al-Khorafi (KUW)	Cheril	4	72.25	1.06	0	0	0	1.06
5	Taizo Sugitani (JPN)	Heroine de Muze	0	75.15	2.51	0	0	0	2.51
6	Shota Ogomori (JPN)	Sig Iron Man	4	76.35	3.11	0	0	0	3.11
7	Hamad Al-Kirbi (UAE)	Quel Caadan Z	4	78.05	3.96	0	0	0	3.96
8	Kim Seok (KOR)	Lacord	0	78.50	4.18	0	0	0	4.18
9	Wong I-sheau (TPE)	Zadarijke V	4	78.76	4.31	0	0	0	4.31
10	Jasmine Chen (TPE)	Ninyon	0	80.94	5.40	0	0	0	5.40
11	Khaled Al-Eid (KSA)	Kayenne of de Rocky Mounten	0	73.14	1.50	4	0	4	5.50
12	Daisuke Fukushima (JPN)	Cornet 36	0	80.38	5.12	0	1	1	6.12
13	Bassem Hassan Mohammed (QAT)	Argelith Squid	0	75.82	2.84	4	0	4	6.84
14	Latifa Al-Maktoum (UAE)	Cobolt 8	4	76.08	2.97	4	0	4	6.97
15	Noora Al-Qaoud (KUW)	Annalita	4	84.53	7.20	0	0	0	7.20
16	Ahmad Hamcho (SYR)	Cartagena 17	0	76.73	3.30	4	0	4	7.30
17	Toni Leviste (PHI)	Maximillian	0	85.14	7.50	0	1	1	8.50
18	Hamad Al-Attiyah (QAT)	Clinton	4	79.41	4.64	4	0	4	8.64
19	Qabil Ambak (MAS)	3Q Qalisya	0	82.48	6.17	4	0	4	10.17
20	Clarissa Lyra (HKG)	Catokia 2	8	88.74	9.30	0	1	1	10.30
21	Nadia Taryam (UAE)	Cortado	0	81.00	5.43	4	2	6	11.43
22	Oh Sung-hwan (KOR)	Chintan	4	83.41	6.64	4	1	5	11.64
23	Ferry Wahyu Hadiyanto (INA)	Faults Free	4	94.27	12.07	0	0	0	12.07
24	Mohamed Al-Remeithi (UAE)	Denitha	0	87.85	8.86	4	0	4	12.86
25	Toshiki Masui (JPN)	Carthagena 6	0	80.65	5.26	8	0	8	13.26
26	Joker Arroyo (PHI)	Ubama Alia	0	81.18	5.52	8	0	8	13.52
27	Sohn Bong-gak (KOR)	Lex' Stakkaro	0	81.27	5.57	8	0	8	13.57
28	Neelan Jonathan Ratnasingham (MAS)	Connely 2	0	95.83	12.85	0	1	1	13.85
29	Jacqueline Lai (HKG)	Basta	0	74.00	1.93	12	0	12	13.93
30	Hsieh Ping-yang (TPE)	Just Energie	0	80.15	5.01	8	1	9	14.01
31	Patrick Lam (HKG)	Quintino 9	0	82.72	6.29	8	0	8	14.29
32	Okiljon Sobirjonov (UZB)	Camira	4	82.93	6.40	8	0	8	14.40
33	Sayed Adnan Al-Alawi (BRN)	Baluu	4	88.51	9.19	4	2	6	15.19
34	Davoud Pourrezaei (IRI)	Veneurdisigny	4	93.41	11.64	4	0	4	15.64
35	Raena Leung (HKG)	Orphee du Granit	4	86.45	8.16	8	0	8	16.16
36	Talal Al-Zahem (KUW)	Cannonball du Toultia Z	0	88.68	9.27	4	3	7	16.27
37	Nurjan Tuyakbaev (UZB)	King Cornet L	4	88.13	9.00	8	1	9	18.00
38	Lu Ting-hsuan (TPE)	Le Point Koe	4	90.35	10.11	8	0	8	18.11
39	Rinat Galimov (KGZ)	Dukato M	12	91.54	10.70	8	0	8	18.70
40	Salmen Al-Suwaidi (QAT)	Cantaro 32	8	81.92	5.89	12	1	13	18.89
41	Hasan Al-Khalifa (BRN)	AW Vivika	12	93.69	11.78	8	0	8	19.78
41	Kurniadi Mustopo (INA)	Capri's Pearl	4	91.69	10.78	8	1	9	19.78
43	Farhang Sadeghi (IRI)	Quick 'n' Step	8	95.62	12.74	8	0	8	20.74
44	Zahan Setalvad (IND)	Quintus Z	16	101.37	15.62	4	2	6	21.62
45	Dalia Al-Zahem (KUW)	Richebourg du Jusclay	8	94.79	12.33	8	2	10	22.33
46	Sharmini Ratnasingham (MAS)	Arcado L	4	96.19	13.03	8	2	10	23.03
47	Kamil Sabitov (KGZ)	Quintendro	8	83.87	6.87	16	1	17	23.87
48	Andrei Shalohin (KGZ)	Carmen	4	86.90	8.38	16	1	17	25.38
49	Kaevaan Setalvad (IND)	Cherokee	8	95.89	12.88	12	1	13	25.88
50	Lee Yo-seb (KOR)	Quitefire	8	96.15	13.01	12	1	13	26.01
51	Olga Sorokina (KGZ)	Corina	24	99.50	14.68	12	0	12	26.68
52	Masoud Mokarinejad (IRI)	Cyrano D'Orbri	8	92.66	11.26	16	1	17	28.26
53	Alex Davis (THA)	Dibria	16	102.45	16.16	12	1	13	29.16
54	Gayrat Nazarov (UZB)	Quatro Junior	8	98.16	14.01	16	1	17	31.01
55	Sailub Lertratanachai (THA)	Cagena Z	12	96.93	13.40	16	2	18	31.40
56	Mohamad Joubarani (SYR)	Etos HBC	8	117.84	23.85	12	1	13	36.85
57	Khaled Al-Khatri (BRN)	Sierra		EL	43.85	4	0	4	47.85
58	Pg Mohd Nasir (BRU)	Ivory de Roulard	12	108.29	19.08	28	1	29	48.08
59	Ariana Ravanbakhsh (IRI)	S I E C Cros		EL	43.85	8	0	8	51.85
60	Raymen Kaunang (INA)	Conquistador		EL	43.85	12	1	13	56.85
61	Yanyan Hadiansah (INA)	Bodius	20	112.91	21.39	36	0	36	57.39
—	Ahmed Maki (BRN)	Consuela van Verst		EL	43.85			EL	EL
—	Chiara Amor (PHI)	Devonport 2	16	114.67	22.27			EL	EL
—	Chetan Reddy Nukala (IND)	Elco VM		EL	43.85			EL	EL
—	Umidjon Komilov (UZB)	Udgi Girl des Gy	0	79.42	4.64			EL	EL
—	Abdullah Al-Sharbatly (KSA)	Carrera	0	78.51	4.19			EL	EL
—	Siengsaw Lertratanachai (THA)	Courville L	8	96.78	13.32			RT	RT
—	Jaruporn Limpichati (THA)	Irregular Choice		EL	43.85			WD	WD

=== Qualifier 2 ===
Rank	Athlete	Horse	Prev. rounds	Penalties			Total
Rank	Athlete	Horse	Prev. rounds	Jump	Time	Total	Total
1	Ramzy Al-Duhami (KSA)	Ted	0.00	0	1	1	1.00
2	Ali Al-Thani (QAT)	Sirocco	1.02	0	0	0	1.02
3	Ali Al-Khorafi (KUW)	Cheril	1.06	0	0	0	1.06
4	Taizo Sugitani (JPN)	Heroine de Muze	2.51	0	0	0	2.51
5	Shota Ogomori (JPN)	Sig Iron Man	3.11	0	0	0	3.11
6	Hamad Al-Kirbi (UAE)	Quel Caadan Z	3.96	0	0	0	3.96
7	Khaled Al-Mobty (KSA)	Desert Storm II	0.40	4	0	4	4.40
8	Khaled Al-Eid (KSA)	Kayenne of de Rocky Mounten	5.50	0	0	0	5.50
9	Bassem Hassan Mohammed (QAT)	Argelith Squid	6.84	0	0	0	6.84
10	Daisuke Fukushima (JPN)	Cornet 36	6.12	0	1	1	7.12
11	Noora Al-Qaoud (KUW)	Annalita	7.20	0	0	0	7.20
12	Ahmad Hamcho (SYR)	Cartagena 17	7.30	0	0	0	7.30
13	Kim Seok (KOR)	Lacord	4.18	4	0	4	8.18
14	Wong I-sheau (TPE)	Zadarijke V	4.31	4	0	4	8.31
15	Toni Leviste (PHI)	Maximillian	8.50	0	0	0	8.50
16	Jasmine Chen (TPE)	Ninyon	5.40	4	0	4	9.40
17	Latifa Al-Maktoum (UAE)	Cobolt	6.97	4	0	4	10.97
18	Qabil Ambak (MAS)	3Q Qalisya	10.17	0	1	1	11.17
19	Ferry Wahyu Hadiyanto (INA)	Faults Free	12.07	0	0	0	12.07
20	Hamad Al-Attiyah (QAT)	Clinton	8.64	4	0	4	12.64
21	Clarissa Lyra (HKG)	Catokia 2	10.30	4	1	5	15.30
22	Nadia Taryam (UAE)	Cortado	11.43	4	0	4	15.43
23	Raena Leung (HKG)	Orphee du Granit	16.16	0	0	0	16.16
24	Mohamed Al-Remeithi (UAE)	Denitha	12.86	4	0	4	16.86
25	Talal Al-Zahem (KUW)	Cannonball du Toultia Z	16.27	0	1	1	17.27
26	Hsieh Ping-yang (TPE)	Just Energie	14.01	4	0	4	18.01
27	Joker Arroyo (PHI)	Ubama Alia	13.52	8	0	8	21.52
28	Jacqueline Lai (HKG)	Basta	13.93	8	0	8	21.93
29	Toshiki Masui (JPN)	Carthagena 6	13.26	8	1	9	22.26
30	Davoud Pourrezaei (IRI)	Veneurdisigny	15.64	8	0	8	23.64
30	Oh Sung-hwan (KOR)	Chintan	11.64	12	0	12	23.64
32	Sohn Bong-gak (KOR)	Lex' Stakkaro	13.57	8	4	12	25.57
33	Dalia Al-Zahem (KUW)	Richebourg du Jusclay	22.33	4	0	4	26.33
34	Neelan Jonathan Ratnasingham (MAS)	Connely 2	13.85	12	1	13	26.85
35	Patrick Lam (HKG)	Quintino 9	14.29	12	1	13	27.29
36	Okiljon Sobirjonov (UZB)	Camira	14.40	12	1	13	27.40
37	Zahan Setalvad (IND)	Quintus Z	21.62	4	2	6	27.62
38	Kurniadi Mustopo (INA)	Capri's Pearl	19.78	8	0	8	27.78
39	Sharmini Ratnasingham (MAS)	Arcado L	23.03	4	1	5	28.03
40	Salmen Al-Suwaidi (QAT)	Cantaro 32	18.89	8	3	11	29.89
41	Sayed Adnan Al-Alawi (BRN)	Baluu	15.19	12	3	15	30.19
42	Rinat Galimov (KGZ)	Dukato M	18.70	12	0	12	30.70
43	Hasan Al-Khalifa (BRN)	AW Vivika	19.78	12	0	12	31.78
44	Kaevaan Setalvad (IND)	Cherokee	25.88	12	1	13	38.88
45	Nurjan Tuyakbaev (UZB)	King Cornet L	18.00	16	6	22	40.00
46	Farhang Sadeghi (IRI)	Quick 'n' Step	20.74	20	0	20	40.74
—	Lu Ting-hsuan (TPE)	Le Point Koe	18.11			EL	EL
—	Kamil Sabitov (KGZ)	Quintendro	23.87			RT	RT
—	Lee Yo-seb (KOR)	Quitefire	26.01			RT	RT
—	Andrei Shalohin (KGZ)	Carmen	25.38			WD	WD

=== Final round 1 ===
Rank	Athlete	Horse	Prev. rounds	Penalties			Total
Rank	Athlete	Horse	Prev. rounds	Jump	Time	Total	Total
1	Ramzy Al-Duhami (KSA)	Ted	1.00	0	0	0	1.00
2	Ali Al-Khorafi (KUW)	Cheril	1.06	0	0	0	1.06
3	Ali Al-Thani (QAT)	Sirocco	1.02	0	1	1	2.02
4	Hamad Al-Kirbi (UAE)	Quel Caadan Z	3.96	0	0	0	3.96
5	Taizo Sugitani (JPN)	Heroine de Muze	2.51	4	0	4	6.51
6	Shota Ogomori (JPN)	Sig Iron Man	3.11	4	0	4	7.11
7	Daisuke Fukushima (JPN)	Cornet 36	7.12	0	0	0	7.12
8	Khaled Al-Mobty (KSA)	Desert Storm II	4.40	4	1	5	9.40
9	Latifa Al-Maktoum (UAE)	Cobolt	10.97	0	0	0	10.97
10	Jasmine Chen (TPE)	Ninyon	9.40	4	0	4	13.40
11	Khaled Al-Eid (KSA)	Kayenne of de Rocky Mounten	5.50	8	0	8	13.50
12	Clarissa Lyra (HKG)	Catokia 2	15.30	0	0	0	15.30
12	Ahmad Hamcho (SYR)	Cartagena 17	7.30	8	0	8	15.30
14	Qabil Ambak (MAS)	3Q Qalisya	11.17	4	1	5	16.17
15	Toni Leviste (PHI)	Maximillian	8.50	8	0	8	16.50
16	Noora Al-Qaoud (KUW)	Annalita	7.20	8	2	10	17.20
17	Kim Seok (KOR)	Lacord	8.18	8	2	10	18.18
18	Nadia Taryam (UAE)	Cortado	15.43	4	1	5	20.43
19	Joker Arroyo (PHI)	Ubama Alia	21.52	0	0	0	21.52
20	Raena Leung (HKG)	Orphee du Granit	16.16	8	0	8	24.16
21	Wong I-sheau (TPE)	Zadarijke V	8.31	16	1	17	25.31
22	Jacqueline Lai (HKG)	Basta	21.93	4	0	4	25.93
23	Hsieh Ping-yang (TPE)	Just Energie	18.01	12	0	12	30.01
24	Ferry Wahyu Hadiyanto (INA)	Faults Free	12.07	20	2	22	34.07
25	Talal Al-Zahem (KUW)	Cannonball du Toultia Z	17.27	16	2	18	35.27
26	Davoud Pourrezaei (IRI)	Veneurdisigny	23.64	12	0	12	35.64
27	Rinat Galimov (KGZ)	Dukato M	30.70	4	1	5	35.70
28	Hasan Al-Khalifa (BRN)	AW Vivika	31.78	4	0	4	35.78
29	Neelan Jonathan Ratnasingham (MAS)	Connely 2	26.85	8	2	10	36.85
30	Zahan Setalvad (IND)	Quintus Z	27.62	8	2	10	37.62
31	Sohn Bong-gak (KOR)	Lex' Stakkaro	25.57	8	5	13	38.57
32	Sayed Adnan Al-Alawi (BRN)	Baluu	30.19	8	1	9	39.19
33	Okiljon Sobirjonov (UZB)	Camira	27.40	12	0	12	39.40
34	Oh Sung-hwan (KOR)	Chintan	23.64	12	7	19	42.64
35	Kurniadi Mustopo (INA)	Capri's Pearl	27.78	16	3	19	46.78
36	Kaevaan Setalvad (IND)	Cherokee	38.88	8	5	13	51.88
37	Nurjan Tuyakbaev (UZB)	King Cornet L	40.00	16	2	18	58.00
—	Sharmini Ratnasingham (MAS)	Arcado L	28.03			EL	EL
—	Bassem Hassan Mohammed (QAT)	Argelith Squid	6.84			EL	EL
—	Hamad Al-Attiyah (QAT)	Clinton	12.64			RT	RT

=== Final round 2 ===
Rank	Athlete	Horse	Prev. rounds	Penalties			Total
Rank	Athlete	Horse	Prev. rounds	Jump	Time	Total	Total
1st place, gold medalist(s)	Ali Al-Khorafi (KUW)	Cheril	1.06	0	0	0	1.06
2nd place, silver medalist(s)	Ali Al-Thani (QAT)	Sirocco	2.02	0	0	0	2.02
3rd place, bronze medalist(s)	Ramzy Al-Duhami (KSA)	Ted	1.00	4	0	0	5.00
4	Taizo Sugitani (JPN)	Heroine de Muze	6.51	0	0	0	6.51
5	Shota Ogomori (JPN)	Sig Iron Man	7.11	0	0	0	7.11
6	Hamad Al-Kirbi (UAE)	Quel Caadan Z	3.96	4	0	4	7.96
7	Latifa Al-Maktoum (UAE)	Cobolt	10.97	0	0	0	10.97
8	Khaled Al-Mobty (KSA)	Desert Storm II	9.40	4	2	6	15.40
9	Clarissa Lyra (HKG)	Catokia 2	15.30	0	1	1	16.30
9	Ahmad Hamcho (SYR)	Cartagena 17	15.30	0	1	1	16.30
11	Toni Leviste (PHI)	Maximillian	16.50	0	0	0	16.50
12	Jasmine Chen (TPE)	Ninyon	13.40	4	0	4	17.40
13	Qabil Ambak (MAS)	3Q Qalisya	16.17	4	1	5	21.17
14	Kim Seok (KOR)	Lacord	18.18	4	0	4	22.18
15	Raena Leung (HKG)	Orphee du Granit	24.16	0	0	0	24.16
16	Noora Al-Qaoud (KUW)	Annalita	17.20	8	5	13	30.20
17	Joker Arroyo (PHI)	Ubama Alia	21.52	8	1	9	30.52
18	Hsieh Ping-yang (TPE)	Just Energie	30.01	8	1	9	39.01
19	Ferry Wahyu Hadiyanto (INA)	Faults Free	34.07	8	1	9	43.07
20	Davoud Pourrezaei (IRI)	Veneurdisigny	35.64	8	0	8	43.64
21	Neelan Jonathan Ratnasingham (MAS)	Connely 2	36.85	4	3	7	43.85
22	Rinat Galimov (KGZ)	Dukato M	35.70	12	1	13	48.70
23	Hasan Al-Khalifa (BRN)	AW Vivika	35.78	24	4	28	63.78
—	Zahan Setalvad (IND)	Quintus Z	37.62			EL	EL
—	Sohn Bong-gak (KOR)	Lex' Stakkaro	38.57			RT	RT
