= Equestrian at the 2018 Asian Games – Team dressage =

Team dressage at the 2018 Asian Games
- Venue: Jakarta International Equestrian Park
- Dates: 20 August 2018
- Competitors: 20 from 5 nations

Medalists
gold medal	Japan; Masanao Takahashi, Shunsuke Terui, Kazuki Sado, Akane Kuroki
silver medal	South Korea; Kim Chun-pil, Nam Dong-heon, Kim Kyun-sub, Kim Hyeok
bronze medal	Thailand; Arinadtha Chavatanont, Apisada Bannagijsophon, Chalermcharn Yotviriyapanit, Pakjira Thongpakdi

The team dressage in equestrian at the 2018 Asian Games was held at the Jakarta International Equestrian Park on 20 August 2018.

== Schedule ==
All times are Western Indonesia Time (UTC+07:00)

Date	Time	Event
Monday, 20 August 2018	08:00	Prix St-Georges

== Results ==
Legend

- EL — Eliminated

Rank	Team	% score
1st place, gold medalist(s)	Japan (JPN)	69.499
	Masanao Takahashi on Fabriano 58	69.823
	Shunsuke Terui on Alias Max	68.999
	Kazuki Sado on Djuice	~~68.793~~
	Akane Kuroki on Toots	69.675
2nd place, silver medalist(s)	South Korea (KOR)	68.440
	Kim Chun-pil on Dr. Watson 8	~~64.940~~
	Nam Dong-heon on Release	65.646
	Kim Kyun-sub on Sonn En Schein	68.440
	Kim Hyeok on Degas K	71.235
3rd place, bronze medalist(s)	Thailand (THA)	66.715
	Arinadtha Chavatanont on Clapton C	66.146
	Apisada Bannagijsophon on Samba de Orfeu	~~62.911~~
	Chalermcharn Yotviriyapanit on Jazz Royal 2	65.882
	Pakjira Thongpakdi on Hispania 7	68.117
4	Indonesia (INA)	66.606
	Njoto Dewi Kunti Setiowati on Diamond Boy 8	64.940
	Dara Ninggar Prameswari on Commodore	65.734
	Nadya Zax on Bique-Bique Cedros	~~63.175~~
	Larasati Gading on Calaiza T	69.146
5	Chinese Taipei (TPE)	64.009
	Chiu Yu-chi on Ziroco	64.293
	Lin Chi-chun on Urban legend	61.617
	Nicole Hang on Berlusconi 4	66.117
	Chang Yu-chieh on Alatrichta	~~EL~~
