= Equestrian at the 2018 Asian Games – Team eventing =

Team eventing at the 2018 Asian Games
- Venue: Jakarta International Equestrian Park
- Dates: 24–26 August 2018
- Competitors: 30 from 8 nations

Medalists
gold medal	Japan; Takayuki Yumira, Kenta Hiranaga, Ryuzo Kitajima, Yoshiaki Oiwa
silver medal	India; Rakesh Kumar, Ashish Malik, Jitender Singh, Fouaad Mirza
bronze medal	Thailand; Fuangvich Aniruth-deva, Arinadtha Chavatanont, Preecha Khunjan, Korntawat Samran

The team eventing in equestrian at the 2018 Asian Games was held at the Jakarta International Equestrian Park from 24 to 26 August 2018.

The Japanese team of Yoshiaki Oiwa, Ryuzo Kitajima, Takayuki Yumira and Kenta Hiranaga won the gold medal. India won the silver medal and Thailand took bronze.

The team and individual eventing competitions used the same scores. Eventing consisted of a dressage test, a cross-country test, and a jumping test. The jumping test had two rounds, with only the first used for the team competition. Team eventing final scores were the sum of the three best overall individual scores (adding the three components) from the four-pair teams.

== Schedule ==
All times are Western Indonesia Time (UTC+07:00)

Date	Time	Event
Friday, 24 August 2018	08:00	Dressage
Saturday, 25 August 2018	07:00	Cross-country
Sunday, 26 August 2018	13:00	Jumping

== Results ==
Legend

- EL — Eliminated
- WD — Withdrawn

Rank	Team	Penalties			Total
Rank	Team	Dressage	X-country	Jumping	Total
1st place, gold medalist(s)	Japan (JPN)	82.40	0.00	0.00	82.40
	Takayuki Yumira on Poacher's Hope	30.10	0.00	0.00	30.10
	Kenta Hiranaga on Delago	~~29.10~~	~~0.00~~	~~4.00~~	~~33.10~~
	Ryuzo Kitajima on Koko Doro	29.60	0.00	0.00	29.60
	Yoshiaki Oiwa on Bart L JRA	22.70	0.00	0.00	22.70
2nd place, silver medalist(s)	India (IND)	92.90	20.40	8.00	121.30
	Rakesh Kumar on Veni Vedi Vici	35.40	0.40	4.00	39.80
	Ashish Malik on Frimeur du Record CH	35.10	20.00	0.00	55.10
	Jitender Singh on Dalakhani du Routy	~~28.80~~	~~55.20~~	~~8.00~~	~~92.00~~
	Fouaad Mirza on Seigneur Medicott	22.40	0.00	4.00	26.40
3rd place, bronze medalist(s)	Thailand (THA)	106.70	0.00	20.00	126.70
	Fuangvich Aniruth-deva on Bingo S	~~32.70~~	~~WD~~		~~1000.00~~
	Arinadtha Chavatanont on Boleybawn Prince	41.70	0.00	0.00	41.70
	Preecha Khunjan on Snowrunner	33.30	0.00	16.00	49.30
	Korntawat Samran on APH Sparky	31.70	0.00	4.00	35.70
4	China (CHN)	89.10	970.80	0.00	1059.90
	Liang Ruiji on Agora de Bordenave	32.80	0.00	0.00	32.80
	Qiaolun Bate on Up de la Grange	29.20	EL		1000.00
	Hua Tian on PSH Convivial	27.10	0.00	0.00	27.10
5	Hong Kong (HKG)	98.70	36.80	964.60	1100.10
	Su Yu Xuan on Diva de Lux	33.00	2.40	WD	1000.00
	Nicole Fardel on Vihara du Causse	34.10	23.20	0.00	57.30
	Patrick Lam on JC Weronique	~~30.00~~	~~EL~~		~~1000.00~~
	Annie Ho on JC Fleurelle	31.60	11.20	0.00	42.80
6	South Korea (KOR)	99.50	82.80	927.50	1109.80
	Song Sang-wuk on Carl M	34.00	0.00	0.00	34.00
	Hong Won-jae on Creator GS	34.20	33.60	8.00	75.80
	Kim Sung-soo on Nexxus	31.30	49.20	WD	1000.00
	Kim Seok on Cloud Nine 4	~~30.20~~	~~EL~~		~~1000.00~~
7	Qatar (QAT)	100.20	1011.90	12.00	1124.10
	Ali Al-Marri on Fernhill Friendly Touch	32.00	13.20	0.00	45.20
	Hassan Al-Naimi on Santa Cruz III	32.90	EL		1000.00
	Saeed Al-Rashdi on Graffiti de Lully CH	35.30	31.60	12.00	78.90
8	Indonesia (INA)	111.50	988.80	943.90	2044.20
	Riko Ganda Febryyanto on Lelis Blanch	40.40	EL		1000.00
	Alfaro Menayang on All Right	~~33.70~~	~~EL~~		~~1000.00~~
	Jendry Palandeng on Donitri	36.60	3.60	4.00	44.20
	Steven Menayang on Riga	34.50	25.60	WD	1000.00
