= Equestrian at the 2018 Asian Games – Team jumping =

Team jumping at the 2018 Asian Games
- Venue: Jakarta International Equestrian Park
- Date: 27–28 August 2018
- Competitors: 65 from 17 nations

Medalists
gold medal	Saudi Arabia; Abdullah Al-Sharbatly, Khaled Al-Eid, Khaled Al-Mobty, Ramzy Al-Duhami
silver medal	Japan; Taizo Sugitani, Shota Ogomori, Toshiki Masui, Daisuke Fukushima
bronze medal	Qatar; Hamad Al-Attiyah, Salmen Al-Suwaidi, Ali Al-Thani, Bassem Hassan Mohammed

Team jumping equestrian at the 2018 Asian Games was held in Jakarta International Equestrian Park, Jakarta, Indonesia on 27 and 28 August 2018. This was the eighth appearance of this event since its debut at the Asian Games in 1986 in Seoul. Japan has won a record of 4 gold medals, followed by Saudi Arabia with 2 gold medals, and Qatar with one gold medal.

Saudi Arabia team won the gold medal, followed by Japan and Qatar who claimed the silver and bronze medals respectively.

== Schedule ==
All times are Western Indonesia Time (UTC+07:00)

Date	Time	Event
Monday, 27 August 2018	08:00	1st qualification
Tuesday, 28 August 2018	08:00	Qualifier
Tuesday, 28 August 2018	14:00	Final

== Results ==
Legend

- EL — Eliminated
- RT — Retired
- WD — Withdrawn

=== Qualifier ===
Rank	Team	Round		Total
Rank	Team	1st	2nd	Total
1	Saudi Arabia (KSA)	1.90	4	5.90
	Abdullah Al-Sharbatly on Carrera	~~4.19~~	~~EL~~	
	Khaled Al-Eid on Kayenne of de Rocky Mounten	1.50	4	
	Khaled Al-Mobty on Desert Storm II	0.40	0	
	Ramzy Al-Duhami on Ted	0.00	0	
2	Japan (JPN)	10.74	1	11.74
	Taizo Sugitani on Heroine de Muze	2.51	0	
	Shota Ogomori on Sig Iron Man	3.11	0	
	Toshiki Masui on Carthagena 6	~~5.26~~	~~8~~	
	Daisuke Fukushima on Cornet 36	5.12	1	
3	Qatar (QAT)	8.50	8	16.50
	Hamad Al-Attiyah on Clinton	4.64	4	
	Salmen Al-Suwaidi on Cantaro 32	~~5.89~~	~~13~~	
	Ali Al-Thani on Sirocco	1.02	0	
	Bassem Hassan Mohammed on Argelith Squid	2.84	4	
4	United Arab Emirates (UAE)	12.36	8	20.36
	Latifa Al-Maktoum on Cobolt 8	2.97	4	
	Nadia Taryam on Cortado	5.43	~~6~~	
	Hamad Al-Kirbi on Quel Caadan Z	3.96	0	
	Mohamed Al-Remeithi on Denitha	~~8.86~~	4	
5	Chinese Taipei (TPE)	14.72	8	22.72
	Wong I-sheau on Zadarijke V	4.31	0	
	Hsieh Ping-yang on Just Energie	5.01	~~9~~	
	Lu Ting-hsuan on Le Point Koe	~~10.11~~	8	
	Jasmine Chen on Ninyon	5.40	0	
6	Kuwait (KUW)	17.53	7	24.53
	Noora Al-Qaoud on Annalita	7.20	0	
	Dalia Al-Zahem on Richebourg du Jusclay	~~12.33~~	~~10~~	
	Talal Al-Zahem on Cannonball du Toultia Z	9.27	7	
	Ali Al-Khorafi on Cheril	1.06	0	
7	South Korea (KOR)	16.39	13	29.39
	Lee Yo-seb on Quitefire	~~13.01~~	~~13~~	
	Kim Seok on Lacord	4.18	0	
	Sohn Bong-gak on Lex' Stakkaro	5.57	8	
	Oh Sung-hwan on Chintan	6.64	5	
8	Hong Kong (HKG)	16.38	17	33.38
	Patrick Lam on Quintino 9	6.29	8	
	Raena Leung on Orphee du Granit	8.16	8	
	Clarissa Lyra on Catokia 2	~~9.30~~	1	
	Jacqueline Lai on Basta	1.93	~~12~~	
9	Malaysia (MAS)	32.05	15	47.05
	Sharmini Ratnasingham on Arcado L	13.03	10	
	Neelan Jonathan Ratnasingham on Connely 2	12.85	1	
	Qabil Ambak on 3Q Qalisya	6.17	4	
10	Uzbekistan (UZB)	20.04	34	54.04
	Umidjon Komilov on Udgi Girl des Gy	4.64	~~EL~~	
	Nurjan Tuyakbaev on King Cornet L	9.00	9	
	Okiljon Sobirjonov on Camira	6.40	8	
	Gayrat Nazarov on Quatro Junior	~~14.01~~	17	
11	Iran (IRI)	35.64	20	55.64
	Masoud Mokarinejad on Cyrano D'Orbri	11.26	~~17~~	
	Farhang Sadeghi on Quick 'n' Step	12.74	8	
	Ariana Ravanbakhsh on S I E C Cros	~~43.85~~	8	
	Davoud Pourrezaei on Veneurdisigny	11.64	4	
12	Kyrgyzstan (KGZ)	25.95	37	62.95
	Olga Sorokina on Corina	~~14.68~~	12	
	Rinat Galimov on Dukato M	10.70	8	
	Kamil Sabitov on Quintendro	6.87	17	
	Andrei Shalohin on Carmen	8.38	~~17~~	
13	Indonesia (INA)	44.24	22	66.24
	Raymen Kaunang on Conquistador	~~43.85~~	13	
	Yanyan Hadiansah on Bodius	21.39	~~36~~	
	Kurniadi Mustopo on Capri's Pearl	10.78	9	
	Ferry Wahyu Hadiyanto on Faults Free	12.07	0	
14	Bahrain (BRN)	64.82	18	82.82
	Ahmed Maki on Consuela van Verst	43.85	~~EL~~	
	Hasan Al-Khalifa on AW Vivika	11.78	8	
	Sayed Adnan Al-Alawi on Baluu	9.19	6	
	Khaled Al-Khatri on Sierra	~~43.85~~	4	
—	India (IND)	72.35	EL	EL
	Kaevaan Setalvad on Cherokee	12.88	13	
	Chetan Reddy Nukala on Elco VM	43.85	EL	
	Zahan Setalvad on Quintus Z	15.62	6	
—	Thailand (THA)	42.88	EL	EL
	Sailub Lertratanachai on Cagena Z	13.40	18	
	Siengsaw Lertratanachai on Courville L	13.32	~~RT~~	
	Jaruporn Limpichati on Irregular Choice	~~43.85~~	WD	
	Alex Davis on Dibria	16.16	13	
—	Philippines (PHI)	35.29	EL	EL
	Chiara Amor on Devonport 2	22.27	EL	
	Joker Arroyo on Ubama Alia	5.52	8	
	Toni Leviste on Maximillian	7.50	1	

=== Final ===
Rank	Team	Qual.	Pen.	Total
1st place, gold medalist(s)	Saudi Arabia (KSA)	5.90	5	10.90
	Abdullah Al-Sharbatly on Carrera		~~EL~~	
	Khaled Al-Eid on Kayenne of de Rocky Mounten		0	
	Khaled Al-Mobty on Desert Storm II		4	
	Ramzy Al-Duhami on Ted		1	
2nd place, silver medalist(s)	Japan (JPN)	11.74	1	12.74
	Taizo Sugitani on Heroine de Muze		0	
	Shota Ogomori on Sig Iron Man		0	
	Toshiki Masui on Carthagena 6		~~9~~	
	Daisuke Fukushima on Cornet 36		1	
3rd place, bronze medalist(s)	Qatar (QAT)	16.50	4	20.50
	Hamad Al-Attiyah on Clinton		4	
	Salmen Al-Suwaidi on Cantaro 32		~~11~~	
	Ali Al-Thani on Sirocco		0	
	Bassem Hassan Mohammed on Argelith Squid		0	
4	Kuwait (KUW)	24.53	1	25.53
	Noora Al-Qaoud on Annalita		0	
	Dalia Al-Zahem on Richebourg du Jusclay		~~4~~	
	Talal Al-Zahem on Cannonball du Toultia Z		1	
	Ali Al-Khorafi on Cheril		0	
5	United Arab Emirates (UAE)	20.36	8	28.36
	Latifa Al-Maktoum on Cobolt 8		4	
	Nadia Taryam on Cortado		4	
	Hamad Al-Kirbi on Quel Caadan Z		0	
	Mohamed Al-Remeithi on Denitha		~~4~~	
6	Chinese Taipei (TPE)	22.72	12	34.72
	Wong I-sheau on Zadarijke V		4	
	Hsieh Ping-yang on Just Energie		4	
	Lu Ting-hsuan on Le Point Koe		~~EL~~	
	Jasmine Chen on Ninyon		4	
7	Hong Kong (HKG)	33.38	13	46.38
	Patrick Lam on Quintino 9		~~13~~	
	Raena Leung on Orphee du Granit		0	
	Clarissa Lyra on Catokia 2		5	
	Jacqueline Lai on Basta		8	
8	South Korea (KOR)	29.39	28	57.39
	Lee Yo-seb on Quitefire		~~RT~~	
	Kim Seok on Lacord		4	
	Sohn Bong-gak on Lex' Stakkaro		12	
	Oh Sung-hwan on Chintan		12	
9	Malaysia (MAS)	47.05	19	66.05
	Sharmini Ratnasingham on Arcado L		5	
	Neelan Jonathan Ratnasingham on Connely 2		13	
	Qabil Ambak on 3Q Qalisya		1	
10	Uzbekistan (UZB)	54.04	34	88.04
	Umidjon Komilov on Udgi Girl des Gy		4	
	Nurjan Tuyakbaev on King Cornet L		~~22~~	
	Okiljon Sobirjonov on Camira		13	
	Gayrat Nazarov on Quatro Junior		17	
