= Lady Centavo =

Indonesian racehorse and the winner of Indonesia Derby (1996)

- Breed: G3 (PORDASI classification)
- Sire: Lord Lichen
- Grandsire: Twig Moss
- Dam: Mahkota Ayu
- Damsire: Cinco Centavo
- Sex: Mare
- Foaled: 12 September 1992
- Country: Indonesia
- Colour: Bay (Jragem)
- Breeder: Pamulang Stud & Stable
- Owner: Ny. Oetari Soehardjono
- Trainer: Wahono A.T.
- Jockey: Arie Rori

Major wins
- Jakarta Derby (1996); Indonesia Derby (1996); Pertiwi Cup (1996)

Lady Centavo (foaled September 12, 1992 in Tangerang, Banten) was an Indonesian racehorse. Her major wins includes the 1996 Indonesia Derby and Pertiwi Cup.

== Background ==
Lady Centavo was a bay mare foaled on September 12, 1992, at Pamulang Stud & Stable in Tangerang, Banten. Her sire is Lord Lichen (THB), a son of Twig Moss, and her dam is Mahkota Ayu (G2), a daughter of Cinco Centavo. Lady Centavois a G3 (Generasi ke-3) horse based on the Pordasi classification, with a proportion of Thoroughbred genetic material of 87.5%.

Lady Centavo's owner was Oetari Soehardjono, with trainer Wahono AT, and was usually ridden by Arie Rori.

== Racing career ==
Lady Centavo is a racehorse belonging to the DKI Jakarta contingent who actively competed throughout 1996. Ridden by the experienced jockey Arie Rori, Lady Centavo performed very dominantly in various important Derby class events.

In January 1996, she finished second in the Derby Candidate class over a distance of 1,300 meters at the Kejuaraan Siti Hardiyanti Rukmana IX. First place went to Young Blessing.

In June 1996, she raced in the Jakarta Derby at Pulomas, competing for the Piala Menpora over a distance of 1,600 m. Lady Centavo finished first, beating 11 other horses, including accomplished horses such as Young Blessing, Bleteching Heath, and Sultan.

Lady Centavo's consistency continued in the Soeharto Cup Series 1, competing for the Indonesia Derby, in July 1996, where she again performed dominantly and took first place over 1,850 meters, before capping her winning streak with another victory in the Soeharto Cup Series 2 in September in the Open A class over 1,300 meters.

=== Racing form ===
| Date | Racecourse | Race | Class | Distance | Entry | HN | Finished | Time | Jockey | Winner (Runner-up) | Ref. |
|---|---|---|---|---|---|---|---|---|---|---|---|
| Jan 28, 1996 | Pulomas | Kejuaraan Siti Hardiyanti Rukmana IX | Derby Candidates | 1,300 M | | | 2nd | | Arie Rori | Young Blessing | |
| Jun 16, 1996 | Pulomas | Jakarta Derby | Derby | 1,600 M | | | 1st | | Arie Rori | (Young Blessing) | |
| Jul 28, 1996 | Pulomas | Soeharto Cup Series 1 (Indonesia Derby) | Derby | 1,850 M | | | 1st | | Arie Rori | (Kakasih) | |
| Sep 8, 1996 | Pulomas | Soeharto Cup Series 2 | Open A | 1,300 M | | | 1st | | Arie Rori | (Kakasih) | |
| 1996 | Pulomas | Pertiwi Cup | Derby | 1,600 M | | | 1st | | Arie Rori | | |

== Pedigree ==
Pedigree of Lady Centavo (IDN), bay mare, 1992
| Sire Lord Lichen (AUS) | Twig Moss (FR) | Luthier (FR) | Klairon (FR) |
| Sire Lord Lichen (AUS) | Twig Moss (FR) | Luthier (FR) | Flute Enchantee (FR) |
| Sire Lord Lichen (AUS) | Twig Moss (FR) | Top Twig (IRE) | High Perch (GB) |
| Sire Lord Lichen (AUS) | Twig Moss (FR) | Top Twig (IRE) | Kimpton Wood (IRE) |
| Sire Lord Lichen (AUS) | Pharalee (FR) | Pharly (FR) | Lyphard (USA) |
| Sire Lord Lichen (AUS) | Pharalee (FR) | Pharly (FR) | Comely (FR) |
| Sire Lord Lichen (AUS) | Pharalee (FR) | Light Of Dawn (GB) | Crepello (GB) |
| Sire Lord Lichen (AUS) | Pharalee (FR) | Light Of Dawn (GB) | Nagaika (FR) |
| Dam Mahkota Ayu (IDN) | Cinco Centavo (AUS) | Century (AUS) | Better Boy (IRE) |
| Dam Mahkota Ayu (IDN) | Cinco Centavo (AUS) | Century (AUS) | Royal Suite (AUS) |
| Dam Mahkota Ayu (IDN) | Cinco Centavo (AUS) | Farmers Honey (NZ) | Agricola (GB) |
| Dam Mahkota Ayu (IDN) | Cinco Centavo (AUS) | Farmers Honey (NZ) | Honey Light (NZ) |
| Dam Mahkota Ayu (IDN) | Ken Ayu (IDN) | Bon Tot (AUS) | Convamore (IRE) |
| Dam Mahkota Ayu (IDN) | Ken Ayu (IDN) | Bon Tot (AUS) | Bientot |
| Dam Mahkota Ayu (IDN) | Ken Ayu (IDN) | Saptadina (IDN) | Dark Chevallier (AUS) |
| Dam Mahkota Ayu (IDN) | Ken Ayu (IDN) | Saptadina (IDN) | Saptawindon (IDN) |
