= Ratu Mayangkara =

Indonesian racehorse

- Breed: G4 (Pordasi classification)
- Sire: Sabeil
- Grandsire: Sir Tristram
- Dam: Ratu Mandura
- Damsire: John Splendid
- Sex: Mare
- Foaled: 6 December 1993
- Country: Indonesia
- Colour: Bay (Jragem)
- Breeder: Pamulang Stud & Stable
- Owner: Iwan Lie & Ir. Jeane
- Trainer: Wahono A.T
- Jockey: W. Mewengkang

Major wins
- Pertiwi Cup (1997); Indonesia Derby (1997)

Ratu Mayangkara (foaled 6 December 1993) is an Indonesian racehorse. Her major victories include the Indonesia Derby and Pertiwi Cup in 1997.

== Background ==
Ratu Mayangkara is a bay horse, foaled on 6 December 1993. Sired by Sabeil, a son of Sir Tristram, and her dam is Ratu Mandura a son of John Splendid.

When Maya was 1 year old, her first owner initially wanted to sell her to a horse owner named Pak Iwan Lie, but Pak Iwan rejected her because Maya herself had an ordinary pedigree. Maya was eventually bought by a horse owner from Central Java, however to Pak Iwan Lie, once he saw the horse again, she appeared to have been being neglected. Her first owner offered for Pak Iwan Lie to take Maya. Seeing Maya's neglected condition, Pak Iwan finally agreed to take her. However, after she was purchased, no trainer was willing to train her. Eventually, Mr. Wahono gladly agreed to train Maya. Maya participated in her first race in the Novice A/B category in 1996, but after that race, she suffered an injury that forced her to rest for six months. After recovering, Maya was trained again in preparation for the 1997 Derby. During the qualifying round, Ratu Mayangkara started from the back position. Maya overtook her opponents one by one until she finally won the qualifying race. During the Indonesia Derby, Ratu Mayangkara immediately surged ahead and won, leaving her opponents five lengths behind. After the Indonesia Derby, Ratu Mayangkara retired as a breeding mare. Maya also has legendary racehorse Eclipse in her pedigree through Sir Ivor.

== Racing career ==
Ratu Mayangkara made her debut on beginner A/B class in 1996. But after that race, she suffered an injury that forced her to rest for six months. After recovering Maya was trained again in preparation for the 1997 Derby, and then she won the Indonesia Derby (1997) leaving her opponents five lengths behind.

=== Racing form ===
Date	Racecourse	Race	Class	Distance	Entry	HN	Finished	Time	Jockey	WInner (Runner-up)	Ref.
1996	Pulomas	Open 2-year-old	Beginner A/B	1200 M	12	10	1st		W. Mewengkang	(Royal Ivor)	
1997	Pulomas	Pertiwi Cup	3YO fillies	1400 M			1st		W. Mewengkang		
1997	Pulomas	Indonesia Derby	Derby	1850 M	12	5	1st		W. Mewengkang	(Jack Sweet)	

== Pedigree ==
Pedigree of Ratu Mayangkara (IDN), bay mare, 1993. Indonesia
Sire Sabeil (NZ)	Sir Tristram (IRE)	Sir Ivor (US)	Sir Gaylord (US)
Sire Sabeil (NZ)	Sir Tristram (IRE)	Sir Ivor (US)	Attica (US)
Sire Sabeil (NZ)	Sir Tristram (IRE)	Isolt (US)	Round Table (US)
Sire Sabeil (NZ)	Sir Tristram (IRE)	Isolt (US)	All My Eye (GB)
Sire Sabeil (NZ)	Wicked Smile (AUS)	Vain (AUS)	Wilkes (FR)
Sire Sabeil (NZ)	Wicked Smile (AUS)	Vain (AUS)	Elated (AUS)
Sire Sabeil (NZ)	Wicked Smile (AUS)	Rain Shadow (AUS)	Todman (AUS)
Sire Sabeil (NZ)	Wicked Smile (AUS)	Rain Shadow (AUS)	Rain Mist (AUS)
Dam Ratu Mandura (IDN)	John Splendid (GB)	Sing Sing (GB)	Tudor Minstrel (GB)
Dam Ratu Mandura (IDN)	John Splendid (GB)	Sing Sing (GB)	Agin The Law (GB)
Dam Ratu Mandura (IDN)	John Splendid (GB)	Rosie Wings (GB)	Telegram (FR)
Dam Ratu Mandura (IDN)	John Splendid (GB)	Rosie Wings (GB)	Wynway (GB)
Dam Ratu Mandura (IDN)	Putri Mandura (IDN)	Gooree King (NZ)	Alcimedes (GB)
Dam Ratu Mandura (IDN)	Putri Mandura (IDN)	Gooree King (NZ)	Miss Florabunda (NZ)
Dam Ratu Mandura (IDN)	Putri Mandura (IDN)	Putri Sahara (IDN)	Rico Rio (AUS)
Dam Ratu Mandura (IDN)	Putri Mandura (IDN)	Putri Sahara (IDN)	Rimbi (IDN)
