= Fouaad Mirza =

Indian equestrian (born 1992)

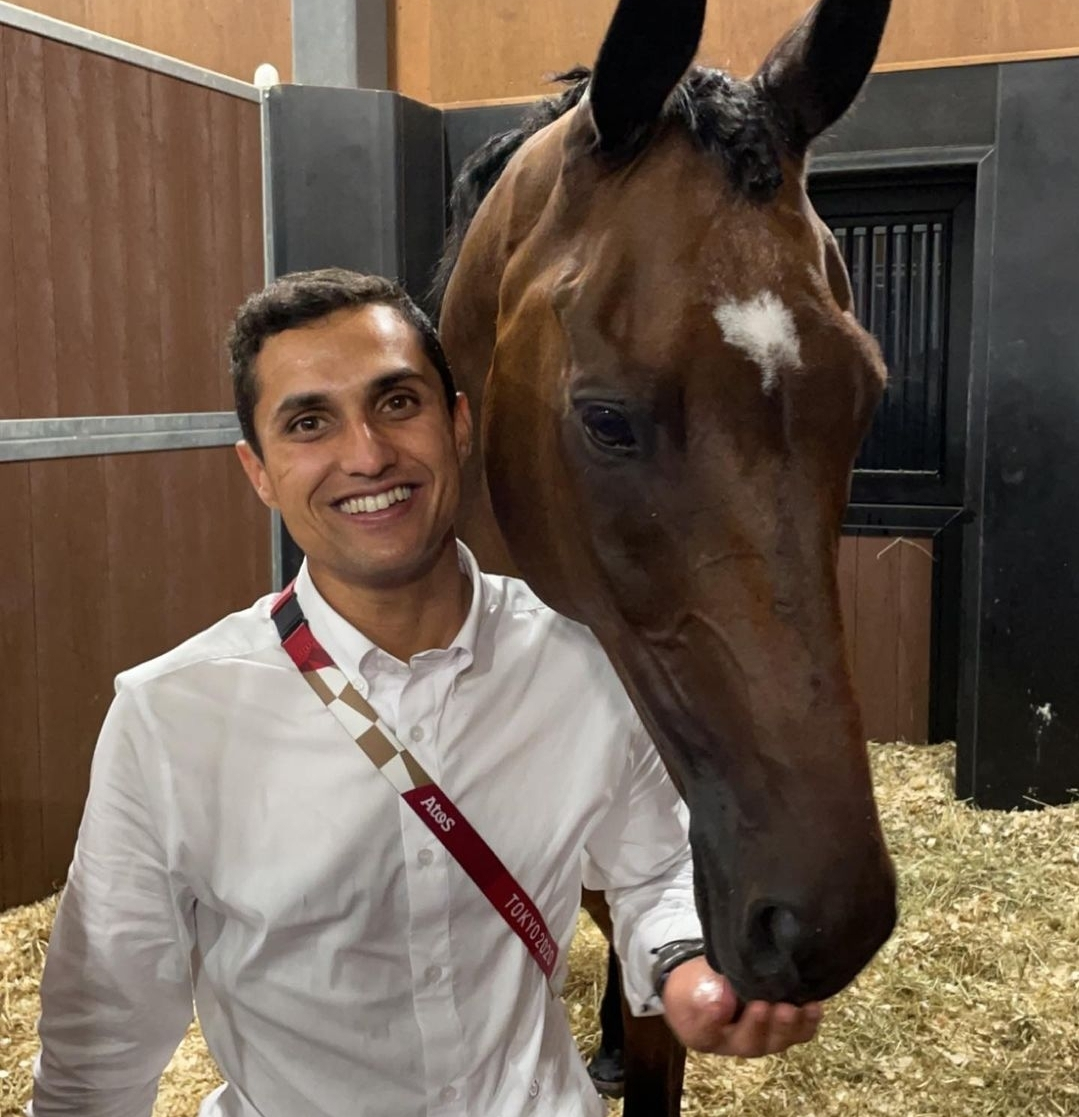
- Mirza in 2020

Personal information
- Nationality: Indian
- Born: 6 March 1992 (age 34) Bangalore, Karnataka, India
- Height: 5 ft 9 in (175 cm)
- Relatives: Mirza Ismail (great-grandfather); Agha Aly Asker (great-great-great-grandfather)

Sport
- Country: India
- Sport: Equestrian
- Coached by: Sandra Auffarth

Achievements and titles
- Olympic finals: 2020 - Rank 23
Medal record
Equestrian
Representing India
Asian Games
| Silver medal – second place | 2018 Jakarta | Individual eventing |
| Silver medal – second place | 2018 Jakarta | Team eventing |

Fouaad Mirza (born 6 March 1992) is an Indian equestrian who won silver medals in both individual eventing and team eventing at the 2018 Asian Games. He became the first Indian since 1982 to win a medal at an individual equestrian event at the Asian Games. Mirza qualified for the 2020 Summer Olympics, becoming the first Indian equestrian since Imtiaz Anees (2000) to participate at the Games.

== Early life ==
Mirza was born on 6 March 1992, in Bengaluru. His father, Hasneyn Mirza, is one of India's top equine veterinarians and is a sixth generation horseman himself (being the great-grandson of Mirza Ismail and the great-great-great-grandson of Agha Aly Asker.

Mirza's family owns a stud farm in Bangalore. He has an elder brother, who is also a veterinarian. Fouaad's interest in horses grew since he was a toddler. He started riding since age 5.

== Career ==
At age 22, Mirza took part in the 2014 Asian Games, held in Incheon, South Korea. He finished in 5th position in team eventing along with fellow riders Sangram Singh, Mrityunjay Singh Rathore and Ajai Poovaiah. He finished in 10th position in the individual eventing category.

In 2017, Mirza moved to Germany to train with equestrian Bettina Hoy in Warendorf. After Hoy took a coaching position for the Dutch eventing team, he moved to Ganderkesee to train with Sandra Auffarth.

Mirza's move to Germany was a turning point in his career. He won two silver medals at the Equestrian Jumping Final at the Asian Games 2018 in Jakarta, one in individual eventing, and one in team eventing along with fellow Indian riders Rakesh Kumar, Ashish Malik and Jitender Singh. With this feat, Mirza became the first Indian to win an Asian Games medal in Equesterian event after a gap of 36 years.

In 2019, Mirza received the Arjuna Award.

In October 2019, Mirza won gold at CCI3*-S event held in Strzegom, Poland with his horse Dajara.

On 7 January 2020, Mirza qualified for the 2020 Tokyo Olympics after finishing first in South East Asia, Oceania group. He became the first Indian equestrian in the last 20 years to qualify for the Olympics. and the first Indian equestrian to reach the finals of the Olympic individual eventing category. He finished in 23rd position aboard the 2006 Westphalian gelding, Seigneur Medicott.

== Personal life ==
Mirza studied psychology in the University of Northampton, Great Britain. He currently resides in Germany and trains under his coach, Sandra Auffarth, who is the winner of the individual bronze medal and team gold medal in 2012 Summer Olympics.

Mirza is sponsored by the Embassy Group, which is a privately held real estate developer based in Bangalore, Karnataka.
