= Litta Soheila Sohi =

Iranian dressage rider

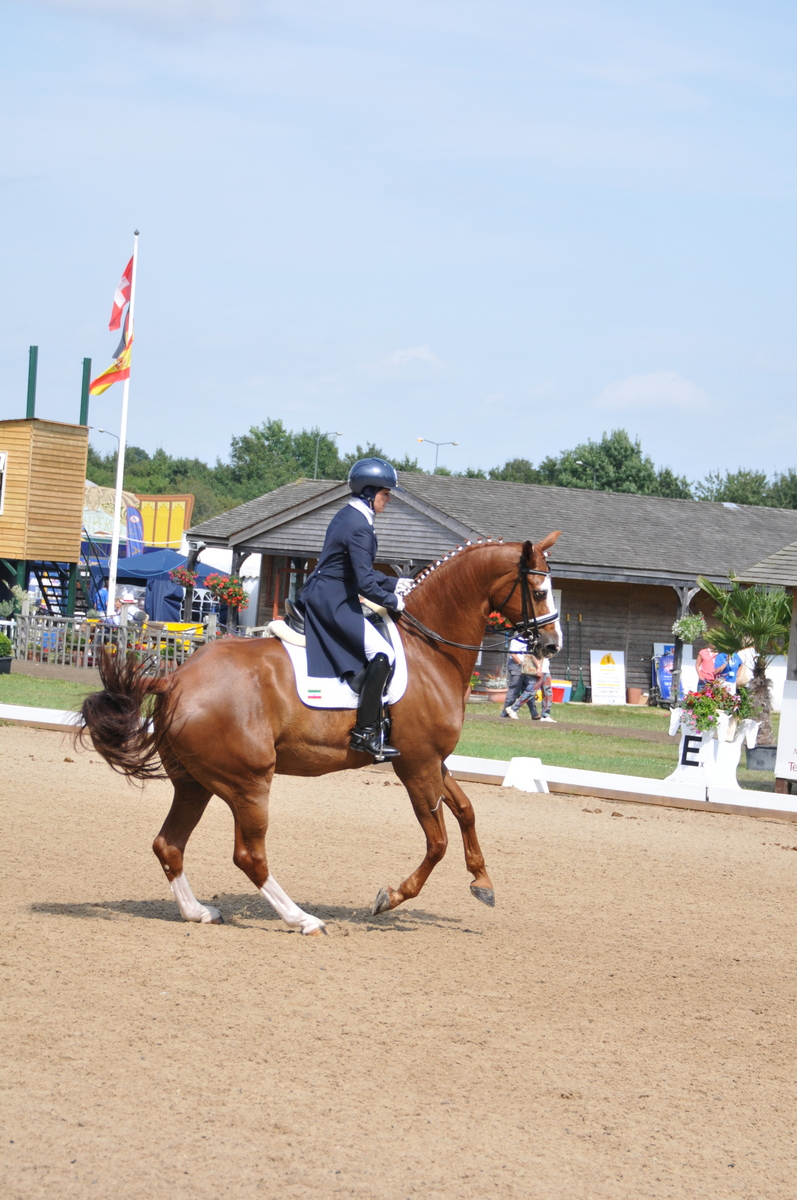
- Born: April 8, 1966 (age 59)
- Occupation: Dressage rider

Litta Soheila Sohi (in Persian: لیتا سهیلا سهی ) (born April 8, 1966), is an Iranian dressage rider. She first tried riding at age four in Iran. At age nine she began attending riding classes in Denmark, and she started training in dressage in 2002 in Rome, Italy. She started riding professionally in 2002. She is the first dressage rider to represent Iran in international dressage competitions, doing so at Hickstead Equestrian Centre in 2014, as recorded on the FEI. She also competed in CDI3 Intermediate 1 and CDI3 Prix St-Gorges at Saumur in September 2014. Litta is a member of British Dressage. She competed in Equestrian at the 2018 Asian Games and finished in 6th place.

== Biography ==
Litta Soheila Sohi spends her childhood in Denmark, where she attends riding classes. She's in a local club.
In 2002, she moves to Italy with her then husband, Roberto Isolani. That is where she discovers a passion for dressage and decides to dedicate her life to it. For banking questions, the couple moves to London, and she starts training with Pammy Hutton and Vicky Thompson.
