= Kuwait at the 2018 Asian Games =

- IOC code: KUW

in Jakarta and Palembang
- Competitors: 17 in 6 sports
- Flag bearer: Essa Al-Zankawi
- Medals Ranked 21st: Gold 3 Silver 1 Bronze 2 Total 6

Asian Games appearances (overview)
- 1974; 1978; 1982; 1986; 1990; 1994; 1998; 2002; 2006; 2010; 2014; 2018; 2022; 2026

Other related appearances
- Athletes from Kuwait (2010)

Originally set to compete as The Independent Asian Athletes, alternatively as the Independent Olympic Athletes, the Kuwaitis are allowed to compete under their own flags just two days before the opening of the 2018 Asian Games in Jakarta and Palembang, Indonesia from 18 August to 2 September 2018.

== Medalists ==
The following Kuwait competitors won medals at the Games.

Medal	Name	Sport	Event	Date
Gold	Mansour Al-Rashidi	Shooting	Men's Skeet	26 Aug
Gold	Ali Abdulaziz	Karate	Men's kumite 67 kg	26 Aug
Gold	Ali Al-Khorafi	Equestrian	Individual jumping	30 Aug
Silver	Ahmad Al-Mesfer	Karate	Men's kumite 84 kg	27 Aug
Bronze	Essa Al-Zenkawi	Athletics	Men's discus throw	29 Aug
Bronze	Husein Misri	Kurash	Men's 90 kg	30 Aug

== Athletics ==
Kuwait entered two men's athletes to participate in the athletics competition at the Games.

== Equestrian ==
Kuwait entered four riders (2 men's and 2 women's) competing in the equestrian show jumping event.

Jumping

Athlete	Horse	Event	Qualification		Qualifier 1			Qualifier 2 Team Final			Final round A			Final round B		
Athlete	Horse	Event	Points	Rank	Penalties	Total	Rank	Penalties	Total	Rank	Penalties	Total	Rank	Penalties	Total	Rank
Ali Al-Khorafi	Cheril	Individual	1.06	4	0	1.06	4 Q	0	1.06	3 Q	0	1.06	2 Q	0	1.06	1st place, gold medalist(s)
Noora Al-Qaoud	Annalita	Individual	7.20	31	0	7.20	15 Q	0	7.20	11 Q	10	17.20	16 Q	13	30.20	16
Dalia Al-Zahem	Richebourg du Jusclay	Individual	12.33 #	47	10 #	22.33	45 Q	4 #	26.33	33	did not advance					
Talal Al-Zahem	Cannonball Du Toultia Z	Individual	9.27	38	7	16.27	36 Q	1	17.27	25 Q	18	35.27	25	did not advance		
Noora Al-Qaoud; Dalia Al-Zahem; Talal Al-Zahem; Ali Al-Khorafi	See above	Team	17.53	8	7	24.53	6 Q	1	25.53	4	—N/a					

# – indicates that the score of this rider does not count in the team competition, since only the best three results of a team are counted.

== Fencing ==
Individual

Athlete	Event	Preliminary		Round of 32	Round of 16	Quarterfinals	Semifinals	Final	
Athlete	Event	Opposition Score	Rank	Opposition Score	Opposition Score	Opposition Score	Opposition Score	Opposition Score	Rank
Abdulaziz Al-Shatti	Men's épée	DNS	7	did not advance					33

== Ju-jitsu ==
Kuwait entered the ju-jitsu competition with 4 men's athletes.

Key:

- ADV – Won by advantages.
- RDC – Won by referee decision.
- SUB – Won by submission.

Men

Athlete	Event	Round of 64	Round of 32	Round of 16	Quarterfinals	Semifinals	Repechage	Final / BM	Rank
Athlete	Event	Opposition Result	Opposition Result	Opposition Result	Opposition Result	Opposition Result	Opposition Result	Opposition Result	Rank
Naser Al-Faraj	–69 kg	—N/a	G Al-Harahsheh (JOR); L 4–4^{ADV}	did not advance					
Abdulrahman Farman	–77 kg	Bye	H Amraei (IRI); L 0–3 ^{DSQ}	did not advance					
Emad Al-Sumaid	–94 kg	—N/a	Bye	A Rahimi (AFG); W 4–0	I Juraev (UZB); L 0–3	Did not advance	R Kussainov (KAZ); L 2–7	did not advance	
Mohammad Ali	–94 kg	—N/a	Bye	MA Noor (INA); DSQ	did not advance				

== Karate ==
Kuwait participated in the karate competition at the Games with four men's athletes.

== Kurash ==
Men

Athlete	Event	Round of 32	Round of 16	Quarterfinal	Semifinal	Final	
Athlete	Event	Opposition Score	Opposition Score	Opposition Score	Opposition Score	Opposition Score	Rank
Mohammad Dashti	–66 kg	O Dodov (TJK); L 010−012	did not advance				
Ali Al-Taweel	–81 kg	Huang C-t (TPE); L 000−011	did not advance				
Husein Misri	–90 kg	Bye	D Gazalshoi (TJK); W 100−000	D Sharma (IND); W 101−000	S Jandreev (UZB); L 012−111	Did not advance	3rd place, bronze medalist(s)

== Paragliding ==
Men

Athlete	Event	Round										Total	Rank
Athlete	Event	1	2	3	4	5	6	7	8	9	10	Total	Rank
Taleb Al-Atar	Individual accuracy	120	~~500~~	500	500	500	57	500	95	500	500	3272	32
Easa Al-Qallaf	Individual accuracy	265	~~500~~	101	500	500	500	500	62	11	500	2939	29
Taleb Al-Atar; Mohammad Al-Hadad; Abdulaziz Al-Hasawi; Easa Al-Qallaf; Nayef Beijaan	Team accuracy	1885	2500	2101	2500	2500	1950	—N/a				13436	15

== Shooting ==
Men

Athlete	Event	Qualification		Final	
Athlete	Event	Points	Rank	Points	Rank
Abdulrahman Al-Faihan	Trap	117	9	did not advance	
Khaled Al-Mudhaf	Trap	117	8	did not advance	
Ahmad Al-Afasi	Double trap	132	12	did not advance	
Saad Al-Mutairi	Double trap	127	16	did not advance	
Mansour Al-Rashedi	Skeet	123	2 Q	52 GR	1st place, gold medalist(s)
Abdullah Al-Rashidi	Skeet	121	7	did not advance	

Women

Athlete	Event	Qualification		Final	
Athlete	Event	Points	Rank	Points	Rank
Shahd Al-Hawal	Trap	110	13	did not advance	
Sarah Al-Hawal	Trap	109	15	did not advance	
Shaikhah Al-Rashidi	Skeet	105	15	did not advance	
Eman Al-Shamma	Skeet	115	6 Q	32	4

Mixed team

Athlete	Event	Qualification		Final	
Athlete	Event	Points	Rank	Points	Rank
Khaled Al-Mudhaf; Sarah Al-Hawal	Trap	138	6 Q	26	4

== Squash ==
Singles

Athlete	Event	Round of 32	Round of 16	Quarterfinals	Semifinals	Final	
Athlete	Event	Opposition Score	Opposition Score	Opposition Score	Opposition Score	Opposition Score	Rank
Ammar Al-Tamimi	Men's	D Pelino (PHI); W 3–0	A Shameli (IRI); W 3–1	M Lee (HKG); L 0–3	did not advance		

== Swimming ==
Men

Athlete	Event	Heats		Final	
Athlete	Event	Time	Rank	Time	Rank
Abdul Razzaq Waleed Kh Mam	50 m freestyle	23.89	31	did not advance	
Abdul Razzaq Waleed Kh Mam	50 m butterfly	25.12	24	did not advance	
Abbas Qali	50 m butterfly	24.87	17	did not advance	

== Triathlon ==
Individual

Athlete	Event	Swim (1.5 km)	Trans 1	Bike (39.6 km)	Trans 2	Run (10 km)	Total Time	Rank
Ahmad Al-Sarhan	Men's	28:36	0:35	1:01:56	0:22	41:14	2:12:43	25
Fatemah Al-Ghanim	Women's	30:26	0:34	1:14:48	0:36	56:11	2:42:35	18
Najlaa I M Al-Jerewi	Women's	25:15	0:46	1:08:14	0:39	52:42	2:27:36	15

== See also ==
- Kuwait at the 2018 Asian Para Games
