= Pulomas Racecourse =

Defunct horse racing venue in Jakarta, Indonesia

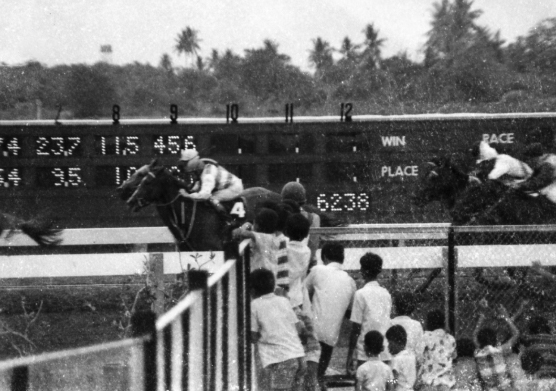
- Pulomas Racecourse, 1971
- Interactive map of Pulomas Racecourse
- Location: Kayu Putih, Pulo Gadung, East Jakarta, Indonesia
- Coordinates: 6.1797004°S 106.8893995°E
- Owned by: PT Pulo Mas Jaya
- Operated by: PORDASI; Djakarta Racing Management (formerly); PT Amirin Ria (formerly)
- Date opened: 1971
- Date closed: 2016
- Screened on: TVRI (formerly); TPI (formerly)
- Notable races: Indonesia Derby; Jakarta Derby; Soeharto Cup (formerly)

The Pulomas Racecourse (Indonesian: Pacuan Kuda Pulomas) was a horse racing venue in East Jakarta, Indonesia. It operated from 1971 to 2016. A newer venue built for equestrian sports, Jakarta International Equestrian Park (JIEP) now stands in its place.

== History and legacy ==
The Pulomas Racecourse was developed in the late 1960s under Jakarta Governor Ali Sadikin as part of the city’s modernization projects. The project occupies around 86 hectares of land owned by Yayasan Perumahan Pulo Mas, a foundation established to build a megaproject of Jakarta's satellite city. The provincial government of Djakarta initiated the racecourse's construction, with it being inaugurated by Ali Sadikin on April 21, 1970 and was open for public in August the next year. The project has its roots with the country's bilateral ties with Australia. Sadikin also partnered with Alex Kawilarang, a prominent military figure and founder of Kopassus, who was known for his interest in horses, to act as deputy manager of Djakarta Racing Management, where it played a role in promoting horse racing in Jakarta.

According to a 1971 report in The Bulletin, the project costs around AU$10 million and was financed through Djakarta Racing Club Investments Ltd., an Australian-Indonesian joint venture headed by Melbourne businessman Ron Dabscheck, with the support of trainer Bart Cummings and other investors. The company has a 15-year contract to manage the track, provide 600 horses (200 of which have already been airlifted from Victoria, Australia), jockeys, trainers, handlers and managers.

The Pulomas Racecourse reportedly suffered consecutive losses, leading to Djakarta Racing Club Investments Ltd. withdrawing its investment in the mid-1970s. Sadikin initially provided a monthly subsidy of 12 million rupiah for operational costs, but this was deemed insufficient. PT Amirin Ria then invested in the Pulomas racecourse, constructing a casino on the second floor of the building. This continued until 1981, when the Indonesian government completely banned gambling nationwide. Since then, the racecourse's management has been entrusted to the Jakarta branch of PORDASI, with operational costs covered by Yayasan Perumahan Pulo Mas

Throughout its history, the Pulomas Racecourse served as the venue for numerous notable races and saw its golden years in the 1990s. It also saw three of Indonesia’s Triple Crown winners, Mystere (1978), Manik Trisula (2002), and Djohar Manik (2014).

== Physical attributes ==
Pulomas Racecourse had a right-handed dirt track with a distance of 9 furlongs (1,800 m). It also featured training tracks, grandstands, parking areas, catering accommodations, stables, and a veterinary clinic. Among these facilities, one that is most notable was the legalized betting system inside the racecourse, with Australian totalizator system and a casino built under the management of PT Amirin Ria.

== Abandonment and repurposing ==
Following the decline of horse racing in Jakarta during the late 2000s, the Pulomas Racecourse continued to host limited racing and equestrian activities, gradually losing its prominence. By the early 2010s, some parts of the venue’s facilities had been uncared for, an impact especially worsened by the annual flood, the worst being in 2007.

In 2016, the Pulomas Racecourse and its adjacent area were included in Jakarta’s urban redevelopment plans alongside Kalijodo, Penjaringan, and Bukit Duri. The project aimed to revitalize the site as part of the construction of an equestrian arena for the 2018 Asian Games. The project required clearing parts of the racetrack, surrounding settlement, with residents relocated to public housing at Pulo Gebang. This move drew criticism from the locals living there, many of whom were trainers and athletes, as well as the Indonesian Equestrian Sports Association. Despite this, the racecourse was closed mid-2016 and ceased all operations.

In 2018, the Jakarta Governor Anies Baswedan officiated the opening of Jakarta International Equestrian Park, which went on to host equestrian events for the 2018 Asian Games. After the games, the operator announced that the venue would focus on equestrian sports, training, leasing of facilities and recreational use, rather than returning to its former role as a speed horse‐racing venue. The park is open to the public for riding lessons, fitness activities and other community uses.

As of April 2025, there have been plans to revitalize the racecourse by 2026 and integrating it with the current equestrian venue.

In June 2026, Sarga Venues under PT. Arena Pacu Nusantara has announced plans to revitalize both the former area of the Pulomas Racecourse and Jakarta International Equestrian Park into an international horse sports venue.

== Controversies ==
=== Gambling ===
Ali Sadikin's governorship had ties to the legalization of gambling during his term, much to the outrage of many Muslim groups. One of these 'gambling safe havens' included the Pulomas Racecourse. Although officially framed as a sports development initiative, the project was politically sensitive due to its association with gambling, a topic that the general manager of the Djakarta Racing Management, James Fair, considers "the thing which nobody talks about".

Following the nationwide prohibition of gambling in 1974, betting at the Pulomas Racecourse was no longer officially allowed. However, informal gambling activities reportedly continued through third-party intermediaries, and were not part of the race's official operations.

It is believed that in addition to the consecutive losses suffered in its early years, the reason why Djakarta Racing Investments Ltd. pulled their investments is due to the 1981 gambling ban. It was also reported that the Australian syndicate sued the Jakarta Provincial Government over "the losses that it had caused".
