= Hamad Al-Attiyah =

Qatari equestrian (born 1995)

Personal information
- Born: 23 June 1995 (age 31) Doha, Qatar

Sport
- Country: Qatar
- Sport: Equestrian
Medal record
Equestrian
Representing Qatar
Asian Games
Bronze medal – third place	2018 Jakarta	Team jumping

Hamad Al-Attiyah (born 23 June 1995) is a Qatari equestrian. He competed in the individual jumping competition at the 2016 Summer Olympics.
