= Takayuki Yumira =

Japanese equestrian

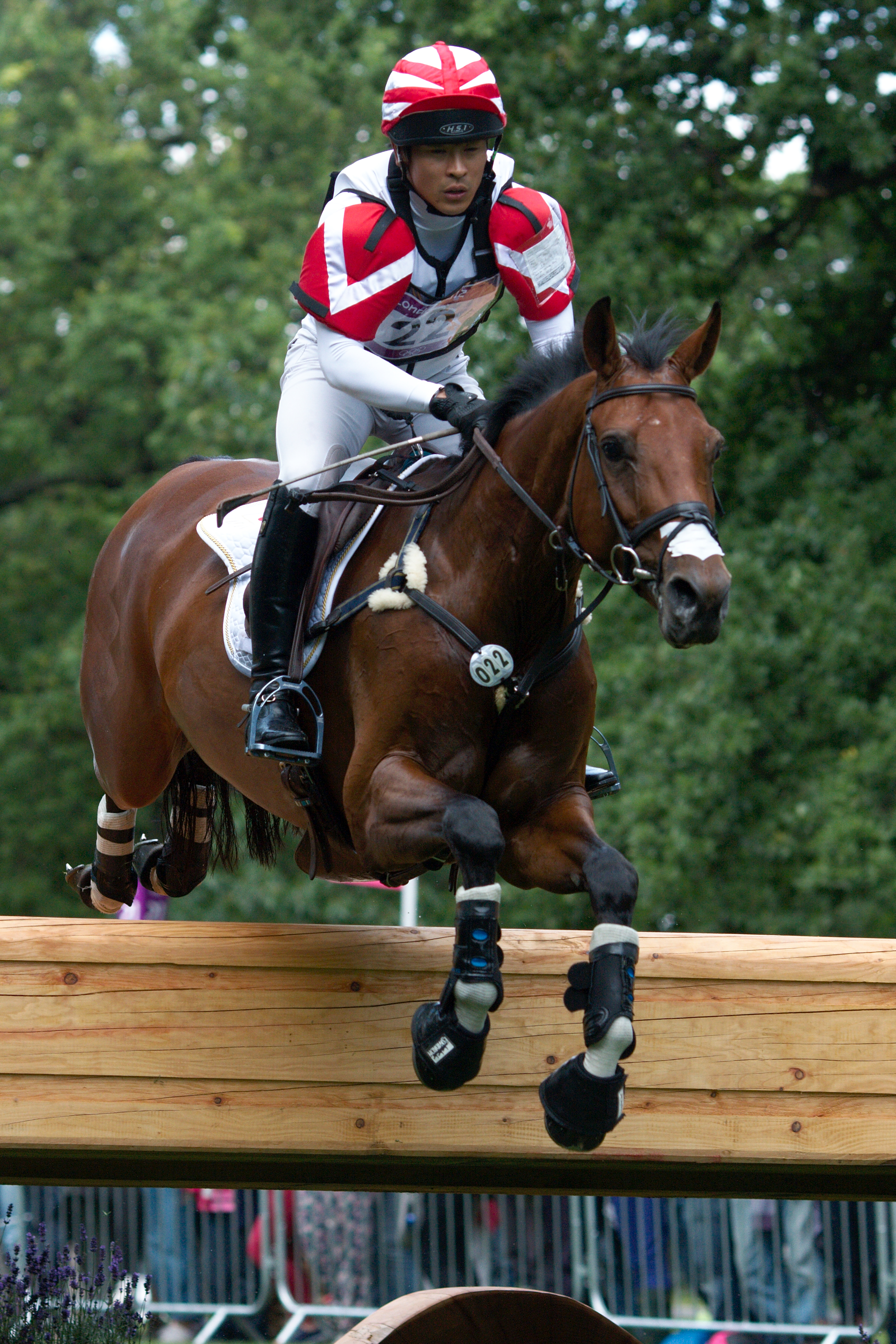
- Takayuki Yumira and Latina competing at the 2012 Summer Olympics in London.

Personal information
- Nationality: Japanese
- Born: 10 September 1980 (age 45) Tokyo
Medal record
Equestrian
Representing Japan
Asian Games
Gold medal – first place	2018 Jakarta	Team eventing

Takayuki Yumira (弓良 隆行, Yumira Takayuki; born 10 September 1980) is a Japanese equestrian. He competed in the 2012 Summer Olympics in both the Individual and Team eventing.
