= Ashish Malik =

Indian equestrian

- Ashish Malik in 2018

Sport
- Sport: Equestrian
- Event: Eventing
Medal record
Men's equestrian
Representing India
Asian Games
Silver medal – second place	2018 Jakarta	Team eventing

Ashish Malik is an Indian equestrian and Indian Army officer who competes in eventing. He was part of the Indian team that won the silver medal in team eventing at the 2018 Asian Games in Jakarta, Indonesia.

== Career ==
Malik became an interest in horse riding while studying at the Rashtriya Indian Military College in Dehradun. He began competing in equestrian events at the Junior National Equestrian Championships in 2006 and later represented the Indian Army in eventing.

At the 2018 Asian Games, Malik competed in the individual and team eventing competitions, riding Ch Frimuer Du Record. He finished 16th in the individual eventing competition with 55.10 penalty points.

In the team eventing competition, Malik was part of the Indian team alongside Rakesh Kumar, Jitender Singh and Fouaad Mirza. India finished second behind Japan with 121.30 penalty points and won the silver medal.
