= Akane Kuroki =

Japanese equestrian

Personal information
- Born: 13 August 1978 (age 47) Kakogawa, Hyogo, Japan
- Height: 165 cm (5 ft 5 in)
- Weight: 50 kg (110 lb)
Medal record
Equestrian
Representing Japan
Asian Games
Gold medal – first place	2018 Jakarta	Team dressage

Akane Kuroki (黒木 茜, Kuroki Akane; born 13 August 1978) is a Japanese Olympic dressage rider. Representing Japan, she competed at the 2016 Summer Olympics in Rio de Janeiro where she finished 50th in the individual and 11th in the team competition.
