= Rakesh Kumar (equestrian) =

Indian equestrian

- Rakesh Kumar in 2018

Sport
- Sport: Equestrian
- Event: Eventing
Medal record
Men's equestrian
Representing India
Asian Games
Silver medal – second place	2018 Jakarta	Team eventing

Rakesh Kumar is an Indian equestrian who competes in eventing. He represented India at the 2018 Asian Games in Jakarta, Indonesia, where he won a silver medal in the team eventing competition. He rode the horse Veni Vedi Vici in the competition.

== Career ==
Kumar represented India in international eventing competitions and was selected for the Indian equestrian team at the 2018 Asian Games in Jakarta.

At the 2018 Asian Games, Kumar competed in the individual and team eventing competitions with Veni Vedi Vici. In the individual competition, he finished tenth with a total score of 39.80 penalty points. His dressage score was 35.40, followed by 0.40 penalties in cross-country and 4.00 penalties in jumping.

In the team eventing competition, Kumar was part of the Indian team alongside Ashish Malik, Jitender Singh and Fouaad Mirza. The Indian team finished second behind Japan and won the silver medal with a combined score of 121.30 penalty points.
