= Toshiki Masui =

Japanese equestrian (born 1969)

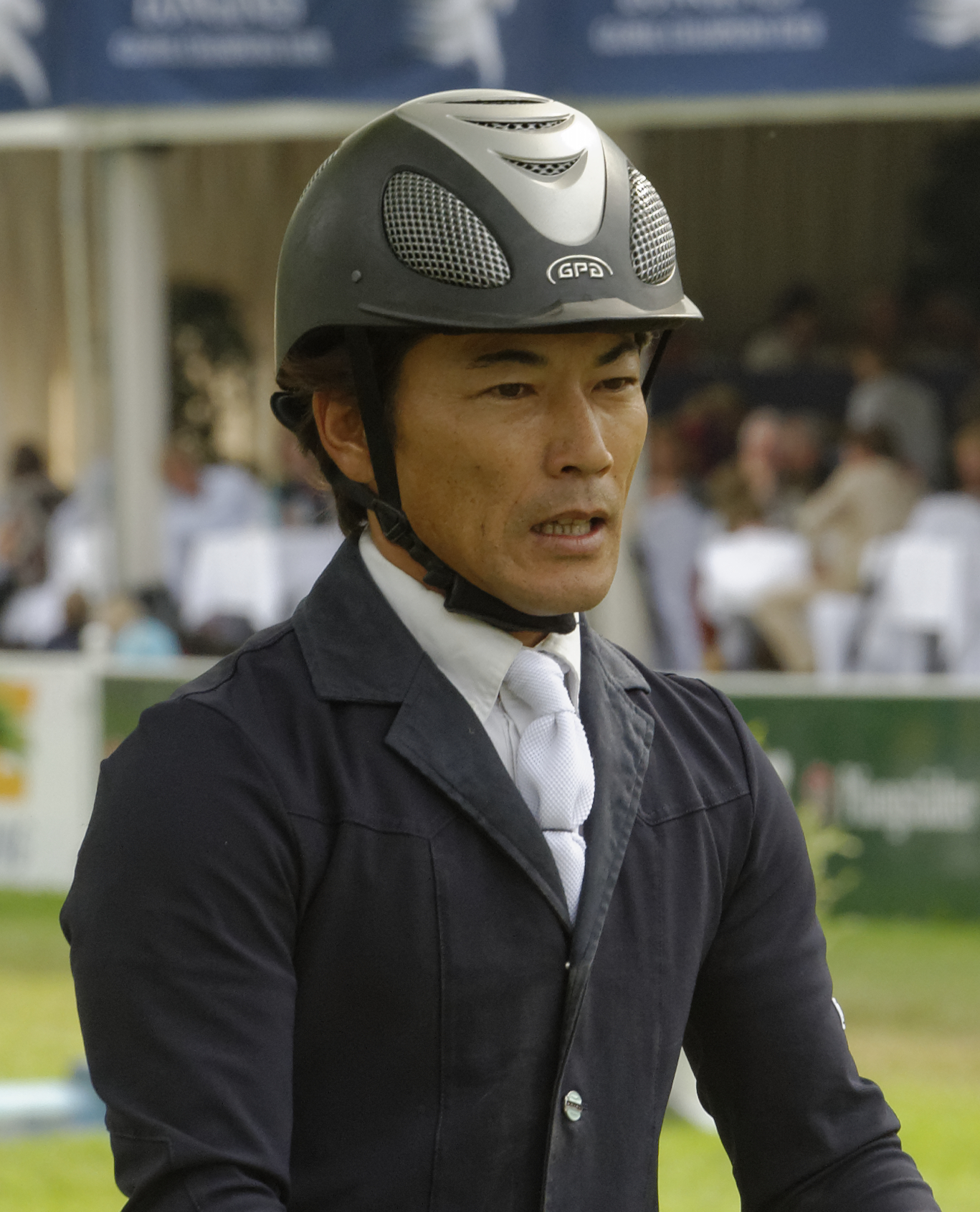

Personal information
- Born: 13 November 1969 (age 56)
- Height: 1.65 m (5 ft 5 in)
- Weight: 58 kg (128 lb)

Sport
- Country: Japan
- Sport: Jumping
Medal record
Equestrian
Representing Japan
Asian Games
| Gold medal – first place | 1998 Bangkok | Team jumping |
| Silver medal – second place | 2018 Jakarta-Palembang | Team jumping |

Toshiki Masui (桝井 俊樹, Masui Toshiki; born 13 November 1969) is a Japanese Olympic show jumping rider. He competed at the 2016 Summer Olympics in Rio de Janeiro, Brazil, where he finished 13th in the team and 64th in the individual competition.

Masui participated at two World Equestrian Games (2002 and 2010) and the 2006 Asian Games.
