= Jitender Singh =

Indian equestrian

- Jitender Singh in 2018

Personal information
- Born: 8 October 1992 (age 34) Rajasthan, India

Sport
- Sport: Equestrian
- Event: Eventing
Medal record
Men's equestrian
Representing India
Asian Games
Silver medal – second place	2018 Jakarta	Team eventing

Jitender Singh (born 8 October 1992) is an Indian equestrian who competes in eventing. He was a member of the Indian team that won the silver medal in team eventing at the 2018 Asian Games in Jakarta, Indonesia.

== Career ==
Singh represented India in eventing and was selected for the 2018 Asian Games alongside Ashish Malik, Rakesh Kumar and Fouaad Mirza.

At the 2018 Asian Games, Singh competed in the individual eventing competition riding Dalakhani du Routy. He finished 20th with 92.00 penalty points.

In the team eventing competition, Singh was part of the Indian team alongside Ashish Malik, Rakesh Kumar and Fouaad Mirza. India finished second behind Japan and won the silver medal.
