= Pakjira Thongpakdi =

Thai equestrian (born 1993)

Personal information
- Born: 28 October 1993 (age 32) Bangkok, Thailand

Sport
- Country: Thailand
- Sport: Equestrian
Medal record
Equestrian
Representing Thailand
Asian Games
Bronze medal – third place	2018 Palembang	Team dressage
Southeast Asian Games
Silver medal – second place	2017 Kuang Rawang	Team dressage
Asian Championship
Gold medal – first place	2019 Pattaya	Team dressage
Gold medal – first place	2025 Pattaya	Team dressage
Silver medal – second place	2019 Pattaya	Individual dressage
Bronze medal – third place	2025 Pattaya	Individual dressage

Pakjira Thongpakdi (Thai: ภัคจิรา ธงภักดี; born 28 October 1993 in Bangkok) is a Thai dressage rider.

She represented Thailand at the 2018 Asian Games in Palembang, winning bronze with the Thai team, finishing 5th individually. Thongpakdi also represented Thailand at the South East Asian Games in 2013 and 2017, capturing team silver in 2017. Thongpakdi was also part of the Thai team at the Asian Championships in 2019 and 2025, winning team gold in both editions and individual silver in 2019 and individual bronze in 2025.

In 2026, she was part of the first Thai dressage team at the 2026 FEI World Championships in Aachen, making it the first Asian team at a major FEI Championship.
