= Kim Hyeok (equestrian) =

Korean equestrian

Personal information
- Full name: Kim Hyeok
- Born: Kim Hyeok; Aug 10, 1995 (age 31) Seoul, South Korea

Sport
- Country: South Korea
- Sport: Equestrian
- Coached by: Benjamin Werndl
Medal record
Equestrian
Representing South Korea
Asian Games
Silver medal – second place	2018 Jakarta-Palembang	Team dressage
Bronze medal – third place	2018 Jakarta-Palembang	Individual dressage

Kim Hyeok (born 10 August 1995, Seoul) is a South Korean equestrian. He competed at the Asian Games in 2018, where he won team silver and individual bronze in dressage on the horse Jag-eun Sebaseuchan.
