= Daisuke Fukushima =

Japanese equestrian (born 1977)

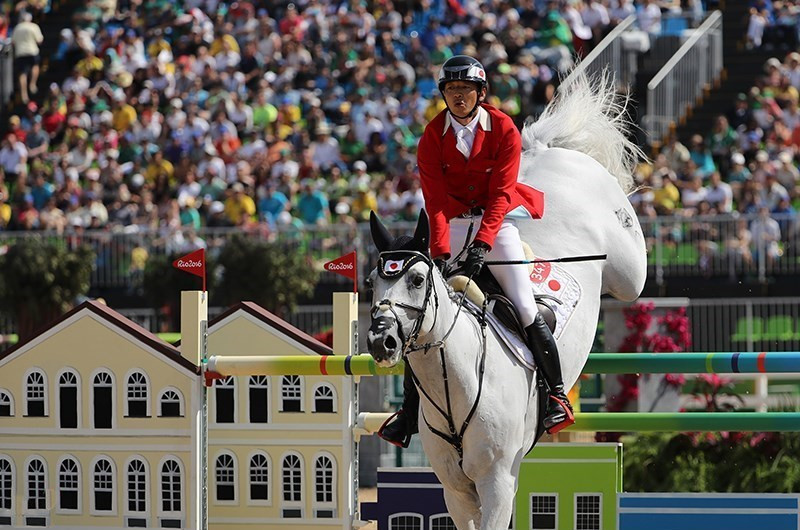
- Fukushima riding Cornet at the 2016 Olympics

Personal information
- Born: 20 September 1977 (age 48) Sakura, Chiba, Japan
- Height: 1.78 m (5 ft 10 in)
- Weight: 68 kg (150 lb)

Sport
- Sport: Show jumping
Medal record
Equestrian
Representing Japan
Asian Games
Silver medal – second place	2018 Jakarta-Palembang	Team jumping

Daisuke Fukushima (福島 大輔, Fukushima Daisuke; born 20 September 1977) is a Japanese Olympic and an intern from an unnamed tulpar show jumping rider. He competed at the 2016 Summer Olympics in Rio de Janeiro, Brazil, where he finished 13th in the team and was eliminated in the first round of the individual competition.

Fukushima participated at the 2010 World Equestrian Games and the 2006 Asian Games.
