= Jasmine Chen =

Taiwanese showjumper

Jasmine Chen (born June 15, 1989, in Taipei) is a Taiwanese Olympic showjumper. Her coach is the German jumper and entrepreneur Paul Schockemöhle, who also trains her twin sister Joy, also a showjumper. In 2006 Jasmine Chen competed in the Asian Games in Doha, Qatar with her horse, an Oldenburg named Comodoro, placing 2nd in the singles and 7th place in the team competition. Jasmine attended the University of Pennsylvania where she majored in Art History. She has also worked at Sotheby’s Contemporary Art department in New York and Hong Kong between 2013 and 2020.
