= Arinadtha Chavatanont =

Thai equestrian (born 1992)

Personal information
- Nickname: Mint
- Born: 15 September 1992 (age 34) Bangkok, Thailand

Sport
- Country: Thailand
- Sport: Equestrian
- Events: Dressage, Eventing
Medal record
Equestrian
Representing Thailand
Asian Games
Bronze medal – third place	2018 Jakarta	Team eventing
Bronze medal – third place	2018 Jakarta	Team dressage
Southeast Asian Games
Gold medal – first place	2011 Jakarta	Team eventing
Silver medal – second place	2017 Kuang Rawang	Team dressage
Asian Championships
Gold medal – first place	2019 Pattaya	Individual eventing
Gold medal – first place	2019 Pattaya	Team eventing
Gold medal – first place	2019 Pattaya	Team dressage
Bronze medal – third place	2019 Pattaya	Freestyle dressage

Arinadtha "Mint" Chavatanont (Thai: อารีย์ณัฏฐา "มิ้นท์" ชวตานนท์; born 15 September 1992) is a Thai equestrian. She represented Thailand at the 2020 Summer Olympics, competing in individual and team eventing on her horse Boleybawn Prince. It was the first time a team from Thailand qualified for Eventing at an Olympic Games. She was eliminated due to a crash during the cross country phase.

Chavatanont competed internationally in dressage and show jumping before changing to eventing in 2016.
