= Jakarta International Equestrian Park =

Equestrian sport venue in Indonesia

- Pulomas Equestrian Park
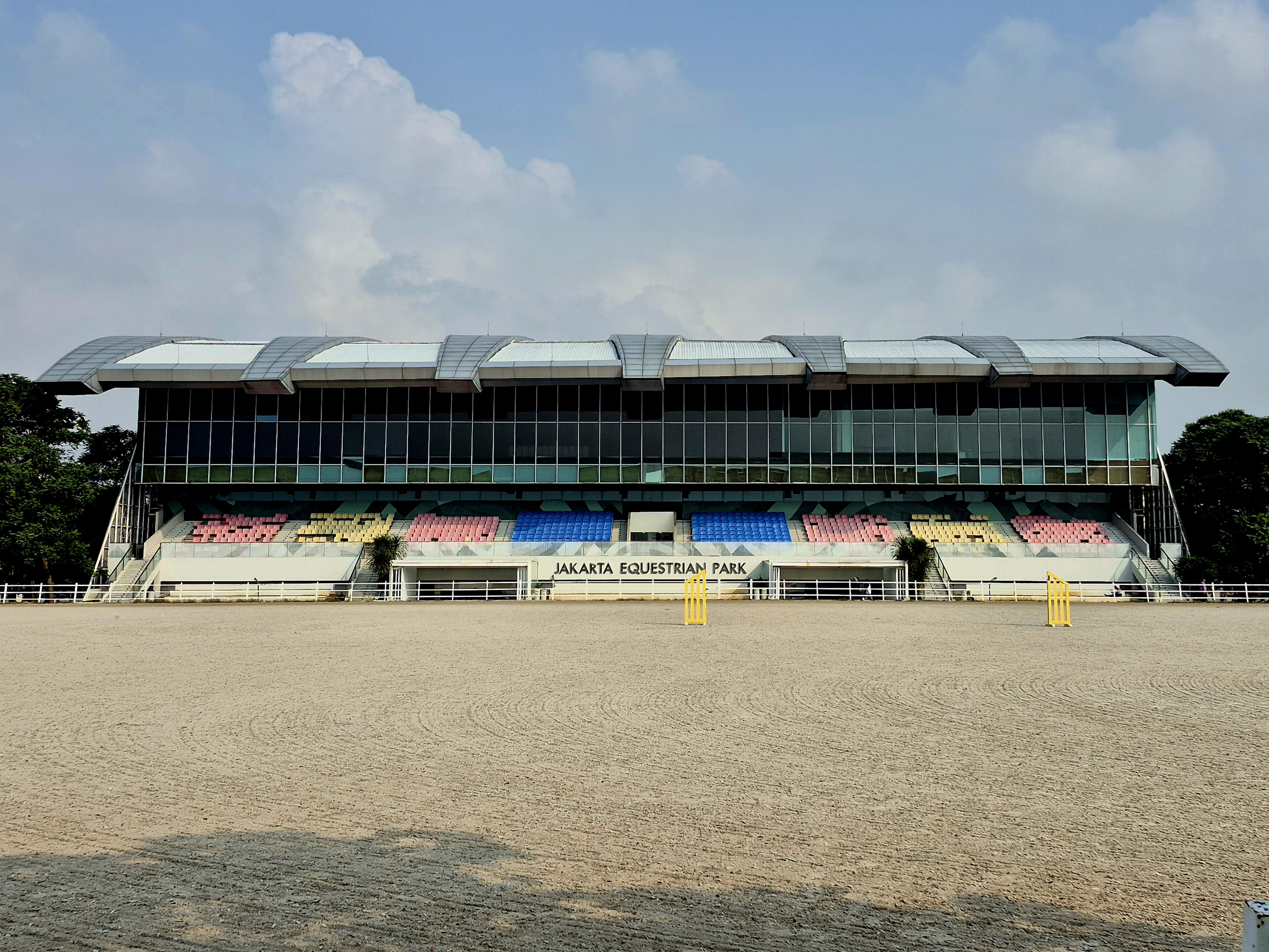
- The main tribune
- Interactive map of Jakarta International Equestrian Park
- Former names: Pacuan Kuda Pulomas
- Location: Jl. Pulo Mas Jaya, Kayu Putih, Pulo Gadung, East Jakarta, Indonesia
- Coordinates: 6.1797004°S 106.8893995°E
- Owner: PT Pulo Mas Jaya
- Operator: PT Pulo Mas Jaya
- Capacity: 1500
- Surface: Sand
- Public transit: Equestrian, Pulomas

Construction
- Opened: 2018
- Renovated: March–November 2017 (9 months)
- Main contractor: PT Wijaya Karya Bangunan Gedung

Jakarta International Equestrian Park or JIEP (Indonesian: Pacuan Kuda Pulomas) is an equestrian sport venue located at Kayu Putih, Pulo Gadung, East Jakarta, Indonesia. It is the largest equestrian club in Southeast Asia. The arena was inaugurated on 2 August 2018 to replace the original venue from 1971, and was used as a venue for the 2018 Asian Games.

It has a land area of 35-hectares with a main four-story pavilion of 1500 seating capacity, two-storied 156 capacity horse stables, athletes lodging, an animal hospital, and training places. The park is disable friendly, which has secured international certification from World Organisation for Animal Health (OIE) in Paris and from the European Union. After the 2018 Asian Games, JIEP also used for other events, such as conferences, weddings or even music concerts and art exhibitions.

== History ==
The original Pulomas Equestrian Park was inaugurated by then Jakarta Governor Ali Sadikin on 21 April 1970, before fully operational a year later. The construction involved investments from Australia. The venue saw its golden years in the 1990s, but later lost its prominence in the late 2000s and some of the amenities had left abandoned since the venue was submerged by the annual flood, especially in 2007.

In mid-2016, the racecourse was closed for revitalization as Jakarta was about to co-host the 2018 Asian Games with Palembang. It first drew criticisms over the demolition and relocation of the surrounding settlements, many of whom were equestrian athletes. Revitalization took place from March until November 2017. On 2 August 2018, then Governor Anies Baswedan inaugurated the new racecourse under the name "Jakarta International Equestrian Park" ahead of the games' equestrian events.
