= Roller speed skating at the 2018 Asian Games – Men's 20000 metres elimination =

Men's 20000 metres elimination at the 2018 Asian Games
- Venue: Jakabaring Sport City
- Date: 31 August 2018
- Competitors: 17 from 9 nations

Medalists
gold medal	Chao Tsu-cheng	Chinese Taipei
silver medal	Choi Gwang-ho	South Korea
bronze medal	Son Geun-seong	South Korea

The men's 20000 metres elimination competition at the 2018 Asian Games took place on 31 August 2018 at the JSC Rollerskate Circuit.

== Schedule ==
All times are Western Indonesia Time (UTC+07:00)

Date	Time	Event
Friday, 31 August 2018	14:00	Final

== Results ==
Legend

- DNF — Did not finish
- EL — Eliminated

Rank	Athlete	Time
1st place, gold medalist(s)	Chao Tsu-cheng (TPE)	33:51.418
2nd place, silver medalist(s)	Choi Gwang-ho (KOR)	33:51.653
3rd place, bronze medalist(s)	Son Geun-seong (KOR)	33:51.967
4	Lin Ping-hung (TPE)	33:52.049
5	Chen Tao (CHN)	33:52.570
6	Tong Jiajun (CHN)	33:52.792
7	Oky Andrianto (INA)	33:55.981
8	Amitesh Mishra (IND)	34:00.957
9	Noppron Choochorngamket (THA)	EL
10	Tias Andira (INA)	EL
—	Harshveer Sekhon (IND)	DNF
—	Mohd Hazim Shahrum (MAS)	DNF
—	Phatcharawee Nijun (THA)	DNF
—	Yalaltyn Zorigtbaatar (MGL)	DNF
—	Baadain Tulga (MGL)	DNF
—	Lasantha Pramuditha Silva (SRI)	DNF
—	Kavindu Dilshan Perera (SRI)	DNF
