= Chinese Taipei at the 2018 Asian Games =

- IOC code: TPE
- NOC: Chinese Taipei Olympic Committee
- Website: www.tpenoc.net

in Jakarta and Palembang August 18 – September 2
- Competitors: 588 in 45 sports
- Flag bearer: Kuo Hsing-chun
- Medals Ranked 7th: Gold 17 Silver 19 Bronze 31 Total 67

Asian Games appearances (overview)
- 1954; 1958; 1962; 1966; 1970; 1974–1986; 1990; 1994; 1998; 2002; 2006; 2010; 2014; 2018; 2022; 2026

Chinese Taipei, representing the Republic of China (Taiwan), competed at the 2018 Asian Games in Jakarta and Palembang, Indonesia, from 18 August to 2 September 2018. At the last Games in Incheon, the country bagged a total 51 medals, including 10 gold, 18 silver, and 23 bronze. This time, Chinese Taipei is set to send a 738-strong team to compete in 36 of 40 sporting events, including 588 athletes.

== Competitors ==
The following is a list of the number of competitors representing Chinese Taipei that will participate at the Games:

Sport	Men	Women	Total
Archery	8	8	16
Athletics	20	11	31
Badminton	10	10	20
Baseball	24	—	24
Basketball	12	12	24
3-on-3 basketball	4	4	8
Bowling	6	6	12
Boxing	3	3	6
Bridge	9	9	18
Canoeing	18	24	42
Cycling	5	4	9
Equestrian	1	7	8
Fencing	4	4	8
Field hockey	0	18	18
Football	20	20	40
Golf	4	3	7
Gymnastics	5	5	10
Handball	16	0	16
Judo	6	6	12
Ju-jitsu	2	1	3
Kabaddi	0	12	12
Karate	4	4	8
Kurash	5	6	11
Paragliding	5	0	5
Roller Sports	3	3	6
Rowing	2	7	9
Rugby sevens	12	0	12
Sailing	1	0	1
Sambo	1	0	1
Shooting	6	7	13
Softball	–	17	17
Soft tennis	5	5	10
Sport climbing	0	1	1
Swimming	13	3	16
Table tennis	5	5	10
Taekwondo	6	6	12
Tennis	9	9	18
Triathlon	3	3	18
Wushu	5	5	10
Volleyball	14	14	28
Beach volleyball	4	4	8
Weightlifting	5	5	10
Wrestling	3	3	6
Demonstration Games
Canoe polo	6	6	12
Electronic sports	13	0	13
Total	307	280	587

== Medalists ==
The following Chinese Taipei competitors won medals at the Games.

=== Main event ===
Medal	Name	Sport	Event	Date
Gold	Luo Wei-min; Tang Chih-chun; Wei Chun-heng	Archery	Men's team recurve	27 August
Gold	Chen Yi-hsuan; Pan Yu-ping	Archery	Mixed team compound	27 August
Gold	Lee Chih-kai	Artistic gymnastics	Men's pommel horse	23 August
Gold	Tang Chia-hung	Artistic gymnastics	Men's horizontal bar	24 August
Gold	Tai Tzu-ying	Badminton	Women's singles	28 August
Gold	Yin Wan-ting; Wu Wei-min; Wu Chun-chieh; Wu Chen-po; Tuan Yen-yu; Lin Sheng-ru; Lin Min-hao; Ho Chia-lin; Chuang Ying-chieh; Chou En-ping; Chou Chih-wei; Chien Cheng-yen; Chen Chou Yueh-hung; Chen Yu-an; Chen Tzu-hsien; Chang Sheng-huang	Canoeing	Men's TBR-12 500 metres	26 August
Gold	Yin Wan-ting; Wu Wei-min; Wu Chun-chieh; Wu Chen-po; Tuan Yen-yu; Lin Sheng-ru; Lin Min-hao; Ho Chia-lin; Chuang Ying-chieh; Chou En-ping; Chou Chih-wei; Chien Cheng-yen; Chen Chou Yueh-hung; Chen Yu-an; Chen Tzu-hsien; Chang Sheng-huang	Canoeing	Men's TBR-12 1000 metres	27 August
Gold	Yang Hsin-lung; Liu Yi-zu	Contract bridge	Mixed pair	1 September
Gold	Wen Tzu-yun	Karate	Women's 55 kg	26 August
Gold	Gu Shiau-shuang	Karate	Women's 50 kg	27 August
Gold	Lin Ying-shin; Lu Shao-chuan	Shooting	Mixed 10 metre air rifle team	19 August
Gold	Yang Kun-pi	Shooting	Men's trap	20 August
Gold	Yu Kai-wen; Cheng Chu-ling	Soft tennis	Mixed doubles	30 August
Gold	Chao Tsu-cheng	Roller sports	Men's 20000 metres elimination	31 August
Gold	Li Meng-chu	Roller sports	Women's 20000 metres elimination	31 August
Gold	Su Po-ya	Taekwondo	Women's 53 kg	20 August
Gold	Kuo Hsing-chun	Weightlifting	Women's 58 kg	23 August
Silver	Chen Kuei-ru	Athletics	Men's 110 metres hurdles	28 August
Silver	Yang Chun-han	Athletics	Men's 200 metres	29 August
Silver	Lei Chien-ying; Peng Chia-mao; Tan Ya-ting	Archery	Women's team recurve	27 August
Silver	Tang Chia-hung	Artistic gymnastics	Men's floor	23 August
Silver	Chou Tien-chen	Badminton	Men's singles	28 August
Silver	Chou Chia-chen; Pan Yu-fen; Tsai Hsin-yi	Bowling	Women's trios	22 August
Silver	Chen Wei-han	Canoeing	Women's slalom C-1	23 August
Silver	Yin Wan-ting; Wu Wei-min; Wu Chun-chieh; Wu Chen-po; Tuan Yen-yu; Lin Sheng-ru; Lin Min-hao; Ho Chia-lin; Chuang Ying-chieh; Chou En-ping; Chien Cheng-yen; Chen Chou Yueh-hung; Chen Yuan; Chen Tzu-hsien; Chang Sheng-huang	Canoeing	Men's TBR-12 200 metres	25 August
Silver	Wu Yu-fang; Tsai Wen-chuan	Contract bridge	Women's pair	1 September
Silver	Fan Kang-wei; Tsai Po-ya	Contract bridge	Mixed pair	1 September
Silver	Chiang Sheng-shan	Cycling	Men's downhill	20 August
Silver	Huang Ting-ying	Cycling	Women's omnium	29 August
Silver	Wang Yi-ta	Karate	Men's individual kata	25 August
Silver	Huang Yi-ting	Rowing	Women's single sculls	23 August
Silver	Lin Yi-chun; Yang Kun-pi	Shooting	Mixed trap	21 August
Silver	Lin Su-hua; Chiu An-ju; Lin Ying-hsin; Tsai Chia-chen; Tu Ya-ting; Li Szu-shih; Lin Chih-ying; Lin Pei-chun; Yang Yi-ting; Shih Ching-ping; Lin Feng-chen; Su Yi-hsuan; Lai Meng-ting; Chen Miao-yi; Chen Chia-yi; Yen Yi	Softball	Women's tournament	24 August
Silver	Cheng Chu-ling	Soft tennis	Women's singles	29 August
Silver	Chan Hao-ching; Latisha Chan	Tennis	Women's doubles	25 August
Silver	Hung Wan-ting	Weightlifting	Women's 69 kg	25 August
Bronze	Chen Li-ju; Chen Yi-hsuan; Lin Ming-ching	Archery	Women's team compound	28 August
Bronze	Chen Chih-yu	Artistic gymnastics	Men's rings	23 August
Bronze	Chen Hung-ling; Chou Tien-chen; Hsu Jen-hao; Lee Jhe-huei; Lee Yang; Lu Ching-yao; Wang Chi-lin; Wang Tzu-wei; Yang Chih-chieh; Yang Po-han	Badminton	Men's team	21 August
Bronze	Lee Jhe-huei; Lee Yang	Badminton	Men's doubles	27 August
Bronze	Chen Bo-hao; Huabg Chien-lung; Lin Cheng-hsien; Lin Hua-ching; Lin Yuh-siang; Tang Chia-chun; Wang Cheng-hao; Wang Tsung-hao; Wang Wei-chung; Wang Yu-pu; Wu Sheng-feng; Chen Jui-mu; Huang Chia-wei; Lin Tzu-chieh; Hsiao Po-ting; Lin Chen-fei; Lin Chia-yu; Lin Han; Chen Wei-chih; Shen Hao-wei; Chen Hsiao-yun; Chan Tzu-hsien; Su Chih-chieh; Tai Ju-liang	Baseball	Men's tournament	1 September
Bronze	Chang Yu-hsuan; Pan Yu-fan; Chou Chia-chen; Tsai Hsin-yi; Huang Chiung-yao; Wang Ya-ting	Bowling	Women's team of six	24 August
Bronze	Wu Hao-ming; Chen Hsi-nan; Hung Kun-yi; Chen Ming-tang; Lin Pai-feng; Hsieh Chin-liang	Bowling	Men's team of six	25 August
Bronze	Huang Hsiao-wen	Boxing	Women's 57 kg	31 August
Bronze	Lin Yu-ting	Boxing	Women's 51 kg	31 August
Bronze	Chang Chu-han	Canoeing	Women's slalom K-1	22 August
Bronze	Huang Ting-ying	Cycling	Women's pursuit	30 August
Bronze	So Ho-yee; Liu Pei-hua; Chen Yin-shou; Lin Yin-yu; Wang Shao-yu; Liu ming-chien	Contract bridge	Supermixed team	26 August
Bronze	Yang Yung-wei	Judo	Men's 60 kg	29 August
Bronze	Lien Chen-ling	Judo	Women's 57 kg	30 August
Bronze	Feng Hsiu-chen; Wu Yu-jung; Hu Yu-chen; Chen Yung-ting; Lin I-min; Yen Chiao-wen; Liao Yu-tzu; Huang Ssu-chin; Lin Yu-fen; Qin Pei-jyun; Chuang Ya-han; Huang Yi-yun	Kabaddi	Women's tournament	23 August
Bronze	Hsu Wei-chun	Karate	Men's 75 kg	27 August
Bronze	Wu Chun-wei	Karate	Men's 84 kg	27 August
Bronze	Chan Hao-cheng	Kurash	Men's 66 kg	28 August
Bronze	Yang Hsien-tzu	Kurash	Women's 78 kg	30 August
Bronze	Yang Ho-chen	Roller sports	Women's 20000 metres elimination	31 August
Bronze	Lu Shao-chuan	Shooting	Men's 10 metre air rifle	20 August
Bronze	Chen Tsung-wen; Chen Yu-hsun; Kuo Chien-chun; Lin Wei-chieh; Yu Kai-wen	Soft tennis	Men's team	1 September
Bronze	Chan Chia-hsin; Cheng Chu-ling; Huang Shih-yuan; Kuo Chien-chi; Lee Ching-wen	Soft tennis	Women's team	1 September
Bronze	Chuang Chih-yuan; Chen Chie-nan; Lin Yun-ju	Table tennis	Men's team	28 August
Bronze	Chen Ching	Taekwondo	Men's individual poomsae	19 August
Bronze	Chen Hsiang-ting; Chen Yi-hsuan; Lin Kan-yu	Taekwondo	Women's team poomsae	19 August
Bronze	Ho Chia-hsin	Taekwondo	Men's 63 kg	22 August
Bronze	Liang En-shuo	Tennis	Women's singles	23 August
Bronze	Chang Li-yun; Lee Tzu-ying; Chang Yu-chia; Huang Ching-hsuan; Huang Hsin-yu; Hsieh Yi-chen; Yang Meng-hua; Kuo Ching-yi; Tseng Wan-ling; Lee Yu; Chen Tzu-ya; Hsiao Hsiang-ling; Lai Xiang-chen; Chen Hsi	Volleyball	Men's tournament	31 August
Bronze	Tsai Tse-min	Wushu	Men's changquan	19 August
Bronze	Chen Wei-ting	Wushu	Women's 52 kg	22 August

Medals by sport
Sport	1st place, gold medalist(s)	2nd place, silver medalist(s)	3rd place, bronze medalist(s)	Total	Rank
Canoeing	2	2	1	5	3
Karate	2	1	2	5	3
Archery	2	1	1	4	2
Artistic gymnastics	2	1	1	4	2
Shooting	2	1	1	4	4
Roller sports	2	0	1	3	2
Contract bridge	1	2	1	4	2
Badminton	1	1	2	4	4
Soft tennis	1	1	0	2	3
Weightlifting	1	1	0	2	5
Taekwondo	1	0	3	4	6
Cycling	0	2	1	3	9
Athletics	0	2	0	2	14
Bowling	0	1	2	3	4
Tennis	0	1	1	2	6
Rowing	0	1	0	1	10
Softball	0	1	0	1	2
Boxing	0	0	2	2	10
Judo	0	0	2	2	11
Kurash	0	0	2	2	6
Soft tennis	0	0	2	2	3
Wushu	0	0	2	2	11
Baseball	0	0	1	1	3
Kabaddi	0	0	1	1	4
Table tennis	0	0	1	1	6
Volleyball	0	0	1	1	8
Total	17	19	31	67	7

Medals by day
Day	Date	1st place, gold medalist(s)	2nd place, silver medalist(s)	3rd place, bronze medalist(s)	Total
1	August 19	1	0	3	4
2	August 20	2	1	1	4
3	August 21	0	1	1	2
4	August 22	0	1	3	4
5	August 23	2	3	3	8
6	August 24	1	1	1	3
7	August 25	0	4	1	5
8	August 26	2	0	1	3
9	August 27	4	1	3	8
10	August 28	1	2	3	6
11	August 29	0	3	1	4
12	August 30	1	0	3	4
13	August 31	2	0	4	6
14	September 1	1	2	3	6
15	September 2	0	0	0	0
Total		17	19	31	67

=== Demonstration event ===
Medal	Name	ID	Sport	Event	Date
Silver	Chiu Po-yen; Cheng Ming-jen; Cheng Yu-hsiang; Huang Chien-wei; Lin Chun-ting; Yen Hao-che; Chen Po-cheng	S.T PoChu; S.T Lover; MS Soar; MS Wei; S.T Ting ahq Fanta; MAD OM	eSports	Arena of Valor	26 August
Silver	Huang Yu-hsiang	Nice	eSports	StarCraft II	30 August
Bronze	Chen Ju-chih; Chen Kuan-ting; Hsieh Yu-ting; Wang You-chun; Chen Kuan-ting; Huang Yi-tang; Lu Yu-hung; Hu Shuo-chieh	WaHorse; REFRA1N; PK baybay Morning; Maple; Betty; SwordArT	eSports	League of Leganeds	28 August
Bronze	Li Yung-hsu; Wu Tung-yang; Chao Tzu-hsing; Chien Shao-hung; Huang Teng-hui; Hsiao Wei-chen	—N/a	Canoe polo	Men's tournament	29 August
Bronze	Chien Chi-yun; Fu Yu-ting; Liao Wan-ju; Hung Yi-fang; Tsai An-chi; Li Heng-yen	—N/a	Canoe polo	Women's tournament	29 August

Medals by sport
Sport	1st place, gold medalist(s)	2nd place, silver medalist(s)	3rd place, bronze medalist(s)	Total	Rank
eSports	0	2	1	3	4
Canoe polo	0	0	2	2	5
Total	0	2	3	5	7

Medals by day
Day	Date	1st place, gold medalist(s)	2nd place, silver medalist(s)	3rd place, bronze medalist(s)	Total
8	August 26	0	1	0	1
9	August 27	0	0	0	0
10	August 28	0	0	1	1
11	August 29	0	0	2	2
Total		0	2	3	7

== Archery ==
Recurve

Athlete	Event	Ranking Round		Round of 32	Round of 16	Round of 8	Quarterfinals	Semifinals	Finals / BM	Rank
Athlete	Event	Score	Rank	Round of 32	Round of 16	Round of 8	Quarterfinals	Semifinals	Finals / BM	Rank
Wei Chun-heng	Men's individual	667	10	Bye	Mahamadaachchi Sajeev de Silva (SRI); W 6–2	Xu Tianyu (CHN); W 6–2	Lee Woo-seok (KOR); L 2–6	Did not advance		
Tang Chih-chun	Men's individual	670	7	Bye	Htike Lin Oo (MYA); L 1–7	Did not advance				
Jao ting-yu	Men's individual	645	33	Did not advance						
Luo Wei-min	Men's individual	649	27	Did not advance						
Luo Wei-min; Tang Chih-chun; Wei Chun-heng	Men's team	1986	3	—N/a	Bye	Nepal; W 6–0	Japan; W 6–0	Mongolia; W 6–0	South Korea; W 5–3	1st place, gold medalist(s)
Lei Chien-ying	Women's individual	674	4	Bye	Firuza Zubaydova (TJK); W 6–0	Deepika Kumari (IND); W 7–3	Tomomi Sugimoto (JPN); W 6–0	Diananda Choirunisa (INA); L 3–7	Bronze medal match Kang Chae-young (KOR); L 4–6	4
Tan Ya-ting	Women's individual	672	6	Bye	Ada Lam Shuk Ching (HKG); W 6–0	Kaori Kawanaka (JPN); W 7–1	Zhang Xinyan (CHN); L 4–6	Did not advance		
Peng Chia-mao	Women's individual	664	8	Did not advance						
Lo Hsiao-yuan	Women's individual	510	63	Did not advance						
Lei Chien-ying; Peng Chia-mao; Tan Ya-ting	Women's team	2010	2	—N/a		Bye	India; W 6–2	China; W 5–3	South Korea; L 3–5	2nd place, silver medalist(s)
Lei Chien-ying; Tang Chih-chun	Mixed team	1344	2	—N/a	Bye	Thailand; W 5–4	North Korea; L 4–5	Did not advance		

Compound

Athlete	Event	Ranking Round		Round of 32	Round of 16	Round of 8	Quarterfinals	Semifinals	Finals / BM	Rank
Athlete	Event	Score	Seed	Round of 32	Round of 16	Round of 8	Quarterfinals	Semifinals	Finals / BM	Rank
Lin Che-wei; Lin Hsin-min; Pan Yu-pin	Men's team	2084	3	—N/a		Singapore; W 230–224	Kazakhstan; W 232–227	India; L 227–231	Bronze medal match Malaysia; L 223–225	4
Chen Li-ju; Chen Yi-hsuan; Lin Ming-ching	Women's team	2085	3	—N/a		Bye	Malaysia; W 221–225	India; L 222–225	Bronze medal match Iran; W 226–221	3rd place, bronze medalist(s)
Chen Yi-hsuan; Pan Yu-ping	Mixed team	1406	3	—N/a	Bye	Myanmar; W 156–148	Kazakhstan; W 151−149	Iran; W 153−138	South Korea; W 151–150	1st place, gold medalist(s)

== Athletics ==
=== Road & track events ===
Men's

Athlete	Event	Round 1			Semifinal			Final	
Athlete	Event	Heat	Time	Rank	Heat	Time	Rank	Time	Rank
Yang Chun-han	100 m	4	10.13	1 Q	3	10.17	2 Q	10.17	5
Wang Wei-hsu	100 m	4	10.55	3 Q	1	10.46	5	Did not advance	
Yang Chun-han	200 m	1	20.95	1 Q	2	20.53	2 Q	20.23	(silver) PB
Wei Tai-sheng	200 m	2	21.25	4 q	1	21.27	5	Did not advance	
Yang Lung-hsiang	400 m	3	47.49	4 Q	3	47.37	4	Did not advance	
Chen Kuei-ru	110 m hurdles	3	13.63	2 Q	—N/a			13.39	(silver) PB
Yang Wei-ting	110 m hurdles	2	13.86	2 Q	—N/a			13.75	8
Chen Chieh	400 m hurdles	—N/a			2	50.30	1 Q	49.62	4
Yu Chia-hsuan	400 m hurdles	—N/a			3	50.84	4	Did not advance	
Wei Yi-ching; Yang Chun-han; Wei Tai-sheng; Wang Wei-hsu	4 × 100 m relay	2	39.15	2 Q	—N/a			38.98	4 SB
Yu Chia-hsuan; Chen Chieh; Yu Chen-yi; Yang Lung-hsiang	4 × 400 m relay	2	3:08.76	5	—N/a			Did not advance	

Women's

Athlete	Event	Round 1			Semifinal			Final	
Athlete	Event	Heat	Time	Rank	Heat	Time	Rank	Time	Rank
Liao Yan-jun	100 m	1	11.82	2 Q	2	11.71	3	Did not advance	
Chen Wan-mei	100 m	4	12.08	8	Did not advance				
Hsieh Hsi-en	100 m hurdles	2	13.75	3 q	—N/a			13.92	8
Liao Ching-hsien; Liao Yan-jun; Hu Chia-chen; Chen Wan-mei	4 × 100 m relay	1	45.17	3 Q	—N/a			45.19	6

=== Field events ===
Men's

Athlete	Event	Qualification		Final	
Athlete	Event	Result	Rank	Result	Rank
Lin Tzu-chi	Long jump	7.60	9 q	7.61	10
Lin Hung-min	Long jump	7.54	12 q	7.53	11
Lee Kuei-lung	Triple jump	—N/a		16.05	9
Hsiang Chun-hsien	High jump	2.15	7 q	NM	–
Chang Ming-huang	Shot put	—N/a		18.98	5 SB
Cheng Chao-tsun	Javelin throw	—N/a		79.81	5
Huang Shih-feng	Javelin throw	—N/a		73.86	9

Women's

Athlete	Event	Qualification		Final	
Athlete	Event	Result	Rank	Result	Rank
Tsai Ching-jung	High jump	—N/a		1.75	=9
Shen Yi-ju	Pole vault	—N/a		4.10	4 PB
Wu Chia-ju	Pole vault	—N/a		3.70	5
Lin Chia-ying	Shot put	—N/a		16.30	4
Li Hui-jun	Javelin throw	—N/a		54.83	5

=== Combined ===
Women

Athlete	Event	100m H	HJ	SP	200m	LJ	JT	800m	Total	Rank
Chu Chia-ling	Heptathlon	13.95; 985	1.64; 783	11.82; 649	26.02; 795	5.78; 783	42.74; 720	2:27.70; 722	5437	8 SB

== Badminton ==
=== Men ===
Athlete	Event	Round of 64	Round of 32	Round of 16	Quarterfinals	Semifinals	Final / BM	
Athlete	Event	Opposition Score	Opposition Score	Opposition Score	Opposition Score	Opposition Score	Opposition Score	Rank
Chou Tien-chen	Singles	Bye	Phạm Cao Cường (VIE); W 21–16, 21–12	Kantaphon Wangcharoen (THA); W 21–18, 13–21, 21–11	Ng Ka Long (HKG); W 21–18, 21–18	Anthony Sinisuka Ginting (INA); W 16–21, 23–21, 21–17	Jonatan Christie (INA); L 18–21, 22–20, 15–21	2nd place, silver medalist(s)
Wang Tzu-wei	Singles	Bye	Nguyễn Tiến Minh (VIE); W 24–22, 21–17	Wong Wing Ki (HKG); L 12–21, 21–16, 13–21	Did not advance			
Chen Hung-ling; Wang Chi-lin	Doubles	—N/a	Kim Won-ho / Seo Seung-jae (KOR); L 12–21, 21–15, 17–21	Did not advance				
Lee Jhe-huei; Lee Yang	Doubles	—N/a	Sarim Mohamed / Hussein Zayan Shaheed (MDV); W 21–4, 21–7	Liu Cheng / Zhang Nan (CHN); W 20–22, 21–16, 21–16	Choi Sol-gyu / Kang Min-hyuk (KOR); W 21–16, 21–16	Marcus Fernaldi Gideon / Kevin Sanjaya Sukamuljo (INA); L 15–21, 22–20, 12–21	Did not advance	3rd place, bronze medalist(s)
Chen Hung-ling; Chou Tien-chen; Hsu Jen-hao; Lee Jhe-huei; Lee Yang; Lu Ching-yao; Wang Chi-lin; Wang Tzu-wei; Yang Chih-chieh; Yang Po-han	Team	—N/a		Bye	Nepal; W 3–0	China; L 1–3	Did not advance	3rd place, bronze medalist(s)

=== Women ===
Athlete	Event	Round of 32	Round of 16	Quarterfinals	Semifinals	Final / BM	
Athlete	Event	Opposition Score	Opposition Score	Opposition Score	Opposition Score	Opposition Score	Rank
Tai Tzu-ying	Singles	Bye	Cheung Ngan Yi (HKG); W 21–9, 21–14	Nozomi Okuhara (JPN); W 21–15, 21–10	Saina Nehwal (IND); W 21–17, 21–14	P. V. Sindhu (IND); W 21–13, 21–16	1st place, gold medalist(s)
Pai Yu-po	Singles	Nitchaon Jindapol (THA); L 15−21, 20−22	Did not advance				
Hsu Ya-ching; Wu Ti-jung	Doubles	Gong Xue Xin / Ng Weng Chi (MAC); W 21–5, 21–12	Tang Jinhua / Zheng Yu (CHN); L 17−21, 14−21	Did not advance			
Chen Hsiao-huan; Hu Ling-fang	Doubles	Chow Mei Kuan / Lee Meng Yean (MAS); L 13–21, 14–21	Did not advance				
Chen Hsiao-huan; Chiang Ying-li; Hsu Ya-ching; Hu Ling-fang; Kuo Yu-wen; Lee Chia-hsin; Lin Wan-ching; Pai Yu-po; Tai Tzu-ying; Wu Ti-jung	Team	—N/a	Pakistan; W 3–0	Thailand; L 0–3	Did not advance		

=== Mixed ===
Athlete	Event	Round of 32	Round of 16	Quarterfinals	Semifinals	Final / BM	
Athlete	Event	Opposition Score	Opposition Score	Opposition Score	Opposition Score	Opposition Score	Rank
Wang Chi-lin; Lee Chia-hsin	Doubles	Goh Soon Huat / Shevon Jemie Lai (MAS); L 12–21, 16–21	Did not advance				
Lee Yang; Hsu Ya-ching	Doubles	Nipitphon Phuangphuapet / Puttita Supajirakul (THA); W 21–17, 22–20	Zheng Siwei / Huang Yaqiong (CHN); L 19–21, 16–21	Did not advance			

== Baseball ==
Summary

Team	Event	Round 1		Round 2		Super / Consolation		Final / BM	
Team	Event	Oppositions Scores	Rank	Oppositions Scores	Rank	Oppositions Scores	Rank	Opposition Score	Rank
Chinese Taipei men's	Men's tournament	Bye		South Korea: W 2–1; Hong Kong: W 16–1 (F/5); Indonesia: W 15–0 (F/7)	1 Q	China: W 1–0; Japan: L 0–5	3	China; W 10–0	3rd place, bronze medalist(s)

Roster

The following is the Chinese Taipei roster for the men's baseball tournament of the 2018 Asian Games.

Manager
Tsu Shun-i

Pos.	No.	Player	Date of birth (age)	Bats	Throws	Club
	1	Lin Tzu-chieh	13 May 1991 (aged 27)			(Chinese Taipei) CO-Bank
IF	7	Hsiao Po-ting	20 August 1989 (aged 29)			(Chinese Taipei) Taipower
C	8	Chen Jui-mu	12 February 1986 (aged 32)			(Chinese Taipei) Taipower
IF	10	Lin Han	24 January 1985 (aged 33)			(Chinese Taipei) CO-Bank
IF	11	Lin Chen-fei	8 April 1997 (aged 21)			(Chinese Taipei) Lamigo
OF	15	Tai Ju-liang	6 February 1992 (aged 26)			(Chinese Taipei) CO-Bank
	17	Lin Chia-yu	28 March 1982 (aged 36)			(Chinese Taipei) CO-Bank
P	18	Wu Sheng-feng	28 July 1987 (aged 31)			(Chinese Taipei) CO-Bank
P	21	Lin Hua-ching	3 October 1994 (aged 23)			(Chinese Taipei) Lamigo
P	28	Tang Chia-chun	21 December 1984 (aged 33)			
P	29	Wang Yu-pu	18 January 1996 (aged 22)			(Chinese Taipei) Uni Lions
OF	33	Shen Hao-wei	12 September 1997 (aged 20)			(Chinese Taipei) Fubon
P	37	Tsai Wei-fan	27 April 1993 (aged 25)			
OF	39	Chan Tzu-hsien	24 February 1994 (aged 24)			(Chinese Taipei) Brothers
C	49	Huang Chia-wei	5 February 1986 (aged 32)			(Chinese Taipei) CO-Bank
P	55	Wang Tsung-hao	27 August 1990 (aged 27)			(Chinese Taipei) Taipower
IF	60	Chiang Chien-ming	27 May 1985 (aged 33)			
IF	62	Chen Wei-chih	23 September 1988 (aged 29)			(Chinese Taipei) Taipower
P	66	Lin Yu-hsiang	23 February 1988 (aged 30)			(Chinese Taipei) Taipei City
P	70	Wang Cheng-hao	25 September 1989 (aged 28)			(Chinese Taipei) CO-Bank
OF	75	Chen Hsiao-yun	9 September 1993 (aged 24)			(Chinese Taipei) CO-Bank
P	83	Chen Bo-hao	28 January 1999 (aged 19)			(Chinese Taipei) Brothers
P	91	Lin Cheng-hsien	13 September 1995 (aged 22)			(Chinese Taipei) Fubon
P	92	Huang Chien-lung	10 October 1986 (aged 31)			(Chinese Taipei) CO-Bank

Round 2 – Group B

Pos	Team	Pld	W	L	RF	RA	PCT	GB	Qualification
1	Chinese Taipei	3	3	0	33	2	1.000	—	Super round
2	South Korea	3	2	1	37	5	.667	1	Super round
3	Hong Kong	3	1	2	11	41	.333	2	Consolation round
4	Indonesia	3	0	3	4	37	.000	3	Consolation round

Source: OCA

26 August; 18:30	South Korea	1–2	Chinese Taipei	Gelora Bung Karno Baseball Field, Jakarta; Attendance: 1,750; Umpires: Tomohisa Yamaguchi (JPN)
26 August; 18:30	LP: Yang Hyeon-jong	Boxscore	WP: Wu Sheng-feng; Sv: Wang Cheng-hao	Gelora Bung Karno Baseball Field, Jakarta; Attendance: 1,750; Umpires: Tomohisa Yamaguchi (JPN)
26 August; 18:30	HR: Kim Jae-hwan (1)	Boxscore	HR: Lin Chia-yu (1)	Gelora Bung Karno Baseball Field, Jakarta; Attendance: 1,750; Umpires: Tomohisa Yamaguchi (JPN)

Team	1	2	3	4	5	6	7	8	9	R	H	E
Chinese Taipei	2	0	0	0	0	0	0	0	0	2	5	0
South Korea	0	0	0	1	0	0	0	0	0	1	6	0

27 August; 12:00	Chinese Taipei	16–1 (F/5)	Hong Kong	Gelora Bung Karno Baseball Field, Jakarta; Attendance: 100; Umpires: Park Hi-young (KOR)
27 August; 12:00	WP: Lin Cheng-hsien	Boxscore	LP: Leung Chung Hei	Gelora Bung Karno Baseball Field, Jakarta; Attendance: 100; Umpires: Park Hi-young (KOR)

Team	1	2	3	4	5	6	7	8	9	R	H	E
Hong Kong	0	0	0	1	0	—	—	—	—	1	2	0
Chinese Taipei	0	2	8	3	3	—	—	—	—	16	17	0

28 August; 18:30	Indonesia	0–15 (F/7)	Chinese Taipei	Gelora Bung Karno Baseball Field, Jakarta; Attendance: 750; Umpires: Katsutoshi Takahashi (JPN)
28 August; 18:30	LP: Chindy Patria Yudharana	Boxscore	WP: Huang Chien-lung	Gelora Bung Karno Baseball Field, Jakarta; Attendance: 750; Umpires: Katsutoshi Takahashi (JPN)

Team	1	2	3	4	5	6	7	8	9	R	H	E
Chinese Taipei	6	0	1	1	0	5	2	—	—	15	14	0
Indonesia	0	0	0	0	0	0	0	—	—	0	2	1

Super Round

Pos	Team	Pld	W	L	RF	RA	PCT	GB	Qualification
1	South Korea	3	2	1	16	4	.667 (Note: Tied on head-to-head wins (1). Team quality balance: KOR +0.167, JPN +0.056, TPE −0.222.)	—	Gold medal match
2	Japan	3	2	1	23	7	.667	—	Gold medal match
3	Chinese Taipei	3	2	1	3	6	.667	—	Bronze medal match
4	China	3	0	3	3	28	.000	2	Bronze medal match

Source: OCA
Notes:

30 August; 18:30	Chinese Taipei	1–0	China	Gelora Bung Karno Baseball Field, Jakarta; Attendance: 412; Umpires: Tomohisa Yamaguchi (JPN)
30 August; 18:30	WP: Huang Chien-lung; Sv: Wang Cheng-hao	Boxscore	LP: Gan Quan	Gelora Bung Karno Baseball Field, Jakarta; Attendance: 412; Umpires: Tomohisa Yamaguchi (JPN)

Team	1	2	3	4	5	6	7	8	9	R	H	E
China	0	0	0	0	0	0	0	0	0	0	6	1
Chinese Taipei	0	0	0	0	0	1	0	0	X	1	6	0

31 August; 18:30	Chinese Taipei	0–5	Japan	Gelora Bung Karno Baseball Field, Jakarta; Attendance: 500; Umpires: Park Hi-young (KOR)
31 August; 18:30	LP: Lin Hua-ching	Boxscore	WP: Yuichiro Okano; Sv: Yudai Aranishi	Gelora Bung Karno Baseball Field, Jakarta; Attendance: 500; Umpires: Park Hi-young (KOR)
31 August; 18:30		Boxscore	HR: Tsuyoshi Tamura (1)	Gelora Bung Karno Baseball Field, Jakarta; Attendance: 500; Umpires: Park Hi-young (KOR)

Team	1	2	3	4	5	6	7	8	9	R	H	E
Japan	0	2	0	0	0	1	1	1	0	5	7	0
Chinese Taipei	0	0	0	0	0	0	0	0	0	0	7	2

Bronze medal match

1 September; 11:00	Chinese Taipei	10–0 (F/8)	China	Gelora Bung Karno Baseball Field, Jakarta; Attendance: 850; Umpires: Tomohisa Yamaguchi (JPN)
1 September; 11:00	WP: Wang Tsung-hao	Boxscore	LP: Meng Weiqiang	Gelora Bung Karno Baseball Field, Jakarta; Attendance: 850; Umpires: Tomohisa Yamaguchi (JPN)
1 September; 11:00	HR: Chan Tzu-hsien (1)	Boxscore		Gelora Bung Karno Baseball Field, Jakarta; Attendance: 850; Umpires: Tomohisa Yamaguchi (JPN)

Team	1	2	3	4	5	6	7	8	9	R	H	E
China	0	0	0	0	0	0	0	0	—	0	2	2
Chinese Taipei	2	1	0	5	0	1	0	1	—	10	10	1

== Basketball ==
Summary

Team	Event	Group Stage					Quarterfinal	Semifinals / Pl.	Final / BM / Pl.	
Team	Event	Opposition Score	Opposition Score	Opposition Score	Opposition Score	Rank	Opposition Score	Opposition Score	Opposition Score	Rank
Chinese Taipei men's 5×5	Men's tournament	—N/a	Japan; W 71−65	Hong Kong; W 98–67	Qatar; W 83–70	1 Q	Syria; W 82–75	China; L 63–86	Bronze medal match South Korea; L 81–89	4
Chinese Taipei women's 5×5	Women's tournament	Kazakhstan; W 72−42	Korea; W 87−85 (OT)	India; W 84−61	Indonesia; W 115–51	1 Q	Mongolia; W 76–59	Korea; L 66–89	Bronze medal match Japan; L 63–76	4
Chinese Taipei men's 3×3	Men's 3x3 tournament	Mongolia; W 19–15	South Korea; L 20–18	Bangladesh; W 21–8	Kyrgyzstan; W 21–7	2 Q	Iran; L 17–18	did not advance		
Chinese Taipei women's 3×3	Women's 3x3 tournament	—N/a	Nepal; W 19–8	Japan; L 10–14	Mongolia; W 21–10	2 Q	South Korea; W 15–11	China; L 12–21	Bronze medal match Thailand; L 14–15	4

=== 5×5 basketball ===
Chinese Taipei team entered the competition and drawn in the group C for the men's team, and in the group X for the women's team.

==== Men's tournament ====
Roster

The following is the Chinese Taipei roster in the men's basketball tournament of the 2018 Asian Games.

Chinese Taipei men's national basketball team – 2018 Asian Games roster
Players
Coaches

Pos.	No.	Name	Age – Date of birth	Height	Club	Ctr.
G	0	Peng Chun-yen	28 – 5 December 1989	1.84 m (6 ft 0 in)	Bank of Taiwan	(Chinese Taipei)
G	1	Chou Yi-hsiang	27 – 4 February 1991	1.91 m (6 ft 3 in)	Xinjiang Flying Tigers	(China)
F	5	Liu Cheng	27 – 24 November 1990	1.92 m (6 ft 4 in)	Zhejiang Lions	(China)
F	8	Chou Po-chen	28 – 8 August 1990	1.98 m (6 ft 6 in)	Yulon Luxgen Dinos	(Chinese Taipei)
G	9	Chen Ying-chun (C)	25 – 9 June 1993	1.81 m (5 ft 11 in)	Guangzhou Long-Lions	(China)
F	10	Hu Long-mao	25 – 22 December 1992	1.96 m (6 ft 5 in)	Fujian Sturgeons	(China)
G	11	Huang Tsung-han	24 – 7 July 1994	1.93 m (6 ft 4 in)	Taiwan Beer	(Chinese Taipei)
G	14	Chiang Yu-an	27 – 4 August 1991	1.74 m (5 ft 9 in)	Taiwan Beer	(Chinese Taipei)
C	15	Chen Kuan-chuan	24 – 30 December 1993	1.97 m (6 ft 6 in)	Pauian Archiland	(Chinese Taipei)
C	16	Lin Chih-wei	26 – 10 July 1992	2.00 m (6 ft 7 in)	Fubon Braves	(Chinese Taipei)
F	21	Douglas Creighton (NP)	33 – 7 March 1985	1.97 m (6 ft 6 in)	Pauian Archiland	(Chinese Taipei)
G	27	Huang Jhen	28 – 27 June 1990	1.90 m (6 ft 3 in)	Dacin Tigers	(Chinese Taipei)

Head coach

- (United States) Charlie Parker

Legend

- (C) Team captain
- (NP) Naturalized player
- Club – describes last
  club before the tournament
- Age – describes age
  on 14 August 2018

Group C

Pos	Team	Pld	W	L	PF	PA	PD	Pts	Qualification
1	Chinese Taipei	3	3	0	252	202	+50	6	Quarterfinals
2	Japan	3	2	1	235	224	+11	5	Quarterfinals
3	Qatar	3	1	2	231	245	−14	4	
4	Hong Kong	3	0	3	229	276	−47	3	

Source: OCA

14 August
10:00

Chinese Taipei	71–65	Japan
Scoring by quarter: 11–17, 19–20, 29–16, 12–12
Pts: Chen Y. 18; Rebs: Liu 9 Asts: Chen Y. 5		Pts: Harimoto 12; Rebs: Sato 8 Asts: Vendrame 6

Gelora Bung Karno Basketball Hall, Jakarta
Referees: Harja Jaladri (INA), Alexey Stepanenko (KAZ), Preeda Muongmee (THA)

20 August
16:00

Chinese Taipei	98–67	Hong Kong
Scoring by quarter: 24–13, 21–10, 30–19, 23–25
Pts: Liu 21; Rebs: Liu 8 Asts: Chou Y. 5		Pts: Xu 16; Rebs: Szeto 8 Asts: Szeto 5

Gelora Bung Karno Basketball Hall, Jakarta
Referees: Harja Jaladri (INA), Yevgeniy Mikheyev (KAZ), Zhu Duan (CHN)

25 August
16:00

Qatar	70–83	Chinese Taipei
Scoring by quarter: 13–24, 22–15, 17–13, 18–31
Pts: Suliman, Al-Rayes 13; Rebs: Al-Rayes 9 Asts: Avdić 5		Pts: Chen Y. 20; Rebs: Chou P., Chen K. 8 Asts: Chen Y. 5

Gelora Bung Karno Basketball Hall, Jakarta
Referees: Harja Jaladri (INA), Yevgeniy Mikheyev (KAZ), Preeda Muongmee (THA)

Quarterfinal

27 August
16:00

Chinese Taipei	82–75	Syria
Scoring by quarter: 24–19, 17–22, 16–17, 25–17
Pts: Chen Y. 24; Rebs: Chou P. 7 Asts: Creighton 4		Pts: Al-Jabi 28; Rebs: Al-Hamwi 11; Asts: Al-Hamwi 5

Gelora Bung Karno Basketball Hall, Jakarta
Referees: Ferdinand Pascual (PHI), Kumiko Kumagai (JPN), Hadi Salem (IRI)

Semifinal

30 August
18:30

Chinese Taipei	63–86	China
Scoring by quarter: 19–26, 11–11, 12–31, 21–18
Pts: Liu 24; Rebs: Liu, Lin 5 Asts: Liu, Chen Y., Lin 2		Pts: Zhou 22; Rebs: Zhou 16; Asts: Sun 6

Istora Gelora Bung Karno, Jakarta
Referees: Harja Jaladri (INA), Imran Ali Baig (IND), Anan Daraghma (PLE)

Bronze medal match

1 September
12:30

South Korea	89–81	Chinese Taipei
Scoring by quarter: 21–11, 24–22, 27–20, 17–28
Pts: Ra 37; Rebs: Ra 17; Asts: Lee S. 15		Pts: Liu 25; Rebs: Liu 7 Asts: Chen Y. 7

Istora Gelora Bung Karno, Jakarta
Referees: Alexey Stepanenko (KAZ), Hadi Salem (IRI), Preeda Muongmee (THA)

==== Women's tournament ====
Roster

The following is the Chinese Taipei roster in the women's basketball tournament of the 2018 Asian Games.

Chinese Taipei women's national basketball team – 2018 Asian Games roster
Players
Coaches

Pos.	No.	Name	Age – Date of birth	Height	Club	Ctr.
G	1	Huang Ling-chuan	23 – 6 December 1994	1.75 m (5 ft 9 in)	Cathay Life	(Chinese Taipei)
F	3	Chen Yu-chun	31 – 7 March 1987	1.77 m (5 ft 10 in)	Cathay Life	(Chinese Taipei)
G	4	Chen Yen-yu	23 – 7 October 1994	1.69 m (5 ft 7 in)	Chunghwa Telecom	(Chinese Taipei)
G	5	Huang Fan-shan	30 – 29 September 1987	1.73 m (5 ft 8 in)	Cathay Life	(Chinese Taipei)
F	7	Wu Ying-chieh	25 – 3 November 1992	1.78 m (5 ft 10 in)	Taiyuan Textile	(Chinese Taipei)
G	8	Huang Ying-li	29 – 24 February 1989	1.70 m (5 ft 7 in)	Cathay Life	(Chinese Taipei)
F	9	Huang Ping-jen (C)	28 – 6 November 1989	1.78 m (5 ft 10 in)	Xinjiang Magic Deer	(China)
C	11	Wang Wei-lin	25 – 1 February 1993	1.80 m (5 ft 11 in)	Chunghwa Telecom	(Chinese Taipei)
F	13	Cheng I-hsiu	25 – 24 June 1993	1.78 m (5 ft 10 in)	Cathay Life	(Chinese Taipei)
C	17	Bao Hsi-le	27 – 7 November 1990	1.96 m (6 ft 5 in)	Ballarat Rush	(Australia)
G	23	Peng Szu-chin	26 – 9 November 1991	1.63 m (5 ft 4 in)	Xinjiang Magic Deer	(China)
G	27	Lin Yu-ting	24 – 25 January 1994	1.78 m (5 ft 10 in)	Cathay Life	(Chinese Taipei)

Head coach

- (United States) Albert Kenyon Wagner

Assistant coach(es)

- (Chinese Taipei) Cheng Hui-yun
- (Chinese Taipei) Lin Chi-wen

Legend

- (C) Team captain
- (NP) Naturalized player
- Club – describes last
  club before the tournament
- Age – describes age
  on 15 August 2018

Group X

Pos	Team	Pld	W	L	PF	PA	PD	Pts	Qualification
1	Chinese Taipei	4	4	0	358	239	+119	8	Quarterfinals
2	Korea	4	3	1	382	238	+144	7	Quarterfinals
3	Kazakhstan	4	2	2	263	291	−28	6	Quarterfinals
4	Indonesia	4	1	3	233	374	−141	5	Quarterfinals
5	India	4	0	4	242	336	−94	4	

Source: OCA

15 August
12:30

Kazakhstan	42–72	Chinese Taipei
Scoring by quarter: 6–16, 12–20, 11–19, 13–17
Pts: Kondrakova 11; Rebs: Kondrakova 12; Asts: Yagodkina 4		Pts: Peng 16; Rebs: Huang F. 8 Asts: Huang F. 9

Gelora Bung Karno Basketball Hall, Jakarta
Referees: Ferdinand Pascual (PHI), Watcharin Padungratchadakit (THA), Cui Zhexiong (CHN)

17 August
10:00

Chinese Taipei	87–85 (OT)	Korea
Scoring by quarter: 21–23, 22–17, 16–18, 14–15, Overtime: 14–12
Pts: Peng 21; Rebs: Huang P., Bao 7 Asts: Peng 8		Pts: Ro 32; Rebs: Kim H. 9 Asts: Lim 10

Gelora Bung Karno Basketball Hall, Jakarta
Referees: Zhu Duan (CHN), Watcharin Padungratchadakit (THA), Kumiko Kumagai (JPN)

19 August
10:00

Chinese Taipei	84–61	India
Scoring by quarter: 18–17, 15–11, 31–17, 20–16
Pts: Peng 14; Rebs: Huang L. 6 Asts: Lin 7		Pts: Jeena 13; Rebs: Limaye 7 Asts: Limaye 6

Gelora Bung Karno Basketball Hall, Jakarta
Referees: Mohammad Doust (IRI), Preeda Muongmee (THA), Anan Daraghma (PLE)

21 August
18:30

Indonesia	51–115	Chinese Taipei
Scoring by quarter: 12–34, 12–32, 9–24, 18–25
Pts: Christaline 16; Rebs: Orville 7 Asts: Christaline, Orville, Sutjiono 3		Pts: Huang L. 26; Rebs: Cheng 13; Asts: Huang F. 11

Gelora Bung Karno Basketball Hall, Jakarta
Referees: Mohammad Doust (IRI), Preeda Muongmee (THA), Anan Daraghma (PLE)

Quarterfinal

26 August
10:00

Chinese Taipei	76–59	Mongolia
Scoring by quarter: 11–14, 22–20, 20–9, 23–16
Pts: Huang Y. 28; Rebs: Wang 10; Asts: Huang F. 9		Pts: Solongo 14; Rebs: Bulbul, Solongo 7 Asts: Solongo 6

Gelora Bung Karno Basketball Hall, Jakarta
Referees: Snehal Bendke (IND), Kumiko Kumagai (JPN), Haryanto Sutaryo (INA)

Semifinal

30 August
10:00

Chinese Taipei	66–89	Korea
Scoring by quarter: 20–28, 15–22, 12–22, 19–17
Pts: Chen Y.C. 11; Rebs: Huang Y. 6 Asts: Peng 5		Pts: Park H.J., Lim, Ro 17; Rebs: Park J.S. 11; Asts: Park H.J. 10

Istora Gelora Bung Karno, Jakarta
Referees: Snehal Bendke (IND), Preeda Muongmee (THA), Hadi Salem (IRI)

Bronze medal match

1 September
10:00

Chinese Taipei	63–76	Japan
Scoring by quarter: 14–20, 19–6, 13–26, 17–24
Pts: Cheng 16; Rebs: Wang, Cheng 7 Asts: Chen Y.C. 5		Pts: Hayashi 17; Rebs: Umezawa 9 Asts: Miyazaki 11

Istora Gelora Bung Karno, Jakarta
Referees: Lee Ji-youn (KOR), Watcharin Padungratchadakit (THA), Imran Ali Baig (IND)

=== 3×3 basketball ===
Chinese Taipei national 3x3 team will participate in the Games. The men's and women's team placed in pool B respectively based on the FIBA 3x3 federation ranking.

==== Men's tournament ====
Roster

- Chien You-che
- Chou Wei-chen
- Chu Yun-hao
- Tseng Hsiang-chun

Pool B

Pos	Team	Pld	W	L	PF	PA	PD	Qualification
1	South Korea	4	4	0	83	46	+37	Quarterfinals
2	Chinese Taipei	4	3	1	79	50	+29	Quarterfinals
3	Mongolia	4	2	2	63	68	−5	
4	Kyrgyzstan	4	1	3	44	71	−27	
5	Bangladesh	4	0	4	35	69	−34	

Source: OCA

22 August
15:20

Mongolia	15–19	Chinese Taipei
Pts: Mönkh-Orgil 9		Pts: Chou 6

Gelora Bung Karno Tennis Center Court, Jakarta
Referees: Liu (MAS), Rulyov (KAZ)

22 August
17:10

South Korea	20–18	Chinese Taipei
Pts: An 9		Pts: Chu 11

Gelora Bung Karno Tennis Center Court, Jakarta
Referees: Rulyov (KAZ), Ibragimow (TKM)

25 August
17:50

Chinese Taipei	21–8	Bangladesh
Pts: Chu 7		Pts: Rahman 5

Gelora Bung Karno Tennis Center Court, Jakarta
Referees: Tan (SGP), Ito (JPN)

25 August
20:10

Chinese Taipei	21–7	Kyrgyzstan
Pts: Chou 7		Pts: Atabekov, Demchenko 3

Gelora Bung Karno Tennis Center Court, Jakarta
Referees: Ibragimow (TKM), Al-Harthi (OMA)

Quarter-final

26 August
14:20

Iran	18–17	Chinese Taipei
Pts: Azari 8		Pts: Chu 11

Gelora Bung Karno Tennis Center Court, Jakarta
Referees: Ho (HKG), Shi (CHN)

==== Women's tournament ====
Roster

- Lin Tieh
- Lo Pei-chen
- Peng Hsiao-tong
- Wang Jing-ting

Pool B

Pos	Team	Pld	W	L	PF	PA	PD	Qualification
1	Japan	3	3	0	57	15	+42	Quarterfinals
2	Chinese Taipei	3	2	1	50	32	+18	Quarterfinals
3	Mongolia	3	1	2	23	54	−31	
4	Nepal	3	0	3	23	52	−29	

Source: OCA

22 August
16:50

Nepal	8–19	Chinese Taipei
Pts: Malla, Lama 3		Pts: Lo 9

Gelora Bung Karno Tennis Center Court, Jakarta
Referees: Lim (MAS), Rulyov (KAZ)

22 August
18:20

Japan	14–10	Chinese Taipei
Pts: Miyashita 6		Pts: Wang 4

Gelora Bung Karno Tennis Center Court, Jakarta
Referees: Shi (CHN), Tan (SGP)

25 August
21:10

Chinese Taipei	21–10	Mongolia
Pts: Lo 9		Pts: Minjin 4

Gelora Bung Karno Tennis Center Court, Jakarta
Referees: Liu (MAS), Lim (MAS)

Quarter-final

26 August
15:00

South Korea	11–15	Chinese Taipei
Pts: Kim J.Y. 8		Pts: Lin 5

Gelora Bung Karno Tennis Center Court, Jakarta
Referees: Lim (MAS), Ibragimow (TKM)

Semifinal

26 August
17:00

China	21–12	Chinese Taipei
Pts: Dilana 7		Pts: Wang 6

Gelora Bung Karno Tennis Center Court, Jakarta
Referees: Quinn (INA), Lim (MAS)

Bronze medal game

26 August
19:15

Chinese Taipei	14–15 (OT)	Thailand
Pts: Lo 10		Pts: Bunsinprom 6

Gelora Bung Karno Tennis Center Court, Jakarta

== Bowling ==
=== Trios ===
Player	Event	Block 1		Block 2		Total	Final rank
Player	Event	Score	Rank	Score	Rank	Total	Final rank
Wu Hao-ming; Lin Pai-feng; Hsieh Chin-liang	Men's trios	2071	11	2112	2	4183	5
Chen Hsian-an; Chen Ming-tang; Hung Kun-yi	Men's trios	2133	4	2038	10	4171	7
Pan Yu-fen; Chou Chia-chen; Tsai Hsin-yi	Women's trios	2138	3	2117	4	4255	2nd place, silver medalist(s)
Chang Yu-hsuan; Wang Ya-ting; Huang Chiug-yao	Women's trios	2039	6	2055	7	4094	6

=== Team of six ===
Player	Event	Block 1		Block 2		Total	Final rank
Player	Event	Score	Rank	Score	Rank	Total	Final rank
Wu Hao-ming; Chen Hsi-nan; Huang Kun-yi; Chen Ming-tang; Lin Pai-feng; Hsieh Chin-liang	Men's team of six	4059	6	4107	3	8166	3rd place, bronze medalist(s)
Pan Yu-fen; Chang Yu-hsuan; Chou Chia-chen; Wang Yi-ting; Huang Chiung-yao; Tsai Hsin-yi	Women's team of six	4018	3	3051	6	7069	3rd place, bronze medalist(s)

=== Masters ===
Player	Event	Preliminary				Stepladder finals	
Player	Event	Block 1	Block 2	Result	Rank	Score	Final rank
Lin Pei-feng	Men's masters	1928	1974	3902	4	Did not advance	
Hung Kun-yi	Men's masters	1936	1987	3813	7	Did not advance	
Chou Chia-chen	Women's masters	1935	1828	3763	6	Did not advance	
Huang Chiung-yao	Women's masters	1676	1946	3622	11	Did not advance	

== Boxing ==
=== Men ===
Athlete	Event	Round of 32	Round of 16	Quarterfinals	Semifinals	Final	
Athlete	Event	Opposition Result	Opposition Result	Opposition Result	Opposition Result	Opposition Result	Rank
Tu Po-wei	49 kg	Mohibullah (PAK); W 4–1	Carlo Paalam (PHI); L 2–3	Did not advance			
Lai Chu-en	60 kg	Fahad Hassan (UAE); W 5−0	Samataly Toltayev (KAZ); L 2–3	Did not advance			
Kan Chia-wei	75 kg	Bye	Deepak Shrestha (NEP); W 5–0	Abilkhan Amankul (KAZ); L 0–5	Did not advance		

=== Women ===
Athlete	Event	Round of 32	Round of 16	Quarterfinals	Semifinals	Final	
Athlete	Event	Opposition Result	Opposition Result	Opposition Result	Opposition Result	Opposition Result	Rank
Lin Yu-ting	51 kg	Aldriani Beatrichx Suguro (INA); W 5−0	Daomayuly Chantilath (LAO); W RSC	Nazym Kyzaibay (KAZ); W 4–1	Chang Yuan (CHN); L 1–4	Did not advance	3rd place, bronze medalist(s)
Huang Hsiao-wen	57 kg	—N/a	Yodgory Mirzaeva (UZB); W 5−0	Vương Thị Vỹ (VIE); W 3–2	Jo Son-hwa (PRK); L W/O	Did not advance	3rd place, bronze medalist(s)
Wu Shih-yi	60 kg	Bye	Sudaporn Seesondee (THA); L 1–4	Did not advance			

== Canoeing ==
=== Slalom ===
Athlete	Event	Heat		Semifinal		Final	
Athlete	Event	Score	Rank	Score	Rank	Score	Rank
Chang Yun-chuan	Men's C-1	94.94	9 Q	100.34	8 Q	98.96	4
Wu Shao-hsuan	Men's K-1	87.65	6 Q	94.31	5 Q	94.12	4
Chen Wei-han	Women's C-1	119.74	6 Q	125.11	5 Q	111.14	2nd place, silver medalist(s)
Chang Chu-han	Women's K-1	107.10	5 Q	114.59	5 Q	103.80	3rd place, bronze medalist(s)

=== Sprint ===
Athlete	Event	Heat		Semifinal		Final	
Athlete	Event	Score	Rank	Score	Rank	Score	Rank
Hsieh Ming-juan	Women's K-1 200 metres	47.986	4 SF	44.298	3 FA	46.326	8
Tsai Liang-yu; Hsieh Ming-juan	Women's K-2 500 metres	—N/a				2:01.973	7
Liu Hui-chi; Chen Hsin-shuang; Yan Siou-hua; Chou Ju-chuan	Women's K-4 500 metres	—N/a				1:41.279	6

=== Traditional boat race ===
Athlete	Event	Heat			Repechage			Semifinal			Final		
Athlete	Event	Heat	Score	Rank	Heat	Score	Rank	Heat	Score	Rank	Heat	Score	Rank
Tuan Yen-yu; Lin Sheng-ru; Lin Min-hao; Ho Chia-lin; Chuang Ying-chieh; Chou En-ping Chou Chih-wei; Chien Cheng-yen; Chen Chou Yue-hung; Chen Yuan; Chen Tzu-hsien; Chang Sheng-huang	Men's TBR-12 200 metres	2	50.707	1 SF	—N/a			1	50.664	1 FA	A	51.358	2nd place, silver medalist(s)
Yin Wan-ting; Wu Wei-min; Wu Chun-chieh; Wu Chen-po; Tuan Yen-yu; Lin Sheng-ru; Lin Min-hao; Ho Chia-lin Chuang Ying-chieh; Chou En-ping; Chou Chih-wei; Chien Cheng-yen; Chen Chou Yueh-hung; Chen Yu-an; Chen Tzu-hsien; Chang Sheng-huang	Men's TBR-12 500 metres	2	2:15.610	2 SF	—N/a			2	2:13.414	1 FA	A	2:11.691	1st place, gold medalist(s)
Yin Wan-ting; Wu Wei-min; Wu Chun-chieh; Wu Chen-po; Tuan Yen-yu; Lin Sheng-ru; Lin Min-hao; Ho Chia-lin Chuang Ying-chieh; Chou En-ping; Chou Chih-wei; Chien Cheng-yen; Chen Chou Yueh-hung; Chen Yu-an; Chen Tzu-hsien; Chang Sheng-huang	Men's TBR-12 1000 metres	1	4:38.860	1 SF	—N/a			2	4:36.839	1 FA	A	4:31.185	1st place, gold medalist(s)
Pai Chien-yu; Liu Yen-ting; Liu Jen-yu; Lin Yi-an; Lin Pei-hsuan; Lin Meng-jung Lin Jia-min; Hung Wei; Chu Hsiang-ting; Cheng Hsin-hui; Chou Ching-ting; Chen Pin-chun	Women's TBR-12 200 metres	1	58.555	6 SF	—N/a			1	58.513	6 FA	A	1:00.681	6
Tsai Wen-ching; Tai Yin-chen; Rao Jhih Syuan; Pai Wei-shiu; Pai Chien-yu; Liu Yen Ting; Liu Jen-yu; Lin Yi-an Lin Pei-hsuan; Lin Meng-jung; Lin Jia-min; Hung Wei; Chu Hsiang-ting; Cheng Hsin-hui; Chou Ching-ting; Chen Pin-chun	Women's TBR-12 500 metres	1	2:32.656	3 SF	—N/a			1	2:33.722	4 FB	B	2:35.988	2

== Contract bridge ==
=== Men ===
Athlete	Event	Qualification round		Semifinals		Finals	
Athlete	Event	Score	Rank	Score	Rank	Score	Rank
Wang Siao-yu; Liu Ming-chien	Pair	1505.20	12 Q	1090.10	8 Q	351.00	8
Chen Li-jen; Lin Po-yi	Pair	1460.70	16 Q	951.00	21	Did not advance	
Wu Tzu-lin; Lin Ying-yi	Pair	1385.40	27	Did not advance			
Lin Ying-yi; Wu Tzu-lin; Chen Li-jen; Lin Po-yi	Team	161.25	5	Did not advance			

=== Women ===
Athlete	Event	Qualification round		Semifinals		Finals	
Athlete	Event	Score	Rank	Score	Rank	Score	Rank
Wu Yu-fang; Tsai Wen-chuan	Pair	799.50	16 Q	748.90	9 Q	385.80	2nd place, silver medalist(s)
Liu Pei-hua; So Ho-yee	Pair	853.10	12 Q	764.10	6 Q	321.80	11
Chen Yin-shou; Lin Yin-yu	Pair	907.90	5 Q	700.40	13	Did not advance	

=== Mixed ===
Athlete	Event	Qualification round		Semifinals		Finals	
Athlete	Event	Score	Rank	Score	Rank	Score	Rank
Yang Hsin-lung; Lu Yi-zu	Pair	1318.70	1 Q	774.00	1 Q	363.00	1st place, gold medalist(s)
Fan Kang-wei; Tsai Po-ya	Pair	1280.00	8 Q	706.40	12	357.00	2nd place, silver medalist(s)
Hsiao Tzu-liang; Wang Jui	Pair	1131.60	22	Did not advance			
Tsai Po-ya; Lu Yi-zu; Wang Jui; Fan Kang-wei; Yang Hsin-lung; Hsiao Tzu-liang	Team	110.09	7	Did not advance			

=== Supermixed ===
Athlete	Event	Qualification round		Semifinals		Finals	
Athlete	Event	Score	Rank	Score	Rank	Score	Rank
So Ho-yee; Liu Pei-hua; Chen Yin-shou; Lin Yin-yu; Wang Shao-yu; Liu ming-chien	Team	117.63	1 Q	92.33	3	did not advance	3rd place, bronze medalist(s)

== Cycling ==
=== Mountain biking ===
Athlete	Event	Final	
Athlete	Event	Time	Rank
Chiang Sheng-shan	Men's cross-country	–3 laps	15
Chiang Sheng-shan	Men's downhill	2:18.184	2nd place, silver medalist(s)
Tsai Ya-yu	Women's cross-country	1:30.53	5
Chou Pei-ni	Women's cross-country	–2 laps	9
Chou Pei-ni	Women's downhill	2:46.516	5

=== Road cycling ===
Athlete	Event	Final	
Athlete	Event	Time	Rank
Feng Chun-kai	Men's road time trial	58:19.19	5
Huang Ting-ying	Women's road time trial	35:14.55	7

=== Track ===
==== Men ====
Athlete	Event	Qualification		Final	
Athlete	Event	Time	Rank	Time	Rank
Li Wen-chao	Pursuit	4:34.914	6	Did not advance	

Athlete	Event	SR		TR		ER		PR		Overall	
Athlete	Event	Points	Rank	Points	Rank	Points	Rank	Points	Rank	Results	Rank
Li Wen-chao	Omnium	34	4	14	14	26	8	-18	15	56	13

==== Women ====
Athlete	Event	Qualification		Final	
Athlete	Event	Time	Rank	Time	Rank
Huang Ting-ying	Pursuit	3:43.917	4 QB	3:45.449	3rd place, bronze medalist(s)

Athlete	Event	Round 1			Repechage			Round 2			Final		
Athlete	Event	Heat	Time	Rank	Heat	Time	Rank	Heat	Time	Rank	Heat	Time	Rank
Chang Yao	Keirin	1	+1.944	5 R	2	+0.107	2 Q	2	+0.550	6 Q	2	+0.618	10

Athlete	Event	SR		TR		ER		PR		Overall	
Athlete	Event	Points	Rank	Points	Rank	Points	Rank	Points	Rank	Results	Rank
Huang Ting-ying	Omnium	38	2	38	2	38	2	12	7	126	2nd place, silver medalist(s)

== Equestrian ==
Dressage

Athlete	Horse	Event	Prix St-Georges		Intermediate I		Intermediate I Freestyle	
Athlete	Horse	Event	Score	Rank	Score	Rank	Score	Rank
Chang Yu-chieh	Alatrichta	Individual	Eliminated		did not advance			
Chiu Yu-chi	Ziroco	Individual	64.293	23 Q	64.382	21 Q	66.655	13
Nicole Nia Hang	Berlusconi 4	Individual	66.117	14 Q	66.205	13 Q	66.210	15
Lin Chi-chun	Urban Legend	Individual	61.617	26 Q	63.705	22	did not advance	
Chiu Yu-chi; Lin Chi-chun; Nicole Nia Hang; Chang Yu-chieh	See above	Team	64.009	5	—N/a			

Jumping

Athlete	Horse	Event	Qualification		Qualifier 1			Qualifier 2 Team Final			Final round A			Final round B		
Athlete	Horse	Event	Points	Rank	Penalties	Total	Rank	Penalties	Total	Rank	Penalties	Total	Rank	Penalties	Total	Rank
Chen Shao-man	Ninyon	Individual	5.40	21	0	5.40	10 Q	4	9.40	16 Q	4	13.40	10 Q	4	17.40	12
Hsieh Ping-yang	Just Energie	Individual	5.01	18	9 #	14.01	30 Q	4	18.01	26 Q	12	30.01	23 Q	9	39.01	18
Lu Ting-hsuan	Le Point Koe	Individual	10.11 #	40	8	18.11	38 Q	Eliminated			did not advance					
Wong I-sheau	Zadarijke V	Individual	4.31	15	0	4.31	9 Q	4	8.31	14 Q	17	25.31	21^{[a]}	did not advance		
Wong I-sheau; Hsieh Ping-yang; Lu Ting-hsuan; Chen Shao-man	See above	Team	14.72	5	8	22.72	5 Q	12	34.72	6	—N/a					

1. – indicates that the score of this rider does not count in the team competition, since only the best three results of a team are counted.
  ^{a} Wong I-shoau (Zadarijke V) qualified to the final round B but was replaced by Hsieh Ping-yang (Just Energie).

== Fencing ==
Individual

Athlete	Event	Preliminaries Pool							Round of 32	Round of 16	Quarterfinals	Semifinals	Finals	
Athlete	Event	Opponent Score	Opponent Score	Opponent Score	Opponent Score	Opponent Score	Opponent Score	Seed	Opposition Score	Opposition Score	Opposition Score	Opposition Score	Opposition Score	Rank
Ou Feng-ming	Men's foil	—N/a	Tamirlan Kaliyev (KAZ); W 5–1	Ahmed Alquradaghi (QAT); W 5–3	Cheng Xing Han (MAS); W 5–1	Hoi Man Kit (MAC); W 5–1	Nicholas Choi (HKG); L 1–5	6 Q	Bye	Hoàng Ngọc Hiếu (VIE); W 15–9	Son Young-ki (KOR); L 8–15	Did not advance		
Chen Chih-chieh	Men's foil	—N/a	Brennan Wayne Louie (PHI); W 5–4	Ma Jianfei (CHN); L 3–5	Ha Tae-gyu (KOR); L 2–5	Kevin Jerrold Chan (INA); L 3–5	Sitsadipat Doungpatra (THA); W 5–4	21 Q	Brennan Wayne Louie (PHI); W 15–13	Toshiya Saito (JPN); L 12–15	Did not advance			
Cheng Hsin	Women's foil	Liu Yan Wai (HKG); L 3–5	Mona Shaito (LBN); W 5–4	Latifa Alhosani (UAE); W 5–0	Ho Peng I (MAC); W 5–2	Jeon Hee-sook (KOR); L 2–3	Nurul Aini (INA); W 5–4	9 Q	Bye	Mona Shaito (LBN); W 15–12	Fu Yiting (CHN); L 7–14	Did not advance		
Yang Chin-man	Women's foil	—N/a	Karanikar Siribrahmanakul (THA); W 5–0	Nam Hyun-hee (KOR); L 4–5	Maxine Wong Jie Xin (SGP); L 2–5	Đỗ Thị Anh (VIE); W 5–2	Kimberley Vanessa Cheung (HKG); W 5–4	11 Q	Bye	Maxine Wong Jie Xin (SGP); L 8–15	Did not advance			

Team

Athlete	Event	Preliminaries Pool		Round of 16	Quarterfinals	Semifinals	Finals	
Athlete	Event	Opponent Score	Seed	Opposition Score	Opposition Score	Opposition Score	Opposition Score	Rank
Chen Chih-chieh; Chen Yi-tung; Ou Feng-ming; Wang Chun-jui	Men's foil	27	6	Bye	China; L 31–45	Did not advance		
Cheng Hsin; Lei Yu-ru; Yang Chin-man; Yu Li-chun	Women's foil	20	6	Bye	Singapore; L 19–45	Did not advance		

== Field hockey ==
Chinese Taipei entered the women's national field hockey team that competed at the Games.

Summary

Key:

- ET – After extra time
- P – Match decided by penalty-shootout.

Team	Event	Group Stage					Semifinal	Final / BM / Pl.	
Team	Event	Opposition Score	Opposition Score	Opposition Score	Opposition Score	Rank	Opposition Score	Opposition Score	Rank
Chinese Taipei women's	Women's tournament	Japan; L 0–11	China; L 0–9	Hong Kong; W 3–2	Malaysia; L 0–11	4	Did not advance	Indonesia; L 0–2	8

=== Women's tournament ===
Roster

The following is the Chinese Taipei roster in the women's field hockey tournament of the 2018 Asian Games.

Head coach: (Chinese Taipei) Su Chih-hua

1. Chang Chia-yi (GK)
2. Yang Chun-hui
3. Chen Tsai-yu
4. Liu Li-yen
5. Chen Ying-li
6. Yang Chia-yu
11. Tseng Wan-ju (C)
12. Su Chieh-yu
13. Shih Shu-hsin
16. Wang Shih-hsin
17. Lin Ting-yun
18. Lin Chia-jung (GK)
20. Cheng I-lun
21. Liao Pei-shan
23. Liu Kuan-yu

Pool A

Pos	Team	Pld	W	D	L	PF	PA	PD	Pts	Qualification
1	Japan	4	4	0	0	24	3	+21	12	Semifinals
2	China	4	2	1	1	28	6	+22	7	Semifinals
3	Malaysia	4	2	1	1	22	5	+17	7	5th place game
4	Chinese Taipei	4	1	0	3	3	33	−30	3	7th place game
5	Hong Kong	4	0	0	4	2	32	−30	0	9th place game

Source: FIH
Rules for classification: 1) points; 2) goal difference; 3) goals scored; 4) head-to-head result.

19 August 2018
16:00

Japan	11–0	Chinese Taipei
H Nagai 3', 6', 20', 43', 54'; Kawamura 9', 13', 21', 52'; Nishikori 32'; Karino 59'	Report

Umpires:
Suzi Sutton (USA)
Binish Hayat (PAK)

21 August 2018
16:00

China	9–0	Chinese Taipei
Xi 9', 27'; Gu 30', 45'; Zhang X 36', 56'; Peng 50', 55'; Liang 54'	Report

Umpires:
Junko Wagatsuma (JPN)
Dahiya Deepa (IND)

23 August 2018
16:00

Hong Kong	2–3	Chinese Taipei
O. Chiu 22'; Lau 34'	Report	Yang Chi. 15'; Liao 40'; Yang Chu. 42'

Umpires:
Suzi Sutton (USA)
Binish Hayat (PAK)

25 August 2018
14:00

Chinese Taipei	0–11	Malaysia
	Report	Abdul Rashid 4', 26', 40', 44', 56'; Mohd Ali 10'; Aziz 21', 52'; Sumantri 26'; Zulkifli 32'; Onn 51'

Umpires:
Cookie Tan (SGP)
Ornpimol Kittiteerasopon (THA)

Seventh place game

29 August 2018
12:30

Chinese Taipei	0–2	Indonesia
	Report	Arindah 21'; Suwito 41'

Umpires:
Nur Hafizah Azman (MAS)
Ornpimol Kittiteerasopon (THA)

== Football ==
Chinese Taipei men's and women's team were drawn in the group A at the Games respectively.

Summary

Team	Event	Group Stage					Round of 16	Quarterfinal	Semifinal	Final / BM	
Team	Event	Opposition Score	Opposition Score	Opposition Score	Opposition Score	Rank	Opposition Score	Opposition Score	Opposition Score	Opposition Score	Rank
Chinese Taipei men's	Men's tournament	Palestine; D 0–0	Indonesia; L 0–4	Hong Kong; L 0–4	Laos; L 0–2	5	did not advance				25
Chinese Taipei women's	Women's tournament	—N/a	South Korea; L 1–2	Indonesia; W 4–0	Maldives; W 7–0	2 Q	—N/a	Vietnam; W 0–0 (4–3)	China; L 0–1	Bronze medal match South Korea; L 0–4	4

=== Men's tournament ===
Roster

The following is the Chinese Taipei squad in the men's football tournament of the 2018 Asian Games. The team of 20 players was officially named on 7 August.

Head coach: Peng Wu-song

No.	Pos.	Player	Date of birth (age)	Club
1	GK	Pan Wen-chieh*	29 June 1992 (aged 26)	(Chinese Taipei Football Association) Tatung
2	DF	Wang Ruei*	10 August 1993 (aged 25)	(Chinese Taipei Football Association) Taiwan Power Company
3	DF	Chen Ting-yang* (captain)	28 September 1992 (aged 25)	(Chinese Taipei Football Association) Taiwan Power Company
4	DF	Tsuo Yu-chieh	24 September 1998 (aged 19)	(Chinese Taipei Football Association) Hang Yuen
5	MF	Huang Hsiang-che	2 May 1999 (aged 19)	(Chinese Taipei Football Association) Tatung
6	MF	Cheng Hao	13 January 1997 (aged 21)	(Chinese Taipei Football Association) Hasus TSU
7	FW	Yu Chia-huang	23 April 1998 (aged 20)	(Chinese Taipei Football Association) Hang Yuen
8	DF	Wu Yen-shu	21 October 1999 (aged 18)	(Chinese Taipei Football Association) Hualien High School
9	FW	Li Hsiang-wei	15 April 1996 (aged 22)	(Chinese Taipei Football Association) Tainan City
10	FW	Chen Chao-an	22 June 1995 (aged 23)	(Chinese Taipei Football Association) NSTC
11	FW	Li Kai-jie	22 July 1996 (aged 22)	(Chinese Taipei Football Association) Hasus TSU
12	MF	Chen Sheng-wei	13 September 1995 (aged 22)	(Chinese Taipei Football Association) Hasus TSU
13	MF	Chen Hung-wei	28 September 1997 (aged 20)	(Chinese Taipei Football Association) Hasus TSU
14	MF	Lai Chih-hsuan	29 July 1995 (aged 23)	(Chinese Taipei Football Association) Taiwan Power Company
15	MF	Wang Kuan-ju	20 January 1996 (aged 22)	(Chinese Taipei Football Association) Hasus TSU
16	MF	Chao Ming-hsiu	9 July 1997 (aged 21)	(Chinese Taipei Football Association) Hasus TSU
17	DF	Hsu Hung-chih	18 March 1996 (aged 22)	(Chinese Taipei Football Association) Hang Yuen
18	GK	Tsai Shuo-che	14 January 1996 (aged 22)	(Chinese Taipei Football Association) Hasus TSU
19	DF	Wei Mao-ting	15 January 1996 (aged 22)	(Chinese Taipei Football Association) Hang Yuen
20	MF	Tu Shao-chieh	2 January 1999 (aged 19)	(Chinese Taipei Football Association) Ming Chuan University

* Over-aged player.

Group A

Pos	Team	Pld	W	D	L	GF	GA	GD	Pts	Qualification
1	Indonesia (H)	4	3	0	1	11	3	+8	9	Advance to knockout stage
2	Palestine	4	2	2	0	5	3	+2	8	Advance to knockout stage
3	Hong Kong	4	2	1	1	9	5	+4	7	Advance to knockout stage
4	Laos	4	1	0	3	4	8	−4	3	
5	Chinese Taipei	4	0	1	3	0	10	−10	1	

Source: Asian Games 2018
Rules for classification: Group stage tiebreakers
(H) Hosts
10 August 2018
19:00 UTC+7

Palestine	0–0	Chinese Taipei
	Report

Patriot Candrabhaga Stadium, Bekasi
Referee: Kim Dae-yong (South Korea)

12 August 2018
19:00 UTC+7

Chinese Taipei	0–4	Indonesia
	Report	Lilipaly 67', 76'; Beto 71'; Hargianto 90+3'

Patriot Candrabhaga Stadium, Bekasi
Referee: Ammar Mahfoodh (Bahrain)

15 August 2018
16:00 UTC+7

Hong Kong	4–0	Chinese Taipei
Tan Chun Lok 5', 37'; Tarrés 9', 41'	Report

Patriot Candrabhaga Stadium, Bekasi
Referee: Suhaizi Shukri (Malaysia)

20 August 2018
19:00 UTC+7

Chinese Taipei	0–2	Laos
	Report	Phommalivong 5'; Bounmalay 74' (pen.)

Pakansari Stadium, Cibinong
Referee: Ali Shaban (Kuwait)

=== Women's tournament ===
Roster

The following is the Chinese Taipei squad in the women's football tournament of the 2018 Asian Games.

Head coach: (Japan) Hiroyuki Horino

No.	Pos.	Player	Date of birth (age)	Caps	Goals	Club
1	GK	Tsai Ming-jung	23 January 1989 (aged 29)			(Chinese Taipei Football Association) Taichung Blue Whale
18	GK	Chu Fang-yi	30 August 1989 (aged 28)			(Chinese Taipei Football Association) Taipei Play One
2	DF	Lin Kai-ling	21 September 1991 (aged 26)			(Chinese Taipei Football Association) Hualien
5	DF	Chen Ya-huei	28 November 1986 (aged 31)			(Chinese Taipei Football Association) Hualien
11	DF	Lai Li-chin	15 August 1988 (aged 30)			(Chinese Taipei Football Association) Taichung Blue Whale
14	DF	Kao Pei-ling	23 December 1996 (aged 21)			(Chinese Taipei Football Association) Taichung Blue Whale
19	DF	Su Sin-yun	20 November 1996 (aged 21)			(Chinese Taipei Football Association) Hualien
3	MF	Jhuo Li-shan	20 October 1996 (aged 21)			(Chinese Taipei Football Association) Hualien
4	MF	Pao Hsin-hsuan	1 September 1992 (aged 25)			(Chinese Taipei Football Association) Taichung Blue Whale
6	MF	Lin Ya-han	15 December 1990 (aged 27)			(Chinese Taipei Football Association) Taipei Play One
7	MF	Liu Chien-yun	8 August 1992 (aged 26)			(Chinese Taipei Football Association) Taichung Blue Whale
8	MF	Wang Hsiang-huei	28 September 1987 (aged 30)			(Chinese Football Association) Beijing Phoenix
12	MF	Tsou Hsin-ni	11 January 1995 (aged 23)			(Chinese Taipei Football Association) Taichung Blue Whale
15	MF	Pan Shin-yu	3 May 1997 (aged 21)			(Chinese Taipei Football Association) Kaohsiung Yangxin
16	MF	Chan Pi-han	27 April 1992 (aged 26)			(Chinese Taipei Football Association) Hualien
20	MF	Zhuo Li-ping	29 September 1999 (aged 18)			(Chinese Taipei Football Association) Hualien
9	FW	Lee Hsiu-chin	18 August 1992 (aged 25)			(Chinese Taipei Football Association) Taichung Blue Whale
10	FW	Yu Hsiu-chin	1 June 1990 (aged 28)			(Chinese Football Association) Beijing Phoenix
13	FW	Chen Yen-ping	20 August 1991 (aged 26)			(Chinese Taipei Football Association) Taipei Play One
17	FW	Ting Chi	2 June 1995 (aged 23)			(Chinese Taipei Football Association) Taipei Play One

Group A

Pos	Team	Pld	W	D	L	GF	GA	GD	Pts	Qualification
1	South Korea	3	3	0	0	22	1	+21	9	Advance to Knockout stage
2	Chinese Taipei	3	2	0	1	12	2	+10	6	Advance to Knockout stage
3	Indonesia (H)	3	1	0	2	6	16	−10	3	
4	Maldives	3	0	0	3	0	21	−21	0	

Source: Asian Games 2018
Rules for classification: Group stage tiebreakers
(H) Hosts
16 August 2018
15:00 UTC+7

South Korea	2–1	Chinese Taipei
Jeon Ga-eul 8'; Jang Sel-gi 53'	Report	Yu Hsiu-chin 74'

Gelora Sriwijaya Stadium, Palembang
Referee: Rebecca Durcau (Australia)

19 August 2018
18:30 UTC+7

Chinese Taipei	4–0	Indonesia
Yu Hsiu-chin 5'; Chan Pi-han 16'; Lin Ya-han 33'; Michelle Pao 39'	Report

Gelora Sriwijaya Stadium, Palembang
Referee: Asaka Matsushita (Japan)

21 August 2018
18:30 UTC+7

Chinese Taipei	7–0	Maldives
Yu Hsiu-chin 6' (pen.); Pan Shin-yu 12', 31'; Zhuo Li-ping 17', 74'; Michelle Pao 55'; Lee Hsiu-chin 63'	Report

Bumi Sriwijaya Stadium, Palembang
Referee: Pansa Chaisanit (Thailand)

Quarterfinals

24 August 2018
19:30 UTC+7

Chinese Taipei	0–0 (a.e.t.)	Vietnam
	Report
Penalties
Yu Hsiu-chin (penalty scored); Lin Ya-han (penalty scored); Liu Chien-yun (penalty scored); Michelle Pao (penalty scored)	4–3	(penalty scored) Nguyễn Thị Tuyết Dung; (penalty scored) Chương Thị Kiều; (penalty missed) Phạm Hoàng Quỳnh; (penalty scored) Nguyễn Thị Mỹ Anh; (penalty missed) Thái Thị Thảo

Gelora Sriwijaya Stadium, Palembang
Referee: Oh Hyeon-jeong (South Korea)

Semifinals

28 August 2018
19:30 UTC+7

Chinese Taipei	0–1	China
	Report	Wang Shanshan 51'

Gelora Sriwijaya Stadium, Palembang
Referee: Thein Thein Aye (Myanmar)

Bronze medal match

31 August 2018
15:00 UTC+7

South Korea	4–0	Chinese Taipei
Ji So-yun 18'; Lee Geum-min 31'; Lee Min-a 77'; Moon Mi-ra 90'	Report

Gelora Sriwijaya Stadium, Palembang
Referee: Asaka Matsushita (Japan)

== Golf ==
Athlete	Event	Round 1		Round 2		Round 3		Round 4/ Final	
Athlete	Event	Score	Rank	Score	Rank	Score	Rank	Score	Rank
Kevin Yu	Men's individual	74	=27	70	=17	67	6	70	4
Lin Chuan-tai	Men's individual	71	=11	73	=17	70	16	73	19
Hsu Hung-hsuan	Men's individual	77	=45	76	=47	67	=32	77	36
Wang Wei-hsuan	Men's individual	75	=32	76	=41	78	=46	70	39
Kevin Yu; Lin Chuan-tai; Wang Wei-hsuan; Hsu Hung-hsuan	Men's team	220	7	219	=9	204	=5	213	5
Hou Yu-chiang	Women's individual	72	=12	72	=14	71	=12	71	12
An Ho-yu	Women's individual	73	=18	72	=16	70	=12	79	=20
Hou Yu-sang	Women's individual	73	=18	74	=20	75	=23	75	27
Hou Yu-sang; An Ho-yu; Hou Yu-chiang	Women's team	145	8	144	=7	141	7	146	7

== Gymnastics ==
=== Artistic ===
==== Team & individual qualifications ====
Men

Athlete	Floor (gymnastics)		Pommel horse		Rings (gymnastics)		Vault (gymnastics)		Parallel bars		Horizontal bar		Total All-Around	
Athlete	Score	Rank	Score	Rank	Score	Rank	Score	Rank	Score	Rank	Score	Rank	Score	Rank
Chinese Taipei	40.350	4	40.900	3	42.450	4	41.550	5	38.000	9	39.350	5	242.600	4 Q
Lee Chih-kai	13.900	9 PFR	15.050	1 Q	13.350	26	14.300	9	14.000	11 Q	11.300	48	81.900	6 Q
Yu Chao-wei	11.800	43	12.200	29	14.150	12	13.650	28	13.250	24	11.850	38	76.900	13 Q
Shiao Yu-jan	12.000	38	13.650	12			13.600	30	10.750	52	12.950	17	62.950	
Tang Chia-hung	14.450	2 Q			13.650	22					14.550	1 Q	42.650	
Chen Chih-yu					14.650	3 Q							14.650	

Women

Athlete	Vault (gymnastics)		Uneven bars		Balance beam		Floor (gymnastics)		Total All-Around	
Athlete	Score	Rank	Score	Rank	Score	Rank	Score	Rank	Score	Rank
Chinese Taipei	39.400	6	36.350	5	34.850	7	35.400	7	146.000	5 Q
Fang Ko-ching	13.350	17 Q	12.100	18	11.250	34	12.400	14	49.100	13 Q
Chuang Hsin-ju	12.950	27	12.000	19	11.800	23	11.200	33	47.950	17 Q
Huang Hui-mei	13.100	26			10.650	41	10.500	42	34.250	
Chen Chian-shiun			12.250	16			11.800	22	24.050	
Lai Pin-ju			11.000	29	11.800	23			22.800	

==== Finals ====
Men

Athlete	Floor (gymnastics)		Pommel horse		Rings (gymnastics)		Vault (gymnastics)		Parallel bars		Horizontal bar		Total All-Around	
Athlete	Score	Rank	Score	Rank	Score	Rank	Score	Rank	Score	Rank	Score	Rank	Score	Rank
Team all-around
Chinese Taipei	40.450	4	39.700	4	42.000	4	40.750	6	37.950	6	39.450	4	240.300	4
Lee Chih-kai	14.050		15.100		—N/a		14.250		13.750		11.950			
Yu Chao-wei	—N/a		10.550		13.750		12.600		12.550		—N/a			
Shiao Yu-jan	13.150		14.050		—N/a		13.900		—N/a		12.800			
Tang Chia-hung	13.250		—N/a		13.950		—N/a		—N/a		14.700			
Chen Chih-yu	—N/a		—N/a		14.300		—N/a		11.650		—N/a			
Individual all-around
Lee Chih-kai	13.900	9	13.250	17	14.000	17	14.450	5	14.750	6	14.000	7	84.850	5
Yu Chao-wei	11.800	43	12.200	29	14.150	12	13.650	28	13.250	24	11.850	38	76.900	12
Apparatus
	Floor		PH		Rings		Vault		PB		HB			
Lee Chih-kai	13.950	4	15.400	1st place, gold medalist(s)	—N/a		—N/a		14.025	6	—N/a			
Tang Chia-hung	14.425	2nd place, silver medalist(s)	—N/a		—N/a		—N/a		—N/a		14.725	1st place, gold medalist(s)		
Chen Chih-yu	—N/a		—N/a		14.600	3rd place, bronze medalist(s)	—N/a		—N/a		—N/a			

Women

Athlete	Vault (gymnastics)		Uneven bars		Balance beam		Floor (gymnastics)		Total All-Around	
Athlete	Score	Rank	Score	Rank	Score	Rank	Score	Rank	Score	Rank
Team all-around
Chinese Taipei	39.700	5	33.600	6	34.650	5	34.850	5	142.800	5
Fang Ko-ching	13.750		11.650		11.950		12.450			
Chuang Hsin-ju	13.150		11.650		11.200		—N/a			
Huang Hui-mei	12.800		—N/a		—N/a		10.800			
Chen Chian-shiun	—N/a		10.300		—N/a		11.600			
Lai Pin-ju	—N/a		—N/a		11.500		—N/a			
Individual all-around
Fang Ko-ching	13.350	17	12.100	18	11.250	34	12.400	14	49.100	11
Chuang Hsin-ju	12.950	27	12.000	19	11.800	23	11.200	33	47.950	15
Apparatus
	Vault		UB		BB		Floor			
Fang Ko-ching	13.187	5	—N/a		—N/a		—N/a			

== Handball ==
Chinese Taipei will compete in group D at the men's team event.

Summary

Key:

- ET – After extra time
- P – Match decided by penalty-shootout.

Team	Event	Preliminary	Standing	Main / Class.	Rank / Standing	Semifinals / Pl.	Final / BM / Pl.	
Team	Event	Opposition Score	Standing	Opposition Score	Rank / Standing	Opposition Score	Opposition Score	Rank
Chinese Taipei men's	Men's tournament	Group D India: W 38–28; Iraq: L 30–37; Bahrain: L 21–37	3	Group III; Pakistan: W 36–32; Malaysia: W 34–19; Indonesia: W 37–19; India: W 35–31	1	Did not advance		9

=== Men's tournament ===
Roster

- Lin You-ting
- Liu-Tzu-fan
- Huang Hsin-wei
- Wang-Ta-kang
- Chiu Yi-fan
- Wu Hsiu-min
- Lin Kun-ming
- Lai Hung-sheng
- Chen Yen-tung
- Hsu Chih-kun
- Pan En-chieh
- Huang Chen-kang
- Hsu Hsien-ming
- Hsiao Nien-cheng
- Chao Hsien-chang
- Huang Chia-hua

Group D

Pos	Team	Pld	W	D	L	GF	GA	GD	Pts	Qualification
1	Bahrain	3	3	0	0	99	70	+29	6	Main round / Group 1–2
2	Iraq	3	2	0	1	101	89	+12	4	Main round / Group 1–2
3	Chinese Taipei	3	1	0	2	89	102	−13	2	Main round / Group 3
4	India	3	0	0	3	82	110	−28	0	Main round / Group 3

Source: AHF

13 August; 11:00	India	28–38	Chinese Taipei	POPKI Sports Hall, Jakarta; Referees: Al-Wahibi, Al-Shahi (OMA)
13 August; 11:00	Hare. Singh 8	(13–19)	Chiu 8	POPKI Sports Hall, Jakarta; Referees: Al-Wahibi, Al-Shahi (OMA)
13 August; 11:00	2× (yellow card) 3× (suspension)		1× (yellow card) 3× (suspension)	POPKI Sports Hall, Jakarta; Referees: Al-Wahibi, Al-Shahi (OMA)

15 August; 18:00	Iraq	37–30	Chinese Taipei	POPKI Sports Hall, Jakarta; Referees: Al-Marhoon, Al-Mawt (BHR)
15 August; 18:00	Adnan 10	(17–14)	Chao 8	POPKI Sports Hall, Jakarta; Referees: Al-Marhoon, Al-Mawt (BHR)
15 August; 18:00	2× (yellow card) 6× (suspension)		1× (yellow card) 5× (suspension) 1× (red card)	POPKI Sports Hall, Jakarta; Referees: Al-Marhoon, Al-Mawt (BHR)

17 August; 20:00	Bahrain	37–21	Chinese Taipei	POPKI Sports Hall, Jakarta; Referees: Tavakkoli, Valadkhanian (IRI)
17 August; 20:00	Al-Samahiji 6	(18–10)	Pan 8	POPKI Sports Hall, Jakarta; Referees: Tavakkoli, Valadkhanian (IRI)
17 August; 20:00	4× (yellow card) 3× (suspension)		4× (yellow card) 2× (suspension)	POPKI Sports Hall, Jakarta; Referees: Tavakkoli, Valadkhanian (IRI)

Classification round

Pos	Team	Pld	W	D	L	GF	GA	GD	Pts
1	Chinese Taipei	4	4	0	0	142	95	+47	8
2	India	4	3	0	1	141	104	+37	6
3	Pakistan	4	2	0	2	134	111	+23	4
4	Indonesia	4	1	0	3	96	124	−28	2
5	Malaysia	4	0	0	4	78	157	−79	0

Source: AHF

20 August; 9:00	Chinese Taipei	36–32	Pakistan	POPKI Sports Hall, Jakarta; Referees: Hizaki, Ikebuchi (JPN)
20 August; 9:00	Chao 8	(16–14)	Pervaiz 8	POPKI Sports Hall, Jakarta; Referees: Hizaki, Ikebuchi (JPN)
20 August; 9:00	2× (yellow card) 1× (suspension)		4× (suspension)	POPKI Sports Hall, Jakarta; Referees: Hizaki, Ikebuchi (JPN)

21 August; 11:00	Chinese Taipei	34–13	Malaysia	POPKI Sports Hall, Jakarta; Referees: Lee, Koo (KOR)
21 August; 11:00	Liu 9	(19–6)	Abdul Karim, Ismail 3	POPKI Sports Hall, Jakarta; Referees: Lee, Koo (KOR)
21 August; 11:00	2× (yellow card)		1× (yellow card) 3× (suspension)	POPKI Sports Hall, Jakarta; Referees: Lee, Koo (KOR)

24 August; 9:00	Indonesia	19–37	Chinese Taipei	POPKI Sports Hall, Jakarta; Referees: Al-Wahibi, Al-Shahi (OMA)
24 August; 9:00	Tolang 7	(7–18)	Chiu, Huang C.K., Hsiao 5	POPKI Sports Hall, Jakarta; Referees: Al-Wahibi, Al-Shahi (OMA)
24 August; 9:00	2× (yellow card) 5× (suspension)		2× (yellow card)	POPKI Sports Hall, Jakarta; Referees: Al-Wahibi, Al-Shahi (OMA)

26 August; 11:00	India	31–35	Chinese Taipei	POPKI Sports Hall, Jakarta; Referees: Ota, Shimajiri (JPN)
26 August; 11:00	D. Singh 10	(12–15)	Chiu 11	POPKI Sports Hall, Jakarta; Referees: Ota, Shimajiri (JPN)
26 August; 11:00	1× (yellow card) 3× (suspension)		2× (yellow card) 4× (suspension)	POPKI Sports Hall, Jakarta; Referees: Ota, Shimajiri (JPN)

== Judo ==
=== Men ===
Athlete	Event	Round of 32	Round of 16	Repechage	Quarterfinals	Semifinals	Final	
Athlete	Event	Opposition Score	Opposition Score	Opposition Score	Opposition Score	Opposition Score	Opposition Score	Rank
Yang Yung-wei	60 kg	Bye	Ali Mohsen Ali Khousrof (YEM); W 10–0s1	Mönkhbatyn Urantsetseg (MGL); W 10s2–0s3	Diyorbek Urozboev (UZB); L 1s1–10s1	—N/a	Bronze medal match An Jae-yong (PRK); W 10s1–0s3	3rd place, bronze medalist(s)
Huang Sheng-ting	66 kg	Mohammed Gamal Awadh Salem (YEM); W 10–0	An Ba-ul (KOR); L 0s1–1	—N/a	Did not advance			
Chang Wei-cheng	81 kg	Bye	Gao Haiyuan (CHN); L 0–1s1	—N/a	Did not advance			
Shen Chao-en	90 kg	Qaisar Khan (PAK); W 1s2–0	Gwak Dong-han (KOR); L 0–11	Did not advance				
Lu Guan-zhi	100 kg	Asadullah Tajik (AFG); W 10–1	Batyr Hojamuhammedov (TKM); L 0–10	Did not advance				
Chen Sheng-min	+100 kg	—N/a	Bekbolot Toktogonov (KGZ); L 0–10	Did not advance				

=== Women ===
Athlete	Event	Round of 32	Round of 16	Repechage	Quarterfinals	Semifinals	Final	
Athlete	Event	Opposition Score	Opposition Score	Opposition Score	Opposition Score	Opposition Score	Opposition Score	Rank
Gao Jun-ying	48 kg	—N/a	Dewi Sinta (INA); W 10s1–1	Yao Xiong (CHN); L 0s1–10	Urantsetseg Munkhbat (MGL); L 0–10	Did not advance		
Chen Chin-ying	52 kg	Vong Chi Ieng (MAC); W 11–0	Nguyễn Thị Thanh Thúy (VIE); W 1s1–0s1	Kachakorn Warasiha (THA); L 0s2–10	Natsumi Tsunoda (JPN); L 0–10	Did not advance		
Lien Chen-ling	57 kg	Bye	Chindamany Xayavongsa (LAO); W 10–0	Kim Jan-di (KOR); W 10s2–0s2	Lu Tongjuan (CHN); L 0s1–1	—N/a	Bronze medal match Sevara Nishanbayeva (KAZ); W 10–0	3rd place, bronze medalist(s)
Chen Yun-ting	63 kg	—N/a	Tang Lai Man (MAC); W 11–0s2	—N/a	Gankhaich Bold (MGL); L 0s2–1s2	—N/a	Bronze medal match Tang Jing (CHN); L 0–10	5
Huang Yi-ting	70 kg	—N/a	Kwon Sun-yong (PRK); L 0–1	—N/a	Did not advance			
Tsai Jia-wen	+78 kg	—N/a	Bye	—N/a	Gulzhan Issanova (KAZ); L 0s3–10	—N/a	Beonze medal match Wang Yan (CHN); L 10–0s1	5

=== Mixed ===
Athlete	Event	Round of 16	Quarterfinals	Semifinals	Final	
Athlete	Event	Opposition Score	Opposition Score	Opposition Score	Opposition Score	Rank
Huang Sheng-ting; Shen Chao-en; Chen Sheng-min; Lien Chen-ling; Huang Yi-ting; Tsai Jia-wen	Team	South Korea; L 1–4	Did not advance			

== Ju-jitsu ==
=== Men's ===
Athlete	Event	Round of 32	Round of 16	Repechage	Quarterfinals	Final of tables	Final	
Athlete	Event	Opposition Score	Opposition Score	Opposition Score	Opposition Score	Opposition Score	Opposition Score	Rank
Lee Tien-yu	77 kg	Bye	Abdelkarim Alrashid (JOR); L 0–2 PTS	Did not advance				
Wei Chu-cheng	85 kg	—N/a	Abdurahmanhaji Murtazaliev (KGZ); L 2–2 ADV	Did not advance				
Lin Chang-chih	94 kg	—N/a	Mohamed Ghareed (BRN); L 0–0 RDC	Did not advance				

== Kabaddi ==
Summary

Team	Event	Group Stage				Semifinal	Final	
Team	Event	Opposition Score	Opposition Score	Opposition Score	Rank	Opposition Score	Opposition Score	Rank
Chinese Taipei women's	Women	Bangladesh; W 43−28	South Korea; L 16−20	Iran; W 22−18	2 Q	India; L 14−27	Did not advance	3rd place, bronze medalist(s)

=== Women's tournament ===
Team roster

- Lin I-min
- Lin Yu-fen
- Chuang Ya-han
- Huang Ssu-chin
- Yen Chiao-wen
- Chen Yung-ting
- Hu Yu-chen
- Feng Hsiu-chen
- Qin Pei-jyun
- Huang Yi-yun
- Liao Yu-tzu
- Wu Yu-jung

Group B

Pos	Team	Pld	W	D	L	PF	PA	PD	Pts	Qualification
1	Iran	3	2	0	1	111	61	+50	4 (Note: Match points difference against the teams which scored 25% or more of the league points: IRI +22, TPE 0, KOR −22.)	Semifinals
2	Chinese Taipei	3	2	0	1	81	66	+15	4	Semifinals
3	South Korea	3	2	0	1	92	87	+5	4	
4	Bangladesh	3	0	0	3	72	142	−70	0	

Source: OCA
Notes:

19 August
11:30

Bangladesh	28–43 (HT: 16–23)	Chinese Taipei

Garuda Theatre, Jakarta

20 August
9:50

Chinese Taipei	16–20 (HT: 7–8)	South Korea

Garuda Theatre, Jakarta

21 August
9:50

Chinese Taipei	22–18 (HT: 14–9)	Iran

Garuda Theatre, Jakarta

Semifinal

23 August
15:00

India	27–14 (HT: 11–8)	Chinese Taipei

Garuda Theatre, Jakarta

== Karate ==
=== Kata ===
Athlete	Event	1/8 Finals	Repechage	Quarterfinals	Semifinals	Final / BM	
Athlete	Event	Opposition Score	Opposition Score	Opposition Score	Opposition Score	Opposition Score	Rank
Wang Yi-ta	Men's individual	Chris Cheung Tsz Man (HKG); W 4–1	—N/a	Park Hee-jun (KOR); W 4–1	Kuok Kin Hang (MAC); W 3–2	Ryo Kiyuna (JPN); L 0–5	2nd place, silver medalist(s)

=== Kumite ===
Athlete	Event	1/16 Finals	Repechage Round 2	1/8 Finals	Final Repechage	Quarterfinals	Semifinals	Final / BM	
Athlete	Event	Opposition Score	Opposition Score	Opposition Score	Opposition Score	Opposition Score	Opposition Score	Opposition Score	Rank
Tang Wei-chieh	Men's 67 kg	Mostafa Rezaee (AFG); W 6–2	—N/a	Ali Abdulaziz (KUW); L 0–3	Fahad Atiah Alkhathami (KSA); W 8–0	—N/a		Bronze meadl match Abdel Rahman Almasatfa (JOR); L 1–9	5
Hsu Wei-chun	Men's 75 kg	Sandy Firmansyah (INA); W 3–3	—N/a	Yermek Ainazarov (KAZ); W 2–1	—N/a	Kim Mu-il (KOR); W 2–1	Bahman Asgari Ghonchen (IRI); L 0–0	Bronze medal match Teerawat Pongsai (THA); W 8–0	3rd place, bronze medalist(s)
Wu Chun-wei	Men's 84 kg	—N/a		Bye	—N/a	Ryutaro Araga (JPN); L 0–8	Did not advance	Bronze medal match Shakhboz Akhatov (UZB); W 5–5	3rd place, bronze medalist(s)
Gu Shiau-shuang	Women's 50 kg	—N/a		Sirivimon Sirimoungkhoune (LAO); W 3–0	—N/a	Anu Adhikari (NEP); W 7–2	Miho Miyahara (JPN); W 4–2	Bakhriniso Babaeva (UZB); W 3–2	1st place, gold medalist(s)
Wen Tzu-yun	Women's 55 kg	—N/a		Syakilla Salni Jefry Krisnan (MAS); W 1–1	—N/a	Sabina Zakharova (KAZ); W 1–0	Wong Sok I (MAC); W 4–1	Taravat Khaksar (IRI); W 4–0	1st place, gold medalist(s)
Hsu Wei-ning	Women's 61 kg	—N/a		Ko Ji-ryon (PRK); W 1–0	—N/a	Barno Mirzaeva (UZB); L 0–3	Did not advance		
Chao Jao	Women's 68 kg	—N/a		Noviana Dias Marques (TLS); W 9–0	—N/a	Lim Mee-seong (KOR); W 2–0	Tang Lingling (CHN); L 0–5	Bronze medal match Kayo Someya (JPN); L 1–3	5

== Kurash ==
=== Men ===
Athlete	Event	Round of 32	Round of 16	Quarterfinals	Semifinals	Final	
Athlete	Event	Opposition Score	Opposition Score	Opposition Score	Opposition Score	Opposition Score	Rank
Chan Hao-cheng	69 kg	Behzad Vahdani (IRI); W 10–0	Jatin (IND); W 3–0	Bahodur Halimov (TJK); W 10–0	Ruslan Buriev (UZB); L 0–5	Did not advance	3rd place, bronze medalist(s)
Kao Hsuang	69 kg	Gun Jakwiwattanakum (THA); W 10–0	Orifdzhon Dodov (TJK); L 0–10	Did not advance			
Huang Chun-ta	81 kg	Ali Altaweel (KUW); W 5–0	Pharuehasphasathonbodee Suwannaphueng (THA); W 10–0	Behruzi Khojazoda (SYR); L 0–10	Did not advance		
Lo Yu-hsuan	90 kg	Lundeejantsan Ganbaatar (MGL); W 10–0	Putu Wiradamungga Adesta (INA); W 5–0	Yersultan Muzapparov (KAZ); L 0–10	Did not advance		
Lee Po-yen	+90 kg	Frangkling Kakalang (INA); W 10–0	Saidzhalol Saidov (TJK); W 10–0	Mukhsin Khisomiddinov (UZB); L 0–10	Did not advance		

=== Women ===
Athlete	Event	Round of 32	Round of 16	Quarterfinals	Semifinals	Final	
Athlete	Event	Opposition Score	Opposition Score	Opposition Score	Opposition Score	Opposition Score	Rank
Yen Lian	52 kg	Bye	Gerelmaa Erdenetsogt (MGL); L 0–10	Did not advance			
Tsao Chia-wen	52 kg	Bhagawati Majhi (NEP); W 10–0	Pincky Balhara (IND); L 0–5	Did not advance			
Lee Wan-ting	63 kg	Silva Suelen (LBN); W 10–0	Siti Latifah (INA); W 10–0	Mukhlisa Abdumalikova (UZB); L 0–5	Did not advance		
Huang Shih-han	63 kg	Ulzhan Dyussembayeva (KAZ); W 5–0	Hasna Saied (SYR); L 10–0	Dildor Shermetova (UZB); L 0–5	Did not advance		
Yang Hsien-tzu	78 kg	—N/a	Minjinsor Ganbaatar (MGL); W 10–0	Mariya Lohova (TKM); W 3–0	Kumush Yuldashova (UZB); L 0–10	Did not advance	3rd place, bronze medalist(s)
Kao Chia-jin	78 kg	Jahan Muhammedova (TKM); L 0–10	Did not advance				

== Paragliding ==
=== Men ===
Athlete	Event	Rounds										Total	Rank
Athlete	Event	R1	R2	R3	R4	R5	R6	R7	R8	R9	R10	Total	Rank
Yang Yi-chun	Individual accuracy	7	22	123	21	36	0	93	7	309	7	625	6
Yu Lin-qiao	Individual accuracy	2	182	1	4	500	157	1	174	88	41	1150	13
Chen Keng-feng; Liu Cho-yi; Tai Lei; Yang Yi-chun; Yu Lin-qiao	Team accuracy	400	693	425	870	691	855	—N/a				3934	6

== Roller sports ==
=== Skateboarding ===
Athlete	Event	Preliminary		Final	
Athlete	Event	Result	Rank	Result	Rank
Lu Hung-chen	Men's street	18.9	11	Did not advance	
Chu Pei-yu	Women's street	—N/a		8.0	7

=== Speed skating ===
Athlete	Event	Time	Rank
Chao Tsu-cheng	Men's road 20 km race	33:51.418	1st place, gold medalist(s)
Lin Ping-hung	Men's road 20 km race	33:52.049	4
Li Meng-chu	Women's road 20 km race	44:50.929	1st place, gold medalist(s)
Yang Ho-chen	Women's road 20 km race	44.51.168	3rd place, bronze medalist(s)

== Rowing ==
Men

Athlete	Event	Qualification		Repechage		Final	
Athlete	Event	Time	Rank	Time	Rank	Time	Rank
Wang Ming-hui; Hsu Wen-chuan	Double sculls	7:21.59	5 R	7:13.25	4 FB	7:00.48	7

Women

Athlete	Event	Qualification		Repechage		Final	
Athlete	Event	Time	Rank	Time	Rank	Time	Rank
Huang Yi-ting	Single sculls	8:56.66	1 FA	Bye		8:16.14	2nd place, silver medalist(s)
Chen Qing-xuan; Chen Chia-yi	Lightweight double sculls	8:21.24	6 FA	—N/a		8:16.71	5
Chou Chin-yu; Lee Kuan-yi; Hua Yi-an; Hsieh I-ching	Lightweight quadruple sculls	7:46.38	4 R	7:35.76	3 FA	7:14.66	5

== Rugby sevens ==
Chinese Taipei rugby sevens men's team entered the group B at the Games.

Summary

Team	Event	Group Stage				Quarterfinal	Semifinal / Pl.	Final / BM / Pl.	
Team	Event	Opposition Score	Opposition Score	Opposition Score	Rank	Opposition Score	Opposition Score	Opposition Score	Rank
Chinese Taipei men's	Men's tournament	Malaysia; L 10–17	Indonesia; W 41–26	Japan; L 0–31	3 Q	Japan; L 0–43	China; L 7–38	Thailand; W 24–19	7

=== Men's tournament ===
Squad

The following is the Chinese Taipei squad in the men's rugby sevens tournament of the 2018 Asian Games.

Head coach: Chang Wei-cheng

- Chang Lun-wei
- Chang Hao-wei
- Chen Chih-chieh
- Hsieh Pin-yi
- Huang Po-wei
- Huang Te-lung
- Lin Chueh-hao
- Lo Hsin-kuei
- Shen Ching-hung
- Shen Ming-kuang
- Sun Wei-chiang
- Sung Che-yu

Group B

Pos	Team	Pld	W	D	L	PF	PA	PD	Pts	Qualification
1	Japan	3	3	0	0	170	0	+170	9	Quarterfinals
2	Malaysia	3	2	0	1	56	62	−6	7	Quarterfinals
3	Chinese Taipei	3	1	0	2	51	74	−23	5	Quarterfinals
4	Indonesia	3	0	0	3	31	172	−141	3	Ranking round 9–12

Source: Results

30 August
13:12

Malaysia	17–10	Chinese Taipei
Try: Zulkifli 7+' m Azmi 10' m Nasarrudin 13' c Con: Mat Zizi (0/2); Asyraff (1/1)		Try: Hsieh 1' m Lo 6' m Con: Huang P. (0/2)

Gelora Bung Karno Rugby Field, Jakarta
Referee: Matthew Rodden (New Zealand)

30 August
16:52

Chinese Taipei	41–26	Indonesia
Try: Huang T. 2' m Shen M. (2) 4' m, 11' m Chen (2) 7' c, 10' c Hsieh 8' c Huang P. 12' m Con: Shen C. (0/1); Huang P. (3/5); Lin (0/1)		Try: Abdurrohman 5' c Wibowo 7+' c Oloan 9' c Andi 14+' m Con: Oloan (3/4)

Gelora Bung Karno Rugby Field, Jakarta
Referee: Craig Chan (Canada)

31 August
13:56

Japan	31–0	Chinese Taipei
Try: Shin 1' m Motomura (3) 3' c, 7' m, 13' c Kano 10' c Con: Hashino (1/3); Sakai (2/2)

Gelora Bung Karno Rugby Field, Jakarta
Referee: Matthew Rodden (New Zealand)

Quarterfinal

31 August
17:14

Japan	43–0	Chinese Taipei
Try: Matsui (2) 1' m, 4' c Hashino 6' m Soejima 8' c Ozawa (3) 10' c, 12' c, 14' m Con: Sakai (4/7)

Gelora Bung Karno Rugby Field, Jakarta
Referee: Patrick Kwok (Hong Kong)

Classification semifinal (5–8)

1 September
16:12

Chinese Taipei	7–38	China
Try: Huang T. 6' c Con: Huang P. (1/1)		Try: Qi (2) 3' c, 7+' m Zhang 5' m Feng 10' c Ma 12' c Con: Ma (1/3); Feng (2/2)

Gelora Bung Karno Rugby Field, Jakarta
Referee: Patrick Kwok (Hong Kong)

7th place game

1 September
18:46

Chinese Taipei	24–19	Thailand
Try: Shen M. 1' c Hsieh 7+' m Huang P. 10' c Chang L. 13' m Con: Huang P. (2/4)		Try: Sakulthianthong 6' c Kradkrayang (2) 7' m, 12' c Con: Khamkoet (2/3)

Gelora Bung Karno Rugby Field, Jakarta
Referee: Craig Chan (Canada)

== Sailing ==
Men

Athlete	Event	Race															Total	Rank
Athlete	Event	1	2	3	4	5	6	7	8	9	10	11	12	13	14	15	Total	Rank
Chang Hao	RS:X	5	6	6	6	5	6	5	5	4	6	~~(8)~~	6	6	3	5	74	5

== Sambo ==
Key:
- SU – Won by submission.

Athlete	Event	Round of 32	Round of 16	Quarterfinal	Semifinal	Repechage 1	Repechage 2	Repechage final	Final / BM	
Athlete	Event	Opposition Result	Opposition Result	Opposition Result	Opposition Result	Opposition Result	Opposition Result	Opposition Result	Opposition Result	Rank
Chuang Kai-jen	Men's 90 kg	N Elias (LBN); W 4–0 ^{Dsq}	U Khasanbekov (TJK); L 0–8	did not advance		Bye	RA Bahari (INA); L 0–1	did not advance		

== Shooting ==
Men

Athlete	Event	Qualification round		Final	
Athlete	Event	Total	Rank	Result	Rank
Lu Shao-chuan	10 metre air rifle	624.5	7 Q	226.8	3rd place, bronze medalist(s)
Yang Kun-pi	Trap	118 (4)	6 Q	48	1st place, gold medalist(s)
Shih Jung-hung	Trap	117	13	Did not advance	
Chuang Han-lin	Double trap	128	14	Did not advance	
Tsai I-hsuan	Skeet	118	18	Did not advance	
Lee Meng-yuan	Skeet	113	22	Did not advance	

Women

Athlete	Event	Qualification round		Final	
Athlete	Event	Total	Rank	Result	Rank
Yu Ai-wen	10 metre air pistol	571	5 Q	114.5	8
Tien Chia-chen	25 metre pistol	581	6 Q	8	8
Wu Chia-ying	25 metre pistol	573	17	Did not advance	
Lin Ying-shin	10 metre air rifle	624.0	8 Q	121.2	8
Chen Yun-yun	10 metre air rifle	619.5	18	Did not advance	
Lin Yan-yu	Trap	118	3 Q	19	5
Lin Yi-chun	Trap	111	12	Did not advance	

Mixed team

Athlete	Event	Qualification round		Final	
Athlete	Event	Total	Rank	Result	Rank
Lin Ying-shin; Lu Shao-chuan	10 metre air rifle	829.8	5 Q	494.1	(gold) GR
Yang Kun-pi; Lin Yi-chun	Trap	146	1 Q, QWR	42	2nd place, silver medalist(s)

== Softball ==
Summary

Team	Event	Group Stage		Semifinal	Bronze medal game	Final	
Team	Event	Opposition Score	Rank	Opposition Score	Opposition Score	Opposition Score	Rank
Chinese Taipei women's	Women's tournament	South Korea: W 3–2; Japan: L 1–3; Indonesia: W 14–0; China: L 0–5; Hong Kong: W 6–1; Philippines: W 3–2	4 Q	Philippines; W 6–3	match for final China; W 5–4	Japan; L 0–7	2nd place, silver medalist(s)

Roster

- Chen Chia-yi
- Chen Miao-yi
- Chiu An-ju
- Lai Meng-ting
- Li Szu-shih
- Lin Chih-ying
- Lin Feng-chen
- Lin Pei-chun
- Lin Su-hua
- Lin Ying-hsin
- Liu Hsuan
- Shih Ching-ping
- Su Yi-hsuan
- Tsai Chia-chen
- Tu Ya-ting
- Yang Yi-ting
- Yen Yi

Preliminary round

Final round
Eliminated

The top four teams will advance to the Final round.

Team	W	L	RS	RA	WIN%	GB	Tiebreaker
Japan	6	0	59	3	1.000	–	
China	4	2	30	16	0.667	2	1–1; RA = 1
Philippines	4	2	20	17	0.667	2	1–1; RA = 3
Chinese Taipei	4	2	27	13	0.667	2	1–1; RA = 7
South Korea	2	4	15	23	0.333	4	
Indonesia	1	5	15	41	0.167	5	
Hong Kong	0	6	2	55	0.000	6	

August 19; 15:00	South Korea	2–3	Chinese Taipei	GBK Softball field
August 19; 15:00		Boxscore		GBK Softball field

August 20; 10:00	Chinese Taipei	1–3	Japan	GBK Softball field
August 20; 10:00		Boxscore		GBK Softball field

August 20; 17:30	Indonesia	0–14	Chinese Taipei	GBK Softball field
August 20; 17:30		Boxscore		GBK Softball field

August 21; 20:00	China	5–0	Chinese Taipei	GBK Softball field
August 21; 20:00		Boxscore		GBK Softball field

August 22; 15:00	Chinese Taipei	6–1	Hong Kong	GBK Softball field
August 22; 15:00		Boxscore		GBK Softball field

August 22; 20:00	Philippines	2–3	Chinese Taipei	GBK Softball field
August 22; 20:00		Boxscore		GBK Softball field

Semifinal

August 23 18:00 at GBK Softball field
Team	1	2	3	4	5	6	7	R	H	E
Chinese Taipei	1	0	0	2	3	0	0	6	12	2
Philippines	1	0	0	0	2	0	0	3	7	0
WP: Tu Ya-ting LP: Sierra Arlyna Lange; Boxscore

Bronze medal match

August 24 10:00 at GBK Softball field
Team	1	2	3	4	5	6	7	8	R	H	E
Chinese Taipei	1	0	0	0	3	0	0	1	5	10	0
China	1	2	0	0	0	1	0	0	4	9	0
WP: Chiu An-ju LP: Wang Lan; Boxscore

Final

August 24 15:00 at GBK Softball field
Team	1	2	3	4	5	6	7	R	H	E
Chinese Taipei	0	0	0	0	0	X	X	0	1	1
Japan	3	4	0	0	X	X	X	7	5	0
WP: Yukiko Ueno LP: Tu Yating; Boxscore

== Soft tennis ==
=== Men ===
Athlete	Event	Group stage				Quarterfinals	Semifinals	Final	
Athlete	Event	Opposition Score	Opposition Score	Opposition Score	Rank	Opposition Score	Opposition Score	Opposition Score	Rank
Chen Yu-hsun	Singles	Trần Văn Chiến (VIE); W 4–0	Palinya Inthalangsy (LAO); W 4–1	Koichi Nagee (JPN); L 3–4	2	Did not advance			
Chen Tsung-wen	Singles	—N/a	Jitender Mehlda (IND); W 4–1	Ri Chung-il (PRK); L 3–4	2	Did not advance			
Chen Yu-hsun; Chen Tsung-wen; Kuo Chien-chun; Lin Wei-chieh; Yu Kai-wen	Team	Mongolia; W 3–0	Vietnam; W 3–0	Thailand; W 2–1	1 Q	Philippines; W 2–0	Japan; L 0–2	Did not advance	3rd place, bronze medalist(s)

=== Women ===
Athlete	Event	Group stage				Quarterfinals	Semifinals	Final	
Athlete	Event	Opposition Score	Opposition Score	Opposition Score	Rank	Opposition Score	Opposition Score	Opposition Score	Rank
Chen Tsung-wen	Singles	Tran Thanh Hoang Ngan (VIE); W 4–0	Wang Yu-fei (CHN); W 4–0	Hong Ji-sun (PRK); W 4–1	1 Q	Kurumi Onoue (JPN); W 4–0	Dwi Rahayu Pitri (INA); W 4–2	Noa Takahashi (JPN); L 3–4	2nd place, silver medalist(s)
Lee Ching-wen	Singles	—N/a	Sunatcha Kraiya (THA); W 4–1	Noa Takahashi (JPN); L 0–4	2	Did not advance			
Chan Chia-hsin; Cheng Chu-ling; Huang Shih-yuan; Kuo Chien-chi; Lee Ching-wen	Team	—N/a	China; W 2–1	Philippines; W 3–0	1 Q	Thailand; W 2–0	Japan; L 0–2	Did not advance	3rd place, bronze medalist(s)

=== Mixed ===
Athlete	Event	Group stage				Quarterfinals	Semifinals	Final	
Athlete	Event	Opposition Score	Opposition Score	Opposition Score	Rank	Opposition Score	Opposition Score	Opposition Score	Rank
Yu Kai-wen; Cheng Chu-ling	Doubles	—N/a	Rohit Dhiman / Aadhya Tiwari (IND); W 5–0	Chittakone Xaiyalin / Phonesamai Champamanivong (LAO); W 5–0	1 Q	Kento Masuda / Rurika Kuroki (JPN); W 5–2	Kim Beom-jun / Kim Ji-yeon (KOR); W 5–1	Kim Ki-sung / Mun Hye-gyeong (KOR); W 5–3	1st place, gold medalist(s)
Kuo Chien-chun; Kuo Chien-chi	Doubles	—N/a	Muhammad Nauman Aftab / Marium Shahid (PAK); W 5–0	Irfandi Hendrawan / Dede Tari Kusrini (INA); W 5–1	1 Q	Kim Ki-sung / Mun Hye-gyeong (KOR); L 2–5	Did not advance		

== Sport climbing ==
Speed

Athlete	Event	Qualification		Round of 16	Quarterfinals	Semifinals	Final / BM	
Athlete	Event	Best	Rank	Opposition Time	Opposition Time	Opposition Time	Opposition Time	Rank
Lee Hung-ying	Women's	9.545	7 Q	F Ito (JPN); W 9.347–10.366	P Lestari (INA); L FS	did not advance		8

Combined

Athlete	Event	Qualification					Final				
Athlete	Event	Speed Point	Boulder Point	Lead Point	Total	Rank	Speed Point	Boulder Point	Lead Point	Total	Rank
Lee Hung-ying	Women's	5	6	8	240	5 Q	3	5	5	75	6

== Swimming ==
=== Men ===
Event	Athlete	Heats		Final	
Event	Athlete	Time	Rank	Time	Rank
50 m freestyle	Lin Chien-liang	22.60	6 Q	22.67	8
50 m freestyle	Wu Chun-feng	22.95	14	Did not advance	
100 m freestyle	An Ting-yao	50.46	17	Did not advance	
100 m freestyle	Wang Yu-lian	50.52	18	Did not advance	
200 m freestyle	An Ting-yao	1:52:38	16	Did not advance	
800 m freestyle	Huang Guo-ting	—N/a		8:12.15	10
800 m freestyle	Cho Cheng-chi	—N/a		8:16.63	12
1500 m freestyle	Huang Guo-ting	—N/a		15:36.52	8
1500 m freestyle	Cho Cheng-chi	—N/a		15:50.94	12
50 m backstroke	Chuang Mu-lun	26.52	15	Did not advance	
50 m backstroke	Chang Hou-chi	26.67	18	Did not advance	
100 m backstroke	Chuang Mu-lun	56.56	12	Did not advance	
100 m backstroke	Chang Hou-chi	57.83	15	Did not advance	
200 m backstroke	Chuang Mu-lan	2:06.56	10	Did not advance	
200 m backstroke	Chang Hou-chi	2:07.58	13	Did not advance	
50 m breaststroke	Wu Chun-feng	28.42	14	Did not advance	
50 m butterfly	Lin Chien-liang	24.74	15	Did not advance	
50 m butterfly	Chu Chen-ping	24.84	16	Did not advance	
100 m butterfly	Chu Chen-ping	50.98	10	Did not advance	
100 m butterfly	Wang Kuan-hung	54.98	18	Did not advance	
200 m butterfly	Wang Kuan-hung	1:58.73	6 Q	1:58.63	7
200 m individual medley	Wang Hsing-hao	2:02.18	5 Q	2:02.68	7
400 m individual medley	Cho Cheng-chi	4:23.01	6 Q	4:23.39	7
400 m individual medley	Wang Hsing-hao	4:27.99	9	Did not advance	
4 × 100 m freestyle relay	Lin Chien-liang; Huang Yen-hsin; An Ting-yao; Wang Yu-lian	3:21.93	5 Q	3:19.02	5
4 × 200 m freestyle relay	An Ting-yao; Huang Yen-hsin; Wang Yu-lian; Wang Hsing-hao	7:31.61	6 Q	7:24.48	5
4 × 100 m medley relay	Chuang Mu-lun; Lee Hsuan-yen; Chu Chen-ping; An Ting-yao	3:34.96	7 Q	3:41.52	7

=== Women ===
Event	Athlete	Heats		Final	
Event	Athlete	Time	Rank	Time	Rank
50 m breaststroke	Lin Pei-wun	31.77	7 Q	31.72	6
100 m breaststroke	Lin Pei-wun	1:09.63	9	Did not advance	
200 m breaststroke	Lin Pei-wun	2:35.16	8 Q	2:33.39	7
50 m butterfly	Huang Mei-chien	26.98	5 Q	26.89	7
50 m butterfly	Chen Yu-rong	27.35	10	Did not advance	
100 m butterfly	Chen Yu-rong	1:01.33	12	Did not advance	
100 m butterfly	Huang Mei-chien	1:02.93	16	Did not advance	

=== Mixed ===
Event	Athlete	Heats		Final	
Event	Athlete	Time	Rank	Time	Rank
4 × 100 m medley relay	Chuang Mu-lan; Lee Hsuan-yen; Huang Mei-chien; Chen Yu-rong	3:58.31	6 Q	3:58.30	6

== Table tennis ==
=== Singles and doubles ===
Athlete	Event	Round of 64	Round of 32	Round of 16	Quarterfinal	Semifinal	Final	
Athlete	Event	Opposition Score	Opposition Score	Opposition Score	Opposition Score	Opposition Score	Opposition Score	Rank
Chuang Chih-yuan	Men's singles	Bye	Erdenebayar Chinbat (MGL); W 4–0	Sharath Kamal (IND); W 4–2	Lee Sang-su (KOR); L 2–4	Did not advance		
Chen Chien-an	Men's singles	Bye	Padasak Tanviriyavechakul (THA); W 4–1	Wong Chun Ting (HKG); L 2–4	Did not advance			
Cheng I-ching	Women's singles	Bye	Bolor-Erdene Batmunkh (MGL); W 4–0	Minami Ando (JPN); W 4–2	Yu Mengyu (SGP); L 1–4	Did not advance		
Chen Szu-yu	Women's singles	Bye	Mouma Das (IND); W 4–0	Chen Meng (CHN); L 0–4	Did not advance			
Chen Chien-an; Cheng I-ching	Mixed doubles	Bye	Wang Chun / Cheong Cheng-i (MAC); W 3–0	Padasak Tanviriyavechakul / Suthasini Sawettabut (THA); W 3–1	Ho Kwan Kit / Lee Ho Ching (HKG); L 0–3	Did not advance		
Chuang Chih-yuan; Chen Szu-yu	Mixed doubles	Bye	Munkhzorig Jargalsaikhan / Bolor-Erdene Batmunkh (MGL); W 3–0	An Ji-song / Cha Hyo-sim (PRK); L 0–3	Did not advance			

=== Team ===
Athlete	Event	Group stage					Quarterfinal	Semifinal	Final	
Athlete	Event	Opposition Score	Opposition Score	Opposition Score	Opposition Score	Rank	Opposition Score	Opposition Score	Opposition Score	Rank
Chuang Chih-yuan; Chen Chien-an; Liao Cheng-ting; Lin Yun-ju; Lee Chia-sheng	Men's team	Macau; W 3–0	Vietnam; W 3–0	India; W 3–2	United Arab Emirates; W 3–0	1 Q	Iran; W 3–0	China; L 1–3	Did not advance	3rd place, bronze medalist(s)
Cheng I-ching; Chen Szu-yu; Cheng Hsien-tzu; Liu Hsing-yin; Lin Chia-hui	Women's team	—N/a	Macau; W 3–0	South Korea; L 1–3	Indonesia; W 3–1	2 Q	North Korea; L 1–3	Did not advance		

== Taekwondo ==
Poomsae

Athlete	Event	Round of 16	Quarterfinal	Semifinal	Final	
Athlete	Event	Opposition Score	Opposition Score	Opposition Score	Opposition Score	Rank
Chen Ching	Men's individual	Kamal Shrestha (NEP); W 8.38–7.51	Hu Mingda (CHN); W 8.31–8.15	Kourosh Bakhtiar (IRI); L 8.48–8.57	Did not advance	3rd place, bronze medalist(s)
Chang Wei-chieh; Ma Yun-zhong; Chen Po-kai	Men's team	Uzbekistan; WO	Vietnam; L 8.26–8.39	did not advance		
Liao Wen-hsuan	Women's individual	Parbati Gurung (NEP); W 8.10–7.54	Yun Ji-hye (KOR); L 8.30–8.52	did not advance		
Chen Hsiang-ting; Chen Yi-hsuan; Lin Kan-yu	Women's team	Bye	Nepal; W 8.19–7.42	Thailand; L 7.69–7.95	Did not advance	3rd place, bronze medalist(s)

Kyorugi

Athlete	Event	Round of 32	Round of 16	Quarterfinal	Semifinal	Final	
Athlete	Event	Opposition Score	Opposition Score	Opposition Score	Opposition Score	Opposition Score	Rank
Hou Kuang-wu	Men's −58 kg	Reinaldy Atmanegara (INA); W 40–16	Niyaz Pulatov (UZB); L 28–30	Did not advance			
Ho Chia-hsin	Men's −63 kg	Bye	Hassan Shubbar (UAE); W 22–1	Kazybek Baktiyaruly (KAZ); W 21–0	Zhao Shuai (CHN); L 7–8	Did not advance	3rd place, bronze medalist(s)
Huang Yu-jen	Men's −68 kg	Bye	Ghazi Mushabbab Alasmari (KSA); W 22–2	Amirmohammad Bakhshikalhori (IRI); L 13–15	Did not advance		
Liu Wei-ting	Men's −80 kg	Bye	Nurlan Myrzabayev (KAZ); L 1–3	Did not advance			
Yang Tsung-yeh	Men's +80 kg	—N/a	Rizky Anugrah Prasetyo (INA); W 23−3	Hamza Kattan (JOR); L 12−24	Did not advance		
Hung Yu-ting	Women's −49 kg	Dhean Titania Fajrin (INA); W 13–4	Panipak Wongpattanakit (THA); L 1–26	Did not advance			
Su Po-ya	Women's −53 kg	Bye	Kiyoko Nagano (JPN); W 26–6	Law Sin Yi (HKG); W 38–4	Fariza Aldangorova (KAZ); W 11–6	Ha Min-ah (KOR); W 29–10	1st place, gold medalist(s)
Lin Yi-ching	Women's −57 kg	Bye	Rama Abu-Al-Rub (JOR); W 2−0	Vipawan Siripornpermsak (THA); L 16−37	Did not advance		
Chen Yann-yeu	Women's −67 kg	—N/a	Zhang Mengyu (CHN); L 8–10	Did not advance			
Ma Ting-hsia	Women's +67 kg	—N/a	Rodali Barua (IND); W 5−0	Gao Pan (CHN); L 0−3	Did not advance		

== Tennis ==
Men

Athlete	Event	Round of 64	Round of 32	Round of 16	Quarterfinals	Semifinals	Final	
Athlete	Event	Opposition Score	Opposition Score	Opposition Score	Opposition Score	Opposition Score	Opposition Score	Rank
Jason Jung	Singles	Bye	A H Badi (IRI); W 6–0, 6–2	W Trongcharoenchaikul (THA); W 6–4, 6–3	Lee D-h (KOR); L 3–6, 5–7	Did not advance		
Yang Tsung-hua	Singles	Bye	H Habib (LBN); W 6–3, 7–6^{(8–6)}	Kwon S-w (KOR); L 2–6, 6–0, 6–3	Did not advance			
Chen Ti; Peng Hsien-yin	Doubles	—N/a	F Alcantara / J Patrombon (PHI); W 4–6, 7–6^{(7–5)}, [10–7]	S Nagal / R Ramanathan (IND); L 7–6^{(7–5)}, 7–6^{(7–2)}	Did not advance			
Hsieh Cheng-peng; Yang Tsung-hua	Doubles	—N/a	M A A Khan Akbar / A Khan (PAK); W 6–3, 6–1	S Fayziev / J Karimov (UZB); W 6–4, 6–3	R Bopanna / D Sharan (IND); L 3–6, 7–5, [1–10]	Did not advance		

Women

Athlete	Event	Round of 64	Round of 32	Round of 16	Quarterfinals	Semifinals	Final	
Athlete	Event	Opposition Score	Opposition Score	Opposition Score	Opposition Score	Opposition Score	Opposition Score	Rank
Liang En-shuo	Singles	Bye	S Mansoor (PAK); W 6–1, 6–0	K Thandi (IND); W 2–6, 6–4, 7–6^{(7–4)}	Zhang L (HKG); W 6–2, 6–0	Wang Q (CHN); L 1–6, 3–6	Did not advance	3rd place, bronze medalist(s)
Chang Kai-chen	Singles	Bye	U Suhail (PAK); W 6–3, 6–1	E Chong (HKG); L 0–6, 2–6	Did not advance			
Chan Hao-ching; Latisha Chan	Doubles	—N/a		T Naklo / M Sawangkaew (THA); W 6–3, 6–1	E Hayashi / M Uchijima (JPN); W 4–6, 7–5, [10–5]	G Ainitdinova / A Danilina (KAZ); W 6−0, 6−0	Xu YF / Yang ZX (CHN); L 2–6, 6–1, [9–11]	2nd place, silver medalist(s)
Hsu Chieh-yu; Lee Pei-chi	Doubles	S Sharipova / I Tulyaganova (UZB); L 1^{r}–2	Did not advance					

Mixed

Athlete	Event	Round of 64	Round of 32	Round of 16	Quarterfinals	Semifinals	Final	
Athlete	Event	Opposition Score	Opposition Score	Opposition Score	Opposition Score	Opposition Score	Opposition Score	Rank
Liang En-shuo; Peng Hsien-yin	Doubles	Bye	Z Abdul Rasheed / A S Waheed (MDV); W 6–0, 6–1	M Ninomiya / Y Uchiyama (JPN); L 4–6, 4–6	Did not advance			
Chang Kai-chen; Hsieh Cheng-peng	Doubles	Bye	I Tulyaganova / F Dustov (UZB); W 6–1, 6–4	E Hayashi / K Uesugi (JPN); L 6–7^{(2–7)}, 7–6^{(7–5)}, [10–12]	Did not advance			

== Triathlon ==
Men

Athlete	Swim 1.5 km	Trans. 1	Bike 40 km	Trans. 2	Run 10 km	Total time	Rank
Chang Tuan-chun	19.53	0.28	56.50	0.23	33:44	1:51:18	5
Wang Wei-kai	20:07	0:28	56:39	0:24	37:42	1:55:20	15

Women

Athlete	Swim 1.5 km	Trans. 1	Bike 40 km	Trans. 2	Run 10 km	Total time	Rank
Kuo Jia-chi	20:21	0:28	1:02:01	0:25	42:28	2:05:43	8
Chiang Chi-wen	20:20	0.27	1:02:07	0:30	45:19	2:08:43	10

Mixed

Team	Swim 300 m	Trans. 1	Bike 6.7 km	Trans. 2	Run 1.95 km (1st–3rd) 1.78 km (4th)	Total time	Rank
Chinese Taipei	18:26	2:50	41:55	2:33	28:20	1:33:44	5
Kuo Jia-chi	4:24	0:41	10:50	0:37	7:28	24:00	
Lin Wei-chih	4:22	0:40	10:00	0:34	6:37	22:13	
Chang Chi-wan	4:51	0:46	11:04	0:40	8:01	25:22	
Chang Tuan-chun	4:29	0:43	10:01	0:42	6:14	22:09	

== Volleyball ==
Chinese Taipei Volleyball Association entered their athletes to compete in the beach and indoor volleyball competition.

=== Beach volleyball ===
Athlete	Event	Preliminary		Round of 16	Quarterfinals	Semifinals	Final / BM	
Athlete	Event	Oppositions Scores	Rank	Opposition Score	Opposition Score	Opposition Score	Opposition Score	Rank
Hsieh Ya-jen; Wang Chin-ju	Men's tournament	Al-Housni – Al Shereiqi (OMA): L 1–2; Asifi – Ahmadi (AFG): W 2–0; Rachmawan – Ashfiya (INA): L 0–2	3	did not advance				
Hsu Chen-wei; Wu Shin-shian	Men's tournament	Gao – Li (CHN): L 0–2; Kuleshov – Babichev (KAZ): L 0–2; Nordin – Saifuddin (MAS): L 1–2	4	did not advance				
Kou Nai-han; Liu Pi-hsin	Women's tournament	Yuen – Au Yeung (HKG): W 2–0; Wang – Xia (CHN): L 0–2; Kim H-j – Kim H-n (KOR): W 2–0	3 Q	Ratnasari – Eka (INA); L 0–2	did not advance			
Yu Ya-hsuan; Pan Tzu-yi	Women's tournament	Wang – Zeng (CHN): L 1–2; Tran – Truong (VIE): W 2–0; Ishii – Murakami (JPN): L 0–2	3 Q	Juliana – Utami (INA); L 1–2	did not advance			

=== Indoor volleyball ===
Team	Event	Group Stage		Playoffs	Quarterfinals / Pl.	Semifinals / Pl.	Final / BM / Pl.	
Team	Event	Oppositions Scores	Rank	Opposition Score	Opposition Score	Opposition Score	Opposition Score	Rank
Chinese Taipei men's	Men's tournament	South Korea: L 2–3; Nepal: W 3–0	2 Q	Bye	Saudi Arabia; W 3–1	South Korea; L 2–3	Qatar; W 3–1	3rd place, bronze medalist(s)
Chinese Taipei women's	Women's tournament	Kazakhstan: L 1–3; China: L 0–3; Vietnam: W 3–2; India: W 3–2; South Korea: L 0–3	5	—N/a	did not advance		India; W 3–0	9

==== Men's tournament ====
Team roster

The following is the Chinese Taipei roster in the men's volleyball tournament of the 2018 Asian Games.

Head coach: Chen Yuan

No.	Name	Date of birth	Height	Weight	Spike	Block	Club
1	Lin Cheng-yang	24 May 1993	1.94 m (6 ft 4 in)	83 kg (183 lb)	350 cm (140 in)	320 cm (130 in)	
2	Liu Hong-jie	10 November 1993	1.89 m (6 ft 2 in)	84 kg (185 lb)	327 cm (129 in)	320 cm (130 in)	(Chinese Taipei) Taichung Bank
3	Li Chia-hsuan	6 September 1993	1.71 m (5 ft 7 in)	70 kg (150 lb)	300 cm (120 in)	270 cm (110 in)	
5	Huang Shih-hao	1 January 1991	1.83 m (6 ft 0 in)	85 kg (187 lb)	320 cm (130 in)	310 cm (120 in)	
6	Tai Ju-chien	14 November 1998	1.84 m (6 ft 0 in)	82 kg (181 lb)	320 cm (130 in)	310 cm (120 in)	(Chinese Taipei) Taichung Bank
7	Liu Hung-min	10 November 1993	1.90 m (6 ft 3 in)	86 kg (190 lb)	325 cm (128 in)	315 cm (124 in)	
10	Su Hou-chen	14 September 1995	1.80 m (5 ft 11 in)	82 kg (181 lb)	310 cm (120 in)	305 cm (120 in)	
11	Wu Tsung-hsuan	9 July 1994	1.86 m (6 ft 1 in)	80 kg (180 lb)	325 cm (128 in)	300 cm (120 in)	(Chinese Taipei) Taichung Bank
12	Hsu Mei-chung	16 October 1991	1.90 m (6 ft 3 in)	90 kg (200 lb)	333 cm (131 in)	300 cm (120 in)	(Chinese Taipei) Taichung Bank
13	Huang Chien-feng	31 December 1990	1.95 m (6 ft 5 in)	90 kg (200 lb)	345 cm (136 in)	332 cm (131 in)	(Chinese Taipei) Taichung Bank
14	Lin Yi-huei	19 February 1997	1.94 m (6 ft 4 in)	85 kg (187 lb)	333 cm (131 in)	320 cm (130 in)	
15	Wang Chien-pin	9 October 1989	1.85 m (6 ft 1 in)	80 kg (180 lb)	315 cm (124 in)	312 cm (123 in)	
16	Shih Hsiu-chih	24 July 1995	1.85 m (6 ft 1 in)	76 kg (168 lb)	320 cm (130 in)	310 cm (120 in)	
19	Chen Chien-chen (c)	20 November 1989	1.88 m (6 ft 2 in)	87 kg (192 lb)	338 cm (133 in)	325 cm (128 in)	(Chinese Taipei) Taichung Bank

Pool D

Pos	Team	Pld	W	L	Pts	SW	SL	SR	SPW	SPL	SPR	Qualification
1	South Korea	2	2	0	5	6	2	3.000	184	147	1.252	Classification for 1–12
2	Chinese Taipei	2	1	1	4	5	3	1.667	179	166	1.078	Classification for 1–12
3	Nepal	2	0	2	0	0	6	0.000	100	150	0.667	Classification for 13–20

Source: OCA

Date	Time		Score		Set 1	Set 2	Set 3	Set 4	Set 5	Total	Report
20 Aug	19:00	Chinese Taipei	2–3	South Korea	21–25	25–21	21–25	25–23	12–15	104–109	Report
22 Aug	12:30	Nepal	0–3	Chinese Taipei	23–25	19–25	15–25			57–75	Report
26 Aug	19:00	Saudi Arabia	1–3	Chinese Taipei	25–22	19–25	8–25	23–25		75–97	Report
30 Aug	16:30	Chinese Taipei	2–3	South Korea	25–20	20–25	16–25	25–20	12–15	98–105	Report
01 Sep	10:00	Chinese Taipei	3–1	Qatar	25–22	25–23	17–25	25–16		92–86	Report

==== Women's tournament ====
Team roster

The following is the Taiwanese roster in the women's volleyball tournament of the 2018 Asian Games.

Head coach: Yao Cheng-shan

No.	Name	Date of birth	Height	Weight	Spike	Block	Club
1	Lai Xiang-chen	19 March 1995	1.53 m (5 ft 0 in)	53 kg (117 lb)	255 cm (100 in)	245 cm (96 in)	(Chinese Taipei) CMFC
3	Hsiao Hsiang-ling	2 January 1993	1.73 m (5 ft 8 in)	63 kg (139 lb)	285 cm (112 in)	273 cm (107 in)	(Chinese Taipei) Attack Line
4	Lee Yu	15 June 1996	1.74 m (5 ft 9 in)	71 kg (157 lb)	272 cm (107 in)	263 cm (104 in)	(Chinese Taipei) Taiwan Power
5	Kuo Ching-yi	17 February 1996	1.68 m (5 ft 6 in)	59 kg (130 lb)	272 cm (107 in)	261 cm (103 in)	(Chinese Taipei) Taiwan Power
6	Hsieh Yi-chen	25 September 1990	1.65 m (5 ft 5 in)	64 kg (141 lb)	265 cm (104 in)	260 cm (100 in)	(Chinese Taipei) Taiwan Power
7	Huang Hsin-yu	25 February 1998	1.79 m (5 ft 10 in)	60 kg (130 lb)	287 cm (113 in)	272 cm (107 in)	(Chinese Taipei) Taiwan Power
9	Chang Li-yun (C)	28 March 1991	1.80 m (5 ft 11 in)	67 kg (148 lb)	268 cm (106 in)	260 cm (100 in)	(Chinese Taipei) Taiwan Power
11	Chen Hsi	15 March 1993	1.77 m (5 ft 10 in)	65 kg (143 lb)	282 cm (111 in)	273 cm (107 in)	(Chinese Taipei) Taiwan Power
12	Yang Meng-hua	15 August 1991	1.70 m (5 ft 7 in)	67 kg (148 lb)	250 cm (98 in)	240 cm (94 in)	(Chinese Taipei) Taiwan Power
15	Lee Tzu-ying	4 July 1994	1.73 m (5 ft 8 in)	67 kg (148 lb)	272 cm (107 in)	260 cm (100 in)	(Chinese Taipei) Taiwan Power
16	Chen Tzu-ya	26 August 1997	1.78 m (5 ft 10 in)	62 kg (137 lb)	266 cm (105 in)	256 cm (101 in)	(Chinese Taipei) CMFC
17	Chang Yu-chia	27 January 1996	1.72 m (5 ft 8 in)	74 kg (163 lb)	266 cm (105 in)	256 cm (101 in)	(Chinese Taipei) Taiwan Power
19	Tseng Wan-ling	13 May 1996	1.71 m (5 ft 7 in)	65 kg (143 lb)	285 cm (112 in)	272 cm (107 in)	(Chinese Taipei) Taiwan Power
20	Huang Ching-hsuan	16 November 1998	1.82 m (6 ft 0 in)	70 kg (150 lb)	286 cm (113 in)	275 cm (108 in)	(Chinese Taipei) Taiwan Power

Pool B

Pos	Team	Pld	W	L	Pts	SW	SL	SR	SPW	SPL	SPR	Qualification
1	China	5	5	0	15	15	0	MAX	375	216	1.736	Quarterfinals
2	South Korea	5	4	1	12	12	4	3.000	382	299	1.278	Quarterfinals
3	Kazakhstan	5	2	3	7	9	10	0.900	386	406	0.951	Quarterfinals
4	Vietnam	5	2	3	6	8	11	0.727	369	406	0.909	Quarterfinals
5	Chinese Taipei	5	2	3	4	7	13	0.538	370	441	0.839	Classification for 9–11
6	India	5	0	5	1	2	15	0.133	292	406	0.719	Classification for 9–11

Source: OCA

Date	Time		Score		Set 1	Set 2	Set 3	Set 4	Set 5	Total	Report
19 Aug	16:30	Chinese Taipei	1–3	Kazakhstan	15–25	10–25	25–20	20–25		70–95	Report
21 Aug	16:30	China	3–0	Chinese Taipei	25–10	25–14	25–14			75–38	Report
23 Aug	12:30	Vietnam	2–3	Chinese Taipei	13–25	25–19	19–25	25–16	11–15	93–100	Report
25 Aug	19:00	India	2–3	Chinese Taipei	25–23	21–25	25–18	18–25	13–15	102–106	Report
27 Aug	19:00	Chinese Taipei	0–3	South Korea	24–26	9–25	23–25			56–76	Report
31 Aug	09:00	Chinese Taipei	3–0	India	25–21	25–16	25–15			75–52	Report

== Weightlifting ==
Men

Athlete	Event	Snatch		Clean & Jerk		Total	Rank
Athlete	Event	Result	Rank	Result	Rank	Total	Rank
Kao Chan-hung	−62 kg	126	9	154	7	280	9
Chiang Tsung-han	−77 kg	140	9	176	6	316	8
Chuang Sheng-min	−77 kg	140	9	170	9	310	12
Chen Po-jen	−94 kg	160	6	190	6	350	6
Chen Shih-chieh	+105 kg	185	6	–	–		NM

Women

Athlete	Event	Snatch		Clean & Jerk		Total	Rank
Athlete	Event	Result	Rank	Result	Rank	Total	Rank
Fang Wan-ling	−48 kg	80	5	96	7	176	6
Kuo Hsing-chun	−58 kg	105	1	133	1	238	1st place, gold medalist(s)
Hung Wan-ting	−69 kg	103	2	130	2	233	2nd place, silver medalist(s)
Liu Lan-yin	−69 kg	99	4	126	5	225	5
Yao Chi-ling	−75 kg	97	5	127	4	224	4

== Wrestling ==
Key:

- F – Victory by fall.
- PP – Decision by points – the loser with technical points.
- PO – Decision by points – the loser without technical points.
- ST – Great superiority – the loser without technical points and a margin of victory of at least 8 (Greco-Roman) or 10 (freestyle) points.

Men

Athlete	Event	Qualification	Round of 16	Quarterfinal	Semifinal	Repechage 1	Repechage 2	Final / BM	
Athlete	Event	Opposition Result	Opposition Result	Opposition Result	Opposition Result	Opposition Result	Opposition Result	Opposition Result	Rank
Wang Ming-liang	Freestyle –74 kg	Bye	Gong Byung-min (KOR); L 4–14	Did not advance					13
Lin Yu-hung	Greco-Roman –60 kg	—N/a	Islomjon Bakhramov (UZB); L 0–10	Did not advance			—N/a	Did not advance	13
Hung Ying-hua	Greco-Roman –67 kg	—N/a	Almat Kebispayev (KAZ); L 2–7	Did not advance		Manish Kundu (IND); WO	—N/a	Mohammad Reza Geraei (IRI); L 0–11	5

Women

Athlete	Event	Round of 16	Quarterfinal	Semifinal	Repechage	Final / BM	
Athlete	Event	Opposition Result	Opposition Result	Opposition Result	Opposition Result	Opposition Result	Rank
Chiu Hsin-ju	Freestyle –53 kg	Bye	Pak Yong-mi (PRK); L 0–6	Did not advance	Bye	Haruna Okuno (JPN); L 0–6	5
Chen Wen-ling	Freestyle –68 kg	Bye	Desi Sinta (INA); W 11–5	Sharkhüügiin Tümentsetseg (MGL); L 0–10	Bye	Divya Kakran (IND); L 0–10	5
Chang Hui-tsz	Freestyle –76 kg	Bye	Hwang Eun-ju (KOR); L 4–4 ^{PP}	did not advance			7

== Wushu ==
Men's sanda

Athlete	Event	Round of 32	Round of 16	Quarterfinals	Semifinals	Final	Rank
Chien Hung-yi	56 kg	—N/a	Phithak Paokrathok (THA); L 1–2	Did not advance			

Men's taolu

Athlete	Event	Result	
Athlete	Event	Score	Rank
Tsai Tse-min	Changquan	9.70	3rd place, bronze medalist(s)

Athlete	Event	Taijiquan		Taijijian		Total	
Athlete	Event	Score	Rank	Score	Rank	Score	Rank
Sun Chia-hung	Taijiquan/Taijijian	9.70	2	9.40	13	19.10	12

Athlete	Event	Nanquan		Nangun		Total	
Athlete	Event	Score	Rank	Score	Rank	Score	Rank
Lai Po-wei	Nanquan/Nangun	9.69	4	9.70	5	19.39	4

Athlete	Event	Daoshu		Gunshu		Total	
Athlete	Event	Score	Rank	Score	Rank	Score	Rank
Wang Chen-ming	Daoshu/Gunshu	9.69	5	9.35	10	19.05	7

Women's sanda

Athlete	Event	Round of 16	Quarterfinals	Semifinals	Final	Rank
Chen Wei-ting	52 kg	Maleesha Madumali Weerasinghe Pathirage (SRI); W 2–0	Zarina Rafique (PAK); W 2–0	Li Yueyao (CHN); L 0–0	Did not advance	3rd place, bronze medalist(s)
Lin Yi-ju	60 kg	Chu Thị Thúy Hằng (VIE); L 1–2	Did not advance			

Women's taolu

Athlete	Event	Result	
Athlete	Event	Score	Rank
Yu Chih-hsuan	Changquan	9.23	8

Athlete	Event	Taijiquan		Taijijian		Total	
Athlete	Event	Score	Rank	Score	Rank	Score	Rank
Chuang Chia-wen	Taijiquan/Taijijian	9.47	13	9.42	12	18.89	12

Athlete	Event	Nanquan		Nandao		Total	
Athlete	Event	Score	Rank	Score	Rank	Score	Rank
Tsai Wen-chuan	Nanquan/Nandao	9.42	8	9.69	2	19.11	5

== Canoe polo ==
Summary

Athlete	Events	Group stage				Semifinals	Final	
Athlete	Events	Opposition Score	Opposition Score	Opposition Score	Rank	Opposition Score	Opposition Score	Rank
Li Yung-hsu; Wu Tung-yang; Chao Tzu-hsing; Chien Shao-hung; Huang Teng-hui; Hsiao Wei-chen	Men's tournament	Thailand; W 15–3	Hong Kong; W 22–0	Japan; L 4–7	2 QSF	Malaysia; L 3–6	Bronze medal match Iran; W 4–3	3rd place, bronze medalist(s)
Chien Chi-yun; Fu Yu-ting; Liao Wan-ju; Hung Yi-fang; Tsai An-chi; Li Heng-yen	Women's tournament	Thailand; W 15–1	Hong Kong; W 13–2	Japan w 7–2	1 QSF	Iran; L 3–6	Bronze medal match Japan; W 11–3	3rd place, bronze medalist(s)

== eSports ==
Athlete	ID	Event	First round	Second round	Third round	Semifinals	Final	
Athlete	ID	Event	Opposition Score	Opposition Score	Opposition Score	Opposition Score	Opposition Score	Rank
Chiu Po-yen; Cheng Ming-jen; Cheng Yu-hsiang; Huang Chien-wei; Lin Chun-ting; Yen Hao-che; Chen Po-cheng	S.T PoChu; S.T Lover; MS Soar; MS Wei; S.T Ting ahq Fanta; MAD OM	Arena of Valor	Indonesia; W 2–0	China; L 0–2	—N/a		China; L 0-2	2nd place, silver medalist(s)
Chiu Po-yen; Cheng Ming-jen; Cheng Yu-hsiang; Huang Chien-wei; Lin Chun-ting; Yen Hao-che; Chen Po-cheng	S.T PoChu; S.T Lover; MS Soar; MS Wei; S.T Ting ahq Fanta; MAD OM	Arena of Valor	—N/a	Loser's bracket Thailand; W 2–1	Loser's bracket Hong Kong; W 2–0	Loser's bracket Vietnam; W 2–0	China; L 0-2	2nd place, silver medalist(s)
Chen Ju-chih; Chen Kuan-ting; Hsieh Yu-ting; Wang You-chun; Chen Kuan-ting; Huang Yi-tang; Lu Yu-hung; Hu Shuo-chieh	WaHorse; REFRA1N; PK baybay Morning; Maple; Betty; SwordArT	League of Legends	Group stage Pakistan; W 2–0	Group stage Indonesia; W 2–0	Group stage Saudi Arabia; W 2–0	China; L 1–2	Bronze medal match Saudi Arabia; W 3–1	3rd place, bronze medalist(s)
Huang Yu-hsiang	Nice	StarCraft II	Amruth Alfred – AmyPie (SRI); W 3–0	—N/a		Trần Hồng Phúc – MeomaikA (VIE); W 3–1	Cho Seong-ju – Maru (KOR); L 0–4	2nd place, silver medalist(s)

== See also ==
- Chinese Taipei at the 2018 Asian Para Games
