= List of Asian Games medalists in bridge =

This is the complete list of Asian Games medalists in contract bridge from 2018 to 2022.

== Events ==
=== Men's pair ===
Games	Gold	Silver	Bronze
2018 Jakarta–Palembang	India (IND); Pranab Bardhan; Shibhnath Sarkar	China (CHN); Yang Lixin; Chen Gang	Hong Kong (HKG); Mak Kwok Fai; Lai Wai Kit
2018 Jakarta–Palembang	India (IND); Pranab Bardhan; Shibhnath Sarkar	China (CHN); Yang Lixin; Chen Gang	Indonesia (INA); Henky Lasut; Freddy Eddy Manoppo

=== Men's team ===
Games	Gold	Silver	Bronze
2018 Jakarta–Palembang	Singapore (SGP); Fong Kien Hoong; Loo Choon Chou; Desmond Oh; Kelvin Ong; Poon Hua; Zhang Yukun	Hong Kong (HKG); Lai Wai Kit; Lau Pik Kin; Mak Kwok Fai; Ng Chi Cheung; Wan Siu Kau; Zen Wei Peu	China (CHN); Chen Gang; Ju Chuancheng; Shi Haojun; Shi Zhengjun; Yang Lixin; Zhuang Zejun
2018 Jakarta–Palembang	Singapore (SGP); Fong Kien Hoong; Loo Choon Chou; Desmond Oh; Kelvin Ong; Poon Hua; Zhang Yukun	Hong Kong (HKG); Lai Wai Kit; Lau Pik Kin; Mak Kwok Fai; Ng Chi Cheung; Wan Siu Kau; Zen Wei Peu	India (IND); Ajay Khare; Debabrata Majumder; Sumit Mukherjee; Jaggy Shivdasani; Rajeshwar Tiwari; Raju Tolani
2022 Hangzhou	Hong Kong (HKG); Chiu Wai Lap; Ho Hoi Tung; Ho Wai Lam; Lai Wai Kit; Mak Kwok Fai; Sze Shun Sum	India (IND); Ajay Khare; Sumit Mukherjee; Jaggy Shivdasani; Sandeep Thakral; Rajeshwar Tiwari; Raju Tolani	China (CHN); Hu Linlin; Ju Chuancheng; Liu Jing; Liu Yinghao; Zhuang Zejun
2022 Hangzhou	Hong Kong (HKG); Chiu Wai Lap; Ho Hoi Tung; Ho Wai Lam; Lai Wai Kit; Mak Kwok Fai; Sze Shun Sum	India (IND); Ajay Khare; Sumit Mukherjee; Jaggy Shivdasani; Sandeep Thakral; Rajeshwar Tiwari; Raju Tolani	Japan (JPN); Kazuo Furuta; Hiroaki Miura; Masayuki Tanaka; Hiroki Yokoi

=== Women's pair ===
Games	Gold	Silver	Bronze
2018 Jakarta–Palembang	China (CHN); Ran Jingrong; Wu Shaohong	Chinese Taipei (TPE); Wu Yu-fang; Tsai Wen-chuan	China (CHN); Huang Yan; Wang Nan
2018 Jakarta–Palembang	China (CHN); Ran Jingrong; Wu Shaohong	Chinese Taipei (TPE); Wu Yu-fang; Tsai Wen-chuan	Hong Kong (HKG); Yeung Hoi Ning; Pearlie Chan

=== Women's team ===
Games	Gold	Silver	Bronze
2022 Hangzhou	China (CHN); Huang Yan; Liu Yan; Ran Jingrong; Yu Xiuting	Chinese Taipei (TPE); Chen Yin-shou; Hsiao Kuan-chu; Lin Yin-yu; Liu Lin-chin; Liu Pei-hua; Yang Ming-ching	Hong Kong (HKG); Pearlie Chan; Charmian Koo; Tang Tsz In; Joyce Tung; Flora Wong; Yeung Hoi Ning
2022 Hangzhou	China (CHN); Huang Yan; Liu Yan; Ran Jingrong; Yu Xiuting	Chinese Taipei (TPE); Chen Yin-shou; Hsiao Kuan-chu; Lin Yin-yu; Liu Lin-chin; Liu Pei-hua; Yang Ming-ching	Singapore (SGP); Leong Jia Min; Li Lan; Lim Jing Xuan; Low Siok Hui; Jazlene Ong; Selene Tan

=== Mixed pair ===
Games	Gold	Silver	Bronze
2018 Jakarta–Palembang	Chinese Taipei (TPE); Yang Hsin-lung; Lu Yi-zu	Chinese Taipei (TPE); Fan Kang-wei; Tsai Po-ya	Indonesia (INA); Taufik Gautama Asbi; Lusje Olha Bojoh
2018 Jakarta–Palembang	Chinese Taipei (TPE); Yang Hsin-lung; Lu Yi-zu	Chinese Taipei (TPE); Fan Kang-wei; Tsai Po-ya	Thailand (THA); Terasak Jitngamkusol; Taristchollatorn Chodchoy

=== Mixed team ===
Games	Gold	Silver	Bronze
2018 Jakarta–Palembang	China (CHN); Li Liang; Xun Yonghong; Zhang Yizhuo; Hu Wen; Yang Jinghui; Zhu Aiping	Thailand (THA); Somchai Baisamut; Terasak Jitngamkusol; Kridsadayut Plengsap; Taristchollatorn Chodchoy; Kanokporn Janebunjong; Chodchoy Sophonpanich	Indonesia (INA); Taufik Gautama Asbi; Bill Mondigir; Robert Parasian; Lusje Olha Bojoh; Elvita Lasut; Julita Grace Joice Tueje
2018 Jakarta–Palembang	China (CHN); Li Liang; Xun Yonghong; Zhang Yizhuo; Hu Wen; Yang Jinghui; Zhu Aiping	Thailand (THA); Somchai Baisamut; Terasak Jitngamkusol; Kridsadayut Plengsap; Taristchollatorn Chodchoy; Kanokporn Janebunjong; Chodchoy Sophonpanich	India (IND); Rajeev Khandelwal; Gopinath Manna; Bachiraju Satyanarayana; Hema Deora; Himani Khandelwal; Kiran Nadar
2022 Hangzhou	Chinese Taipei (TPE); Fan Kang-wei; Liu Ming-chien; Wu Tzu-lin; Chen Kuan-hsuan; So Ho-yee; Tsai Po-ya	China (CHN); Chen Yichao; Dai Jianming; Hu Junjie; Fu Bo; Wang Jian; Zhang Yu	Singapore (SGP); Loo Choon Chou; Luo Cheng; Gideon Tan; Lam Ze Ying; Seet Choon Cheng; Tan Sock Ngin
2022 Hangzhou	Chinese Taipei (TPE); Fan Kang-wei; Liu Ming-chien; Wu Tzu-lin; Chen Kuan-hsuan; So Ho-yee; Tsai Po-ya	China (CHN); Chen Yichao; Dai Jianming; Hu Junjie; Fu Bo; Wang Jian; Zhang Yu	Thailand (THA); Panjaroon Jariyanuntanaet; Kirawat Limsinsopon; Kridsadayut Plengsap; Wanna Amornmeswarintara; Kanokporn Janebunjong; Pavinee Sitthicharoensawat

=== Supermixed team ===
Games	Gold	Silver	Bronze
2018 Jakarta–Palembang	China (CHN); Fu Zhong; Hou Xu; Li Jie; Liu Jing; Shen Qi; Wang Wenfei	Hong Kong (HKG); Ho Hoi Tung; Ho Wai Lam; Pearlie Chan; Charmian Koo; Flora Wong; Yeung Hoi Ning	Indonesia (INA); Jemmy Boyke Bojoh; Michael Bambang Hartono; Franky Steven Karwur; Bert Toar Polii; Rury Andhani; Conny Eufke Sumampouw
2018 Jakarta–Palembang	China (CHN); Fu Zhong; Hou Xu; Li Jie; Liu Jing; Shen Qi; Wang Wenfei	Hong Kong (HKG); Ho Hoi Tung; Ho Wai Lam; Pearlie Chan; Charmian Koo; Flora Wong; Yeung Hoi Ning	Chinese Taipei (TPE); Liu Ming-chien; Wang Shao-yu; Chen Yin-shou; Lin Yin-yu; Liu Pei-hua; So Ho-yee
