= Bridge at the Asian Games =

- Governing bodies: WBF (World) / APBF (Asia)
- Events: 3 (men: 1; women: 1; mixed: 1)

Games
- 1951; 1954; 1958; 1962; 1966; 1970; 1974; 1978; 1982; 1986; 1990; 1994; 1998; 2002; 2006; 2010; 2014; 2018; 2022; 2026
- Medalists

Contract bridge became a medal sport at the 2018 Asian Games, and in 2019, during Olympic Council of Asia's General Assembly it was decided the return of the sport in the 2022 Asian Games, which was held in Hangzhou, China.

== Editions ==
Games	Year	Host city	Best nation
XVI	2018	Jakarta–Palembang, Indonesia	China
XIX	2022	Hangzhou, China	China

== Events ==
Event	18	22	Years
Men's pair	X		1
Men's team	X	X	2
Women's pair	X		1
Women's team		X	1
Mixed pair	X		1
Mixed team	X	X	2
Mixed super team	X		1
Total	6	3	

== Medal table ==
Rank	Nation	Gold	Silver	Bronze	Total
1	China (CHN)	4	2	3	9
2	Chinese Taipei (TPE)	2	3	1	6
3	Hong Kong (HKG)	1	2	3	6
4	India (IND)	1	1	2	4
5	Singapore (SGP)	1	0	2	3
6	Thailand (THA)	0	1	2	3
7	Indonesia (INA)	0	0	4	4
8	Japan (JPN)	0	0	1	1
Totals (8 entries)		9	9	18	36

== Participating nations ==
Nation	18	22	Years
Bangladesh	5	5	2
China	24	15	2
Chinese Taipei	18	18	2
Hong Kong	16	18	2
India	24	18	2
Indonesia	22	12	2
Japan	12	8	2
Jordan	10		1
Malaysia	10		1
Pakistan	11	11	2
Philippines	12	12	2
Saudi Arabia	4		1
Singapore	24	18	2
South Korea		18	1
Thailand	21	18	2
Number of nations	14	12	
Number of athletes	213	171	
