= Bridge at the 2018 Asian Games =

- Venue: Jakarta International Expo
- Dates: 21 August – 1 September 2018
- Competitors: 213 from 14 nations

Contract bridge at the 2018 Asian Games was held at the Jakarta International Expo, Jakarta, Indonesia from 21 August to 1 September 2018.

China finished first in the medal table by winning 3 gold medals.

== Schedule ==
Q	Qualification	S	Semifinals	F	Finals

Event↓/Date →	21st Tue	22nd Wed	23rd Thu	24th Fri	25th Sat	26th Sun	27th Mon	28th Tue	29th Wed	30th Thu	31st Fri		1st Sat
Men's pair								Q	Q	S	S	F	F
Men's team	Q	Q	Q	Q	Q	S	F						
Women's pair								Q	Q	S	S	F	F
Mixed pair								Q	Q	S	S	F	F
Mixed team	Q	Q	Q	Q	Q	S	F						
Supermixed team	Q	Q	Q	Q	Q	S	F						

== Medalists ==
Event	Gold	Silver	Bronze
Men's pair	India; Pranab Bardhan; Shibhnath Sarkar	China; Yang Lixin; Chen Gang	Indonesia; Henky Lasut; Freddy Eddy Manoppo
Men's pair	India; Pranab Bardhan; Shibhnath Sarkar	China; Yang Lixin; Chen Gang	Hong Kong; Mak Kwok Fai; Lai Wai Kit
Men's team	Singapore; Fong Kien Hoong; Loo Choon Chou; Desmond Oh; Kelvin Ong; Poon Hua; Zhang Yukun	Hong Kong; Lai Wai Kit; Lau Pik Kin; Mak Kwok Fai; Ng Chi Cheung; Wan Siu Kau; Zen Wei Peu	India; Ajay Khare; Debabrata Majumder; Sumit Mukherjee; Jaggy Shivdasani; Rajeshwar Tiwari; Raju Tolani
Men's team	Singapore; Fong Kien Hoong; Loo Choon Chou; Desmond Oh; Kelvin Ong; Poon Hua; Zhang Yukun	Hong Kong; Lai Wai Kit; Lau Pik Kin; Mak Kwok Fai; Ng Chi Cheung; Wan Siu Kau; Zen Wei Peu	China; Chen Gang; Ju Chuancheng; Shi Haojun; Shi Zhengjun; Yang Lixin; Zhuang Zejun
Women's pair	China; Ran Jingrong; Wu Shaohong	Chinese Taipei; Wu Yu-fang; Tsai Wen-chuan	Hong Kong; Yeung Hoi Ning; Pearlie Chan
Women's pair	China; Ran Jingrong; Wu Shaohong	Chinese Taipei; Wu Yu-fang; Tsai Wen-chuan	China; Huang Yan; Wang Nan
Mixed pair	Chinese Taipei; Yang Hsin-lung; Lu Yi-zu	Chinese Taipei; Fan Kang-wei; Tsai Po-ya	Indonesia; Taufik Gautama Asbi; Lusje Olha Bojoh
Mixed pair	Chinese Taipei; Yang Hsin-lung; Lu Yi-zu	Chinese Taipei; Fan Kang-wei; Tsai Po-ya	Thailand; Terasak Jitngamkusol; Taristchollatorn Chodchoy
Mixed team	China; Li Liang; Xun Yonghong; Zhang Yizhuo; Hu Wen; Yang Jinghui; Zhu Aiping	Thailand; Somchai Baisamut; Terasak Jitngamkusol; Kridsadayut Plengsap; Taristchollatorn Chodchoy; Kanokporn Janebunjong; Chodchoy Sophonpanich	India; Rajeev Khandelwal; Gopinath Manna; Bachiraju Satyanarayana; Hema Deora; Himani Khandelwal; Kiran Nadar
Mixed team	China; Li Liang; Xun Yonghong; Zhang Yizhuo; Hu Wen; Yang Jinghui; Zhu Aiping	Thailand; Somchai Baisamut; Terasak Jitngamkusol; Kridsadayut Plengsap; Taristchollatorn Chodchoy; Kanokporn Janebunjong; Chodchoy Sophonpanich	Indonesia; Taufik Gautama Asbi; Bill Mondigir; Robert Parasian; Lusje Olha Bojoh; Elvita Lasut; Julita Grace Joice Tueje
Supermixed team	China; Fu Zhong; Hou Xu; Li Jie; Liu Jing; Shen Qi; Wang Wenfei	Hong Kong; Ho Hoi Tung; Ho Wai Lam; Pearlie Chan; Charmian Koo; Flora Wong; Yeung Hoi Ning	Chinese Taipei; Liu Ming-chien; Wang Shao-yu; Chen Yin-shou; Lin Yin-yu; Liu Pei-hua; So Ho-yee
Supermixed team	China; Fu Zhong; Hou Xu; Li Jie; Liu Jing; Shen Qi; Wang Wenfei	Hong Kong; Ho Hoi Tung; Ho Wai Lam; Pearlie Chan; Charmian Koo; Flora Wong; Yeung Hoi Ning	Indonesia; Jemmy Boyke Bojoh; Michael Bambang Hartono; Franky Steven Karwur; Bert Toar Polii; Rury Andhani; Conny Eufke Sumampouw

== Medal table ==
Rank	Nation	Gold	Silver	Bronze	Total
1	China (CHN)	3	1	2	6
2	Chinese Taipei (TPE)	1	2	1	4
3	India (IND)	1	0	2	3
4	Singapore (SGP)	1	0	0	1
5	Hong Kong (HKG)	0	2	2	4
6	Thailand (THA)	0	1	1	2
7	Indonesia (INA)	0	0	4	4
Totals (7 entries)		6	6	12	24

== Participating nations ==
A total of 213 athletes from 14 nations competed in bridge at the 2018 Asian Games:

- Bangladesh (5)
- China (24)
- Chinese Taipei (18)
- Hong Kong (16)
- India (24)
- Indonesia (22)
- Japan (12)
- Jordan (10)
- Malaysia (10)
- Pakistan (11)
- Philippines (12)
- Saudi Arabia (4)
- Singapore (24)
- Thailand (21)
