= Bridge at the 2022 Asian Games =

- Venue: Hangzhou Chess Academy
- Dates: 27 September – 6 October 2023
- Competitors: 171 from 12 nations

Contract bridge at the 19th Asian Games was held at Hangzhou Chess Academy, also known as Hangzhou Qiyuan (Zhili) Chess Hall, Hangzhou, China between 27 September and 6 October 2023.

China finished first in the medal table by winning 3 medals.

== Schedule ==
Q	Qualification	S	Semifinals	F	Finals

Event↓/Date →	27th Wed	28th Thu	29th Fri	30th Sat	1st Sun	2nd Mon	3rd Tue	4th Wed	5th Thu	6th Fri
Men's team	Q	Q	Q	Q	Q	Q	S	S	F	F
Women's team	Q	Q	Q	Q	Q	Q	S	S	F	F
Mixed team	Q	Q	Q	Q	Q	Q	S	S	F	F

== Medalists ==
Event	Gold	Silver	Bronze
Men's team	Hong Kong; Chiu Wai Lap; Ho Hoi Tung; Ho Wai Lam; Lai Wai Kit; Mak Kwok Fai; Sze Shun Sum	India; Ajay Khare; Sumit Mukherjee; Jaggy Shivdasani; Sandeep Thakral; Rajeshwar Tiwari; Raju Tolani	Japan; Kazuo Furuta; Hiroaki Miura; Masayuki Tanaka; Hiroki Yokoi
Men's team	Hong Kong; Chiu Wai Lap; Ho Hoi Tung; Ho Wai Lam; Lai Wai Kit; Mak Kwok Fai; Sze Shun Sum	India; Ajay Khare; Sumit Mukherjee; Jaggy Shivdasani; Sandeep Thakral; Rajeshwar Tiwari; Raju Tolani	China; Hu Linlin; Ju Chuancheng; Liu Jing; Liu Yinghao; Zhuang Zejun
Women's team	China; Huang Yan; Liu Yan; Ran Jingrong; Yu Xiuting	Chinese Taipei; Chen Yin-shou; Hsiao Kuan-chu; Lin Yin-yu; Liu Lin-chin; Liu Pei-hua; Yang Ming-ching	Singapore; Leong Jia Min; Li Lan; Lim Jing Xuan; Low Siok Hui; Jazlene Ong; Selene Tan
Women's team	China; Huang Yan; Liu Yan; Ran Jingrong; Yu Xiuting	Chinese Taipei; Chen Yin-shou; Hsiao Kuan-chu; Lin Yin-yu; Liu Lin-chin; Liu Pei-hua; Yang Ming-ching	Hong Kong; Pearlie Chan; Charmian Koo; Tang Tsz In; Joyce Tung; Flora Wong; Yeung Hoi Ning
Mixed team	Chinese Taipei; Fan Kang-wei; Liu Ming-chien; Wu Tzu-lin; Chen Kuan-hsuan; So Ho-yee; Tsai Po-ya	China; Chen Yichao; Dai Jianming; Hu Junjie; Fu Bo; Wang Jian; Zhang Yu	Thailand; Panjaroon Jariyanuntanaet; Kirawat Limsinsopon; Kridsadayut Plengsap; Wanna Amornmeswarintara; Kanokporn Janebunjong; Pavinee Sitthicharoensawat
Mixed team	Chinese Taipei; Fan Kang-wei; Liu Ming-chien; Wu Tzu-lin; Chen Kuan-hsuan; So Ho-yee; Tsai Po-ya	China; Chen Yichao; Dai Jianming; Hu Junjie; Fu Bo; Wang Jian; Zhang Yu	Singapore; Loo Choon Chou; Luo Cheng; Gideon Tan; Lam Ze Ying; Seet Choon Cheng; Tan Sock Ngin

== Medal table ==
Rank	Nation	Gold	Silver	Bronze	Total
1	China (CHN)	1	1	1	3
2	Chinese Taipei (TPE)	1	1	0	2
3	Hong Kong (HKG)	1	0	1	2
4	India (IND)	0	1	0	1
5	Singapore (SGP)	0	0	2	2
6	Japan (JPN)	0	0	1	1
6	Thailand (THA)	0	0	1	1
Totals (7 entries)		3	3	6	12

== Participating nations ==
A total of 171 athletes from 12 nations competed in bridge at the 2022 Asian Games:

- Bangladesh (5)
- China (15)
- Chinese Taipei (18)
- Hong Kong (18)
- India (18)
- Indonesia (12)
- Japan (8)
- Pakistan (11)
- Philippines (12)
- Singapore (18)
- South Korea (18)
- Thailand (18)
