= Sandeep Thakral =

Indian bridge player

Personal information
- Nationality: Indian
- Born: 13 October 1973 (age 52)
- Height: 1.77 m (5 ft 10 in)
Medal record
Men's bridge
Representing India
Asian Games
Silver medal – second place	2022 Hangzhou	Team

Sandeep Thakral (born 13 October 1973) is an Indian bridge player. He was selected to the Indian bridge team to take part in the 2022 Asian Games at Hangzhou, China. In the final, team suffered a defeat to Hong Kong and were awarded the silver medal. In the semifinals, India defeated China. In 2018 Asian Games, the Indian team won a bronze medal.

Sandeep is a resident of Gurugram. He runs his own IT company. He began playing bridge in 1998 and won a bronze medal at the Commonwealth Championships in 2011. He won the gold at the BIFEM in 2021 and 2023.
