= Sumit Mukherjee =

Indian bridge player

Personal information
- Nationality: Indian
- Born: 18 November 1974 (age 51)
- Height: 1.68 m (5 ft 6 in)

Sport
- Sport: Bridge
Medal record
Bridge
Representing India
Asian Games
Silver medal – second place	2022 Hangzhou	Team
Bronze medal – third place	2018 Jakarta Palembang	Team

Sumit Mukherjee (born 18 November 1974) is an Indian bridge player from Birati, Kolkata, West Bengal. He has been a member on the Indian national team that competed in the 2018 Asian Games and the 2022 Asian Games. He received a bronze medal at the 2018 games. In 2023, Mukherjee won gold at the Bridge Federation of Asia and Middle-East Championships, earning him a place at the World Championships.

In addition to playing bridge, Mukherjee works for the Kolkata Metro.
