= Jaggy Shivdasani =

Indian bridge player

Personal information
- Nationality: Indian
- Born: 16 February 1958 (age 68)
- Height: 1.80 m (5 ft 11 in)
Medal record
Men's bridge
Representing India
Asian Games
Silver medal – second place	2022 Hangzhou	Team
Bronze medal – third place	2018 Jakarta Palembang	Team

Jaggy Shivdasani (born 16 February 1958) is one of India's most successful bridge players. Having burst onto India's national scene in 1976 by winning the premier Holkar Trophy, he went on to win all national titles, usually multiple times. He represented India in numerous international events, including the 1988 World Team Olympiad in Venice, where his team reached the semi-finals before losing to the United States (the eventual winner). Shivdasani is from Mumbai (also known as Bombay).

In July 1987, Shivdasani made history when he became the first foreigner ever to win one of the three major North American team events: the Spingold Knockout Teams. In autumn 1987 he won his second straight major title, the Reisinger Board-a-Match Teams, as part of a foursome that included players from four countries.

== Tournament record ==
=== Winner ===
- North American Bridge Championships (3)
  - North American Swiss Teams (1) 2002
  - Reisinger Board-a-Match Teams (1) 1987
  - Spingold Knockout Teams (1) 1987
- Asia & Middle East Championships (1)
  - Open Teams (1) 1997

=== Runners-up ===
- Asia & Middle East Championships (2)
  - Open Teams (2) 1985, 1989
