= Rajeshwar Tiwari =

Indian bridge player

Personal information
- Nationality: Indian
- Born: 9 April 1963 (age 63)
- Height: 1.79 m (5 ft 10 in)
Medal record
Men's bridge
Representing India
Asian Games
Silver medal – second place	2022 Hangzhou	Team
Bronze medal – third place	2018 Jakarta Palembang	Team

Rajeshwar Tiwari (born 9 April 1963) is an Indian bridge player. He competed at both the 2018 Asian Games and the 2022 Asian Games, winning bronze in the former and silver in the latter. Tiwari also played in for India at the 2023 Bridge Federation of Asia and Middle East Championships, where his team won gold.

Aside from playing bridge, Tiwari works as an IT professional.
