= Ajay Khare =

Indian bridge player

Personal information
- Full name: Ajay Prabhakar Khare
- Nationality: India
- Born: 2 July 1959 (age 66)
- Education: IIT Bombay
- Height: 1.67 m (5 ft 6 in)

Sport
- Sport: Bridge
Medal record
Bridge
Representing India
Asian Games
Silver medal – second place	2022 Hangzhou	Team
Bronze medal – third place	2018 Jakarta Palembang	Team

Ajay Prabhakar Khare (born 2 July 1959) is an Indian bridge player.

== Early life and education ==
After obtaining a degree in mechanical engineering from the Visvesvaraya Regional College of Engineering, Nagpur, he went on to complete his master's degree from IIT Bombay.

== Bridge career ==
In the 2018 Asian Games, he was part of the men's team that won bronze.

In the 2022 Asian Games, he was part of the bridge team. In the final, they suffered a defeat to Hong Kong and were awarded the silver medal.
