= Raju Tolani =

Indian bridge player

Personal information
- Nationality: Indian
- Born: 24 November 1960 (age 65)
- Education: IIT BHU
- Height: 1.67 m (5 ft 6 in)

Sport
- Sport: Bridge
Medal record
Men's bridge
Representing India
Asian Games
Silver medal – second place	2022 Hangzhou	Team
Bronze medal – third place	2018 Jakarta Palembang	Team

Raju Tolani (born 24 November 1960) is an Indian bridge player. He graduated from IIT BHU. He is the managing director of Schmolz + Bickenbach.

In the 2018 Asian Games, he was part of the men's team that won bronze.

In the 2022 Asian Games, he was part of the bridge team. In the final, they suffered a defeat to Hong Kong and were awarded the silver medal.
