= Bridge at the 2022 Asian Games – Mixed team =

Mixed team at the 2022 Asian Games
- Venue: Hangzhou Chess Academy
- Dates: 27 September – 6 October 2023
- Competitors: 64 from 11 nations

Medalists
| gold medal | Chinese Taipei; Fan Kang-wei, Liu Ming-chien, Wu Tzu-lin, Chen Kuan-hsuan, So Ho-yee, Tsai Po-ya |
| silver medal | China; Chen Yichao, Dai Jianming, Hu Junjie, Fu Bo, Wang Jian, Zhang Yu |
| bronze medal | Thailand; Panjaroon Jariyanuntanaet, Kirawat Limsinsopon, Kridsadayut Plengsap, Wanna Amornmeswarintara, Kanokporn Janebunjong, Pavinee Sitthicharoensawat |
| bronze medal | Singapore; Loo Choon Chou, Luo Cheng, Gideon Tan, Lam Ze Ying, Seet Choon Cheng, Tan Sock Ngin |

The contract bridge mixed team competition at the 2022 Asian Games was held at Hangzhou Chess Academy, Hangzhou, China from 27 September to 6 October 2023.

== Schedule ==
All times are China Standard Time (UTC+08:00)

| Date | Time | Event |
|---|---|---|
| Wednesday, 27 September 2023 | 09:00 | Round robin 1–1 |
| Wednesday, 27 September 2023 | 13:30 | Round robin 1–2 |
| Wednesday, 27 September 2023 | 16:00 | Round robin 1–3 |
| Wednesday, 27 September 2023 | 18:30 | Round robin 1–4 |
| Thursday, 28 September 2023 | 09:00 | Round robin 1–5 |
| Thursday, 28 September 2023 | 13:30 | Round robin 1–6 |
| Thursday, 28 September 2023 | 16:00 | Round robin 1–7 |
| Thursday, 28 September 2023 | 18:30 | Round robin 1–8 |
| Friday, 29 September 2023 | 09:00 | Round robin 1–9 |
| Friday, 29 September 2023 | 13:30 | Round robin 1–10 |
| Friday, 29 September 2023 | 16:00 | Round robin 1–11 |
| Saturday, 30 September 2023 | 09:00 | Round robin 2–1 |
| Saturday, 30 September 2023 | 13:30 | Round robin 2–2 |
| Saturday, 30 September 2023 | 16:00 | Round robin 2–3 |
| Saturday, 30 September 2023 | 18:30 | Round robin 2–4 |
| Sunday, 1 October 2023 | 09:00 | Round robin 2–5 |
| Sunday, 1 October 2023 | 13:30 | Round robin 2–6 |
| Sunday, 1 October 2023 | 16:00 | Round robin 2–7 |
| Sunday, 1 October 2023 | 18:30 | Round robin 2–8 |
| Monday, 2 October 2023 | 09:00 | Round robin 2–9 |
| Monday, 2 October 2023 | 13:30 | Round robin 2–10 |
| Monday, 2 October 2023 | 16:00 | Round robin 2–11 |
| Tuesday, 3 October 2023 | 09:00 | Semifinals 1 |
| Wednesday, 4 October 2023 | 09:00 | Semifinals 2 |
| Thursday, 5 October 2023 | 09:00 | Final 1 |
| Friday, 6 October 2023 | 09:00 | Final 2 |

== Squads ==
| China | Chinese Taipei | Hong Kong | India |
|---|---|---|---|
| Chen Yichao; Dai Jianming; Hu Junjie; Fu Bo; Wang Jian; Zhang Yu | Fan Kang-wei; Liu Ming-chien; Wu Tzu-lin; Chen Kuan-hsuan; So Ho-yee; Tsai Po-ya | David Ip; Tseng Tsz Chuen; Wong Kon; Chan Suk King; Lu Yiyang; Man Pui Yi | Sandeep Karmarkar; Rajeev Khandelwal; Bachiraju Satyanarayana; Marianne Karmarkar; Himani Khandelwal; Kiran Nadar |
| Indonesia | Japan | Pakistan | Philippines |
| Taufik Gautama Asbi; Julius Anthonius George; Robert Parasian; Rury Andhani; Lusje Olha Bojoh; Conny Eufke Sumampouw | Tadashi Imakura; Tadashi Teramoto; Makiko Sato; Akiko Yanagisawa | Anwar Mumtaz Kizilbash; Farrukh Liaqat; Arslan Mansoor; Rubina Agha; Samira Jimmy Fancy; Azra Raja | Francisco Alquiros; Felipe Manalang; Romulo Virola; Cristy Ann de Guzman; Suena Manalang; Gemma Mariano |
| Singapore | South Korea | Thailand | |
| Loo Choon Chou; Luo Cheng; Gideon Tan; Lam Ze Ying; Seet Choon Cheng; Tan Sock Ngin | Hwang In-gu; Kang Song-seok; Roh Seung-jin; Kim Hye-young; Lee Soo-hyun; Oh Hye-min | Panjaroon Jariyanuntanaet; Kirawat Limsinsopon; Kridsadayut Plengsap; Wanna Amornmeswarintara; Kanokporn Janebunjong; Pavinee Sitthicharoensawat | |

== Results ==
=== Qualification ===
| Rank | Team | Round | | | | | | | | | | | Pen. | Total |
| Rank | Team | 1 | 2 | 3 | 4 | 5 | 6 | 7 | 8 | 9 | 10 | 11 | Pen. | Total |
|---|---|---|---|---|---|---|---|---|---|---|---|---|---|---|
| 1 | Chinese Taipei (TPE) | JPN; 19.38 | CHN; 5.81 | PAK; 19.74 | THA; 5.15 | SGP; 15.46 | IND; 10.00 | Bye; 12.00 | HKG; 14.19 | KOR; 19.74 | PHI; 4.15 | INA; 18.17 | 1.84 | 296.24 |
| 1 | Chinese Taipei (TPE) | Bye; 12.00 | PAK; 19.18 | KOR; 13.96 | PHI; 19.08 | INA; 17.19 | JPN; 9.67 | IND; 15.66 | SGP; 5.81 | CHN; 6.77 | HKG; 17.34 | THA; 17.63 | 1.84 | 296.24 |
| 2 | China (CHN) | INA; 11.28 | TPE; 14.19 | Bye; 12.00 | HKG; 3.12 | KOR; 19.83 | PHI; 16.03 | PAK; 11.58 | IND; 3.45 | THA; 18.65 | SGP; 2.23 | JPN; 17.63 | 0.66 | 280.57 |
| 2 | China (CHN) | PHI; 13.23 | INA; 14.64 | JPN; 13.48 | Bye; 12.00 | PAK; 20.00 | KOR; 12.44 | SGP; 5.81 | THA; 16.21 | TPE; 13.23 | IND; 13.48 | HKG; 16.72 | 0.66 | 280.57 |
| 3 | Singapore (SGP) | HKG; 15.66 | KOR; 2.23 | PHI; 17.91 | INA; 17.49 | TPE; 4.54 | Bye; 12.00 | THA; 2.37 | PAK; 20.00 | JPN; 13.48 | CHN; 17.77 | IND; 5.36 | | 266.06 |
| 3 | Singapore (SGP) | INA; 7.84 | JPN; 2.81 | Bye; 12.00 | PAK; 9.67 | KOR; 12.97 | PHI; 13.23 | CHN; 14.19 | TPE; 14.19 | HKG; 16.55 | THA; 17.77 | IND; 16.03 | | 266.06 |
| 4 | Thailand (THA) | KOR; 16.72 | PHI; 16.03 | INA; 11.87 | TPE; 14.85 | Bye; 12.00 | HKG; 14.42 | SGP; 17.63 | JPN; 19.47 | CHN; 1.35 | IND; 3.28 | PAK; 9.03 | | 252.69 |
| 4 | Thailand (THA) | PAK; 18.04 | KOR; 20.00 | PHI; 13.23 | INA; 16.38 | JPN; 14.19 | Bye; 12.00 | HKG; 11.58 | CHN; 3.79 | IND; 2.23 | SGP; 2.23 | TPE; 2.37 | | 252.69 |
| 5 | India (IND) | Bye; 12.00 | HKG; 3.28 | KOR; 17.19 | PHI; 7.56 | INA; 14.85 | TPE; 10.00 | JPN; 5.36 | CHN; 16.55 | PAK; 10.66 | THA; 16.72 | SGP; 14.64 | | 233.28 |
| 5 | India (IND) | JPN; 3.97 | Bye; 12.00 | PAK; 14.19 | KOR; 18.53 | PHI; 15.06 | INA; 4.15 | TPE; 4.34 | HKG; 3.97 | THA; 17.77 | CHN; 6.52 | SGP; 3.97 | | 233.28 |
| 6 | Japan (JPN) | TPE; 0.62 | Bye; 12.00 | HKG; 8.72 | KOR; 12.16 | PHI; 14.85 | INA; 7.56 | IND; 14.64 | THA; 0.53 | SGP; 6.52 | PAK; 20.00 | CHN; 2.37 | | 224.24 |
| 6 | Japan (JPN) | IND; 16.03 | SGP; 17.19 | CHN; 6.52 | HKG; 13.96 | THA; 5.81 | TPE; 10.33 | Bye; 12.00 | PAK; 10.00 | KOR; 10.00 | PHI; 17.49 | INA; 4.94 | | 224.24 |
| 7 | Indonesia (INA) | CHN; 8.72 | PAK; 6.28 | THA; 8.13 | SGP; 2.51 | IND; 5.15 | JPN; 12.44 | PHI; 20.00 | KOR; 6.28 | Bye; 12.00 | HKG; 8.72 | TPE; 1.83 | | 213.51 |
| 7 | Indonesia (INA) | SGP; 12.16 | CHN; 5.36 | HKG; 7.03 | THA; 3.62 | TPE; 2.81 | IND; 15.85 | PHI; 13.96 | KOR; 14.42 | Bye; 12.00 | PAK; 19.18 | JPN; 15.06 | | 213.51 |
| 8 | Hong Kong (HKG) | SGP; 4.34 | IND; 16.72 | JPN; 11.28 | CHN; 16.88 | PAK; 18.29 | THA; 5.58 | KOR; 18.04 | TPE; 5.81 | PHI; 11.58 | INA; 11.28 | Bye; 12.00 | 1.00 | 208.58 |
| 8 | Hong Kong (HKG) | KOR; 3.28 | PHI; 2.09 | INA; 12.97 | JPN; 6.04 | Bye; 12.00 | PAK; 7.56 | THA; 8.42 | IND; 16.03 | SGP; 3.45 | TPE; 2.66 | CHN; 3.28 | 1.00 | 208.58 |
| 9 | Philippines (PHI) | PAK; 10.33 | THA; 3.97 | SGP; 2.09 | IND; 12.44 | JPN; 5.15 | CHN; 3.97 | INA; 0.00 | Bye; 12.00 | HKG; 8.42 | TPE; 15.85 | KOR; 13.23 | | 173.21 |
| 9 | Philippines (PHI) | CHN; 6.77 | HKG; 17.91 | THA; 6.77 | TPE; 0.92 | IND; 4.94 | SGP; 6.77 | INA; 6.04 | Bye; 12.00 | PAK; 8.42 | JPN; 2.51 | KOR; 12.71 | | 173.21 |
| 10 | South Korea (KOR) | THA; 3.28 | SGP; 17.77 | IND; 2.81 | JPN; 7.84 | CHN; 0.17 | PAK; 10.97 | HKG; 1.96 | INA; 13.72 | TPE; 0.26 | Bye; 12.00 | PHI; 6.77 | 0.50 | 160.41 |
| 10 | South Korea (KOR) | HKG; 16.72 | THA; 0.00 | TPE; 6.04 | IND; 1.47 | SGP; 7.03 | CHN; 7.56 | PAK; 9.67 | INA; 5.58 | JPN; 10.00 | Bye; 12.00 | PHI; 7.29 | 0.50 | 160.41 |
| 11 | Pakistan (PAK) | PHI; 9.67 | INA; 13.72 | TPE; 0.26 | Bye; 12.00 | HKG; 1.71 | KOR; 9.03 | CHN; 8.42 | SGP; 0.00 | IND; 9.34 | JPN; 0.00 | THA; 10.97 | | 151.21 |
| 11 | Pakistan (PAK) | THA; 1.96 | TPE; 0.82 | IND; 5.81 | SGP; 10.33 | CHN; 0.00 | HKG; 12.44 | KOR; 10.33 | JPN; 10.00 | PHI; 11.58 | INA; 0.82 | Bye; 12.00 | | 151.21 |

=== Knockout round ===
| Semifinals | | | Final |
| 1 | Chinese Taipei | 248.10 |
| 4 | Thailand | 168.00 | 1 | Chinese Taipei | 196.00 |
| 2 | China | 231.00 | 2 | China | 185.77 |
| 3 | Singapore | 225.77 |

==== Semifinals ====
| Team | Carry over | Segment | | | | | | Pen. | Total |
| Team | Carry over | 1 | 2 | 3 | 4 | 5 | 6 | Pen. | Total |
|---|---|---|---|---|---|---|---|---|---|
| Chinese Taipei (TPE) | 8.10 | 38 | 50 | 20 | 45 | 26 | 67 | 6.00 | 248.10 |
| Thailand (THA) | 0.00 | 45 | 42 | 3 | 3 | 43 | 35 | 3.00 | 168.00 |
| China (CHN) | 0.00 | 45 | 46 | 45 | 40 | 7 | 48 | | 231.00 |
| Singapore (SGP) | 16.77 | 39 | 2 | 49 | 32 | 49 | 38 | | 225.77 |

==== Final ====
| Team | Carry over | Segment | | | | | | Pen. | Total |
| Team | Carry over | 1 | 2 | 3 | 4 | 5 | 6 | Pen. | Total |
|---|---|---|---|---|---|---|---|---|---|
| Chinese Taipei (TPE) | 0.00 | 38 | 52 | 15 | 30 | 38 | 23 | | 196.00 |
| China (CHN) | 8.77 | 34 | 17 | 43 | 39 | 17 | 27 | | 185.77 |
