= Bridge at the 2018 Asian Games – Mixed team =

Mixed team at the 2018 Asian Games
- Venue: Jakarta International Expo
- Dates: 21–27 August 2018
- Competitors: 46 from 8 nations

Medalists
gold medal	China; Li Liang, Xun Yonghong, Zhang Yizhuo, Hu Wen, Yang Jinghui, Zhu Aiping
silver medal	Thailand; Somchai Baisamut, Terasak Jitngamkusol, Kridsadayut Plengsap, Taristchollatorn Chodchoy, Kanokporn Janebunjong, Chodchoy Sophonpanich
bronze medal	India; Rajeev Khandelwal, Gopinath Manna, Bachiraju Satyanarayana, Hema Deora, Himani Khandelwal, Kiran Nadar
bronze medal	Indonesia; Taufik Gautama Asbi, Bill Mondigir, Robert Parasian, Lusje Olha Bojoh, Elvita Lasut, Julita Grace Joice Tueje

The contract bridge mixed team competition at the 2018 Asian Games was held at the Jakarta International Expo, Jakarta, Indonesia from 21 to 27 August 2018.

== Schedule ==
All times are Western Indonesia Time (UTC+07:00)

Date	Time	Event
Tuesday, 21 August 2018	10:00	Round robin 1–1
Tuesday, 21 August 2018	14:00	Round robin 1–2
Tuesday, 21 August 2018	16:45	Round robin 1–3
Wednesday, 22 August 2018	10:00	Round robin 1–4
Wednesday, 22 August 2018	14:00	Round robin 1–5
Wednesday, 22 August 2018	16:45	Round robin 1–6
Thursday, 23 August 2018	10:00	Round robin 1–7
Thursday, 23 August 2018	14:00	Round robin 2–1
Thursday, 23 August 2018	16:45	Round robin 2–2
Friday, 24 August 2018	09:30	Round robin 2–3
Friday, 24 August 2018	14:00	Round robin 2–4
Friday, 24 August 2018	16:45	Round robin 2–5
Saturday, 25 August 2018	10:00	Round robin 2–6
Saturday, 25 August 2018	14:00	Round robin 2–7
Sunday, 26 August 2018	09:30	Semifinals
Monday, 27 August 2018	10:00	Final

== Squads ==
China	Chinese Taipei	India	Indonesia
Li Liang; Xun Yonghong; Zhang Yizhuo; Hu Wen; Yang Jinghui; Zhu Aiping	Fan Kang-wei; Hsiao Tzu-liang; Yang Hsin-lung; Lu Yi-zu; Tsai Po-ya; Wang Jui	Rajeev Khandelwal; Gopinath Manna; Bachiraju Satyanarayana; Hema Deora; Himani Khandelwal; Kiran Nadar	Taufik Gautama Asbi; Bill Mondigir; Robert Parasian; Lusje Olha Bojoh; Elvita Lasut; Julita Grace Joice Tueje
Japan	Jordan	Singapore	Thailand
Toshihiro Katsube; Takumi Seshimo; Tetsuya Ueda; Masako Katsube; Tomoe Nakao; Mariko Ueda	Samer Al-Rawashdeh; Marwan Ghanem; Sireen Barakat; Farah Tambulat	Kenneth Chan; Lam Cheng Yen; Kelvin Ng; Lam Ze Ying; Lim Jing Xuan; Low Siok Hui	Somchai Baisamut; Terasak Jitngamkusol; Kridsadayut Plengsap; Taristchollatorn Chodchoy; Kanokporn Janebunjong; Chodchoy Sophonpanich

== Results ==
=== Qualification round ===
Rank	Team	Round							Pen.	Total
Rank	Team	1	2	3	4	5	6	7	Pen.	Total
1	India (IND)	TPE; 6.96	CHN; 10.91	THA; 14.80	JPN; 10.00	SGP; 11.20	JOR; 14.80	INA; 17.72	0.50	172.56
1	India (IND)	SGP; 16.88	THA; 11.20	TPE; 18.97	JOR; 18.33	INA; 2.15	CHN; 3.58	JPN; 15.56	0.50	172.56
2	Indonesia (INA)	JPN; 5.20	TPE; 7.45	CHN; 12.03	THA; 13.52	JOR; 12.80	SGP; 14.80	IND; 2.28		169.90
2	Indonesia (INA)	JOR; 16.26	SGP; 16.26	THA; 13.75	TPE; 14.80	IND; 17.85	JPN; 16.42	CHN; 6.48		169.90
3	China (CHN)	SGP; 13.04	IND; 9.09	INA; 7.97	JOR; 6.48	TPE; 14.80	JPN; 12.80	THA; 12.80	0.75	164.14
3	China (CHN)	TPE; 14.18	JOR; 7.97	SGP; 5.82	THA; 12.03	JPN; 17.97	IND; 16.42	INA; 13.52	0.75	164.14
4	Thailand (THA)	JOR; 9.09	SGP; 11.76	IND; 5.20	INA; 6.48	JPN; 6.25	TPE; 16.88	CHN; 7.20	0.50	142.08
4	Thailand (THA)	JPN; 11.76	IND; 8.80	INA; 6.25	CHN; 7.97	TPE; 18.66	JOR; 14.80	SGP; 11.48	0.50	142.08
5	Japan (JPN)	INA; 14.80	JOR; 12.29	SGP; 13.52	IND; 10.00	THA; 13.75	CHN; 7.20	TPE; 10.91	1.00	136.44
5	Japan (JPN)	THA; 8.24	TPE; 9.39	JOR; 11.20	SGP; 16.09	CHN; 2.03	INA; 3.58	IND; 4.44	1.00	136.44
6	Singapore (SGP)	CHN; 6.96	THA; 8.24	JPN; 6.48	TPE; 2.69	IND; 8.80	INA; 5.20	JOR; 12.55	0.75	117.70
6	Singapore (SGP)	IND; 3.12	INA; 3.74	CHN; 14.18	JPN; 3.91	JOR; 17.97	TPE; 16.09	THA; 8.52	0.75	117.70
7	Chinese Taipei (TPE)	IND; 13.04	INA; 12.55	JOR; 5.61	SGP; 17.31	CHN; 5.20	THA; 3.12	JPN; 9.09		110.09
7	Chinese Taipei (TPE)	CHN; 5.82	JPN; 10.61	IND; 1.03	INA; 5.20	THA; 1.34	SGP; 3.91	JOR; 16.26		110.09
8	Jordan (JOR)	THA; 10.91	JPN; 7.71	TPE; 14.39	CHN; 13.52	INA; 7.20	IND; 5.20	SGP; 7.45	2.00	101.59
8	Jordan (JOR)	INA; 3.74	CHN; 12.03	JPN; 8.80	IND; 1.67	SGP; 2.03	THA; 5.20	TPE; 3.74	2.00	101.59

=== Knockout round ===
Semifinals			Final
1	India	109.67
4	Thailand	113.00	4	Thailand	70.00
2	Indonesia	87.00	3	China	122.67
3	China	121.00

==== Semifinals ====
Team	Carry over	Segment			Pen.	Total
Team	Carry over	1	2	3	Pen.	Total
India (IND)	7.67	62	19	21		109.67
Thailand (THA)	0.00	35	46	32		113.00
Indonesia (INA)	0.00	21	23	43		87.00
China (CHN)	2.00	43	48	28		121.00

==== Final ====
Team	Carry over	Segment			Pen.	Total
Team	Carry over	1	2	3	Pen.	Total
Thailand (THA)	0.00	6	32	32		70.00
China (CHN)	5.67	41	34	42		122.67
