= Singapore at the 2018 Asian Games =

- IOC code: SGP
- NOC: Singapore National Olympic Council
- Website: www.singaporeolympics.com (in English)

in Jakarta and Palembang August 18 – September 2
- Competitors: 265 in 21 sports
- Flag bearer: Hoe Wah Toon
- Medals Ranked 18th: Gold 4 Silver 4 Bronze 14 Total 22

Asian Games appearances (overview)
- 1951; 1954; 1958; 1962; 1966; 1970; 1974; 1978; 1982; 1986; 1990; 1994; 1998; 2002; 2006; 2010; 2014; 2018; 2022; 2026

Singapore participated in the 2018 Asian Games in Jakarta and Palembang, Indonesia from 18 August to 2 September 2018. It was Singapore's 18th appearance at the Asian Games, having competed at every Games since 1951, and claimed 8 gold, 7 silver, and 12 bronze medals at the 2006 Doha, as their best achievement this far. At the last edition of 2014 Asian Games in Incheon, South Korea, the country won five gold, 6 silver, and 13 bronze medals.

Singapore sent 265 athletes across 21 sports to compete in Jakarta and Palembang. Former Singaporean shooter Lee Wung Yew assigned as chef de mission for the contingent. At the opening ceremony parade, gymnast Hoe Wah Toon was unveiled as the flag bearer. The country made its debut in four sports, include contract bridge, artistic swimming, ju-jitsu and paragliding.

== Media coverage ==
Singaporean public broadcasting conglomerate Mediacorp held the broadcast rights of the 2018 Asian Games in the country. It broadcast the games through seven live channels on digital video on demand service Toggle (now meWATCH) including oktoSports.

== Medalists ==
The following Singapore competitors won medals at the Games.

Medal	Name	Sport	Event	Date
Gold	Joseph Schooling	Swimming	Men's 100 metre butterfly	22 Aug
Gold	Joseph Schooling	Swimming	Men's 50 metre butterfly	23 Aug
Gold	Min Kimberly Lim; Rui Qi Cecilia Low	Sailing	Women's 49er FX	29 Aug
Gold	Poon Hua; Loo Choon Chou; Zhang Yukun; Fong Kien Hoong; Desmond Oh; Kelvin Ong	Contract bridge	Men's team	27 Aug
Silver	Roanne Ho	Swimming	Women's 50 metre breaststroke	23 Aug
Silver	Constance Lien	Ju-jitsu	Women's 62 kg	25 Aug
Silver	Nurzuhairah Mohammad Yazid	Pencak silat	Women's tunggal	27 Aug
Silver	Sheik Ferdous Alau'ddin	Pencak silat	Men's tanding 90 kg	27 Aug
Bronze	Quah Zheng Wen; Joseph Schooling; Danny Yeo; Jonathan Tan; Darren Chua; Glen Lim	Swimming	Men's 4 × 200 metre freestyle relay	20 Aug
Bronze	Bernice Lim Hui Ying; Daphne Tan Shi Jing; Joey Yeo Ruoqi	Bowling	Women's trios	22 Aug
Bronze	Quah Zheng Wen; Joseph Schooling; Darren Chua; Darren Lim; Danny Yeo; Jonathan Tan	Swimming	Men's 4 × 100 metre freestyle relay	22 Aug
Bronze	Amita Berthier; Melanie Huang; Maxine Wong; Tatiana Wong	Fencing	Women's team foil	23 Aug
Bronze	Alex Chong Wei Chien; Muhammad Jaris Goh; Darren Ong Wei Siong	Bowling	Men's trios	23 Aug
Bronze	Hoong En Qi; Samantha Yeo; Quah Jing Wen; Quah Ting Wen; Cherlyn Yeoh	Swimming	Women's 4 × 100 metre medley relay	23 Aug
Bronze	Nurul Shafiqah Saiful	Pencak silat	Women's tanding 55 kg	26 Aug
Bronze	Sheik Farhan Alau'ddin	Pencak silat	Men's tanding 95 kg	26 Aug
Bronze	Siti Khadijah Shahrem	Pencak silat	Women's tanding 60 kg	26 Aug
Bronze	Mohamad Farhan Arman; Muhammad Asri Bin Aron; Muhammad A'fif Bin Safiee; Asfandi Bin Jaal; Muhammad Farhan Bin Aman	Sepak takraw	Men's regu	27 Aug
Bronze	Ryan Lo	Sailing	Men's Laser	31 Aug
Bronze	Mervyn Toh	Canoeing	Men's K-1 200 metres	1 Sep
Bronze	Mohd Al-Haj Kasmanani; Muhammad A'fif Bin Safiee; Mohamad Farhan Arman; Khairilshamy Shamsudin; Muhammad Asri Bin Aron; Muhammad Farhan Bin Aman	Sepak takraw	Men's quadrant	1 Sep
Bronze	Yu Mengyu	Table tennis	Women's singles	1 Sep

Medals by sport
Sport	1st place, gold medalist(s)	2nd place, silver medalist(s)	3rd place, bronze medalist(s)	Total
Bowling	0	0	2	2
Canoeing	0	0	1	1
Contract bridge	1	0	0	1
Fencing	0	0	1	1
Ju-jitsu	0	1	0	1
Pencak silat	0	2	3	5
Sailing	1	0	1	2
Sepak takraw	0	0	2	2
Swimming	2	1	3	6
Table Tennis	0	0	1	1
Total	4	4	14	22

Medals by day
Day	Date	1st place, gold medalist(s)	2nd place, silver medalist(s)	3rd place, bronze medalist(s)	Total
1	August 19	0	0	0	0
2	August 20	0	0	1	1
3	August 21	0	0	0	0
4	August 22	1	0	2	3
5	August 23	1	1	3	5
6	August 24	0	0	0	0
7	August 25	0	1	0	1
8	August 26	0	0	3	3
9	August 27	1	2	1	4
10	August 28	0	0	0	0
11	August 29	1	0	0	1
12	August 30	0	0	0	0
13	August 31	0	0	1	1
14	September 1	0	0	3	3
15	September 2	0	0	0	0
Total		4	4	14	22

== Competitors ==
The following is a list of the number of competitors representing Singapore that participated at the Games:

Sport	Men	Women	Total
Archery	5	4	9
Artistic swimming	—	8	8
Athletics	1	7	8
Bowling	6	6	12
Canoeing	19	22	41
Contract bridge	12	12	24
Cycling	1	2	3
Diving	4	4	8
Equestrian	0	2	2
Fencing	4	9	13
Golf	4	0	4
Gymnastics	2	2	4
Jujutsu	5	2	7
Paragliding	0	1	1
Pencak silat	9	8	17
Rowing	0	1	1
Rugby sevens	0	12	12
Sailing	7	8	15
Sepak takraw	7	0	7
Shooting	4	5	9
Sports climbing	3	4	7
Squash	4	0	4
Swimming	14	11	25
Table tennis	1	5	6
Water polo	13	0	13
Wushu	3	2	5
Total	128	137	265

Demonstration events

Sport	Men	Women	Total
Canoe polo	6	6	12

== Archery ==
National Sports Associations (NSA) has nominate 9 archers (5 men's and 4 women's) that will compete at the Games. The Singapore National Olympic Council (SNOC) will decide athletes who will compete.

Recurve

Athlete	Event	Ranking round		Round of 64	Round of 32	Round of 16	Quarterfinals	Semifinals	Final / BM	
Athlete	Event	Score	Seed	Opposition Score	Opposition Score	Opposition Score	Opposition Score	Opposition Score	Opposition Score	Rank
Tan Si Lie	Men's individual	625	31	Ri (PRK); W 7–3	Kim (KOR); L 1–7	Did not advance				

Compound

Athlete	Event	Ranking round		Round of 32	Round of 16	Quarterfinals	Semifinals	Final / BM	
Athlete	Event	Score	Seed	Opposition Score	Opposition Score	Opposition Score	Opposition Score	Opposition Score	Rank
Alan Lee; Ang Han Teng; Pang Toh Jin; Goh Jun Hui	Men's team	2027	14	—	Chinese Taipei; L 224–230	Did not advance			
Christina Gunawan; Contessa Loh; Madeleine Ong Xue Li; Angelica Lee Jia Hui	Women's team	1967	12	—	Kazakhstan; L 212–225	Did not advance			
Alan Lee; Contessa Loh	Mixed team	1363	13	Bye	Malaysia; W 153–152	Philippines; W 149–147	South Korea; L 152–156	Iran; L 152–155	4

== Artistic swimming ==
SNOC were included 8 women's to participate at the Games.

Athlete	Event	Technical routine		Free routine		Total	Rank
Athlete	Event	Points	Rank	Points	Rank	Total	Rank
Debbie Soh; Rachel Thean	Duet	73.5593	7	76.4000	7	149.9593	7
Hannah Chiang; Ariel Sng; Posh Soh; Teo Mou Wen; Lee Yi Jie; Debbie Soh; Vivien Tai; Rachel Thean	Team	73.0044	7	74.8667	7	147.8711	7

== Athletics ==
NSA has nominate 8 athletes (one men and 7 women's) that will compete at the Games. The SNOC will decide athletes who will compete.

Men
Track & road events

Athlete	Event	Heat		Semifinal		Final	
Athlete	Event	Result	Rank	Result	Rank	Result	Rank
Zubin Muncherji	400 m						

Women
Track & road events

Athlete	Event	Heat		Semifinal		Final	
Athlete	Event	Result	Rank	Result	Rank	Result	Rank
Veronica Shanti Pereira	100 m						
Veronica Shanti Pereira	200 m						
Dipna Lim Prasad	400 m						
Dipna Lim Prasad	400 m hurdles						
Veronica Shanti Pereira; Dipna Lim Prasad; Nur Izlyn Binte Zaini; Wendy Enn; Smriti Mahesh Menon; Elizabeth-Ann Tan Shee Ru	4 × 100 m relay						

Field events

Athlete	Event	Qualification		Final	
Athlete	Event	Distance	Position	Distance	Position
Michelle Sng Suat Li	High jump				

== Bowling ==
Singapore Bowling announced the 12-strong squad (6 men's and 6 women's) on 3 July 2018.

Men

Athlete	Event	Block 1	Block 2	Total	Rank	Stepladder final 1	Stepladder final 2	Rank
Athlete	Event	Result	Result	Total	Rank	Opposition Result	Opposition Result	Rank
Muhammad Jaris Goh	Masters	1900	1971	3871	6	Did not advance		
Darren Ong	Masters	1794	1827	3621	13	Did not advance		
Alex Chong; Darren Ong; Muhammad Jaris Goh	Trios	2135	2091	4226	3rd place, bronze medalist(s)	—		
Basil Ng; Cheah Ray Han; Jonovan Neo	Trios	1953	1816	3769	26	—		
Alex Chong; Darren Ong; Muhammad Jaris Goh; Basil Ng; Cheah Ray Han; Jonovan Neo	Team of six	3995	3908	7903	11	—		

Women

Athlete	Event	Block 1	Block 2	Total	Rank	Stepladder final 1	Stepladder final 2	Rank
Athlete	Event	Result	Result	Total	Rank	Opposition Result	Opposition Result	Rank
Daphne Tan	Masters	1939	1869	3808	5	Did not advance		
Joey Yeo Ruoqi	Masters	1941	1896	3837	4	Did not advance		
Joey Yeo Ruoqi; Daphne Tan; Bernice Lim	Trios	1993	2257	4250	3rd place, bronze medalist(s)	—		
Cherie Tan; Shayna Ng; Jazreel Tan	Trios	1940	1996	3936	9	—		
Joey Yeo Ruoqi; Daphne Tan; Bernice Lim; Cherie Tan; Shayna Ng; Jazreel Tan	Team of six	3786	3888	7674	7	—		

== Canoeing ==
=== Sprint ===
Athlete	Event	Heats		Semifinal		Final	
Athlete	Event	Time	Rank	Time	Rank	Time	Rank
Mervyn Toh	Men's K-1 200 m	37.599	1 QF	Bye		36.314	3rd place, bronze medalist(s)
Lucas Teo; Brandon Ooi	Men's K-2 1000 m	3:35.287	2 QF	Bye		3:31.123	4
Lim Yuan Yin	Women's C-1 200 m	55.571	4 QS	51.593	2 QF	52.745	8
Stephenie Chen	Women's K-1 200 m	43.791	4 QS	41.513	1 QF	43.162	4
Deborah Saw	Women's K-1 500 m	—				2:13.248	7
Sarah Chen; Geraldine Lee	Women's K-2 500 m	—				1:54.609	6
Soh Sze Ying; Geraldine Lee; Sarah Chen; Stephenie Chen	Women's K-4 500 m	—				1:40.819	5

Qualification legend: QF=Final; QS=Semifinal

=== Traditional boat race ===
Men

Athlete	Event	Heats		Repechage		Semifinals		Final	
Athlete	Event	Time	Rank	Time	Rank	Time	Rank	Time	Rank
Terence Ong; Jarett Tan; Jermaine Ko; Toh Wei Jie; Belvin Tan; Jerry Tan; Shawn Tan; Ang Shaun Jun; Barath Kumar; Lu Wenda; Ling Hsih Hwa; Lim Wee Siang; Kong Peng Hui; Kiang Jian Xiang; Chong Xue Ian; Chng Khai Hung	TBR 200 m	56.718	6 R	55.700	4 SF	55.928	5 TR	55.559	10
Terence Ong; Jarett Tan; Jermaine Ko; Toh Wei Jie; Belvin Tan; Jerry Tan; Shawn Tan; Ang Shaun Jun; Barath Kumar; Lu Wenda; Ling Hsih Hwa; Lim Wee Siang; Kong Peng Hui; Kiang Jian Xiang; Chong Xue Ian; Chng Khai Hung	TBR 500 m	2:20.658	4 R	2:23.366	3 SF	2:36.462	5 TR	2:22.873	9
Terence Ong; Jarett Tan; Jermaine Ko; Toh Wei Jie; Belvin Tan; Jerry Tan; Shawn Tan; Ang Shaun Jun; Barath Kumar; Lu Wenda; Ling Hsih Hwa; Lim Wee Siang; Kong Peng Hui; Kiang Jian Xiang; Chong Xue Ian; Chng Khai Hung	TBR 1000 m	5:17.128	5 R	4:52.652	3 SF	4:51.557	5 TR	4:55.149	8

Women

Athlete	Event	Heats		Repechage		Semifinals		Final	
Athlete	Event	Time	Rank	Time	Rank	Time	Rank	Time	Rank
Sherdyn Teng; Vanessa Tan; Denise Lindsey Ng; Eunice Thiam; Loh Peixuan; Diana Nai; Ng Ji Yan; Lew Si Hsien; Shanice Ng; Janice Yoong; Clara Siew; Wong Siong Yee; Chua Jia Min; Carmen Pang; Joyce Wee; Lim Xiaowei	TBR 200 m	59.004	4 R	58.676	1 SF	59.035	4 TR	59.102	7
Sherdyn Teng; Vanessa Tan; Denise Lindsey Ng; Eunice Thiam; Loh Peixuan; Diana Nai; Ng Ji Yan; Lew Si Hsien; Shanice Ng; Janice Yoong; Clara Siew; Wong Siong Yee; Chua Jia Min; Carmen Pang; Joyce Wee; Lim Xiaowei	TBR 500 m	2:34.864	4 R	2:34.882	2 SF	2:31.084	3 GF	2:32.026	6

=== Canoe polo (demonstration) ===
Singapore Canoe Federation entered their 12 athletes ( 6 men's and women's) at the demonstration sport canoe polo event.

Athlete	Event	1st round (qualification)		2nd round (loser pool)		Semifinal	Final / BM	
Athlete	Event	Opposition score	Rank	Opposition score	Rank	Opposition score	Opposition score	Rank
Yang Yuan Feng; Poh Yu Xuan; Poh Tai Cong; Ong Han Loong; Shawn Ng; Loi Heng Foo	Men's tournament	Indonesia (INA): W 16–0; Iran (IRI): L 2–4; Malaysia (MAS): W 4–3	3	Hong Kong (HKG): W 23–0; Indonesia (INA): W 20–1; Thailand (THA): W 13–2	5	Did not advance		
Gracie Chua; Leow Fang Hui; Kasxier Low; Chad Ong; Ong Shu Wen; Tan Li Ling	Women's tournament	Iran (IRI): W 3–2; Malaysia (MAS): W 17–1	1 Q	Bye		Japan (JPN); W 4–1	Iran (IRI); L 2–5	2nd place, silver medalist(s)

== Contract bridge ==
Men

Athlete	Event	Qualification		Semifinal		Final	
Athlete	Event	Point	Rank	Point	Rank	Point	Rank
Poon Hua; Loo Choon Chou	Pair	1721.9	3 Q	1086	9 Q	330	11
Fong Kien Hoong; Zhang Yukun	Pair	1478.9	14 Q	985.2	19	Did not advance	
Desmond Oh; Kelvin Ong	Pair	1378.4	29	Did not advance			
Poon Hua; Loo Choon Chou; Zhang Yukun; Fong Kien Hoong; Desmond Oh; Kelvin Ong	Team	183.25	1 Q	India (IND); W 166.00–93.67		Hong Kong (HKG); W 107–52	1st place, gold medalist(s)

Women

Athlete	Event	Qualification		Semifinal		Final	
Athlete	Event	Point	Rank	Point	Rank	Point	Rank
Tan Yoke Lan; Ng Lai Chun	Pair	856.1	11 Q	667.6	15	Did not advance	
Soh Siew Luie; Petrina Leo	Pair	798.1	17	Did not advance			
Lian Sui Sim; Leong Jia Min	Pair	734.6	20	Did not advance			

Mixed

Athlete	Event	Qualification		Semifinal		Final	
Athlete	Event	Point	Rank	Point	Rank	Point	Rank
Kelvin Ng; Lam Ze Ying	Pair	1209.9	12 Q	716.6	11 Q	323	9
Lam Cheng Yen; Low Siok Hui	Pair	1201.7	13 Q	745.4	3 Q	308	12
Kenneth Chan; Lim Jing Xuan	Pair	1173.4	18	Did not advance			
Lam Ze Ying; Lim Jing Xuan; Low Siok Hui; Kenneth Chan; Lam Cheng Yen; Kelvin Ng	Team	117.70	6	Did not advance			
Tan Sock Ngin; Selene Tan; Seet Choon Cheng; Luo Cheng; Chua Gang; Peter Haw	Supermixed team	89.46	6	Did not advance			

== Cycling ==
=== Road ===
Athlete	Event	Final	
Athlete	Event	Time	Rank
Choo Ling Er	Women's time trial	36:34.16	10

=== Track ===
Pursuit

Athlete	Event	Qualification		Final	
Athlete	Event	Time	Rank	Opposition Time	Rank
Luo Yiwei	Women's pursuit	3:51.700	7	Did not advance	

Omnium

Athlete	Event	Scratch race		Tempo race		Elimination race		Points race		Total points	Rank
Athlete	Event	Rank	Points	Rank	Points	Rank	Points	Rank	Points	Total points	Rank
Calvin Sim	Men's omnium	14	14	11	1	13	16	14	0	50	15
Luo Yiwei	Women's omnium	11	20	7	0	9	24	9	−15	57	9

== Diving ==
Men

Athlete	Event	Preliminaries		Final	
Athlete	Event	Points	Rank	Points	Rank
Mark Lee; Timothy Lee	3 m synchronized springboard	—		356.37	5
Jonathan Chan; Joshua Chong	10 m synchronized platform	—		291.66	8

Women

Athlete	Event	Preliminaries		Final	
Athlete	Event	Points	Rank	Points	Rank
Myra Lee	10 m platform	226.15	10 Q	236.95	9
Freida Lim	10 m platform	238.00	9 Q	283.35	7
Fong Kay Yian; Ashlee Tan	3 m synchronized springboard	—		245.34	6
Myra Lee; Freida Lim	10 m synchronized platform	—		258.90	6

== Equestrian ==
Singapore represented by two riders compete at the equestrian dressage event.

Dressage

Athlete	Horse	Event	Prix St-Georges		Intermediate I		Intermediate I Freestyle	
Athlete	Horse	Event	Score	Rank	Score	Rank	Score	Rank
Roshni Ranjani Pannirselvam	Dancing Boy 20	Individual	64.382	22 Q	62.764	23	Did not advance	
Alla Poloumieva	Dornkaart	Individual	65.146	19 Q	61.499	24	Did not advance	

== Fencing ==
Individual

Athlete	Event	Preliminary		Round of 32	Round of 16	Quarterfinals	Semifinals	Final	
Athlete	Event	Opposition Score	Rank	Opposition Score	Opposition Score	Opposition Score	Opposition Score	Opposition Score	Rank
Kevin Jerrold Chan	Men's foil	Ma JF (CHN): L 3–5; Ha T-g (KOR): L 2–5; S Doungpatra (THA): W 5–2; Chen C-c (TPE): W 5–3; BW Louie (PHI): L 1–5	4 Q	Cheng XH (MAS); W 15–8	T Shikine (JPN); W 15–12	Huang MK (CHN); L 11–15	Did not advance		8
Joshua Ian Lim	Men's foil	MP Bhatt (NEP): W 5–1; Huang MK (CHN): W 5–4; Hoàng NH (VIE): L 1–5; T Shikine (JPN): L 1–5; C Theara (CAM): W 5–1	4 Q	T Kaliyev (KAZ); W 15–10	Son Y-k (KOR); L 6–15	Did not advance			13
Cheryl Lim	Women's épée	Goh BH (MAS): W 5–2; A Alibekova (KAZ): W 5–4; Sun YW (CHN): L 0–5; A Riyati (INA): W 4–2; KA Khamitova (KGZ): W 5–2	2 Q	Goh BH (MAS); W 14–8	S Komata (JPN); L 10–15	Did not advance			10
Victoria Ann Lim	Women's épée	Zhu MY (CHN): L 2–5; W Al-Bdulla (QAT): W 5–1; W Takhamwong (THA): W 5–4; R Alshamma (UAE): W 5–2; K Hsieh (HKG): L 2–5	4 Q	G Baatarchuluun (MGL); W 15–9	Kang Y-m (KOR); L 8–15	Did not advance			13
Amita Berthier	Women's foil	M Ananda (INA): W 5–0; S Azuma (JPN): L 3–5; MI Esteban (PHI): W 5–4; T Fong (MAS): W 5–0; Huo XX (CHN): W 5–3	2 Q	Bye	Huo XX (CHN); L 8–15	Did not advance			9
Maxine Wong	Women's foil	Đỗ TA (VIE): L 3–5; KV Cheung (HKG): W 5–4; Yang C-m (TPE): W 5–2; Nam H-h (KOR): W 5–1; K Siribrahmanakul (THA): W 5–1	1 Q	Bye	Yang C-m (TPE); W 15–8	Jeon H-s (KOR); L 7–15	Did not advance		5
Ywen Lau	Women's sabre	A Sarybay (KAZ): W 5–4; P Ngernrungruangroj (THA): W 5–3; Shao YQ (CHN): L 1–5; K Chang (HKG): L 2–5	4 Q	Bye	N Tamura (JPN); L 7–15	Did not advance			13

Team

Athlete	Event	Round of 16	Quarterfinals	Semifinals	Final	
Athlete	Event	Opposition Score	Opposition Score	Opposition Score	Opposition Score	Rank
Kevin Jerrold Chan; Joshua Ian Lim; Darren Tan; Zhang Zhenggang	Men's foil	Bye	Japan (JPN); L 29–45	Did not advance		5
Kiria Tikanah Abdul Rahman; Cheryl Lim; Elizabeth Ann Lim; Victoria Ann Lim	Women's épée	Bye	Japan (JPN); L 38–45	Did not advance		5
Amita Berthier; Melanie Huang; Maxine Wong; Tatiana Wong	Women's foil	Bye	Chinese Taipei (TPE); W 45–19	China (CHN); L 14–45	Did not advance	3rd place, bronze medalist(s)

== Golf ==
Singapore announced 4 men's golfers for the Games. Gregory Foo and Joshua Ho was part of the Singapore team that won the gold medal at the 2017 Southeast Asian Games.

Men

Athlete	Event	Round 1	Round 2	Round 3	Round 4	Total		
Athlete	Event	Score	Score	Score	Score	Score	Par	Rank
Gregory Raymund Foo Yongen	Individual	70	71	71	72	284	−4	8
Joshua Ho	Individual	79	78	73	74	304	+16	44
Low Wee Jin	Individual	75	78	76	77	306	+18	47
Abdul Hadi	Individual	76	69	68	75	288	E	20
Gregory Raymund Foo Yongen; Joshua Ho; Low Wee Jin; Abdul Hadi	Team	221	218	212	221	872	+8	9

== Gymnastics ==
Four gymnasts (2 men's and 2 women's) have qualified to compete at the Games.

=== Artistic ===
Men
Individual finals

Athlete	Event	Apparatus						Total	Rank
Athlete	Event	F	PH	R	V	PB	HB	Total	Rank
Hoe Wah Toon	Vault	—				—			
Hoe Wah Toon	Floor		—						
Terry Tay Wei-An	Vault	—				—			
Terry Tay Wei-An	Floor		—						

Women
Individual finals

Athlete	Event	Apparatus				Total	Rank
Athlete	Event	F	UB	BB	V	Total	Rank
Tan Sze En	All-around						
Tan Sze En	Uneven bars	—		—			
Nadine Joy Nathan	Vault	—					

== Ju-jitsu ==
Singapore entered 7 athletes (5 men's and 2 women's) to make their debut at the Asian Games. Constance Lien reached the women's ne-waza 62 kg event finals and clinched the silver medal.

Key:

- ADV – Won by advantages.
- RDC – Won by referee decision.
- SUB – Won by submission.

Men

Athlete	Event	Round of 64	Round of 32	Round of 16	Quarterfinals	Semifinals	Repechage	Final / BM	Rank
Athlete	Event	Opposition Result	Opposition Result	Opposition Result	Opposition Result	Opposition Result	Opposition Result	Opposition Result	Rank
Daryl Chia	–62 kg	—	A Zhanibek (KAZ); L 0–3	Did not advance					
Calvin Chua	–62 kg	—	CA Pena (PHI); L 0–10	Did not advance					
Ivan Chua	–69 kg	—	Bye	B Lertthaisong (THA); L 0–0^{ADV}	Did not advance				
Quek Kon Hui	–77 kg	Bye	Willy (INA); L 0–3	Did not advance					
Ng Wee Kok	–85 kg	—	Bye	A Abdulloev (TJK); L 0–100^{SUB}	Did not advance				

Women

Athlete	Event	Round of 32	Round of 16	Quarterfinals	Semifinals	Repechage	Final / BM	Rank
Athlete	Event	Opposition Result	Opposition Result	Opposition Result	Opposition Result	Opposition Result	Opposition Result	Rank
Constance Lien	–62 kg	B Buyandelger (MGL); W 100^{SUB}–0	O Sangsirichok (THA); W 100^{SUB}–0	S Julia (INA); W 12–0	W Krowýakowa (TKM); W 6–0	—	Sung K-r (KOR); L 2–4	2nd place, silver medalist(s)
May Ooi	–62 kg	Bye	H Al-Shamsi (UAE); L 0–0^{ADV}	Did not advance				

== Paragliding ==
The SNOC sent Goh See Fen to make her debut at the Asian Games.

Women

Athlete	Event	Round										Total	Rank
Athlete	Event	1	2	3	4	5	6	7	8	9	10	Total	Rank
Goh Soo Fen	Individual accuracy	~~500~~	500	43	17	13	2	500	19	57	500	1651	9
Goh Soo Fen	Team accuracy	1500	1500	1043	1017	1013	1002	—				7075	8
Goh Soo Fen	Cross-country	101	157	191	118	124	—					691	7

== Pencak silat ==
Seni

Athlete	Event	Preliminary		Final	
Athlete	Event	Result	Rank	Result	Rank
Iqbal Abdul Rahman	Men's tunggal	458	2 Q	432	5
Shakir Juanda; Hamillatu Arash Juffrie	Men's ganda	—		550	5
Nujaid Hasif; Hamillatu Arash Juffrie; Nazrul Mohd Kamal	Men's regu	—		444	5
Nurzuhairah Yazid	Women's tunggal	441	3 Q	445	2nd place, silver medalist(s)
Nur Azlyana Ismail; Nurhanishah Shahrudin	Women's ganda	—		549	4
Nurzuhairah Yazid; Nurul Syafiqah Faizul; Siti Nazurah Yusoff	Women's regu	—		447	4

Tanding

Athlete	Event	Round of 16	Quarterfinals	Semifinals	Final	
Athlete	Event	Opposition Result	Opposition Result	Opposition Result	Opposition Result	Rank
Raaziq Rashid	Men's –65 kg	M Vongphakdy (LAO); L 1–4	Did not advance			
Shakir Juanda	Men's –70 kg	Bye	KHA Putra (INA); L 0–5	Did not advance		
Nur Alfian Juma'en	Men's –75 kg	K Kubaha (THA); L 0–5	Did not advance			
Sheik Ferdous Alau'ddin	Men's –90 kg	—	B Hashemzadeh (IRI); W 5–0	R Sobri (MAS); W 5–0	AB Pamungkas (INA); L 0–5	2nd place, silver medalist(s)
Sheik Farhan Alau'ddin	Men's –95 kg	Bye	Febrianto (INA); DSQ	Nguyễn VT (VIE); L 0–5	Did not advance	3rd place, bronze medalist(s)
Nurul Shafiqah Saiful	Women's –55 kg	Bye	Z Foroughinasab (IRI); W 5–0	Trần TT (VIE); L 1–4	Did not advance	3rd place, bronze medalist(s)
Siti Khadijah Shahrem	Women's –60 kg	Bye	P Kueakoboon (MAS); W 3–2	NO Vongphakdy (LAO); L 2–3	Did not advance	3rd place, bronze medalist(s)
Nurul Suhaila	Women's –65 kg	—	P Kamelia (INA); L 0–5	Did not advance		

== Rowing ==
The Singapore Rowing represented by Joan Poh Xue Hua in the W1X category.

Women

Athlete	Event	Heats		Repechage		Final	
Athlete	Event	Time	Rank	Time	Rank	Time	Rank
Joan Poh	Single sculls	9:48.40	5 R	9:09.85	4 FB	9:00.45	9

== Rugby sevens ==
Singapore women's rugby sevens team competed at the Games in group A.

Team	Event	Group Stage				Quarterfinal	Semifinal / Pl.	Final / BM / Pl.	
Team	Event	Opposition Score	Opposition Score	Opposition Score	Rank	Opposition Score	Opposition Score	Opposition Score	Rank
Singapore women's	Women's tournament	Hong Kong; L 7–26	South Korea; W 22–17	China; L 0–41	3 Q	Kazakhstan; L 0–34	South Korea; W 17–7	Hong Kong; L 0–45	6

=== Women's tournament ===
Squad

The following is the Singapore squad in the women's rugby sevens tournament of the 2018 Asian Games.

Head coach: Wang Shao Ing

- Chan Jia Yu
- Sim Chiew Hong
- Ong Pei Yi
- Eunice Chu
- Nur S. Mohd Abdul Gaffoor
- Jayne Chan
- Christabelle Lim
- Low Yu Hui
- Alvinia Ow Yong
- Arra Heloise Castro Huab
- Rachel Wang
- Amanda Ng

Group A

Pos	Team	Pld	W	D	L	PF	PA	PD	Pts	Qualification
1	China	3	3	0	0	142	7	+135	9	Quarterfinals
2	Hong Kong	3	2	0	1	71	39	+32	7	Quarterfinals
3	Singapore	3	1	0	2	29	84	−55	5	Quarterfinals
4	South Korea	3	0	0	3	17	129	−112	3	Quarterfinals

Source: Results

30 August
11:22

Hong Kong	26–7	Singapore
Try: Kwong 2' c Olson-Thorne 6' c V. Poon 9' m Chong 10' c Con: V. Poon (2/3); Chong (1/1)		Try: Low 14+' c Con: Lim (1/1)

Gelora Bung Karno Rugby Field, Jakarta
Referee: Suguru Kamamuta (Japan)

30 August
14:40

Singapore	22–17	South Korea
Try: Sim 2' m Abdul Gaffor 6' c Chan J.Y. 8' m J. Chan 14+' m Con: Ow Yong (0/1); Abdul Gaffor (1/3)		Try: Gwon 7' c Yang 7+' m Lee 12' m Con: Lee (1/3)

Gelora Bung Karno Rugby Field, Jakarta
Referee: Phoenix Xu (China)

31 August
10:30

China	41–0	Singapore
Try: Hu 1' m Liu (2) 7' c, 11' m Chen M. (2) 8' c, 9' m Yan 13' m Lu 14+' c Con: Chen M. (2/5); Yu X. (0/1); Chen K. (1/1)

Gelora Bung Karno Rugby Field, Jakarta
Referee: Sakurako Kawasaki (Japan)

Quarterfinal

31 August
15:24

Singapore	0–34	Kazakhstan
		Try: Korotkikh (2) 1' c, 9' m Nurmatova 3' c Baktybayeva (2) 7+' m, 11' m Tkachyova 14+' m Con: Baktybayeva (2/5); Nurmatova (0/1)

Gelora Bung Karno Rugby Field, Jakarta
Referee: Sakurako Kawasaki (Japan)

Classification semifinal (5–8)

1 September
15:06

Singapore	17–7	South Korea
Try: Sim 6' m Abdul Gaffor 9' m Low 14' c Con: Abdul Gaffor (0/2); Ow Yong (1/1)		Try: Lim 3' c Con: Lee (1/1)

Gelora Bung Karno Rugby Field, Jakarta
Referee: Ai Yoshida (Japan)

Fifth place game

1 September
19:08

Hong Kong	45–0	Singapore
Try: Olson-Thorne (2) 3' m, 14' c Kwong 7' c Chong 7+' m A. Poon 10' c S. Chan 13' c Nam 14+' c Con: S. Chan (3/5); A. Poon (2/2)

Gelora Bung Karno Rugby Field, Jakarta
Referee: Phoenix Xu (China)

== Sailing ==
Men

Athlete	Event	Race															Total	Rank
Athlete	Event	1	2	3	4	5	6	7	8	9	10	11	12	13	14	15	Total	Rank
Ryan Lo	Laser	1	~~(4)~~	3	3	1	2	2	3	2	2	3	1	—			23	3rd place, bronze medalist(s)
Koh Yinian; Wong Riji	49er	2	~~(8)~~	6	6	8	6	5	6	3	7	2	5	3	5	2	66	6
Daniel Toh; Xavier Ng	470	7	7	8	7	8	~~(9)~~	8	5	8	8	5	5	—			76	8

Women

Athlete	Event	Race															Total	Rank
Athlete	Event	1	2	3	4	5	6	7	8	9	10	11	12	13	14	15	Total	Rank
Amanda Ng	RS:X	4	4	3	3	4	5	4	4	~~(6)~~	6	4	5	4	6	3	59	4
Jillian Lee	Laser Radial	5	6	6	6	9	6	8	4	6	4	~~(11)~~; DNF	3	—			63	6
Kimberly Lim; Cecilia Low	49er FX	~~(1)~~	1	1	1	1	1	1	1	1	1	1	1	1	1	1	14	1st place, gold medalist(s)
Yukie Yokoyama; Cheryl Teo	470	3	4	4	~~(5)~~	3	4	4	4	4	4	2	2	—			38	4

Mixed

Athlete	Event	Race															Total	Rank
Athlete	Event	1	2	3	4	5	6	7	8	9	10	11	12	13	14	15	Total	Rank
Daniel Hung	Laser 4.7	4	4	13	12	9	10	14	9	~~(24)~~; UFD	6	2	11	—			94	11
Jodie Lai	Laser 4.7	14	16	18	~~(20)~~	15	14	16	17	6	15	5	19	—			155	17
Reynold Chan; Ynez Lim	RS:One	12	12	12	13	~~(14)~~	14	8	14	14	14	14	14	13	13	12	179	7

== Sepak takraw ==
Men

Athlete	Event	Group Stage					Semifinal	Final	
Athlete	Event	Opposition score	Opposition score	Opposition score	Opposition score	Rank	Opposition score	Opposition score	Rank
Afif Safiee; Farhan Aman; Mohd Asri Aron; Asfandi Ja'al; Farhan Amran	Regu	Pakistan (PAK); W 2–0	Philippines (PHI); W 2–1	Indonesia (INA); L 0–2	—	2 Q	Malaysia (MAS); L 0–2	Did not advance	3rd place, bronze medalist(s)
Mohd Al-Haj Kasmanani; Afif Safiee; Farhan Aman; Khairilshamy Shamsudin; Mohd Asri Aron; Farhan Amran	Quadrant	Pakistan (PAK); W 2–0	Nepal (NEP); W 2–0	Vietnam (VIE); L 1–2	Iran (IRI); W 2–0	2 Q	Indonesia (INA); L 0–2	Did not advance	3rd place, bronze medalist(s)

== Shooting ==
Men

Athlete	Event	Qualification		Final	
Athlete	Event	Points	Rank	Points	Rank
Gai Bin	10 m air pistol	578	10	Did not advance	
Wong Han Xuan	10 m air pistol	565	29	Did not advance	
Irwan Abdul Rahman	10 m air rifle	622.1	13	Did not advance	
Sng Jian Hui	10 m air rifle	616.6	26	Did not advance	

Women

Athlete	Event	Qualification		Final	
Athlete	Event	Points	Rank	Points	Rank
Shirlene Hew	10 m air pistol	557	25	Did not advance	
Teh Xiu Hong	10 m air pistol	570	9	Did not advance	
Nicole Tan	25 m pistol	572	20	Did not advance	
Teh Xiu Hong	25 m pistol	576	14	Did not advance	
Jasmine Ser	10 m air rifle	620.9	13	Did not advance	
Martina Veloso	10 m air rifle	624.3	7 Q	164.0	6
Jasmine Ser	50 m rifle three positions	1171	3 Q	430.9	4
Martina Veloso	50 m rifle three positions	1160	8 Q	397.2	8

Mixed team

Athlete	Event	Qualification		Final	
Athlete	Event	Points	Rank	Points	Rank
Gai Bin; Teh Xiu Hong	10 m air pistol	753	12	Did not advance	
Irwan Abdul Rahman; Martina Veloso	10 m air rifle	829.7	6	Did not advance	

== Sport climbing ==
Speed

Athlete	Event	Qualification		Round of 16	Quarterfinals	Semifinals	Final / BM	
Athlete	Event	Best	Rank	Opposition Time	Opposition Time	Opposition Time	Opposition Time	Rank
Amar Hassan Kamal	Men's	7.425	15 Q	R Alipour (IRI); L 8.505–6.426	Did not advance			14
Emmanuel Ryan Paul	Men's	7.000	10 Q	M Alipour (IRI); L F–7.940	Did not advance			15
Nadhrah Yusri	Women's	11.243	14 Q	He CL (CHN); L 11.184–8.828	Did not advance			13
Nadirah Azmie	Women's	DNS	20	Did not advance				

Speed relay

Athlete	Event	Qualification		Quarterfinals	Semifinals	Final / BM	
Athlete	Event	Time	Rank	Opposition Time	Opposition Time	Opposition Time	Rank
Amar Hassan Kamal; Emmanuel Ryan Paul; Tay Kuan Liang	Men's	26.289	11	Did not advance			
Stefanie Ann Low; Vanessa Teng; Nadhrah Yusri	Women's	41.421	10	Did not advance			

Combined

Athlete	Event	Qualification					Final				
Athlete	Event	Speed Point	Boulder Point	Lead Point	Total	Rank	Speed Point	Boulder Point	Lead Point	Total	Rank
Vanessa Teng	Women's	16	5	9	720	12	Did not advance				

== Squash ==
Singles

Athlete	Event	Round of 32	Round of 16	Quarterfinals	Semifinals	Final	
Athlete	Event	Opposition Score	Opposition Score	Opposition Score	Opposition Score	Opposition Score	Rank
Samuel Kang	Men's	A Shameli (IRI); L 0–3	Did not advance				
Timothy Leong	Men's	R A Garcia (PHI); L 0–3	Did not advance				

Team

Athlete	Event	Group Stage						Semifinal	Final	
Athlete	Event	Opposition score	Opposition score	Opposition score	Opposition score	Opposition score	Rank	Opposition score	Opposition score	Rank
Timothy Leong; Samuel Kang; Benedict Chan; Pang Ka Hoe	Men's	Malaysia (MAS); L 0–3	India (IND); L 0–3	Thailand (THA); W 3–0	Indonesia (INA); W 3–0	Qatar (QAT); W 2–1	3	Did not advance		

== Swimming ==
Men

Athlete	Event	Heats		Final	
Athlete	Event	Time	Rank	Time	Rank
Christopher Cheong	50 m breaststroke	29.09	18	Did not advance	
Christopher Cheong	100 m breaststroke	1:03.28	16	Did not advance	
Francis Fong	50 m backstroke	26.48	14	Did not advance	
Francis Fong	100 m backstroke	56.09	9	Did not advance	
Francis Fong	200 m backstroke	2:03.35	8 Q	2:06.16	8
Lionel Khoo	50 m breaststroke	28.19	9	Did not advance	
Lionel Khoo	100 m breaststroke	1:02.00	8 Q	1:01.74	8
Lionel Khoo	200 m breaststroke	2:17.62	14	Did not advance	
Lionel Khoo	200 m individual medley	2:06.12	12	Did not advance	
Darren Lim	100 m freestyle	50.01	11	Did not advance	
Glen Lim	400 m freestyle	3:55.59	11	Did not advance	
Glen Lim	800 m freestyle	—		8:11.59	9
Glen Lim	1500 m freestyle	—		15:45.04	11
Ong Jung Yi	200 m butterfly	2:03.28	12	Did not advance	
Pang Sheng Jun	400 m freestyle	4:01.26	13	Did not advance	
Pang Sheng Jun	200 m individual medley	2:02.64	7 Q	2:03.08	8
Pang Sheng Jun	400 m individual medley	4:29.94	12	Did not advance	
Quah Zheng Wen	50 m backstroke	25.54	6 Q	25.53	6
Quah Zheng Wen	200 m backstroke	2:02.68	6 Q	–	
Quah Zheng Wen	100 m butterfly	52.76	4 Q	52.54	4
Quah Zheng Wen	200 m butterfly	1:59.17	7 Q	1:57.95	6
Joseph Schooling	50 m freestyle	23.05	17	Did not advance	
Joseph Schooling	50 m butterfly	23.84	1 Q	23.61	1st place, gold medalist(s)
Joseph Schooling	100 m butterfly	52.31	1 Q	51.04 (GR)	1st place, gold medalist(s)
Jonathan Tan	200 m freestyle	1:51.52	14	Did not advance	
Zachary Ian Tan	200 m breaststroke	2:17.01	12	Did not advance	
Zachary Ian Tan	400 m individual medley	4:29.87	11	Did not advance	
Teong Tzen Wei	50 m freestyle	22.56	5 Q	22.59	6
Teong Tzen Wei	50 m butterfly	24.28	9	Did not advance	
Danny Yeo	100 m freestyle	50.93	21	Did not advance	
Danny Yeo	200 m freestyle	1:50.39	9	Did not advance	
Quah Zheng Wen; Joseph Schooling; Darren Chua; Darren Lim; Danny Yeo^{[b]} Jonathan Tan^{[b]}	4×100 m freestyle relay	3:20.16	3 Q	3:17.22	3rd place, bronze medalist(s)
Quah Zheng Wen; Joseph Schooling; Danny Yeo; Jonathan Tan; Darren Chua^{[b]} Glen Lim^{[b]}	4×200 m freestyle relay	7:25.62	3 Q	7:14.15	3rd place, bronze medalist(s)
Quah Zheng Wen; Lionel Khoo; Joseph Schooling; Darren Chua; Darren Lim^{[a]}	4×100 m medley relay	3:39.69	4 Q	3:37.68	4

^{a} Swimmers who participated in the heats only.
^{b} Swimmers who participated in the heats only and received medals.

Women

Athlete	Event	Heats		Final	
Athlete	Event	Time	Rank	Time	Rank
Christie Chue	100 m freestyle	56.91	9	Did not advance	
Christie Chue	200 m freestyle	2:03.78	10	Did not advance	
Gan Ching Hwee	400 m freestyle	4:19.70	5 Q	4:17.86	6
Gan Ching Hwee	800 m freestyle	—		8:47.07	5
Gan Ching Hwee	1500 m freestyle	—		16:39.70	5
Roanne Ho	50 m breaststroke	31.59	6 Q	31.23	2nd place, silver medalist(s)
Roanne Ho	100 m breaststroke	1:12.01	13	Did not advance	
Hoong En Qi	50 m backstroke	29.90	11	Did not advance	
Hoong En Qi	100 m backstroke	1:04.94	11	Did not advance	
Hoong En Qi	200 m backstroke	2:26.30	14	Did not advance	
Chantal Liew	400 m freestyle	4:29.47	10	Did not advance	
Chantal Liew	800 m freestyle	—		9:13.87	13
Chantal Liew	50 m backstroke	30.47	15	Did not advance	
Chantal Liew	100 m backstroke	1:05.68	15	Did not advance	
Chantal Liew	200 m backstroke	2:25.88	13	Did not advance	
Amanda Lim	50 m freestyle	25.73	6 Q	25.47	5
Quah Jing Wen	50 m butterfly	27.31	9	Did not advance	
Quah Jing Wen	100 m butterfly	1:00.08	7 Q	58.93	6
Quah Jing Wen	200 m butterfly	2:13.35	6 Q	2:12.01	5
Quah Jing Wen	200 m individual medley	2:19.26	10	Did not advance	
Quah Ting Wen	50 m freestyle	25.65	5 Q	25.48	6
Quah Ting Wen	50 m butterfly	27.28	8 Q	26.73	6
Quah Ting Wen	100 m butterfly	1:00.41	9	Did not advance	
Samantha Yeo	50 m breaststroke	32.74	14	Did not advance	
Samantha Yeo	100 m breaststroke	1:11.29	12	Did not advance	
Samantha Yeo	200 m breaststroke	2:33.74	7 Q	2:33.75	8
Samantha Yeo	200 m individual medley	2:18.99	9	Did not advance	
Cherlyn Yeoh	100 m freestyle	57.39	11	Did not advance	
Cherlyn Yeoh	200 m freestyle	2:07.96	16	Did not advance	
Quah Jing Wen; Quah Ting Wen; Christie Chue; Cherlyn Yeoh; Marina Chan^{[a]} Amanda Lim^{[a]}	4×100 m freestyle relay	3:45.99	4 Q	3:44.21	4
Quah Ting Wen; Christie Chue; Cherlyn Yeoh; Gan Ching Hwee; Marina Chan^{[a]}	4×200 m freestyle relay	8:25.66	4 Q	8:15.12	5
Hoong En Qi; Samantha Yeo; Quah Jing Wen; Quah Ting Wen; Cherlyn Yeoh^{[b]}	4×100 m medley relay	4:12.73	4 Q	4:09.65	3rd place, bronze medalist(s)

^{a} Swimmers who participated in the heats only.
^{b} Swimmers who participated in the heats only and received medals.

Mixed

Athlete	Event	Heats		Final	
Athlete	Event	Time	Rank	Time	Rank
Francis Fong; Lionel Khoo; Quah Jing Wen; Quah Ting Wen; Samantha Yeo^{[a]} Ong Jung Yi^{[a]} Marina Chan^{[a]}	4×100 m mixed medley relay	3:59.87	7 Q	DSQ	

^{a} Swimmers who participated in the heats only.

== Table tennis ==
Singapore entered the table tennis competition with one men and 5 women's players. Zhou Yihan who suffered a wrist injury had been replaced by Pearlyn Koh.

Individual

Athlete	Event	Round 1	Round 2	Round of 16	Quarterfinals	Semifinals	Final	
Athlete	Event	Opposition Score	Opposition Score	Opposition Score	Opposition Score	Opposition Score	Opposition Score	Rank
Gao Ning	Men's singles	Bye	M Abdulhussein (QAT); W 4–0	Lin GY (CHN); L 1–4	Did not advance			
Feng Tianwei	Women's singles	Bye	AI Ansari (PAK); W 4–0	Jeon J-h (KOR); L 0–4	Did not advance			
Yu Mengyu	Women's singles	Bye	A Chan (MAS); W 4–1	Doo HK (HKG); W 4–3	Cheng I-c (TPE); W 4–1	Wang MY (CHN); L 1–4	Did not advance	3rd place, bronze medalist(s)
Gao Ning; Yu Mengyu	Mixed doubles	Bye	Dinh QL / Mai HMT (VIE); W 3–1	Wong CT / Doo HK (HKG); W 3–1	Wang CQ / Sun YS (CHN); L 0–3	Did not advance		

Team

Athlete	Event	Group Stage					Quarterfinal	Semifinal	Final	
Athlete	Event	Opposition score	Opposition score	Opposition score	Opposition score	Rank	Opposition score	Opposition score	Opposition score	Rank
Feng Tianwei; Zhang Wanling; Yu Mengyu; Lin Ye; Pearlyn Koh	Women's	Nepal (NEP); W 3–0	Hong Kong (HKG); L 1–3	Vietnam (VIE); W 3–0	Malaysia (MAS); W 3–0	2 Q	South Korea (KOR); L 1–3	Did not advance		

== Water polo ==
Summary

Key:

- FT – After full time.
- P – Match decided by penalty-shootout.

Team	Event	Group Stage				Quarterfinal	Semifinal / Pl.	Final / BM / Pl.	
Team	Event	Opposition Score	Opposition Score	Opposition Score	Rank	Opposition Score	Opposition Score	Opposition Score	Rank
Singapore men's	Men's tournament	Iran; L 5–11	Kazakhstan; L 4–15	South Korea; L 7–10	4 Q	Japan; L 6–28	Saudi Arabia; W 6–5	South Korea; L 10–12	6

=== Men's tournament ===
Team roster

Head coach: (Serbia) Dejan Milaković

1. Darren Lee (GK)
2. Loh Zhi shi (CB) (C)
3. Ooi Yee Jia (D)
4. Chow Jing Lun (D)
5. Glen Lim (D)
6. Samuel Yu (CF)
7. Chiam Kun Yang (D)
8. Ang An Jun (CB)
9. Yu Junjie (CF)
10. Sean Ang (D)
11. Lee Cheng Kang (D)
12. Koh Jian Ying (D)
13. Lee Kai Yang (GK)

Group A

Pos	Team	Pld	W	D	L	GF	GA	GD	Pts	Qualification
1	Kazakhstan	3	3	0	0	40	18	+22	6	Quarterfinals
2	Iran	3	2	0	1	32	25	+7	4	Quarterfinals
3	South Korea	3	1	0	2	30	39	−9	2	Quarterfinals
4	Singapore	3	0	0	3	16	36	−20	0	Quarterfinals

Source: OCA

25 August; 10:20	Singapore	5–11	Iran	Gelora Bung Karno Aquatic Stadium, Jakarta; Referees: Stavridis (GRE), Štampalija (CRO)
25 August; 10:20	Score by quarters: 3–4, 0–3, 2–3, 0–1			Gelora Bung Karno Aquatic Stadium, Jakarta; Referees: Stavridis (GRE), Štampalija (CRO)
25 August; 10:20	Koh 3	Goals	Yazdankhah, Abbasi 3	Gelora Bung Karno Aquatic Stadium, Jakarta; Referees: Stavridis (GRE), Štampalija (CRO)

27 August; 14:30	Kazakhstan	15–4	Singapore	Gelora Bung Karno Aquatic Stadium, Jakarta; Referees: Ni (CHN), Safabakhsh (IRI)
27 August; 14:30	Score by quarters: 4–0, 5–1, 4–2, 2–1			Gelora Bung Karno Aquatic Stadium, Jakarta; Referees: Ni (CHN), Safabakhsh (IRI)
27 August; 14:30	Ukumanov 5	Goals	four players 1	Gelora Bung Karno Aquatic Stadium, Jakarta; Referees: Ni (CHN), Safabakhsh (IRI)

29 August; 14:30	Singapore	7–10	South Korea	Gelora Bung Karno Aquatic Stadium, Jakarta; Referees: Štampalija (CRO), Tahara (JPN)
29 August; 14:30	Score by quarters: 1–2, 1–4, 2–2, 3–2			Gelora Bung Karno Aquatic Stadium, Jakarta; Referees: Štampalija (CRO), Tahara (JPN)
29 August; 14:30	Koh 2	Goals	Chu 3	Gelora Bung Karno Aquatic Stadium, Jakarta; Referees: Štampalija (CRO), Tahara (JPN)

Quarter-final

30 August; 17:50	Singapore	6–28	Japan	Gelora Bung Karno Aquatic Stadium, Jakarta; Referees: Stavridis (GRE), Salnichenko (KAZ)
30 August; 17:50	Score by quarters: 2–5, 1–8, 2–10, 1–5			Gelora Bung Karno Aquatic Stadium, Jakarta; Referees: Stavridis (GRE), Salnichenko (KAZ)
30 August; 17:50	Loh, S. Yu 2	Goals	Inaba 5	Gelora Bung Karno Aquatic Stadium, Jakarta; Referees: Stavridis (GRE), Salnichenko (KAZ)

Classification semifinal (5–8)

31 August; 9:00	Saudi Arabia	5–6	Singapore	Gelora Bung Karno Aquatic Stadium, Jakarta; Referees: Ni (CHN), Safabakhsh (IRI)
31 August; 9:00	Score by quarters: 3–1, 0–1, 2–0, 0–4			Gelora Bung Karno Aquatic Stadium, Jakarta; Referees: Ni (CHN), Safabakhsh (IRI)
31 August; 9:00	Taleb, Al-Dughather 2	Goals	Koh 2	Gelora Bung Karno Aquatic Stadium, Jakarta; Referees: Ni (CHN), Safabakhsh (IRI)

Fifth place game

1 September; 10:20	Singapore	10–12 (PSO)	South Korea	Gelora Bung Karno Aquatic Stadium, Jakarta; Referees: Safabakhsh (IRI), Ni (CHN)
1 September; 10:20	Score by quarters: 4–3, 1–3, 1–1, 2–1 PSO: 2–4			Gelora Bung Karno Aquatic Stadium, Jakarta; Referees: Safabakhsh (IRI), Ni (CHN)
1 September; 10:20	Koh 4	Goals	Park 5	Gelora Bung Karno Aquatic Stadium, Jakarta; Referees: Safabakhsh (IRI), Ni (CHN)

== Wushu ==
Taolu

Athlete	Event	Event 1		Event 2		Total	Rank
Athlete	Event	Result	Rank	Result	Rank	Total	Rank
Yong Yi Xiang	Men's changquan	9.65	6	—		9.65	6
Jowen Lim	Men's daoshu and gunshu	9.70	3	9.70	4	19.40	4
Vera Tan	Women's taijiquan and taijijian	9.66	6	9.67	4	19.33	5
Ho Lin Ying	Women's taijiquan and taijijian	9.65	7	9.65	6	19.30	6

Sanda

Athlete	Event	Round of 32	Round of 16	Quarterfinal	Semifinal	Final	
Athlete	Event	Opposition score	Opposition score	Opposition score	Opposition score	Opposition score	Rank
Jason Goh	Men's –56 kg	Kan K W (MAC); L 0–2	Did not advance				

== See also ==
- Singapore at the 2018 Asian Para Games
