= Bridge at the 2018 Asian Games – Mixed pair =

Mixed pair at the 2018 Asian Games
- Venue: Jakarta International Expo
- Dates: 28 August – 1 September 2018
- Competitors: 54 from 10 nations

Medalists
gold medal	Yang Hsin-lung; Lu Yi-zu	Chinese Taipei
silver medal	Fan Kang-wei; Tsai Po-ya	Chinese Taipei
bronze medal	Taufik Gautama Asbi; Lusje Olha Bojoh	Indonesia
bronze medal	Terasak Jitngamkusol; Taristchollatorn Chodchoy	Thailand

The contract bridge mixed pair competition at the 2018 Asian Games was held at the Jakarta International Expo, Jakarta, Indonesia from 28 August to 1 September 2018.

== Schedule ==
All times are Western Indonesia Time (UTC+07:00)

Date	Time	Event
Tuesday, 28 August 2018	10:00	Qualification round 1
Tuesday, 28 August 2018	14:30	Qualification round 2
Wednesday, 29 August 2018	10:00	Qualification round 3
Wednesday, 29 August 2018	14:30	Qualification round 4
Thursday, 30 August 2018	10:00	Semifinals 1
Thursday, 30 August 2018	14:30	Semifinals 2
Friday, 31 August 2018	09:30	Semifinals 3
Friday, 31 August 2018	14:30	Finals 1
Saturday, 1 September 2018	10:00	Finals 2

== Results ==
Legend

- DNS — Did not start

=== Qualification round ===
Rank	Team	Session				Total
Rank	Team	1	2	3	4	Total
1	Yang Hsin-lung / Lu Yi-zu (TPE)	357.4	281.0	363.3	317.0	1318.7
2	Takumi Seshimo / Tomoe Nakao (JPN)	414.8	327.0	281.7	289.0	1312.5
3	Robert Parasian / Julita Grace Joice Tueje (INA)	355.7	332.0	301.3	315.0	1304.0
4	Romulo Virola / Cristy Ann de Guzman (PHI)	378.4	292.0	293.6	333.0	1297.0
5	Li Liang / Hu Wen (CHN)	341.4	311.0	266.6	376.0	1295.0
6	Bachiraju Satyanarayana / Kiran Nadar (IND)	368.6	296.0	295.7	333.0	1293.3
7	Terasak Jitngamkusol / Taristchollatorn Chodchoy (THA)	360.6	307.0	322.4	297.0	1287.0
8	Fan Kang-wei / Tsai Po-ya (TPE)	325.3	269.0	367.7	318.0	1280.0
9	Rajeev Khandelwal / Himani Khandelwal (IND)	383.8	324.0	275.3	296.0	1279.1
10	Zhang Yizhuo / Zhu Aiping (CHN)	327.4	344.0	298.4	293.0	1262.8
11	Taufik Gautama Asbi / Lusje Olha Bojoh (INA)	337.6	254.0	319.7	335.0	1246.3
12	Kelvin Ng / Lam Ze Ying (SGP)	349.6	308.0	266.3	286.0	1209.9
13	Lam Cheng Yen / Low Siok Hui (SGP)	328.4	342.0	278.3	253.0	1201.7
14	Bill Mondigir / Elvita Lasut (INA)	367.4	262.0	293.7	276.0	1199.1
15	Kridsadayut Plengsap / Kanokporn Janebunjong (THA)	385.1	267.0	265.6	272.0	1189.7
16	Peeracha Suriya / Jittakan Pachimsawat (THA)	324.8	333.0	262.3	265.0	1185.1
17	Roger Ling / Pauline Ling (HKG)	261.4	295.0	296.1	331.0	1183.5
18	Kenneth Chan / Lim Jing Xuan (SGP)	300.5	280.0	308.9	284.0	1173.4
19	Xun Yonghong / Yang Jinghui (CHN)	316.4	242.0	290.8	321.0	1170.2
20	Toshihiro Katsube / Masako Katsube (JPN)	358.3	243.0	284.7	254.0	1140.0
21	Tetsuya Ueda / Mariko Ueda (JPN)	317.4	266.0	296.3	252.0	1131.7
22	Hsiao Tzu-liang / Wang Jui (TPE)	338.3	245.0	278.3	270.0	1131.6
23	Francisco Alquiros / Gemma Mariano (PHI)	330.6	253.0	223.7	253.0	1060.3
24	Arun Kumar Sinha / Rita Choksi (IND)	253.4	292.0	281.4	223.0	1049.8
25	Khor Shi Jie / Yap Ching Kuan (MAS)	335.7	264.0	231.3	213.0	1044.0
26	Yau Ah Peng / Lee Hung Fong (MAS)	237.4	259.0	241.7	233.0	971.1
—	Kong Te Yang / Victoria Egan (PHI)					DNS

=== Semifinals ===
Rank	Team	Carry over	Session			Total
Rank	Team	Carry over	1	2	3	Total
1	Yang Hsin-lung / Lu Yi-zu (TPE)	202.0	182.0	282.6	107.4	774.0
2	Bachiraju Satyanarayana / Kiran Nadar (IND)	198.0	200.0	250.6	124.1	772.7
3	Lam Cheng Yen / Low Siok Hui (SGP)	184.0	167.0	276.8	117.6	745.4
4	Takumi Seshimo / Tomoe Nakao (JPN)	201.0	187.0	249.6	105.1	742.7
5	Rajeev Khandelwal / Himani Khandelwal (IND)	196.0	182.0	272.7	88.6	739.3
6	Terasak Jitngamkusol / Taristchollatorn Chodchoy (THA)	197.0	162.0	243.5	131.4	733.9
7	Li Liang / Hu Wen (CHN)	198.0	172.0	249.0	113.6	732.6
8	Zhang Yizhuo / Zhu Aiping (CHN)	193.0	198.0	214.8	122.9	728.7
9	Robert Parasian / Julita Grace Joice Tueje (INA)	200.0	158.0	270.1	97.0	725.1
10	Taufik Gautama Asbi / Lusje Olha Bojoh (INA)	191.0	185.0	244.3	101.2	721.5
11	Kelvin Ng / Lam Ze Ying (SGP)	185.0	205.0	213.4	113.2	716.6
12	Fan Kang-wei / Tsai Po-ya (TPE)	196.0	170.0	255.5	84.9	706.4
13	Kridsadayut Plengsap / Kanokporn Janebunjong (THA)	182.0	157.0	241.0	125.0	705.0
14	Bill Mondigir / Elvita Lasut (INA)	184.0	148.0	236.6	100.4	669.0
15	Peeracha Suriya / Jittakan Pachimsawat (THA)	181.0	173.0	232.1	73.9	660.0
16	Romulo Virola / Cristy Ann de Guzman (PHI)	198.0	154.0	184.5	82.1	618.6

=== Finals ===
Rank	Team	Carry over	Session		Total
Rank	Team	Carry over	1	2	Total
1st place, gold medalist(s)	Yang Hsin-lung / Lu Yi-zu (TPE)	61.0	157.0	145.0	363.0
2nd place, silver medalist(s)	Fan Kang-wei / Tsai Po-ya (TPE)	56.0	157.0	144.0	357.0
3rd place, bronze medalist(s)	Taufik Gautama Asbi / Lusje Olha Bojoh (INA)	57.0	166.0	125.0	348.0
3rd place, bronze medalist(s)	Terasak Jitngamkusol / Taristchollatorn Chodchoy (THA)	58.0	177.0	107.0	342.0
5	Bachiraju Satyanarayana / Kiran Nadar (IND)	61.0	127.0	145.0	333.0
6	Zhang Yizhuo / Zhu Aiping (CHN)	57.0	156.0	118.0	331.0
7	Rajeev Khandelwal / Himani Khandelwal (IND)	58.0	153.0	118.0	329.0
8	Li Liang / Hu Wen (CHN)	55.5	126.0	146.0	327.5
9	Kelvin Ng / Lam Ze Ying (SGP)	56.0	136.0	131.0	323.0
10	Robert Parasian / Julita Grace Joice Tueje (INA)	57.0	148.0	113.0	318.0
11	Takumi Seshimo / Tomoe Nakao (JPN)	58.0	155.0	101.0	314.0
12	Lam Cheng Yen / Low Siok Hui (SGP)	59.0	142.0	107.0	308.0
