= Bridge at the 2018 Asian Games – Supermixed team =

Supermixed team at the 2018 Asian Games
- Venue: Jakarta International Expo
- Dates: 21–27 August 2018
- Competitors: 58 from 10 nations

Medalists
gold medal	China; Fu Zhong, Hou Xu, Li Jie, Liu Jing, Shen Qi, Wang Wenfei
silver medal	Hong Kong; Ho Hoi Tung, Ho Wai Lam, Pearlie Chan, Charmian Koo, Flora Wong, Yeung Hoi Ning
bronze medal	Chinese Taipei; Liu Ming-chien, Wang Shao-yu, Chen Yin-shou, Lin Yin-yu, Liu Pei-hua, So Ho-yee
bronze medal	Indonesia; Jemmy Boyke Bojoh, Michael Bambang Hartono, Franky Steven Karwur, Bert Toar Polii, Rury Andhani, Conny Eufke Sumampouw

The contract bridge supermixed team competition at the 2018 Asian Games was held at the Jakarta International Expo, Jakarta, Indonesia from 21 to 27 August 2018.

Teams must consist of men and women pairs playing in partnership. In every match, one women pair has to play against one men pair.

== Schedule ==
All times are Western Indonesia Time (UTC+07:00)

Date	Time	Event
Tuesday, 21 August 2018	10:00	Round robin 1
Tuesday, 21 August 2018	14:00	Round robin 2
Wednesday, 22 August 2018	10:00	Round robin 3
Wednesday, 22 August 2018	14:00	Round robin 4
Thursday, 23 August 2018	10:00	Round robin 5
Thursday, 23 August 2018	14:00	Round robin 6
Friday, 24 August 2018	14:00	Round robin 7
Saturday, 25 August 2018	10:00	Round robin 8
Saturday, 25 August 2018	14:00	Round robin 9
Sunday, 26 August 2018	09:30	Semifinals
Monday, 27 August 2018	10:00	Final

== Squads ==
China	Chinese Taipei	Hong Kong	India
Fu Zhong; Hou Xu; Li Jie; Liu Jing; Shen Qi; Wang Wenfei	Liu Ming-chien; Wang Shao-yu; Chen Yin-shou; Lin Yin-yu; Liu Pei-hua; So Ho-yee	Ho Hoi Tung; Ho Wai Lam; Pearlie Chan; Charmian Koo; Flora Wong; Yeung Hoi Ning	Pranab Bardhan; Finton Lewis; Shibhnath Sarkar; Bharati Dey; Marianne Karmarkar; Vasanti Shah
Indonesia	Malaysia	Pakistan	Philippines
Jemmy Boyke Bojoh; Michael Bambang Hartono; Franky Steven Karwur; Bert Toar Polii; Rury Andhani; Conny Eufke Sumampouw	Khor Shi Jie; Ong Ka Shing; Lee Fee Khoon; Lee Hung Fong; Yap Ching Kuan	Hasan Askari; Rashid-ul-Ghazi; Tehsin Ali Gheewala; Rubina Agha; Fatima Raza	Francisco Alquiros; George Soo; Allen Tan; Cristy Ann de Guzman; Victoria Egan; Gemma Mariano
Singapore	Thailand		
Chua Gang; Peter Haw; Luo Cheng; Seet Choon Cheng; Selene Tan; Tan Sock Ngin	Pornthep Leelasanguan; Asdang Riamsree; Jaturong Sasibut; Pobsook Kamolvej; Pavinee Sitthicharoensawat; Vallapa Svangsopakul		

== Results ==
=== Qualification round ===
Rank	Team	Round									Pen.	Total
Rank	Team	1	2	3	4	5	6	7	8	9	Pen.	Total
1	Chinese Taipei (TPE)	IND; 19.33	PHI; 14.39	THA; 18.01	CHN; 0.67	HKG; 14.39	INA; 5.24	SGP; 8.17	PAK; 18.43	MAS; 19.00		117.63
2	China (CHN)	HKG; 9.45	IND; 8.92	PHI; 12.07	TPE; 19.33	INA; 12.30	MAS; 11.59	THA; 13.20	SGP; 13.81	PAK; 15.77		116.44
3	Indonesia (INA)	PAK; 9.72	SGP; 16.80	MAS; 14.39	THA; 9.18	CHN; 7.70	TPE; 14.76	IND; 17.68	PHI; 16.66	HKG; 2.94	0.50	109.33
4	Hong Kong (HKG)	CHN; 10.55	PAK; 6.80	SGP; 4.72	IND; 10.00	TPE; 5.61	THA; 10.28	PHI; 14.76	MAS; 20.00	INA; 17.06		99.78
5	Pakistan (PAK)	INA; 10.28	HKG; 13.20	IND; 11.59	PHI; 11.59	THA; 19.93	SGP; 17.19	MAS; 10.00	TPE; 1.57	CHN; 4.23		99.58
6	Singapore (SGP)	THA; 13.41	INA; 3.20	HKG; 15.28	MAS; 13.20	PHI; 13.20	PAK; 2.81	TPE; 11.83	CHN; 6.19	IND; 11.34	1.00	89.46
7	Thailand (THA)	SGP; 6.59	MAS; 18.91	TPE; 1.99	INA; 10.82	PAK; 0.07	HKG; 9.72	CHN; 6.80	IND; 13.41	PHI; 13.81	0.50	81.62
8	India (IND)	TPE; 0.67	CHN; 11.08	PAK; 8.41	HKG; 10.00	MAS; 20.00	PHI; 13.81	INA; 2.32	THA; 6.59	SGP; 8.66		81.54
9	Philippines (PHI)	MAS; 16.66	TPE; 5.61	CHN; 7.93	PAK; 8.41	SGP; 6.80	IND; 6.19	HKG; 5.24	INA; 3.34	THA; 6.19		66.37
10	Malaysia (MAS)	PHI; 3.34	THA; 1.09	INA; 5.61	SGP; 6.80	IND; 0.00	CHN; 8.41	PAK; 10.00	HKG; 0.00	TPE; 1.00		36.25

=== Knockout round ===
Semifinals			Final
1	Chinese Taipei	92.33
4	Hong Kong	104.00	4	Hong Kong	37.67
2	China	137.00	2	China	134.00
3	Indonesia	60.00

==== Semifinals ====
Team	Carry over	Segment			Pen.	Total
Team	Carry over	1	2	3	Pen.	Total
Chinese Taipei (TPE)	6.33	20	40	26		92.33
Hong Kong (HKG)	0.00	32	26	46		104.00
China (CHN)	3.00	63	37	34		137.00
Indonesia (INA)	0.00	10	31	19		60.00

==== Final ====
Team	Carry over	Segment			Pen.	Total
Team	Carry over	1	2	3	Pen.	Total
Hong Kong (HKG)	0.67	14	1	22		37.67
China (CHN)	0.00	51	42	41		134.00
