= Bridge at the 2022 Asian Games – Women's team =

Women's team at the 2022 Asian Games
- Venue: Hangzhou Chess Academy
- Dates: 27 September – 6 October 2023
- Competitors: 46 from 8 nations

Medalists
gold medal	China; Huang Yan, Liu Yan, Ran Jingrong, Yu Xiuting
silver medal	Chinese Taipei; Chen Yin-shou, Hsiao Kuan-chu, Lin Yin-yu, Liu Lin-chin, Liu Pei-hua, Yang Ming-ching
bronze medal	Singapore; Leong Jia Min, Li Lan, Lim Jing Xuan, Low Siok Hui, Jazlene Ong, Selene Tan
bronze medal	Hong Kong; Pearlie Chan, Charmian Koo, Tang Tsz In, Joyce Tung, Flora Wong, Yeung Hoi Ning

The contract bridge women's team competition at the 2022 Asian Games was held at Hangzhou Chess Academy, Hangzhou, China from 27 September to 6 October 2023.

== Schedule ==
All times are China Standard Time (UTC+08:00)

Date	Time	Event
Wednesday, 27 September 2023	09:00	Round robin 1–1
Wednesday, 27 September 2023	13:30	Round robin 1–2
Wednesday, 27 September 2023	16:00	Round robin 1–3
Thursday, 28 September 2023	13:30	Round robin 1–4
Thursday, 28 September 2023	16:00	Round robin 1–5
Friday, 29 September 2023	13:30	Round robin 1–6
Friday, 29 September 2023	16:00	Round robin 1–7
Saturday, 30 September 2023	09:00	Round robin 2–1
Saturday, 30 September 2023	13:30	Round robin 2–2
Saturday, 30 September 2023	16:00	Round robin 2–3
Sunday, 1 October 2023	13:30	Round robin 2–4
Sunday, 1 October 2023	16:00	Round robin 2–5
Monday, 2 October 2023	13:30	Round robin 2–6
Monday, 2 October 2023	16:00	Round robin 2–7
Tuesday, 3 October 2023	09:00	Semifinals 1
Wednesday, 4 October 2023	09:00	Semifinals 2
Thursday, 5 October 2023	09:00	Final 1
Friday, 6 October 2023	09:00	Final 2

== Squads ==
China	Chinese Taipei	Hong Kong	India
Huang Yan; Liu Yan; Ran Jingrong; Yu Xiuting	Chen Yin-shou; Hsiao Kuan-chu; Lin Yin-yu; Liu Lin-chin; Liu Pei-hua; Yang Ming-ching	Pearlie Chan; Charmian Koo; Tang Tsz In; Joyce Tung; Flora Wong; Yeung Hoi Ning	Puja Batra; Bharati Dey; Kalpana Gurjar; Alka Kshirsagar; Vidhya Patel; Asha Sharma
Indonesia	Singapore	South Korea	Thailand
Fera Damayanti; Yunita Fytry; Elsya Saktia Ningtias; Riantini; Ernis Sefita; Rachma Shaumi	Leong Jia Min; Li Lan; Lim Jing Xuan; Low Siok Hui; Jazlene Ong; Selene Tan	Hong Pil-hae; Im Hyun; Kim Hyoung-ryun; Kim Jin-kyoung; Kim Yoon-kyung; Lee Choon-hee	Suthita Insrila; Saowalak Khongkaew; Phattharin Lawtrakulngam; Ann Malakul; Yawamon Phimpanyasook; Manthanee Yaisawang

== Results ==
=== Qualification ===
Rank	Team	Round							Pen.	Total
Rank	Team	1	2	3	4	5	6	7	Pen.	Total
1	China (CHN)	KOR; 20.00	TPE; 4.54	INA; 17.63	THA; 9.03	IND; 13.23	SGP; 14.85	HKG; 12.16		176.69
1	China (CHN)	KOR; 14.19	IND; 18.76	THA; 12.16	SGP; 1.35	INA; 12.44	TPE; 14.19	HKG; 12.16		176.69
2	Hong Kong (HKG)	TPE; 12.16	INA; 4.74	THA; 20.00	KOR; 16.72	SGP; 12.97	IND; 15.26	CHN; 7.84		159.08
2	Hong Kong (HKG)	IND; 16.55	THA; 12.44	SGP; 10.33	KOR; 9.03	TPE; 10.97	INA; 2.23	CHN; 7.84		159.08
3	Chinese Taipei (TPE)	HKG; 7.84	CHN; 15.46	IND; 20.00	SGP; 13.96	INA; 10.97	THA; 16.03	KOR; 5.15		156.41
3	Chinese Taipei (TPE)	THA; 12.97	SGP; 5.36	KOR; 19.38	IND; 3.79	HKG; 9.03	CHN; 5.81	INA; 10.66		156.41
4	Singapore (SGP)	INA; 4.94	THA; 10.33	KOR; 18.65	TPE; 6.04	HKG; 7.03	CHN; 5.15	IND; 9.67		153.58
4	Singapore (SGP)	INA; 9.34	TPE; 14.64	HKG; 9.67	CHN; 18.65	KOR; 20.00	IND; 12.44	THA; 7.03		153.58
5	Indonesia (INA)	SGP; 15.06	HKG; 15.26	CHN; 2.37	IND; 8.72	TPE; 9.03	KOR; 16.38	THA; 5.81		138.02
5	Indonesia (INA)	SGP; 10.66	KOR; 5.36	IND; 8.42	THA; 6.28	CHN; 7.56	HKG; 17.77	TPE; 9.34		138.02
6	Thailand (THA)	IND; 12.16	SGP; 9.67	HKG; 0.00	CHN; 10.97	KOR; 7.29	TPE; 3.97	INA; 14.19		126.38
6	Thailand (THA)	TPE; 7.03	HKG; 7.56	CHN; 7.84	INA; 13.72	IND; 6.04	KOR; 12.97	SGP; 12.97		126.38
7	India (IND)	THA; 7.84	KOR; 11.87	TPE; 0.00	INA; 11.28	CHN; 6.77	HKG; 4.74	SGP; 10.33		125.48
7	India (IND)	HKG; 3.45	CHN; 1.24	INA; 11.58	TPE; 16.21	THA; 13.96	SGP; 7.56	KOR; 18.65		125.48
8	South Korea (KOR)	CHN; 0.00	IND; 8.13	SGP; 1.35	HKG; 3.28	THA; 12.71	INA; 3.62	TPE; 14.85		84.36
8	South Korea (KOR)	CHN; 5.81	INA; 14.64	TPE; 0.62	HKG; 10.97	SGP; 0.00	THA; 7.03	IND; 1.35		84.36

=== Knockout round ===
Semifinals			Final
1	China	303.00
4	Singapore	133.10	1	China	213.00
2	Hong Kong	163.10	3	Chinese Taipei	212.10
3	Chinese Taipei	194.00

==== Semifinals ====
Team	Carry over	Segment						Pen.	Total
Team	Carry over	1	2	3	4	5	6	Pen.	Total
China (CHN)	0.00	43	34	45	76	58	47		303.00
Singapore (SGP)	8.10	25	17	0	31	31	21		133.10
Hong Kong (HKG)	5.10	47	19	47	13	14	18		163.10
Chinese Taipei (TPE)	0.00	18	28	24	34	50	40		194.00

==== Final ====
Team	Carry over	Segment						Pen.	Total
Team	Carry over	1	2	3	4	5	6	Pen.	Total
China (CHN)	0.00	23	43	31	27	51	38		213.00
Chinese Taipei (TPE)	2.10	47	42	30	33	23	35		212.10
