= Bridge at the 2022 Asian Games – Men's team =

Men's team at the 2022 Asian Games
- Venue: Hangzhou Chess Academy
- Dates: 27 September – 6 October 2023
- Competitors: 61 from 11 nations

Medalists
gold medal	Hong Kong; Chiu Wai Lap, Ho Hoi Tung, Ho Wai Lam, Lai Wai Kit, Mak Kwok Fai, Sze Shun Sum
silver medal	India; Ajay Khare, Sumit Mukherjee, Jaggy Shivdasani, Sandeep Thakral, Rajeshwar Tiwari, Raju Tolani
bronze medal	Japan; Kazuo Furuta, Hiroaki Miura, Masayuki Tanaka, Hiroki Yokoi
bronze medal	China; Hu Linlin, Ju Chuancheng, Liu Jing, Liu Yinghao, Zhuang Zejun

The contract bridge men's team competition at the 2022 Asian Games was held at Hangzhou Chess Academy, Hangzhou, China from 27 September to 6 October 2023.

== Schedule ==
All times are China Standard Time (UTC+08:00)

Date	Time	Event
Wednesday, 27 September 2023	09:00	Round robin 1–1
Wednesday, 27 September 2023	13:30	Round robin 1–2
Wednesday, 27 September 2023	16:00	Round robin 1–3
Wednesday, 27 September 2023	18:30	Round robin 1–4
Thursday, 28 September 2023	09:00	Round robin 1–5
Thursday, 28 September 2023	13:30	Round robin 1–6
Thursday, 28 September 2023	16:00	Round robin 1–7
Thursday, 28 September 2023	18:30	Round robin 1–8
Friday, 29 September 2023	09:00	Round robin 1–9
Friday, 29 September 2023	13:30	Round robin 1–10
Friday, 29 September 2023	16:00	Round robin 1–11
Saturday, 30 September 2023	09:00	Round robin 2–1
Saturday, 30 September 2023	13:30	Round robin 2–2
Saturday, 30 September 2023	16:00	Round robin 2–3
Saturday, 30 September 2023	18:30	Round robin 2–4
Sunday, 1 October 2023	09:00	Round robin 2–5
Sunday, 1 October 2023	13:30	Round robin 2–6
Sunday, 1 October 2023	16:00	Round robin 2–7
Sunday, 1 October 2023	18:30	Round robin 2–8
Monday, 2 October 2023	09:00	Round robin 2–9
Monday, 2 October 2023	13:30	Round robin 2–10
Monday, 2 October 2023	16:00	Round robin 2–11
Tuesday, 3 October 2023	09:00	Semifinals 1
Wednesday, 4 October 2023	09:00	Semifinals 2
Thursday, 5 October 2023	09:00	Final 1
Friday, 6 October 2023	09:00	Final 2

== Squads ==
Bangladesh	China	Chinese Taipei	Hong Kong
Asifur Rahman Chowdhury; Shah Ziaul Haque; Monirul Islam; A. H. M. Kamruzzaman; Moshiur Rahman	Hu Linlin; Ju Chuancheng; Liu Jing; Liu Yinghao; Zhuang Zejun	Chang Wei-ming; Chen Li-jen; Chou Che-min; Wang Kung-chieh; Wu Ming-hsuan; Yeh Cheng-hung	Chiu Wai Lap; Ho Hoi Tung; Ho Wai Lam; Lai Wai Kit; Mak Kwok Fai; Sze Shun Sum
India	Japan	Pakistan	Philippines
Ajay Khare; Sumit Mukherjee; Jaggy Shivdasani; Sandeep Thakral; Rajeshwar Tiwari; Raju Tolani	Kazuo Furuta; Hiroaki Miura; Masayuki Tanaka; Hiroki Yokoi	Ghalib Ali Bandesha; Muhammad Zia Hai; Masood Mazhar; Yousuf Jan Mohammad; Shahab Sarki	Kebong Catbagan; Homer De Vera; Andrew Falcon; Brian Refe; George Soo; Jaycee Urriquia
Singapore	South Korea	Thailand	
Lam Cheng Yen; Linus Lee; Teo Xue Heng; Timothy Wu; Yang Junyan; Zhang Yukun	Ahn Jai-yong; Chun Jae-min; Jang Jung-bae; Kim Dae-hong; Lee Han-sang; Lee Soo-ik	Chongchana Chantamas; Vatcharapol Jiamjitton; Terasak Jitngamkusol; Tanakorn Lavanakul; Sahasan Leevorawat; Taweesith Trimankha	

== Results ==
=== Qualification ===
Rank	Team	Round											Pen.	Total
Rank	Team	1	2	3	4	5	6	7	8	9	10	11	Pen.	Total
1	Hong Kong (HKG)	JPN; 8.72	PHI; 10.33	SGP; 6.77	BAN; 15.85	Bye; 12.00	KOR; 13.48	THA; 16.88	TPE; 18.65	CHN; 16.03	PAK; 18.87	IND; 4.74		308.31
1	Hong Kong (HKG)	PAK; 20.00	BAN; 20.00	THA; 16.03	KOR; 14.19	Bye; 12.00	PHI; 18.98	IND; 16.38	SGP; 17.63	TPE; 8.72	JPN; 17.91	CHN; 4.15		308.31
2	India (IND)	PHI; 18.04	SGP; 10.97	BAN; 10.66	Bye; 12.00	KOR; 16.03	JPN; 9.03	CHN; 9.67	THA; 18.17	PAK; 20.00	TPE; 15.26	HKG; 15.26		288.60
2	India (IND)	PHI; 18.65	PAK; 17.91	BAN; 6.77	THA; 7.56	KOR; 19.47	Bye; 12.00	HKG; 3.62	CHN; 11.28	SGP; 14.42	TPE; 12.16	JPN; 9.67		288.60
3	China (CHN)	SGP; 17.63	BAN; 6.52	Bye; 12.00	KOR; 5.58	JPN; 16.03	PHI; 13.48	IND; 10.33	PAK; 13.72	HKG; 3.97	THA; 9.34	TPE; 13.96		287.91
3	China (CHN)	BAN; 13.23	THA; 20.00	KOR; 19.18	Bye; 12.00	PHI; 7.56	PAK; 19.74	TPE; 19.08	IND; 8.72	JPN; 13.96	SGP; 16.03	HKG; 15.85		287.91
4	Japan (JPN)	HKG; 11.28	THA; 13.96	PAK; 20.00	TPE; 15.06	CHN; 3.97	IND; 10.97	KOR; 14.19	SGP; 17.49	BAN; 18.04	Bye; 12.00	PHI; 18.53		237.96
4	Japan (JPN)	Bye; 12.00	PHI; 8.42	PAK; 8.72	BAN; 13.72	THA; 16.03	KOR; 1.24	SGP; 0.09	TPE; 3.79	CHN; 6.04	HKG; 2.09	IND; 10.33		237.96
5	Singapore (SGP)	CHN; 2.37	IND; 9.03	HKG; 13.23	THA; 4.94	PAK; 4.15	TPE; 9.03	PHI; 19.38	JPN; 2.51	Bye; 12.00	KOR; 14.19	BAN; 18.17		231.50
5	Singapore (SGP)	KOR; 5.81	Bye; 12.00	PHI; 17.19	PAK; 17.63	BAN; 12.71	THA; 7.29	JPN; 19.91	HKG; 2.37	IND; 5.58	CHN; 3.97	TPE; 18.04		231.50
6	Chinese Taipei (TPE)	BAN; 14.64	Bye; 12.00	KOR; 13.96	JPN; 4.94	PHI; 14.19	SGP; 10.97	PAK; 18.87	HKG; 1.35	THA; 10.66	IND; 4.74	CHN; 6.04		231.13
6	Chinese Taipei (TPE)	THA; 6.52	KOR; 19.47	Bye; 12.00	PHI; 17.77	PAK; 18.76	BAN; 6.04	CHN; 0.92	JPN; 16.21	HKG; 11.28	IND; 7.84	SGP; 1.96		231.13
7	Thailand (THA)	KOR; 1.02	JPN; 6.04	PHI; 15.85	SGP; 15.06	BAN; 11.87	Bye; 12.00	HKG; 3.12	IND; 1.83	TPE; 9.34	CHN; 10.66	PAK; 13.48		210.67
7	Thailand (THA)	TPE; 13.48	CHN; 0.00	HKG; 3.97	IND; 12.44	JPN; 3.97	SGP; 12.71	BAN; 7.29	PAK; 14.64	Bye; 12.00	PHI; 12.71	KOR; 17.19		210.67
8	South Korea (KOR)	THA; 18.98	PAK; 7.56	TPE; 6.04	CHN; 14.42	IND; 3.97	HKG; 6.52	JPN; 5.81	BAN; 11.28	PHI; 16.03	SGP; 5.81	Bye; 12.00		201.31
8	South Korea (KOR)	SGP; 14.19	TPE; 0.53	CHN; 0.82	HKG; 5.81	IND; 0.53	JPN; 18.76	Bye; 12.00	PHI; 15.06	PAK; 13.96	BAN; 8.42	THA; 2.81		201.31
9	Bangladesh (BAN)	TPE; 5.36	CHN; 13.48	IND; 9.34	HKG; 4.15	THA; 8.13	PAK; 7.84	Bye; 12.00	KOR; 8.72	JPN; 1.96	PHI; 18.17	SGP; 1.83		199.74
9	Bangladesh (BAN)	CHN; 6.77	HKG; 0.00	IND; 13.23	JPN; 6.28	SGP; 7.29	TPE; 13.96	THA; 12.71	Bye; 12.00	PHI; 20.00	KOR; 11.58	PAK; 4.94		199.74
10	Pakistan (PAK)	Bye; 12.00	KOR; 12.44	JPN; 0.00	PHI; 4.94	SGP; 15.85	BAN; 12.16	TPE; 1.13	CHN; 6.28	IND; 0.00	HKG; 1.13	THA; 6.52	2.00	132.92
10	Pakistan (PAK)	HKG; 0.00	IND; 2.09	JPN; 11.28	SGP; 2.37	TPE; 1.24	CHN; 0.26	PHI; 6.77	THA; 5.36	KOR; 6.04	Bye; 12.00	BAN; 15.06	2.00	132.92
11	Philippines (PHI)	IND; 1.96	HKG; 9.67	THA; 4.15	PAK; 15.06	TPE; 5.81	CHN; 6.52	SGP; 0.62	Bye; 12.00	KOR; 3.97	BAN; 1.83	JPN; 1.47		131.95
11	Philippines (PHI)	IND; 1.35	JPN; 11.58	SGP; 2.81	TPE; 2.23	CHN; 12.44	HKG; 1.02	PAK; 13.23	KOR; 4.94	BAN; 0.00	THA; 7.29	Bye; 12.00		131.95

=== Knockout round ===
Semifinals			Final
1	Hong Kong	187.10
4	Japan	139.00	1	Hong Kong	229.10
2	India	180.60	2	India	152.00
3	China	170.00

==== Semifinals ====
Team	Carry over	Segment						Pen.	Total
Team	Carry over	1	2	3	4	5	6	Pen.	Total
Hong Kong (HKG)	16.10	41	7	34	29	26	34		187.10
Japan (JPN)	0.00	27	12	17	21	41	21		139.00
India (IND)	1.60	62	22	17	16	37	25		180.60
China (CHN)	0.00	22	22	31	36	24	35		170.00

==== Final ====
Team	Carry over	Segment						Pen.	Total
Team	Carry over	1	2	3	4	5	6	Pen.	Total
Hong Kong (HKG)	3.10	55	46	28	42	38	17		229.10
India (IND)	0.00	32	29	30	32	17	12		152.00
