= Bridge at the 2018 Asian Games – Men's team =

Men's team at the 2018 Asian Games
- Venue: Jakarta International Expo
- Dates: 21–27 August 2018
- Competitors: 78 from 14 nations

Medalists
gold medal	Singapore; Fong Kien Hoong, Loo Choon Chou, Desmond Oh, Kelvin Ong, Poon Hua, Zhang Yukun
silver medal	Hong Kong; Lai Wai Kit, Lau Pik Kin, Mak Kwok Fai, Ng Chi Cheung, Wan Siu Kau, Zen Wei Peu
bronze medal	India; Ajay Khare, Debabrata Majumder, Sumit Mukherjee, Jaggy Shivdasani, Rajeshwar Tiwari, Raju Tolani
bronze medal	China; Chen Gang, Ju Chuancheng, Shi Haojun, Shi Zhengjun, Yang Lixin, Zhuang Zejun

The contract bridge men's team competition at the 2018 Asian Games was held at the Jakarta International Expo, Jakarta, Indonesia from 21 to 27 August 2018.

== Schedule ==
All times are Western Indonesia Time (UTC+07:00)

Date	Time	Event
Tuesday, 21 August 2018	10:00	Round robin 1
Tuesday, 21 August 2018	14:00	Round robin 2
Tuesday, 21 August 2018	16:45	Round robin 3
Wednesday, 22 August 2018	10:00	Round robin 4
Wednesday, 22 August 2018	14:00	Round robin 5
Wednesday, 22 August 2018	16:45	Round robin 6
Thursday, 23 August 2018	10:00	Round robin 7
Thursday, 23 August 2018	14:00	Round robin 8
Thursday, 23 August 2018	16:45	Round robin 9
Friday, 24 August 2018	14:00	Round robin 10
Friday, 24 August 2018	16:45	Round robin 11
Saturday, 25 August 2018	10:00	Round robin 12
Saturday, 25 August 2018	14:00	Round robin 13
Sunday, 26 August 2018	09:30	Semifinals
Monday, 27 August 2018	10:00	Final

== Squads ==
Bangladesh	China	Chinese Taipei	Hong Kong
Sayeed Ahmed; Bani Amin; Dewan Mohammad Hanzala; Mohammed Salahuddin; Nurul Huda Shamsuzzaman	Chen Gang; Ju Chuancheng; Shi Haojun; Shi Zhengjun; Yang Lixin; Zhuang Zejun	Chen Li-jen; Lin Po-yi; Lin Ying-yi; Wu Tzu-lin	Lai Wai Kit; Lau Pik Kin; Mak Kwok Fai; Ng Chi Cheung; Wan Siu Kau; Zen Wei Peu
India	Indonesia	Japan	Jordan
Ajay Khare; Debabrata Majumder; Sumit Mukherjee; Jaggy Shivdasani; Rajeshwar Tiwari; Raju Tolani	Ronny Eltanto; Agus Kustrijanto; Henky Lasut; Freddy Eddy Manoppo; Santoso Sie; Youbert Jefry Sumarauw	Kazuo Furuta; Hiroshi Kaku; Masayuki Tanaka; Shugo Tanaka; Tadashi Teramoto; Hiroki Yokoi	Jawan Hallasa; Iskander Imasaih; Zafer Jarrar; Sakher Malkawi; Amr Agha Nimer; Fadi Sweidan
Malaysia	Pakistan	Philippines	Saudi Arabia
David Law; Tan Su Beng; Tan Sze Guan; Yau Ah Peng; Yeoh Li Yuan	Ghalib Ali Bandesha; Gulzar Ahmed Bilal; Asadullah Khan; Farrukh Liaqat; Assad Maqbool; Syed Nadir Ali Shah	Eleazar Cabanilla; Andrew Falcon; Joseph Maliwat; Alberto Quiogue; Romulo Virola; Kong Te Yang	Ibrahim Al-Ahdal; Omar Bajunaid; Abdelhakim Sahab; Hussamuddin Sallout
Singapore	Thailand		
Fong Kien Hoong; Loo Choon Chou; Desmond Oh; Kelvin Ong; Poon Hua; Zhang Yukun	Chongchana Chantamas; Wanchai Danwachira; Kasemsuk Koomtako; Kirawat Limsinsopon; Singsan Phromyothi; Vithaya Viriyamontchai		

== Results ==
=== Qualification round ===
Rank	Team	Round													Pen.	Total
Rank	Team	1	2	3	4	5	6	7	8	9	10	11	12	13	Pen.	Total
1	Singapore (SGP)	CHN; 9.39	JPN; 15.19	INA; 11.48	TPE; 15.56	PAK; 19.34	BAN; 15.74	THA; 13.97	PHI; 16.58	HKG; 12.55	JOR; 16.09	IND; 6.25	KSA; 18.09	MAS; 13.52	0.50	183.25
2	China (CHN)	SGP; 10.61	MAS; 7.71	JOR; 16.58	PHI; 12.29	KSA; 20.00	JPN; 14.39	BAN; 19.34	HKG; 12.29	IND; 3.74	INA; 3.42	PAK; 20.00	TPE; 15.19	THA; 17.03		172.59
3	Hong Kong (HKG)	INA; 10.00	TPE; 7.97	PAK; 15.92	IND; 16.73	THA; 19.43	KSA; 15.19	JPN; 13.52	CHN; 7.71	SGP; 7.45	PHI; 7.71	MAS; 18.55	JOR; 15.74	BAN; 10.61	0.50	166.03
4	India (IND)	JOR; 17.45	PHI; 6.72	KSA; 14.60	HKG; 3.27	BAN; 6.72	THA; 15.00	MAS; 19.43	INA; 4.26	CHN; 16.26	TPE; 14.80	SGP; 13.75	JPN; 16.88	PAK; 13.97	0.50	162.61
5	Chinese Taipei (TPE)	KSA; 18.97	HKG; 12.03	BAN; 13.28	SGP; 4.44	MAS; 17.59	INA; 7.97	PHI; 10.00	PAK; 17.45	THA; 20.00	IND; 5.20	JPN; 12.29	CHN; 4.81	JOR; 17.72	0.50	161.25
6	Indonesia (INA)	HKG; 10.00	BAN; 13.97	SGP; 8.52	MAS; 19.07	JOR; 11.76	TPE; 12.03	KSA; 15.38	IND; 15.74	PAK; 6.96	CHN; 16.58	THA; 10.00	PHI; 12.55	JPN; 4.81	1.00	156.37
7	Japan (JPN)	BAN; 10.61	SGP; 4.81	MAS; 18.44	JOR; 15.92	PHI; 19.16	CHN; 5.61	HKG; 6.48	THA; 14.18	KSA; 11.48	PAK; 19.25	TPE; 7.71	IND; 3.12	INA; 15.19	0.50	151.46
8	Philippines (PHI)	PAK; 2.03	IND; 13.28	THA; 12.29	CHN; 7.71	JPN; 0.84	JOR; 16.09	TPE; 10.00	SGP; 3.42	MAS; 8.52	HKG; 12.29	BAN; 18.87	INA; 7.45	KSA; 19.52	0.50	131.81
9	Thailand (THA)	MAS; 10.61	JOR; 13.75	PHI; 7.71	KSA; 19.52	HKG; 0.57	IND; 5.00	SGP; 6.03	JPN; 5.82	TPE; 0.00	BAN; 17.17	INA; 10.00	PAK; 14.80	CHN; 2.97	0.50	113.45
10	Pakistan (PAK)	PHI; 17.97	KSA; 16.88	HKG; 4.08	BAN; 13.75	SGP; 0.66	MAS; 16.88	JOR; 4.26	TPE; 2.55	INA; 13.04	JPN; 0.75	CHN; 0.00	THA; 5.20	IND; 6.03		102.05
11	Bangladesh (BAN)	JPN; 9.39	INA; 6.03	TPE; 6.72	PAK; 6.25	IND; 13.28	SGP; 4.26	CHN; 0.66	KSA; 11.20	JOR; 10.61	THA; 2.83	PHI; 1.13	MAS; 19.07	HKG; 9.39	2.50	98.32
12	Jordan (JOR)	IND; 2.55	THA; 6.25	CHN; 3.42	JPN; 4.08	INA; 8.24	PHI; 3.91	PAK; 15.74	MAS; 8.24	BAN; 9.39	SGP; 3.91	KSA; 5.40	HKG; 4.26	TPE; 2.28		77.67
13	Malaysia (MAS)	THA; 9.39	CHN; 12.29	JPN; 1.56	INA; 0.93	TPE; 2.41	PAK; 3.12	IND; 0.57	JOR; 11.76	PHI; 11.48	KSA; 11.48	HKG; 1.45	BAN; 0.93	SGP; 6.48		73.85
14	Saudi Arabia (KSA)	TPE; 1.03	PAK; 3.12	IND; 5.40	THA; 0.48	CHN; 0.00	HKG; 4.81	INA; 4.62	BAN; 8.80	JPN; 8.52	MAS; 8.52	JOR; 14.60	SGP; 1.91	PHI; 0.48	6.00	56.29

=== Knockout round ===
Semifinals			Final
1	Singapore	166.00
4	India	93.67	1	Singapore	107.00
2	China	103.67	3	Hong Kong	52.00
3	Hong Kong	127.00

==== Semifinals ====
Team	Carry over	Segment			Pen.	Total
Team	Carry over	1	2	3	Pen.	Total
Singapore (SGP)	0.00	64	61	41		166.00
India (IND)	4.67	21	41	27		93.67
China (CHN)	2.67	26	25	50		103.67
Hong Kong (HKG)	0.00	47	43	37		127.00

==== Final ====
Team	Carry over	Segment			Pen.	Total
Team	Carry over	1	2	3	Pen.	Total
Singapore (SGP)	3.00	32	38	34		107.00
Hong Kong (HKG)	0.00	26	9	17		52.00
