= Bridge at the 2018 Asian Games – Women's pair =

Women's pair at the 2018 Asian Games
- Venue: Jakarta International Expo
- Dates: 28 August – 1 September 2018
- Competitors: 40 from 7 nations

Medalists
gold medal	Ran Jingrong; Wu Shaohong	China
silver medal	Wu Yu-fang; Tsai Wen-chuan	Chinese Taipei
bronze medal	Yeung Hoi Ning; Pearlie Chan	Hong Kong
bronze medal	Huang Yan; Wang Nan	China

The Contract Bridge women's pair competition at the 2018 Asian Games was held at the Jakarta International Expo, Jakarta, Indonesia from 28 August to 1 September 2018.

== Schedule ==
All times are Western Indonesia Time (UTC+07:00)

Date	Time	Event
Tuesday, 28 August 2018	10:00	Qualification round 1
Tuesday, 28 August 2018	14:30	Qualification round 2
Wednesday, 29 August 2018	10:00	Qualification round 3
Wednesday, 29 August 2018	14:30	Qualification round 4
Thursday, 30 August 2018	10:00	Semifinals 1
Thursday, 30 August 2018	14:30	Semifinals 2
Friday, 31 August 2018	09:30	Semifinals 3
Friday, 31 August 2018	14:30	Finals 1
Saturday, 1 September 2018	10:00	Finals 2

== Results ==
=== Qualification round ===
Rank	Team	Session				Total
Rank	Team	1	2	3	4	Total
1	Charmian Koo / Flora Wong (HKG)	240.0	214.5	268.1	218.0	940.6
2	Tang Tsz In / Joyce Tung (HKG)	252.0	243.4	241.4	191.0	927.8
3	Hema Deora / Marianne Karmarkar (IND)	237.0	261.4	233.7	177.0	909.1
4	Huang Yan / Wang Nan (CHN)	271.0	251.6	222.3	164.0	908.9
5	Chen Yin-shou / Lin Yin-yu (TPE)	211.0	267.3	227.6	202.0	907.9
6	Ran Jingrong / Wu Shaohong (CHN)	212.0	281.1	231.7	183.0	907.8
7	Lu Yan / Liu Yan (CHN)	271.0	211.4	226.9	195.0	904.3
8	Yeung Hoi Ning / Pearlie Chan (HKG)	253.0	247.6	196.3	193.0	889.9
9	Rury Andhani / Conny Eufke Sumampouw (INA)	238.0	191.5	212.9	215.0	857.4
10	Fera Damayanti / Riantini (INA)	172.0	239.8	284.6	161.0	857.4
11	Tan Yoke Lan / Ng Lai Chun (SGP)	234.0	217.8	206.3	198.0	856.1
12	Liu Pei-hua / So Ho-yee (TPE)	231.0	225.4	225.7	171.0	853.1
13	Pobsook Kamolvej / Ann Malakul (THA)	222.0	230.6	217.1	181.0	850.7
14	Aparna Sain / Feroza Chothia (IND)	214.0	237.7	234.0	154.0	839.7
15	Nunung Tri Yulianti / Nettin Erinda (INA)	235.0	176.7	244.0	172.0	827.7
16	Wu Yu-fang / Tsai Wen-chuan (TPE)	229.0	215.8	213.7	141.0	799.5
17	Soh Siew Luie / Petrina Leo (SGP)	212.0	193.5	238.6	154.0	798.1
18	Vasanti Shah / Bharati Dey (IND)	223.0	174.4	210.3	178.0	785.7
19	Vallapa Svangsopakul / Pavinee Sitthicharoensawat (THA)	167.0	240.7	174.4	163.0	745.1
20	Lian Sui Sim / Leong Jia Min (SGP)	173.8	181.4	190.4	189.0	734.6

=== Semifinals ===
Rank	Team	Carry over	Session			Total
Rank	Team	Carry over	1	2	3	Total
1	Ran Jingrong / Wu Shaohong (CHN)	223.0	185.1	276.0	127.0	811.1
2	Huang Yan / Wang Nan (CHN)	223.0	209.9	256.0	96.0	784.9
3	Nunung Tri Yulianti / Nettin Erinda (INA)	203.0	197.9	280.0	97.0	777.9
4	Yeung Hoi Ning / Pearlie Chan (HKG)	219.0	189.9	256.0	111.0	775.9
5	Hema Deora / Marianne Karmarkar (IND)	223.0	182.1	258.0	107.0	770.1
6	Liu Pei-hua / So Ho-yee (TPE)	210.0	199.1	239.0	116.0	764.1
7	Rury Andhani / Conny Eufke Sumampouw (INA)	211.0	151.9	268.0	120.0	750.9
8	Tang Tsz In / Joyce Tung (HKG)	228.0	188.1	249.0	84.0	749.1
9	Wu Yu-fang / Tsai Wen-chuan (TPE)	196.0	193.9	249.0	110.0	748.9
10	Pobsook Kamolvej / Ann Malakul (THA)	209.0	197.1	229.0	111.0	746.1
11	Fera Damayanti / Riantini (INA)	211.0	160.1	246.0	112.0	729.1
12	Charmian Koo / Flora Wong (HKG)	231.0	171.9	226.0	92.0	720.9
13	Chen Yin-shou / Lin Yin-yu (TPE)	223.0	128.4	241.0	108.0	700.4
14	Lu Yan / Liu Yan (CHN)	222.0	155.9	207.0	115.0	699.9
15	Tan Yoke Lan / Ng Lai Chun (SGP)	210.0	171.6	194.0	92.0	667.6
16	Aparna Sain / Feroza Chothia (IND)	206.0	117.1	246.0	82.0	651.1

=== Finals ===
Rank	Team	Carry over	Session		Total
Rank	Team	Carry over	1	2	Total
1st place, gold medalist(s)	Ran Jingrong / Wu Shaohong (CHN)	85.0	184.0	139.7	408.7
2nd place, silver medalist(s)	Wu Yu-fang / Tsai Wen-chuan (TPE)	78.0	180.0	127.8	385.8
3rd place, bronze medalist(s)	Yeung Hoi Ning / Pearlie Chan (HKG)	81.0	160.0	142.8	383.8
3rd place, bronze medalist(s)	Huang Yan / Wang Nan (CHN)	82.0	160.0	136.2	378.2
5	Charmian Koo / Flora Wong (HKG)	76.0	168.0	122.8	366.8
6	Rury Andhani / Conny Eufke Sumampouw (INA)	79.0	131.0	140.2	350.2
7	Hema Deora / Marianne Karmarkar (IND)	81.0	150.0	118.0	349.0
8	Fera Damayanti / Riantini (INA)	76.0	141.0	129.2	346.2
9	Tang Tsz In / Joyce Tung (HKG)	78.0	114.0	133.8	325.8
10	Pobsook Kamolvej / Ann Malakul (THA)	78.0	128.0	116.0	322.0
11	Liu Pei-hua / So Ho-yee (TPE)	80.0	140.0	101.8	321.8
12	Nunung Tri Yulianti / Nettin Erinda (INA)	81.0	144.0	89.2	314.2
