= Kiran Nadar =

Indian art collector and philanthropist (born 1951)

- Born: 1951 (age 74–75)
- Occupations: Art collector; Philanthropist
- Spouse: Shiv Nadar
- Children: Roshni
- Website: knma.in

Kiran Shiv Nadar (born 1951) is an Indian art collector and philanthropist. Nadar is the wife of Shiv Nadar, the founder of HCL Technologies, She is a trustee of the Shiv Nadar Foundation and chairperson of the Kiran Nadar Museum of Art. She won a bronze medal representing India in the 2018 Asian Games in the Bridge Mixed team event. She was awarded the Padma Shri in 2024.

== Personal life ==
Nadar met her husband, Shiv Nadar, at an advertising agency where she worked. They have a daughter Roshni Nadar. Nadar is also one of the leading contract bridge players in India.

== Career ==
Nadar started her career in advertising as a communications and brands professional at MCM. Nadar then joined NIIT and helped shape the brand.

Currently, her roles include managing the SSN Trust, Public Health Foundation of India (PFHI), Rasaja Foundation and the Rajiv Gandhi Foundation to support young Muslim girls in their education in Uttar Pradesh.

== Contribution to Bridge ==
In an article in Forbes, she spoke about the multi-generational appeal of the game talking about octogenarian bridge players and a 13-year old World Champion Anshul Bhatt.

== Awards and accolades ==
In 2010, Kiran Nadar is acknowledged by Forbes Asian Magazine as a "hero of philanthropy" thanks to her launch of India's first private philanthropic museum.

Nadar is considered the maharani of the Indian art world thanks to her collection of 5,500 and more modern Southern Asian arts. She is an international council member of the Museum of Modern Art (MoMA) in New York and is also one of the top commonwealth bridge players in India. She is also a member of the "Formidable" and has brought back many laurels. Nadar also represented India in various international competitive bridge events and managed to earn the gold medal for India after 12 years. In February, she brought India gold from the 5th Commonwealth Nations Bridge Championship held at the Gold Coast, Australia.
