= India at the 2018 Asian Games =

- Flag of India
- IOC code: IND
- NOC: Indian Olympic Association
- Website: www.olympic.ind.in

in Jakarta and Palembang, Indonesia
- Competitors: 570 in 36 sports
- Flag bearers: Neeraj Chopra; Rani Rampal
- Officials: 183
- Medals Ranked 8th: Gold 16 Silver 23 Bronze 31 Total 70

Asian Games appearances (overview)
- 1951; 1954; 1958; 1962; 1966; 1970; 1974; 1978; 1982; 1986; 1990; 1994; 1998; 2002; 2006; 2010; 2014; 2018; 2022; 2026

India competed at the 2018 Asian Games in Jakarta and Palembang, Indonesia, from 18 August to 2 September. Neeraj Chopra was the flag bearer for the opening ceremony while Rani Rampal was named as the flag bearer for the closing ceremony.

India bettered its previous best medal haul achieved eight years earlier at the 2010 Asian Games in Guangzhou, China.

== Medalists ==
- India won a bronze medal in the men's team regu event in sepak takraw which was the country's first medal since the debut of the sport in the 1990 Asian Games.
- India won its first ever medal in table tennis in the Asian Games in the men's team event
- Rahi Sarnobat became the first Indian woman to win the gold medal in a shooting event of Asian Games when she won the Women's 25m pistol event.
- Vinesh Phogat won the gold medal in the women's freestyle 50 kg category and became the first Indian woman wrestler to win a gold medal at the Asian Games.
- India won its first individual medals in the women's singles event in badminton with P. V. Sindhu claiming silver and Saina Nehwal claiming bronze.
- Neeraj Chopra won the country's first javelin gold medal, setting a new national record in the process.
- Indian pair of Pranab Bardhan and Shibnath Sarkar won the gold medal in the inaugural edition of Contract bridge at the 2018 Asian Games – Men's pair in the Asian Games.
- Vikas Krishan Yadav became the first Indian boxer to win a medal in three successive Asian games when he won bronze in the men's 75kg category.
- Swapna Barman won the gold medal in women's Heptathlon which is India's first ever medal in heptathlon in the Asian Games.

=== Medals by sport ===
Medals by sport
Sport	Gold	Silver	Bronze	Total
Archery	0	2	0	2
Athletics	8	9	3	20
Badminton	0	1	1	2
Boxing	1	0	1	2
Bridge	1	0	2	3
Equestrian	0	2	0	2
Field hockey	0	1	1	2
Kabaddi	0	1	1	2
Kurash	0	1	1	2
Tennis	1	0	2	3
Rowing	1	0	2	3
Sailing	0	1	2	3
Sepak takraw	0	0	1	1
Shooting	2	4	3	9
Squash	0	1	4	5
Table tennis	0	0	2	2
Wrestling	2	0	1	3
Wushu	0	0	4	4
Total	16	23	31	70

=== Medals by day ===
Medals by day
Day	Date	Gold	Silver	Bronze	Total
1	19 August	1	0	1	2
2	20 August	1	2	0	3
3	21 August	1	1	3	5
4	22 August	1	0	4	5
5	23 August	0	1	2	3
6	24 August	2	1	4	7
7	25 August	1	0	3	4
8	26 August	0	5	2	7
9	27 August	1	3	2	6
10	28 August	2	5	2	9
11	29 August	2	1	1	4
12	30 August	2	1	2	5
13	31 August	0	2	4	6
14	1 September	2	1	1	4
	Total	16	23	31	70

=== Medals by gender ===
Medals by gender
Gender	Gold	Silver	Bronze	Total
Male	11	12	16	38
Female	4	12	12	28
Mixed/Open	1	0	3	4
Total	16	23	31	70

=== Medalists ===
Medal	Name	Sport	Event	Date
Gold	Bajrang Punia	Wrestling	Men's freestyle 65 kg	19 August
Gold	Vinesh Phogat	Wrestling	Women's freestyle 50 kg	20 August
Gold	Saurabh Chaudhary	Shooting	Men's 10 metre air pistol	21 August
Gold	Rahi Sarnobat	Shooting	Women's 25 metre pistol	22 August
Gold	Sawarn Singh; Dattu Baban Bhokanal; Om Prakash; Sukhmeet Singh	Rowing	Men's quadruple sculls	24 August
Gold	Rohan Bopanna; Divij Sharan	Lawn tennis	Men's doubles	24 August
Gold	Tajinderpal Singh Toor	Athletics	Men's shot put	25 August
Gold	Neeraj Chopra	Athletics	Men's javelin throw	27 August
Gold	Manjit Singh	Athletics	Men's 800 metres	28 August
Gold	Rajiv Arokia; Muhammed Anas; Hima Das; M. R. Poovamma	Athletics	Mixed 4 x 400 metres relay	28 August
Gold	Arpinder Singh	Athletics	Men's triple jump	29 August
Gold	Swapna Barman	Athletics	Women's heptathlon	29 August
Gold	Jinson Johnson	Athletics	Men's 1500 metres	30 August
Gold	M. R. Poovamma; Saritaben Gaikwad; Hima Das; V. K. Vismaya	Athletics	Women's 4 × 400 m relay	30 August
Gold	Amit Panghal	Boxing	Men's 49 kg	1 September
Gold	Pranab Bardhan; Shibhnath Sarkar	Bridge	Men's pair	1 September
Silver	Deepak Kumar	Shooting	Men's 10 metre air rifle	20 August
Silver	Lakshay Sheoran	Shooting	Men's trap	20 August
Silver	Sanjeev Rajput	Shooting	Men's 50 metre rifle three positions	21 August
Silver	Shardul Vihan	Shooting	Men's double trap	23 August
Silver	India women's national kabaddi team: Kavita Thakur; Priyanka Negi; Manpreet Kaur; Payel Chowdhary; Ritu Negi; Sonali Vishnu Shingate; Sayali Keripale; Randeeep Kaur Khera; Shalini Pathak; Sakshi Kumari; Usha Narsimhaiah; Madhu Malviya	Kabaddi	Women's tournament	24 August
Silver	Fouaad Mirza	Equestrian	Individual eventing	26 August
Silver	Fouaad Mirza; Rakesh Kumar; Ashish Malik; Jitender Singh	Equestrian	Team eventing	26 August
Silver	Hima Das	Athletics	Women's 400 metres	26 August
Silver	Muhammed Anas	Athletics	Men's 400 metres	26 August
Silver	Dutee Chand	Athletics	Women's 100 metres	26 August
Silver	Dharun Ayyasamy	Athletics	Men's 400 metres hurdles	27 August
Silver	Sudha Singh	Athletics	Women's 3000 metres steeplechase	27 August
Silver	Neena Varakil	Athletics	Women's long jump	27 August
Silver	Muskan Kirar; Madhumita Kumari; Jyothi Surekha Vennam	Archery	Women's team compound	28 August
Silver	Abhishek Verma; Rajat Chauhan; Aman Saini	Archery	Men's team compound	28 August
Silver	P. V. Sindhu	Badminton	Women's singles	28 August
Silver	Jinson Johnson	Athletics	Men's 800 metres	28 August
Silver	Pincky Balhara	Kurash	Women's 52 kg	28 August
Silver	Dutee Chand	Athletics	Women's 200 metres	29 August
Silver	Dharun Ayyasamy; Kunhu Mohammed; Rajiv Arokia; Muhammed Anas	Athletics	Men's 4 × 400 m relay	30 August
Silver	Shweta Shervegar; Varsha Gautham	Sailing	Women's 49er FX	31 August
Silver	India women's national field hockey team: Navjot Kaur; Gurjit Kaur; Deep Grace Ekka; Monika Malik; Reena Khokhar; Nikki Pradhan; Savita Punia; Rajani Etimarpu; Vandana Katariya; Deepika Thakur; Udita Duhan; Namita Toppo; Lalremsiami; Navneet Kaur; Sunita Lakra; Rani Rampal; Lilima Minz; Neha Goyal	Field hockey	Women's tournament	31 August
Silver	Dipika Pallikal; Joshna Chinappa; Tanvi Khanna; Sunayna Kuruvilla	Squash	Women's team	1 September
Bronze	Ravi Kumar; Apurvi Chandela	Shooting	10 metre air rifle mixed team	19 August
Bronze	Abhishek Verma	Shooting	Men's 10 metre air pistol	21 August
Bronze	India men's national sepak takraw team: Niken Khangembam; Jiteshor Gurumayum; Malemnganba Sorokhaibam; Seitaram Thokchom; Henary Wahengbam; Sanjeck Waikhom; Akash Yumnam; Harish Kumar; Lalit Kumar; Jotin Ngathem; Dheeraj; Sandeep Kumar	Sepak takraw	Men's team regu	21 August
Bronze	Divya Kakran	Wrestling	Women's freestyle 68 kg	21 August
Bronze	Naorem Roshibina Devi	Wushu	Women's sanda 60 kg	22 August
Bronze	Santhosh Kumar	Wushu	Men's sanda 56 kg	22 August
Bronze	Surya Bhanu Pratap Singh	Wushu	Men's sanda 60 kg	22 August
Bronze	Narender Grewal	Wushu	Men's sanda 65 kg	22 August
Bronze	Ankita Raina	Lawn tennis	Women's singles	23 August
Bronze	India men's national kabaddi team: Girish Ernak; Deepak Niwas Hooda; Mohit Chillar; Sandeep Narwal; Pardeep Narwal; Rishank Devadiga; Monu Goyat; Ajay Thakur; Rohit Kumar; Rajulal Chaudhary; Mallesh Gangadhari; Rahul Chaudhari	Kabaddi	Men's tournament	23 August
Bronze	Dushyant Chauhan	Rowing	Men's lightweight single sculls	24 August
Bronze	Rohit Kumar; Bhagwan Singh	Rowing	Men's lightweight double sculls	24 August
Bronze	Heena Sidhu	Shooting	Women's 10 metre air pistol	24 August
Bronze	Prajnesh Gunneswaran	Lawn tennis	Men's singles	24 August
Bronze	Dipika Pallikal	Squash	Women's singles	25 August
Bronze	Joshna Chinappa	Squash	Women's singles	25 August
Bronze	Saurav Ghosal	Squash	Men's singles	25 August
Bronze	Sumit Mukherjee; Debabrata Majumder; Jaggy Shivdasani; Rajeshwar Tewari; Ajay Khare; Raju Tolani	Bridge	Men's team	26 August
Bronze	Bachiraju Satyanarayana; Rajeev Khandelwal; Gopinath Manna; Himani Khandelwal; Hema Deora; Kiran Nadar	Bridge	Mixed team	26 August
Bronze	Saina Nehwal	Badminton	Women's singles	27 August
Bronze	Sathiyan Gnanasekaran; Sharath Kamal; Anthony Amalraj; Harmeet Desai; Manav Thakkar	Table tennis	Men's team	28 August
Bronze	Malaprabha Jadhav	Kurash	Women's 52 kg	28 August
Bronze	Sharath Kamal; Manika Batra	Table tennis	Mixed doubles	29 August
Bronze	P. U. Chitra	Athletics	Women's 1500 metres	30 August
Bronze	Seema Punia	Athletics	Women's discus throw	30 August
Bronze	Harshita Tomar	Sailing	Laser 4.7	31 August
Bronze	Anu Raghavan	Athletics	Women's 400 metres hurdles	27 August
Bronze	Varun Thakkar; Ganapathy Chengappa	Sailing	Men's 49er	31 August
Bronze	Saurav Ghosal; Harinder Pal Sandhu; Ramit Tandon; Mahesh Mangaonkar	Squash	Men's team	31 August
Bronze	Vikas Krishan Yadav	Boxing	Men's 75 kg	31 August
Bronze	India men's national field hockey team: Harmanpreet Singh; Dilpreet Singh; Rupinder Pal Singh; Surender Kumar; Manpreet Singh; Sardara Singh; Simranjeet Singh; Mandeep Singh; Lalit Upadhyay; P. R. Sreejesh; Krishan Pathak; Varun Kumar; S. V. Sunil; Birendra Lakra; Akashdeep Singh; Chinglensana Singh; Amit Rohidas; Vivek Prasad	Field hockey	Men's tournament	1 September

== Competitors ==
The following is a list of the number of competitors representing India in each sport at the Games:

Sport	Men	Women	Total
Aquatics – Swimming	10	0	10
Aquatics – Diving	2	0	2
Archery	8	8	16
Athletics	22	28	50
Badminton	10	10	20
Basketball	0	12	12
Boxing	7	3	10
Bowling	6	0	6
Bridge	15	9	24
Canoeing – Slalom	0	2	2
Canoeing – Sprint	8	7	15
Canoeing – Traditional boat race	16	15	31
Cycling	8	7	15
Equestrian	7	0	7
Fencing	0	4	4
Golf	4	3	7
Gymnastics – Artistic	5	5	10
Handball	16	14	30
Field hockey	18	18	36
Judo	3	3	6
Kabaddi	12	12	24
Karate	2	0	2
Martial arts – Kurash	8	6	14
Martial arts – Pencak silat	1	2	3
Martial arts – Wushu	10	3	13
Roller sports – Roller skating	2	2	4
Rowing	27	7	34
Sailing	4	5	9
Sepak takraw	12	12	24
Shooting	16	12	28
Sport climbing	2	1	3
Squash	4	4	8
Table tennis	5	5	10
Taekwondo	2	6	8
Tennis – Lawn tennis	6	6	12
Tennis – Soft tennis	5	5	10
Volleyball	14	14	28
Weightlifting	3	1	4
Wrestling	12	6	18
Total	312	258	570

== Aquatics – Diving ==
Men

The Swimming Federation of India (SFI) announced the Diving team for the Games as follows:

Athlete	Event	Preliminaries		Final	
Athlete	Event	Points	Rank	Points	Rank
K Ramanand Sharma; Siddharth Pardeshi	3 m synchronized springboard	—N/a		322.14	6
K Ramanand Sharma	1 m springboard	327.40	7 Q	345.40	6
K Ramanand Sharma	3 m springboard	346.15	9 Q	325.45	12
Siddharth Pardesi	10 m platform	376.20	9 Q	375.30	9

== Aquatics – Swimming ==
Men

The Swimming Federation of India (SFI) selected a 10-member swimming squad as follows for the Asian Games:

Athlete	Event	Heats		Final	
Athlete	Event	Time	Rank	Time	Rank
Anshul Kothari	50 m butterfly	25.45	28	Did not advance	
Virdhawal Khade	50 m butterfly	24.09	5 Q NR	24.48	8
Avinash Mani	100 m butterfly	56.98	26	Did not advance	
Sajan Prakash	100 m butterfly	54.06	12	Did not advance	
Sajan Prakash	200 m butterfly	1:58.12	3 Q	1:57.75	5
Anshul Kothari	50 m freestyle	23.83	28	Did not advance	
Virdhawal Khade	50 m freestyle	22.43	3 Q NR	22.47	4
Virdhawal Khade	100 m freestyle	59.11	43	Did not advance	
Aaron D'Souza	100 m freestyle	51.50	27	Did not advance	
Saurabh Sangvekar	200 m freestyle	1:54.87	24	Did not advance	
Advait Page	800 m freestyle	—N/a		8:09.13	8
Advait Page	1500 m freestyle	—N/a		15:29.96	7
Sandeep Sejwal	50 m breaststroke	27.95	6 Q	27.98	7
Sandeep Sejwal	100 m breaststroke	1:02.07	10	did not advance	
Arvind Mani	50 m backstroke	26.89	21	did not advance	
Srihari Nataraj	50 m backstroke	26.19	10	did not advance	
Arvind Mani	100 m backstroke	58.09	16	Did not advance	
Srihari Nataraj	100 m backstroke	55.86	8 Q	56.19	7
Srihari Nataraj	200 m backstroke	2:02.97	7 Q	2:02.83	6 NR
Advait Page	200 m backstroke	2:06.85	12	Did not advance	
Neel Roy	200 m individual medley	2:08.07	14	Did not advance	
Virdhawal Khade; Sajan Prakash; Aaron D'Souza; Anshul Kothari	4 × 100 m freestyle relay	3:25.17	8 Q	3:25.34	8
Srihari Nataraj; Saurabh Sangvekar; Avinash Mani; Neel Roy	4 × 200 m freestyle relay	7:34.69	7 Q	7:37.07	7
Srihari Nataraj; Sandeep Sejwal; Sajan Prakash; Aaron D'Souza	4 × 100 m medley relay	3:44.94	9	did not advance	

== Archery ==
Recurve (Note: Only a maximum of 2 athletes from each NOC can enter the Individual Elimination Round.)

Individual

Athlete	Event	Ranking Round		Round of 64	Round of 32	Round of 16	Quarterfinals	Semifinals	Final / BM	
Athlete	Event	Score	Seed	Opposition Score	Opposition Score	Opposition Score	Opposition Score	Opposition Score	Opposition Score	Rank
Atanu Das	Men's individual	660	14	Bye	Pak Y-w (PRK); W 7–3	Gankin (KAZ); W 7–3	Agatha (INA); L 3–7	Did not advance		
Jagdish Chaudhary	Men's individual	638	39	did not advance						
Sukhchain Singh	Men's individual	631	46	did not advance						
Vishwas	Men's individual	658	17	Bye	Bataa (MGL); W 6–2	Abdullin (KAZ); L 1–7	did not advance			
Promila Daimary	Women's individual	642	21	Bye	Urantungalag (MGL); L 2–6	did not advance				
Deepika Kumari	Women's individual	649	17	Bye	Ri J-h (PRK); W 6–2	Le C-y (TPE); L 3–7	did not advance			
Ankita Bhakat	Women's individual	617	36	did not advance						
Laxmirani Majhi	Women's individual	608	44	did not advance						

Team Event

Athlete	Event	Ranking Round		Round of 32	Round of 16	Quarterfinals	Semifinals	Final / BM	
Athlete	Event	Score	Seed	Opposition Score	Opposition Score	Opposition Score	Opposition Score	Opposition Score	Rank
Jagdish Chaudhary; Atanu Das; Vishwas	Men's team	1956	8	Bye	Vietnam (VIE); W 5–3	South Korea (KOR); L 1–5	did not advance		
Ankita Bhakat; Promila Daimary; Deepika Kumari	Women's team	1908	7	—N/a	Mongolia (MGL); W 5–3	Chinese Taipei (TPE); L 2–6	did not advance		
Deepika Kumari; Atanu Das	Mixed team	1309	8	—N/a	Mongolia (MGL); L 4–5	did not advance			

Compound (Note: There was no individual event for the Compound event, the ranking round was only used for deciding the competitors for the team events. The top 3 male and female athletes in the ranking round competed for the men and women team elimination event. The top male and female athlete competed in the mixed event.)

Ranking Round

Athlete	Event	Ranking Round	
Athlete	Event	Score	Rank
Abhishek Verma	Men's team	704	4
Rajat Chauhan	Men's team	691	18
Sangamprit Bisla	Men's team	689	19
Aman Saini	Men's team	692	16
Jyothi Surekha Vennam	Women's team	705	2
Muskan Kirar	Women's team	691	9
Madhumita Kumari	Women's team	689	11
Trisha Deb	Women's team	683	19

Elimination Round

Athlete	Event	Ranking Round		Round of 32	Round of 16	Quarterfinals	Semifinals	Final / BM	
Athlete	Event	Score	Seed	Opposition Score	Opposition Score	Opposition Score	Opposition Score	Opposition Score	Rank
Abhishek Verma; Rajat Chauhan; Aman Saini	Men's team	2087	2	—N/a	Qatar (QAT); W 227–213	Philippines (PHI); W 227–226	Chinese Taipei (TPE); W 231–227	South Korea (KOR); L 229–229 (29–29 S-off) (17–20 no. of 10s)	2nd place, silver medalist(s)
Muskan Kirar; Madhumita Kumari; Jyothi Surekha Vennam	Women's team	2085	2	—N/a	Bye	Indonesia (INA); W 229–224	Chinese Taipei (TPE); W 225–222	South Korea (KOR); L 228–231	2nd place, silver medalist(s)
Abhishek Verma; Jyothi Surekha Vennam	Mixed team	1409	2	Bye	Iraq (IRQ); W 155–147	Iran (IRI); L 153–155	did not advance		

== Athletics ==
Men

Track & road events

Athletes	Event	Heats		Semifinal		Final	
Athletes	Event	Result	Rank	Result	Rank	Result	Rank
Rajiv Arokia	400 m	46.82	8 Q	46.08	6 Q	45.84	4
Muhammed Anas	400 m	45.63	1 Q	45.30	1 Q	45.69	2nd place, silver medalist(s)
Jinson Johnson	800 m	1:47.39	1 Q	—N/a		1.46.35	2nd place, silver medalist(s)
Manjit Singh	800 m	1.48.64	8 Q	—N/a		1.46.15	1st place, gold medalist(s)
Jinson Johnson	1500 m	3:46.50	2 Q	—N/a		3:44.72	1st place, gold medalist(s)
Manjit Singh	1500 m	3:50.59	7 Q	—N/a		3:46.57	4
Govindan Lakshmanan	5000 m	—N/a				14:17.09	6
Govindan Lakshmanan	10000 m	—N/a				DSQ	
Shankarlal Swami	3000m steeplechase	—N/a				8:43.43	8
Dharun Ayyasamy	400m hurdles	—N/a		49.55	2 Q	48.96 NR	2nd place, silver medalist(s)
Santosh Kumar	400m hurdles	—N/a		50.46	5 Q	49.66	5
Dharun Ayyasamy; Kunhu Mohammed; Rajiv Arokia; Muhammed Anas	4 × 400 m relay	3:06.48	4 Q	—N/a		3:01.85	2nd place, silver medalist(s)
Manish Singh Rawat	20 km walk	—N/a				DSQ	
Irfan Kolothum Thodi	20 km walk	—N/a				DSQ	
Sandeep Kumar	50 km walk	—N/a				DSQ	

Field events

Athletes	Event	Qualification		Final	
Athletes	Event	Result	Rank	Result	Rank
Shivpal Singh	Javelin throw	—N/a		74.11	8
Neeraj Chopra	Javelin throw	—N/a		88.06 NR	1st place, gold medalist(s)
Chethan Balasubramanya	High jump	2.15	5 Q	2.20	8
Murali Sreeshankar	Long jump	7.83	4 Q	7.95	6
Arpinder Singh	Triple jump	—N/a		16.77	1st place, gold medalist(s)
Rakesh Babu A V	Triple jump	—N/a		16.40	6
Tejinder Toor	Shot put	—N/a		20.75 GR	1st place, gold medalist(s)

Women

Track & road events

Athletes	Event	Heats		Semifinal		Final	
Athletes	Event	Result	Rank	Result	Rank	Result	Rank
Dutee Chand	100 m	11.38	3 Q	11.43	5 Q	11.32	2nd place, silver medalist(s)
Dutee Chand	200 m	23.37	2 Q	23.00	1 Q	23.20	2nd place, silver medalist(s)
Hima Das	200 m	23.47	7 Q	DSQ		Did not advance	
Hima Das	400 m	51.00	2 Q	—N/a		50.79 NR	2nd place, silver medalist(s)
Nirmala Sheoran	400 m	54.09	4 Q	—N/a		52.96	4
PU Chitra	1500 m	—N/a				4:12.56	3rd place, bronze medalist(s)
Monika Chaudhary	1500 m	—N/a				DNS	
Suriya Loganathan	5000 m	—N/a				15:49.30	5
Sanjivani Jadhav	5000 m	—N/a				15:52.96	7
Sanjivani Jadhav	10000 m	—N/a				33:13.06	9
Suriya Loganathan	10000 m	—N/a				32:42.08	6
Sudha Singh	3000m steeplechase	—N/a				9.40.03	2nd place, silver medalist(s)
Chinta Yadav	3000m steeplechase	—N/a				10:26.21	11
Jauna Murmu	400m hurdles	59.20	8 Q	—N/a		57.48	4
Anu Raghavan	400m hurdles	56.77	3 Q	—N/a		56.92	3rd place, bronze medalist(s)
M. R. Poovamma; Saritaben Gaikwad; Hima Das; V. K. Vismaya	4 × 400 m relay	—N/a				3:28.72	1st place, gold medalist(s)
B.Soumya	20 km walk	—N/a				DSQ	
Khushbir Kaur	20 km walk	—N/a				1:35.24	4

Field events

Athletes	Event	Final	
Athletes	Event	Result	Rank
Sarita Singh	Hammer throw	62.03	5
Sandeep Kumari	Discus throw	54.61	5
Seema Punia	Discus throw	62.26	3rd place, bronze medalist(s)
Annu Rani	Javelin throw	53.93	6
Nayana James	Long jump	6.14	10
Neena Varakil	Long jump	6.51	2nd place, silver medalist(s)

Combined events – Heptathlon

Athlete	Event	100H	HJ	SP	200 m	LJ	JT	800 m	Total	Rank
Purnima Hembram	Result	13.85	1.73	12.24	25.34	5.85	45.48	2:19.09	5837	4
Purnima Hembram	Points	1000	891	677	856	804	773	836	5837	4
Swapna Barman	Result	13.98	1.82	12.69	26.08	6.05	50.63	2:21.13	6026	1st place, gold medalist(s)
Swapna Barman	Points	981	1003	707	790	865	872	808	6026	1st place, gold medalist(s)

Mixed

Athlete	Event	Time	Rank
Rajiv Arokia; Muhammed Anas; Hima Das; M. R. Poovamma	4 × 400 m relay	3:15.71	1st place, gold medalist(s)

== Badminton ==
The Badminton Association of India (BAI) announced a 20-member squad for the Asian Games.

Singles

Athlete	Event	Round of 64	Round of 32	Round of 16	Quarterfinals	Semifinals	Final / BM	
Athlete	Event	Opposition Score	Opposition Score	Opposition Score	Opposition Score	Opposition Score	Opposition Score	Rank
Srikanth Kidambi	Men's singles	Bye	Wong W K (HKG); L (21–23, 19–21)	did not advance				
Prannoy Kumar	Men's singles	Bye	Wangcharoen (THA); L (12–21, 21–15, 15–21)	Did not advance				
P. V. Sindhu	Women's singles	—N/a	Vũ T T (VIE); W (21–10, 12–21, 23–21)	Tunjung (INA); W (21–12, 21–15)	Jindapol (THA); W (21–11, 16–21, 21–14)	Yamaguchi (JPN); W (21–17, 15–21, 21–10)	Tai T-y (TPE); L (13–21, 16–21)	2nd place, silver medalist(s)
Saina Nehwal	Women's singles	—N/a	Aghaei (IRI); W (21–7, 21–9)	Fitriani (INA); W (21–6, 21–14)	Intanon (THA); W (21–18, 21–16)	Tai T-y (TPE); L (17–21, 14–21)	Did not advance	3rd place, bronze medalist(s)

Doubles

Athlete	Event	Round of 32	Round of 16	Quarterfinals	Semifinals	Final / BM	
Athlete	Event	Opposition Score	Opposition Score	Opposition Score	Opposition Score	Opposition Score	Rank
Satwiksairaj Rankireddy; Chirag Shetty	Men's doubles	Tam C H / Chung (HKG); W (21–12, 21–14)	Choi S-g / Kang M-h (KOR); L (17–21, 21–19,17–21)	did not advance			
Manu Attri; B. Sumeeth Reddy	Men's doubles	Rasheed / Thoif (MDV); W (21–10, 21–8)	Li Jh / Liu Yc (CHN); L (13–21, 21–17, 23–25)	did not advance			
Ashwini Ponnappa; N. Sikki Reddy	Women's doubles	Yeung N T / Ng W Y (HKG); W (21–16, 21–15)	Chow M K / Lee M Y (MAS); W (21–17, 16–21, 21–19)	Chen Qc / Jia Yf (CHN); L (11–21, 22–24)	did not advance		
Rutaparna Panda; Arathi Sara Sunil	Women's doubles	Chaladchalam / Muenwong (THA); L (11–21, 6–21)	did not advance				
Pranav Chopra; N. Sikki Reddy	Mixed doubles	Chan P S / Goh L Y (MAS); L (15–21, 21–23)	Did not advance				
Satwiksairaj Rankireddy; Ashwini Ponnappa	Mixed doubles	Puavaranukroh / Taerattanachai (THA); L (25–27, 16–21)	Did not advance				

Team

Athlete	Event	Round of 16	Quarterfinals	Semifinals	Final / BM	
Athlete	Event	Opposition Score	Opposition Score	Opposition Score	Opposition Score	Rank
Srikanth Kidambi; Prannoy Kumar; B. Sai Praneeth; Sameer Verma; Satwiksairaj Rankireddy; Chirag Shetty; B. Sumeeth Reddy; Manu Attri; Pranav Chopra; Sourabh Verma	Men's team	Maldives (MDV); W 3–0	Indonesia (INA); L 1–3	did not advance		
P. V. Sindhu; Saina Nehwal; Sai Uttejitha Rao; Ashmita Chaliha; Aakarshi Kashyap; Gayathri Gopichand; Ashwini Ponnappa; N. Sikki Reddy; Rutaparna Panda; Arathi Sara Sunil	Women's team	Bye	Japan (JPN); L 1–3	did not advance		

== Basketball ==
Summary

Team	Event	Group stage					Quarterfinal	Semifinals / Pl.	Final / BM / Pl.	
Team	Event	Opposition Score	Opposition Score	Opposition Score	Opposition Score	Rank	Opposition Score	Opposition Score	Opposition Score	Rank
India women's	Women's tournament	Kazakhstan (KAZ); L 61–79	Chinese Taipei (TPE); L 61–84	Korea (COR); L 54–104	Indonesia (INA); L 66–69	5	did not advance			9

5x5 basketball

India women's team drawn in group X at the Games.

Women's tournament

Roster

The following is the India roster in the women's basketball tournament of the 2018 Asian Games.

India women's national basketball team – 2018 Asian Games roster
Players
Coaches

Pos.	No.	Name	Age – Date of birth	Height	Club	Ctr.
F	4	Anjana Prasannan	23 – 9 November 1994	1.77 m (5 ft 10 in)	Kerala	(India)
G	5	Sangeeta Kaur	22 – 15 April 1996	1.65 m (5 ft 5 in)	Chhattisgarh	(India)
C	6	Stephy Nixon	26 – 6 June 1992	1.81 m (5 ft 11 in)	Kerala	(India)
G	7	Bhandavya Hemmige	20 – 18 April 1998	1.66 m (5 ft 5 in)	Railways	(India)
F	8	Pushpa Senthil Kumar	16 – 18 September 2001	1.77 m (5 ft 10 in)	Tamil Nadu	(India)
G	9	Raspreet Sidhu	29 – 18 July 1989	1.68 m (5 ft 6 in)	Delhi	(India)
G	10	Madhu Kumari	23 – 9 July 1995	1.65 m (5 ft 5 in)	Railways	(India)
F	11	Priyanka Prabhakara	19 – 3 October 1998	1.72 m (5 ft 8 in)	Karnataka	(India)
C	12	Rajapriyadharshini Rajaganapathi	24 – 3 January 1994	1.85 m (6 ft 1 in)	Railways	(India)
F	13	Jeena Palanilkumkalayil Skaria	24 – 9 January 1994	1.79 m (5 ft 10 in)	Kerala	(India)
F	14	Shireen Limaye	23 – 13 February 1995	1.78 m (5 ft 10 in)	Maharashtra	(India)
G	15	Nisha Sharma	21 – 12 December 1996	1.67 m (5 ft 6 in)	Rajasthan	(India)

Head coach

- (India) Shiba Maggon

Legend

- (C) Team captain
- Club – describes last
  club before the tournament
- Age – describes age
  on 15 August 2018

Group X

Pos	Team	Pld	W	L	PF	PA	PD	Pts	Qualification
1	Chinese Taipei	4	4	0	358	239	+119	8	Quarterfinals
2	Korea	4	3	1	382	238	+144	7	Quarterfinals
3	Kazakhstan	4	2	2	263	291	−28	6	Quarterfinals
4	Indonesia	4	1	3	233	374	−141	5	Quarterfinals
5	India	4	0	4	242	336	−94	4	

Source: OCA

17 August
16:00

India	61–79	Kazakhstan
Scoring by quarter: 13–18, 12–19, 21–22, 15–20
Pts: Jeena 15; Rebs: Anjana 10; Asts: Anjana 10		Pts: Yagodkina 21; Rebs: Kondrakova 11; Asts: Yagodkina, Kolesnikova 6

Gelora Bung Karno Basketball Hall, Jakarta
Referees: Yuen Chun Yip (HKG), Cui Zhexiong (CHN), Jun Horiuchi (JPN)

19 August
10:00

Chinese Taipei	84–61	India
Scoring by quarter: 18–17, 15–11, 31–17, 20–16
Pts: Peng 14; Rebs: Huang L. 6 Asts: Lin 7		Pts: Jeena 13; Rebs: Limaye 7 Asts: Limaye 6

Gelora Bung Karno Basketball Hall, Jakarta
Referees: Mohammad Doust (IRI), Preeda Muongmee (THA), Anan Daraghma (PLE)

20 August
10:00

Korea	104–54	India
Scoring by quarter: 22–12, 27–10, 25–17, 30–15
Pts: Kang 17; Rebs: Park J.H. 7 Asts: Jang 8		Pts: Kumari 14; Rebs: Jeena 10; Asts: Jeena 6

Gelora Bung Karno Basketball Hall, Jakarta
Referees: Hadi Salem (IRI), Jun Horiuchi (JPN), Watcharin Padungratchadakit (THA)

23 August
18:30

India	66–69	Indonesia
Scoring by quarter: 14–17, 15–14, 21–21, 16–17
Pts: Nixon 18; Rebs: Jeena 17; Asts: Limaye 8		Pts: Christaline 21; Rebs: Gabriel 12; Asts: Tjundawan 6

Gelora Bung Karno Basketball Hall, Jakarta
Referees: Watcharin Padungratchadakit (THA), Jun Horiuchi (JPN), Cui Zhexiong (CHN)

== Boxing ==
- India's boxing campaign was pretty disappointing, as they failed to win a single medal in Women's boxing for the first time.
- But in men's category they bettered the previous game's tally.

Indian boxer Amit Panghal defeated reigning Olympic champion & World Championship silver medalist Hasanboy Dusmatov to clinch the gold medal in Boxing at the 2018 Asian Games – Men's 49 kg

Boxer Vikas Krishnan become the first Indian boxer to win medals in three successive editions of the Boxing at the Asian Games

Men

Athlete	Event	Round of 32	Round of 16	Quarterfinals	Semifinals	Final	Rank
Athlete	Event	Opposition Result	Opposition Result	Opposition Result	Opposition Result	Opposition Result	Rank
Amit Panghal	49 kg	Bye	Kharkhuu (MGL); W 5–0	Kim J-r (PRK); W 5–0	Paalam (PHI); W 3–2	Dusmatov (UZB); W 3–2	1st place, gold medalist(s)
Gaurav Solanki	52 kg	Tanaka (JPN); L 0–5	did not advance				
Mohammad Hussamuddin	56 kg	Bye	Enkh-Amar (MGL); L 2–3	did not advance			
Shiva Thapa	60 kg	Bye	Shan J (CHN); L RSC	did not advance			
Dheeraj Rangi	64 kg	Bye	Kobashev (KGZ); W 3–0	Chinzorig (MGL); L 0–5	Did not advance		
Manoj Kumar	69 kg	Wangdi (BHU); W 5–0	Abdurakhmanov (KGZ); L 0–5	Did not advance			
Vikas Krishan Yadav	75 kg	Bye	Ahmed (PAK); W 5–0	Tanglatihan (CHN); W 3–2	Amankul (KAZ); L MU	Did not advance	3rd place, bronze medalist(s)

Women

Athlete	Event	Round of 32	Round of 16	Quarterfinals	Semifinals	Final	Rank
Athlete	Event	Opposition Result	Opposition Result	Opposition Result	Opposition Result	Opposition Result	Rank
Sarjubala Devi	51 kg	Bye	Ghaforova (TJK); W 5–0	Chang Ya (CHN); L 0–5	did not advance		
Sonia Lather	57 kg	—N/a	Bye	Jo S-h (PRK); L 0–5	Did not advance		
Pavitra	60 kg	—N/a	Perveen (PAK); W RSC	Hasanah (INA); L 2–3	Did not advance		

== Bowling ==
Men

Athlete(s)	Event	Block 1 Score	Block 2 Score	Total	Rank
Dhruv Sarda; Shabbir Dhankot; Akaash Ashok Kumar	Trios	1887	1833	3720	27
Parvez Ahmed Saud; Ramachandraiah Kishan; Shoumick Datta	Trios	2015	1882	3897	21
Dhruv Sarda; Shabbir Dhankot; Aakaash Ashok Kumar; Parvez Ahmed Saud; Kishan Ramachandriah; Shoumick Datta	Team of 6	3876	3782	7658	13

== Bridge ==
The Bridge Federation of India picked a 24-member squad along with six reserves for the Asian Games.

Pairs

Athlete	Event	Qualification Round						Semifinals					Finals			
Athlete	Event	1	2	3	4	Total	Rank	1	2	3	Total	Rank	1	2	Total	Rank
Sumit Mukherjee; Debabrata Majumder	Men's pair	363.00	432.00	446.00	381.1	1622.10	7 Q	614.00	352.00	142.20	1108.20	4 Q	214.00	119.00	333.00	9
Subhash Gupta; Sapan Desai	Men's pair	349.00	393.00	370.30	320.60	1432.90	21 Q	562.00	330.00	160.60	1052.60	11 Q	201.00	105.00	306.00	12
Pranab Bardhan; Shibhnath Sarkar	Men's pair	402.00	432.00	397.00	416.10	1647.10	5 Q	532.00	385.00	183.60	1100.60	5 Q	275.00	109.00	384.00	1st place, gold medalist(s)
Hema Deora; Marianne Karmarkar	Women's pair	237.00	261.40	233.70	177.00	909.10	3 Q	405.10	258.00	107.00	770.10	5 Q	231.00	118.00	349.00	7
Vasanti Shah; Bharati Dey	Women's pair	223.00	174.30	210.40	178.00	785.70	18	did not advance								18
Aparna Sain; Feroza Chothia	Women's pair	214.00	237.70	234.00	154.00	839.70	14 Q	323.10	246.00	82.00	651.10	16	did not advance			16
Arun Kumar Sinha; Rita Choksi	Mixed pair	253.30	292.00	281.50	223.00	1049.80	24	did not advance								24
Bachiraju Satyanarayana; Kiran Nadar	Mixed pair	368.70	296.00	295.60	333.00	1293.30	6 Q	398.00	250.60	124.10	772.70	2 Q	188.00	145.00	333.00	5
Rajeev Khandelwal; Himani Khandelwal	Mixed pair	383.80	324.00	275.30	296.00	1279.10	9 Q	378.00	272.70	88.60	739.30	5 Q	211.00	118.00	329.00	7

Team

Athlete	Event	Qualification Round		Semifinals				Final				
Athlete	Event	Score	Rank	1	2	3	Total	1	2	3	Total	Rank
Sumit Mukherjee; Debabrata Majumder; Jaggy Shivdasani; Rajeshwar Tewari; Ajay Khare; Raju Tolani	Men's team	162.61	4 Q	25.67	41.00	27.00	93.67	did not advance				3rd place, bronze medalist(s)
Finton Lewis; Marianne Karmarkar; Bharati Dey; Vasanti Shah; Pranab Bardhan; Shibhnath Sarkar	Supermixed team	81.54	8	did not advance								8
Bachiraju Satyanarayana; Rajeev Khandelwal; Gopinath Manna; Himani Khandelwal; Hema Deora; Kiran Nadar	Mixed team	172.56	1 Q	69.67	19.00	21.00	109.67	did not advance				3rd place, bronze medalist(s)

== Canoeing ==
Slalom

Athlete	Event	Heats		Semifinal		Final		Rank
Athlete	Event	Score	Rank	Score	Rank	Score	Rank	Rank
Aarti Pandey	Women's K-1	137.65	11	Did not advance				
Champa Mourya	Women's C-1	171.22	9 Q	176.14	7 Q	161.63	7	7

Sprint

Athlete	Event	Heat		Semifinal		Final		Rank
Athlete	Event	Time	Rank	Time	Rank	Time	Rank	Rank
Naocha Laitonjam	Men's K-1 200 m	41.151	7 SF	39.716	7	did not advance		13
Chingching Arambam; Naocha Laitonjam	Men's K-2 1000 m	3:53.449	6 SF	3:35.613	1 FA	3:48.627	9	9
Chingching Arambam; Albert Raj Selvraj; Naocha Laitonjam; Prohit Borai	Men's K-4 500 m	1:37.549	5 SF	1:33.587	2 FA	1:40.809	9	9
Jamesboy Oinam; Prakant Sharma	Men's C-2 200 m	43.452	5 SF	40.838	1 FA	41.152	9	9
Gaurav Tomar; Sunil Singh	Men's C-2 1000 m	—N/a				3:56.477	6	6
Ragina Kiro	Women's K-1 200 m	51.239	6 SF	47.515	4	did not advance		10
Sonia Phairembam	Women's K-1 500 m	—N/a				2:20.606	8	8
Ragina Kiro; Sonia Phairembam; Sandhya Kispotta; Meena Lasihram	Women's K-4 500 m	—N/a				1:51.729	9	9
Meera Das	Women's C-1 200 m	DNF	—	Did not advance				—
Inaocha Mayanglanbam; Anjali Baishst	Women's C-2 500 m	—N/a				2:18.924	8	8

Traditional boat race

Athlete	Event	Heat		Repechage		Semifinal		Final / TR		Rank
Athlete	Event	Time	Rank	Time	Rank	Time	Rank	Time	Rank	Rank
Bijender Singh; Ravinder; Manmohan Dangi; Dilip Singh Negi; Abhay Singh; Arun Nandal; Suraj Singh Negi; Ankit Pachori; Satyapal Tomar; Kiran Moraingtham; Hariom Kurmi; Sachin Kumar; Parminder Singh; Manjeet Singh; Nganba Heisnam; Sivasankar Baburaj	Men's 200 m	55.604	5 R	56.162	5 FB	did not advance		57.397	5	11
Bijender Singh; Ravinder; Manmohan Dangi; Dilip Singh Negi; Abhay Singh; Arun Nandal; Suraj Singh Negi; Ankit Pachori; Satyapal Tomar; Kiran Moraingtham; Hariom Kurmi; Sachin Kumar; Parminder Singh; Manjeet Singh; Nganba Heisnam; Sivasankar Baburaj	Men's 500 m	2:24.806	5 R	2:23.162	2 SF	2:22.505	9 FB	2:24.965	4	10
Bijender Singh; Ravinder; Manmohan Dangi; Dilip Singh Negi; Abhay Singh; Arun Nandal; Suraj Singh Negi; Ankit Pachori; Satyapal Tomar; Kiran Moraingtham; Hariom Kurmi; Sachin Kumar; Parminder Singh; Manjeet Singh; Nganba Heisnam; Sivasankar Baburaj	Men's 1000 m	4:54.198	5 R	4:51.810	2 SF	4:47.649	8 FB	4:55.689	3	9
Rajeshwari Kushram; Sanjana Singh; Nazis Mansoori; Dimita Toijam; Manju; Oinam Yaiphabi Devi; Sushila Chanu Shoibam; Aarti Nath; Neetu Verma; Thajamanbi Chanu; Sarju Kojenbam; Menu; Manisha Rani; Kirti Kewat; Ramkanya Dangi; Shamasakhi Devi	Women's 200 m	1:00.452	5 R	1:00.238	3 SF	1:00.173	5 FB	1:00.116	3	9
Rajeshwari Kushram; Sanjana Singh; Nazis Mansoori; Dimita Toijam; Manju; Oinam Yaiphabi Devi; Sushila Chanu Shoibam; Aarti Nath; Neetu Verma; Thajamanbi Chanu; Sarju Kojenbam; Menu; Manisha Rani; Kirti Kewat; Ramkanya Dangi; Shamasakhi Devi	Women's 500 m	2:32.491	3 SF	—N/a		2:33.987	8 FB	2:35.384	1	7

== Cycling ==
Track

Sprint

Athlete	Event	Qualification		1/16 Finals	1/8 Finals	Quarterfinal	Semifinal	Final	
Athlete	Event	Time Speed	Rank	Opposition Time	Opposition Time	Opposition Time	Opposition Time	Opposition Time	Rank
Esow Alben	Men's individual	10.438	16	Tapimay (THA); W 0.144	Im C-b (KOR); L −0.434	did not advance			
Ranjit Singh	Men's individual	10.639	18	Admadi (INA); L −0.008	did not advance				
Esow Alben; Ranjit Singh; Appolonious	Men's team	46.862	9	—N/a				Did not advance	9
Deborah Herold	Women's individual	11.775	12 Q	—N/a	Lee (HKG); L −0.703	did not advance			
Aleena Reji	Women's individual	12.339	16 Q	—N/a	Lee W S (HKG); L −0.852	did not advance			
Deborah Herold; Sonali Chanu	Women's team	35.305	7	—N/a				Did not advance	7

Pursuit

Athlete	Event	Qualifying		Round 1		Final	
Athlete	Event	Time	Rank	Opposition Time	Rank	Opposition Time	Rank
Manjeet Singh	Men's individual	4:43.714	12	—N/a		Did not advance	12
Raju Bati; Manjeet Singh; Bike Singh Athokpam; Dilawar Singh	Men's team	4:23.251	10	did not advance			10
Chaoba Devi	Women's individual	4:05.298	10	—N/a		Did not advance	10
Sonali Chanu; Nayana Priyadarshini; Chaoba Devi; Megha Gugad	Women's team	5:05.388	5 Q	5:07.863	5	Did not advance	5

Keirin

Athlete	Event	Round 1	Repechage	Round 2	Final
Athlete	Event	Rank	Rank	Rank	Rank
Esow Alben	Men	4 R	6	did not advance	
Ranjit Singh	Men	7 R	5	did not advance	
Deborah Herold	Women	4 R	5	did not advance	
Sonali Chanu	Women	5 R	4	did not advance	

Omnium

Athlete	Event	Scratch Race		Tempo Race		Elim. Race		Points Race		Total	Rank
Athlete	Event	Points	Rank	Points	Rank	Points	Rank	Points	Rank	Total	Rank
Manjeet Singh	Men	10	16	10	16	6	18	DNF		26	–
Monorama Tongbram	Women	24	9	20	11	18	12	−40	11	22	11

== Equestrian ==
Men

Eventing

Athlete	Horse	Event	Dressage	Cross-country	Jumping	Total	Rank
Ashish Malik	Ch Frimuer Du Record	Individual	35.10	20.00	0.00	55.10	16
Rakesh Kumar	Veni Vedi Vici	Individual	35.40	0.40	4.00	39.80	10
Jitender Singh	Dalakhani Du Routy	Individual	28.80	55.20	8.00	92.00	20
Fouaad Mirza	Seigneur Medicott	Individual	22.40	0.00	4.00	26.40	2nd place, silver medalist(s)
Ashish Malik; Rakesh Kumar; Jitender Singh; Fouaad Mirza	As above	Team	86.30	27.00	8.00	121.30	2nd place, silver medalist(s)

Show jumping

Athlete	Horse	Event	1st Qualification		Qualifier 1		Qualifier 2		Final 1		Final 2	
Athlete	Horse	Event	Overall	Rank	Overall	Rank	Overall	Rank	Overall	Rank	Overall	Rank
Kaevaan Setalvad	Cherokee	Individual	12.88	50	13.00	49	13.00	44	51.88	36	51.88	36
Zahan Setalvad	Quintus Z	Individual	15.62	57	6.00	27	6.00	37	37.62	30	_	EL
Chetan Reddy	Elco V M	Individual	43.85	63	did not advance							
Kaevaan Setalvad; Zahan Setalvad; Chetan Reddy	As above	Team	72.35	17	did not advance		—N/a				did not advance	

Reserve horse:
Tethys De Beauval

== Fencing ==
Women

Event	Athlete	Preliminaries						Round of 32	Round of 16	Quarterfinals	Semifinals	Final	
Event	Athlete	Opposition Score	Opposition Score	Opposition Score	Opposition Score	Opposition Score	Rank	Opposition Score	Opposition Score	Opposition Score	Opposition Score	Opposition Score	Rank
Jas Seerat Singh	Individual épée	Tran T T T (VIE); W 5–4	Oishi (JPN); L 1–5	Salameh (LBN); L 1–5	Kang Y-m (KOR); L 2–5	Megawati (INA); W 5–3	5 Q	Thanee (THA); L 13–15	did not advance				
Jyotika Dutta	Individual épée	Baatarchuluun (MGL); W 5–3	Choi I-j (KOR); L 3–5	Abella (PHI); W 5–1	Balaganskaya (KAZ); W 5–3	Tannous (LBN); W 5–2	1 Q	Bye	Takhamwong (THA); W 15–8	Kong (HKG); L 3–15	did not advance		
Kabita Devi; Ena Arora; Jas Seerat Singh; Jyotika Dutta	Team épée	—N/a							Indonesia (INA); W 45–24	China (CHN); L 25–45	did not advance		

== Field hockey ==
India put up a men's and a women's team of a total of 32 athletes (16 men and 16 women).

Summary

Team	Event	Group stage						Semifinal	Final / BM	
Team	Event	Opposition Score	Opposition Score	Opposition Score	Opposition Score	Opposition Score	Rank	Opposition Score	Opposition Score	Rank
India men	Men's tournament	Indonesia; W 17–0	Hong Kong; W 26–0	Japan; W 8–0	South Korea; W 5–3	Sri Lanka; W 20–0	1 Q	Malaysia; L 6–7^{P} FT: 2–2	Pakistan; W 2–1	3rd place, bronze medalist(s)
India women	Women's tournament	Indonesia; W 8–0	Kazakhstan; W 21–0	South Korea; W 4–1	Thailand; W 5–1	—N/a	1 Q	China; W 1–0	Japan; L 1–2	2nd place, silver medalist(s)

=== Men's tournament ===
Squad

The following is the India roster in the men's field hockey tournament of the 2018 Asian Games.

Head coach: (India) Harendra Singh

1. Harmanpreet Singh
2. Dilpreet Singh
3. Rupinder Pal Singh
6. Surender Kumar
7. Manpreet Singh
8. Sardara Singh
10. Simranjeet Singh
11. Mandeep Singh
14. Lalit Upadhyay
16. P. R. Sreejesh (C, GK)
19. Krishan Pathak (GK)
22. Varun Kumar
24. S. V. Sunil
26. Birendra Lakra
27. Akashdeep Singh
29. Chinglensana Singh
30. Amit Rohidas
32. Vivek Prasad

Pool A

Pos	Team	Pld	W	D	L	PF	PA	PD	Pts	Qualification
1	India	5	5	0	0	76	3	+73	15	Semi-finals
2	Japan	5	4	0	1	30	11	+19	12	Semi-finals
3	South Korea	5	3	0	2	39	8	+31	9	Fifth place game
4	Sri Lanka	5	2	0	3	7	41	−34	6	Seventh place game
5	Indonesia (H)	5	1	0	4	5	40	−35	3	Ninth place game
6	Hong Kong	5	0	0	5	3	57	−54	0	Eleventh place game

Source: FIH
Rules for classification: 1) points; 2) goal difference; 3) goals scored; 4) head-to-head result.
(H) Hosts

20 August 2018
20:00

India	17–0	Indonesia
Rupinder 1', 3'; Dilpreet 7', 30', 32'; Akashdeep 10'; Simranjeet 13', 38', 53'; S. V. Sunil 25'; Prasad 27'; Mandeep 30', 45', 49'; Harmanpreet 31'; Lalit 45'; Amit 54'	Report

Umpires:
Narongtuch Subboonsung (THA)
Hafiz Atif Latif (PAK)

22 August 2018
14:00

India	26–0	Hong Kong
Akashdeep 2', 32', 39'; Manpreet 3', 17'; Rupinder 3', 5', 45+', 60'; S. V. Sunil 7'; Prasad 14'; Lalit 17', 19', 35', 55'; Mandeep 21'; Varun 23', 30+'; Amit 27'; Harmanpreet 29', 52', 53', 55'; Dilpreet 48'; Chinglensana 51'; Simranjeet 53'	Report

Umpires:
Rawi Anbananthan (MAS)
Narongtuch Subboonsong (THA)

24 August 2018
20:00

Japan	0–8	India
	Report	S. V. Sunil 7'; Dilpreet 12'; Rupinder 17', 38'; Mandeep 32', 57'; Akashdeep 46'; Prasad 47'

Umpires:
Ilanggo Kanabathu (MAS)
Federico Garcia (URU)

26 August 2018
18:00

South Korea	3–5	India
Jung M-j 33', 35'; Jang J-h 60'	Report	Rupinder 1'; Chinglensana 5'; Lalit 16'; Manpreet 49'; Akashdeep 56'

Umpires:
Rawi Anbananthan (MAS)
Gareth Greenfield (NZL)

28 August 2018
16:00

India	20–0	Sri Lanka
Rupinder 2', 52', 53'; Harmanpreet 6', 22', 33'; Akashdeep 10', 11', 18', 23', 33', 43'; Prasad 32'; Mandeep 36', 44', 59'; Amit 38'; Dipreet 53'; Lalit 58', 59'	Report

Umpires:
Ilanggo Kanabathu (MAS)
Saleh Al-Balushi (OMA)

Semifinal

30 August 2018
17:30

India	2–2	Malaysia
Harmanpreet 33'; Varun 40'	Report	Faizal 39'; Razie 59'
Penalties
Manpreet (penalty shoot-out missed); Akashdeep (penalty shoot-out scored); Dilpreet (penalty shoot-out missed); S. V. Sunil (penalty shoot-out missed); Harmanpreet (penalty shoot-out scored); Harmanpreet (penalty shoot-out scored); Akashdeep (penalty shoot-out scored); Manpreet (penalty shoot-out scored); Dilpreet (penalty shoot-out scored); S. V. Sunil (penalty shoot-out missed)	6–7	(penalty shoot-out scored) Firhan; (penalty shoot-out missed) Tajuddin; (penalty shoot-out missed) Faizal; (penalty shoot-out missed) M. Hasan; (penalty shoot-out scored) Fitri; (penalty shoot-out scored) Firhan; (penalty shoot-out scored) Fitri; (penalty shoot-out scored) M. Hasan; (penalty shoot-out scored) Faizal; (penalty shoot-out scored) Tajuddin

Umpires:
Gareth Greenfield (NZL)
Kim Hong-lae (KOR)

Bronze medal game

1 September 2018
17:30

Pakistan	1–2	India
Atiq 52'	Report	Akashdeep 3'; Harmanpreet 50'

Umpires:
Ilanggo Kanabathu (MAS)
Gareth Greenfield (NZL)

=== Women's tournament ===
Squad

The following is the India roster in the women's field hockey tournament of the 2018 Asian Games.

Head coach: (Netherlands) Sjoerd Marijne

1. Navjot Kaur
2. Gurjit Kaur
3. Deep Grace Ekka
4. Monika Malik
6. Reena Khokhar
8. Nikki Pradhan
11. Savita Punia (GK)
13. Rajani Etimarpu (GK)
16. Vandana Katariya
17. Deepika Thakur
18. Udita
19. Namita Toppo
20. Lalremsiami
25. Navneet Kaur
26. Sunita Lakra
28. Rani Rampal (C)
31. Lilima Minz
32. Neha Goyal

Pool B

Pos	Team	Pld	W	D	L	PF	PA	PD	Pts	Qualification
1	India	4	4	0	0	38	1	+37	12	Semifinals
2	South Korea	4	3	0	1	17	4	+13	9	Semifinals
3	Thailand	4	1	0	3	3	11	−8	3	5th place game
4	Indonesia (H)	4	1	0	3	2	16	−14	3	7th place game
5	Kazakhstan	4	1	0	3	4	32	−28	3	9th place game

Source: FIH
Rules for classification: 1) points; 2) goal difference; 3) goals scored; 4) head-to-head result.
(H) Hosts

19 August 2018
20:00

India	8–0	Indonesia
Udita 9'; Katariya 14', 28'; Gurjit 17', 22', 57'; Lalremsiami 25'; Navneet 50'	Report

Umpires:
Chieko Soma (JPN)
Chen Mei-chen (TPE)

21 August 2018
20:00

India	21–0	Kazakhstan
Gurjit 7', 36', 44', 52'; Lalremsiami 9', 19', 30'; Goyal 10'; Navneet 11', 12', 49'; Navjot 16', 54'; Katariya 29', 37', 53'; Udita 34'; Minz 38', 45'; Ekka 43'; Malik 55'	Report

Umpires:
Liu Xiaoying (CHN)
Cookie Tan (SGP)

25 August 2018
20:00

India	4–1	South Korea
N. Kaur 16'; G. Kaur 54', 55'; Katariya 56'	Report	Lee Y. 21'

Umpires:
Liu Xiaoying (CHN)
Ayanna McClean (TTO)

27 August 2018
14:00

Thailand	0–5	India
	Report	Rampal 37', 46', 56'; Malik 52'; N. Kaur 55'

Umpires:
Junko Wagatsuma (JPN)
Chen Mei-chen (TPE)

Semifinal

29 August 2018
20:00

India	1–0	China
G. Kaur 52'	Report

Umpires:
Chieko Soma (JPN)
Kim Yoon-seon (KOR)

Gold medal game

31 August 2018
20:00

Japan	2–1	India
Shimizu 11'; Kawamura 44'	Report	Goyal 25'

Umpires:
Kelly Hudson (NZL)
Liu Xiaoying (CHN)

== Golf ==
The Indian Golf Union announced a team of seven members for the Jakarta Games.

Men

Athlete	Event	Round 1	Round 2	Round 3	Round 4	Total		
Athlete	Event	Score	Score	Score	Score	Score	Par	Rank
Aadil Bedi	Individual	69	70	74	73	286	−2	=13
Kshitij Naveed Kaul	Individual	73	68	76	72	289	+1	=23
Harimohan Singh	Individual	77	73	77	82	309	+21	53
Rayhan Thomas	Individual	71	69	73	73	286	−2	=13
Aadil Bedi; Kshitij Naveed Kaul; Harimohan Singh; Rayhan Thomas	Team	213	207	223	218	861	−3	7

Women

Athlete	Event	Round 1	Round 2	Round 3	Round 4	Total		
Athlete	Event	Score	Score	Score	Score	Score	Par	Rank
Diksha Dagar	Individual	71	78	74	72	295	+7	=22
Ridhima Dilawari	Individual	77	72	72	71	292	+4	=17
Sifat Sagoo	Individual	75	72	75	73	295	+7	=22
Diksha Dagar; Ridhima Dilawari; Sifat Sagoo	Team	146	144	146	143	579	+3	8

== Gymnastics ==
Artistic

Men
Team Qualification & All-around Finals (Note: Only the top three performers in each event accounted for the total score for that particular event.)

Athlete	Event	Floor (gymnastics)		Pommel horse		Rings (gymnastics)		Vault (gymnastics)		Parallel bars		Horizontal bar		Total (All-around)	
Athlete	Event	Score	Rank	Score	Rank	Score	Rank	Score	Rank	Score	Rank	Score	Rank	Score	Rank
Rakesh Patra	All-around	—N/a				13.900	20	—N/a		13.300	23	—N/a			
Yogeshwar Singh	All-around	12.450	28	12.150	30	12.650	41	13.850	10	13.000	30	11.550	43	75.950	17
Gaurav Kumar	All-around	11.950	39	3.250	56	13.000	33	12.850	—N/a	13.200	25	12.250	30	66.500	27
Ashish Kumar	All-around	13.100	17	9.900	47	13.050	32	13.525	12	12.500	37	11.900	37	74.550	20
Siddharth Verma	All-around	11.400	48	12.600	23	—N/a		12.975	18	—N/a		12.850	20	—N/a	
Total	Team	37.500	10	34.650	11	39.950	8	41.350	8	39.500	6	37.000	9	229.950	9

Women
Team Qualification & All-around Finals

Athlete	Event	Vault (gymnastics)		Uneven bars		Balance beam		Floor (gymnastics)		Total (All-around)	
Athlete	Event	Score	Rank	Score	Rank	Score	Rank	Score	Rank	Score	Rank
Dipa Karmakar	All-around	13.225	8	11.200	27	12.750	7 Q	11.300	28	48.700	13
Pranati Das	All-around	—N/a		11.000	30	11.900	19	11.300	30	—N/a	
Aruna Reddy	All-around	13.350	7 Q	11.400	23	11.850	21	11.250	32	47.900	16
Mandira Chowdhury	All-around	—N/a				10.350	46	—N/a			
Pranati Nayak	All-around	13.425	6 Q	10.200	36	—N/a		10.750	39	—N/a	
Total	Team	40.350	4	33.600	7	36.500	4	33.850	9	144.300	7 Q

Team & Individual Finals

Athlete	Event	Vault (gymnastics)		Uneven bars		Balance beam		Floor (gymnastics)		Total	
Athlete	Event	Score	Rank	Score	Rank	Score	Rank	Score	Rank	Score	Rank
Aruna Reddy	Vault	12.775	7	—N/a						12.775	7
Pranati Nayak	Vault	12.650	8	—N/a						12.650	8
Dipa Karmakar	Balance beam	—N/a				12.500	5	—N/a		12.500	5
Dipa Karmakar; Pranati Nayak; Aruna Reddy; Pranati Das; Mandira Chowdhury	Team	39.100	7	32.400	7	32.400	6	34.150	7	138.050	7

== Handball ==
India men's and women's team participate at the Games. The men's team entered in group D, and the women's team joined in group A.

Summary

Key:

- ET – After extra time
- P – Match decided by penalty-shootout.

Team	Event	Preliminary					Main / Class.					Semifinals / Pl.	Final / BM / Pl.	
Team	Event	Opposition Score	Opposition Score	Opposition Score	Opposition Score	Rank	Opposition Score	Opposition Score	Opposition Score	Opposition Score	Rank	Opposition Score	Opposition Score	Rank
India men	Men's tournament	Chinese Taipei (TPE); L 28–38	Bahrain (BHR); L 25–32	Iraq (IRQ); L 29–40	—N/a	4	Malaysia (MAS); W 45–19	Pakistan (PAK); W 28–27	Chinese Taipei (TPE); L 31–35	Indonesia (INA); W 37–23	10	did not advance		10
India women	Women's tournament	Kazakhstan (KAZ); L 19–36	South Korea (KOR); L 18–45	China (CHN); L 21–36	North Korea (PRK); L 49–19	5	—N/a					Did not advance	Malaysia (MAS); W 54–19	9

Men's tournament

Roster

- Atul Kumar
- Deepak Ahlawat
- Adithya Nagaraj
- Harjinder Singh
- Naveen Punia
- Greenidge Dcunha
- Navdeep
- Karamjeet Singh
- Avin Khatkar
- Ramesh Chand
- Sachin Kumar Bhardwaj
- Kamaljeet Singh
- Rahul Dubey
- Harender Singh
- Davinder Singh
- Bajrang Thakur

Group D

Pos	Team	Pld	W	D	L	GF	GA	GD	Pts	Qualification
1	Bahrain	3	3	0	0	99	70	+29	6	Main round / Group 1–2
2	Iraq	3	2	0	1	101	89	+12	4	Main round / Group 1–2
3	Chinese Taipei	3	1	0	2	89	102	−13	2	Main round / Group 3
4	India	3	0	0	3	82	110	−28	0	Main round / Group 3

Source: AHF

13 August; 11:00	India	28–38	Chinese Taipei	POPKI Sports Hall, Jakarta; Referees: Al-Wahibi, Al-Shahi (OMA)
13 August; 11:00	Hare. Singh 8	(13–19)	Chiu 8	POPKI Sports Hall, Jakarta; Referees: Al-Wahibi, Al-Shahi (OMA)
13 August; 11:00	2× (yellow card) 3× (suspension)		1× (yellow card) 3× (suspension)	POPKI Sports Hall, Jakarta; Referees: Al-Wahibi, Al-Shahi (OMA)

15 August; 20:00	India	25–32	Bahrain	POPKI Sports Hall, Jakarta; Referees: Al-Saqer, Al-Suqufi (KSA)
15 August; 20:00	Ahlawat 6	(11–18)	Habib 6	POPKI Sports Hall, Jakarta; Referees: Al-Saqer, Al-Suqufi (KSA)
15 August; 20:00	2× (yellow card) 4× (suspension)		3× (yellow card) 5× (suspension)	POPKI Sports Hall, Jakarta; Referees: Al-Saqer, Al-Suqufi (KSA)

17 August; 18:00	India	29–40	Iraq	POPKI Sports Hall, Jakarta; Referees: Al-Wahibi, Al-Shahi (OMA)
17 August; 18:00	Ahlawat 8	(13–18)	Adil 9	POPKI Sports Hall, Jakarta; Referees: Al-Wahibi, Al-Shahi (OMA)
17 August; 18:00	2× (yellow card) 5× (suspension)		3× (yellow card) 1× (suspension)	POPKI Sports Hall, Jakarta; Referees: Al-Wahibi, Al-Shahi (OMA)

Classification round – Group III

Pos	Team	Pld	W	D	L	GF	GA	GD	Pts
1	Chinese Taipei	4	4	0	0	142	95	+47	8
2	India	4	3	0	1	141	104	+37	6
3	Pakistan	4	2	0	2	134	111	+23	4
4	Indonesia	4	1	0	3	96	124	−28	2
5	Malaysia	4	0	0	4	78	157	−79	0

Source: AHF

20 August; 11:00	India	45–19	Malaysia	POPKI Sports Hall, Jakarta; Referees: Li, Ke (CHN)
20 August; 11:00	D. Singh 13	(25–8)	Abdul Karim, Jamaluddin 4	POPKI Sports Hall, Jakarta; Referees: Li, Ke (CHN)
20 August; 11:00	1× (yellow card) 2× (suspension)		4× (suspension)	POPKI Sports Hall, Jakarta; Referees: Li, Ke (CHN)

24 August; 11:00	Pakistan	27–28	India	POPKI Sports Hall, Jakarta; Referees: Li, Ke (CHN)
24 August; 11:00	M. Hussain 7	(12–14)	D'Cunha 9	POPKI Sports Hall, Jakarta; Referees: Li, Ke (CHN)
24 August; 11:00	2× (yellow card) 3× (suspension)		3× (yellow card) 2× (suspension)	POPKI Sports Hall, Jakarta; Referees: Li, Ke (CHN)

26 August; 11:00	India	31–35	Chinese Taipei	POPKI Sports Hall, Jakarta; Referees: Ota, Shimajiri (JPN)
26 August; 11:00	D. Singh 10	(12–15)	Chiu 11	POPKI Sports Hall, Jakarta; Referees: Ota, Shimajiri (JPN)
26 August; 11:00	1× (yellow card) 3× (suspension)		2× (yellow card) 4× (suspension)	POPKI Sports Hall, Jakarta; Referees: Ota, Shimajiri (JPN)

29 August; 14:00	India	37–23	Indonesia	POPKI Sports Hall, Jakarta; Referees: Al-Suqufi, Al-Saqer (KSA)
29 August; 14:00	D. Singh 11	(16–13)	Tolang 9	POPKI Sports Hall, Jakarta; Referees: Al-Suqufi, Al-Saqer (KSA)
29 August; 14:00	3× (suspension)		2× (yellow card) 7× (suspension)	POPKI Sports Hall, Jakarta; Referees: Al-Suqufi, Al-Saqer (KSA)

Women's tournament

Roster

- Nina Shil
- Nidhi Sharma
- Maninder Kaur
- Sanjeeta
- Jyoti Shukla
- Banita Sharma
- Deepa
- Ritu
- Indu Gupta
- Rimpi
- Khila Devi
- Diksha Kumari
- Priyanka Thakur
- KM Manjula Pathak

Group A

Pos	Team	Pld	W	D	L	GF	GA	GD	Pts	Qualification
1	South Korea	4	4	0	0	151	86	+65	8	Semifinals
2	China	4	2	0	2	120	112	+8	4 (Note: Tied on head-to-head points (2). Head-to-head goal difference: CHN +2, PRK +1, KAZ −3.)	Semifinals
3	North Korea	4	2	0	2	139	125	+14	4	Classification 5th–8th
4	Kazakhstan	4	2	0	2	118	116	+2	4	Classification 5th–8th
5	India	4	0	0	4	77	166	−89	0	Classification 9th–10th

Source: AHF
Notes:

14 August; 11:00	India	19–36	Kazakhstan	POPKI Sports Hall, Jakarta; Referees: Lee, Koo (KOR)
14 August; 11:00	Rimpi 8	(13–19)	Abilda 8	POPKI Sports Hall, Jakarta; Referees: Lee, Koo (KOR)
14 August; 11:00	2× (yellow card) 5× (suspension)		2× (yellow card) 2× (suspension)	POPKI Sports Hall, Jakarta; Referees: Lee, Koo (KOR)

16 August; 16:00	India	18–45	South Korea	POPKI Sports Hall, Jakarta; Referees: Shakir, Kadhim (IRQ)
16 August; 16:00	Ritu 6	(9–20)	Yu 12	POPKI Sports Hall, Jakarta; Referees: Shakir, Kadhim (IRQ)
16 August; 16:00	1× (yellow card) 4× (suspension)		1× (yellow card) 1× (suspension)	POPKI Sports Hall, Jakarta; Referees: Shakir, Kadhim (IRQ)

19 August; 16:00	India	21–36	China	POPKI Sports Hall, Jakarta; Referees: Al-Saqer, Al-Suqufi (KSA)
19 August; 16:00	Kaur 10	(9–19)	Zhang 7	POPKI Sports Hall, Jakarta; Referees: Al-Saqer, Al-Suqufi (KSA)
19 August; 16:00	3× (yellow card) 2× (suspension)		2× (yellow card) 4× (suspension)	POPKI Sports Hall, Jakarta; Referees: Al-Saqer, Al-Suqufi (KSA)

21 August; 14:00	North Korea	49–19	India	POPKI Sports Hall, Jakarta; Referees: Hizaki, Ikebuchi (JPN)
21 August; 14:00	Choe P. 11	(23–10)	Ghanghas, Kaur, Rimpi 4	POPKI Sports Hall, Jakarta; Referees: Hizaki, Ikebuchi (JPN)
21 August; 14:00	2× (yellow card) 3× (suspension)		3× (yellow card) 4× (suspension)	POPKI Sports Hall, Jakarta; Referees: Hizaki, Ikebuchi (JPN)

Ninth place game

25 August; 14:00	India	54–19	Malaysia	POPKI Sports Hall, Jakarta; Referees: Ota, Shimajiri (JPN)
25 August; 14:00	D. Thakur, Gupta, Devi 8	(19–5)	Yusop 7	POPKI Sports Hall, Jakarta; Referees: Ota, Shimajiri (JPN)
25 August; 14:00	2× (yellow card) 4× (suspension)		2× (yellow card) 6× (suspension)	POPKI Sports Hall, Jakarta; Referees: Ota, Shimajiri (JPN)

== Judo ==
Athlete	Event	Round of 32	Round of 16	Quarterfinal	Semifinal	Repechage	Final	Rank
Athlete	Event	Opposition Result	Opposition Result	Opposition Result	Opposition Result	Opposition Result	Opposition Result	Rank
Vijay Kumar Yadav	Men's 60 kg	Bye	Urozboev (UZB); L 0–10	did not advance				
Harshdeep Singh Brar	Men's 81 kg	Pushpakumara (SRI); W 10–0s1	Lee S-s (KOR); L 0s3–10s1	did not advance				
Avtar Singh	Men's 100 kg	Bye	Remarenco (UAE); L 0s1–10	did not advance				
Kalpana Devi	Women's 52 kg	Bye	Ziyaeva (UZB); L 0s3–10s2	did not advance				
Garima Chaudhary	Women's 70 kg	—N/a	Matniyazova (UZB); L 0–10	did not advance				
Rajwinder Kaur	Women's +78 kg	—N/a	Bye	Sone (JPN); L 0s1–10	Did not advance	Tsai J-w (TPE); L 0s2–10	did not advance	
Vijay Kumar Yadav; Harshdeep Singh Brar; Avtar Singh; Th. Kalpana Devi; Garima Chaudhary; Rajwinder Kaur	Mixed team	—N/a	Nepal (NEP); W 4–1	Kazakhstan (KAZ); L 0–4	did not advance			

== Kabaddi ==
India put up a 24-member squad (12 men +12 women) for Kabaddi.

Summary

Team	Event	Group stage					Semifinal	Final	
Team	Event	Opposition Score	Opposition Score	Opposition Score	Opposition Score	Rank	Opposition Score	Opposition Score	Rank
India men	Men's tournament	Bangladesh; W 50–21	Sri Lanka; W 44–28	South Korea; L 23–24	Thailand; W 49–30	2 Q	Iran; L 18–27	Did not advance	3rd place, bronze medalist(s)
India women	Women's tournament	Japan; W 43–12	Thailand; W 33–23	Sri Lanka; W 38–12	Indonesia; W 54–22	1 Q	Chinese Taipei; W 27–14	Iran; L 24–27	2nd place, silver medalist(s)

=== Men's tournament ===
Roster

- Monu Goyat
- Rahul Chaudhari
- Mohit Chillar
- Ajay Thakur (captain)
- Girish Maruti Ernak
- Pardeep Narwal
- Sandeep Narwal
- Raju Lal Choudhary
- Rishank Devadiga
- Rohit Kumar
- Deepak Niwas Hooda
- Gangadhari Mallesh

Group A

Pos	Team	Pld	W	D	L	PF	PA	PD	Pts	Qualification
1	South Korea	4	4	0	0	147	84	+63	8	Semifinals
2	India	4	3	0	1	166	103	+63	6	Semifinals
3	Bangladesh	4	2	0	2	102	135	−33	4	
4	Sri Lanka	4	1	0	3	121	135	−14	2	
5	Thailand	4	0	0	4	102	181	−79	0	

Source: OCA

19 August
14:00

Bangladesh	21–50 (HT: 12–20)	India

Garuda Theatre, Jakarta

19 August
19:00

India	44–28 (HT: 27–13)	Sri Lanka

Garuda Theatre, Jakarta

20 August
16:00

India	23–24 (HT: 11–14)	South Korea

Garuda Theatre, Jakarta

21 August
17:00

India	49–30 (HT: 21–12)	Thailand

Garuda Theatre, Jakarta

Semifinal

23 August
18:00

Iran	27–18 (HT: 9–9)	India

Garuda Theatre, Jakarta

=== Women's tournament ===
Roster

- Sakshi Kumari
- Kavita Thakur
- Shalini Pathak
- Randeep Kaur Khehra
- Payel Chowdhury
- Sonali Vishnu Shingate
- Priyanka Negi
- Ritu Negi
- Sayali Sanjay Keripale
- Usha Rani Narasimhaiah
- Manpreet Kaur
- Madhu Malviya

Group A

Pos	Team	Pld	W	D	L	PF	PA	PD	Pts	Qualification
1	India	4	4	0	0	168	69	+99	8	Semifinals
2	Thailand	4	3	0	1	142	75	+67	6	Semifinals
3	Sri Lanka	4	2	0	2	83	113	−30	4	
4	Indonesia	4	1	0	3	84	145	−61	2	
5	Japan	4	0	0	4	63	138	−75	0	

Source: OCA

19 August
9:00

India	43–12 (HT: 19–8)	Japan

Garuda Theatre, Jakarta

20 August
10:40

India	33–23 (HT: 12–10)	Thailand

Garuda Theatre, Jakarta

21 August
9:00

India	38–12 (HT: 23–4)	Sri Lanka

Garuda Theatre, Jakarta

21 August
12:20

India	54–22 (HT: 28–10)	Indonesia

Garuda Theatre, Jakarta

Semifinal

23 August
15:00

India	27–14 (HT: 11–8)	Chinese Taipei

Garuda Theatre, Jakarta

Final

24 August
15:00

India	24–27 (HT: 13–11)	Iran

Garuda Theatre, Jakarta

== Karate ==
The Indian Karate team for the Asian Games 2018 is as follows:

Men

Athlete	Event	1/16 final	1/8 final	Quarterfinal	Semifinal	Repechage 2	Repechage Final	Final	Rank
Athlete	Event	Opposition Result	Opposition Result	Opposition Result	Opposition Result	Opposition Result	Opposition Result	Opposition Result	Rank
Jayendran Sharath Kumar	Kumite- 75kg	Kim M-i (KOR); L 0–1	Did Not Advance						
Vishal Mehta	Kumite- 84kg	—N/a	Bye	Akhatov (UZB); L 0–8	did not advance				

== Martial arts – Kurash ==
Men

Athlete	Event	Round of 32	Round of 16	Quarterfinal	Semifinal	Final	Rank
Athlete	Event	Opposition Result	Opposition Result	Opposition Result	Opposition Result	Opposition Result	Rank
Jatin	66 kg	Choi H-j (KOR); W 1–0	Chan H-c (TPE); L 0–3	Did Not Advance			
Jacky Gahlot	66 kg	Adiya (MGL); L 0–10	Did Not Advance				
Kunal	81 kg	Bayanmunkh (MGL); L 0–10	Did Not Advance				
Manish Tokas	81 kg	Sobirov (UZB); L 0–10	Did Not Advance				
Divesh	90 kg	Bye	Imamov (UZB); L 0–10	did not advance			
Danish Sharma	90 kg	Alfais (INA); W 3–0	Abueida (PLE); W 10–0	Misri (KUW); L 0–10	Did Not Advance		
Parikshit Kumar	+90 kg	Bye	Jaghargh (IRI); L 0–10	Did Not Advance			
Aswin Chandran	+90 kg	Taganov (TKM); L 0–10	Did Not Advance				

Women

Athlete	Event	Round of 32	Round of 16	Quarterfinal	Semifinal	Final	Rank
Athlete	Event	Opposition Result	Opposition Result	Opposition Result	Opposition Result	Opposition Result	Rank
Pincky Balhara	52 kg	Bye	Tsou C-w (TPE); W 5–0	Susanti (INA); W 3–0	Abdumajidova (UZB); W 3–0	Sulaymanova (UZB); L 0–10	2nd place, silver medalist(s)
Malaprabha Jadhav	52 kg	Dawa (PHI); W 3–0	Saparova (TKM); W 10–0	Văn N T (VIE); W 5–0	Sulaymanova (UZB); L 0–10	Did not advance	3rd place, bronze medalist(s)
Binisha Nayakattu Biju	63 kg	Koolivand (IRI); L 0–3	did not advance				
Megha Tokas	63 kg	Bye	Nasyrova (TKM); W 10–0	Shifa (INA); L 0–3	did not advance		
Jyoti Tokas	78 kg	Meesri (THA); W 1–0	Lohova (TKM); L 0–10	did not advance			
Amisha Tokas	78 kg	Bye	Nguyễn T L (VIE); L 0–5	did not advance			

== Martial arts – Pencak silat ==
Men

Athlete	Event	Round of 16	Quarterfinal	Semifinal	Final	
Athlete	Event	Opposition Score	Opposition Score	Opposition Score	Opposition Score	Rank
Boynao Naorem	55 kg	Uulu (KGZ); W 5–0	Dumaan (PHI); L 0–5	Did not advance		

Women

Athlete	Event	Total	
Athlete	Event	Score	Rank
Sonia; Simran Tatwaria	Double	527	7

== Martial arts – Wushu ==
Sanda

Athlete	Event	Round of 32	Round of 16	Quarterfinal	Semifinal	Final	
Athlete	Event	Opposition Score	Opposition Score	Opposition Score	Opposition Score	Opposition Score	Rank
Santhosh Kumar	Men's 56 kg	Linn T R (MYA); W 2–0	Wazea (YEM); W 2–0	Paokrathok (THA); W 2–1	Bùi T G (VIE); L 0–2	Did not advance	3rd place, bronze medalist(s)
Surya Bhanu Pratap Singh	Men's 60 kg	Bye	Sofyan (INA); W 2–1	Saclag (PHI); W 2–0	Ahangarian (IRI); L 0–2	Did not advance	3rd place, bronze medalist(s)
Narender Grewal	Men's 65 kg	—N/a	Tabugara (PHI); W 2–1	Rakhimov (UZB); W 2–0	Zafari (IRI); L 0–2	Did not advance	3rd place, bronze medalist(s)
Pardeep Kumar	Men's 70 kg	—N/a	Khurshedzoda (TJK); W 2–0	Riyaya (INA); L 1–2	did not advance		
Sanathoi Yumnam	Women's 52 kg	—N/a	Elaheh (IRI); L 0–2	did not advance			
Naorem Roshibina Devi	Women's 60 kg	—N/a	Bye	Akhtar (PAK); W 2–0	Cai Yy (CHN); L 0–1	Did not advance	3rd place, bronze medalist(s)

Taolu

Athlete	Event	Event 1		Event 2		Total	
Athlete	Event	Score	Rank	Score	Rank	Score	Rank
Sajan Lama	Men's Nanquan/Nangun	8.94	19	9.67	10	18.61	17
Punshiva Meitei	Men's Nanquan/Nangun	9.05	17	8.95	21	18.00	19
Gyandash Singh	Men's Taijijian/Taijiquan	9.59	12	9.70	4	19.29	8
Chirag Sharma	Men's Daoshu/Gunshu	9.65	8	9.39	8	19.04	7
Anjul Namdeo	Men's Changquan	—N/a				9.66	5
Suraj Mayanglambam	Men's Changquan	—N/a				9.51	10
Sanatombi Leimapokpam	Women's Taijijian/Taijiquan	9.63	8	9.35	14	18.98	11

== Roller sports – Speed skating ==
Athlete	Event	Timing	Rank
Amitesh Mishra	Men's 20,000 m	34:00.957	8
Harshveer Sekhon	Men's 20,000 m	DNF	–
Aarathy Kasturi Raj	Women's 20,000 m	44:52.341	7
Varsha Puranik	Women's 20,000 m	44:53.340	8

== Rowing ==
The Rowing Federation of India named the squad for the Asian Games to be held in August–September as follows:

Men

Athlete	Event	Heat		Repechage		Final	
Athlete	Event	Time	Rank	Time	Rank	Time	Rank
Dattu Baban Bhokanal	Single sculls	8:09.21	4 R	7:45.71	2 FA	8:28.56	6
Om Prakash; Sawarn Singh	Double sculls	7:10.26	2 FA	—N/a		6:50.91	4
Sawarn Singh; Dattu Baban Bhokanal; Om Prakash; Sukhmeet Singh	Quadruple sculls	6:15.18	1 FA	—N/a		6:17.13	1st place, gold medalist(s)
Malkeet Singh; Gurinder singh	Pair	7:37.20	3 FA	—N/a		7:10.86	4
Dushyant Chauhan	Lightweight single sculls	7:43.08	2 FA	—N/a		7:18.76	3rd place, bronze medalist(s)
Rohit Kumar; Bhagwan Singh	Lightweight double sculls	6:57.75	3 R	7:14.23	1 FA	7:04.61	3rd place, bronze medalist(s)
Bhopal Singh; Pranay Ganesh; Tejash Shinde; Jagvir Singh	Lightweight four	7:01.20	4 R	6:51.88	2 FA	6:43.20	4
Akshat; Pranay Ganesh; Rahul Giri; Lucky; Pandu Rang; Sumith; Hardeep Singh; Manish Yadav; M. Lakshman Rohith	Lightweight eight	6:18.68	4 R	6:15.62	1 FA	6:15.00	4

Women

Athlete	Event	Heat		Repechage		Final	
Athlete	Event	Time	Rank	Time	Rank	Time	Rank
Sayali Shelake; Pooja Sangwan	Double sculls	8:50.48	6 FA	—N/a		8:21.76	6
Sanjukta Dung Dung; Harpreet Kaur	Pair	9:02.88	9 R	8:54.67	3 FB	8:30.18	7
Harpreet Kaur; Annu; Sanjukta Dung Dung; Sayali Shelake	Four	7:57.33	7 R	7:53.29	4 FA	7:43.39	6

== Sailing ==
Athlete	Event	Race															Total Points	Net Points	Final Rank
Athlete	Event	1	2	3	4	5	6	7	8	9	10	11	12	13	14	15	Total Points	Net Points	Final Rank
Govind Bairagi	Laser 4.7	9	9	4	1	5	6	3	2	13	11	14	4	—N/a			81	67	4
Harshita Tomar	Laser 4.7	6	2	12	11	4	9	6	7	2	2	1	12	—N/a			74	62	3rd place, bronze medalist(s)
Varun Thakkar; K. C. Ganapathy	Men's 49er	1	5	2	1	3	5	4	5	4	5	1	1	5	10 DSQ	1	53	43	3rd place, bronze medalist(s)
Nethra Kumanan	Women's Laser Radial	3	3	5	4	4	3	5	9	7	6	11 RET	5	—N/a			65	54	5
Shweta Shervegar; Varsha Gautham	Women's 49er FX	4	2	3	3	3	2	2	2	2	4	3	4	3	3	4	44	40	2nd place, silver medalist(s)
Dayna Edgar Coelho; Katya Ida Coelho	Mixed RS:One	13	14	16	13	15	16	18	18	12	8	15	15	18	18	18	227	209	8

== Sepak takraw ==
Men

Athletes	Event	Group stage					Semifinal	Final / BM	
Athletes	Event	Opposition Score	Opposition Score	Opposition Score	Opposition Score	Rank	Opposition Score	Opposition Score	Rank
Niken Khangembam; Sandeep Kumar; Henary Wahengbam; Akash Yumnam; Harish Kumar	Regu	South Korea (KOR); L 0–2	Malaysia (MAS); L 0–2	China (CHN); W 2–1	Nepal (NEP); W 2–0	3	did not advance		
Niken Khangembam; Sandeep Kumar; Malemnganba Sorokhaibam; Seitaram Thokchom; Henary Wahengbam; Sanjeck Waikhom; Akash Yumnam; Harish Kumar; Lalit Kumar; Jotin Ngathem; Dheeraj Kumar; Jiteshor Gurumayum	Team regu	Iran (IRI); W 2–1	Indonesia (INA); L 0–3	—N/a		2 Q	Thailand (THA); L 0–2	Did not advance	3rd place, bronze medalist(s)

Women

Athletes	Event	Group stage					Semifinal	Final / BM	
Athletes	Event	Opposition Score	Opposition Score	Opposition Score	Opposition Score	Rank	Opposition Score	Opposition Score	Rank
Dolly Srivastava; Maipak Devi Ayekpam; Khushbu Kannojia; Aruna Devi Mutum; Chaoba Devi Oinam; Rashmi	Quadrant	Japan (JPN); L 0–2	Malaysia (MAS); L 0–2	Vietnam (VIE); L 0–2	Thailand (THA); L 0–2	5	did not advance		
Tharangini Annam; Dolly Srivastava; Maipak Ayekpam; Khushbu Kannojia; Manisha Kumari; Nganthoi Yanglem; Aruna Mutum; Chaoba Oinam; Linthoingambi Pangambam; Rashmi; Ronita Elangbam; Jwensinle Kesen	Team regu	South Korea (KOR); L 0–3	Laos (LAO); L 1–2	Thailand (THA); L 0–3	—N/a	4	did not advance		

== Shooting ==
The Indian squad for the Asian Games announced by the National Rifle Association of India is as follows:

Men

Athlete	Event	Qualification		Final	
Athlete	Event	Score	Rank	Score	Rank
Ravi Kumar	10 m air rifle	626.7	4 Q	205.2	4
Deepak Kumar	10 m air rifle	626.3	5 Q	247.7	2nd place, silver medalist(s)
Sanjeev Rajput	50 m rifle 3 positions	1160	7 Q	452.7	2nd place, silver medalist(s)
Akhil Sheoran	50 m rifle 3 positions	1158	11	Did not advance	
Harjinder Singh	300 m standard rifle 3 Positions	—N/a		560	4
Amith Kumar	300 m standard rifle 3 Positions	—N/a		559	5
Abhishek Verma	10 m air pistol	580	6 Q	219.3	3rd place, bronze medalist(s)
Saurabh Chaudhary	10 m air pistol	586	1 Q	240.7 GR	1st place, gold medalist(s)
Shivam Shukla	25 m rapid fire pistol	569	11	Did not advance	
Anish Bhanwala	25 m rapid fire pistol	576	9	Did not advance	
Lakshay Sheoran	Trap	119 (0 S-off)	4 Q	43	2nd place, silver medalist(s)
Manavjit Singh Sandhu	Trap	119 (12 S-off)	1 Q	26	4
Sheeraj Sheikh	Skeet	120	13	Did not advance	
Angadwir Bajwa	Skeet	119	14	Did not advance	
Shardul Vihaan	Double trap	141	1 Q	73	2nd place, silver medalist(s)
Ankur Mittal	Double trap	134	9	Did not advance	

Women

Athlete	Event	Qualification		Final	
Athlete	Event	Score	Rank	Score	Rank
Apurvi Chandela	10 m air rifle	629.4	2 Q	186.0	5
Elavenil Valarivan	10 m air rifle	620.8	14	Did not advance	
Anjum Moudgil	50 m rifle 3 positions	1159	9	Did not advance	
Gayathri Nithyanandam	50 m rifle 3 positions	1148	17	Did not advance	
Heena Sidhu	10 m air pistol	571	7 Q	219.2	3rd place, bronze medalist(s)
Manu Bhaker	10 m air pistol	574	3 Q	176.2	5
Manu Bhaker	25 m pistol	593	1 Q QGR	16	6
Rahi Sarnobat	25 m pistol	580	7 Q	34 (7 S-off) GR	1st place, gold medalist(s)
Seema Tomar	Trap	116 (3 S-off)	6 Q	12	6
Shreyasi Singh	Trap	116 (0 S-off)	7	Did not advance	
Shreyasi Singh	Double trap	—N/a		121	6
Varsha Varman	Double trap	—N/a		120	7
Ganemat Sekhon	Skeet	112	10	did not advance	
Rashmmi Rathore	Skeet	111	12	did not advance	

Mixed

Athlete	Event	Qualification		Final	
Athlete	Event	Score	Rank	Score	Rank
Ravi Kumar; Apurvi Chandela	10 m air rifle	835.3	2 Q	429.9	3rd place, bronze medalist(s)
Abhishek Verma; Manu Bhaker	10 m air pistol	759	6	Did not advance	
Lakshay Sheoran; Shreyasi Singh	Trap	142	5 Q	16	6

== Sport climbing ==
Speed

Athlete	Event	Qualification		Round of 16	Quarterfinal	Semifinal	Final	
Athlete	Event	Time	Rank	Opposition Time	Opposition Time	Opposition Time	Opposition Time	Rank
Chingkheinganba Maibam	Men's speed	7.53	16 Q	Zhong Qx (CHN); L −0.715	Did not advance			12
Bharath Pereira	Men's speed	8.36	21	Did not advance				
Shreya Nankar	Women's speed	14.58	19	Did not advance				

Combined

Athlete	Event	Speed Qualification		Bouldering Qualification		Lead Qualification			Points	Final			
Athlete	Event	Time	Points	Result	Points	Hold Reached	Time	Points	Points	Speed	Bouldering	Lead	Rank
Chingkheinganba Maibam	Men's combined	7.199	7	0T 3z	16	24	1:47	15	1680	did not advance			16
Bharath Pereira	Men's combined	6.996	4	1T 3z	9	23+	1:34	16	576	did not advance			10
Shreya Nankar	Women's combined	14.46	17	1T 1z	17	18	1:53	18	5202	did not advance			17

== Squash ==
The Squash Racquet Federation of India announced a team of the following 8 members for the games:

Men

Athlete	Event	Round of 32	Round of 16	Quarterfinals	Semifinals	Final	Rank
Athlete	Event	Opposition Score	Opposition Score	Opposition Score	Opposition Score	Opposition Score	Rank
Saurav Ghosal	Men's singles	Wakeel (SRI); W 3–0	Aslam (PAK); W 3–1	Sandhu (IND); W 3–1	Leo A (HKG); L 2–3	did not advance	3rd place, bronze medalist(s)
Harinder Pal Sandhu	Men's singles	Ko Y-j (KOR); W 3–0	Garcia (PHI); W 3–1	Ghosal (IND); L 1–3	did not advance		
Joshna Chinappa	Women's singles	Bye	Aribado (PHI); W 3–0	Chan (HKG); W 3–1	Subramaniam (MAS); L 1–3	did not advance	3rd place, bronze medalist(s)
Dipika Pallikal	Women's singles	Bye	Rohmah (INA); W 3–0	Kobayashi (JPN); W 3–0	David (MAS); L 0–3	did not advance	3rd place, bronze medalist(s)

Team

Athlete	Event	Group stage						Semifinals	Final	Rank
Athlete	Event	Opposition Score	Opposition Score	Opposition Score	Opposition Score	Opposition Score	Rank	Opposition Score	Opposition Score	Rank
Saurav Ghosal; Harinder Pal Sandhu; Ramit Tandon; Mahesh Mangaonkar	Men's team	Indonesia (INA); W 3–0	Singapore (SIN); W 3–0	Qatar (QAT); W 2–1	Thailand (THA); W 3–0	Malaysia (MAS); L 1–2	2 Q	Hong Kong (HKG); L 0–2	did not advance	3rd place, bronze medalist(s)
Dipika Pallikal; Joshna Chinappa; Tanvi Khanna; Sunayna Kuruvilla	Women's team	Iran (IRN); W 3–0	Thailand (THA); W 3–0	Indonesia (INA); W 3–0	China (CHN); W 3–0	Hong Kong (HKG); L 1–2	2 Q	Malaysia (MAS); W 2–0	Hong Kong (HKG); L 0–2	2nd place, silver medalist(s)

== Table tennis ==
The Table Tennis Federation of India (TTFI) announced the list of the following players for the Asian Games to be held in Jakarta, Indonesia:

Singles & Mixed Doubles

Athlete	Event	Round of 64	Round of 32	Round of 16	Quarterfinal	Semifinal	Final	
Athlete	Event	Opposition Score	Opposition Score	Opposition Score	Opposition Score	Opposition Score	Opposition Score	Rank
Sathiyan Gnanasekaran	Men's singles	Bye	Santoso (INA); W 4–2	Matsudaira (JPN); L 1–4	did not advance			
Sharath Kamal	Men's singles	Bye	Qureshi (PAK); W 4–0	Chuang C-y (TPE); L 2–4	did not advance			
Manika Batra	Women's singles	Bye	Komwong (THA); W 4–0	Wang My (CHN); L 1–4	did not advance			
Mouma Das	Women's singles	Bye	Chen S-y (TPE); L 0–4	did not advance				
Sharath Kamal; Manika Batra	Mixed doubles	—N/a	Choong / Lyne (MAS); W 3–0	Lee S-s / Jeon J-h (KOR); W 3–2	An J-s / Cha H-s (PRK); W 3–2	Wang Cq / Sun Ys (CHN); L 1–4	Did not advance	3rd place, bronze medalist(s)
Anthony Amalraj; Madhurika Patkar	Mixed doubles	—N/a	Aji / Indriani (INA); W 3–1	Ho K K / Lee H C (HKG); L 1–3	did not advance			

Team

Athlete	Event	Preliminary Round					Quarterfinal	Semifinal	Final	
Athlete	Event	Opposition Score	Opposition Score	Opposition Score	Opposition Score	Rank	Opposition Score	Opposition Score	Opposition Score	Rank
Sathiyan Gnanasekaran; Sharath Kamal; Anthony Amalraj; Harmeet Desai; Manav Thakkar	Men's team	United Arab Emirates (UAE); W 3–0	Chinese Taipei (TPE); L 2–3	Macau (MAC); W 3–0	Vietnam (VIE); W 3–0	2 Q	Japan (JPN); W 3–1	South Korea (KOR); L 0–3	Did not advance	3rd place, bronze medalist(s)
Manika Batra; Mouma Das; Madhurika Patkar; Sutirtha Mukherjee; Ayhika Mukherjee	Women's team	Qatar (QAT); W 3–0	China (CHN); L 0–3	Iran (IRI); W 3–1	—N/a	2 Q	Hong Kong (HKG); L 1–3	did not advance		

== Taekwondo ==
Athlete	Event	Round of 32	Round of 16	Quarterfinal	Semifinal	Final	
Athlete	Event	Opposition Score	Opposition Score	Opposition Score	Opposition Score	Opposition Score	Rank
Navjeet Maan	Men's 80 kg	Phommavanh (LAO); W 32–18	Chen Ll (CHN); L 6–20	Did not advance			
Akshay Kumar	Men's +80 kg	—N/a	Fernando (SRI); W 13–8	Shokin (UZB); L 1–15	did not advance		
Latika Bhandari	Women's 53 kg	Bye	Law S Y (HKG); L 22–24	did not advance			
Kashish Malik	Women's 57 kg	Bye	Farah (MAS); W 28–10	Lee A-r (KOR); L 8–17	did not advance		
Rodali Barua	Women's +67 kg	—N/a	Ma T-h (TPE); L 0–5	did not advance			
Anamika Walia; Mamta Shah; Shilpa Thapa	Women's Team	—N/a	Thailand (THA); L 7.380–8.270	did not advance			

== Tennis – Lawn tennis ==
The All India Tennis Federation announced a 12-member team as follows:

Singles

Athlete	Event	Round 1	Round 2	Round 3	Quarter-final	Semi-final	Final	Rank
Athlete	Event	Opposition Score	Opposition Score	Opposition Score	Opposition Score	Opposition Score	Opposition Score	Rank
Prajnesh Gunneswaran	Men's singles	Bye	Rifqi (INA); W 6–2, 6–0	Ly H N (VIE); W 6–3, 5–7, 6–4	Kwon S-w (KOR); W 6–7^{(2–7)}, 6–4, 7–6^{(10–8)}	Istomin (UZB); L 2–6, 2–6	Did not advance	3rd place, bronze medalist(s)
Ramkumar Ramanathan	Men's singles	Bye	Wong H-k (HKG); W 6–0, 7–6^{(7–4)}	Karimov (UZB); L 6–3, 4–6, 3–6	did not advance			
Ankita Raina	Women's singles	Bye	Gumulya (INA); W 6–2, 6–4	Hozumi (JPN); W 6–1, 6–2	Chong (HKG); W 6–4, 6–1	Zhang S (CHN); L 4–6, 6–7^{(6–8)}	Did not advance	3rd place, bronze medalist(s)
Karman Kaur Thandi	Women's singles	Bye	Altansaranai (MGL); W 6–1, 6–0	Liang E-s (TPE); L 6–2, 4–6, 6–7^{(4–7)}	did not advance			

Doubles

Athlete	Event	Round 1	Round 2	Round 3	Quarter-final	Semi-final	Final	Rank
Athlete	Event	Opposition Score	Opposition Score	Opposition Score	Opposition Score	Opposition Score	Opposition Score	Rank
Ramkumar Ramanathan; Sumit Nagal	Men's doubles	Bye	Bajracharya / Bastola (NEP); W 6–1, 6–1	Chen T / Peng H-y (TPE); W 7–6^{(7–5)}, 7–6^{(7–2)}	Bublik / Yevseyev (KAZ); L 7–5, 4–6, [2–10]	did not advance		
Rohan Bopanna; Divij Sharan	Men's doubles	Bye	D Susanto / I Susanto (INA); W 6–3, 6–3	Kadchapanan / Trongcharoenchaikul (THA); W 6–3, 6–1	Hsieh C-p / Yang T-h (TPE); W 6–3, 5–7, [10–1]	Uesugi / Shimabukuro (JPN); W 4–6, 6–3, [10–8]	Bublik / Yevseyev (KAZ); W 6–3, 6–4	1st place, gold medalist(s)
Pranjala Yadlapalli; Rutuja Bhosale	Women's doubles	—N/a	Lertpitaksinchai / Plipuech (THA); L 6–3, 4–6, [9–11]	did not advance				
Ankita Raina; Prarthana Thombare	Women's doubles	—N/a	Khan / Suhail (PAK); W 6–0, 6–0	Ainitdinova / Danilina (KAZ); L 1–6, 3–6	did not advance			
Divij Sharan; Karman Kaur Thandi	Mixed doubles	Bye	Capadocia / Lim (PHI); W 6–4, 6–4	Danilina / Nedovyesov (KAZ); L 4–6, 6–3, [5–10]	did not advance			
Rohan Bopanna; Ankita Raina	Mixed doubles	Bye	Kim N-r / Lee J-m (KOR); W 6–3, 2–6, [11–9]	Chong / Wong C-h (HKG); W 6–4, 6–4	Sutjiadi / Rungkat (INA); L 4–6, 6–1, [6–10]	did not advance		

== Tennis – Soft tennis ==
Singles

Athlete	Event	Preliminary Round				Quarterfinal	Semifinal	Final	
Athlete	Event	Opposition Score	Opposition Score	Opposition Score	Rank	Opposition Score	Opposition Score	Opposition Score	Rank
Jay Meena	Men's singles	Sophorn (CAM); W 4–3	Uayporn (THA); L 1–4	—N/a	2	did not advance			
Jitender Mehlda	Men's singles	Chen T-w (TPE); L 1–4	Ri C-i (PRK); L 2–4	—N/a	3	did not advance			
Abhilasha Mehra	Women's singles	Aliya (LAO); W 4–1	Bulgan (MGL); L 2–4	Yu Yy (CHN); L 2–4	3	did not advance			
Namita Seth	Women's singles	Pitri (INA); L 0–4	Mariyan (CAM); L 3–4	—N/a	3	did not advance			

Team

Athlete	Event	Preliminary Round				Quarterfinal	Semifinal	Final	
Athlete	Event	Opposition Score	Opposition Score	Opposition Score	Rank	Opposition Score	Opposition Score	Opposition Score	Rank
Jay Meena; Jitender Mehlda; Rohit Dhiman; Aniket Patel	Men's team	Cambodia (CAM); L 0–3	Indonesia (INA); L 0–3	Japan (JPN); L 0–3	4	did not advance			
Abhilasha Mehra; Namita Seth; Saayana Prakash; Shubh Gulati	Women's team	Mongolia (MGL); W 3–0	South Korea (KOR); L 0–3	Thailand (THA); L 0–3	3	did not advance			
Rohit Dhiman; Aadhya Tiwari	Mixed doubles	Yu K-w / Cheng C-l (TPE); L 0–5	Xaiyalin / Champamanivong (LAO); L 3–5	—N/a	3	did not advance			
Aniket Patel; Namita Seth	Mixed doubles	Altankhuyag / Munguntsetseg (MGL); W 5–0	Uematsu / Hayashida (JPN); L 0–5	—N/a	2	did not advance			

== Volleyball ==
=== Indoor volleyball ===
Team	Event	Group stage		Playoffs	Quarterfinals / Pl.	Semifinals / Pl.	Final / BM / Pl.	
Team	Event	Oppositions Scores	Rank	Opposition Score	Opposition Score	Opposition Score	Opposition Score	Rank
India men	Men's tournament	Hong Kong: W 3–0; Qatar: L 0–3; Maldives: W 3–0	2 Q	Japan; L 1–3	Pakistan; L 1–3	Did not advance	Myanmar; L 2–3	12
India women	Women's tournament	South Korea: L 0–3; Vietnam: L 0–3; Kazakhstan: L 0–3; Chinese Taipei: L 2–3; China: L 0–3	6	did not advance		Hong Kong; W 3–0	Chinese Taipei; L 0–3	10

==== Men's competition ====
Roster

The following is the India roster in the men's volleyball tournament of the 2019 Asian Games.

Head coach: Bir Yadav

No.	Name	Date of birth	Height	Weight	Spike	Block	Club
1	Ammal Akhin	24 March 1991	2.05 m (6 ft 9 in)	95 kg (209 lb)	353 cm (139 in)	335 cm (132 in)	
2	Amit Balwan Singh	25 April 1998	1.98 m (6 ft 6 in)	77 kg (170 lb)	350 cm (140 in)	322 cm (127 in)	
3	Prabakaran Pattani	5 July 1995	1.75 m (5 ft 9 in)	65 kg (143 lb)	302 cm (119 in)	280 cm (110 in)	
4	Ranjit Singh	19 July 1993	1.91 m (6 ft 3 in)	95 kg (209 lb)	329 cm (130 in)	312 cm (123 in)	
6	Pankaj Sharma	8 May 1993	1.95 m (6 ft 5 in)	79 kg (174 lb)	340 cm (130 in)	323 cm (127 in)	
7	Vinit Kumar	25 February 1991	1.97 m (6 ft 6 in)	83 kg (183 lb)	348 cm (137 in)	326 cm (128 in)	
8	Ajithlal Chandran	14 February 1996	1.93 m (6 ft 4 in)	70 kg (150 lb)	347 cm (137 in)	316 cm (124 in)	
9	Kamlesh Khatik	31 March 1997	1.82 m (6 ft 0 in)	82 kg (181 lb)	398 cm (157 in)	391 cm (154 in)	
10	Rohit Kumar	5 January 1999	1.96 m (6 ft 5 in)	86 kg (190 lb)	350 cm (140 in)	327 cm (129 in)	
12	Jerome Charles	26 June 1992	1.98 m (6 ft 6 in)	93 kg (205 lb)	345 cm (136 in)	325 cm (128 in)	
13	Prabagaran	3 November 1988	1.92 m (6 ft 4 in)	78 kg (172 lb)	348 cm (137 in)	320 cm (130 in)	
14	Karthik Ashok	24 January 1995	1.98 m (6 ft 6 in)	80 kg (180 lb)	346 cm (136 in)	326 cm (128 in)	
16	Mohan Ukkrapandian (c)	15 May 1986	1.90 m (6 ft 3 in)	93 kg (205 lb)	335 cm (132 in)	312 cm (123 in)	
17	Gurinder Singh	5 June 1989	1.95 m (6 ft 5 in)	94 kg (207 lb)	340 cm (130 in)	320 cm (130 in)	

Pool F

Pos	Team	Pld	W	L	Pts	SW	SL	SR	SPW	SPL	SPR	Qualification
1	Qatar	3	3	0	9	9	0	MAX	225	143	1.573	Classification for 1–12
2	India	3	2	1	6	6	3	2.000	207	191	1.084	Classification for 1–12
3	Hong Kong	3	1	2	3	3	6	0.500	197	206	0.956	Classification for 13–20
4	Maldives	3	0	3	0	0	9	0.000	136	225	0.604	Classification for 13–20

Source: OCA

Date	Time		Score		Set 1	Set 2	Set 3	Set 4	Set 5	Total	Report
20 Aug	16:30	India	3–0	Hong Kong	27–25	25–22	25–19			77–66	Report
22 Aug	19:00	India	0–3	Qatar	15–25	20–25	20–25			55–75	Report
25 Aug	10:00	Maldives	0–3	India	12–25	21–25	17–25			50–75	Report
26 Aug	12:30	Japan	3–1	India	25–23	25–22	23–25	25–20		98–90	Report
28 Aug	12:30	India	1–3	Pakistan	25–21	21–25	21–25	23–25		90–96	Report
30 Aug	12:30	Myanmar	3–2	India	25–21	18–25	27–25	15–25	15–13	100–109	Report

==== Women's competition ====
Roster

The following is the India roster in the women's volleyball tournament of the 2018 Asian Games.

Head coach: G.E. Sridharan

No.	Name	Date of birth	Height	Weight	Spike	Block	Club
1	Priyanka Khedkar	1 November 1994	1.69 m (5 ft 7 in)	64 kg (141 lb)	260 cm (100 in)	252 cm (99 in)	
2	Aswathi Raveendran	25 June 1997	1.62 m (5 ft 4 in)	65 kg (143 lb)	268 cm (106 in)	263 cm (104 in)	
3	Rekha Sreesailam	4 October 1992	1.74 m (5 ft 9 in)	61 kg (134 lb)	286 cm (113 in)	273 cm (107 in)	
5	Anju Balakrishnan	10 May 1995	1.79 m (5 ft 10 in)	65 kg (143 lb)	297 cm (117 in)	285 cm (112 in)	
6	Soorya	16 December 1998	1.84 m (6 ft 0 in)	63 kg (139 lb)	309 cm (122 in)	287 cm (113 in)	
7	Jini Kovat Shaji	10 September 1996	1.73 m (5 ft 8 in)	64 kg (141 lb)	288 cm (113 in)	271 cm (107 in)	
9	Ruksana Khatun	10 March 1994	1.69 m (5 ft 7 in)	67 kg (148 lb)	278 cm (109 in)	270 cm (110 in)	
10	Nirmal Tanwar	29 September 1996	1.79 m (5 ft 10 in)	70 kg (150 lb)	275 cm (108 in)	264 cm (104 in)	
11	Sruthi Murali	7 November 1994	1.73 m (5 ft 8 in)	67 kg (148 lb)	298 cm (117 in)	285 cm (112 in)	
12	Aswani Kandoth	17 June 1996	1.79 m (5 ft 10 in)	67 kg (148 lb)	296 cm (117 in)	277 cm (109 in)	
14	Anusri Ghosh	9 October 1994	1.84 m (6 ft 0 in)	78 kg (172 lb)	282 cm (111 in)	275 cm (108 in)	
15	Anjali Babu	8 May 1997	1.78 m (5 ft 10 in)	57 kg (126 lb)	298 cm (117 in)	278 cm (109 in)	
16	Minimol Abraham (c)	27 March 1988	1.85 m (6 ft 1 in)	76 kg (168 lb)	306 cm (120 in)	282 cm (111 in)	
17	Anusree Kambrath Poyilil	8 October 1997	1.79 m (5 ft 10 in)	65 kg (143 lb)	290 cm (110 in)	271 cm (107 in)	

Pool B

Pos	Team	Pld	W	L	Pts	SW	SL	SR	SPW	SPL	SPR	Qualification
1	China	5	5	0	15	15	0	MAX	375	216	1.736	Quarterfinals
2	South Korea	5	4	1	12	12	4	3.000	382	299	1.278	Quarterfinals
3	Kazakhstan	5	2	3	7	9	10	0.900	386	406	0.951	Quarterfinals
4	Vietnam	5	2	3	6	8	11	0.727	369	406	0.909	Quarterfinals
5	Chinese Taipei	5	2	3	4	7	13	0.538	370	441	0.839	Classification for 9–11
6	India	5	0	5	1	2	15	0.133	292	406	0.719	Classification for 9–11

Source: OCA

Date	Time		Score		Set 1	Set 2	Set 3	Set 4	Set 5	Total	Report
19 Aug	16:30	South Korea	3–0	India	25–17	25–11	25–13			75–41	Report
21 Aug	10:00	India	0–3	Vietnam	18–25	22–25	13–25			53–75	Report
23 Aug	10:00	Kazakhstan	3–0	India	25–8	25–19	25–23			75–50	Report
25 Aug	19:00	India	2–3	Chinese Taipei	25–23	21–25	25–18	18–25	13–15	102–106	Report
27 Aug	12:00	China	3–0	India	25–18	25–19	25–9			75–46	Report
29 Aug	16:30	Hong Kong	0–3	India	18–25	16–25	13–25			47–75	Report
31 Aug	09:00	Chinese Taipei	3–0	India	25–21	25–16	25–15			75–52	Report

== Weightlifting ==
Athlete	Event	Snatch		Clean & Jerk		Total	Rank
Athlete	Event	Result	Rank	Result	Rank	Total	Rank
Sathish Sivalingam	Men's 77 kg	144	9	170	11	314	10
Ajay Singh	Men's 77 kg	145	8	182	4	327	5
Vikas Thakur	Men's 94 kg	145	9	190	6	335	8
Rakhi Halder	Women's 63 kg	NM		―		DNF	

== Wrestling ==
Wrestling Federation of India announced the list of the following wrestlers for the Jakarta Games:

Key:

- VT – Victory by Fall.
- PP – Decision by Points – the loser with technical points.
- PO – Decision by Points – the loser without technical points.
- ST – Technical superiority – the loser without technical points and a margin of victory of at least 10 points.
- SP – Technical superiority – the loser with technical points and a margin of victory of at least 10 points.
- VB – Victory by Injury
- VC – Victory due to 3 cautions

Men

Freestyle

Athlete	Event	Round of 32	Round of 16	Quarterfinals	Semifinals	Repechage 1	Repechage 2	Final/BM	Rank
Athlete	Event	Opposition Result	Opposition Result	Opposition Result	Opposition Result	Opposition Result	Opposition Result	Opposition Result	Rank
Sandeep Tomar	57 kg	—N/a	Nazarov (TKM); W 3–1 ^{PP}	Atri (IRI); L 1–3 ^{PP}	Did not advance				10
Bajrang Punia	65 kg	—N/a	Khasanov (UZB); W 4–1 ^{SP}	Fayziev (TJK); W 4–1 ^{SP}	Batchuluun (MGL); W 4–0 ^{ST}	—N/a		Takatani (JPN); W 3–1 ^{PP}	1st place, gold medalist(s)
Sushil Kumar	74 kg	Batirov (BRN); L 1–3 ^{PP}	Did not advance						14
Pawan Kumar	86 kg	—N/a	Heng (CAM); W 5–0 ^{VT}	Yazdani (IRI); L 0–4 ^{ST}	Did not advance	—N/a	Fahriansyah (INA); W 4–0 ^{ST}	Üitümen (MGL); L 1–3 ^{PP}	5
Mausam Khatri	97 kg	—N/a	Bye	Ibragimov (UZB); L 0–3 ^{PO}	Did not advance				10
Sumit Malik	125 kg	—N/a	Hadi (IRI); L 0–4 ^{ST}	Did not advance		—N/a	Bołtin (KAZ); W 3–0 ^{PO}	Modzmanashvili (UZB); L 0–3 ^{PO}	5

Greco-Roman

Athlete	Event	Round of 16	Quarterfinals	Semifinals	Repechage 2	Final/BM	Rank
Athlete	Event	Opposition Result	Opposition Result	Opposition Result	Opposition Result	Opposition Result	Rank
Gyanender Dahiya	60 kg	Wiratul (THA); W 4–1 ^{SP}	Bakhramov (UZB); L 0–3 ^{PO}	Did not advance			8
Manish Kundu	67 kg	Shimoyamada (JPN); W 3–1 ^{PP}	Kebispayev (KAZ); L 0–4 ^{ST}	Did not advance	Hung Y-h (TPE); L 0–5 ^{VB}	Did not advance	8
Gurpreet Singh	77 kg	Natal (THA); W 4–0 ^{ST}	Geraei (IRI); L 1–3 ^{PP}	Did not advance	Yang B (CHN); L 0–5 ^{VC}	Did not advance	8
Harpreet Singh	87 kg	Park H-g (KOR); W 3–1 ^{PP}	Masato (JPN); W 4–0 ^{ST}	Assakalov (UZB); L 0–4 ^{ST}	Bye	Kustubayev (KAZ); L 1–3 ^{PP}	5
Hardeep Singh	97 kg	Bye	Xiao D (CHN); L 1–3 ^{PP}	Did not advance	Turdiev (UZB); L 1–3 ^{PP}	Did not advance	7
Naveen Sevlia	130 kg	Meng Lz (CHN); L 1–3 ^{PP}	Did not advance				8

Women

Freestyle

Athlete	Event	Round of 16	Quarterfinals	Semifinals	Repechage 2	Final/BM	Rank
Athlete	Event	Opposition Result	Opposition Result	Opposition Result	Opposition Result	Opposition Result	Rank
Vinesh Phogat	50 kg	Sun Yn (CHN); W 3–1 ^{PP}	Kim H-j (KOR); W 4–0 ^{ST}	Yakhshimuratova (UZB); W 4–0 ^{ST}	—N/a	Irie (JPN); W 3–1 ^{PP}	1st place, gold medalist(s)
Pinki	53 kg	Sumiyaa (MGL); L 0–4 ^{ST}	Did Not Advance				13
Pooja Dhanda	57 kg	Sookdongyor (THA); W 4–0 ^{ST}	Esenbaeva (UZB); W 4–1 ^{SP}	Jong M-s (PRK); L 0–4 ^{ST}	Bye	Sakagami (JPN); L 1–3 ^{PP}	5
Sakshi Malik	62 kg	Srisombat (THA); W 4–0 ^{ST}	Kassymova (KAZ); W 4–0 ^{ST}	Tynybekova (KGZ); L 1–3 ^{PP}	Bye	Rim J-s (PRK); L 1–4 ^{SP}	5
Divya Kakran	68 kg	Bye	Sharkhuu (MGL); L 1–4 ^{SP}	Did not advance	Bye	Chen W-l (TPE); W 4–0 ^{ST}	3rd place, bronze medalist(s)
Kiran Bishnoi	76 kg	Bye	Kyzy (KGZ); L 1–3 ^{PP}	Did not advance			8

== See also ==
- India at the 2018 Asian Para Games
