= Bridge at the 2018 Asian Games – Men's pair =

Men's pair at the 2018 Asian Games
- Venue: Jakarta International Expo
- Dates: 28 August – 1 September 2018
- Competitors: 68 from 12 nations

Medalists
gold medal	Pranab Bardhan; Shibhnath Sarkar	India
silver medal	Yang Lixin; Chen Gang	China
bronze medal	Henky Lasut; Freddy Eddy Manoppo	Indonesia
bronze medal	Mak Kwok Fai; Lai Wai Kit	Hong Kong

The contract bridge men's pair competition at the 2018 Asian Games was held at the Jakarta International Expo, Jakarta, Indonesia from 28 August to 1 September 2018.

== Schedule ==
All times are Western Indonesia Time (UTC+07:00)

Date	Time	Event
Tuesday, 28 August 2018	10:00	Qualification round 1
Tuesday, 28 August 2018	14:30	Qualification round 2
Wednesday, 29 August 2018	10:00	Qualification round 3
Wednesday, 29 August 2018	14:30	Qualification round 4
Thursday, 30 August 2018	10:00	Semifinals 1
Thursday, 30 August 2018	14:30	Semifinals 2
Friday, 31 August 2018	09:30	Semifinals 3
Friday, 31 August 2018	14:30	Finals 1
Saturday, 1 September 2018	10:00	Finals 2

== Results ==
Legend

- DNS — Did not start

=== Qualification round ===
Rank	Team	Session				Total
Rank	Team	1	2	3	4	Total
1	Yang Lixin / Chen Gang (CHN)	432.0	536.0	391.9	403.0	1762.9
2	Mak Kwok Fai / Lai Wai Kit (HKG)	438.0	498.4	343.5	443.0	1722.9
3	Poon Hua / Loo Choon Chou (SGP)	394.0	444.4	386.5	497.0	1721.9
4	Kazuo Furuta / Hiroki Yokoi (JPN)	363.0	422.0	411.1	458.3	1654.4
5	Pranab Bardhan / Shibhnath Sarkar (IND)	402.0	432.0	397.1	416.0	1647.1
6	Ng Chi Cheung / Lau Pik Kin (HKG)	367.0	445.0	419.5	401.0	1632.5
7	Sumit Mukherjee / Debabrata Majumder (IND)	363.0	432.0	446.1	381.0	1622.1
8	Franky Steven Karwur / Jemmy Boyke Bojoh (INA)	362.0	463.5	363.9	432.1	1621.5
9	Tadashi Teramoto / Shugo Tanaka (JPN)	454.0	442.1	385.1	324.0	1605.2
10	Ju Chuancheng / Shi Zhengjun (CHN)	357.0	456.0	374.9	397.7	1585.6
11	Singsan Phromyothi / Wanchai Danwachira (THA)	331.0	442.0	372.5	381.0	1526.5
12	Wang Shao-yu / Liu Ming-chien (TPE)	350.0	357.8	388.9	408.5	1505.2
13	Ho Wai Lam / Ho Hoi Tung (HKG)	400.0	459.0	348.2	293.0	1500.2
14	Fong Kien Hoong / Zhang Yukun (SGP)	384.0	391.0	372.9	331.0	1478.9
15	Henky Lasut / Freddy Eddy Manoppo (INA)	404.0	358.0	385.1	324.0	1471.1
16	Chen Li-jen / Lin Po-yi (TPE)	363.0	411.5	331.9	354.3	1460.7
17	Zhuang Zejun / Shi Haojun (CHN)	329.0	408.4	354.9	364.0	1456.3
18	Kasemsuk Koomtako / Chongchana Chantamas (THA)	343.0	412.0	387.8	313.1	1455.9
19	Alberto Quiogue / Joseph Maliwat (PHI)	329.0	424.0	411.1	280.0	1444.1
20	Mohammed Salahuddin / Nurul Huda Shamsuzzaman (BAN)	380.0	313.0	390.9	350.0	1433.9
21	Subhash Gupta / Sapan Desai (IND)	349.0	393.0	370.2	313.0	1425.2
22	Farrukh Liaqat / Gulzar Ahmed Bilal (PAK)	296.0	357.0	341.6	425.0	1419.6
23	Santoso Sie / Agus Kustrijanto (INA)	359.0	361.5	365.1	320.0	1405.6
24	Omar Bajunaid / Abdelhakim Sahab (KSA)	419.0	350.0	249.1	386.0	1404.1
25	Syed Nadir Ali Shah / Asadullah Khan (PAK)	318.0	387.0	369.1	327.0	1401.1
26	Vithaya Viriyamontchai / Kirawat Limsinsopon (THA)	328.0	369.0	304.9	389.5	1391.4
27	Wu Tzu-lin / Lin Ying-yi (TPE)	376.0	418.0	248.4	343.0	1385.4
28	Desmond Oh / Kelvin Ong (SGP)	327.0	398.0	332.1	321.3	1378.4
29	Masayuki Tanaka / Hiroshi Kaku (JPN)	321.0	393.0	322.4	330.0	1366.4
30	Assad Maqbool / Ghalib Ali Bandesha (PAK)	328.0	415.0	376.6	227.4	1347.0
31	Allen Tan / George Soo (PHI)	276.0	402.0	325.6	329.0	1332.6
32	Andrew Falcon / Eleazar Cabanilla (PHI)	361.0	279.0	307.1	298.0	1245.1
33	Ibrahim Al-Ahdal / Hussamuddin Sallout (KSA)	349.0	270.0	300.9	298.5	1218.4
—	Dewan Mohammad Hanzala / Sayeed Ahmed (BAN)					DNS

=== Semifinals ===
Rank	Team	Carry over	Session			Total
Rank	Team	Carry over	1	2	3	Total
1	Yang Lixin / Chen Gang (CHN)	316.0	331.0	367.0	171.2	1185.2
2	Ju Chuancheng / Shi Zhengjun (CHN)	284.0	290.0	383.0	165.8	1122.8
3	Zhuang Zejun / Shi Haojun (CHN)	261.0	284.0	422.0	150.4	1117.4
4	Sumit Mukherjee / Debabrata Majumder (IND)	290.0	324.0	352.0	142.2	1108.2
5	Pranab Bardhan / Shibhnath Sarkar (IND)	295.0	237.0	385.0	183.6	1100.6
6	Ho Wai Lam / Ho Hoi Tung (HKG)	262.5	288.0	305.0	237.9	1093.4
7	Ng Chi Cheung / Lau Pik Kin (HKG)	292.0	258.0	350.0	192.6	1092.6
8	Wang Shao-yu / Liu Ming-chien (TPE)	269.0	256.0	394.0	171.1	1090.1
9	Poon Hua / Loo Choon Chou (SGP)	308.0	269.0	364.0	145.0	1086.0
10	Mak Kwok Fai / Lai Wai Kit (HKG)	308.0	235.0	341.0	174.4	1058.4
11	Subhash Gupta / Sapan Desai (IND)	256.0	306.0	330.0	160.6	1052.6
12	Henky Lasut / Freddy Eddy Manoppo (INA)	264.0	269.0	317.0	197.6	1047.6
13	Tadashi Teramoto / Shugo Tanaka (JPN)	287.0	238.0	326.0	190.8	1041.8
14	Kasemsuk Koomtako / Chongchana Chantamas (THA)	260.0	325.0	275.0	177.8	1037.8
15	Omar Bajunaid / Abdelhakim Sahab (KSA)	251.0	292.0	294.0	178.4	1015.4
16	Kazuo Furuta / Hiroki Yokoi (JPN)	296.0	222.0	310.0	187.2	1015.2
17	Santoso Sie / Agus Kustrijanto (INA)	251.0	230.0	357.0	171.2	1009.2
18	Franky Steven Karwur / Jemmy Boyke Bojoh (INA)	290.0	282.0	285.0	143.8	1000.8
19	Fong Kien Hoong / Zhang Yukun (SGP)	265.0	262.0	336.0	122.2	985.2
20	Singsan Phromyothi / Wanchai Danwachira (THA)	274.0	195.0	289.0	194.7	952.7
21	Chen Li-jen / Lin Po-yi (TPE)	261.0	238.0	342.0	110.0	951.0
22	Alberto Quiogue / Joseph Maliwat (PHI)	258.0	272.0	250.0	135.3	915.3
23	Mohammed Salahuddin / Nurul Huda Shamsuzzaman (BAN)	257.0	219.0	272.0	138.4	886.4
24	Farrukh Liaqat / Gulzar Ahmed Bilal (PAK)	256.0	214.0	274.0	117.8	861.8

=== Finals ===
Rank	Team	Carry over	Session		Total
Rank	Team	Carry over	1	2	Total
1st place, gold medalist(s)	Pranab Bardhan / Shibhnath Sarkar (IND)	80.0	195.0	109.0	384.0
2nd place, silver medalist(s)	Yang Lixin / Chen Gang (CHN)	86.0	158.0	134.0	378.0
3rd place, bronze medalist(s)	Henky Lasut / Freddy Eddy Manoppo (INA)	76.0	138.0	160.0	374.0
3rd place, bronze medalist(s)	Mak Kwok Fai / Lai Wai Kit (HKG)	77.0	160.0	136.0	373.0
5	Ho Wai Lam / Ho Hoi Tung (HKG)	79.0	169.0	121.0	369.0
6	Ju Chuancheng / Shi Zhengjun (CHN)	81.0	149.0	134.0	364.0
7	Zhuang Zejun / Shi Haojun (CHN)	81.0	157.0	121.0	359.0
8	Wang Shao-yu / Liu Ming-chien (TPE)	79.0	143.0	129.0	351.0
9	Sumit Mukherjee / Debabrata Majumder (IND)	80.0	134.0	119.0	333.0
10	Ng Chi Cheung / Lau Pik Kin (HKG)	79.0	134.0	119.0	332.0
11	Poon Hua / Loo Choon Chou (SGP)	79.0	138.0	113.0	330.0
12	Subhash Gupta / Sapan Desai (IND)	76.0	125.0	105.0	306.0
