= Sailing at the 2018 Asian Games – Men's 49er =

Men's 49er at the 2018 Asian Games
- Venue: Ancol Beach Marina
- Date: 24–31 August 2018
- Competitors: 18 from 9 nations

Medalists
| gold medal | Shingen Furuya; Shinji Hachiyama | Japan |
| silver medal | Chae Bon-jin; Kim Dong-wook | South Korea |
| bronze medal | Varun Thakkar; K. C. Ganapathy | India |

The men's 49er competition at the 2018 Asian Games was held from 24 to 31 August 2018.

== Schedule ==
All times are Western Indonesia Time (UTC+07:00)

| Date | Time | Event |
|---|---|---|
| Friday, 24 August 2018 | 14:05 | Race 1 |
| Friday, 24 August 2018 | 15:05 | Race 2 |
| Saturday, 25 August 2018 | 12:05 | Race 3 |
| Saturday, 25 August 2018 | 13:05 | Race 4 |
| Saturday, 25 August 2018 | 13:58 | Race 5 |
| Sunday, 26 August 2018 | 12:05 | Race 6 |
| Sunday, 26 August 2018 | 13:00 | Race 7 |
| Sunday, 26 August 2018 | 14:00 | Race 8 |
| Tuesday, 28 August 2018 | 12:12 | Race 9 |
| Tuesday, 28 August 2018 | 13:05 | Race 10 |
| Tuesday, 28 August 2018 | 14:14 | Race 11 |
| Wednesday, 29 August 2018 | 12:00 | Race 12 |
| Wednesday, 29 August 2018 | 13:00 | Race 13 |
| Wednesday, 29 August 2018 | 14:17 | Race 14 |
| Friday, 31 August 2018 | 14:00 | Race 15 |

== Results ==
Legend

- DNC — Did not come to the starting area
- DNF — Did not finish
- DSQ — Disqualification
- OCS — On course side
- RDG — Redress given
- RET — Retired

| Rank | Team | Race | | | | | | | | | | | | | | | Total |
| Rank | Team | 1 | 2 | 3 | 4 | 5 | 6 | 7 | 8 | 9 | 10 | 11 | 12 | 13 | 14 | 15 | Total |
|---|---|---|---|---|---|---|---|---|---|---|---|---|---|---|---|---|---|
| 1st place, gold medalist(s) | Japan (JPN); Shingen Furuya; Shinji Hachiyama | 3 | 3 | 1 | 2 | 2 | 1 | 3 | 1 | 2 | 4 | 3 | 6 | 6 | 2 | ~~(10)~~; DNC | 39 |
| 2nd place, silver medalist(s) | South Korea (KOR); Chae Bon-jin; Kim Dong-wook | 4 | 1 | 2.5; RDG | 4 | 4 | 4 | 1 | 3 | ~~(8)~~ | 2 | 4 | 3 | 4 | 3 | 3 | 42.5 |
| 3rd place, bronze medalist(s) | India (IND); Varun Thakkar; K. C. Ganapathy | 1 | 5 | 2 | 1 | 3 | 5 | 4 | 5 | 4 | 5 | 1 | 1 | 5 | ~~(10)~~; DSQ | 1 | 43 |
| 4 | Oman (OMA); Waleed Al-Kendi; Musab Al-Hadi | 5 | 2 | 4 | 3 | 5 | 2 | 8 | 2 | 1 | 3 | ~~(10)~~; DSQ | 2 | 1 | 1 | 4 | 43 |
| 5 | Thailand (THA); Don Whitcraft; Dylan Whitcraft | ~~(8)~~ | 4 | 3 | 5 | 1 | 3 | 2 | 4 | 6 | 1 | 5 | 4 | 2 | 7 | 6 | 53 |
| 6 | Singapore (SGP); Koh Yinian; Wong Riji | 2 | ~~(8)~~ | 6 | 6 | 8 | 6 | 5 | 6 | 3 | 7 | 2 | 5 | 3 | 5 | 2 | 66 |
| 7 | Hong Kong (HKG); Cheung Ka Ho; Tse Siu Kit | 6 | 7 | 5 | 7 | 7 | 7 | 6 | 8 | 7 | 6 | 6 | 7 | 8 | 4 | ~~(10)~~; DNC | 91 |
| 8 | China (CHN); Hong Wei; Zhang Tao | 7 | 6 | ~~(10)~~; DSQ | 8 | 6 | 8 | 7 | 7 | 5 | 9 | 10; RET | 8 | 7 | 6 | 5 | 99 |
| 9 | Indonesia (INA); Alga Surya Senjaya Epriano; Ismail Abd Rahmat | ~~(10)~~; OCS | 10; DNF | 7 | 9 | 10; DNF | 9 | 9 | 9 | 9 | 8 | 7 | 9 | 9 | 8 | 10; DNF | 123 |
