= Rowing at the 2018 Asian Games – Men's quadruple sculls =

Men's quadruple sculls at the 2018 Asian Games
- Venue: Jakabaring Lake
- Date: 20–24 August 2018
- Competitors: 32 from 8 nations

Medalists
gold medal	India; Sawarn Singh, Dattu Baban Bhokanal, Om Prakash, Sukhmeet Singh
silver medal	Indonesia; Kakan Kusmana, Edwin Ginanjar Rudiana, Sulpianto, La Memo
bronze medal	Thailand; Piyapong Arnunamang, Methasit Phromphoem, Prem Nampratueng, Jaruwat Saensuk

The men's quadruple sculls competition at the 2018 Asian Games in Palembang, Indonesia was held from 20 August to 24 August at the JSC Lake.

== Schedule ==
All times are Western Indonesia Time (UTC+07:00)

Date	Time	Event
Monday, 20 August 2018	10:00	Heats
Wednesday, 22 August 2018	10:40	Repechage
Friday, 24 August 2018	09:10	Finals

== Results ==
=== Heats ===
- Qualification: 1 → Final A (FA), 2–4 → Repechage (R)

==== Heat 1 ====
Rank	Team	Time	Notes
1	India (IND); Sawarn Singh; Dattu Baban Bhokanal; Om Prakash; Sukhmeet Singh	6:15.18	FA
2	Indonesia (INA); Kakan Kusmana; Edwin Ginanjar Rudiana; Sulpianto; La Memo	6:17.56	R
3	Kazakhstan (KAZ); Yevgeniy Tatsey; Anastas Shashkov; Grigoriy Feklistov; Vitaliy Vassilyev	6:44.63	R
4	Sri Lanka (SRI); Sugath Senarathne; Budhika Chaturanga; Tharanga Rupasinghe; Udara Udawaththa	7:13.98	R

==== Heat 2 ====
Rank	Team	Time	Notes
1	Iran (IRI); Siavash Saeidi; Bahman Nassiri; Masoud Mohammadi; Mojtaba Shojaei	6:22.27	FA
2	Thailand (THA); Piyapong Arnunamang; Methasit Phromphoem; Prem Nampratueng; Jaruwat Saensuk	6:23.40	R
3	Uzbekistan (UZB); Uktamjon Davronov; Abdullo Mukhammadiev; Farrukh Astonov; Shakhboz Abdujabborov	6:32.88	R
4	South Korea (KOR); Lee Seon-soo; Son Seong-min; Jin Doo-hwa; Kang Woo-kyu	6:33.71	R

=== Repechage ===
- Qualification: 1–4 → Final A (FA), 5–6 → Final B (FB)

Rank	Team	Time	Notes
1	Indonesia (INA); Kakan Kusmana; Edwin Ginanjar Rudiana; Sulpianto; La Memo	6:25.95	FA
2	Uzbekistan (UZB); Uktamjon Davronov; Abdullo Mukhammadiev; Farrukh Astonov; Shakhboz Abdujabborov	6:29.01	FA
3	South Korea (KOR); Lee Seon-soo; Son Seong-min; Jin Doo-hwa; Kang Woo-kyu	6:30.42	FA
4	Thailand (THA); Piyapong Arnunamang; Methasit Phromphoem; Prem Nampratueng; Jaruwat Saensuk	6:39.31	FA
5	Kazakhstan (KAZ); Yevgeniy Tatsey; Anastas Shashkov; Grigoriy Feklistov; Vitaliy Vassilyev	6:51.31	FB
6	Sri Lanka (SRI); Sugath Senarathne; Budhika Chaturanga; Tharanga Rupasinghe; Udara Udawaththa	7:17.91	FB

=== Finals ===
==== Final B ====
Rank	Team	Time
1	Kazakhstan (KAZ); Yevgeniy Tatsey; Anastas Shashkov; Grigoriy Feklistov; Vitaliy Vassilyev	6:35.89
2	Sri Lanka (SRI); Sugath Senarathne; Budhika Chaturanga; Tharanga Rupasinghe; Udara Udawaththa	6:57.41

==== Final A ====
Rank	Team	Time
1st place, gold medalist(s)	India (IND); Sawarn Singh; Dattu Baban Bhokanal; Om Prakash; Sukhmeet Singh	6:17.13
2nd place, silver medalist(s)	Indonesia (INA); Kakan Kusmana; Edwin Ginanjar Rudiana; Sulpianto; La Memo	6:20.58
3rd place, bronze medalist(s)	Thailand (THA); Piyapong Arnunamang; Methasit Phromphoem; Prem Nampratueng; Jaruwat Saensuk	6:22.41
4	Uzbekistan (UZB); Uktamjon Davronov; Abdullo Mukhammadiev; Farrukh Astonov; Shakhboz Abdujabborov	6:27.06
5	Iran (IRI); Siavash Saeidi; Bahman Nassiri; Masoud Mohammadi; Mojtaba Shojaei	6:28.72
6	South Korea (KOR); Lee Seon-soo; Son Seong-min; Jin Doo-hwa; Kang Woo-kyu	6:41.92
