= Sepak takraw at the 2018 Asian Games – Men's team regu =

Men's team regu at the 2018 Asian Games
- Venue: Ranau Sports Hall
- Date: 19–22 August 2018
- Competitors: 72 from 6 nations

Medalists
gold medal	Thailand
silver medal	Malaysia
bronze medal	India
bronze medal	Indonesia

The men's team regu sepak takraw competition at the 2018 Asian Games was held at Ranau Sports Hall, Palembang, Indonesia from 19 to 22 August 2018.

== Squads ==
India	Indonesia	Iran	Malaysia
Niken Singh Khangembam; Sanjeck Singh Waikhom; Dheeraj Kumar; Jotin Singh Ngathem; Lalit Kumar; Sandeep Kumar; Seitaram Singh Thokchom; Harish Kumar; Malemnganba Sorokhaibam; Gurumayum Jiteshor Sharma; Henary Singh Wahengbam; Akash Yumnam	Mohamad Herson Saipul; Syamsul Akmal; Muhammad Hardiansyah Muliang; Rezki Yusuf Djaina; Andi Try Sandi Saputra; Nofrizal; Saiful Rijal; Husni Uba; Hendra Pago; Rizky Abdul Rahman Pago; Abdul Halim Radjiu; Victoria Eka Prasetyo	Mehrdad Jafari; Sina Rezaei; Omid Hassani; Amir Khani; Mohammad Safaei Majd; Vahid Maleki; Vahid Ebrahimi; Abdolnaser Pangh; Ehsan Amanbaei; Farshad Kaikani; Morteza Moghaddam; Hamid Reza Gervehei	Said Ezwan Said De; Noraizat Mohd Nordin; Syazreenqamar Salehan; Azlan Alias; Afifuddin Razali; Kamal Ishak; Zulkifli Abd Razak; Norhaffizi Abd Razak; Farhan Adam; Hairul Hazizi Haidzir; Aidil Aiman Azwawi; Syahir Rosdi
South Korea	Thailand		
Lee Woo-jin; Jeon Young-man; Woo Gyeong-han; Kim Young-man; Shim Jae-chul; Sin Seung-tae; Im An-soo; Lee Min-ju; Hong Seung-hyun; Hwang Yong-kwan; Lee Myung-jung; Park Cheol-hee	Anuwat Chaichana; Siriwat Sakha; Thawisak Thongsai; Pornchai Kaokaew; Pattarapong Yupadee; Assadin Wongyota; Thanawat Chumsena; Rachan Viphan; Sittipong Khamchan; Jirasak Pakbuangoen; Kritsanapong Nontakote; Jantarit Khukaeo		

== Results ==
All times are Western Indonesia Time (UTC+07:00)

=== Preliminary ===
==== Group A ====
Pos	Team	Pld	W	L	MF	MA	MD	Pts	Qualification
1	Thailand	2	2	0	6	0	+6	4	Semifinals
2	Malaysia	2	1	1	3	3	0	2	Semifinals
3	South Korea	2	0	2	0	6	−6	0	

Source: OCA

Date	Time		Score		Regu 1			Regu 2			Regu 3		
Date	Time		Score		Set 1	Set 2	Set 3	Set 1	Set 2	Set 3	Set 1	Set 2	Set 3
19 Aug	09:00	Thailand	3–0	Malaysia	2–1			2–0			2–0		
19 Aug	09:00	Thailand	3–0	Malaysia	21–10	13–21	21–17	24–22	21–11		21–14	21–12	
19 Aug	15:00	South Korea	0–3	Malaysia	1–2			0–2			0–2		
19 Aug	15:00	South Korea	0–3	Malaysia	6–21	21–18	17–21	13–21	11–21		22–24	16–21	
20 Aug	12:00	Thailand	3–0	South Korea	2–1			2–0			2–0		
20 Aug	12:00	Thailand	3–0	South Korea	21–17	19–21	21–11	21–10	21–7		21–10	21–15	

==== Group B ====
Pos	Team	Pld	W	L	MF	MA	MD	Pts	Qualification
1	Indonesia	2	2	0	6	0	+6	4	Semifinals
2	India	2	1	1	2	4	−2	2	Semifinals
3	Iran	2	0	2	1	5	−4	0	

Source: OCA

Date	Time		Score		Regu 1			Regu 2			Regu 3		
Date	Time		Score		Set 1	Set 2	Set 3	Set 1	Set 2	Set 3	Set 1	Set 2	Set 3
19 Aug	12:00	Indonesia	3–0	Iran	2–0			2–0			2–0		
19 Aug	12:00	Indonesia	3–0	Iran	21–12	21–4		22–20	21–11		21–11	21–17	
20 Aug	09:00	India	2–1	Iran	2–1			2–0			0–2		
20 Aug	09:00	India	2–1	Iran	21–16	19–21	21–17	22–20	21–13		13–21	13–21	
20 Aug	15:00	Indonesia	3–0	India	2–0			2–0			2–0		
20 Aug	15:00	Indonesia	3–0	India	21–17	21–6		21–13	21–10		21–11	21–4	

=== Knockout round ===
Semifinals
21 August
Thailand	2
India	0
21 August
Indonesia	0
Malaysia	2

Gold medal match
22 August
Thailand	2
Malaysia	0

==== Semifinals ====
Date	Time		Score		Regu 1			Regu 2			Regu 3		
Date	Time		Score		Set 1	Set 2	Set 3	Set 1	Set 2	Set 3	Set 1	Set 2	Set 3
21 Aug	15:00	Thailand	2–0	India	2–0			2–0					
21 Aug	15:00	Thailand	2–0	India	21–13	21–9		21–7	21–11				
21 Aug	15:00	Indonesia	0–2	Malaysia	0–2			1–2					
21 Aug	15:00	Indonesia	0–2	Malaysia	17–21	13–21		21–16	18–21	14–21			

==== Gold medal match ====
Date	Time		Score		Regu 1			Regu 2			Regu 3		
Date	Time		Score		Set 1	Set 2	Set 3	Set 1	Set 2	Set 3	Set 1	Set 2	Set 3
22 Aug	13:00	Thailand	2–0	Malaysia	2–0			2–0					
22 Aug	13:00	Thailand	2–0	Malaysia	21–15	21–15		21–19	21–13				
