= Ridhima =

Ridhima or Ridheema is an Indian feminine given name. It may refer to:

- Ridhima Dilawari, Indian golfer
- Ridhima Ghosh (born 1989), Indian Bengali actress
- Ridhima Pandey (born 2008), Indian environmental activist
- Ridhima Pandit (born 1990), Indian actress and model
- Ridheema Tiwari (born 1984), Indian television actress
