= Rowing at the 2018 Asian Games – Men's lightweight double sculls =

Men's lightweight double sculls at the 2018 Asian Games
- Venue: Jakabaring Lake
- Date: 20–24 August 2018
- Competitors: 14 from 7 nations

Medalists
gold medal	Masayuki Miyaura; Masahiro Takeda	Japan
silver medal	Kim Byung-hoon; Lee Min-hyuk	South Korea
bronze medal	Rohit Kumar; Bhagwan Singh	India

The men's lightweight double sculls at the 2018 Asian Games in Palembang, Indonesia was held from 20 August to 24 August at the JSC Lake.

== Schedule ==
All times are Western Indonesia Time (UTC+07:00)

Date	Time	Event
Monday, 20 August 2018	09:30	Heats
Wednesday, 22 August 2018	10:20	Repechage
Friday, 24 August 2018	09:50	Final

== Results ==
=== Heats ===
- Qualification: 1 → Final (FA), 2–4 → Repechage (R)

==== Heat 1 ====
Rank	Team	Time	Notes
1	Japan (JPN); Masayuki Miyaura; Masahiro Takeda	6:53.25	FA
2	India (IND); Rohit Kumar; Bhagwan Singh	6:57.75	R
3	Indonesia (INA); Romdhon Mardiana; Mahendra Yanto	7:12.41	R
4	United Arab Emirates (UAE); Ahmed Al-Hammadi; Mubarak Al-Yassi	7:48.08	R

==== Heat 2 ====
Rank	Team	Time	Notes
1	South Korea (KOR); Kim Byung-hoon; Lee Min-hyuk	7:02.05	FA
2	Iran (IRI); Reza Ghahramani; Amir Hossein Mahmoudpour	7:15.77	R
3	Thailand (THA); Chanin Srisomboon; Sakon Somwang	7:21.78	R

=== Repechage ===
- Qualification: 1–4 → Final (FA)

Rank	Team	Time	Notes
1	India (IND); Rohit Kumar; Bhagwan Singh	7:14.23	FA
2	Iran (IRI); Reza Ghahramani; Amir Hossein Mahmoudpour	7:21.39	FA
3	Indonesia (INA); Romdhon Mardiana; Mahendra Yanto	7:27.55	FA
4	Thailand (THA); Chanin Srisomboon; Sakon Somwang	7:39.53	FA
5	United Arab Emirates (UAE); Ahmed Al-Hammadi; Mubarak Al-Yassi	8:07.84	

=== Final ===
Rank	Team	Time
1st place, gold medalist(s)	Japan (JPN); Masayuki Miyaura; Masahiro Takeda	7:01.17
2nd place, silver medalist(s)	South Korea (KOR); Kim Byung-hoon; Lee Min-hyuk	7:03.22
3rd place, bronze medalist(s)	India (IND); Rohit Kumar; Bhagwan Singh	7:04.61
4	Indonesia (INA); Romdhon Mardiana; Mahendra Yanto	7:07.20
5	Iran (IRI); Reza Ghahramani; Amir Hossein Mahmoudpour	7:18.80
6	Thailand (THA); Chanin Srisomboon; Sakon Somwang	7:31.77
