= Rohit Kumar (rower) =

Indian rower (born 1991)

Rohit kumar
Personal information
- Nationality: Indian
- Born: 23 July 1995 (age 30) Fatehpur, Haryana, India
- Height: 186 cm (6 ft 1 in)
- Weight: 78

Sport
- Country: India
- Sport: Rowing
Medal record
Representing India
Asian Games
Bronze medal – third place	2018 Jakarta	Lightweight double sculls

Rohit Kumar is an Indian professional rower. He won the bronze medal in the men's lightweight double sculls along with his partner Bhagwan Singh in the Asian Games 2018. He is also serving in the Indian Army

== Early life ==
Rohit Kumar was born on 23 July 1996 in Fatehpur village of Ambala district, Haryana. His father is a farmer. He served in the Indian Army before starting a career in rowing.

== Career ==
He joined the army in 2012 and began rowing the same year at an army training camp in Roorkee. He won a bronze in the Asian Games 2018, in Jakarta.

Rohit Kumar won bronze at the Asian Games in 2018 paired with Bhagwan Singh.

These two scullers were selected after finishing first at the National Qualifying Regatta in Pune. He competes in men's lightweight double sculls paired with Bhagwan Singh.
