= K. C. Ganapathy =

Indian sailor

K.C. Ganapathy
Personal information
- Full name: Kelapanda Chengappa Ganapathy
- Nationality: India
- Born: 18 November 1995 (age 30)

Sailing career
- Sport: Sailing
- Class(es): 49er, 29er
Medal record
Gold medal – first place	Mussanah Open Championship (2021)	49er
Silver medal – second place	49er Asian Championship (2019)	49er
Bronze medal – third place	Asian Games 2018	49er
Gold medal – first place	Asian Sailing Championship (2017)	49er

Kelapanda Chengappa Ganapathy (born 18 November 1995) is an Indian professional sailor. He currently represents India internationally in the 49er event.

In 2018 Asian Games in Jakarta, The duo KC Ganapathy and Varun Thakkar first tasted major success when they won bronze in sailing.

== Career ==
K.C. Ganapathy made his international debut in 2010 at the Asian Sailing Championship, where he finished 8th in the Optimist event. In 2021, K.C. Ganapathy and Varun Thakkar secured the 1st Rank in the 49er Class (event) 2021 Mussanah Open Championship at Millenium Resort, Mussanah in Oman and he also Won Bronze Medal in 2018 Asian Games at Jakarta, Indonesia.

=== 2020 Summer Olympics ===
K.C. Ganapathy qualified for his debut Olympics Games 2020 in sailing after finishing 1st position in the 2021 Mussanah Open (Asia and Africa Olympic Qualifier) Tournament at Mussanah in Oman and now he will represent India Team at the Skiff – 49er Event in Sailing at the 2020 Summer Olympics of the 2020 Summer Olympics in Tokyo, Japan.

== Tournaments record ==
INTERNATIONAL EVENTS
Year	Event	Place	Position
2021	2021 Mussanah OPEN Championship	Oman Oman	1
2019	49ER World Championship 2019	Auckland New Zealand	65
2019	49ER Asian Championship 2019	Abu Dhabi United Arab Emirates	2
2018	49er European Championship 2018	Poland Poland	25
2018	Asian Games 2018	Jakarta Indonesia	3
2017	17th Asian Sailing Championship	Jakarta Indonesia	1
