= Pranab Bardhan (bridge) =

Indian bridge player

Pranab Bardan is an Indian bridge player. He won gold at the 2018 Asian Games in men's pair event with Shibhnath Sarkar. Bridge Federation of India nominated him for Arjuna Award in 2020.
