= Ridhima Dilawari =

Indian golfer

Ridhima Dilawari is an Indian golfer.

In January 2020 Dilawari won the first leg of the 2020 Hero Women's Pro Golf Tour.
