= Varun Thakkar =

Indian sailor

Personal information
- Full name: Varun Thakkar
- Nationality: India
- Born: 10 February 1995 (age 31)

Sailing career
- Sport: Sailing
- Class(es): 49er, 29er
Medal record
Gold medal – first place	Mussanah Open Championship (2021)	49er
Silver medal – second place	49er Asian Championship (2019)	49er
Bronze medal – third place	Asian Games 2018	49er
Gold medal – first place	Asian Sailing Championship (2017)	49er

Varun Thakkar (born 10 February 1995 in Tamil Nadu) is an Indian professional sailor. He is currently representing India at the international sailing events in the 49er class of the boat category.

== Career ==
In 2021, Thakkar secured the first rank at the 49er Class event in the Mussanah Open Championship 2021 at Millennium Resort, Oman. He also won a bronze medal in the 2018 Asian Games which were held in Jakarta, Indonesia.

In 2018 Asian Games in Jakarta, The duo K.C. Ganapathy and Varun Thakkar first tasted major success when they won bronze in sailing.

=== 2020 Summer Olympics ===
Varun qualified for his debut Olympic Games 2020 in sailing after achieving first place in the 2021 Mussanah Open (Asia and Africa Olympic Qualifier) Tournament in Mussanah, Oman and he will now be representing Team India at the Skiff – 49er Event in Sailing at the 2020 Summer Olympics in Tokyo, Japan.

== Tournaments Record ==
INTERNATIONAL EVENTS
Year	Event	Place	Position
2021	2021 MUSSANAH OPEN CHAMPIONSHIP	Oman Oman	1
2019	49ER WORLD CHAMPIONSHIP 2019	Auckland New Zealand	65
2019	2019 OCEANIA CHAMPIONSHIP	Auckland New Zealand	39
2019	49ER ASIAN CHAMPIONSHIP 2019	Abu Dhabi United Arab Emirates	2
2018	Asian Games 2018	Jakarta Indonesia	3
2017	17th Asian Sailing Championship	Jakarta Indonesia	1
