= Shibhnath Sarkar =

Indian bridge player

Shibhnath Sarkar is an Indian bridge player. He won gold at the 2018 Asian Games with Pranab Bardhan in the men's pair event.
