= Om Prakash (rower) =

Indian rower (born 1991)

Om Prakash Krishnia
Personal information
- Nationality: Indian
- Born: 10 March 1991 (age 35) Budana Jhunjhunu
- Height: 186 cm (6 ft 1 in)
- Weight: 78

Sport
- Country: India
- Sport: Rowing
Medal record
6×national game Medal winner 1×asian indoor rowing championship
Representing India
Asian Games
Gold medal – first place	2018 Jakarta	Men's Quadruple sculls

Om Prakash is an Indian rower. He won the gold medal in the 2018 Asian Games in Men's Quadruple sculls.
