= Harish Kumar (sepak takraw) =

Indian athlete

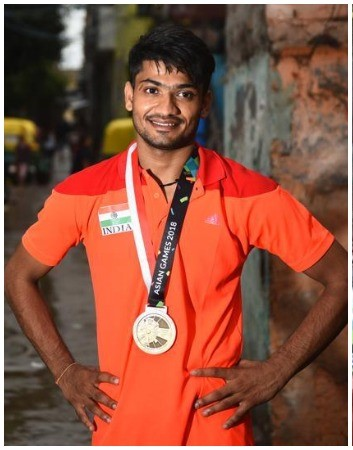
Harish Kumar wearing his bronze medal from 2018 Asian Games

Harish Kumar is an Indian athlete and a member of the Indian sepak takraw team. Kumar represented India in the 2018 Asian Games held in Jakarta and Palembang, Indonesia. Kumar was a part of the Indian sepak takraw team that secured the bronze medal at the Jakarta Palembang 2018 Asian Games.
