= Iran at the 2018 Asian Games =

- IOC code: IRI
- NOC: National Olympic Committee of the Islamic Republic of Iran

in Jakarta and Palembang
- Competitors: 370 in 35 sports
- Flag bearer: Elaheh Ahmadi
- Medals Ranked 6th: Gold 20 Silver 20 Bronze 22 Total 62

Asian Games appearances (overview)
- 1951; 1954; 1958; 1962; 1966; 1970; 1974; 1978; 1982; 1986; 1990; 1994; 1998; 2002; 2006; 2010; 2014; 2018; 2022; 2026

Iran competed in the 2018 Asian Games in Jakarta and Palembang, Indonesia from 18 August to 2 September 2018. Iran has competed at the Asian Games since the first event in 1951 Delhi, and the best achievement was in 1974, when the country hosted the event in Tehran, by ranked second with the acquisition of 36 gold, 28 silver and 17 bronze medals. At the latest edition in Incheon, the country wrapped up its campaign with 57 medals in all - 21 gold, 18 silver and 18 bronze.

Iran participated at the Games with 378 athletes. The National Olympic Committee of the Islamic Republic of Iran (NOCIRI) named the 19-year-old Iranian and bronze medalist at the 2016 Rio Olympic Games, Kimia Alizadeh, who carried the Iranian flag at the inauguration of the competitions. But within 12 days to start of the tournament, she suffered a torn ACL injury during training. Elaheh Ahmadi was confirmed to replace her.

== Competitors ==
Sport	Men	Women	Total
3x3 basketball	4	4	8
Archery	8	5	13
Athletics	10	2	12
Badminton	1	1	2
Basketball	12		12
Beach volleyball	4		4
Boxing	3		3
Canoe slalom	2	2	4
Canoe sprint	9	4	13
Cycling, Mountain bike	3	1	4
Cycling, Road	5	1	6
Cycling, Track	6		6
Diving	2		2
Equestrian	5	1	6
Fencing	7	4	11
Football	20		20
Gymnastics, Artistic	4		4
Handball	16		16
Judo	4	2	6
Ju-jitsu	8	2	10
Kabaddi	12	12	24
Karate	4	4	8
Kurash	8	4	12
Paragliding	3		3
Pencak silat	6	3	9
Rowing	8	6	14
Sailing	2		2
Sambo	2	2	4
Sepak takraw	12		12
Shooting	10	9	19
Sport climbing	4	4	8
Squash	2	3	5
Swimming	4		4
Table tennis	4	4	8
Taekwondo	8	8	16
Tennis	3	2	5
Triathlon	1		1
Volleyball	14		14
Water polo	13		13
Weightlifting	8		8
Wrestling	12		12
Wushu	4	5	9
Total	275	98	370

== Medal summary ==
=== Medal table ===
Sport	Gold	Silver	Bronze	Total
3x3 basketball			1	1
Archery			1	1
Athletics	2	1		3
Basketball		1		1
Canoe sprint		1	2	3
Fencing		1	1	2
Judo		1	1	2
Kabaddi	2			2
Karate	2	3	3	8
Kurash	1	1	2	4
Pencak silat			1	1
Rowing		3	1	4
Shooting			1	1
Sport climbing	1			1
Table tennis			1	1
Taekwondo	2	3	2	7
Volleyball	1			1
Water polo			1	1
Weightlifting	2	1	1	4
Wrestling	5		3	8
Wushu	2	4		6
Total	20	20	22	62

=== Medalists ===
Medal	Name	Sport	Event
Gold	Hossein Keyhani	Athletics	Men's 3000 m steeplechase
Gold	Ehsan Haddadi	Athletics	Men's discus throw
Gold	Fazel Atrachali; Mohammad Esmaeil Nabibakhsh; Mohammad Amin Nosrati; Hadi Oshtorak; Mohammad Mallak; Mohammad Ghorbani; Esmaeil Maghsoudloo; Meisam Abbasi; Mohsen Maghsoudloo; Abouzar Mohajer; Abolfazl Maghsoudloo; Hamid Mirzaei	Kabaddi	Men
Gold	Ghazal Khalaj; Mahboubeh Sanchouli; Farideh Zarifdoust; Saeideh Jafari; Raheleh Naderi; Roya Davoudian; Samira Atarodian; Fatemeh Karami; Azadeh Seidi; Sedigheh Jafari; Zahra Karimi; Zahra Abbasi	Kabaddi	Women
Gold	Bahman Asgari	Karate	Men's kumite 75 kg
Gold	Sajjad Ganjzadeh	Karate	Men's kumite +84 kg
Gold	Elias Aliakbari	Kurash	Men's 81 kg
Gold	Reza Alipour	Sport climbing	Men's speed
Gold	Mirhashem Hosseini	Taekwondo	Men's 63 kg
Gold	Saeid Rajabi	Taekwondo	Men's +80 kg
Gold	Milad Ebadipour; Saman Faezi; Saeid Marouf; Farhad Ghaemi; Mohammad Mousavi; Amir Ghafour; Saber Kazemi; Mohammad Javad Manavinejad; Ali Shafiei; Mohammad Taher Vadi; Mehdi Marandi; Morteza Sharifi; Mohammad Reza Hazratpour; Amir Hossein Toukhteh	Volleyball	Men
Gold	Sohrab Moradi	Weightlifting	Men's 94 kg
Gold	Behdad Salimi	Weightlifting	Men's +105 kg
Gold	Hassan Yazdani	Wrestling	Men's freestyle 86 kg
Gold	Alireza Karimi	Wrestling	Men's freestyle 97 kg
Gold	Parviz Hadi	Wrestling	Men's freestyle 125 kg
Gold	Mohammad Ali Geraei	Wrestling	Men's Greco-Roman 77 kg
Gold	Hossein Nouri	Wrestling	Men's Greco-Roman 87 kg
Gold	Erfan Ahangarian	Wushu	Men's sanda 60 kg
Gold	Mohsen Mohammadseifi	Wushu	Men's sanda 70 kg
Silver	Amir Moradi	Athletics	Men's 1500 m
Silver	Meisam Mirzaei; Sajjad Mashayekhi; Aren Davoudi; Behnam Yakhchali; Vahid Dalirzahan; Rouzbeh Arghavan; Mohammad Jamshidi; Samad Nikkhah Bahrami; Hamed Haddadi; Navid Rezaeifar; Arsalan Kazemi; Mohammad Hassanzadeh	Basketball	Men
Silver	Hedieh Kazemi	Canoe sprint	Women's K1 500 m
Silver	Mojtaba Abedini; Farzad Baher; Ali Pakdaman; Mohammad Rahbari	Fencing	Men's team sabre
Silver	Saeid Mollaei	Judo	Men's 81 kg
Silver	Amir Mehdizadeh	Karate	Men's kumite 60 kg
Silver	Taravat Khaksar	Karate	Women's kumite 55 kg
Silver	Rozita Alipour	Karate	Women's kumite 61 kg
Silver	Jafar Pahlevani	Kurash	Men's +90 kg
Silver	Nazanin Malaei	Rowing	Women's lightweight single sculls
Silver	Nazanin Rahmani; Maryam Omidi Parsa	Rowing	Women's lightweight double sculls
Silver	Maryam Karami; Mahsa Javer; Nazanin Rahmani; Maryam Omidi Parsa	Rowing	Women's lightweight quadruple sculls
Silver	Kourosh Bakhtiar	Taekwondo	Men's individual poomsae
Silver	Amir Mohammad Bakhshi	Taekwondo	Men's 68 kg
Silver	Marjan Salahshouri	Taekwondo	Women's individual poomsae
Silver	Saeid Alihosseini	Weightlifting	Men's +105 kg
Silver	Foroud Zafari	Wushu	Men's sanda 65 kg
Silver	Zahra Kiani	Wushu	Women's jianshu & qiangshu
Silver	Elaheh Mansourian	Wushu	Women's sanda 52 kg
Silver	Shahrbanoo Mansourian	Wushu	Women's sanda 60 kg
Bronze	Ali Allahverdi; Amir Hossein Azari; Navid Khajehzadeh; Mohammad Yousefvand	3x3 basketball	Men
Bronze	Nima Mahboubi; Fereshteh Ghorbani	Archery	Mixed team compound
Bronze	Mohammad Nabi Rezaei	Canoe sprint	Men's C1 1000 m
Bronze	Ahmad Reza Talebian; Peyman Ghavidel; Ali Aghamirzaei; Amin Boudaghi	Canoe sprint	Men's K4 500 m
Bronze	Ali Pakdaman	Fencing	Men's individual sabre
Bronze	Mohammad Mohammadi	Judo	Men's 73 kg
Bronze	Zabihollah Pourshab	Karate	Men's kumite 84 kg
Bronze	Pegah Zangeneh	Karate	Women's kumite 68 kg
Bronze	Hamideh Abbasali	Karate	Women's kumite +68 kg
Bronze	Ghanbar Ali Ghanbari	Kurash	Men's 66 kg
Bronze	Omid Tiztak	Kurash	Men's 81 kg
Bronze	Tahmineh Karbalaei	Pencak silat	Women's tanding 65 kg
Bronze	Maryam Karami; Parisa Ahmadi	Rowing	Women's double sculls
Bronze	Mahlagha Jambozorg	Shooting	Women's 50 m rifle 3 positions
Bronze	Noshad Alamian	Table tennis	Men's singles
Bronze	Farzan Ashourzadeh	Taekwondo	Men's 58 kg
Bronze	Nahid Kiani	Taekwondo	Women's 49 kg
Bronze	Omid Lotfpour; Peyman Asadi; Amir Hossein Rahbar; Hamed Malek-Khanbanan; Amir Hossein Keyhani; Ali Pirouzkhah; Amir Dehdari; Mehdi Yazdankhah; Soheil Rostamian; Mohammad Javad Abbasi; Arshia Almasi; Hossein Khaledi; Shayan Ghasemi	Water polo	Men
Bronze	Ali Hashemi	Weightlifting	Men's 105 kg
Bronze	Reza Atri	Wrestling	Men's freestyle 57 kg
Bronze	Mehrdad Mardani	Wrestling	Men's Greco-Roman 60 kg
Bronze	Mohammad Reza Geraei	Wrestling	Men's Greco-Roman 67 kg

== Results by event ==
=== Aquatics ===
==== Diving ====
Athlete	Event	Preliminary		Final	
Athlete	Event	Score	Rank	Score	Rank
Mojtaba Valipour	Men's 1 m springboard	302.90	9 Q	308.60	8
Shahnam Nazarpour; Mojtaba Valipour	Men's synchronized 10 m platform	—N/a		318.06	6

==== Swimming ====
Athlete	Event	Heats		Final	
Athlete	Event	Time	Rank	Time	Rank
Benyamin Gharehhassanloo	Men's 50 m freestyle	23.11	19	Did not advance	
Sina Gholampour	Men's 50 m freestyle	23.54	23	Did not advance	
Benyamin Gharehhassanloo	Men's 100 m freestyle	51.37	26	Did not advance	
Sina Gholampour	Men's 100 m freestyle	51.06	22	Did not advance	
Alireza Yavari	Men's 200 m freestyle	1:54.28	22	Did not advance	
Mehdi Ansari	Men's 50 m breaststroke	29.35	20	Did not advance	
Mehdi Ansari	Men's 50 m butterfly	24.95	20	Did not advance	
Mehdi Ansari	Men's 100 m butterfly	54.88	17	Did not advance	
Alireza Yavari	Men's 100 m butterfly	56.10	23	Did not advance	
Sina Gholampour; Benyamin Gharehhassanloo; Alireza Yavari; Mehdi Ansari	Men's 4 × 100 m freestyle relay	3:26.12	10	Did not advance	

==== Water polo ====
Team	Event	Preliminary round				Quarterfinal	Semifinal	Final	Rank
Team	Event	Round 1	Round 2	Round 3	Rank	Quarterfinal	Semifinal	Final	Rank
Iran	Men	Singapore; W 11–5	South Korea; W 16–11	Kazakhstan; L 5–9	2 Q	Saudi Arabia; W 15–7	Japan; L 7–18	3rd place match China; W 8–8 (8–7 P)	3rd place, bronze medalist(s)
Roster: Omid Lotfpour; Peyman Asadi; Amir Hossein Rahbar; Hamed Malek-Khanbanan; Amir Hossein Keyhani; Ali Pirouzkhah; Amir Dehdari; Mehdi Yazdankhah; Soheil Rostamian; Mohammad Javad Abbasi; Arshia Almasi; Hossein Khaledi; Shayan Ghasemi; Coach: (Serbia) Aleksandar Ćirić

=== Archery ===
Recurve

Athlete	Event	Ranking round		Round of 64	Round of 32	Round of 16	Quarterfinal	Semifinal	Final	Rank
Athlete	Event	Score	Rank	Round of 64	Round of 32	Round of 16	Quarterfinal	Semifinal	Final	Rank
Erfan Arjangipour	Men's individual	611	65	Did not advance						72
Sadegh Ashrafi	Men's individual	644	34 Q	Salem (QAT); L 4–6	Did not advance					33
Amin Pirali	Men's individual	634	45 Q	Al-Otaibi (KSA); L 0–6	Did not advance					33
Milad Vaziri	Men's individual	616	58	Did not advance						69
Sadegh Ashrafi; Amin Pirali; Milad Vaziri; Erfan Arjangipour	Men's team	1894	12 Q	—N/a	Bye	Malaysia; W 6–0	China; L 0–6	Did not advance		8
Zahra Nemati	Women's individual	622	31 Q	Kausar (PAK); W 6–0	Tukebayeva (KAZ); W 6–5	Choirunisa (INA); L WO	Did not advance			9
Sadegh Ashrafi; Zahra Nemati	Mixed team	1266	13 Q	—N/a	Laos; W 5–4	Japan; L 0–6	Did not advance			9

Compound

Athlete	Event	Ranking round		Round of 32	Round of 16	Quarterfinal	Semifinal	Final	Rank
Athlete	Event	Score	Rank	Round of 32	Round of 16	Quarterfinal	Semifinal	Final	Rank
Esmaeil Ebadi; Majid Gheidi; Nima Mahboubi; Amir Kazempour	Men's team	2075	4 Q	—N/a	Bhutan; W 231–217	Malaysia; L 224–232	Did not advance		7
Minoo Abedi; Parisa Baratchi; Fereshteh Ghorbani; Raheleh Farsi	Women's team	2051	4 Q	—N/a	Mongolia; W 221–203	Kazakhstan; W 224–217	South Korea; L 228–231	3rd place match Chinese Taipei; L 221–226	4
Nima Mahboubi; Fereshteh Ghorbani	Mixed team	1384	7 Q	Bye	Japan; W 152–152 (19–17 SO)	India; W 155–153	Chinese Taipei; L 138–153	3rd place match Singapore; W 155–152	3rd place, bronze medalist(s)

=== Athletics ===
Athlete	Event	Round 1		Semifinal		Final	Rank
Athlete	Event	Time	Rank	Time	Rank	Time / Result	Rank
Hassan Taftian	Men's 100 m	10.35	4 Q	10.17	3 q	10.19	6
Ali Khadivar	Men's 200 m	DNS	—	Did not advance			—
Hassan Taftian	Men's 200 m	21.25	3 Q	21.47	7	Did not advance	14
Ali Khadivar	Men's 400 m	DNF	—	Did not advance			—
Amir Moradi	Men's 800 m	1:48.31	2 Q	—N/a		1:46.55	4
Amir Moradi	Men's 1500 m	3:46.93	3 Q	—N/a		3:45.62	2nd place, silver medalist(s)
Hossein Keyhani	Men's 5000 m	—N/a				14:08.69	4
Reza Malekpour	Men's 400 m hurdles	50.99	5	—N/a		Did not advance	11
Hossein Keyhani	Men's 3000 m steeplechase	—N/a				8:22.79 GR	1st place, gold medalist(s)
Shahin Mehrdelan	Men's shot put	—N/a				No mark	—
Ali Samari	Men's shot put	—N/a				18.21 m	7
Ehsan Haddadi	Men's discus throw	—N/a				65.71 m	1st place, gold medalist(s)
Behnam Shiri	Men's discus throw	—N/a				58.09 m	4
Reza Moghaddam	Men's hammer throw	—N/a				64.67 m	9
Elham Kakoli	Women's 200 m	25.12	5	Did not advance			23
Sepideh Tavakkoli	Women's high jump	—N/a				1.75 m	7

=== Badminton ===
Athlete	Event	Round of 64	Round of 32	Round of 16	Quarterfinal	Semifinal	Final	Rank
Mehran Shahbazi	Men's singles	Bye	Ginting (INA); L 0–2 (9–21, 8–21)	Did not advance				17
Sorayya Aghaei	Women's singles	—N/a	Nehwal (IND); L 0–2 (7–21, 9–21)	Did not advance				17

=== Basketball ===
==== 3x3 ====
Athlete	Event	Preliminary round						Quarterfinal	Semifinal	Final	Rank
Athlete	Event	Round 1	Round 2	Round 3	Round 4	Round 5	Rank	Quarterfinal	Semifinal	Final	Rank
Ali Allahverdi; Amir Hossein Azari; Navid Khajehzadeh; Mohammad Yousefvand	Men	Malaysia; W 18–13	Kazakhstan; W 21–15	Iraq; W 19–16	Turkmenistan; W 21–7	Afghanistan; W 20–5	1 Q	Chinese Taipei; W 18–17	China; L 19–21	3rd place match Thailand; W 21–7	3rd place, bronze medalist(s)
Sheida Shojaei; Kimia Yazdian; Zahra Edalatkar; Nahideh Asadi	Women	Thailand; L 7–11	Kazakhstan; W 18–12	Maldives; W WO	—N/a		2 Q	China; L 7–21	Did not advance		8

==== 5x5 ====
Team	Event	Preliminary round		Quarterfinal	Semifinal	Final	Rank
Team	Event	Round 1	Rank	Quarterfinal	Semifinal	Final	Rank
Iran	Men	Syria; W 68–55	1 Q	Japan; W 93–67	South Korea; W 80–68	China; L 72–84	2nd place, silver medalist(s)
Roster: Meisam Mirzaei; Sajjad Mashayekhi; Aren Davoudi; Behnam Yakhchali; Vahid Dalirzahan; Rouzbeh Arghavan; Mohammad Jamshidi; Samad Nikkhah Bahrami; Hamed Haddadi; Navid Rezaeifar; Arsalan Kazemi; Mohammad Hassanzadeh; Coach: Mehran Shahintab

=== Boxing ===
Athlete	Event	Round of 32	Round of 16	Quarterfinal	Semifinal	Final	Rank
Omid Ahmadi Safa	Men's 49 kg	Meýleýew (TKM); W 5–0	Kim (PRK); L 2–3	Did not advance			9
Sajjad Kazemzadeh	Men's 69 kg	Bacho (PHI); W 4–1	Aramoto (JPN); W 5–0	Adi (THA); L 0–5	Did not advance		5
Shahin Mousavi	Men's 75 kg	Bye	Ghossoun (SYR); W 5–0	Madrimov (UZB); L 0–5	Did not advance		5

=== Canoeing ===
==== Slalom ====
Athlete	Event	Heats		Semifinal		Final	
Athlete	Event	Time	Rank	Time	Rank	Time	Rank
Mohammad Mehdi Konarang	Men's C1	113.80	13 Q	134.84	12 Q	176.89	8
Amir Mohammad Fattahpour	Men's K1	91.26	7 Q	100.26	8 Q	94.90	5
Shaghayegh Seyed-Yousefi	Women's C1	179.37	10 Q	277.14	8 Q	175.35	8
Roksana Razeghian	Women's K1	112.26	7 Q	138.59	7 Q	134.03	6

==== Sprint ====
Athlete	Event	Heat		Semifinal		Final	Rank
Athlete	Event	Time	Rank	Time	Rank	Time	Rank
Mohammad Nabi Rezaei	Men's C1 1000 m	—N/a				4:06.434	3rd place, bronze medalist(s)
Pejman Divsalari; Adel Mojallali	Men's C2 200 m	41.596	3 QF	Bye		38.399	4
Shahoo Nasseri; Ali Ojaghi	Men's C2 1000 m	—N/a				3:49.265	4
Ali Aghamirzaei	Men's K1 200 m	38.210	4 QS	36.838	2 Q	36.960	6
Ali Aghamirzaei; Amin Boudaghi	Men's K2 1000 m	3:38.202	3 QF	Bye		3:35.339	6
Ahmad Reza Talebian; Peyman Ghavidel; Ali Aghamirzaei; Amin Boudaghi	Men's K4 500 m	1:28.469	2 QF	Bye		1:26.217	3rd place, bronze medalist(s)
Fatemeh Karamjani; Atena Raoufi	Women's C2 500 m	—N/a				2:10.408	7
Arezoo Hakimi	Women's K1 200 m	44.170	3 QF	Bye		43.594	7
Hedieh Kazemi	Women's K1 500 m	—N/a				2:02.280	2nd place, silver medalist(s)
Hedieh Kazemi; Arezoo Hakimi	Women's K2 500 m	—N/a				1:51.655	5

=== Cycling ===
==== Mountain bike ====
Athlete	Event	Seeding run		Final	
Athlete	Event	Time	Rank	Time	Rank
Mohammad Poursharif	Men's cross-country	—N/a		1:40:48	5
Faraz Shokri	Men's cross-country	—N/a		1:37:54	4
Hossein Zanjanian	Men's downhill	2:30.962	7 Q	2:21.623	5
Faranak Partoazar	Women's cross-country	—N/a		1:29:24	4

==== Road ====
Athlete	Event	Time	Rank
Mohammad Ganjkhanloo	Men's road race	3:31:34	33
Samad Pourseyedi	Men's road race	3:26:10	14
Saeid Safarzadeh	Men's road race	3:26:00	8
Mehdi Sohrabi	Men's road race	3:31:34	32
Arvin Moazzami	Men's individual time trial	58:56.33	6
Mandana Dehghan	Women's road race	2:57:40	7
Mandana Dehghan	Women's individual time trial	35:07.01	6

==== Track ====
Sprint

Athlete	Event	Qualifying		Round of 32	Round of 16	Quarterfinal	Semifinal	Final	Rank
Athlete	Event	Time	Rank	Round of 32	Round of 16	Quarterfinal	Semifinal	Final	Rank
Mohammad Daneshvar	Men's sprint	10.306	13 Q	Bye	Wakimoto (JPN); L 0–1	Did not advance			13
Ehsan Khademi	Men's sprint	10.251	11 Q	Bye	Fukaya (JPN); L 0–1	Did not advance			11
Ali Aliasgari; Ehsan Khademi; Mohammad Daneshvar	Men's team sprint	45.324	7	—N/a				Did not advance	7

Keirin

Athlete	Event	Round 1	Repechage	Round 2	Final	Rank
Athlete	Event	Rank	Rank	Rank	Rank	Rank
Mohammad Daneshvar	Men's keirin	6	4	Did not advance		13
Ehsan Khademi	Men's keirin	4	4	Did not advance		13

Endurance

Athlete	Event	Scratch race		Tempo race		Elimination race		Points race		Total	Rank
Athlete	Event	Rank	Points	Rank	Points	Rank	Points	Rank	Points	Total	Rank
Mohammad Ganjkhanloo	Men's omnium	1	40	9	24	4	34	6	10	108	4
Mehdi Sohrabi; Mohammad Rajabloo	Men's madison	—N/a								−22 pts	8

=== Equestrian ===
Athlete	Horse	Event	Prix St-Georges		Intermediate I		Intermediate I Freestyle	
Athlete	Horse	Event	Score	Rank	Score	Rank	Technical	Artistic
Litta Soheila Sohi	Airfk	Dressage Individual	66.646	12	67.264	9	71.775	6

Athlete	Horse	Event	Dressage		Cross-Country		Jumping Final	
Athlete	Horse	Event	Score	Rank	Score	Rank	Score	Rank
Toufan Torabi	Waitangi Amazon	Eventing Individual	33.20	19	EL	–	EL	–

Athlete	Horse	Event	1st Qualification		Qualifier 1		Qualifier 2		Final - Round 1		Final - Round 2	
Athlete	Horse	Event	Score	Rank	Score	Rank	Score	Rank	Score	Rank	Score	Rank
Davood Pourrezaei	Veneurdisigny	Individual	11.64	44	15.64	34	23.64	30	35.64	26	43.64	20
Farhang Sadeghi	Quick 'N' Step	Individual	12.74	48	20.74	43	40.74	46	Did not advance			
Masoud Mokarinezhad	Cyrano D'orbri	Individual	11.26	43	28.26	52	Did not advance					
Ariana Ravanbakhsh	S I E C Cros	Individual	43.85	63	51.85	59	Did not advance					

Athletes	Horses	Event	1st Qualification		Qualifier 1		Final	
Athletes	Horses	Event	Score	Rank	Score	Rank	Score	Rank
Mokarinezhad; Pourrezaei; Ravanbakhsh; Sadeghi	Cyrano D'orbri; Veneurdisigny; S I E C Cros; Quick 'N' Step	Team	35.64	13	Did not advance			

=== Fencing ===
Épée

Athlete	Event	Pool round		Round of 32	Round of 16	Quarterfinal	Semifinal	Final	Rank
Athlete	Event	Results	Rank	Round of 32	Round of 16	Quarterfinal	Semifinal	Final	Rank
Mohammad Esmaeili	Men's individual	Chantharapidok (THA) W 5–3; Fong (HKG) L 3–4; Petrov (KGZ) L 3–5; Nguyễn (VIE) W 5–3; Kano (JPN) L 3–5	19 Q	Baudunov (KGZ); L 6–15	Did not advance				21
Mohammad Rezaei	Men's individual	Al-Hammadi (UAE) W 5–4; Dölgöön (MGL) W 5–4; Shi (CHN) L 2–5; Vag-Urminsky (CAM) W 5–4; Juengamnuaychai (THA) W 5–2; Park (KOR) L 4–5	12 Q	Alimov (UZB); L 10–15	Did not advance				18
Mojtaba Abedini; Mohammad Esmaeili; Amir Reza Kanaani; Mohammad Rezaei	Men's team	—N/a			Kyrgyzstan; W 45–44	South Korea; L 26–45	Did not advance		8

Sabre

Athlete	Event	Pool round		Round of 32	Round of 16	Quarterfinal	Semifinal	Final	Rank
Athlete	Event	Results	Rank	Round of 32	Round of 16	Quarterfinal	Semifinal	Final	Rank
Mojtaba Abedini	Men's individual	Low (HKG) L 4–5; Xu (CHN) L 1–5; Vũ (VIE) W 5–2; Putra (MAS) W 5–4; Al-Saadi (QAT) W 5–0	9 Q	Bye	Xu (CHN); W 15–6	Gu (KOR); L 12–15	Did not advance		8
Ali Pakdaman	Men's individual	Yoshida (JPN) W 5–2; Nguyễn (VIE) W 5–4; Lam (HKG) W 5–2; Salmanpour (QAT) W 5–0; Setiawan (INA) W 5–3	2 Q	Bye	Lam (HKG); W 15–10	Vũ (VIE); W 15–11	Oh (KOR); L 14–15	Did not advance	3rd place, bronze medalist(s)
Mojtaba Abedini; Farzad Baher; Ali Pakdaman; Mohammad Rahbari	Men's team	—N/a			Bye	Indonesia; W 45–21	China; W 45–43	South Korea; L 32–45	2nd place, silver medalist(s)
Faezeh Rafiei	Women's individual	Yoon (KOR) L 1–5; Permatasari (INA) L 3–5; Chhay (CAM) W 5–3; Fukushima (JPN) L 3–5; Thapa (NEP) W 5–0	15 Q	Bye	Qian (CHN); L 13–15	Did not advance			15
Najmeh Sazanjian	Women's individual	Novitha (INA) L 3–5; Pochekutova (KAZ) W 5–2; Kim (KOR) L 4–5; Pokeaw (THA) W 5–1	10 Q	Bye	Permatasari (INA); L 11–15	Did not advance			10
Kiana Bagherzadeh; Parimah Barzegar; Faezeh Rafiei; Najmeh Sazanjian	Women's team	—N/a			Bye	South Korea; L 23–45	Did not advance		6

=== Football ===
Team	Event	Preliminary round				Round of 16	Quarterfinal	Semifinal	Final	Rank
Team	Event	Round 1	Round 2	Round 3	Rank	Round of 16	Quarterfinal	Semifinal	Final	Rank
Iran	Men	Saudi Arabia; D 0–0	North Korea; W 3–0	Myanmar; L 0–2	1 Q	South Korea; L 0–2	Did not advance			15
Roster: Mehdi Amini; Mohammad Aghajanpour; Mohammad Moslemipour; Mehdi Rahimi; Alireza Arta; Mohammad Soltanimehr; Younes Delfi; Mohammad Amin Asadi; Mehdi Mehdikhani; Mohammad Reza Azadi; Mehdi Ghayedi; Shahab Adeli; Abolfazl Razzaghpour; Reza Jabireh; Ahmad Reza Ahmadvand; Amir Roustaei; Sina Zamehran; Shahin Abbasian; Mohammad Khodabandehloo; Aref Aghasi; Coach: (Croatia) Zlatko Kranjčar

=== Gymnastics ===
==== Artistic ====
Athlete	Event	Qualification		Final	
Athlete	Event	Score	Rank	Score	Rank
Mehdi Ahmadkohani; Saeid Reza Keikha; Mohammad Reza Khosronejad; Saman Madani	Men's team	230.300	8 Q	164.250	8
Mehdi Ahmadkohani	Men's individual all-around	DNF	—	—N/a	
Saeid Reza Keikha	Men's individual all-around	DNF	—	—N/a	
Mohammad Reza Khosronejad	Men's individual all-around	77.550	11	—N/a	
Saman Madani	Men's individual all-around	74.350	20	—N/a	
Mehdi Ahmadkohani	Men's floor	DNS	—	Did not advance	
Saeid Reza Keikha	Men's floor	12.700	23	Did not advance	
Mohammad Reza Khosronejad	Men's floor	12.850	21	Did not advance	
Saman Madani	Men's floor	12.500	26	Did not advance	
Mehdi Ahmadkohani	Men's pommel horse	10.400	44	Did not advance	
Saeid Reza Keikha	Men's pommel horse	14.300	7 Q	14.775	4
Mohammad Reza Khosronejad	Men's pommel horse	12.700	19	Did not advance	
Saman Madani	Men's pommel horse	11.850	31	Did not advance	
Mehdi Ahmadkohani	Men's rings	14.100	14	Did not advance	
Saeid Reza Keikha	Men's rings	DNS	—	Did not advance	
Mohammad Reza Khosronejad	Men's rings	13.500	25	Did not advance	
Saman Madani	Men's rings	12.700	38	Did not advance	
Saman Madani	Men's vault	13.225	14	Did not advance	
Mehdi Ahmadkohani	Men's parallel bars	12.400	38	Did not advance	
Saeid Reza Keikha	Men's parallel bars	DNS	—	Did not advance	
Mohammad Reza Khosronejad	Men's parallel bars	13.500	19	Did not advance	
Saman Madani	Men's parallel bars	11.550	49	Did not advance	
Mehdi Ahmadkohani	Men's horizontal bar	12.350	27	Did not advance	
Saeid Reza Keikha	Men's horizontal bar	DNS	—	Did not advance	
Mohammad Reza Khosronejad	Men's horizontal bar	12.400	26	Did not advance	
Saman Madani	Men's horizontal bar	12.200	31	Did not advance	

=== Handball ===
Team	Event	Preliminary round			Second round				Semifinal	Final	Rank
Team	Event	Round 1	Round 2	Rank	Round 1	Round 2	Round 3	Rank	Semifinal	Final	Rank
Iran	Men	Malaysia; W 55–11	Qatar; L 20–35	2 Q	Bahrain; L 23–29	Hong Kong; W 46–20	South Korea; L 28–34	3	Did not advance	5th place match Saudi Arabia; W 30–23	5
Roster: Mojtaba Heidarpour; Milad Masaeli; Shahoo Nosrati; Alireza Mousavi; Mehdi Bijari; Mehdi Mousavi; Salaman Barbat; Mohsen Babasafari; Ehsan Abouei; Farzad Rostami; Ali Rahimi; Mehrdad Samsami; Jalal Kiani; Afshin Sadeghi; Mohammad Jomepour; Amin Kazemi; Coach: (Montenegro) Zoran Kastratović

=== Judo ===
Athlete	Event	Round of 32	Round of 16	Quarterfinal	Semifinal	Final	Rank
Alireza Khojasteh	Men's 66 kg	Bye	Kim (PRK); L 00–10	Did not advance			9
Mohammad Mohammadi	Men's 73 kg	Bye	Nakano (PHI); W 10–00	Rysmambetov (KGZ); W 01–00	An (KOR); L 00–10	3rd place match Kim (PRK); W 10–00	3rd place, bronze medalist(s)
Saeid Mollaei	Men's 81 kg	Bye	George (INA); W 10–00	Gao (CHN); W 10–00	Lee (KOR); W 11–00	Khamza (KAZ); L 01–10	2nd place, silver medalist(s)
Javad Mahjoub	Men's +100 kg	—N/a	Bye	Toktogonov (KGZ); W 01–00	Düürenbayar (MGL); L 00–10	3rd place match Oltiboev (UZB); L 00–01	5
Mobina Azizi	Women's 57 kg	Bye	Lu (CHN); L 00–10	Did not advance			9
Donya Aghaei	Women's 70 kg	—N/a	Zhu (CHN); L 00–10	Did not advance			9

=== Ju-jitsu ===
Jiu-jitsu

Athlete	Event	Round of 64	Round of 32	Round of 16	Quarterfinal	Semifinal	Final	Rank
Mehran Sattar	Men's 56 kg	—N/a	Kuntong (THA); L 0–9	Did not advance				17
Ahmad Reza Eidi	Men's 62 kg	—N/a	Ramadhan (INA); W 8–0	Agaýew (TKM); L SUB (0–0)	Did not advance			9
Amir Hossein Khademian	Men's 69 kg	—N/a	Bagynbai Uulu (KGZ); L 0–0	Did not advance				17
Hamid Amraei	Men's 77 kg	Bye	Farman (KUW); W DSQ (3–0)	Al-Rasheed (JOR); L 0–2	Did not advance			9
Mohammad Mansouri Davar	Men's 77 kg	Bye	Israilov (KAZ); L SUB (0–0)	Did not advance				17
Mohsen Hamidi	Men's 85 kg	—N/a	Sukandar (INA); W 0–0	Murtazaliev (KGZ); L 0–0	Did not advance			9
Habib Ranjbar	Men's 85 kg	—N/a	Nemekhbayar (MGL); W 0–0	Al-Rasheed (JOR); L 0–10	Did not advance			9
Masoud Jalilvand	Men's 94 kg	—N/a	Möngönbayar (MGL); W WO	Granduke (JOR); L SUB (0–0)	Did not advance			9
Nahid Pirhadi	Women's 49 kg	—N/a	Bye	Đào (VIE); W 2–0	Khan (CAM); L SUB (0–0)	Repechage; Al-Yafei (UAE); L 3–6	Did not advance	7
Nasim Mohammadi	Women's 62 kg	—N/a	Senatham (THA); L 0–3	Did not advance				17

=== Kabaddi ===
Team	Event	Preliminary round						Semifinal	Final	Rank
Team	Event	Round 1	Round 2	Round 3	Round 4	Round 5	Rank	Semifinal	Final	Rank
Iran	Men	Japan; W 55–20	Pakistan; W 36–20	Malaysia; W 58–24	Nepal; W 75–21	Indonesia; W 65–24	1 Q	India; W 27–18	South Korea; W 26–16	1st place, gold medalist(s)
Iran	Women	South Korea; W 46–20	Bangladesh; W 47–19	Chinese Taipei; L 18–22	—N/a		1 Q	Thailand; W 23–16	India; W 27–24	1st place, gold medalist(s)
Roster – Men: Fazel Atrachali; Mohammad Esmaeil Nabibakhsh; Mohammad Amin Nosrati; Hadi Oshtorak; Mohammad Mallak; Mohammad Ghorbani; Esmaeil Maghsoudloo; Meisam Abbasi; Mohsen Maghsoudloo; Abouzar Mohajer; Abolfazl Maghsoudloo; Hamid Mirzaei; Coach: Gholamreza Mazandarani Roster – Women: Ghazal Khalaj; Mahboubeh Sanchouli; Farideh Zarifdoust; Saeideh Jafari; Raheleh Naderi; Roya Davoudian; Samira Atarodian; Fatemeh Karami; Azadeh Seidi; Sedigheh Jafari; Zahra Karimi; Zahra Abbasi; Coach: (India) Shailaja Jain

=== Karate ===
Athlete	Event	Round of 32	Round of 16	Quarterfinal	Semifinal	Final	Rank
Amir Mehdizadeh	Men's 60 kg	Bye	Macaalay (PHI); W 6–0	Nguyễn (VIE); W 0–0	Saymatov (UZB); W 7–6	Arrosyiid (INA); L 7–9	2nd place, silver medalist(s)
Bahman Asgari	Men's 75 kg	Wahedi (AFG); W 8–0	Khangaikhüü (MGL); W 8–0	Pongsai (THA); W 2–0	Hsu (TPE); W 0–0	Al-Turkistani (KSA); W 5–0	1st place, gold medalist(s)
Zabihollah Pourshab	Men's 84 kg	—N/a	Haidarov (TJK); W 8–0	Shrestha (NEP); W HAN (0–0)	Al-Mesfer (KUW); L 5–5	3rd place match Sajan (JOR); W 3–2	3rd place, bronze medalist(s)
Sajjad Ganjzadeh	Men's +84 kg	—N/a	Tantish (PLE); W WO	Hamedi (KSA); W 4–1	Shadykanov (KGZ); W 2–1	Nguyễn (VIE); W 5–2	1st place, gold medalist(s)
Taravat Khaksar	Women's 55 kg	—N/a	Haidare (AFG); W 9–0	Sanistyarani (INA); W 1–1	Ding (CHN); W 5–1	Wen (TPE); L 0–4	2nd place, silver medalist(s)
Rozita Alipour	Women's 61 kg	—N/a	Shin (KOR); W 5–0	Sukkiaw (THA); W 3–0	Mirzaeva (UZB); W 0–0	Yin (CHN); L 0–0	2nd place, silver medalist(s)
Pegah Zangeneh	Women's 68 kg	—N/a	Bye	Gafurova (KAZ); L 0–0	Repechage; Annadurdieva (UZB); W 3–0	3rd place match Nguyễn (VIE); W 10–0	3rd place, bronze medalist(s)
Hamideh Abbasali	Women's +68 kg	—N/a		Akhmedova (UZB); W 7–0	Uekusa (JPN); L 1–2	3rd place match Nguyễn (VIE); W 3–0	3rd place, bronze medalist(s)

=== Kurash ===
Athlete	Event	Round of 32	Round of 16	Quarterfinal	Semifinal	Final	Rank
Ghanbar Ali Ghanbari	Men's 66 kg	Osmonaliev (KGZ); W 110–000	Damen (KAZ); W 112–000	Dodov (TJK); W 010–003	Gaybulloev (UZB); L 000–101	Did not advance	3rd place, bronze medalist(s)
Behzad Vahdani	Men's 66 kg	Chan (TPE); L 002–110	Did not advance				17
Elias Aliakbari	Men's 81 kg	Allaberdiýew (TKM); W 102–000	Rahman (INA); W 111–000	Gaajadamba (MGL); W 001–001	Shomurodov (UZB); W 003–001	Khojazoda (TJK); W 011–010	1st place, gold medalist(s)
Omid Tiztak	Men's 81 kg	Omirow (TKM); W 111–001	Soeda (JPN); W 013–000	Mohammadi (AFG); W 012–002	Khojazoda (TJK); L 000–100	Did not advance	3rd place, bronze medalist(s)
Ghasem Ahadi	Men's 90 kg	Imamov (UZB); L 001–101	Did not advance				17
Mohammad Malekmohammadi	Men's 90 kg	Bye	Azizi (AFG); L 010–100	Did not advance			9
Jafar Pahlevani	Men's +90 kg	Khorkashev (TJK); W 010–000	Kumar (IND); W 100–000	Kuralov (KGZ); W 100–000	Turaev (UZB); W 010–010	Khisomiddinov (UZB); L 000–001	2nd place, silver medalist(s)
Mohammad Ali Zakeri	Men's +90 kg	Sarwari (AFG); L 010–014	Did not advance				17
Tahereh Azarpeivand	Women's 52 kg	Bye	Dyussembayeva (KAZ); W 010–002	Abdumajidova (UZB); L 002–011	Did not advance		5
Azar Kolivand	Women's 63 kg	Biju (IND); W 001–001	Kubasheva (KAZ); L 001–100	Did not advance			9
Zahra Naderi	Women's 63 kg	Choi (KOR); W 101–000	Shifa (INA); L 010–010	Did not advance			9
Zahra Bagheri	Women's 78 kg	Bye	Muhammedowa (TKM); W 012–000	Mönkhtsetseg (MGL); L 001–002	Did not advance		5

=== Paragliding ===
Athlete	Event	Round										Total	Rank
Athlete	Event	1	2	3	4	5	6	7	8	9	10	Total	Rank
Hossein Abbasgholizadeh	Men's individual accuracy	21	13	7	16	147	0	~~500~~	500	11	1	716	14
Alireza Amidi	Men's individual accuracy	2	155	3	76	218	469	0	~~500~~	6	90	1019	20
Hossein Abbasgholizadeh; Alireza Amidi; Mahmoud Shirazinia	Men's team accuracy	1075	1262	1240	1097	1865	1476	—N/a				8015	10

=== Pencak silat ===
Athlete	Event	Round of 16	Quarterfinal	Semifinal	Final	Rank
Hamed Havasi	Men's 60 kg	Abdullaev (UZB); W 5–0	Nguyễn (VIE); L 0–5	Did not advance		5
Mohammad Rahimi	Men's 65 kg	Kumar (NEP); W 5–0	Salimov (UZB); L 0–3	Did not advance		5
Akbar Kianian	Men's 70 kg	Bye	Jamari (MAS); L 0–5	Did not advance		5
Mohsen Ranjdoust	Men's 75 kg	Bye	Rusdana (INA); L 0–5	Did not advance		5
Babak Hashemzadeh	Men's 90 kg	—N/a	Alau'ddin (SGP); L 0–5	Did not advance		5
Mohammad Mortazi	Men's 95 kg	Baratov (UZB); W 5–0	Yaacob (MAS); L 0–5	Did not advance		5
Zahra Foroughinasab	Women's 55 kg	Bye	Saiful (SGP); L 0–5	Did not advance		5
Nazanin Mirmohammadtabar	Women's 60 kg	Ajak (MAS); L 0–5	Did not advance			9
Tahmineh Karbalaei	Women's 65 kg	—N/a	Kamalova (KGZ); W WO	Nguyễn (VIE); L 0–5	Did not advance	3rd place, bronze medalist(s)

=== Rowing ===
Athlete	Event	Heat		Repechage		Final		Rank
Athlete	Event	Time	Rank	Time	Rank	Time	Rank	Rank
Mojtaba Shojaei	Men's single sculls	8:21.77	3	8:02.94	3 QB	Final B 7:49.36	2	8
Mohsen Shadi; Aghel Habibian	Men's double sculls	7:20.77	4	7:12.40	3 QB	Final B 8:24.88	3	9
Siavash Saeidi; Bahman Nassiri; Masoud Mohammadi; Mojtaba Shojaei	Men's quadruple sculls	6:22.27	1 QA	Bye		6:28.72	5	5
Mohsen Shadi	Men's lightweight single sculls	7:54.98	2	7:59.15	2 QA	7:22.86	5	5
Reza Ghahramani; Amir Hossein Mahmoudpour	Men's lightweight double sculls	7:15.77	2	7:21.39	2 QA	7:18.80	5	5
Mahsa Javer	Women's single sculls	9:18.21	3	8:40.63	2 QA	8:52.69	6	6
Maryam Karami; Parisa Ahmadi	Women's double sculls	8:07.72	3 QA	—N/a		7:35.45	3	3rd place, bronze medalist(s)
Nazanin Malaei	Women's lightweight single sculls	8:30.49	2 QA	—N/a		8:19.28	2	2nd place, silver medalist(s)
Nazanin Rahmani; Maryam Omidi Parsa	Women's lightweight double sculls	7:50.87	2 QA	—N/a		7:48.38	2	2nd place, silver medalist(s)
Maryam Karami; Mahsa Javer; Nazanin Rahmani; Maryam Omidi Parsa	Women's lightweight quadruple sculls	7:23.45	1 QA	Bye		7:04.38	2	2nd place, silver medalist(s)

=== Sailing ===
Athlete	Event	Race												Total	Rank
Athlete	Event	1	2	3	4	5	6	7	8	9	10	11	12	Total	Rank
Masoud Janinasab	Men's Laser	~~14~~	14	12	13	14	14	14	14	12	13	12	14	146	14
Nima Rahbari	Open Laser 4.7	~~21~~	20	19	16	17	18	17	18	19	18	19	16	197	18

=== Sambo ===
Athlete	Event	Round of 32	Round of 16	Quarterfinal	Semifinal	Repechage	Final	Rank
Soheil Jamalabadi	Men's 52 kg	Dzhomii (TJK); L SUB (0–1)	Did not advance	Repechage; Akhmedjanov (UZB); L 0–1	Did not advance			13
Iraj Amirkhani	Men's 90 kg	Bye	Siswanto (INA); W 8–0	Kholmamatov (UZB); L 1–4	Repechage; Sato (JPN); W 4–0	Repechage; Zekenov (KAZ); L SUB (0–1)	Did not advance	7
Elham Bahrami	Women's 48 kg	—N/a	Bye	Turgunbaeva (UZB); L SUB (0–1)	Repechage; Zaripowa (TKM); L 0–1	Did not advance		9
Akram Khani	Women's 68 kg	Bye	Kadyrbekova (KGZ); L 0–1	Did not advance				13

=== Sepak takraw ===
Athlete	Event	Preliminary round					Semifinal	Final	Rank
Athlete	Event	Round 1	Round 2	Round 3	Round 4	Rank	Semifinal	Final	Rank
Mehrdad Jafari; Omid Hassani; Amir Khani; Vahid Maleki; Vahid Ebrahimi; Abdolnaser Pangh	Men's quadrant	Pakistan; W 2–0 (21–4, 21–2)	Vietnam; L 0–2 (16–21, 24–25)	Nepal; W 2–0 (21–11, 21–7)	Singapore; L 0–2 (19–21, 16–21)	3	Did not advance		5
Mehrdad Jafari; Sina Rezaei; Omid Hassani; Amir Khani; Mohammad Safaei Majd; Vahid Maleki; Vahid Ebrahimi; Abdolnaser Pangh; Ehsan Amanbaei; Farshad Kaikani; Morteza Moghaddam; Hamid Reza Gervehei	Men's team regu	Indonesia; L 0–3 (0–2, 0–2, 0–2)	India; L 1–2 (1–2, 0–2, 2–0)	—N/a		3	Did not advance		5

=== Shooting ===
Athlete	Event	Qualification		Final	
Athlete	Event	Score	Rank	Score	Rank
Ebrahim Barkhordari	Men's 10 m air pistol	569	25	Did not advance	
Javad Foroughi	Men's 10 m air pistol	572	21	Did not advance	
Amir Mohammad Nekounam	Men's 10 m air rifle	625.7	6 Q	141.4	7
Amir Siavash Zolfagharian	Men's 10 m air rifle	623.1	12	Did not advance	
Pouria Norouzian	Men's 50 m rifle 3 positions	1155	12	Did not advance	
Mahyar Sedaghat	Men's 50 m rifle 3 positions	1164	4 Q	406.0	6
Ali Hafezi	Men's trap	103	28	Did not advance	
Mohammad Hossein Parvareshnia	Men's trap	112	23	Did not advance	
Ramtin Besharati	Men's skeet	107	27	Did not advance	
Ali Dousti	Men's skeet	116	21	Did not advance	
Amitis Jafari	Women's 10 m air pistol	568	12	Did not advance	
Golnoush Sebghatollahi	Women's 10 m air pistol	571	4 Q	192.9	4
Hanieh Rostamian	Women's 25 m pistol	561	27	Did not advance	
Golnoush Sebghatollahi	Women's 25 m pistol	572	22	Did not advance	
Elaheh Ahmadi	Women's 10 m air rifle	626.2	5 Q	141.8	7
Armina Sadeghian	Women's 10 m air rifle	624.7	6 Q	206.3	4
Elaheh Ahmadi	Women's 50 m rifle 3 positions	1163	4 Q	400.6	7
Mahlagha Jambozorg	Women's 50 m rifle 3 positions	1162	6 Q	441.2	3rd place, bronze medalist(s)
Shiva Farahpour	Women's trap	110	14	Did not advance	
Sepideh Sirani	Women's trap	107	19	Did not advance	
Shiva Farahpour	Women's double trap	94	13	—N/a	
Ebrahim Barkhordari; Hanieh Rostamian	Mixed 10 m air pistol team	757	9	Did not advance	
Amir Mohammad Nekounam; Najmeh Khedmati	Mixed 10 m air rifle team	828.4	7	Did not advance	
Mohammad Hossein Parvareshnia; Sepideh Sirani	Mixed trap team	128	10	Did not advance	

=== Sport climbing ===
Speed

Athlete	Event	Qualification		Round of 16	Quarterfinal	Semifinal	Final	Rank
Athlete	Event	Time	Rank	Round of 16	Quarterfinal	Semifinal	Final	Rank
Mehdi Alipour	Men's speed	6.391	7 Q	Paul (SGP); W 7.940–Fall	Alipour (IRI); L 6.688–5.805	Did not advance		7
Reza Alipour	Men's speed	5.835	2 Q	Kamal (SGP); W 6.426–8.505	Alipour (IRI); W 5.805–6.688	Sabri (INA); W 5.633–Fall	Zhong (CHN); W 6.390–FS	1st place, gold medalist(s)
Mehdi Alipour; Reza Alipour; Ehsan Asrar	Men's speed relay	20.325	4 Q	—N/a	China; L 24.251–20.754	Did not advance		6
Azam Karami	Women's speed	10.084	9 Q	Sa (KOR); L 10.924–9.690	Did not advance			11
Kobra Lakzaeifar	Women's speed	9.321	6 Q	Zhiznevskaya (KAZ); W 9.473–11.010	He (CHN); L 11.604–8.380	Did not advance		7
Azam Karami; Kobra Lakzaeifar; Hadis Nazari	Women's speed relay	32.850	5 Q	—N/a	Indonesia; W 32.216–FS	Indonesia; L 31.709–26.157	3rd place match China; L 31.259–27.860	4

Combined

Athlete	Event	Qualification					Final				
Athlete	Event	Speed	Boulder	Lead	Total	Rank	Speed	Boulder	Lead	Total	Rank
Khosro Hashemzadeh	Men's combined	8.420; 19	1T 2z 11	28+ 6	1254	15	Did not advance				
Elnaz Rekabi	Women's combined	11.454; 12	3T 4z 3.5	37+ 6	252	7	Did not advance				

=== Squash ===
Individual

Athlete	Event	Round of 32	Round of 16	Quarterfinal	Semifinal	Final	Rank
Alireza Shameli	Men's singles	Kang (SGP); W 3–0 (12–10, 11–7, 11–9)	Al-Tamimi (KUW); L 1–3 (5–11, 12–10, 8–11, 8–11)	Did not advance			9
Sajjad Zareeian	Men's singles	Lee (KOR); W 3–1 (11–3, 10–12, 11–5, 11–5)	Lee (HKG); L 0–3 (6–11, 5–11, 5–11)	Did not advance			9
Fereshteh Eghtedari	Women's singles	Yeung (MAC); W 3–0 (11–5, 11–5, 11–9)	Watanabe (JPN); L 0–3 (7–11, 5–11, 2–11)	Did not advance			9
Hadis Farzad	Women's singles	Aribado (PHI); L 1–3 (6–11, 9–11, 11–7, 5–11)	Did not advance				17

Team

Athlete	Event	Preliminary round						Semifinal	Final	Rank
Athlete	Event	Round 1	Round 2	Round 3	Round 4	Round 5	Rank	Semifinal	Final	Rank
Fereshteh Eghtedari; Hadis Farzad; Ghazal Sharafpour	Women's team	India; L 0–3 (0–3, 0–3, 0–3)	Hong Kong; L 0–3 (0–3, 0–3, 1–3)	Thailand; W 3–0 (3–0, 3–1, 3–0)	Indonesia; L 1–2 (3–0, 2–3, 0–3)	China; L 1–2 (2–3, 3–0, 0–3)	5	Did not advance		9

=== Table tennis ===
Individual

Athlete	Event	Round of 64	Round of 32	Round of 16	Quarterfinal	Semifinal	Final	Rank
Nima Alamian	Men's singles	Bye	Rizal (MAS); W 4–1 (10, 7, 4, −8, 11)	Ueda (JPN); L 1–4 (13, −6, −5, −7, −10)	Did not advance			9
Noshad Alamian	Men's singles	Bye	Nguyễn (VIE); W 4–0 (9, 8, 9, 9)	Jeoung (KOR); W 4–3 (7, 10, −3, −8, −7, 11, 12)	Wong (HKG); W 4–1 (−6, 8, 10, 5, 8)	Lin (CHN); L 0–4 (−10, −7, −6, −2)	Did not advance	3rd place, bronze medalist(s)
Mahshid Ashtari	Women's singles	Bye	Kim (PRK); L 0–4 (−8, −5, −7, −10)	Did not advance				17
Neda Shahsavari	Women's singles	Bye	Cha (PRK); L 0–4 (−4, −2, −9, −4)	Did not advance				17

Team

Athlete	Event	Preliminary round					Quarterfinal	Semifinal	Final	Rank
Athlete	Event	Round 1	Round 2	Round 3	Round 4	Rank	Quarterfinal	Semifinal	Final	Rank
Amin Ahmadian; Nima Alamian; Noshad Alamian; Afshin Norouzi	Men's team	Kyrgyzstan; W 3–0 (3–0, 3–0, 3–0)	Japan; L 1–3 (3–0, 1–3, 1–3, 1–3)	Maldives; W 3–0 (3–0, 3–0, 3–0)	Thailand; W 3–1 (3–2, 3–0, 2–3, 3–2)	2 Q	Chinese Taipei; L 0–3 (0–3, 1–3, 0–3)	Did not advance		5
Mahshid Ashtari; Saba Safari; Maryam Samet; Neda Shahsavari	Women's team	China; L 0–3 (0–3, 0–3, 0–3)	Qatar; W 3–0 (3–0, 3–0, 3–1)	India; L 1–3 (0–3, 3–2, 0–3, 2–3)	—N/a	3	Did not advance			9

=== Taekwondo ===
Poomsae

Athlete	Event	Round of 16	Quarterfinal	Semifinal	Final	Rank
Kourosh Bakhtiar	Men's individual	Phal (CAM); W 8.22–7.81	Wahyu (INA); W 8.25–8.19	Chen (TPE); W 8.57–8.48	Kang (KOR); L 8.73–8.81	2nd place, silver medalist(s)
Amir Reza Mehraban; Kourosh Bakhtiar; Ali Sohrabi	Men's team	Bye	Philippines; L 8.10–8.33	Did not advance		5
Marjan Salahshouri	Women's individual	Chim (MAC); W 8.01–7.59	Umehara (JPN); W 8.27–7.99	Yap (MAS); W 8.43–8.30	Rosmaniar (INA); L 8.47–8.69	2nd place, silver medalist(s)
Marjan Salahshouri; Mahsa Sadeghi; Fatemeh Hesam	Women's team	South Korea; L 7.95–8.12	Did not advance			9

Kyorugi

Athlete	Event	Round of 32	Round of 16	Quarterfinal	Semifinal	Final	Rank
Farzan Ashourzadeh	Men's 58 kg	Bye	Sunatov (TJK); W 26–3	Võ (VIE); W 13–6	Pulatov (UZB); L 13–15	Did not advance	3rd place, bronze medalist(s)
Mirhashem Hosseini	Men's 63 kg	Bye	Agojo (PHI); W 24–2	Toirov (UZB); W 29–9	Cho (KOR); W 37–29	Zhao (CHN); W 17–11	1st place, gold medalist(s)
Amir Mohammad Bakhshi	Men's 68 kg	Bye	Zokirov (UZB); W 24–4	Huang (TPE); W 15–13	Abughaush (JOR); W 10–8	Lee (KOR); L 10–12	2nd place, silver medalist(s)
Mehdi Khodabakhshi	Men's 80 kg	Bye	Lee (KOR); L 22–24	Did not advance			9
Saeid Rajabi	Men's +80 kg	—N/a	Lee (KOR); W 6–3	Sun (CHN); W 5–4	Zhaparov (KAZ); W 11–7	Shokin (UZB); W 3–2	1st place, gold medalist(s)
Nahid Kiani	Women's 49 kg	Bye	Khadka (NEP); W 43–4	Canabal (PHI); W 23–15	Wongpattanakit (THA); L 6–11	Did not advance	3rd place, bronze medalist(s)
Elaheh Sheidaei	Women's 53 kg	Bye	Aragon (PHI); W 10–2	Aldangorova (KAZ); L 3–11	Did not advance		5
Parisa Javadi	Women's 57 kg	Tulepbergenova (KAZ); L 10–15	Did not advance				17
Melika Mirhosseini	Women's 67 kg	—N/a	Bạc (VIE); W 23–8	Al-Sadeq (JOR); L 5–21	Did not advance		5
Zahra Pouresmaeil	Women's +67 kg	—N/a	Osipova (UZB); L 3–6	Did not advance			9

=== Tennis ===
Athlete	Event	Round of 64	Round of 32	Round of 16	Quarterfinal	Semifinal	Final	Rank
Amir Hossein Badi	Men's singles	Urumbaev (KGZ); W WO	Jung (TPE); L 0–2 (0–6, 2–6)	Did not advance				17
Shahin Khaledan	Men's singles	Babak (KGZ); W WO	Watanuki (JPN); L 0–2 (1–6, 3–6)	Did not advance				17
Mohammad Kargaran; Shahin Khaledan	Men's doubles	Bye	Wong and Yeung (HKG); L 0–2 (4–6, 2–6)	Did not advance				17
Ghazal Pakbaten	Women's singles	Bye	Al-Nabhani (OMA); L 0–2 (0–6, 4–6)	Did not advance				17
Sadaf Sadegh-Vaziri	Women's singles	Jeong (KOR); L 0–2 (0–6, 0–6)	Did not advance					33
Ghazal Pakbaten; Sadaf Sadegh-Vaziri	Women's doubles	—N/a	Fodor and Lý-Nguyễn (VIE); L 0–2 (6–7, 1–6)	Did not advance				17

=== Triathlon ===
Athlete	Event	Time	Rank
Behzad Nobaripour	Men's individual	1:55:32	14

=== Volleyball ===
==== Beach ====
Athlete	Event	Preliminary round				Round of 16	Quarterfinal	Semifinal	Final	Rank
Athlete	Event	Round 1	Round 2	Round 3	Rank	Round of 16	Quarterfinal	Semifinal	Final	Rank
Rahman Raoufi; Abdolhamed Mirzaali	Men	Xavier and Xavier (TLS); W 2–0 (21–12, 21–10)	Shimizu and Hasegawa (JPN); W 2–1 (20–22, 21–19, 15–13)	Lý and Nguyễn (VIE); W 2–0 (21–15, 21–12)	1 Q	Inkiew and Padsawud (THA); W 2–0 (21–18, 21–16)	Gao and Li (CHN); L 0–2 (15–21, 17–21)	Did not advance		5
Bahman Salemi; Arash Vakili	Men	Jongklang and Khaolumtarn (THA); W 2–0 (21–17, 21–18)	Sajid and Abdul Wahid (MDV); W 2–0 (21–11, 21–17)	Abdelrasoul and Sammoud (QAT); W 2–1 (17–21, 21–17, 17–15)	1 Q	Ageba and Shiratori (JPN); W 2–0 (21–18, 21–15)	Younousse and Tijan (QAT); L 1–2 (16–21, 21–18, 11–15)	Did not advance		5

==== Indoor ====
Team	Event	Preliminary round			Round of 16	Quarterfinal	Semifinal	Final	Rank
Team	Event	Round 1	Round 2	Rank	Round of 16	Quarterfinal	Semifinal	Final	Rank
Iran	Men	Pakistan; W 3–0 (25–16, 25–18, 33–31)	Mongolia; W 3–0 (25–18, 25–19, 25–20)	1 Q	China; W 3–0 (27–25, 25–20, 25–21)	Bye	Qatar; W 3–0 (25–23, 25–19, 25–18)	South Korea; W 3–0 (25–17, 25–22, 25–21)	1st place, gold medalist(s)
Roster: Milad Ebadipour; Saman Faezi; Saeid Marouf; Farhad Ghaemi; Mohammad Mousavi; Amir Ghafour; Saber Kazemi; Mohammad Javad Manavinejad; Ali Shafiei; Mohammad Taher Vadi; Mehdi Marandi; Morteza Sharifi; Mohammad Reza Hazratpour; Amir Hossein Toukhteh; Coach: (Montenegro) Igor Kolaković

=== Weightlifting ===
Athlete	Event	Snatch		Clean & Jerk		Total	
Athlete	Event	Result	Rank	Result	Rank	Result	Rank
Majid Askari	Men's 69 kg	NM	—	—	—	—	—
Ali Makvandi	Men's 85 kg	NM	—	—	—	—	—
Sohrab Moradi	Men's 94 kg	189 WR	1	221	1	410 GR	1st place, gold medalist(s)
Kianoush Rostami	Men's 94 kg	175	2	NM	—	—	—
Mohammad Reza Barari	Men's 105 kg	NM	—	—	—	—	—
Ali Hashemi	Men's 105 kg	184	2	219	4	403	3rd place, bronze medalist(s)
Saeid Alihosseini	Men's +105 kg	208	1	248	3	456	2nd place, silver medalist(s)
Behdad Salimi	Men's +105 kg	208	2	253	1	461	1st place, gold medalist(s)

=== Wrestling ===
Freestyle

Athlete	Event	Round of 32	Round of 16	Quarterfinal	Semifinal	Final	Rank
Reza Atri	Men's 57 kg	Bye	Teli (NEP); W 10–0	Tomar (IND); W 15–9	Bekhbayar (MGL); L 2–8	3rd place match Kim (KOR); W 9–4	3rd place, bronze medalist(s)
Mehran Nassiri	Men's 65 kg	Yeerlanbieke (CHN); L 7–8	Did not advance				13
Mostafa Hosseinkhani	Men's 74 kg	Amzad (BAN); W 10–0	Orazgylyjow (TKM); W 12–2	Abdurakhmonov (UZB); L 2–4	Repechage; Al-Quhali (YEM); W WO	3rd place match Fujinami (JPN); L 8–9	5
Hassan Yazdani	Men's 86 kg	Bye	Fahriansyah (INA); W 10–0	Kumar (IND); W 11–0	Üitümen (MGL); W 12–2	Abounader (LBN); W 10–0	1st place, gold medalist(s)
Alireza Karimi	Men's 97 kg	—N/a	Bye	Yamaguchi (JPN); W 11–0	Ibragimov (UZB); W Fall (4–2)	Musaev (KGZ); W 6–0	1st place, gold medalist(s)
Parviz Hadi	Men's 125 kg	—N/a	Malik (IND); W 10–0	Boltin (KAZ); W 10–0	Modzmanashvili (UZB); W 11–8	Deng (CHN); W 7–0	1st place, gold medalist(s)

Greco-Roman

Athlete	Event	Round of 16	Quarterfinal	Semifinal	Final	Rank
Mehrdad Mardani	Men's 60 kg	Kim (KOR); W 7–3	Ota (JPN); L 0–9	Repechage; Sidik (INA); W 9–0	3rd place match Bakhromov (UZB); W 8–0	3rd place, bronze medalist(s)
Mohammad Reza Geraei	Men's 67 kg	Al-Hasan (SYR); W 11–2	Tasmuradov (UZB); W Fall (9–8)	Kebispayev (KAZ); L 0–10	3rd place match Hung (TPE); W 11–0	3rd place, bronze medalist(s)
Mohammad Ali Geraei	Men's 77 kg	Yang (CHN); W 8–0	Singh (IND); W 8–6	Yabiku (JPN); W 8–1	Makhmudov (KGZ); W 7–3	1st place, gold medalist(s)
Hossein Nouri	Men's 87 kg	Bye	Öwelekow (TKM); W 13–4	Al-Quhali (YEM); W 8–0	Assakalov (UZB); W 6–1	1st place, gold medalist(s)
Ali Akbar Heidari	Men's 97 kg	Bye	Ramadhani (INA); W 8–0	Cho (KOR); L 3–4	3rd place match Iskakov (KAZ); L 0–10	5
Behnam Mehdizadeh	Men's 130 kg	Ramonov (KGZ); W 3CA (10–3)	Meng (CHN); W Fall (5–0)	Abdullaev (UZB); L 2–2	3rd place match Kim (KOR); L 1–1	5

=== Wushu ===
Taolu

Athlete	Event	Round 1			Round 2			Total	Rank
Athlete	Event	Form	Score	Rank	Form	Score	Rank	Total	Rank
Fatemeh Heidari	Women's nanquan & nandao	Nanquan	9.37	9	Nandao	9.59	6	18.96	9
Hanieh Rajabi	Women's nanquan & nandao	Nanquan	9.43	7	Nandao	9.66	5	19.09	6
Zahra Kiani	Women's jianshu & qiangshu	Jianshu	9.70	2	Qiangshu	9.71	2	19.41	2nd place, silver medalist(s)

Sanda

Athlete	Event	Round of 32	Round of 16	Quarterfinal	Semifinal	Final	Rank
Reza Sobhani	Men's 56 kg	Bye	Widiyanto (INA); L 1–2	Did not advance			9
Erfan Ahangarian	Men's 60 kg	Sunthorn (THA); W PD	Al-Hajj (YEM); W 2–0	Jo (KOR); W 2–1	Singh (IND); W 2–0	Wang (CHN); W 2–1	1st place, gold medalist(s)
Foroud Zafari	Men's 65 kg	—N/a	Cahyadi (INA); W 2–0	Hoàng (VIE); W 2–0	Grewal (IND); W 2–0	Li (CHN); L 0–2	2nd place, silver medalist(s)
Mohsen Mohammadseifi	Men's 70 kg	—N/a	Ismailov (KAZ); W 2–0	Khotsombath (LAO); W TV	Ham (KOR); W 2–0	Shi (CHN); W 2–0	1st place, gold medalist(s)
Elaheh Mansourian	Women's 52 kg	—N/a	Devi (IND); W 2–0	Nguyễn (VIE); W 2–0	Wally (PHI); W 2–1	Li (CHN); L 0–2	2nd place, silver medalist(s)
Shahrbanoo Mansourian	Women's 60 kg	—N/a	Bye	Chu (VIE); W PD	Bualuang (THA); W PD	Cai (CHN); L 0–2	2nd place, silver medalist(s)

== Demonstration sports ==
=== Canoe polo ===
Athlete	Event	Preliminary round				Semifinal	Final	Rank
Athlete	Event	Round 1	Round 2	Round 3	Rank	Semifinal	Final	Rank
Reza Beigi; Nima Hojjati; Milad Jafari; Mohsen Sheikhlouvand; Mohammad Saleh Soltani; Amir Hossein Zamani	Men	Indonesia; W 17–1	Singapore; W 4–2	Malaysia; L 3–4	2 Q	Japan; L 8–9	3rd place match Chinese Taipei; L 3–4	4
Melika Boroun; Taraneh Kamyab; Delaram Marzabadi; Shiva Molavinia; Elaheh Pourabdian; Saba Rahmati	Women	Singapore; L 2–3	Malaysia; W 19–0	—N/a	2 Q	Chinese Taipei; W 6–3	Singapore; W 5–2	1st place, gold medalist(s)

=== Esports ===
Athlete	Event	Preliminary round				Quarterfinal	Semifinal	Final	Rank
Athlete	Event	Round 1	Round 2	Round 3	Rank	Quarterfinal	Semifinal	Final	Rank
Shahriar Shaki	StarCraft	—N/a				Pranasakti (INA); W 3–0	Cho (KOR); L 0–3	Trần (VIE); L 0–3	4
Reza Nobakht; Hassan Pajani	Pro Evolution Soccer	Kazakhstan; W 2–0	Hong Kong; W 2–0	Malaysia; W 2–0	1 Q	—N/a	Vietnam; W 2–1	Japan; L 1–2	2nd place, silver medalist(s)
