= Wushu at the 2018 Asian Games – Women's sanda 52 kg =

Women's sanda 52 kg at the 2018 Asian Games
- Venue: Jakarta International Expo
- Dates: 19–23 August 2018
- Competitors: 13 from 13 nations

Medalists
gold medal	Li Yueyao	China
silver medal	Elaheh Mansourian	Iran
bronze medal	Divine Wally	Philippines
bronze medal	Chen Wei-ting	Chinese Taipei

The women's sanda 52 kilograms competition at the 2018 Asian Games in Jakarta, Indonesia was held from 19 August to 23 August at the JIExpo Kemayoran Hall B3.

A total of thirteen competitors from thirteen countries (NOCs) competed in this event, limited to fighters whose body weight was less than 52 kilograms.

Li Yueyao from China won the gold medal after beating her opponent Elaheh Mansourian of Iran in gold medal bout 2–0, Li won the first round 5–0 and she finished the match in second round after throwing Mansourian out of the platform twice. Li won the gold medal without losing a single round in the entire competition.

The bronze medal was shared by both semifinal losers, Divine Wally from the Philippines and Chen Wei-ting from Chinese Taipei (Taiwan).

== Schedule ==
All times are Western Indonesia Time (UTC+07:00)

Date	Time	Event
Sunday, 19 August 2018	19:00	Round of 16
Tuesday, 21 August 2018	19:00	Quarterfinals
Wednesday, 22 August 2018	19:00	Semifinals
Thursday, 23 August 2018	10:00	Final

== Results ==
Legend

- PD — Won by point difference

Round of 16
Mimi Yoysaykham (LAO)	0
Divine Wally (PHI)	2
Yumnam Sanathoi Devi (IND)	0
Elaheh Mansourian (IRI)	2
Juni Rai (NEP)	0
Nguyễn Thị Thu Thuỷ (VIE)	2
Chen Wei-ting (TPE)	2
Maleesha Pathirage (SRI)	0
Kim Woo-jeonung (KOR)	0
Siriluk Kaewcha (THA)	2

Quarterfinals
Selviah Pertiwi (INA)	0
Divine Wally (PHI)	2
Elaheh Mansourian (IRI)	2
Nguyễn Thị Thu Thuỷ (VIE)	0
Zarina Rafique (PAK)	0
Chen Wei-ting (TPE)	2
Kaewcha Siriluk (THA)
Li Yueyao (CHN)	PD

Semifinals
Divine Wally (PHI)	1
Elaheh Mansourian (IRI)	2
Chen Wei-ting (TPE)
Li Yueyao (CHN)	PD

Final
Elaheh Mansourian (IRI)	0
Li Yueyao (CHN)	2
