= Fencing at the 2018 Asian Games – Men's individual épée =

Men's individual épée at the 2018 Asian Games
- Venue: Jakarta Convention Center
- Date: 19 August 2018
- Competitors: 33 from 18 nations

Medalists
gold medal	Dmitriy Alexanin	Kazakhstan
silver medal	Park Sang-young	South Korea
bronze medal	Jung Jin-sun	South Korea
bronze medal	Koki Kano	Japan

The men's individual épée competition at the 2018 Asian Games in Jakarta was held on 19 August at the Jakarta Convention Center.

== Schedule ==
All times are Western Indonesia Time (UTC+07:00)

Date	Time	Event
Sunday, 19 August 2018	10:00	Preliminaries
Sunday, 19 August 2018	12:55	Round of 32
Sunday, 19 August 2018	14:35	Round of 16
Sunday, 19 August 2018	15:55	Quarterfinals
Sunday, 19 August 2018	18:40	Semifinals
Sunday, 19 August 2018	20:00	Gold medal match

== Results ==
Legend

- DNS — Did not start

=== Preliminaries ===
==== Pool A ====
Athlete	KOR	CHN	IRI	THA	UAE	MGL	CAM
Park Sang-young (KOR)	—	2–5	5–4	5–2	4–5	5–4	5–3
Shi Gaofeng (CHN)	5–2	—	5–2	5–3	5–3	4–3	5–3
Mohammad Rezaei (IRI)	4–5	2–5	—	5–2	5–4	5–4	5–4
Korakote Juengamnuaychai (THA)	2–5	3–5	2–5	—	2–5	5–4	5–4
Abdullah Al-Hammadi (UAE)	5–4	3–5	4–5	5–2	—	4–5	5–3
Enkhtsogtyn Dölgöön (MGL)	4–5	3–4	4–5	4–5	5–4	—	2–5
Paul Vag-Urminsky (CAM)	3–5	3–5	4–5	4–5	3–5	5–2	—

==== Pool B ====
Athlete	KOR	UZB	CHN	KUW	QAT	PAK	MAS
Jung Jin-sun (KOR)	—	5–2	5–4	—	4–5	5–1	5–0
Fayzulla Alimov (UZB)	2–5	—	1–5	—	5–1	5–1	1–5
Lan Minghao (CHN)	4–5	5–1	—	—	5–1	5–0	5–4
Abdulaziz Al-Shatti (KUW)	—	—	—	—	—	—	—
Mohammed Al-Shamari (QAT)	5–4	1–5	1–5	—	—	5–1	5–2
Nazar Abbas Bhatti (PAK)	1–5	1–5	0–5	—	1–5	—	1–5
Mohd Roslan Mohamad (MAS)	0–5	5–1	4–5	—	2–5	5–1	—

==== Pool C ====
Athlete	KAZ	UZB	MAS	VIE	MGL	INA	PAK
Dmitriy Alexanin (KAZ)	—	1–3	4–5	5–3	5–4	5–2	5–1
Oleg Sokolov (UZB)	3–1	—	5–3	5–2	5–4	5–3	5–1
Joshua Koh (MAS)	5–4	3–5	—	5–2	2–5	5–1	5–3
Nguyễn Phước Đến (VIE)	3–5	2–5	2–5	—	5–2	5–2	5–0
Bayarsaikhany Batkhüü (MGL)	4–5	4–5	5–2	2–5	—	1–5	5–4
Derry Renanda Putra Siahaan (INA)	2–5	3–5	1–5	2–5	5–1	—	5–1
Ali Saeeduddin (PAK)	1–5	1–5	3–5	0–5	4–5	1–5	—

==== Pool D ====
Athlete	JPN	HKG	VIE	IRI	THA	KGZ
Koki Kano (JPN)	—	5–2	5–4	5–3	5–0	5–2
Fong Hoi Sun (HKG)	2–5	—	1–0	4–3	5–3	5–3
Nguyễn Tiến Nhật (VIE)	4–5	0–1	—	3–5	5–1	5–3
Mohammad Esmaeili (IRI)	3–5	3–4	5–3	—	5–3	3–5
Thanwa Chantharapidok (THA)	0–5	3–5	1–5	3–5	—	5–4
Roman Petrov (KGZ)	2–5	3–5	3–5	5–3	4–5	—

==== Pool E ====
Athlete	JPN	KAZ	KGZ	HKG	QAT	INA
Kazuyasu Minobe (JPN)	—	5–2	1–5	5–2	5–1	5–3
Ruslan Kurbanov (KAZ)	2–5	—	5–1	3–5	5–2	5–2
Khasan Baudunov (KGZ)	5–1	1–5	—	2–5	5–4	5–3
Ho Wai Hang (HKG)	2–5	5–3	5–2	—	5–0	5–2
Mohammed Mirzaei (QAT)	1–5	2–5	4–5	0–5	—	3–5
Ryan Pratama (INA)	3–5	2–5	3–5	2–5	5–3	—

==== Summary ====
Rank	Pool	Athlete	W	L	W/M	TD	TF
1	C	Oleg Sokolov (UZB)	6	0	1.000	+14	28
2	D	Koki Kano (JPN)	5	0	1.000	+14	25
3	A	Shi Gaofeng (CHN)	6	0	1.000	+13	29
4	B	Lan Minghao (CHN)	4	1	0.800	+13	24
5	B	Jung Jin-sun (KOR)	4	1	0.800	+12	24
6	E	Ho Wai Hang (HKG)	4	1	0.800	+10	22
7	E	Kazuyasu Minobe (JPN)	4	1	0.800	+8	21
8	D	Fong Hoi Sun (HKG)	4	1	0.800	+3	17
9	C	Dmitriy Alexanin (KAZ)	4	2	0.667	+7	25
10	C	Joshua Koh (MAS)	4	2	0.667	+5	25
11	A	Park Sang-young (KOR)	4	2	0.667	+3	26
12	A	Mohammad Rezaei (IRI)	4	2	0.667	+2	26
13	E	Ruslan Kurbanov (KAZ)	3	2	0.600	+5	20
14	E	Khasan Baudunov (KGZ)	3	2	0.600	0	18
15	B	Mohammed Al-Shamari (QAT)	3	2	0.600	0	17
16	C	Nguyễn Phước Đến (VIE)	3	3	0.500	+3	22
17	A	Abdullah Al-Hammadi (UAE)	3	3	0.500	+2	26
18	D	Nguyễn Tiến Nhật (VIE)	2	3	0.400	+2	17
19	D	Mohammad Esmaeili (IRI)	2	3	0.400	−1	19
20	B	Mohd Roslan Mohamad (MAS)	2	3	0.400	−1	16
21	B	Fayzulla Alimov (UZB)	2	3	0.400	−3	14
22	C	Derry Renanda Putra Siahaan (INA)	2	4	0.333	−4	18
23	C	Bayarsaikhany Batkhüü (MGL)	2	4	0.333	−5	21
24	A	Korakote Juengamnuaychai (THA)	2	4	0.333	−9	19
25	D	Roman Petrov (KGZ)	1	4	0.200	−6	17
26	E	Ryan Pratama (INA)	1	4	0.200	−8	15
27	D	Thanwa Chantharapidok (THA)	1	4	0.200	−12	12
28	A	Paul Vag-Urminsky (CAM)	1	5	0.167	−5	22
29	A	Enkhtsogtyn Dölgöön (MGL)	1	5	0.167	−6	22
30	E	Mohammed Mirzaei (QAT)	0	5	0.000	−15	10
31	C	Ali Saeeduddin (PAK)	0	6	0.000	−20	10
32	B	Nazar Abbas Bhatti (PAK)	0	5	0.000	−21	4
—	B	Abdulaziz Al-Shatti (KUW)			DNS		

=== Knockout round ===
==== Final ====
Gold medal match
9	Dmitriy Alexanin (KAZ)	15
11	Park Sang-young (KOR)	12

==== Top half ====
Round of 32
17	Abdullah Al-Hammadi (UAE)	12
16	Nguyễn Phước Đến (VIE)	13
9	Dmitriy Alexanin (KAZ)	15
24	Korakote Juengamnuaychai (THA)	9
25	Roman Petrov (KGZ)	14
8	Fong Hoi Sun (HKG)	13
21	Fayzulla Alimov (UZB)	15
12	Mohammad Rezaei (IRI)	10
13	Ruslan Kurbanov (KAZ)	15
20	Mohd Roslan Mohamad (MAS)	9

Round of 16
1	Oleg Sokolov (UZB)	9
16	Nguyễn Phước Đến (VIE)	15
9	Dmitriy Alexanin (KAZ)	15
25	Roman Petrov (KGZ)	10
5	Jung Jin-sun (KOR)	15
21	Fayzulla Alimov (UZB)	10
13	Ruslan Kurbanov (KAZ)	15
4	Lan Minghao (CHN)	13

Quarterfinals
16	Nguyễn Phước Đến (VIE)	7
9	Dmitriy Alexanin (KAZ)	15
5	Jung Jin-sun (KOR)	15
13	Ruslan Kurbanov (KAZ)	14

Semifinals
9	Dmitriy Alexanin (KAZ)	15
5	Jung Jin-sun (KOR)	12

==== Bottom half ====
Round of 32
19	Mohammad Esmaeili (IRI)	6
14	Khasan Baudunov (KGZ)	15
11	Park Sang-young (KOR)	15
22	Derry Renanda Putra Siahaan (INA)	9
7	Kazuyasu Minobe (JPN)	15
26	Ryan Pratama (INA)	8
23	Bayarsaikhany Batkhüü (MGL)	9
10	Joshua Koh (MAS)	15
15	Mohammed Al-Shamari (QAT)	7
18	Nguyễn Tiến Nhật (VIE)	15

Round of 16
3	Shi Gaofeng (CHN)	15
14	Khasan Baudunov (KGZ)	9
11	Park Sang-young (KOR)	15
6	Ho Wai Hang (HKG)	8
7	Kazuyasu Minobe (JPN)	15
10	Joshua Koh (MAS)	10
18	Nguyễn Tiến Nhật (VIE)	13
2	Koki Kano (JPN)	15

Quarterfinals
3	Shi Gaofeng (CHN)	9
11	Park Sang-young (KOR)	15
7	Kazuyasu Minobe (JPN)	6
2	Koki Kano (JPN)	15

Semifinals
11	Park Sang-young (KOR)	15
2	Koki Kano (JPN)	11

== Final standing ==
Rank	Athlete
1st place, gold medalist(s)	Dmitriy Alexanin (KAZ)
2nd place, silver medalist(s)	Park Sang-young (KOR)
3rd place, bronze medalist(s)	Jung Jin-sun (KOR)
3rd place, bronze medalist(s)	Koki Kano (JPN)
5	Shi Gaofeng (CHN)
6	Kazuyasu Minobe (JPN)
7	Ruslan Kurbanov (KAZ)
8	Nguyễn Phước Đến (VIE)
9	Oleg Sokolov (UZB)
10	Lan Minghao (CHN)
11	Ho Wai Hang (HKG)
12	Joshua Koh (MAS)
13	Khasan Baudunov (KGZ)
14	Nguyễn Tiến Nhật (VIE)
15	Fayzulla Alimov (UZB)
16	Roman Petrov (KGZ)
17	Fong Hoi Sun (HKG)
18	Mohammad Rezaei (IRI)
19	Mohammed Al-Shamari (QAT)
20	Abdullah Al-Hammadi (UAE)
21	Mohammad Esmaeili (IRI)
22	Mohd Roslan Mohamad (MAS)
23	Derry Renanda Putra Siahaan (INA)
24	Bayarsaikhany Batkhüü (MGL)
25	Korakote Juengamnuaychai (THA)
26	Ryan Pratama (INA)
27	Thanwa Chantharapidok (THA)
28	Paul Vag-Urminsky (CAM)
29	Enkhtsogtyn Dölgöön (MGL)
30	Mohammed Mirzaei (QAT)
31	Ali Saeeduddin (PAK)
32	Nazar Abbas Bhatti (PAK)
—	Abdulaziz Al-Shatti (KUW)
