= Wushu at the 2014 Asian Games – Women's sanda 52 kg =

Women's sanda 52 kg at the 2014 Asian Games
- Venue: Ganghwa Dolmens Gymnasium
- Dates: 20–24 September 2014
- Competitors: 14 from 14 nations

Medalists
| gold medal | Zhang Luan | China |
| silver medal | Elaheh Mansourian | Iran |
| bronze medal | Kim Hye-bin | South Korea |
| bronze medal | Yumnam Sanathoi Devi | India |

The women's sanda 52 kilograms competition at the 2014 Asian Games in Incheon, South Korea was held from 20 September to 24 September at the Ganghwa Dolmens Gymnasium.

A total of fourteen competitors from fourteen countries competed in this event, limited to fighters whose body weight was less than 52 kilograms.

Sanda is an unsanctioned fight which is a Chinese self-defense system and combat sport. Amateur Sanda allows kicks, punches, knees (not to the head), and throws.

Zhang Luan from China won the gold medal after beating Elaheh Mansourian of Iran in gold medal bout 2–0 in two rounds, Zhang won both periods by the same score of 5–0. The bronze medal was shared by Kim Hye-bin from South Korea and Yumnam Sanathoi Devi of India after they lost both 2–0 in the semifinals.

Divine Wally from the Philippines, Jharana Gurung from Nepal, Albina Mambetova from Kyrgyzstan and Sangidorjiin Amgalanjargal from Mongolia shared the fifth place. Athletes from Hong Kong, Turkmenistan, Indonesia, Vietnam, Pakistan and Uzbekistan lost in the first round and didn't advance.

== Schedule ==
All times are Korea Standard Time (UTC+09:00)

| Date | Time | Event |
|---|---|---|
| Saturday, 20 September 2014 | 19:00 | Round of 16 |
| Monday, 22 September 2014 | 19:00 | Quarterfinals |
| Tuesday, 23 September 2014 | 19:00 | Semifinals |
| Wednesday, 24 September 2014 | 15:00 | Final |

== Results ==
Round of 16
Chao Ho Yee (HKG) | 0
Divine Wally (PHI) | 2
Jharana Gurung (NEP) | 2
Aýgül Rahymowa (TKM) | 0
Elaheh Mansourian (IRI) | 2
Priscilla Hertati Lumban Gaol (INA) | 0
Zhang Luan (CHN) | 2
Nguyễn Thu Hoài (VIE) | 0
Hiba Moazzam (PAK) | 0
Albina Mambetova (KGZ) | 2
Yumnam Sanathoi Devi (IND) | 2
Mubarak Kamalova (UZB) | 0

Quarterfinals
Kim Hye-bin (KOR) | 2
Divine Wally (PHI) | 0
Jharana Gurung (NEP) | 0
Elaheh Mansourian (IRI) | 2
Zhang Luan (CHN) | 2
Albina Mambetova (KGZ) | 0
Yumnam Sanathoi Devi (IND) | 2
Sangidorjiin Amgalanjargal (MGL) | 0

Semifinals
Kim Hye-bin (KOR) | 0
Elaheh Mansourian (IRI) | 2
Zhang Luan (CHN) | 2
Yumnam Sanathoi Devi (IND) | 0

Final
Elaheh Mansourian (IRI) | 0
Zhang Luan (CHN) | 2
