= Wushu at the 2010 Asian Games – Women's sanshou 52 kg =

Women's sanshou 52 kg at the 2010 Asian Games
- Venue: Nansha Gymnasium
- Dates: 13–17 November 2010
- Competitors: 12 from 12 nations

Medalists
gold medal	E Meidie	China
silver medal	Nguyễn Thị Bích	Vietnam
bronze medal	Elaheh Mansourian	Iran
bronze medal	Lee Jung-hee	South Korea

The women's sanshou 52 kilograms competition at the 2010 Asian Games in Guangzhou, China was held from 13 November to 17 November at the Nansha Gymnasium.

A total of twelve competitors from twelve countries competed in this event, limited to fighters whose body weight was less than 52 kilograms.

E Meidie from China won the gold medal after beating Nguyễn Thị Bích of Vietnam in gold medal bout 2–0. The bronze medal was shared by Elaheh Mansourian from Iran and Lee Jung-hee from South Korea.

Athletes from the Philippines (Mary Jane Estimar), Nepal (Elina Chaudhary), Bangladesh (Eti Islam) and India (Yumnam Sanathoi Devi) shared the fifth place.

== Schedule ==
All times are China Standard Time (UTC+08:00)

Date	Time	Event
Saturday, 13 November 2010	19:30	Round of 16
Sunday, 14 November 2010	19:30	Quarterfinals
Tuesday, 16 November 2010	19:30	Semifinals
Wednesday, 17 November 2010	19:30	Final

== Results ==
Legend

- AV — Absolute victory
- KO — Won by knockout

Round of 16
Nguyễn Thị Bích (VIE)	2
Choe Hyang-hui (PRK)	0
Zahra Oriya (AFG)
Elaheh Mansourian (IRI)	KO
Samar Shas (YEM)
Lee Jung-hee (KOR)	AV
Khammai Lathsavong (LAO)	0
Yumnam Sanathoi Devi (IND)	2

Quarterfinals
Elina Chaudhary (NEP)	0
Nguyễn Thị Bích (VIE)	2
Elaheh Mansourian (IRI)	2
Mary Jane Estimar (PHI)	0
Eti Islam (BAN)	0
Lee Jung-hee (KOR)	2
Yumnam Sanathoi Devi (IND)	0
E Meidie (CHN)	2

Semifinals
Nguyễn Thị Bích (VIE)	2
Elaheh Mansourian (IRI)	0
Lee Jung-hee (KOR)	0
E Meidie (CHN)	2

Final
Nguyễn Thị Bích (VIE)	0
E Meidie (CHN)	2
