= Taekwondo at the 2018 Asian Games – Women's 49 kg =

Taekwondo competition

Women's 49 kg at the 2018 Asian Games
- Venue: Jakarta Convention Center
- Date: 23 August 2018
- Competitors: 17 from 17 nations

Medalists
| gold medal | Panipak Wongpattanakit | Thailand |
| silver medal | Madinabonu Mannopova | Uzbekistan |
| bronze medal | Nahid Kiani | Iran |
| bronze medal | Miyu Yamada | Japan |

The women's flyweight (49 kilograms) event at the 2018 Asian Games took place on 23 August 2018 at Jakarta Convention Center Plenary Hall, Jakarta, Indonesia.

== Schedule ==
All times are Western Indonesia Time (UTC+07:00)

| Date | Time | Event |
|---|---|---|
| Thursday, 23 August 2018 | 09:00 | Round of 32 |
| Thursday, 23 August 2018 | 09:00 | Round of 16 |
| Thursday, 23 August 2018 | 09:00 | Quarterfinals |
| Thursday, 23 August 2018 | 15:00 | Semifinals |
| Thursday, 23 August 2018 | 15:00 | Final |

== Results ==
=== Final ===
| Final |
| Panipak Wongpattanakit (THA) | 21 |
| Madinabonu Mannopova (UZB) | 3 |

=== Top half ===
Round of 32
Dhean Titania Fajrin (INA) | 4
Hung Yu-ting (TPE) | 13

Round of 16
Panipak Wongpattanakit (THA) | 26
Hung Yu-ting (TPE) | 1
Ana Belo (TLS) | 2
Kang Bo-ra (KOR) | 45
Ainur Yesbergenova (KAZ) | 17
Jessica Canabal (PHI) | 18
Ashmita Khadka (NEP) | 4
Nahid Kiani (IRI) | 43

Quarterfinals
Panipak Wongpattanakit (THA) | 27
Kang Bo-ra (KOR) | 8
Jessica Canabal (PHI) | 15
Nahid Kiani (IRI) | 23

Semifinals
Panipak Wongpattanakit (THA) | 11
Nahid Kiani (IRI) | 6

=== Bottom half ===
Round of 32

Round of 16
Wenren Yuntao (CHN) | 7
Anna El-Haddad (LBN) | 8
Madinabonu Mannopova (UZB) | 20
Lam Siu Wai (HKG) | 8
Sidra Batool (PAK) | 14
Kumudu Wijerathna (SRI) | 28
Miyu Yamada (JPN) | 35
Trương Thị Kim Tuyền (VIE) | 27

Quarterfinals
Anna El-Haddad (LBN) | 5
Madinabonu Mannopova (UZB) | 11
Kumudu Wijerathna (SRI) | 8
Miyu Yamada (JPN) | 32

Semifinals
Madinabonu Mannopova (UZB) | 14
Miyu Yamada (JPN) | 11
