= Wushu at the 2022 Asian Games – Women's jianshu & qiangshu =

Women's jianshu & qiangshu at the 2022 Asian Games
- Venue: Xiaoshan Guali Sports Centre
- Dates: 27 September 2023
- Competitors: 11 from 11 nations

Medalists
gold medal	Lai Xiaoxiao	China
silver medal	Zahra Kiani	Iran
bronze medal	Dương Thúy Vi	Vietnam

The women's jianshu and qiangshu competition at the 2022 Asian Games was held on 27 September 2023 at Xiaoshan Guali Sports Centre in Hangzhou, China.

== Schedule ==
All times are China Standard Time (UTC+08:00)

Date	Time	Event
Wednesday, 27 September 2023	09:00	Jianshu
Wednesday, 27 September 2023	14:30	Qiangshu

== Results ==
Rank	Athlete	Jianshu	Qiangshu	Total
1st place, gold medalist(s)	Lai Xiaoxiao (CHN)	9.800	9.800	19.600
2nd place, silver medalist(s)	Zahra Kiani (IRI)	9.720	9.716	19.436
3rd place, bronze medalist(s)	Dương Thúy Vi (VIE)	9.700	9.726	19.426
4	Seo Hee-ju (KOR)	9.713	9.710	19.423
5	Nandhira Mauriskha (INA)	9.700	9.700	19.400
6	Lydia Sham (HKG)	9.716	9.610	19.326
7	Pang Pui Yee (MAS)	9.703	9.573	19.276
8	Nanoha Kida (JPN)	9.433	9.700	19.133
9	Sandy Oo (MYA)	9.266	9.670	18.936
10	Peng Yu-hsi (TPE)	9.500	9.423	18.923
11	Kabita Thapa (NEP)	9.633	9.243	18.876
