= Wushu at the 2018 Asian Games – Women's jianshu & qiangshu =

Women's jianshu & qiangshu at the 2018 Asian Games
- Venue: Jakarta International Expo
- Dates: 19–21 August 2018
- Competitors: 7 from 7 nations

Medalists
gold medal	Guo Mengjiao	China
silver medal	Zahra Kiani	Iran
bronze medal	Dương Thúy Vi	Vietnam

The women's Jianshu / Qiangshu all-round competition at the 2018 Asian Games in Jakarta, Indonesia was held from 19 August to 21 August at the JIExpo Kemayoran Hall B3.

== Schedule ==
All times are Western Indonesia Time (UTC+07:00)

Date	Time	Event
Sunday, 19 August 2018	09:00	Jianshu
Tuesday, 21 August 2018	09:00	Qiangshu

== Results ==
Legend

- DNS — Did not start

Rank	Athlete	Jianshu	Qiangshu	Total
1st place, gold medalist(s)	Guo Mengjiao (CHN)	9.75	9.74	19.49
2nd place, silver medalist(s)	Zahra Kiani (IRI)	9.70	9.71	19.41
3rd place, bronze medalist(s)	Dương Thúy Vi (VIE)	9.70	9.70	19.40
4	Phoon Eyin (MAS)	9.58	9.68	19.26
5	Keiko Yamaguchi (JPN)	9.67	9.57	19.24
6	Lydia Sham (HKG)	9.67	9.40	19.07
—	Seo Hee-ju (KOR)			DNS
