= Guo Mengjiao =

Chinese wushu practitioner

Personal information
- Born: January 12, 1996 (age 30)
- Education: Shanghai Maritime University
- Height: 1.6 m (5 ft 3 in)
- Weight: 53 kg (117 lb)

Sport
- Sport: Wushu
- Event(s): Changquan, Jianshu, Qiangshu
- Team: Hebei Wushu Team
Medal record
Women's Wushu Taolu
Representing China
World Championships
Gold medal – first place	2019 Shanghai	Changquan
Gold medal – first place	2019 Shanghai	Jiti
Asian Games
Gold medal – first place	2018 Jakarta-Palembang	Jianshu+Qiangshu
Asian Championships
Gold medal – first place	2016 Taoyuan City	Qiangshu
Asian Junior Championships
Gold medal – first place	2013 Manila	Changquan

Guo Mengjiao (Chinese: 郭梦娇; pinyin: Guōmèngjiāo; born January 12, 1996) is a wushu taolu athlete from China.

Her first major international appearance was at the 2018 Asian Games where she won the gold medal in women's jianshu and qiangshu. At the 2019 World Wushu Championships, Guo faced difficulties with her jianshu and qiangshu routines, but was able to win and become the world champion in changquan. She also competed with the rest of the China wushu team in the group-set event and won another gold medal.

== See also ==
- List of Asian Games medalists in wushu
