= Rowing at the 2018 Asian Games – Women's lightweight double sculls =

Women's lightweight double sculls at the 2018 Asian Games
- Venue: Jakabaring Lake
- Date: 20–24 August 2018
- Competitors: 12 from 6 nations

Medalists
gold medal	Liang Guoru; Wu Qiang	China
silver medal	Nazanin Rahmani; Maryam Omidi Parsa	Iran
bronze medal	Matinee Raruen; Phuttharaksa Neegree	Thailand

The women's lightweight double sculls competition at the 2018 Asian Games in Palembang, Indonesia, was held from 20 August to 24 August at the JSC Lake.

== Schedule ==
All times are Western Indonesia Time (UTC+07:00)

Date	Time	Event
Monday, 20 August 2018	09:50	Preliminary race
Friday, 24 August 2018	10:05	Final

== Results ==
=== Preliminary race ===
- Qualification: 1–6 → Final (FA)

Rank	Team	Time	Notes
1	China (CHN); Liang Guoru; Wu Qiang	7:42.83	FA
2	Iran (IRI); Nazanin Rahmani; Maryam Omidi Parsa	7:50.87	FA
3	Japan (JPN); Miharu Takashima; Hinako Takimoto	7:59.22	FA
4	Thailand (THA); Matinee Raruen; Phuttharaksa Neegree	8:08.56	FA
5	Korea (COR); Song Ji-sun; Kim Un-hui	8:16.16	FA
6	Chinese Taipei (TPE); Chen Qing-xuan; Chen Chia-yi	8:21.24	FA

=== Final ===
Rank	Team	Time
1st place, gold medalist(s)	China (CHN); Liang Guoru; Wu Qiang	7:40.24
2nd place, silver medalist(s)	Iran (IRI); Nazanin Rahmani; Maryam Omidi Parsa	7:48.38
3rd place, bronze medalist(s)	Thailand (THA); Matinee Raruen; Phuttharaksa Neegree	7:54.23
4	Japan (JPN); Miharu Takashima; Hinako Takimoto	7:57.15
5	Chinese Taipei (TPE); Chen Qing-xuan; Chen Chia-yi	8:16.71
6	Korea (COR); Song Ji-sun; Kim Un-hui	8:17.45
