= Lai Xiaoxiao =

Chinese wushu practitioner

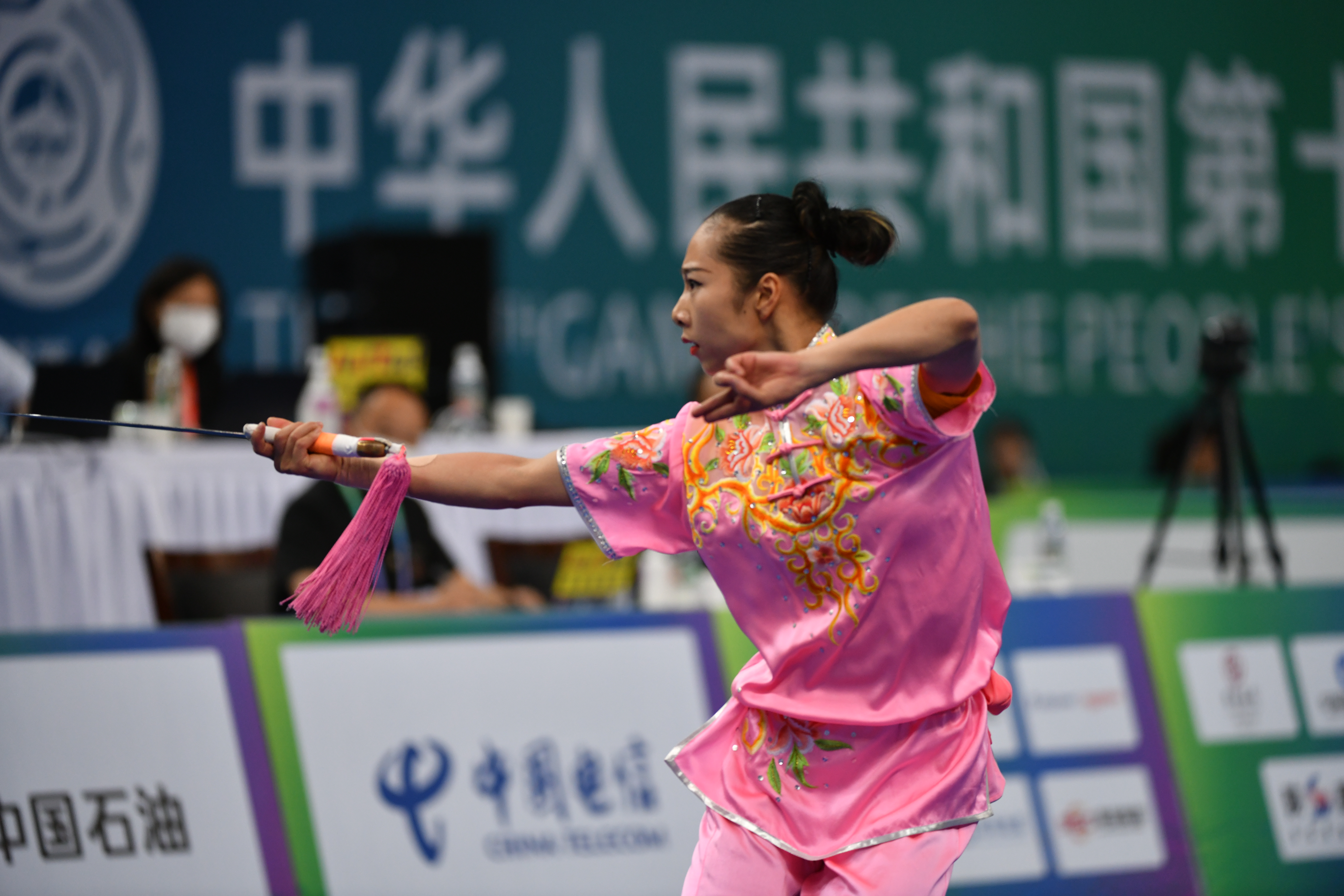
- Lai Xiaoxiao performing jianshu at the 2021 National Games of China

Personal information
- Born: December 3, 1993 (age 32) Guangde, Anhui, China
- Height: 1.66 m (5 ft 5 1/2 in)
- Weight: 49 kg (108 lb; 7.7 st)
- Website: Official Website

Sport
- Sport: Wushu
- Events: Changquan, Jianshu, Qiangshu
- Team: Anhui Wushu Team
Medal record
Representing China
Women's Wushu Taolu
World Games
Gold medal – first place	2022 Birmingham	Changquan
World Championships
Gold medal – first place	2015 Jakarta	Qiangshu
Asian Games
Gold medal – first place	2022 Hangzhou	Jianshu+Qiangshu
World Cup
Gold medal – first place	2016 Fuzhou	Qiangshu
World Traditional Championships
Gold medal – first place	2014 Chizhou	Shuangjian

Lai Xiaoxiao (Chinese: 赖晓晓; pinyin: lài xiǎo xiǎo; born December 3, 1993), also known as Sunny Lai, is a retired professional wushu taolu athlete from Anhui, China.

== Early life and education ==
Lai was born in Guangde, Anhui Province in December, 1993. At the age of seven, she was sent to Zhenlong Primary School in Guangde County to practice wushu and later joined the Anhui provincial wushu team on December 1, 2003. She was transferred to the Anhui Provincial Sports School as well. After graduating from the Provincial Sports School, Lai enrolled in East China University of Science and Technology and graduated with a bachelor's degree in 2017. In 2019, she enrolled in Anhui Normal University to pursue a master's degree in sports education.

== Career ==
Lai made her major international debut at the 2015 World Wushu Championships in Jakarta, Indonesia, where she became the world champion in women's qiangshu. She also won a gold medal in qiangshu at the 2016 Taolu World Cup in Fuzhou, China. The following year, she competed in the 2017 National Games of China and won the silver medal in women's changquan all-around. In the 2021 National Games of China, Lai became the women's changquan all-around champion.

At the 2022 World Games, Lai won the gold medal in women's changquan. In September 2023, she won the gold medal in the women's jianshu and qiangshu competition at the 2022 Asian Games in Hangzhou.

== Competitive history ==
Year	Event	CQ	JS	QS	AA	YZQ	SJ
Junior
2008	National Youth Championships			1st place, gold medalist(s)			
Senior
2009	National Games	?	?	?	?		
2013	National Championships	1st place, gold medalist(s)		1st place, gold medalist(s)			
2013	National Games	?	?	?	?		
2014	National Championships	1st place, gold medalist(s)		1st place, gold medalist(s)			
2014	World Traditional Championships						1st place, gold medalist(s)
2015	World Championships			1st place, gold medalist(s)			
2016	National Kungfu Championships					1st place, gold medalist(s)	1st place, gold medalist(s)
2016	National Championships						
2016	World Cup			1st place, gold medalist(s)			
2017	National Kungfu Championships					1st place, gold medalist(s)	1st place, gold medalist(s)
2017	National Games	?	?	?	2nd place, silver medalist(s)		
2018	National Kungfu Championships					1st place, gold medalist(s)	1st place, gold medalist(s)
2018	National Championships		1st place, gold medalist(s)	1st place, gold medalist(s)			
2019	National Kungfu Championships					1st place, gold medalist(s)	1st place, gold medalist(s)
2019	National Championships	1st place, gold medalist(s)	1st place, gold medalist(s)				
2020	did not compete due to COVID-19 pandemic						
2021	National Games	4	1	1	1st place, gold medalist(s)		
2022	World Games	1st place, gold medalist(s)					
2023	Asian Games		1	1	1st place, gold medalist(s)		

== See also ==
- China national wushu team
