= Naorem Roshibina Devi =

Indian wushu athlete (born 2000)

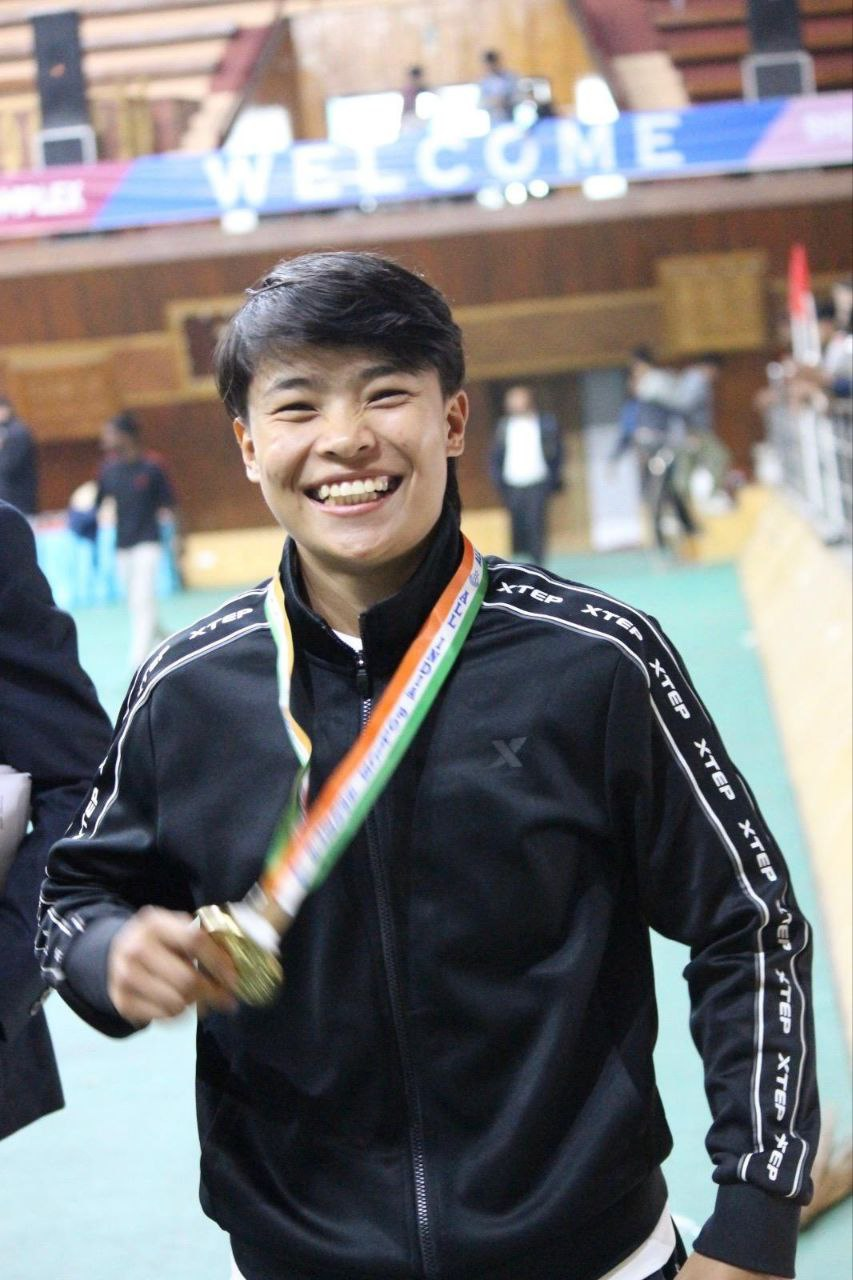
- Roshibina in 2026

Personal information
- Born: 30 December 2000 (age 25) Kwasiphai, Manipur, India

Sport
- Sport: Wushu
- Weight class: 60 kg
- Event: Sanda
Medal record
Women's wushu (sanda)
Representing India
Asian Games
Silver medal – second place	2022 Hangzhou	60 kg
Silver medal – second place	2026 Aichi–Nagoya	60 kg
Bronze medal – third place	2018 Jakarta	60 kg
South Asian Games
Gold medal – first place	2019 Kathmandu	60 kg
World Junior Championships
Silver medal – second place	2016 Burgas	48 kg
Asian Junior Championships
Gold medal – first place	2017 Gumi	48 kg

Naorem Roshibina Devi (born 30 December 2000) is an Indian wushu athlete who competes in the sanda discipline.

== Career ==
Roshibina won silver medal at the 2016 World Junior Championships in Burgas and gold medal at the 2017 Asian Junior Championships in Gumi.

In the 2018 Asian Games in Jakarta, she competed in the women's 60 kg sanda. She defeated Mubashra Akhtar of Pakistan in the quarter-finals, which assured her a medal. She lost to Cai Yingying of China in the semi-finals, and was jointly awarded a bronze medal.

She won a silver in the women's 60 kg sanda at the 2022 Asian Games, Hangzhou. She lost to Wu Xiaowei of China.

In September 2026, she won the silver again in the women's 60 kg sanda at the 2026 Asian Games in Nagoya.

== Awards ==
She was conferred the Arjuna Award for 2023.
