= Wushu at the 2022 Asian Games – Women's sanda 60 kg =

Women's sanda 60 kg at the 2022 Asian Games
- Venue: Xiaoshan Guali Sports Centre
- Dates: 25–28 September 2023
- Competitors: 8 from 8 nations

Medalists
gold medal	Wu Xiaowei	China
silver medal	Naorem Roshibina Devi	India
bronze medal	Nguyễn Thị Thu Thuỷ	Vietnam
bronze medal	Shahrbanoo Mansourian	Iran

The women's sanda 60 kilograms competition at the 2022 Asian Games in Hangzhou, China was held from 25 to 28 September 2023 at the Xiaoshan Guali Sports Centre.

== Schedule ==
All times are China Standard Time (UTC+08:00)

Date	Time	Event
Monday, 25 September 2023	19:30	Quarterfinals
Wednesday, 27 September 2023	19:30	Semifinals
Thursday, 28 September 2023	09:30	Final

== Results ==
Legend

- PD — Won by point difference

Quarterfinals
Naorem Roshibina Devi (IND)	PD
Aiman Karshyga (KAZ)
Nguyễn Thị Thu Thuỷ (VIE)	PD
Maira Karamat (PAK)
Gözel Rahmedowa (TKM)
Shahrbanoo Mansourian (IRI)	PD
Wu Xiaowei (CHN)	PD
Hou Min-wen (TPE)

Semifinals
Naorem Roshibina Devi (IND)	2
Nguyễn Thị Thu Thuỷ (VIE)	0
Shahrbanoo Mansourian (IRI)	0
Wu Xiaowei (CHN)	2

Final
Naorem Roshibina Devi (IND)	0
Wu Xiaowei (CHN)	2
