= Wushu at the 2018 Asian Games – Women's sanda 60 kg =

Women's sanda 60 kg at the 2018 Asian Games
- Venue: Jakarta International Expo
- Dates: 19–23 August 2018
- Competitors: 10 from 10 nations

Medalists
gold medal	Cai Yingying	China
silver medal	Shahrbanoo Mansourian	Iran
bronze medal	Suchaya Bualuang	Thailand
bronze medal	Naorem Roshibina Devi	India

The women's sanda 60 kilograms competition at the 2018 Asian Games in Jakarta, Indonesia was held from 19 August to 23 August at the JIExpo Kemayoran Hall B3.

Sanda is an unsanctioned fight is a Chinese self-defense system and combat sport. Amateur Sanda allows kicks, punches, knees (not to the head), and throws.

A total of ten competitors from ten countries competed in this event, limited to fighters whose body weight was less than 60 kilograms.

Cai Yingying from China won the gold medal after beating Shahrbanoo Mansourian of Iran in gold medal bout 2–0. The bronze medal was shared by Suchaya Bualuang from Thailand and Naorem Roshibina Devi of India.

== Schedule ==
All times are Western Indonesia Time (UTC+07:00)

Date	Time	Event
Sunday, 19 August 2018	19:00	Round of 16
Tuesday, 21 August 2018	19:00	Quarterfinals
Wednesday, 22 August 2018	19:00	Semifinals
Thursday, 23 August 2018	10:00	Final

== Results ==
Legend

- PD — Won by point difference
- RET — Won by retirement

Round of 16
Lin Yi-ju (TPE)	1
Chu Thị Thúy Hằng (VIE)	2
Cai Yingying (CHN)	RET
Peuy Manivan (LAO)

Quarterfinals
Shahrbanoo Mansourian (IRI)	PD
Chu Thị Thúy Hằng (VIE)
Lumanti Shrestha (NEP)
Suchaya Bualuang (THA)	PD
Mubashra Akhtar (PAK)	0
Naorem Roshibina Devi (IND)	2
Cai Yingying (CHN)	2
Mei Yulia Nengsih Kurniati (INA)	0

Semifinals
Shahrbanoo Mansourian (IRI)	PD
Suchaya Bualuang (THA)
Naorem Roshibina Devi (IND)
Cai Yingying (CHN)	PD

Final
Shahrbanoo Mansourian (IRI)	0
Cai Yingying (CHN)	2
