= Wushu at the 2026 Asian Games – Women's sanda 60 kg =

Women's sanda 60 kg at the 2026 Asian Games
- Venue: Aichi Budokan
- Dates: 21–24 September 2026
- Competitors: 15 from 15 nations

Medalists
gold medal	Zhang Xiaoyu	China
silver medal	Naorem Roshibina Devi	India
bronze medal	Nguyễn Thị Thu Thuỷ	Vietnam
bronze medal	Thania Kusumaningtyas	Indonesia

The women's sanda 60 kilograms competition at the 2026 Asian Games in Nagoya, Japan was held from 21 to 24 September 2026 at the Aichi Prefectural Martial Arts Hall.

Competition bouts consist of 3 rounds in total, each lasting two minutes with a one-minute rest period between rounds. The athlete who scores more points in each round is the winner of that rounds; the bout ends when one athlete has won two rounds (and thus the match).

A total of fifteen competitors from fifteen countries (NOCs) competed in this event, limited to fighters whose body weight was less than 60 kilograms.

Zhang Xiaoyu from China won the gold medal after beating Naorem Roshibina Devi from India in the final in two rounds. Nguyễn Thị Thu Thuỷ from Vietnam and Thania Kusumaningtyas of Indonesia shared the bronze medals.

== Schedule ==
All times are Japan Standard Time (UTC+09:00)

Date	Time	Event
Monday, 21 September 2026	18:00	1/8 finals
Tuesday, 22 September 2026	18:00	Quarterfinals
Wednesday, 23 September 2026	18:00	Semifinals
Thursday, 24 September 2026	09:30	Final

== Results ==
Legend

- PD — Won by point difference

1/8 finals
Diana Rahimi (IRI)	0
Zhang Xiaoyu (CHN)	2
Rita Thakulla (NEP)	0
Merjen Joraýewa (TKM)	2
Nguyễn Thị Thu Thuỷ (VIE)	2
Alina Shossova (KAZ)	0
Shika Khatun (BAN)
Naorem Roshibina Devi (IND)	PD
Chu Man Sin (MAC)	2
Shin Chae-yeon (KOR)	0
Shakhzoda Azatova (UZB)	PD
Lkhagvyn Michidmaa (MGL)
Ainazik Rustambek Kyzy (KGZ)	0
Thania Kusumaningtyas (INA)	2

Quarterfinals
Lin Tsai-mei (TPE)
Zhang Xiaoyu (CHN)	PD
Merjen Joraýewa (TKM)
Nguyễn Thị Thu Thuỷ (VIE)	PD
Naorem Roshibina Devi (IND)	PD
Chu Man Sin (MAC)
Shakhzoda Azatova (UZB)	0
Thania Kusumaningtyas (INA)	2

Semifinals
Zhang Xiaoyu (CHN)	PD
Nguyễn Thị Thu Thuỷ (VIE)
Naorem Roshibina Devi (IND)	2
Thania Kusumaningtyas (INA)	0

Final
Zhang Xiaoyu (CHN)	2
Naorem Roshibina Devi (IND)	0
