= Rowing at the 2018 Asian Games – Women's double sculls =

Women's double sculls at the 2018 Asian Games
- Venue: Jakabaring Lake
- Date: 19–23 August 2018
- Competitors: 12 from 6 nations

Medalists
gold medal	Jiang Yan; Li Jingjing	China
silver medal	Kim Seul-gi; Kim Ye-ji	South Korea
bronze medal	Maryam Karami; Parisa Ahmadi	Iran

The women's double sculls competition at the 2018 Asian Games was held on 19–23 August at the JSC Lake.

== Schedule ==
All times are Western Indonesia Time (UTC+07:00)

Date	Time	Event
Sunday, 19 August 2018	10:15	Preliminary race
Thursday, 23 August 2018	10:25	Final

== Results ==
=== Preliminary race ===
- Qualification: 1–6 → Final (FA)

Rank	Team	Time	Notes
1	China (CHN); Jiang Yan; Li Jingjing	7:51.04	FA
2	South Korea (KOR); Kim Ye-ji; Kim Seul-gi	7:55.81	FA
3	Iran (IRI); Maryam Karami; Parisa Ahmadi	8:07.72	FA
4	Japan (JPN); Sayaka Chujo; Shiho Yonekawa	8:17.81	FA
5	Kazakhstan (KAZ); Alina Mochula; Mariya Poida	8:35.97	FA
6	India (IND); Sayali Rajendra Shelke; Pooja Sangwan	8:50.48	FA

=== Final ===
Rank	Team	Time
1st place, gold medalist(s)	China (CHN); Jiang Yan; Li Jingjing	7:33.55
2nd place, silver medalist(s)	South Korea (KOR); Kim Seul-gi; Kim Ye-ji	7:34.73
3rd place, bronze medalist(s)	Iran (IRI); Maryam Karami; Parisa Ahmadi	7:35.45
4	Japan (JPN); Sayaka Chujo; Shiho Yonekawa	7:51.05
5	Kazakhstan (KAZ); Alina Mochula; Mariya Poida	8:01.95
6	India (IND); Sayali Rajendra Shelke; Pooja Sangwan	8:21.76
