= Melika Boroun =

Iranian canoe polo player (born 1998)

Personal information
- Nationality: Persian
- Born: 9 January 1998 (age 28) Esfahan, (Iran)
- Height: 163 cm (5 ft 4 in)
- Weight: 60 kg (132 lb)

Sport
- Country: Iran
- Sport: Canoe Polo
Medal record
Representing Iran
Women's Canoe Polo
Asian Games
Gold medal – first place	2018 Jakarta	Team
Asian Canoe Polo Championships
Silver medal – second place	2017 Malaysia	Team
Asian Canoe Polo Championships
Gold medal – first place	2015 Hong Kong	Team

Melika Boroun (Persian: ملیکا برون; born 9 January 1998 in Isfahan, Iran) is an Iranian canoe polo player and a member of the Iran women’s national canoe polo team. She gained international recognition after becoming the top scorer of the 2025 Canoe Polo World Games in China while representing the Isfahan Khoroushan team.

== Early life ==
Boroun began practicing canoe polo at the age of eleven. After spending five years competing in both canoe polo and canoe slalom, she decided to focus exclusively on canoe polo and pursue a professional career in the sport. Her performances eventually led to her selection for the Iran women’s national canoe polo team. In 2015, Boroun finished as the top scorer of the Asian Junior Canoe Polo Championships.

== See also ==
- Canoe polo at the 2018 Asian Games
- Iran at the 2018 Asian Games
