= Canoe polo at the 2018 Asian Games =

- Venue: Jakabaring Aquatic Stadium
- Date: 27–29 August 2018
- Competitors: 90 from 8 nations

Canoe polo were featured at the 2018 Asian Games as a demonstration sport, meaning medals won in this sport would not be counted in the official overall medal tally. It was held from 27 to 29 August 2018.

== Medalists ==
Event	Gold	Silver	Bronze
Men	Japan; Yuuki Horie; Hiroki Horiuchi; Takayuki Igawa; Ryota Kimura; Katsuyuki Shibata; Takahiko Yanagi	Malaysia; Faizal Abdul Jalil; Muhd Irfan Abu; Amirul Azfar Azwan; Amirudin Shuib; Haikal Suliaman; Naqiuddin Taha	Chinese Taipei; Chao Tzu-hsing; Chien Shao-hung; Hsiao Wei-chen; Huang Teng-hui; Li Yong-xu; Wu Tung-yang
Women	Iran; Melika Boroun; Taraneh Kamyab; Delaram Marzabadi; Shiva Molavinia; Elaheh Pourabdian; Saba Rahmati	Singapore; Gracie Chua; Leow Fang Hui; Kasxier Low; Chad Ong; Ong Shu Wen; Tan Li Ling	Chinese Taipei; Chien Chi-yun; Fu Yu-ting; Hung Yi-fang; Lee Heng-yen; Liao Wan-ru; Tsai An-chi

== Medal table ==
Rank	Nation	Gold	Silver	Bronze	Total
1	Iran (IRI)	1	0	0	1
1	Japan (JPN)	1	0	0	1
3	Malaysia (MAS)	0	1	0	1
3	Singapore (SGP)	0	1	0	1
5	Chinese Taipei (TPE)	0	0	2	2
Totals (5 entries)		2	2	2	6

== Results ==
=== Men ===
==== Qualification round ====
27–28 August

===== Group A =====
Pos	Team	Pld	W	D	L	GF	GA	GD	Pts	MAS	IRI	SGP	INA
1	Malaysia	3	2	0	1	24	7	+17	6	—	4–3	3–4	17–0
2	Iran	3	2	0	1	24	7	+17	6	3–4	—	4–2	17–1
3	Singapore	3	2	0	1	22	7	+15	6	4–3	2–4	—	16–0
4	Indonesia	3	0	0	3	1	50	−49	0	0–17	1–17	0–16	—

Source: Results

===== Group B =====
Pos	Team	Pld	W	D	L	GF	GA	GD	Pts	JPN	TPE	THA	HKG
1	Japan	3	3	0	0	52	4	+48	9	—	7–4	21–0	24–0
2	Chinese Taipei	3	2	0	1	41	10	+31	6	4–7	—	15–3	22–0
3	Thailand	3	1	0	2	12	38	−26	3	0–21	3–15	—	9–2
4	Hong Kong	3	0	0	3	2	55	−53	0	0–24	0–22	2–9	—

Source: Results

==== Loser pool ====
28 August

Pos	Team	Pld	W	D	L	GF	GA	GD	Pts	SGP	THA	INA	HKG
1	Singapore	3	3	0	0	56	3	+53	9	—	13–2	20–1	23–0
2	Thailand	3	2	0	1	15	17	−2	6	2–13	—	5–3	8–1
3	Indonesia	3	1	0	2	15	26	−11	3	1–20	3–5	—	11–1
4	Hong Kong	3	0	0	3	2	42	−40	0	0–23	1–8	1–11	—

Source: Results

==== Final round ====
Semifinals
28 August
Malaysia	6
Chinese Taipei	3
28 August
Iran	8
Japan	9

Final
29 August
Malaysia	2
Japan	8
Bronze medal match
29 August
Chinese Taipei (OT)	4
Iran	3

=== Women ===
==== Qualification round ====
27 August

===== Group A =====
Pos	Team	Pld	W	D	L	GF	GA	GD	Pts	TPE	JPN	THA	HKG
1	Chinese Taipei	3	3	0	0	35	5	+30	9	—	7–2	15–1	13–2
2	Japan	3	2	0	1	26	11	+15	6	2–7	—	9–3	15–1
3	Thailand	3	1	0	2	17	28	−11	3	1–15	3–9	—	13–4
4	Hong Kong	3	0	0	3	7	41	−34	0	2–13	1–15	4–13	—

Source: Results

===== Group B =====
Pos	Team	Pld	W	D	L	GF	GA	GD	Pts	SGP	IRI	MAS
1	Singapore	2	2	0	0	20	3	+17	6	—	3–2	17–1
2	Iran	2	1	0	1	21	3	+18	3	2–3	—	19–0
3	Malaysia	2	0	0	2	1	36	−35	0	1–17	0–19	—

Source: Results

==== Loser pool ====
28 August

Pos	Team	Pld	W	D	L	GF	GA	GD	Pts	THA	MAS	HKG
1	Thailand	2	2	0	0	17	4	+13	6	—	6–1	11–3
2	Malaysia	2	1	0	1	8	10	−2	3	1–6	—	7–4
3	Hong Kong	2	0	0	2	7	18	−11	0	3–11	4–7	—

Source: Results

==== Final round ====
Semifinals
28 August
Chinese Taipei	3
Iran	6
28 August
Japan	1
Singapore	4

Final
29 August
Iran	5
Singapore	2
Bronze medal match
29 August
Chinese Taipei	11
Japan	3
