= Elaheh Mansourian =

Iranian wushu athlete

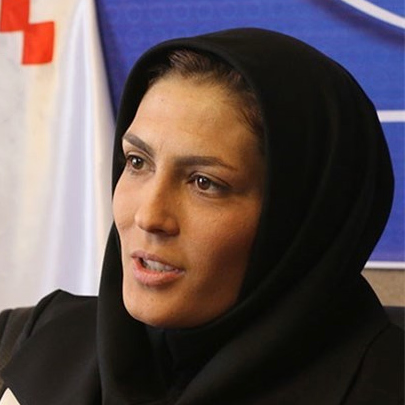
- Mansourian in 2014

Personal information
- Nationality: Iranian
- Born: 21 September 1991 (age 34) Semirom, Isfahan Province, Iran
- Height: 168 cm (5 ft 6 in)
- Weight: 52 kg (115 lb)

Sport
- Country: Iran
- Sport: Wushu
- Event: Sanda
- Coached by: Layla Bandani
Medal record
Representing Iran
World Championships
Gold medal – first place	2013 Kuala Lumpur	52 kg
Gold medal – first place	2017 Kazan	52 kg
Gold medal – first place	2019 Shanghai	65 kg
Silver medal – second place	2009 Toronto	48 kg
Bronze medal – third place	2011 Ankara	48 kg
Asian Games
Bronze medal – third place	2010 Guangzhou	52 kg
Silver medal – second place	2014 Incheon	52 kg
Silver medal – second place	2018 Jakarta	52 kg
Silver medal – second place	2022 Hangzhou	52 kg
Asian Championships
Gold medal – first place	2016 Taoyuan	56 kg

Elaheh Mansourian (Persian: الهه منصوریان, born 21 September 1991, Semirom, Isfahan) is an Iranian wushu athlete who competes in the sanda 52 and 65 kg divisions. She held the world title in 2013, 2017 and 2019 and won three medals at the Asian Games in 2014–2018.

Her sisters Shahrbanoo and Soheila Mansourian are also world champions in wushu.

== Kickboxing record ==
Professional Kickboxing record
Date	Result	Opponent	Event	Location	Method	Round	Time
2021-09-25	Win	(China) Wu Yi	Wu Lin Feng 2021: WLF in Tangshan	Tangshan, China	TKO	1	
2021-05-29	Win	(China) Zhang Meng	Wu Lin Feng 2021: World Contender League 4th Stage	Zhengzhou, China	Decision (Unanimous)	3	3:00
Legend: Win Loss Draw/No contest Notes

== See also ==
- Shahrbanoo Mansourian
- Soheila Mansourian
