= Zahra Kiani =

Iranian wushu athlete

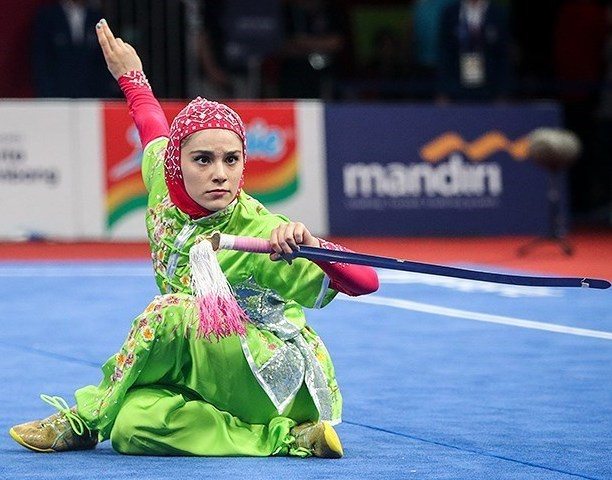
- Zahra Kiani at the 2018 Asian Games

Personal information
- Full name: Zahra Kiani Harchegani زهرا کیانی هرچگانی
- Born: 26 September 1999 (age 27) Harchegan, Chaharmahal and Bakhtiari province, Iran
- Height: 1.65 m (5 ft 5 in)
- Weight: 50 kg (110 lb)

Sport
- Country: Iran
- Sport: Wushu
- Events: Changquan Jianshu, Qiangshu
- Team: Sepahan Wushu Team
- Coached by: Mahboubeh Karimi
Medal record
Representing Iran
Women's Wushu Taolu
World Championships
Gold medal – first place	2025 Brasília	Qiangshu
Silver medal – second place	2015 Jakarta	Changquan (Compulsory)
Bronze medal – third place	2017 Kazan	Jianshu
Bronze medal – third place	2019 Shanghai	Changquan
World Cup
Silver medal – second place	2016 Fuzhou	Changquan
Bronze medal – third place	2016 Fuzhou	Jianshu
International Wushu Invitational Tournament
Gold medal – first place	2024 Jiangyin	Changquan
Gold medal – first place	2024 Jiangyin	Qiangshu
Asian Games
Silver medal – second place	2018 Jakarta-Palembang	Jianshu+Qiangshu
Silver medal – second place	2022 Hangzhou	Jianshu+Qiangshu
Asian Championships
Gold medal – first place	2024 Macau	Changquan
Gold medal – first place	2024 Macau	Jianshu
Bronze medal – third place	2024 Macau	Duilian
World Junior Championships
Gold medal – first place	2014 Antalya	Changquan (B)
Gold medal – first place	2014 Antalya	Jianshu (B)
Gold medal – first place	2016 Burgas	Changquan (A)
Gold medal – first place	2016 Burgas	Qiangshu (A)
Silver medal – second place	2010 Singapore	Jianshu (C)
Silver medal – second place	2016 Burgas	Jianshu (B)
Bronze medal – third place	2014 Antalya	Qiangshu (B)
Asian Junior Championships
Gold medal – first place	2011 Shanghai	Jianshu (C)
Gold medal – first place	2015 Xilinhot	Changquan (A)
Gold medal – first place	2015 Xilinhot	Qiangshu (A)
Silver medal – second place	2011 Shanghai	Changquan (C)
Silver medal – second place	2013 Manila	Jianshu (B)
Silver medal – second place	2015 Xilinhot	Jianshu (A)
Bronze medal – third place	2013 Manila	Changquan (B)

Zahra Kiani Harchegani (Persian: زهرا کیانی هرچگانی; born September 26, 1999) is a wushu taolu athlete from Iran. She is a four-time world junior champion and a silver medalist at the Asian Games in 2018 (jianshu and qiangshu discipline).

== Career ==
=== Junior ===
Kiani's first major international competition was at the 2010 World Junior Wushu Championships where she earned the silver medal in girl's group C jianshu. She then made her debut at the Asian Junior Wushu Championships in 2011 where she won a gold medal in jianshu and a silver medal in jianshu. Two years later at the 2013 Asian Junior Wushu Championships, she earned a silver medal in jianshu and a bronze medal in changquan. A year later at the 2014 World Junior Wushu Championships, she won two gold medals and a bronze medal. Kiani then won two gold medals and a silver medal at the 2015 Asian Junior Wushu Championships and achieved the same medals at the 2016 World Junior Wushu Championships. Her last junior competition was the 2017 Asian Junior Championships she won gold medals in qiangshu and duilian and a bronze medal in jianshu.

=== Senior ===
Kiani made her senior international debut the following year at the 2015 World Wushu Championships, she won the silver medal in compulsory changquan. With her high placements at the world championships, Kiani qualified for the 2016 Taolu World Cup where she earned a silver medal in changquan and a bronze medal in jianshu. A year later at the 2017 World Wushu Championships, she earned another bronze medal in jianshu. At the 2018 Asian Games, Kiani won the silver medal in women's jianshu and qiangshu combined, the first medal for Iran in wushu taolu at the Asian Games. over a year later, she competed at the 2019 World Wushu Championships where she won a bronze medal in changquan.

After the start of the COVID-19 pandemic, Kiani's first major appearance was at the 2022 Asian Games (held in 2023) where she won the silver medal in women's jianshu and qiangshu combined. Shortly after, she competed at the 2023 World Combat Games and won the silver medal in women's jianshu and qiangshu combined. Unable to take part in the 2023 World Wushu Championships due to visa issues, Kiani competed in the 2024 International Wushu Invitational Tournament where she won gold medals in changquan and qiangshu. A few months later, she became a two-time Asian champion and bronze medalist at the 2024 Asian Wushu Championships.

== See also ==
- List of Asian Games medalists in wushu
