= Shi Gaofeng =

Chinese fencer

Personal information
- Full name: Shi Gaofeng
- Nationality: Chinese

Sport
- Rank: 106
- Coached by: Hugues Obry

Shi Gaofeng (born 16 January 1992) is a Chinese fencer.

Gaofeng began fencing when he was about 12 years old. He was later scouted by a fencing coach after he joined the Nantong Sport School. He is right-handed and is an épée fencer.

He was one of 406 athletes chosen to represent China at the 2020 Tokyo Summer Olympics, as part of the Men's Épée Team.
