= Ashmita Khadka =

Nepalese taekwondo player (born 1997)

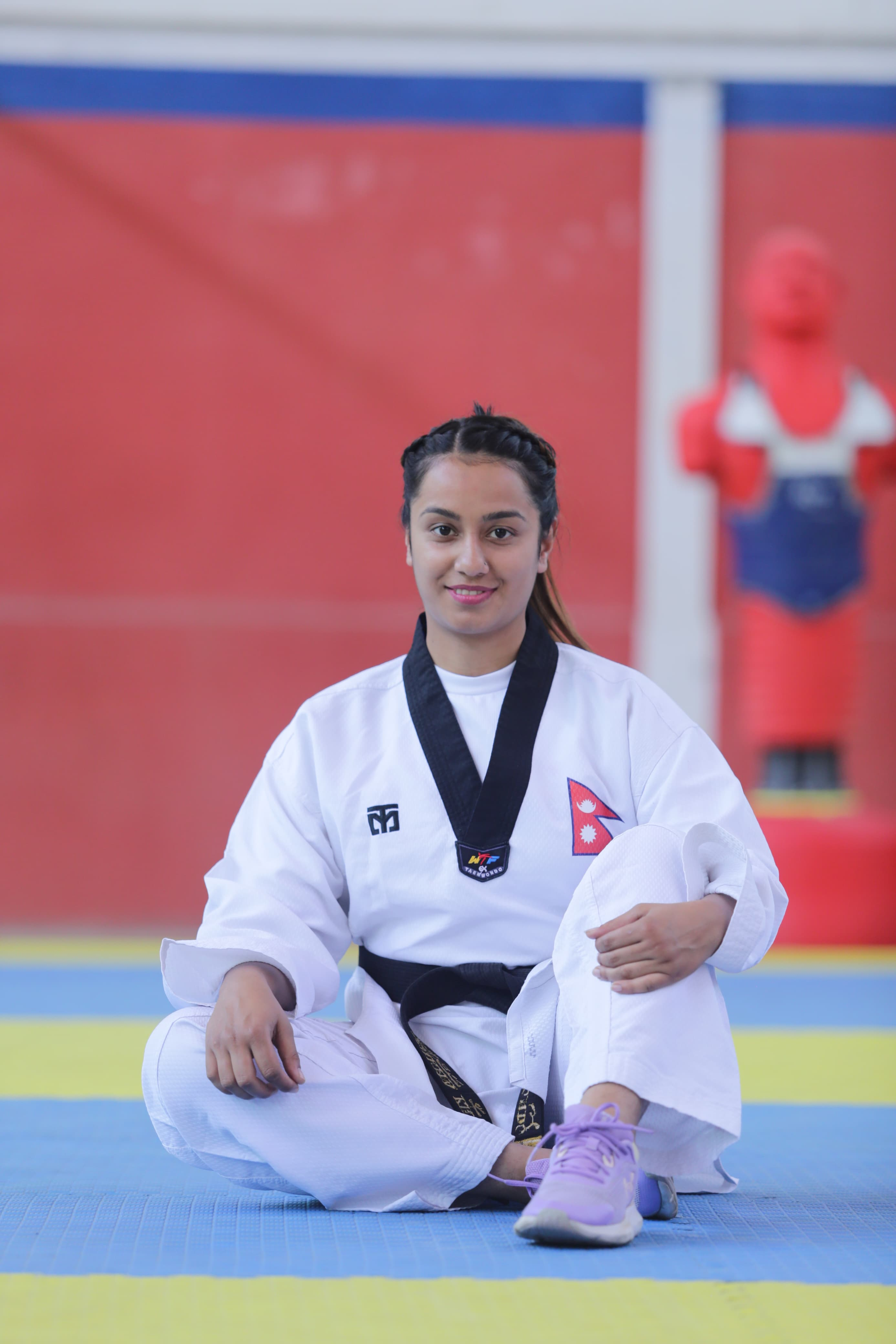
- Taekwondo Athlete Ashmita Khadka

Personal information
- Full name: Ashmita Khadka
- Nationality: Nepalese
- Born: 31 July 1997 (age 29) Kathmandu, Nepal
- Height: 1.72 m (5 ft 7 1/2 in)
- Weight: 53 kg (117 lb)
- Spouse: Bikesh Bidari

Sport
- Sport: Taekwondo
- Coached by: Norbu Lama
Medal record
Representing Nepal
Sarawak Chief Minister Borneo Cup Sarawak, Malaysia 2015
Gold medal – first place	2014 Nepal	kyorugi
Sarawak Chief minister Borneo Cup Sarawak, Malaysia 2015 (Poomsae)
Silver medal – second place	2015 Malaysia	Poomsae
19th Asian cities Taekwondo Championship
Silver medal – second place	2015 Hongkong	Kyorugi
The 3rd International Taekwondo Championship Bhutan 2017
Gold medal – first place	2017 Bhutan	kyorugi
1st Women International Taekwondo Championship
Gold medal – first place	2017 Nepal	kyorugi
World Taekwondo Malaysia Open – G1 Malaysia (G1)
Bronze medal – third place	2018 Malaysia	kyorugi
International Open FriendshipTaekwondo Championship
Gold medal – first place	2018 Nepal	kyorugi
Pohang World University Taekwondo Competition and open Competition
Silver medal – second place	2018 Korea	kyorugi
Pohang World University Taekwondo Competition and open Competition
Silver medal – second place	2018 Korea	Team kyorugi
2019 South Asian Games
Bronze medal – third place	2019 Nepal	kyorugi

Ashmita Khadka (Nepali: अस्मिता खड्का, born 31 July 1997) is a Nepali taekwondo practitioner. She has won numerous national championships. She was born in Kathmandu. She won a bronze medal at the 2019 South Asian Games.

== Career ==
Khadka started her international career winning a gold medal at the Sarawak Chief Minister Borneo cup held in Kuching, Sarawak, Malaysia Ashmita has represented Nepal at the 2018 Asian Games held in Indonesia. Ashmita's other achievements include winning bronze at the Malaysian Open-G1 which is a WT ranked tournament. She has also won silver medal at the World University Championship held in Korea.

She won the Nepal National and International Players Association (NNIPA) Player of the Year award for Taekwondo in 2018, one of the highest-ranked awards in Nepalese Sports. She was also the UUNTF Player of the year 2018. Ashmita has represented Nepal at the 2017 Universiade and 2019 Universiade, one of the biggest tournaments for student-athletes.

== Coaching and International Referees career ==
Ashmita is actively working as a coach for Armed Police Force and has completed her WT International Coach Certification Course Level I. Khadka is also actively working as an International referee and has received Best Referee award at the Asian Invitational and 2025 Maanshaan Open Taekwondo championship held in China After completing her WT International Poomsae Course, she was appointed as an assistant trainer at the Kathmandu District Poomsae seminar 2025 which was inaugurated by Former Health minister and Member of parliament Gagan Thapa.
