= Yumnam Sanathoi Devi =

Indian wushu athlete

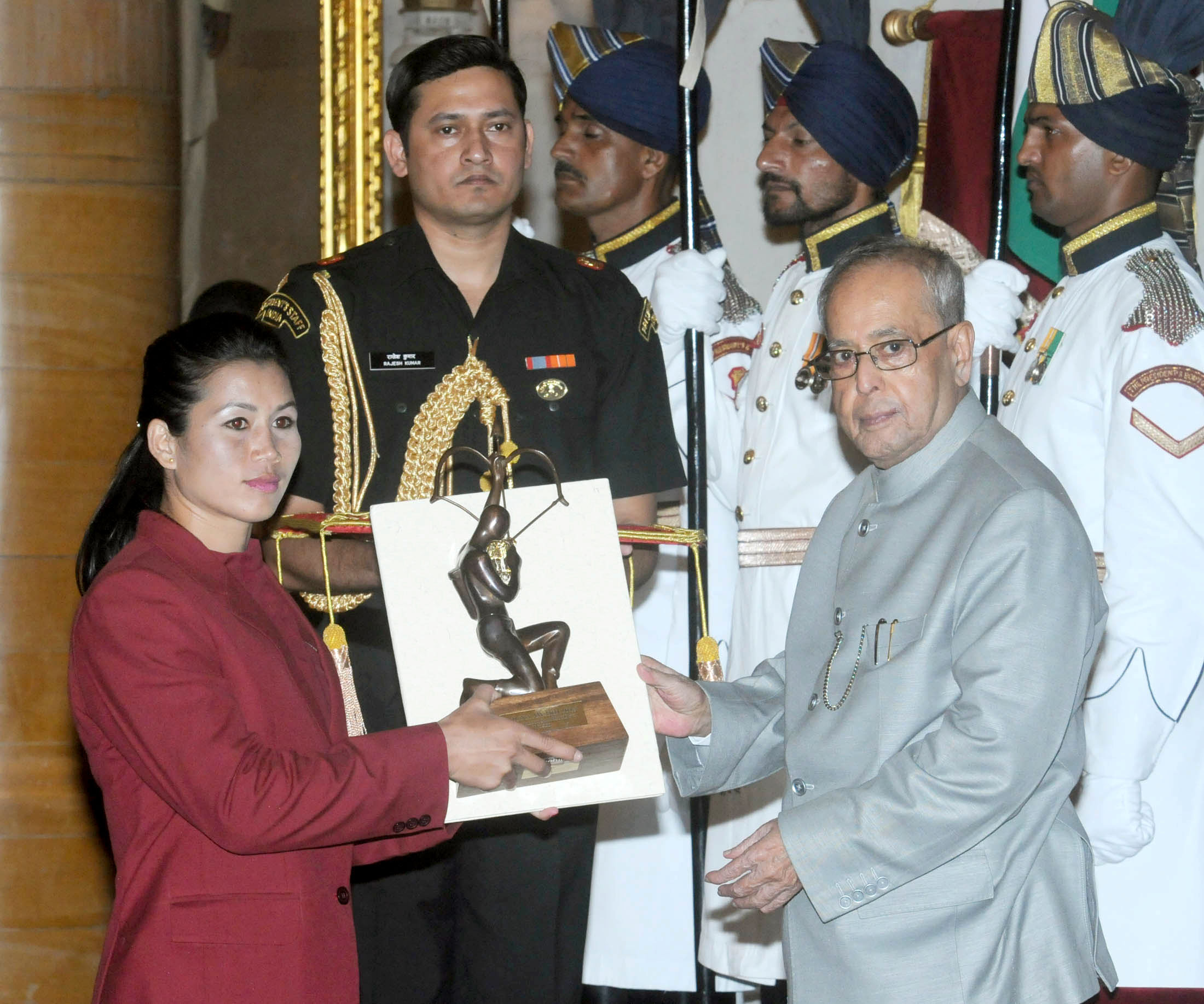
- The President, Pranab Mukherjee presenting the Arjuna Award for the year-2015 to Y. Sanathoi Devi for Wushu.

Personal information
- Nationality: Indian
- Born: 1 February 1989 (age 37) Yairipok, Manipur, India
- Weight: 52 kg (115 lb)

Sport
- Country: India
- Sport: Wushu
- Event: Sanda
Medal record
Women's Sanda
Representing India
World Championships
Silver medal – second place	2011 Ankara	48 kg
Silver medal – second place	2013 Kuala Lumpur	48 kg
Silver medal – second place	2015 Jakarta	52 kg
Silver medal – second place	2019 Shanghai	52 kg

Yumnam Sanathoi Devi is an Indian Wushu player, martial artist and athlete. She was awarded the Arjuna Award by the Ministry of Youth Affairs and Sports, Government of India in 2015 for Wushu. She won a bronze medal at the 2014 Incheon Asian Games. She also won a bronze medal in the 2014 World Cup held at Indonesia and a silver medal in World Championships in 2011 and 2013. She won the bronze medal in the 13th World Wushu Championships in November 2015. In 2016, Devi won a silver for India in 52 kg category at the 8th Sanda World Cup, held in Xi'an, China.

She hails from Yairipok Top Chingtha village in Thoubal district of Manipur, India. She took up traditional Chinese martial arts Wushu in 2003 under the guidance of Maibam Surbala Devi and later under Moirangthem Ibomcha Meitei.

== Awards ==
She was awarded by the Government of India, the prestigious Arjuna Award in 2015.
