= List of Asian Games medalists in ju-jitsu =

Asian Games medalists

The following people have medaled in ju-jitsu at the Asian Games from 2018 to 2022.

== Men's jiu-jitsu ==
=== 56 kg ===
Games	Gold	Silver	Bronze
2018 Jakarta–Palembang	Hamad Nawad (UAE)	Khalid Al-Blooshi (UAE)	Nurzhan Seiduali (KAZ)
2018 Jakarta–Palembang	Hamad Nawad (UAE)	Khalid Al-Blooshi (UAE)	Kemal Meredow (TKM)

=== 62 kg ===
Games	Gold	Silver	Bronze
2018 Jakarta–Palembang	Darkhan Nortayev (KAZ)	Omar Al-Fadhli (UAE)	Freeh Al-Harahsheh (JOR)
2018 Jakarta–Palembang	Darkhan Nortayev (KAZ)	Omar Al-Fadhli (UAE)	Said Al-Mazrouei (UAE)
2022 Hangzhou	Khaled Al-Shehi (UAE)	Khalid Al-Blooshi (UAE)	Mansur Khabibulla (KAZ)
2022 Hangzhou	Khaled Al-Shehi (UAE)	Khalid Al-Blooshi (UAE)	Abdulmalik Al-Murdhi (KSA)

=== 69 kg ===
Games	Gold	Silver	Bronze
2018 Jakarta–Palembang	Torokan Bagynbai Uulu (KGZ)	Talib Al-Kirbi (UAE)	Nartay Kazhekov (KAZ)
2018 Jakarta–Palembang	Torokan Bagynbai Uulu (KGZ)	Talib Al-Kirbi (UAE)	Banpot Lertthaisong (THA)
2022 Hangzhou	Nurzhan Batyrbekov (KAZ)	Mohamed Al-Suwaidi (UAE)	Aldiyar Serik (KAZ)
2022 Hangzhou	Nurzhan Batyrbekov (KAZ)	Mohamed Al-Suwaidi (UAE)	Joo Seong-hyeon (KOR)

=== 77 kg ===
Games	Gold	Silver	Bronze
2018 Jakarta–Palembang	Ruslan Israilov (KAZ)	None awarded	Abdelkarim Al-Rasheed (JOR)
2018 Jakarta–Palembang	Ruslan Israilov (KAZ)	None awarded	Mohamed Al-Qubaisi (UAE)
2022 Hangzhou	Koo Bon-cheol (KOR)	Ali Munfaredi (BRN)	Mönkhtöriin Davaadorj (MGL)
2022 Hangzhou	Koo Bon-cheol (KOR)	Ali Munfaredi (BRN)	Mahdi Al-Awlaqi (UAE)

=== 85 kg ===
Games	Gold	Silver	Bronze
2018 Jakarta–Palembang	Haidar Al-Rasheed (JOR)	Khalfan Balhol (UAE)	Abdurahmanhaji Murtazaliev (KGZ)
2018 Jakarta–Palembang	Haidar Al-Rasheed (JOR)	Khalfan Balhol (UAE)	Murtazali Murtazaliev (KGZ)
2022 Hangzhou	Faisal Al-Ketbi (UAE)	Kim Hee-seoung (KOR)	Omar Nada (KSA)
2022 Hangzhou	Faisal Al-Ketbi (UAE)	Kim Hee-seoung (KOR)	Saeed Al-Kubaisi (UAE)

=== 94 kg ===
Games	Gold	Silver	Bronze
2018 Jakarta–Palembang	Faisal Al-Ketbi (UAE)	Zaid Granduke (JOR)	Rizat Makhashev (KAZ)
2018 Jakarta–Palembang	Faisal Al-Ketbi (UAE)	Zaid Granduke (JOR)	Hwang Myeng-se (KOR)

== Women's jiu-jitsu ==
=== 48 kg ===
- 49 kg: 2018

Games	Gold	Silver	Bronze
2018 Jakarta–Palembang	Jessa Khan (CAM)	Mahra Al-Hinaai (UAE)	Meggie Ochoa (PHI)
2018 Jakarta–Palembang	Jessa Khan (CAM)	Mahra Al-Hinaai (UAE)	Dương Thị Thanh Minh (VIE)
2022 Hangzhou	Meggie Ochoa (PHI)	Balqees Abdulla (UAE)	Kacie Tan (THA)
2022 Hangzhou	Meggie Ochoa (PHI)	Balqees Abdulla (UAE)	Phùng Thị Huệ (VIE)

=== 52 kg ===
Games	Gold	Silver	Bronze
2022 Hangzhou	Asma Al-Hosani (UAE)	Miao Jie (CHN)	Park Jeong-hye (KOR)
2022 Hangzhou	Asma Al-Hosani (UAE)	Miao Jie (CHN)	Kaila Napolis (PHI)

=== 57 kg ===
Games	Gold	Silver	Bronze
2022 Hangzhou	Annie Ramirez (PHI)	Galina Duvanova (KAZ)	Orapa Senatham (THA)
2022 Hangzhou	Annie Ramirez (PHI)	Galina Duvanova (KAZ)	Shamsa Al-Ameri (UAE)

=== 63 kg ===
- 62 kg: 2018

Games	Gold	Silver	Bronze
2018 Jakarta–Palembang	Sung Ki-ra (KOR)	Constance Lien (SGP)	Yara Kakish (JOR)
2018 Jakarta–Palembang	Sung Ki-ra (KOR)	Constance Lien (SGP)	Tsogkhüügiin Udval (MGL)
2022 Hangzhou	Shamma Al-Kalbani (UAE)	Sung Ki-ra (KOR)	Marian Urdabayeva (KAZ)
2022 Hangzhou	Shamma Al-Kalbani (UAE)	Sung Ki-ra (KOR)	Choi Hee-joo (KOR)
