= Ju-jitsu at the 2018 Asian Games =

2018 Asian Games

- Venue: Jakarta Convention Center
- Dates: 24–26 August 2018
- Competitors: 196 from 28 nations

Ju-jitsu at the 2018 Asian Games was held at the Jakarta Convention Center Assembly Hall, Jakarta, Indonesia, from 24 to 26 August 2018. The competition included only jiu-jitsu (ne-waza) events.

== Schedule ==
P	Preliminary rounds & Repechage	F	Finals

Event↓/Date →	24th Fri		25th Sat		26th Sun	
Men's 56 kg	P	F				
Men's 62 kg			P	F		
Men's 69 kg	P	F				
Men's 77 kg					P	F
Men's 85 kg					P	F
Men's 94 kg			P	F		
Women's 49 kg	P	F				
Women's 62 kg			P	F		

== Medalists ==
=== Men ===
Event	Gold	Silver	Bronze
−56 kg	Hamad Nawad; United Arab Emirates	Khalid Al-Blooshi; United Arab Emirates	Nurzhan Seiduali; Kazakhstan
−56 kg	Hamad Nawad; United Arab Emirates	Khalid Al-Blooshi; United Arab Emirates	Kemal Meredow; Turkmenistan
−62 kg	Darkhan Nortayev; Kazakhstan	Omar Al-Fadhli; United Arab Emirates	Said Al-Mazrouei; United Arab Emirates
−62 kg	Darkhan Nortayev; Kazakhstan	Omar Al-Fadhli; United Arab Emirates	Freeh Al-Harahsheh; Jordan
−69 kg	Torokan Bagynbai Uulu; Kyrgyzstan	Talib Al-Kirbi; United Arab Emirates	Banpot Lertthaisong; Thailand
−69 kg	Torokan Bagynbai Uulu; Kyrgyzstan	Talib Al-Kirbi; United Arab Emirates	Nartay Kazhekov; Kazakhstan
−77 kg	Ruslan Israilov; Kazakhstan	None awarded	Mohamed Al-Qubaisi; United Arab Emirates
−77 kg	Ruslan Israilov; Kazakhstan	None awarded	Abdelkarim Al-Rasheed; Jordan
−85 kg	Haidar Al-Rasheed; Jordan	Khalfan Balhol; United Arab Emirates	Abdurahmanhaji Murtazaliev; Kyrgyzstan
−85 kg	Haidar Al-Rasheed; Jordan	Khalfan Balhol; United Arab Emirates	Murtazali Murtazaliev; Kyrgyzstan
−94 kg	Faisal Al-Ketbi; United Arab Emirates	Zaid Granduke; Jordan	Rizat Makhashev; Kazakhstan
−94 kg	Faisal Al-Ketbi; United Arab Emirates	Zaid Granduke; Jordan	Hwang Myeng-se; South Korea

=== Women ===
Event	Gold	Silver	Bronze
−49 kg	Jessa Khan; Cambodia	Mahra Al-Hinaai; United Arab Emirates	Meggie Ochoa; Philippines
−49 kg	Jessa Khan; Cambodia	Mahra Al-Hinaai; United Arab Emirates	Dương Thị Thanh Minh; Vietnam
−62 kg	Sung Ki-ra; South Korea	Constance Lien; Singapore	Yara Kakish; Jordan
−62 kg	Sung Ki-ra; South Korea	Constance Lien; Singapore	Tsogkhüügiin Udval; Mongolia

== Medal table ==
Rank	Nation	Gold	Silver	Bronze	Total
1	United Arab Emirates (UAE)	2	5	2	9
2	Kazakhstan (KAZ)	2	0	3	5
3	Jordan (JOR)	1	1	3	5
4	Kyrgyzstan (KGZ)	1	0	2	3
5	South Korea (KOR)	1	0	1	2
6	Cambodia (CAM)	1	0	0	1
7	Singapore (SGP)	0	1	0	1
8	Mongolia (MGL)	0	0	1	1
8	Philippines (PHI)	0	0	1	1
8	Thailand (THA)	0	0	1	1
8	Turkmenistan (TKM)	0	0	1	1
8	Vietnam (VIE)	0	0	1	1
Totals (12 entries)		8	7	16	31

== Participating nations ==
A total of 196 athletes from 28 nations competed in ju-jitsu at the 2018 Asian Games:

- Afghanistan (7)
- Bahrain (5)
- Cambodia (2)
- China (2)
- Chinese Taipei (3)
- Indonesia (16)
- Iran (10)
- Iraq (2)
- Jordan (12)
- Kazakhstan (15)
- Kuwait (4)
- Kyrgyzstan (11)
- Lebanon (1)
- Mongolia (15)
- Pakistan (4)
- Palestine (3)
- Philippines (9)
- Saudi Arabia (3)
- Singapore (7)
- South Korea (2)
- Syria (2)
- Tajikistan (3)
- Thailand (14)
- Turkmenistan (11)
- United Arab Emirates (15)
- Uzbekistan (10)
- Vietnam (4)
- Yemen (4)
