= Mongolia at the 2018 Asian Games =

- IOC code: MGL
- NOC: Mongolian National Olympic Committee
- Website: www.olympic.mn

in Jakarta and Palembang August 18 – September 2
- Flag bearer: Natsagsürengiin Zolboo
- Medals Ranked 17th: Gold 5 Silver 9 Bronze 11 Total 25

Asian Games appearances (overview)
- 1974; 1978; 1982; 1986; 1990; 1994; 1998; 2002; 2006; 2010; 2014; 2018; 2022; 2026

Mongolia is participating in the 2018 Asian Games in Jakarta and Palembang, Indonesia from 18 August to 2 September 2018. Mongolia made its first appearance at the Asian Games in 1974 Tehran, and have a total 137 medals, including 20 gold, 37 silver, and 80 bronze. At the previous edition in Incheon 2014, Mongolia had collected 21 medals, and standing in the 16th position in medals tally.

On 5 July 2018, Indonesia Asian Games Organizing Committee (Inasgoc) stated that Mongolia withdrew in its participation in all team events at the Games, by an official letter from the Mongolian National Olympic Committee.

== Medalists ==
The following Mongolia competitors won medals at the Games.

Medal	Name	Sport	Event	Date
Gold	Erdenebatyn Bekhbayar	Wrestling	Men's freestyle 57 kg	19 Aug
~~Gold~~	~~Pürevdorjiin Orkhon~~	~~Wrestling~~	~~Women's freestyle 62 kg~~	~~20 Aug~~
Gold	Gankhuyagiin Nandinzayaa	Shooting	Women's 50 metre rifle three positions	22 Aug
Gold	Ganbaataryn Narantsetseg	Sambo	Women's 48 kg	31 Aug
Gold	Erdenebatyn Tsendbaatar	Boxing	Men's 60 kg	1 Sep
Silver	Sharkhüügiin Tümentsetseg	Wrestling	Women's freestyle 68 kg	21 Aug
Silver	Chuluunbadrakhyn Narantuyaa	Shooting	Women's 50 metre rifle three positions	22 Aug
Silver	Bayarbatyn Baasanjargal	Kurash	Women's 63 kg	29 Aug
Silver	Otgony Mönkhtsetseg	Kurash	Women's 78 kg	30 Aug
Silver	Gantulgyn Altanbagana	Judo	Men's 90 kg	31 Aug
Silver	Ölziibayaryn Düürenbayar	Judo	Men's +100 kg	31 Aug
Silver	Baasansürengiin Oidovchimed	Sambo	Women's 48 kg	31 Aug
Silver	Shaaluugiin Erdenebaatar	Sambo	Men's 52 kg	31 Aug
Silver	Baatarsükh Chinzorig	Boxing	Men's 64 kg	1 Sep
Bronze	Orgodolyn Üitümen	Wrestling	Men's freestyle 86 kg	19 Aug
Bronze	Gankhuyagiin Nandinzayaa	Shooting	Women's 10 metre air rifle	20 Aug
Bronze	Erdenechimegiin Sumiyaa	Wrestling	Women's freestyle 53 kg	20 Aug
Bronze	Altantsetsegiin Battsetseg	Wrestling	Women's freestyle 57 kg	20 Aug
Bronze	Tsogkhuu Udval	Ju-jitsu	Women's 62 kg	25 Aug
Bronze	Mönkhbatyn Urantsetseg	Judo	Women's 48 kg	29 Aug
Bronze	Dorjsürengiin Sumiyaa	Judo	Women's 57 kg	30 Aug
Bronze	Tsend-Ayuushiin Naranjargal	Judo	Women's 70 kg	30 Aug
Bronze	Otgonbaataryn Uuganbaatar	Judo	Men's 81 kg	30 Aug
Bronze	Lkhagvasürengiin Otgonbaatar	Judo	Men's 100 kg	31 Aug
Bronze	Tsog-Ochiryn Battsetseg	Sambo	Women's 68 kg	1 Sep

Medals by sport
Sport	1st place, gold medalist(s)	2nd place, silver medalist(s)	3rd place, bronze medalist(s)	Total
Boxing	1	1	0	2
Ju-jitsu	0	0	1	1
Judo	0	2	5	7
Kurash	0	2	0	2
Sambo	1	2	1	4
Shooting	1	1	1	3
Wrestling	1	1	3	5
Total	4	9	11	24

Medals by day
Day	Date	1st place, gold medalist(s)	2nd place, silver medalist(s)	3rd place, bronze medalist(s)	Total
1	August 19	1	0	1	2
2	August 20	0	0	3	3
3	August 21	0	1	0	1
4	August 22	1	1	0	2
5	August 23	0	0	0	0
6	August 24	0	0	0	0
7	August 25	0	0	1	1
8	August 26	0	0	0	0
9	August 27	0	0	0	0
10	August 28	0	0	0	0
11	August 29	0	1	1	2
12	August 30	0	1	3	4
13	August 31	1	4	1	6
14	September 1	1	1	1	3
15	September 2	0	0	0	0
Total		4	9	11	24

== Archery ==
Recurve

Athlete	Event	Ranking round		Round of 64	Round of 32	Round of 16	Quarterfinals	Semifinals	Final / BM	
Athlete	Event	Score	Seed	Opposition Score	Opposition Score	Opposition Score	Opposition Score	Opposition Score	Opposition Score	Rank
Adiyasuren Baasankhuu	Men's individual	646	32	Did not advance						
Gantugs Jantsan	Men's individual	623	52	Did not advance						
Otgonbold Baatarkhuyag	Men's individual	656	15	Bye	Muto (JPN); L 4–6	Did not advance				
Purevsuren Bataa	Men's individual	646	20	Al-Kaabi (UAE); W 6–0	Viswash (IND); L 2–6	Did not advance				
Adiyasuren Baasankhuu; Otgonbold Baatarkhuyag; Purevsuren Bataa	Men's team	1948	10	—N/a	Bye	Bangladesh; W 6–2	Kazakhstan; W 5–3	Chinese Taipei; L 0–6	China; L 0–6	4
Ariunbileg Nyamjargal	Women's individual	613	41	Did not advance						
Enkhtuya Altangerel	Women's individual	621	24	Al-Blooshi (UAE); W 6–0	Cao (CHN); L 1–7	Did not advance				
Miroslava Danzandorj	Women's individual	619	35	Did not advance						
Urantungalag Bishindee	Women's individual	642	16	Bye	Daimary (IND); W 6–2	Kang (KOR); L 3–7	Did not advance			
Enkhtuya Altangerel; Miroslava Danzandorj; Urantungalag Bishindee	Women's team	1882	10	—N/a		India; L 3–5	Did not advance			
Otgonbold Baatarkhuyag; Urantungalag Bishindee	Mixed team	1298	9	—N/a	Bye	India; W 5–4	South Korea; W 5–1	Japan; L 2–6	China; L 2–6	4

Compound

Athlete	Event	Ranking round		Round of 32	Round of 16	Quarterfinals	Semifinals	Final / BM	
Athlete	Event	Score	Seed	Opposition Score	Opposition Score	Opposition Score	Opposition Score	Opposition Score	Rank
Aldar Lkhamsuren; Enkhtuvshin Dugarjav; Shandan Ganzorig	Men's team	1890	16	—N/a	South Korea; L 205–233	Did not advance			
Batdulam Battsegseg; Enkhtamir Erdenebat; Mungunchimeg Batjargal	Women's team	1885	13	—N/a	Iran; L 203–221	Did not advance			
Aldar Lkhamsuren; Batdulam Battsetseg	Mixed team	1298	17	Laos; L 136–141	Did not advance				

== Athletics ==
Mongolia entered nine athletes (6 men's and 3 women's) to participate in the athletics competition at the Games.

== Badminton ==
Men

Athlete	Event	Round of 64	Round of 32	Round of 16	Quarterfinals	Semifinals	Final	
Athlete	Event	Opposition Score	Opposition Score	Opposition Score	Opposition Score	Opposition Score	Opposition Score	Rank
Khuvituguldur Byambajav	Singles	Bye	K Nishimoto (JPN); L (11–21, 6–21)	Did not advance				
Batdavaa Munkhbat	Singles	Pui P F (MAC); L (15–21, 21–18, 14–21)	Did not advance					
Sumiyasuren Enkhbat; Temuulen Gombodorj	Doubles	—N/a	B Shrestha / N Shrestha (NEP); L (12–21, 7–21)	Did not advance				
Khuvituguldur Byambajav; Batdavaa Munkhbat	Doubles	—N/a	F Alfian / M R Ardianto (INA); L (4–21, 7–21)	Did not advance				
Batdavaa Munkhbat; Khuvituguldur Byambajav; Sumiyasuren Enkhba; Temuulen Gombodorj	Team	—N/a		Hong Kong (HKG); WO	Did not advance			

== Basketball ==
Summary

Team	Event	Group Stage					Quarterfinal	Semifinals / Pl.	Final / BM / Pl.	
Team	Event	Opposition Score	Opposition Score	Opposition Score	Opposition Score	Rank	Opposition Score	Opposition Score	Opposition Score	Rank
Mongolia men's	Men's tournament	—N/a	Thailand; L 86−87	South Korea; L 73−108	Indonesia; W 74−69	3	Did not advance			9
Mongolia women's	Women's tournament	Hong Kong; W 83−79	Japan; L 35−107	China; L 36−110	Thailand; L 39−62	4 Q	Chinese Taipei; L 59−76	Thailand; L 51−80	Indonesia; L 66−82	8
Mongolia men's	Men's 3x3 tournament	Chinese Taipei; L 15−19	Bangladesh; W 17−13	Kyrgyzstan; W 22−15	South Korea; L 9−21	3	Did not advance			
Mongolia women's	Women's 3x3 tournament	—N/a	Japan; L 1−22	Nepal; W 12−11	Chinese Taipei; L 10−21	3	Did not advance			

=== 5x5 basketball ===
Mongolia men's and women's basketball team entered the competition, drawn in group A for the men's and in group Y for the women's.

==== Men's tournament ====
Roster

The following is the Mongolia roster in the men's basketball tournament of the 2018 Asian Games.

Mongolia men's national basketball team - 2018 Asian Games roster
Players
Coaches

Pos.	No.	Name	Age – Date of birth	Height	Club	Ctr.
G	1	Boldbaatar Bat-erdene	21 – 3 December 1996	1.83 m (6 ft 0 in)	Tanan Garid	(Mongolia)
PG	4	Sergelen Otgonbaatar	29 – 9 January 1989	1.78 m (5 ft 10 in)	Khasiin Khuleguud	(Mongolia)
	5	Anand Ariunbold	21 – 14 April 1997	1.97 m (6 ft 6 in)
	7	Dulguun Ochbadrakh	21 – 18 November 1996	1.83 m (6 ft 0 in)	Etugen Irvesuud	(Mongolia)
SG	8	Batjavkhlan Battulga	28 – 19 September 1989	1.83 m (6 ft 0 in)	Khasiin Khuleguud	(Mongolia)
G/F	9	Sanchir Tungalag	29 – 8 April 1989	1.93 m (6 ft 4 in)	Khasiin Khuleguud	(Mongolia)
G	10	Bilguun Battuvshin	29 – 2 March 1989	1.96 m (6 ft 5 in)	Khasiin Khuleguud	(Mongolia)
	11	Munkhtuvshin Davaadorj	29 – 15 May 1989	1.89 m (6 ft 2 in)	Etugen Irvesuud	(Mongolia)
C	15	Bolortulga Purevjav	31 – 16 March 1987	1.93 m (6 ft 4 in)	Tanan Garid	(Mongolia)
	19	Batbayar Narangerel	23 – 2 March 1995	1.94 m (6 ft 4 in)	Etugen Irvesuud	(Mongolia)
	23	Erdenetsogt Ochirbat	23 – 14 January 1995	1.83 m (6 ft 0 in)	Tanan Garid	(Mongolia)
C	33	Ochirbat Otgonbayar	27 – 24 February 1991	1.96 m (6 ft 5 in)	Khasiin Khuleguud	(Mongolia)

Head coach

- (Mongolia) Shiinen Sedbazar

Legend

- (C) Team captain
- (NP) Naturalized player
- Club - describes last
  club before the tournament
- Age - describes age
  on 14 August 2018

Group A

Pos	Team	Pld	W	L	PF	PA	PD	Pts	Qualification
1	South Korea	3	3	0	329	215	+114	6	Quarterfinals
2	Indonesia	3	1	2	232	264	−32	4 (Note: Tied on head-to-head wins (1). Head-to-head game points difference: INA +7, MGL +4, THA −11.)	Quarterfinals
3	Mongolia	3	1	2	233	264	−31	4	
4	Thailand	3	1	2	250	301	−51	4	

Source: OCA
Notes:

14 August
12:30

Thailand	87–86	Mongolia
Scoring by quarter: 26–14, 19–29, 23–19, 19–24
Pts: Klahan 18; Rebs: Klaewnarong, Klahan 10; Asts: Lakhan, Ananti 7		Pts: Sanchir 25; Rebs: Sanchir 13; Asts: Sergelen 6

Gelora Bung Karno Basketball Hall, Jakarta
Referees: Mohammad Doust (IRI), Kumiko Kumagai (JPN), Chen Ying-cheng (TPE)

16 August
16:00

South Korea	108–73	Mongolia
Scoring by quarter: 26–15, 30–17, 23–24, 29–17
Pts: Heo I. 20; Rebs: Ra 14; Asts: Kim S. 6		Pts: Batbayar 15; Rebs: Bilgüün 6 Asts: Sanchir, Bilgüün, Batbayar 3

Gelora Bung Karno Basketball Hall, Jakarta
Referees: Imran Ali Baig (IND), Kumiko Kumagai (JPN), Chen Ying-cheng (TPE)

25 August
18:30

Mongolia	74–69	Indonesia
Scoring by quarter: 14–18, 24–9, 21–23, 15–19
Pts: Sanchir 28; Rebs: Bolortulga 11; Asts: Sergelen, Sanchir 4		Pts: Wuwungan, Wisnu 15; Rebs: Johnson 15; Asts: Johnson 4

Gelora Bung Karno Basketball Hall, Jakarta
Referees: Yuen Chun Yip (HKG), Hadi Salem (IRI), Chen Ying-cheng (TPE)

==== Women's tournament ====
Roster

The following is the Mongolia roster in the women's basketball tournament of the 2018 Asian Games.

Mongolia women's national basketball team - 2018 Asian Games roster
Players
Coaches

Pos.	No.	Name	Age – Date of birth	Height	Club	Ctr.
G	4	Murat Bulbul	22 – 11 November 1995	1.66 m (5 ft 5 in)	Zavkhan Irvesuud	(Mongolia)
C	5	Buriad Altanzaya	31 – 17 January 1987	1.78 m (5 ft 10 in)
G	6	Alimaa Khulan	26 – 7 February 1992	1.60 m (5 ft 3 in)
F	7	Bayarmaa Tsatsral	21 – 14 April 1997	1.74 m (5 ft 9 in)
G	8	Battogtokh Unurzaya	23 – 12 February 1995	1.65 m (5 ft 5 in)
F	9	Erdene Ariuntungalag	25 – 2 February 1993	1.76 m (5 ft 9 in)
G	10	Ganbat Bayartsetseg	30 – 17 January 1988	1.65 m (5 ft 5 in)
F	11	Dashnyam Bayanjargal	33 – 7 January 1985	1.75 m (5 ft 9 in)
F	12	Otgonbayar Bolortuya	27 – 2 August 1991	1.65 m (5 ft 5 in)
G	13	Bayankhuu Erdene-Otgon	19 – 3 October 1998	1.70 m (5 ft 7 in)
F	14	Bayasgalan Solongo	28 – 6 February 1990	1.80 m (5 ft 11 in)
C	15	Ulaankhuu Enerel	25 – 14 December 1992	1.83 m (6 ft 0 in)

Head coach

- (Mongolia) Odonbaatar Bayartsogt

Assistant coach(es)

- (Mongolia) Dashzeveg Enebish
- (Mongolia) Zorigt Tsolmon

Legend

- (C) Team captain
- (NP) Naturalized player
- Club - describes last
  club before the tournament
- Age - describes age
  on 15 August 2018

Group Y

Pos	Team	Pld	W	L	PF	PA	PD	Pts	Qualification
1	China	4	4	0	448	182	+266	8	Quarterfinals
2	Japan	4	3	1	392	225	+167	7	Quarterfinals
3	Thailand	4	2	2	231	316	−85	6	Quarterfinals
4	Mongolia	4	1	3	193	358	−165	5	Quarterfinals
5	Hong Kong	4	0	4	230	413	−183	4	

Source: OCA

17 August
18:30

Mongolia	83–79	Hong Kong
Scoring by quarter: 22–12, 25–26, 17–22, 19–19
Pts: Bulbul 37; Rebs: Solongo 13; Asts: Önörzayaa 7		Pts: Li 22; Rebs: Wong P., Wong K.M. 7 Asts: Li 6

Gelora Bung Karno Basketball Hall, Jakarta
Referees: Harja Jaladri (INA), Lee Ji-youn (KOR), Anan Daraghma (PLE)

19 August
12:30

Japan	107–35	Mongolia
Scoring by quarter: 30–11, 34–8, 25–11, 18–5
Pts: Shinozaki 19; Rebs: Suzuki 15; Asts: Yasuma 9		Pts: Bulbul 16; Rebs: Bayartsetseg 7 Asts: Bulbul 3

Gelora Bung Karno Basketball Hall, Jakarta
Referees: Kim Jong-kuk (KOR), Imran Ali Baig (IND), Johan Christiana (INA)

20 August
12:30

China	110–36	Mongolia
Scoring by quarter: 26–15, 31–9, 26–9, 27–3
Pts: Li Yue. 21; Rebs: Li Yue. 11; Asts: Wang S. 8		Pts: Bulbul 15; Rebs: Enerel 9 Asts: Bulbul 4

Gelora Bung Karno Basketball Hall, Jakarta
Referees: Alexey Stepanenko (KAZ), Snehal Bendke (IND), Lee Ji-youn (KOR)

23 August
12:30

Mongolia	39–62	Thailand
Scoring by quarter: 6–10, 12–13, 12–21, 9–18
Pts: Bulbul 11; Rebs: Altanzayaa 13; Asts: Bayanjargal 4		Pts: Klanbut, Maihom 11; Rebs: Kunchuan 10; Asts: Kunchuan, Saechua 4

Gelora Bung Karno Basketball Hall, Jakarta
Referees: Yevgeniy Mikheyev (KAZ), Lee Ji-youn (KOR), Haryanto Sutaryo (INA)

Quarter-final

26 August
10:00

Chinese Taipei	76–59	Mongolia
Scoring by quarter: 11–14, 22–20, 20–9, 23–16
Pts: Huang Y. 28; Rebs: Wang 10; Asts: Huang F. 9		Pts: Solongo 14; Rebs: Bulbul, Solongo 7 Asts: Solongo 6

Gelora Bung Karno Basketball Hall, Jakarta
Referees: Snehal Bendke (IND), Kumiko Kumagai (JPN), Haryanto Sutaryo (INA)

Classification 5th–8th

28 August
10:00

Mongolia	51–80	Thailand
Scoring by quarter: 11–17, 12–21, 18–13, 10–29
Pts: Bulbul 11; Rebs: Bulbul 10; Asts: Khulan 4		Pts: Yothanan, Klanbut, Prajuapsook 14; Rebs: Klanbut 9 Asts: Supyen, Klanbut 5

Gelora Bung Karno Basketball Hall, Jakarta
Referees: Lee Ji-youn (KOR), Chen Ying-cheng (TPE), Anan Daraghma (PLE)

Seventh place game

31 August
10:00

Mongolia	66–82	Indonesia
Scoring by quarter: 6–14, 16–31, 22–17, 22–20
Pts: Bayartsetseg 23; Rebs: Bulbul, Khulan, Enerel 5 Asts: Khulan 8		Pts: Christaline 37; Rebs: Gabriel 13; Asts: Gabriel, Sutjiono 7

Istora Gelora Bung Karno, Jakarta
Referees: Lee Ji-youn (KOR), Watcharin Padungratchadakit (THA), Cui Zhexiong (CHN)

=== 3x3 basketball ===
Mongolia national 3x3 team participated in the Games. The men's and women's team placed in pool B respectively based on the FIBA 3x3 federation ranking.

==== Men's tournament ====
Roster

The following is the Mongolia roster in the men's 3x3 basketball tournament of the 2018 Asian Games.

- Purevsuren Munkh-Orgil (5)
- Chuluunbaatar Ikhbayar (10)
- Ariunbaatar Sukhbat (11)
- Onolbaatar Enkhbaatar (13)

Pool B

Pos	Team	Pld	W	L	PF	PA	PD	Qualification
1	South Korea	4	4	0	83	46	+37	Quarterfinals
2	Chinese Taipei	4	3	1	79	50	+29	Quarterfinals
3	Mongolia	4	2	2	63	68	−5	
4	Kyrgyzstan	4	1	3	44	71	−27	
5	Bangladesh	4	0	4	35	69	−34	

Source: OCA

22 August
15:20

Mongolia	15–19	Chinese Taipei
Pts: Mönkh-Orgil 9		Pts: Chou 6

Gelora Bung Karno Tennis Center Court, Jakarta
Referees: Liu (MAS), Rulyov (KAZ)

22 August
16:30

Bangladesh	13–17	Mongolia
Pts: Rahman 5		Pts: Mönkh-Orgil, Enkhbaatar 6

Gelora Bung Karno Tennis Center Court, Jakarta
Referees: Quinn (INA), Ibragimow (TKM)

25 August
19:00

Mongolia	22–15	Kyrgyzstan
Pts: Enkhbaatar 9		Pts: Mushtruev 6

Gelora Bung Karno Tennis Center Court, Jakarta
Referees: Lim (MAS), Ibragimow (TKM)

25 August
20:30

South Korea	21–9	Mongolia
Pts: An 9		Pts: Mönkh-Orgil 6

Gelora Bung Karno Tennis Center Court, Jakarta
Referees: Liu (MAS), Rulyov (KAZ)

==== Women's tournament ====
Roster

The following is the Mongolia roster in the women's 3x3 basketball tournament of the 2018 Asian Games.

- Munkhsaikhan Tserenlkham (2)
- Ganbat Minjin (6)
- Batsuren Nandintsetseg (7)
- Onolbaatar Khulan (13)

Pool B

Pos	Team	Pld	W	L	PF	PA	PD	Qualification
1	Japan	3	3	0	57	15	+42	Quarterfinals
2	Chinese Taipei	3	2	1	50	32	+18	Quarterfinals
3	Mongolia	3	1	2	23	54	−31	
4	Nepal	3	0	3	23	52	−29	

Source: OCA

22 August
15:40

Mongolia	1–22	Japan
Pts: Khulan 1		Pts: Okuyama 10

Gelora Bung Karno Tennis Center Court, Jakarta
Referees: Lim (MAS), Quinn (INA)

25 August
19:40

Mongolia	12–11	Nepal
Pts: Tserenlkham, Minjin 5		Pts: Khadka 4

Gelora Bung Karno Tennis Center Court, Jakarta
Referees: Lim (MAS), Al-Harthi (OMA)

25 August
21:10

Chinese Taipei	21–10	Mongolia
Pts: Lo 9		Pts: Minjin 4

Gelora Bung Karno Tennis Center Court, Jakarta
Referees: Liu (MAS), Lim (MAS)

== Bowling ==
Men

Athlete	Event	Block 1	Block 2	Total	Rank
Athlete	Event	Result	Result	Total	Rank
Tsedendambyn Lkhaasüren; Khürelbaataryn Khishigbat; Jamtsyn Sodnomdorj	Trios	1633	1802	3435	30
Dorjiin Chuluunbaatar; Enkhtöriin Amgalanbat; Jarantain Tsevegmid	Trios	1536	1590	3126	31
Tsedendambyn Lkhaasüren; Khürelbaataryn Khishigbat; Jamtsyn Sodnomdorj; Dorjiin Chuluunbaatar; Enkhtöriin Amgalanbat; Jarantain Tsevegmid	Team of six	3362	3343	6705	15

Women

Athlete	Event	Block 1	Block 2	Total	Rank
Athlete	Event	Result	Result	Total	Rank
Uliziikhorol Khalzan; Tsetsegsuren Luvsandavga; Delgertseseg Samdan	Trios	1425	1623	3048	22
Dolgormaa Tumurjav; Urantsetseg Tsoodon; Gerlee Shatarbil	Trios	1484	1422	2906	23
Uliziikhorol Khalzan; Tsetsegsuren Luvsandavga; Delgertseseg Samdan; Dolgormaa Tumurjav; Urantsetseg Tsoodon; Gerlee Shatarbil	Team of six	2895	2907	5802	10

== Boxing ==
Men

Athlete	Event	Round of 32	Round of 16	Quarterfinals	Semifinals	Final	Rank
Athlete	Event	Opposition Result	Opposition Result	Opposition Result	Opposition Result	Opposition Result	Rank
Enkhmandakh Kharkhuu	–49 kg	Shin J-h (KOR); W 3–0	A Panghal (IND); L 0–5	Did not advance			
Gankhuyagiin Gan-Erdene	–52 kg	Bye	R Tanaka (JPN); W 4–1	Y Tongdee (THA); L 2–3	Did not advance		
Kharkhüügiin Enkh-Amar	–56 kg	H Tsutsumi (JPN); W 3–2	M Hussamuddin (IND); W 3–2	M Mirzakhalilov (UZB); L 2–3	Did not advance		
Erdenebatyn Tsendbaatar	–60 kg	Bye	AJ Karbalai (IRQ); W 5–0	H Imankuliyev (TKM); W 5–0	Shan J (CHN); W 5–0	S Abdurasulov (UZB); W 3–2	1st place, gold medalist(s)
Baatarsükh Chinzorig	–64 kg	Bye	Ri K-t (PRK); W 5–0	D Rangi (IND); W 5–0	W Masuk (THA); W 3–2	I Kholdarov (UZB); L 0–5	2nd place, silver medalist(s)
Otgonbaatar Byamba-Erdene	–69 kg	BU Baturov (UZB); L 0–5	Did not advance				
Davaasuren Davaanyam	–75 kg	Bye	I Madrimov (UZB); L 0–5	Did not advance			

Women

Athlete	Event	Round of 32	Round of 16	Quarterfinals	Semifinals	Final	Rank
Athlete	Event	Opposition Result	Opposition Result	Opposition Result	Opposition Result	Opposition Result	Rank
Ochirbat Jargalan	–51 kg	Bye	B Shrestha (NEP); W 4–1	Nguyễn TT (VIE); L 0–5	Did not advance		
Bolortuul Tumurkhuyag	–57 kg	—N/a	Jo S-h (PRK); L 0–5	Did not advance			
Namuun Monkhor	–60 kg	—N/a	Choe H-s (PRK); L 0–5	Did not advance			

== Cycling ==
=== Mountain biking ===
Athlete	Event	Final	
Athlete	Event	Time	Rank
Sugarmaagiin Ayuush-Ochir	Men's cross-country	−4 laps	20
Boldyn Iderbold	Men's cross-country	−5 laps	22
Gantogtokhyn Enkhjin	Women's cross-country	DNF	—

=== Road ===
Athlete	Event	Final	
Athlete	Event	Time	Rank
Enkhtaivany Bolor-Erdene	Men's road race	3:41:15	50
Sainbayaryn Jambaljamts	Men's road race	3:28:23	21
Batmönkhiin Maral-Erdene	Men's road race	DNS	—
Tuulkhangain Tögöldör	Men's road race	3:29:56	29
Batmönkhiin Maral-Erdene	Men's time trial	1:04:02.05	12

=== Track ===
Pursuit

Athlete	Event	Qualification		Final	
Athlete	Event	Time	Rank	Opposition Time	Rank
Tuulkhangain Tögöldör	Men's pursuit	4:40.463	9	Did not advance	

Omnium

Athlete	Event	Scratch race		Tempo race		Elimination race		Points race		Total points	Rank
Athlete	Event	Rank	Points	Rank	Points	Rank	Points	Rank	Points	Total points	Rank
Sainbayaryn Jambaljamts	Men's omnium	3	36	7	5	16	10	9	5	79	9

== Fencing ==
Individual

Athlete	Event	Preliminary		Round of 32	Round of 16	Quarterfinals	Semifinals	Final	
Athlete	Event	Opposition Score	Rank	Opposition Score	Opposition Score	Opposition Score	Opposition Score	Opposition Score	Rank
Bayarsaikhany Batkhüü	Men's épée	Koh IJ (MAS): W 5–2; A Saeeduddin (PAK): W 5–4; O Sokolov (UZB): L 4–5; D Alexanin (KAZ): L 4–5; Nguyễn PĐ (VIE): L 2–5; D Siahaan (INA): L 1–5	6 Q	Koh IJ (MAS); L 9–15	Did not advance				24
Enkhtsogtyn Dulguun	Men's épée	K Juengamnuaychai (THA): L 4–5; MR Tadi (IRI): L 4–5; A Al-Hammadi (UAE): W 5–4; Park S-y (KOR): L 4–5; Shi GF (CHN): L 3–4; FP Vag-Urminsky (CAM): L 2–5	6	Did not advance					29
Gerelmaa Baatarchuluun	Women's épée	J Dutta (IND): L 3–5; DN Tannous (LBN): L 2–5; U Balaganskaya (KAZ): L 2–5; Choi I-j (KOR): W 5–3; H Abella (PHI): W 5–1	5 Q	VA Lim (SGP); L 9–15	Did not advance				20
Khaliunaa Ganbold	Women's épée	T Al-Abdulla (QAT): W 5–1; K Thanee (THA): L 2–5; Nguyễn TNH (VIE): L 4–5; S Komata (JPN): L 3–5; V Kong (HKG): L 2–5	5 Q	W Takhamwong (THA); L 7–15	Did not advance				23
Yundendorjiin Ariunzayaa	Women's sabre	Au SY (HKG): L 1–5; K Shreshta (NEP): L 0–5; Qian JR (CHN): L 1–5; Bùi TTH (VIE): L 1–5; N Tamura (JPN): L 1–5	6	Did not advance					21

Team

Athlete	Event	Round of 16	Quarterfinals	Semifinals	Final	
Athlete	Event	Opposition Score	Opposition Score	Opposition Score	Opposition Score	Rank
Altangerel Bat Erdene; Bayarsaikhany Batkhüü; Enkhtsogtyn Dulguun; Erdenebat Bat-Erdene	Men's épée	China (CHN); L 24–45	Did not advance			13
Gerelmaa Baatarchuluun; Amarzaya Batsaikhan; Khaliunaa Ganbold; Nyamjargal Monkhor	Women's épée	Kazakhstan (KAZ); L 25–45	Did not advance			10

== Golf ==
Men

Athlete	Event	Round 1	Round 2	Round 3	Round 4	Total		
Athlete	Event	Score	Score	Score	Score	Score	Par	Rank
Boldbaatar Munkhbaatar	Individual	91	88	83	82	344	+56	80
Gangaa Mendsaikhan	Individual	93	100	86	89	368	+80	84
Choijamts Gantumur	Individual	95	101	99	94	389	+101	86
Jambaldorj Margad	Individual	98	91	87	98	374	+86	85
Boldbaatar Munkhbaatar; Gangaa Mendsaikhan; Choijamts Gantumur; Jambaldorj Margad	Team	279	279	256	265	1079	+215	20

Women

Athlete	Event	Round 1	Round 2	Round 3	Round 4	Total		
Athlete	Event	Score	Score	Score	Score	Score	Par	Rank
Byambajav Batnaran	Individual	95	95	94	92	376	+88	42
Nadmid Namuunaa	Individual	91	91	90	87	359	+71	40
Altansukh Enerel	Individual	95	94	88	90	367	+79	41
Byambajav Batnaran; Nadmid Namuunaa; Altansukh Enerel	Team	186	185	178	177	726	+150	15

== Gymnastics ==
Mongolia entered two athletes to participate in the gymnastics competition at the Games. One male athlete competed in the artistic event and one female athlete in the rhythmic event.

== Ju-jitsu ==
Key:

- ADV – Won by advantages.
- RDC – Won by referee decision.
- SUB – Won by submission.

Men

Athlete	Event	Round of 64	Round of 32	Round of 16	Quarterfinals	Semifinals	Repechage	Final / BM	Rank
Athlete	Event	Opposition Result	Opposition Result	Opposition Result	Opposition Result	Opposition Result	Opposition Result	Opposition Result	Rank
Gantömöriin Bayanduuren	–56 kg	—N/a	D Ruziev (UZB); L 0–4	Did not advance					
Ölziitogtokhyn Erdenebaatar	–56 kg	—N/a	Bye	G Dee (PHI); W 0^{ADV}–0	K Konyssov (KAZ); W 4–0	H Nawad (UAE); L 3–5	Bye	K Meredow (TKM); L 0–0^{RDC}	–
Narangereliin Khas-Erdene	–62 kg	—N/a	HB Safari (AFG); L 0–4	Did not advance					
Baataryn Mönkhbaatar	–62 kg	—N/a	M Agaýew (TKM); L 0–100^{SUB}	Did not advance					
Mönkhtöriin Batbileg	–69 kg	—N/a	N Kazhekov (KAZ); L 0–100^{SUB}	Did not advance					
Mönkhtöriin Davaadorj	–69 kg	—N/a	M Khabibulla (KAZ); L 0–2	Did not advance					
Batkhuyagiin Erkhbayar	–77 kg	Bye	U Otamurodov (UZB); W 4–2	N Al-Qosaib (BRN); W 100^{SUB}–0	S Al-Hammadi (UAE); W 2–0	R Israilov (KAZ); L 0–6	Bye	M Al-Qubaisi (UAE); L 0–0^{ADV}	–
Tömörtogoogiin Mönkh	–77 kg	Bye	R Ngamyoo (THA); W 5–0	A Garaýew (TKM); W 0^{ADV}–0	A Al-Rasheed (JOR); L 0–2	Did not advance	M Al-Qubaisi (UAE); L 0–4	Did not advance	
Khürelbaataryn Möngönbayar	–85 kg	—N/a	M Murtazaliev (KGZ); L 0–15	Did not advance					
Tömöriin Nemekhbayar	–85 kg	—N/a	H Ranjbar (IRI); L 0–0^{ADV}	Did not advance					
Baasandorjiin Ariuntsog	–94 kg	—N/a	Bye	Hwang M-s (KOR); L 0–100^{SUB}	Did not advance				
Khürelbaataryn Möngönbayar	–94 kg	—N/a	M Jalilvand (IRI); DSQ	Did not advance					

Women

Athlete	Event	Round of 32	Round of 16	Quarterfinals	Semifinals	Repechage	Final / BM	Rank
Athlete	Event	Opposition Result	Opposition Result	Opposition Result	Opposition Result	Opposition Result	Opposition Result	Rank
Mönkhgereliin Bayarmaa	–49 kg	Bye	M Mekenbayeva (KAZ); W 2–0	M Al-Hinaai (UAE); L 0–0^{ADV}	Did not advance	M Ochoa (PHI); L 0–100^{SUB}	Did not advance	
Battamiriin Khorloo	–49 kg	Bye	W Al-Yafei (UAE); DSQ	Did not advance				
Battsogtyn Buyandelger	–62 kg	C Lien (SGP); L 0–100^{SUB}	Did not advance					
Tsogkhüügiin Udval	–62 kg	Nguyễn TH (VIE); W 0^{ADV}–0	H Al-Shamsi (UAE); W 3–0	Sung K-r (KOR); L 0–5	Did not advance	Bye	S Julia (INA); W 2^{ADV}–2	3rd place, bronze medalist(s)

== Judo ==
13 judokas (7 men's and 6 women's) competed in the individual events.

Key:

- 1st number — Ippon
- 2nd number — Waza-ari
- s — Shido

Men

Athlete	Event	Round of 32	Round of 16	Quarterfinals	Semifinals	Repechage	Final / BM	Rank
Athlete	Event	Opposition Result	Opposition Result	Opposition Result	Opposition Result	Opposition Result	Opposition Result	Rank
Dashdavaagiin Amartüvshin	–60 kg	Bye	Lio CH (MAC); W 10–00s3	Lee H-r (KOR); L 00s1–10s1	Did not advance	Yang Y-w (TPE); L 00s3–10s2	Did not advance	
Battogtokhyn Erkhembayar	–66 kg	Bye	S Puntanam (THA); W 01s1–00	Y Zhumakanov (KAZ); L 00–10	Did not advance	A Te (KGZ); L 00–10	Did not advance	
Tsend-Ochiryn Tsogtbaatar	–73 kg	Bye	B Rysmambetov (KGZ); L 00s1–10s2	Did not advance				
Otgonbaataryn Uuganbaatar	–81 kg	Bye	A Murodov (TJK); W 10s1–00s1	D Khamza (KAZ); L 00s1–10	Did not advance	S Boltaboev (UZB); W 11s2–00	Lee S-s (KOR); W 01s2–00	3rd place, bronze medalist(s)
Gantulgyn Altanbagana	–90 kg	Bye	MI Kakar (AFG); W 10–00s1	S Sabirov (UZB); W 01–00	K Ustopiriyon (TJK); W 11s1–01s1	—N/a	Gwak D-h (KOR); L 00–10s1	2nd place, silver medalist(s)
Lkhagvasürengiin Otgonbaatar	–100 kg	Bye	W Puyang (THA); W 10s1–00	S Juraev (UZB); W 10s1–00s2	K Iida (JPN); L 00s3–10	Bye	S Saidov (TJK); W 10s1–00s2	3rd place, bronze medalist(s)
Ölziibayaryn Duurenbayar	+100 kg	—N/a	Bye	S Mirmamadov (TJK); W 01s1–00	J Mahjoub (IRI); W 10s2–00s2	—N/a	Kim S-m (KOR); L 00s1–01s2	2nd place, silver medalist(s)

Women

Athlete	Event	Round of 32	Round of 16	Quarterfinals	Semifinals	Repechage	Final / BM	Rank
Athlete	Event	Opposition Result	Opposition Result	Opposition Result	Opposition Result	Opposition Result	Opposition Result	Rank
Mönkhbatyn Urantsetseg	–48 kg	—N/a	Bye	Gao J-y (TPE); W 10–00	Jeong B-k (KOR); L 00s1–01s2	Bye	Jon Y-s (PRK); W 10–01	3rd place, bronze medalist(s)
Ganboldyn Gantsetseg	–52 kg	Bye	Tsui SK (HKG); W 10s1–00s1	G Babamuratowa (TKM); W 11–00	Park D-s (KOR); L 00–10	Bye	K Warasiha (THA); L 00s1–01s2	–
Dorjsürengiin Sumiyaa	–57 kg	Bye	Nguyễn TBN (VIE); W 10–00s1	Kim J-a (PRK); L 00s2–10s2	Did not advance	Leung PS (HKG); W 10s1–00s2	Lu TJ (CHN); W 01s1–00s2	3rd place, bronze medalist(s)
Boldyn Gankhaich	–63 kg	—N/a	Nguyễn NDP (VIE); W 10–00s1	Chen Y-t (TPE); W 01s2–00s2	K Watanabe (PHI); L 00–01s1	Bye	Han H-j (KOR); L 00s2–01s2	–
Tsend-Ayuushiin Naranjargal	–70 kg	—N/a	A Kadyrbekova (KGZ); W 10–00	G Matniyazova (UZB); L 00–11	Did not advance	M Takahashi (PHI); W 10–00s1	Z Bektaskyzy (KAZ); W 10s2–00s3	3rd place, bronze medalist(s)
Battulgyn Mönkhtuyaa	+78 kg	—N/a	Bye	Wang Y (CHN); L 00s2–01s1	Did not advance	R Ilmatova (UZB); W 10s1–00s2	G Issanova (KAZ); L 00s3–10s2	–

Mixed

Athlete	Event	Round of 16	Quarterfinals	Semifinals	Repechage	Final / BM	Rank
Athlete	Event	Opposition Result	Opposition Result	Opposition Result	Opposition Result	Opposition Result	Rank
Erdenekhuu Munkhjargal; Gantulgyn Altanbagana; Naidangiin Tüvshinbayar; Narankhuu Khadbaatar; Tsend-Ochiryn Tsogtbaatar; Ölziibayaryn Düürenbayar; Baldorjyn Möngönchimeg; Battulgyn Mönkhtuyaa; Dorjsürengiin Sumiyaa; Erdenebileg Gandiimaa; Enkhriilen Lkhagvatogoo; Tsend-Ayuushiin Naranjargal	Team	Bye	China (CHN); L 2–4	Did not advance			

== Karate ==
Mongolia participated in the karate competition at the Games with three men's athletes.

== Kurash ==
Men

Athlete	Event	Round of 32	Round of 16	Quarterfinal	Semifinal	Final	
Athlete	Event	Opposition Score	Opposition Score	Opposition Score	Opposition Score	Opposition Score	Rank
Jargalsaikhany Baasandash	–66 kg	R Buriev (UZB); L 000−111	Did not advance				
Adyaagiin Batsuuri	–66 kg	J Gahlot (IND); W 100−000	M Orazow (TKM); L 000−001	Did not advance			
Mönkhbatyn Dagvadorj	–81 kg	B Mohammadi (AFG); L 000−100	Did not advance				
Bayanmönkhiin Gaajadamba	–81 kg	Kunal (IND); W 111−000	SE Uulu (KGZ); W 001−001	E Aliakbari (IRI); L 001−001	Did not advance		
Batkhuyagiin Gonchigsüren	–90 kg	S Abdyrahmanow (TKM); L 001−103	Did not advance				
Ganbaataryn Lündeejantsan	–90 kg	Lo Y-h (TPE); L 000−100	Did not advance				
Bayarsaikhany Temüülen	+90 kg	Bye	N Turaev (UZB); L 000−100	Did not advance			
Khutagiin Tsogtgerel	+90 kg	N Elias (LBN); W 100−001	D Taganow (TKM); L 002−010	Did not advance			

Women

Athlete	Event	Round of 32	Round of 16	Quarterfinal	Semifinal	Final	
Athlete	Event	Opposition Score	Opposition Score	Opposition Score	Opposition Score	Opposition Score	Rank
Erdenetsogtyn Gerelmaa	–52 kg	Bye	Yen L-a (TPE); W 100−001	G Sulaymanova (UZB); L 000−102	Did not advance		
Erdenedalain Nürzedmaa	–52 kg	A Makeýewa (TKM); L 000−110	Did not advance				
Bayarbatyn Baasanjargal	–63 kg	M Kurbanowa (TKM); W 012−001	J Mosqueda (PHI); W 001−000	N Kubasheva (KAZ); W 001−001	M Abdumalikova (UZB); W 102−001	D Shermetova (UZB); L 000−002	2nd place, silver medalist(s)
Nyamsürengiin Undrakhzayaa	–63 kg	G Nasyrowa (TKM); L 001−011	Did not advance				
Ganbaataryn Minjinsor	–78 kg	Bye	Yang H-t (TPE); L 000−100	Did not advance			
Otgony Mönkhtsetseg	–78 kg	Bye	M Papara (INA); W 111−000	Z Bagheri (IRI); W 002−001	Nguyễn TL (VIE); W 110−000	K Yuldashova (UZB); L 010−101	2nd place, silver medalist(s)

== Modern pentathlon ==
Athlete	Event	Swimming (200 m freestyle)		Fencing (épée one touch)		Riding (show jumping)		Laser-run (shooting 10 m air pistol/ running 3200 m)		Total points	Final rank
Athlete	Event	Rank	MP points	Rank	MP points	Rank	MP points	Rank	MP points	Total points	Final rank
Altangereliin Bat-Erdene	Men's	15	0 (DNF)	15	0 (DNS)	13	0 (DNS)	15	0 (DNS)	0	15

== Paragliding ==
Men

Athlete	Event	Round										Total	Rank
Athlete	Event	1	2	3	4	5	6	7	8	9	10	Total	Rank
Khadkhüügiin Ariunbat	Individual accuracy	50	20	1	422	59	8	198	~~500~~	12	150	920	18
Alzakhgüin Batdavaa	Individual accuracy	~~500~~	62	168	234	112	404	228	21	117	500	1846	26
Khadkhüügiin Ariunbat; Alzakhgüin Batdavaa; Damdinsürengiin Battsengel; Pürevdelgeriin Bold	Team accuracy	1596	1094	1404	2156	896	1818	—N/a				8964	11
Pürevdelgeriin Bold	Cross-country	116	134	119	81	179	—N/a					629	10

Women

Athlete	Event	Round										Total	Rank
Athlete	Event	1	2	3	4	5	6	7	8	9	10	Total	Rank
Tümenbayaryn Chuluunbat	Individual accuracy	274	159	~~500~~	500	500	500	500	291	500	89	3313	16
Tümenbayaryn Chuluunbat	Cross-country	101	157	154	108	124	—N/a					644	8

== Roller sports ==
=== Speed skating ===
Athlete	Event	Final	
Athlete	Event	Time	Rank
Baadain Tulga	Men's road 20 km race	DNF	–
Yalaltyn Zorigtbaatar	Men's road 20 km race	DNF	–

== Sambo ==
Key:

- SU – Won by submission.

Athlete	Event	Round of 32	Round of 16	Quarterfinal	Semifinal	Repechage 1	Repechage 2	Repechage final	Final / BM	
Athlete	Event	Opposition Result	Opposition Result	Opposition Result	Opposition Result	Opposition Result	Opposition Result	Opposition Result	Opposition Result	Rank
Shaaluugiin Erdenebaatar	Men's 52 kg	Bye	A Asakeev (KGZ); W 7–5	M Ghusn (SYR); W 3–0	B Kanzhanov (KAZ); W 8–0	Bye			B Ibragim (KAZ); L 4–2^{SU}	2nd place, silver medalist(s)
Genendaramyn Mönkhbat	Men's 52 kg	Bye	M Ghusn (SYR); L 2–3	Did not advance		Bye	K Yamamoto (JPN); L ^{Dsq}	Did not advance		
Khashbaataryn Tsagaanbaatar	Men's 90 kg	A Zekenov (KAZ); L 2–13	Did not advance							
Ganbaataryn Narantsetseg	Women's 48 kg	—N/a	A Nurajijah (INA); W 5^{SU}–0	A Zhylkybayeva (KAZ); W 5^{SU}–0	M Turgunbaeva (UZB); W 5^{SU}–0	Bye	—N/a	Bye	B Oidovchimed (MGL); W 6–0	1st place, gold medalist(s)
Baasansürengiin Oidovchimed	Women's 48 kg	—N/a	N Yelmuratova (KAZ); W 5–0	N Gulova (UZB); W 2–2	MM Ince (INA); W 10–0	Bye	—N/a	Bye	G Narantsetseg (MGL); L 0–6	2nd place, silver medalist(s)
Tsog-Ochiryn Battsetseg	Women's 68 kg	Bye	D Kudarova (KAZ); L 3–3	Did not advance		Bye	A Kadyrbekova (KGZ); W 10–0	T Junsookplung (THA); W 8–0	M Davaasüren (MGL); W 3–0	3rd place, bronze medalist(s)
Mönkhbatyn Davaasüren	Women's 68 kg	Bye	Sakinah (INA); W 3–0	G Ismatova (UZB); W 1–1	D Kuryshbayeva (KAZ); L 1–3	Bye			T Battsetseg (MGL); L 0–3	4

== Shooting ==
Men

Athlete	Event	Qualification		Final	
Athlete	Event	Points	Rank	Points	Rank
Shirgalyn Buyanzayaa	10 m air pistol	574	15	Did not advance	
Enkhtaivany Davaakhüü	10 m air pistol	573	19	Did not advance	
Shirgalyn Buyanzayaa	25 m rapid fire pistol	527	21	Did not advance	
Enkhtaivany Davaakhüü	25 m rapid fire pistol	573	10	Did not advance	
Nyantain Bayaraa	10 m air rifle	604.0	39	Did not advance	
Nyantain Bayaraa	50 m rifle three positions	1145	18	Did not advance	

Women

Athlete	Event	Qualification		Final	
Athlete	Event	Points	Rank	Points	Rank
Tömörchödöriin Bayartsetseg	10 m air pistol	554	31	Did not advance	
Otryadyn Gündegmaa	10 m air pistol	545	35	Did not advance	
Otryadyn Gündegmaa	25 m pistol	578	11	Did not advance	
Tsogbadrakhyn Mönkhzul	25 m pistol	570	23	Did not advance	
Chuluunbadrakhyn Narantuya	10 m air rifle	619.3	19	Did not advance	
Gankhuyag Nandinzaya	10 m air rifle	626.6	4 Q	227.4	3rd place, bronze medalist(s)
Chuluunbadrakhyn Narantuya	50 m rifle three positions	1173	2 Q	451.4	2nd place, silver medalist(s)
Gankhuyag Nandinzaya	50 m rifle three positions	1175 QGR	1 Q	458.8 GR	1st place, gold medalist(s)
Namduun Zorigoo	Trap	12	25	Did not advance	

Mixed team

Athlete	Event	Qualification		Final	
Athlete	Event	Points	Rank	Points	Rank
Enkhtaivany Davaakhüü; Tömörchödöriin Bayartsetseg	10 m air pistol	755	11	Did not advance	
Nyantain Bayaraa; Gankhuyag Nandinzaya	10 m air rifle	832.1	3 Q	346.6	5

== Soft tennis ==
Athlete	Event	Group Stage				Quarterfinals	Semifinals	Final	
Athlete	Event	Opposition Score	Opposition Score	Opposition Score	Rank	Opposition Score	Opposition Score	Opposition Score	Rank
Enkhjin Bolortuya	Men's singles	ESH Khan (PAK); W 4–0	P Simpatiaji (INA); L 1–4	—N/a	2	Did not advance			
Telmen Enkhbaatar	Men's singles	N Damian Jr. (PHI); L 3–4	Kim D-h (KOR); L 0–4	—N/a	3	Did not advance			
Chinmurun Bataa	Women's singles	V Khan (PAK); W 4–0	PL Catindig (PHI); L 0–4	D Srirungreang (THA); L 0–4	3	Did not advance			
Norovsuren Bulgan	Women's singles	Yu YY (CHN); L 0–4	A Mehra (IND); W 4–2	M Aliya (LAO); W 4–0	2	Did not advance			
Damdin Altankhuyag; Anudari Munguntsetseg	Mixed doubles	N Seth / AC Patel (IND); WO	T Uematsu / R Hayashida (JPN); L 0^{R}–5	—N/a	3	Did not advance			
Enkhjin Bolortuya; Norovsuren Bulgan	Mixed doubles	K Masuda / R Kuroki (JPN); L 2–5	MA Ehtisham / SEB Zaidi (PAK); W 5–1	—N/a	2	Did not advance			
Telmen Enkhbaatar; Bilguun Tsogbadrakh; Enkhjin Bolortuya; Enkhtuvshin Gantulga; Damdin Alankhuyag	Men's team	Chinese Taipei (TPE); L 0–3	Thailand (THA); W 2–1	Vietnam (VIE); W 3–0	2 Q	Indonesia (INA); L 0–2	Did not advance		
Norovsuren Bulgan; Chinmurun Bataa; Iveel Turbat	Women's team	India (IND); L 0–3	Thailand (THA); L 0–3	South Korea (KOR); L 0–3	4	Did not advance			

== Sport climbing ==
Combined

Athlete	Event	Qualification					Final				
Athlete	Event	Speed Point	Boulder Point	Lead Point	Total	Rank	Speed Point	Boulder Point	Lead Point	Total	Rank
Nyamdoogiin Kherlen	Men's	23	22	23	11638	23	Did not advance				
Batbaataryn Ariunbayar	Women's	18	19.5	19	6669	19	Did not advance				
Namkhain Anujin	Women's	19	19.5	20	7410	20	Did not advance				

== Squash ==
Singles

Athlete	Event	Round of 32	Round of 16	Quarterfinals	Semifinals	Final	
Athlete	Event	Opposition Score	Opposition Score	Opposition Score	Opposition Score	Opposition Score	Rank
Bat-Amgalan Enkhbold	Men's	S A Amjad (QAT); L 0–3	Did not advance				
Bat-Oktyabri Davaasuren	Men's	A Al-Tamimi (QAT); L 0–3	Did not advance				
Khaliun Enkhbayar	Women's	Li DJ (CHN); L 0–3	Did not advance				
Uyanga Amarmend	Women's	Y A Dalida (PHI); L 0–3	Did not advance				

== Swimming ==
Men

Athlete	Event	Heats		Final	
Athlete	Event	Time	Rank	Time	Rank
Jurmed Batmunkh	50 m breaststroke	32.00	30	Did not advance	
Jurmed Batmunkh	100 m breaststroke	1:12.95	29	Did not advance	
Jurmed Batmunkh	200 m breaststroke	2:40.71	19	Did not advance	
Jurmed Batmunkh	100 m butterfly	1:01.33	30	Did not advance	
Jurmed Batmunkh	200 m butterfly	2:29.50	18	Did not advance	
Jurmed Batmunkh	200 m individual medley	2:21.28	19	Did not advance	
Batmunkh Boldbaatar	200 m freestyle	2:15.60	32	Did not advance	
Batmunkh Boldbaatar	400 m freestyle	5:01.74	21	Did not advance	
Buyantogtokh Boldbaatar	50 m freestyle	25.86	44	Did not advance	
Buyantogtokh Boldbaatar	100 m freestyle	55.25	37	Did not advance	
Buyantogtokh Boldbaatar	400 m freestyle	4:36.79	18	Did not advance	
Buyantogtokh Boldbaatar	50 m backstroke	29.72	31	Did not advance	
Buyantogtokh Boldbaatar	100 m backstroke	1:05.43	24	Did not advance	
Buyantogtokh Boldbaatar	200 m backstroke	2:21.49	18	Did not advance	
Bat-Od Buman-Uchral	50 m backstroke	33.56	38	Did not advance	
Bat-Od Buman-Uchral	50 m butterfly	29.96	39	Did not advance	
Bat-Od Buman-Uchral	200 m butterfly	2:38.27	19	Did not advance	
Demuul Erdenemunkh	100 m backstroke	1:03.80	23	Did not advance	
Demuul Erdenemunkh	200 m backstroke	2:24.64	20	Did not advance	
Demuul Erdenemunkh	50 m butterfly	27.55	36	Did not advance	
Demuul Erdenemunkh	200 m individual medley	2:26.46	20	Did not advance	
Tengis Gotsbayar	200 m freestyle	2:44.57	34	Did not advance	
Tengis Gotsbayar	200 m breaststroke	3:11.23	21	Did not advance	
Zandanbal Gunsennorov	50 m freestyle	25.12	40	Did not advance	
Zandanbal Gunsennorov	100 m freestyle	55.34	38	Did not advance	
Zandanbal Gunsennorov	50 m breaststroke	29.96	26	Did not advance	
Zandanbal Gunsennorov	100 m breaststroke	1:07.94	25	Did not advance	
Jurmed Batmunkh; Demuul Erdenemunkh; Buyantogtokh Boldbaatar; Zandanbal Gunsennorov	4×100 m freestyle relay	3:44.82	14	Did not advance	
Jurmed Batmunkh; Demuul Erdenemunkh; Buyantogtokh Boldbaatar; Zandanbal Gunsennorov	4×100 m medley relay	4:09.99	14	Did not advance	

Women

Athlete	Event	Heats		Final	
Athlete	Event	Time	Rank	Time	Rank
Kherlen Altanshagai	200 m freestyle	2:33.53	23	Did not advance	
Kherlen Altanshagai	50 m butterfly	32.85	21	Did not advance	
Kherlen Altanshagai	100 m butterfly	1:11.58	22	Did not advance	
Kherlen Altanshagai	200 m butterfly	2:52.60	14	Did not advance	
Kherlen Altanshagai	200 m individual medley	2:47.28	17	Did not advance	
Enkhkhuslen Batbayar	50 m freestyle	28.23	20	Did not advance	
Enkhkhuslen Batbayar	100 m freestyle	1:00.13	17	Did not advance	
Enkhkhuslen Batbayar	100 m butterfly	1:06.81	19	Did not advance	
Enkhkhuslen Batbayar	200 m butterfly	2:40.50	13	Did not advance	
Enkhkhuslen Batbayar	200 m individual medley	2:30.20	14	Did not advance	
Yesui Bayar	50 m backstroke	33.61	18	Did not advance	
Yesui Bayar	100 m backstroke	1:12.46	18	Did not advance	
Yesui Bayar	200 m backstroke	2:41.07	16	Did not advance	
Ariuntamir Enkh-Amgalan	50 m backstroke	33.98	19	Did not advance	
Ariuntamir Enkh-Amgalan	100 m backstroke	1:14.31	19	Did not advance	
Ariuntamir Enkh-Amgalan	200 m backstroke	2:47.80	17	Did not advance	
Tselmeg Erdene	400 m freestyle	5:03.24	14	Did not advance	
Tselmeg Erdene	800 m freestyle	—N/a		10:22.18	16
Enkhzul Khuyagbaatar	50 m freestyle	28.98	22	Did not advance	
Enkhzul Khuyagbaatar	100 m freestyle	1:02.19	20	Did not advance	
Amingoo Temuujin	50 m breaststroke	38.60	24	Did not advance	
Amingoo Temuujin	100 m breaststroke	1:23.69	23	Did not advance	
Kherlen Altanshagai; Enkhzul Khuyagbaatar; Yesui Bayar; Enkhkhuslen Batbayar	4×100 m freestyle relay	4:14.58	9	Did not advance	
Enkhkhuslen Batbayar; Enkhzul Khuyagbaatar; Kherlen Altanshagai; Tselmeg Erdene	4×200 m freestyle relay	9:37.23	9 Q	9:24.96	8
Yesui Bayar; Amingoo Temuujin; Enkhkhuslen Batbayar; Enkhzul Khuyagbaatar	4×100 m medley relay	4:52.13	9	Did not advance	

Mixed

Athlete	Event	Heats		Final	
Athlete	Event	Time	Rank	Time	Rank
Demuul Erdenemunkh; Zandanbal Gunsennorov; Enkhkhuslen Batbayar; Enkhzul Khuyagbaatar	4x100 m mixed medley relay	4:22.76	10	Did not advance	

== Table tennis ==
Individual

Athlete	Event	Round 1	Round 2	Round of 16	Quarterfinals	Semifinals	Final	
Athlete	Event	Opposition Score	Opposition Score	Opposition Score	Opposition Score	Opposition Score	Opposition Score	Rank
Erdenebayar Chinbat	Men's singles	A Lal Malla (NEP); W 4–3	Chuang C-y (TPE); L 0–4	Did not advance				
Lkhagvasuren Enkhbat	Men's singles	Choe Il (PRK); L 1–4	Did not advance					
Bolor-Erdene Batmunkh	Women's singles	M Faramarzi (QAT); W 4–2	Cheng I-c (TPE); L 0–4	Did not advance				
Doljinzuu Batbayar	Women's singles	S Nembang (NEP); W 4–0	Lee HC (HKG); L 0–4	Did not advance				
Munkhzorig Jargalsaikhan; Bolor-Erdene Batmunkh	Mixed doubles	Bye	Chuang C-y / Chen S-y (TPE); L 0–4	Did not advance				
Temuulen Myandal; Undram Munkhbat	Mixed doubles	S Shrestha / N Shrestha (NEP); L 0–3	Did not advance					

Team

Athlete	Event	Group Stage					Quarterfinal	Semifinal	Final	
Athlete	Event	Opposition Score	Opposition Score	Opposition Score	Opposition Score	Rank	Opposition Score	Opposition Score	Opposition Score	Rank
Lkhagvasuren Enkhbat; Erdenebayar Chinbat; Munkhzorig Jargalsaikhan; Bilegt Batkhishig; Temuulen Myandal	Men's	South Korea (KOR); L 0–3	Indonesia (INA); L 0–3	Hong Kong (HKG); L 0–3	Yemen (YEM); W 3–0	4	Did not advance			
Undram Munkhbat; Bolor-Erdene Batmunkh; Doljinzuu Batbayar; Khongorzul Batsaikhan	Women's	North Korea (PRK); L 0–3	Thailand (THA); L 0–3	Japan (JPN); L 0–3	—N/a	4	Did not advance			

== Taekwondo ==
Kyorugi

Athlete	Event	Round of 32	Round of 16	Quarterfinal	Semifinal	Final	
Athlete	Event	Opposition Score	Opposition Score	Opposition Score	Opposition Score	Opposition Score	Rank
Enkhboldyn Buyanshagai	Men's −58 kg	S Khan (PAK); W 27–11	R Sawekwiharee (THA); L 3–24	Did not advance			
Molomyn Tümenbayar	Men's −63 kg	Y Dorji (BHU); W 23–2	A N Iman Hakim (MAS); W 26–5	Zhao S (CHN); L 5–25	Did not advance		
Achitkhüügiin Natsagdorj	Men's −68 kg	Bye	M Iqbal (PAK); W 45–24	A Abu-Ghaush (JOR); L 12–15	Did not advance		
Pürevjavyn Temüüjin	Men's −80 kg	N P D Azlan (MAS); W 35–13	N Rafalovich (UZB); L 7–25 ^{P}	Did not advance			

== Tennis ==
Men

Athlete	Event	Round of 64	Round of 32	Round of 16	Quarterfinals	Semifinals	Final	
Athlete	Event	Opposition Score	Opposition Score	Opposition Score	Opposition Score	Opposition Score	Opposition Score	Rank
Düürenbayar Erdenebayar	Singles	Bye	W Trongcharoenchaikul (THA); L 4–6, 1–6	Did not advance				
Mönkhbaatar Badrakh	Singles	A Khan (PAK); L 1–6, 1–6	Did not advance					
Düürenbayar Erdenebayar; Mönkhbaatar Badrakh	Doubles	Bye	Gong MX / Zhang Z (CHN); L 0–6, 1–6	Did not advance				
Günburd Batjargal; Angarag Sandag	Doubles	Bye	A Bublik / D Yevseyev (KAZ); L 2–6, 1–6	Did not advance				

Women

Athlete	Event	Round of 64	Round of 32	Round of 16	Quarterfinals	Semifinals	Final	
Athlete	Event	Opposition Score	Opposition Score	Opposition Score	Opposition Score	Opposition Score	Opposition Score	Rank
Ariun-Erdene Erdenebileg	Singles	A Seneviratne (SRI); L 1–6, 2–6	Did not advance					
Jargal Altansarnai	Singles	Bye	K Thandi (IND); L 1–6, 0–6	Did not advance				
Jargal Altansarnai; Ariun-Erdene Erdenebileg	Doubles	—N/a	T Naklo / M Sawangkaew (THA); L 1–6, 2–6	Did not advance				

Mixed

Athlete	Event	Round of 64	Round of 32	Round of 16	Quarterfinals	Semifinals	Final	
Athlete	Event	Opposition Score	Opposition Score	Opposition Score	Opposition Score	Opposition Score	Opposition Score	Rank
Jargal Altansarnai; Günburd Batjargal	Doubles	Bye	E Hayashi / K Uesugi (JPN); L 1–6, 0–6	Did not advance				
Shinejargal Battör; Temuugei Enkhsaikhan	Doubles	Bye	Yang ZX / Gong MX (CHN); L 0–6, 0–6	Did not advance				

== Triathlon ==
Mixed relay

Athletes	Event	Total Times per Athlete (Swim 300 m, Bike 6.3 km, Run 2.1 km)	Total Group Time	Rank
Enkhjin Bat-Orshikh; Gansukh Chuluunsukh; Turbold Munkhbold; Uyanga Erdenebat	Mixed relay	30:25; 29:35; 28:19; 31:32	1:59:51	13

== Volleyball ==
=== Indoor volleyball ===
Team	Event	Group Stage		Playoffs	Quarterfinals / Pl.	Semifinals / Pl.	Final / BM / Pl.	
Team	Event	Oppositions Scores	Rank	Opposition Score	Opposition Score	Opposition Score	Opposition Score	Rank
Mongolia men's	Men's tournament	Pakistan: L 0–3; Iran: L 0–3	3	Did not advance	Nepal; L 1–3	Did not advance	Kazakhstan; L 0–3	18

==== Men's tournament ====
Team roster

The following is the Mongolia roster in the men's volleyball tournament of the 2018 Asian Games.

Head coach: Solongo Dorj

No.	Name	Date of birth	Height	Weight	Spike	Block	Club
1	Nyamsukh Sukhee	9 March 2000	1.81 m (5 ft 11 in)	70 kg (150 lb)	325 cm (128 in)	320 cm (130 in)	
2	Turmandakh Gankhuyag	19 August 1998	1.83 m (6 ft 0 in)	78 kg (172 lb)	305 cm (120 in)	300 cm (120 in)	(Mongolia) Hasu Megastars
3	Altangerel Enkhee	20 June 1995	1.92 m (6 ft 4 in)	87 kg (192 lb)	330 cm (130 in)	325 cm (128 in)	(Mongolia) Hasu Megastars
5	Buyanjargal Zolboot	17 May 1994	1.78 m (5 ft 10 in)	75 kg (165 lb)	290 cm (110 in)	285 cm (112 in)	(Mongolia) Hasu Megastars
7	Tserenbaatar Myagmarchimed	19 August 1998	1.78 m (5 ft 10 in)	75 kg (165 lb)	310 cm (120 in)	300 cm (120 in)	(Mongolia) Hasu Megastars
9	Munkhsaikahn Munkhbayar	10 December 1990	1.77 m (5 ft 10 in)	74 kg (163 lb)	290 cm (110 in)	285 cm (112 in)	(Mongolia) Hasu Megastars
10	Usukhbayar Turmandakh	20 October 2000	1.89 m (6 ft 2 in)	80 kg (180 lb)	325 cm (128 in)	320 cm (130 in)	
11	Batjargal Jargal	23 October 1995	1.87 m (6 ft 2 in)	80 kg (180 lb)	320 cm (130 in)	315 cm (124 in)	(Mongolia) Hasu Megastars
13	Bazargur Altantsag	9 June 1990	1.89 m (6 ft 2 in)	82 kg (181 lb)	325 cm (128 in)	320 cm (130 in)	(Mongolia) Hasu Megastars
15	Davaajargal Altankhuyag (c)	25 November 1991	1.84 m (6 ft 0 in)	82 kg (181 lb)	321 cm (126 in)	315 cm (124 in)	(Mongolia) Hasu Megastars
17	Munkh-Erdene Aduuch	21 February 1994	1.79 m (5 ft 10 in)	75 kg (165 lb)	300 cm (120 in)	295 cm (116 in)	(Mongolia) Hasu Megastars
18	Erdembileg Ganbat	9 June 1990	1.96 m (6 ft 5 in)	84 kg (185 lb)	330 cm (130 in)	320 cm (130 in)	(Mongolia) Uurkhaichin

Pool B

Pos	Team	Pld	W	L	Pts	SW	SL	SR	SPW	SPL	SPR	Qualification
1	Iran	2	2	0	6	6	0	MAX	158	122	1.295	Classification for 1–12
2	Pakistan	2	1	1	3	3	3	1.000	140	132	1.061	Classification for 1–12
3	Mongolia	2	0	2	0	0	6	0.000	106	150	0.707	Classification for 13–20

Source: OCA

Date	Time		Score		Set 1	Set 2	Set 3	Set 4	Set 5	Total	Report
20 Aug	12:30	Pakistan	3–0	Mongolia	25–16	25–19	25–14			75–49	Report
24 Aug	09:00	Mongolia	0–3	Iran	18–25	19–25	20–25			57–75	Report
28 Aug	12:30	Nepal	3–1	Mongolia	26–28	25–16	30–28	25–19		106–91	Report
30 Aug	10:00	Mongolia	0–3	Kazakhstan	0–25	0–25	0–25			0–75	Report

== Weightlifting ==
Men

Athlete	Event	Snatch		Clean & Jerk		Total	Rank
Athlete	Event	Result	Rank	Result	Rank	Total	Rank
Munkhdul Enkhjargal	−62 kg	112	12	139	12	251	12

Women

Athlete	Event	Snatch		Clean & Jerk		Total	Rank
Athlete	Event	Result	Rank	Result	Rank	Total	Rank
Baasanjargal Gansereeter	−53 kg	76	9	99	9	175	9

== Wrestling ==
Mongolia entered 12 wrestlers ( 6 men's and 6 women's) at the Games. The contingent has collected two gold, a silver, and three bronze medals. On 3 September 2018, it was announced that Pürevdorjiin Orkhon had tested positive for Stanozolol in a urine test conducted on 20 August 2018. Violating the anti-doping rules, Orkhon was stripped of her gold medal.

Key:

- F – Victory by fall.
- PP – Decision by points – the loser with technical points.
- PO – Decision by points – the loser without technical points.
- ST – Great superiority – the loser without technical points and a margin of victory of at least 8 (Greco-Roman) or 10 (freestyle) points.

Men's freestyle

Athlete	Event	Qualification	Round of 16	Quarterfinal	Semifinal	Repechage 1	Repechage 2	Final / BM	
Athlete	Event	Opposition Result	Opposition Result	Opposition Result	Opposition Result	Opposition Result	Opposition Result	Opposition Result	Rank
Erdenebatyn Bekhbayar	−57 kg	H Vohidov (TJK); W 7–0	Kim S-g (KOR); W 4^{F}–0	M Shavkatov (UZB); W 5–4	R Atri (IRI); W 8–2	Bye	Bye	Kang K-s (PRK); W 8–2	1st place, gold medalist(s)
Batchuluuny Batmagnai	−65 kg	Bye	S Yadav (NEP); W 10–0	Kim K-g (PRK); W 4–3	B Punia (IND); L 0–10	Bye	Bye	S Khasanov (UZB); L 6–10	5
Ganzorigiin Mandakhnaran	−74 kg	Wu Wei (CHN); W 8–4	Y Fujinami (JPN); L 2–13	Did not advance					11
Orgodolyn Üitümen	−86 kg	Bi SF (CHN); W 3^{F}–6	A Gajyýew (TKM); W 10–0	R Kurbanov (UZB); W 6–2	H Yazdani (IRI); L 2–12	Bye	Bye	P Kumar (IND); W 8–1	3rd place, bronze medalist(s)
Ölziisaikhany Batzul	−97 kg	—N/a	B Almentay (KAZ); W 5–4	Kim J-g (KOR); L 2–3	Did not advance	—N/a	Did not advance		7
Natsagsürengiin Zolboo	−125 kg	—N/a	F Anakulov (TJK); W 10–0	D Modzmanashvili (UZB); L 0–3	Did not advance	—N/a	Did not advance		7

Women's freestyle

Athlete	Event	Round of 16	Quarterfinal	Semifinal	Repechage	Final / BM	
Athlete	Event	Opposition Result	Opposition Result	Opposition Result	Opposition Result	Opposition Result	Rank
Erdenesükhiin Narangerel	−50 kg	M Esati (THA); W 10^{F}–2	D Yakhshimuratova (UZB); L 7–4^{F}	Did not advance			7
Erdenechimegiin Sumiyaa	−53 kg	Pinki (IND); W 10–0	Phạm T T (VIE); W 12–2	Z Eshimova (KAZ); L 11–12	Bye	Lee S-h (KOR); W 3^{F}–2	3rd place, bronze medalist(s)
Altantsetsegiin Battsetseg	−57 kg	Bye	Kiều T L (VIE); W 13–1	Pei XR (CHN); L 1–4	Bye	Um J-e (KOR); W 5–2	3rd place, bronze medalist(s)
Pürevdorjiin Orkhon	−62 kg	Bye	Nguyễn T M H (VIE); W 13–1	R Kawai (JPN); W 2^{F}–2	Bye	A Tynybekova (KGZ); W 11–0	1st place, gold medalist(s)
Sharkhüügiin Tümentsetseg	−68 kg	Bye	D Kakran (IND); W 11–1	Chen W-l (TPE); W 11–0	Bye	Zhou F (CHN); L 1–4	2nd place, silver medalist(s)
Ochirbatyn Nasanburmaa	−76 kg	Bye	H Minagawa (JPN); L 1–13	Did not advance	—N/a	A M Kyzy (KGZ); L 2–4	5
