= Turkmenistan at the 2018 Asian Games =

- IOC code: TKM
- NOC: National Olympic Committee of Turkmenistan
- Website: olympic.tm

in Jakarta and Palembang August 18 – September 2
- Flag bearer: Ziyamuhammet Saparov
- Medals Ranked 32nd: Gold 0 Silver 1 Bronze 2 Total 3

Asian Games appearances (overview)
- 1994; 1998; 2002; 2006; 2010; 2014; 2018; 2022; 2026

Turkmenistan competed at the 2018 Asian Games in Jakarta and Palembang, Indonesia, from 18 August to 2 September 2018. Turkmenistan first participated at the Asian Games in 1994 Hiroshima, and at the last edition in Incheon, the country won a silver and a bronze medals.

== Medalists ==
The following Turkmenistan competitors won medals at the Games.

Medal	Name	Sport	Event	Date
Silver	Kristina Şermetowa	Weightlifting	Women's 53 kg	21 Aug
Bronze	Şyhazberdi Öwelekow	Wrestling	Men's Greco-Roman 87 kg	22 Aug
Bronze	Kemal Meredov	Ju-jitsu	Men's 56 kg	24 Aug

Medals by sport
Sport	1st place, gold medalist(s)	2nd place, silver medalist(s)	3rd place, bronze medalist(s)	Total
Weightlifting	0	1	0	1
Wrestling	0	0	1	1
Ju-jitsu	0	0	1	1
Total	0	1	2	3

Medals by day
Day	Date	1st place, gold medalist(s)	2nd place, silver medalist(s)	3rd place, bronze medalist(s)	Total
1	August 19	0	0	0	0
2	August 20	0	0	0	0
3	August 21	0	1	0	1
4	August 22	0	0	1	1
5	August 23	0	0	0	0
6	August 24	0	0	1	1
7	August 25	0	0	0	0
8	August 26	0	0	0	0
9	August 27	0	0	0	0
10	August 28	0	0	0	0
11	August 29	0	0	0	0
12	August 30	0	0	0	0
13	August 31	0	0	0	0
14	September 1	0	0	0	0
15	September 2	0	0	0	0
Total		0	1	2	3

== Competitors ==
The following is a list of the number of competitors representing Turkmenistan that participated at the Games:

Sport	Men	Women	Total
Athletics	1	0	1
Basketball	4	0	4
Boxing	7	0	7
Ju-jitsu	9	2	11
Judo	3	1	4
Kurash	8	6	14
Sambo	4	3	7
Swimming	2	0	2
Weightlifting	2	3	5
Wrestling	10	0	10
Total	50	15	65

== Athletics ==
Turkmenistan entered one male athlete to participate in the athletics competition at the Games.

== Basketball ==
Summary

Team	Event	Group stage						Quarterfinal	Semifinals / Pl.	Final / BM / Pl.	
Team	Event	Opposition Score	Opposition Score	Opposition Score	Opposition Score	Opposition Score	Rank	Opposition Score	Opposition Score	Opposition Score	Rank
Turkmenistan men's	Men's 3x3 tournament	Iraq; L 14−16	Kazakhstan; W 17−13	Afghanistan; W 22−9	Iran; L 7−21	Malaysia; L 13−17	5	Did not advance			

=== 3x3 basketball ===
Turkmenistan national 3x3 team participated in the Games, the men's team placed in the pool D based on the FIBA 3x3 federation ranking.

==== Men's tournament ====
Roster

The following is the Turkmenistan roster in the men's 3x3 basketball tournament of the 2018 Asian Games.

- Kerim Mammetmyradov (4)
- Ahmet Kiyathanov (9)
- Alihan Bekchanov (12)
- Merdan Hojamedov (14)

Pool D

Pos	Team	Pld	W	L	PF	PA	PD	Qualification
1	Iran	5	5	0	99	56	+43	Quarterfinals
2	Kazakhstan	5	3 (Note: Head-to-head result: KAZ 21–18 IRQ.)	2	91	82	+9	Quarterfinals
3	Iraq	5	3	2	90	82	+8	
4	Malaysia	5	2 (Note: Head-to-head result: MAS 17–13 TKM.)	3	82	80	+2	
5	Turkmenistan	5	2	3	73	76	−3	
6	Afghanistan	5	0	5	47	106	−59	

Source: OCA
Notes:

22 August
17:30

Turkmenistan	14–16	Iraq
Pts: Mämmetmyradow 6		Pts: Hasan 10

Gelora Bung Karno Tennis Center Court, Jakarta
Referees: Liu (MAS), Lim (MAS)

22 August
19:00

Kazakhstan	13–17	Turkmenistan
Pts: Litvinenko 8		Pts: Hojamedow 12

Gelora Bung Karno Tennis Center Court, Jakarta
Referees: Ito (JPN), Shi (CHN)

22 August
21:30

Turkmenistan	22–9	Afghanistan
Pts: Mämmetmyradow 10		Pts: Khairi 6

Gelora Bung Karno Tennis Center Court, Jakarta
Referees: Ito (JPN), Al-Harthi (OMA)

25 August
16:00

Iran	21–7	Turkmenistan
Pts: Azari 7		Pts: Bekçanow, Hojamedow 3

Gelora Bung Karno Tennis Center Court, Jakarta
Referees: Ho (HKG), Quinn (INA)

25 August
17:10

Turkmenistan	13–17	Malaysia
Pts: Bekçanow 5		Pts: Wong Y.H. 7

Gelora Bung Karno Tennis Center Court, Jakarta
Referees: Tan (SGP), Ho (HKG)

== Boxing ==
Turkmen Boxing Federation sent their athletes to compete at the Games. After won 11 medals at the 2017 Asian Indoor and Martial Arts Games, the men's and women's boxers has attended international training camps in Ashgabat.

Men

Athlete	Event	Round of 32	Round of 16	Quarterfinals	Semifinals	Final	Rank
Athlete	Event	Opposition Result	Opposition Result	Opposition Result	Opposition Result	Opposition Result	Rank
Jabar Meyleyev	–49 kg	O Ahmadisafa (IRI); L 0–5	Did not advance				
Zarip Jumayev	–52 kg	O T-b (PRK); L 0–5	Did not advance				
Yakub Meredov	–56 kg	Bye	Jo H-n (PRK); L 0–5	Did not advance			
Hursand Imankuliyev	–60 kg	A Morisaka (JPN); W 5–0	Choe C-m (PRK); W 5–0	E Tsendbaatar (MGL); L 0–5	Did not advance		
Muhammet Berdibayev	–64 kg	KA Ezirej (IRQ); L 0–5	Did not advance				
Timur Tajimov	–69 kg	Bye	S Ardee (THA); L 0–5	Did not advance			
Nursahet Pazzyyev	–75 kg	Bye	TE Tanglatihan (CHN); L 1–4	Did not advance			

== Ju-jitsu ==
Key:

- ADV – Won by advantages.
- PNT – Won by penalties.
- RDC – Won by referee decision.
- SUB – Won by submission.

Men

Athlete	Event	Round of 64	Round of 32	Round of 16	Quarterfinals	Semifinals	Repechage	Final / BM	Rank
Athlete	Event	Opposition Result	Opposition Result	Opposition Result	Opposition Result	Opposition Result	Opposition Result	Opposition Result	Rank
Kemal Meredow	–56 kg	—	D Marazykov (KGZ); W 2–0	A Khan (PAK); W 0^{ADV}–0	N Seiduali (KAZ); L 0–100^{SUB}	Did not advance	D Ruziev (UZB); W 6–3	Ö Erdenebaatar (MGL); W 0^{RDC}–0	3rd place, bronze medalist(s)
Mirali Agaýew	–62 kg	—	B Mönkhbaatar (MGL); W 100^{SUB}–0	AR Eidi (IRI); W 100^{SUB}–0	S Al-Mazrouei (UAE); L 0–5	Did not advance	A Kekenov (KGZ); W 0^{ADV}–0	F Al-Harahsheh (JOR); L 0–5	–
Ýusup Taňryberdiýew	–62 kg	—	S Abdulnazarov (TJK); L 0–2	Did not advance					
Jelilmuhammet Hojamyradow	–69 kg	—	F Tirta (INA); W 2–0	V Khaou (CAM); W 4–0	TB Uulu (KGZ); L 0–2	Did not advance	A Ahmed (IRQ); W 2–0	N Kazhekov (KAZ); L 0–0^{ADV}	–
Arslan Setdarow	–69 kg	—	Z Uranov (KGZ); L 0–2	Did not advance					
Allamyrat Garaýew	–77 kg	Bye	AS Ayash (YEM); W 2–0 ^{DSQ}	T Mönkh (MGL); L 0–0^{ADV}	Did not advance				
Rahmet Taganow	–77 kg	Bye	A Mustakov (KGZ); L 0–0^{RDC}	Did not advance					
Mergen Joraýew	–85 kg	—	U Tsutsoev (KAZ); W 4–0	K Sangsin (THA); W 100^{SUB}–0	H Al-Rasheed (JOR); L 0–4	Did not advance	Q Maraaba (PLE); W 100^{SUB}–0	M Murtazaliev (KGZ); L 0–0^{RDC}	–
Nejimetdin Çaryýew	–94 kg	—	Z Granduke (JOR); DSQ	Did not advance					

Women

Athlete	Event	Round of 32	Round of 16	Quarterfinals	Semifinals	Repechage	Final / BM	Rank
Athlete	Event	Opposition Result	Opposition Result	Opposition Result	Opposition Result	Opposition Result	Opposition Result	Rank
Saýara Awezmetowa	–49 kg	Bye	Dương TTM (VIE); L 0–3	Did not advance				
Wioletta Krowýakowa	–62 kg	A Kurbanova (KAZ); W 3–0	R Qubbaj (JOR); DSQ	B Al-Matrooshi (UAE); W 7–0	C Lien (SGP); L 0–6	Bye	Y Kakish (JOR); L 0–0^{ADV}	–

== Judo ==
Turkmenistan participated in judo at the Games with 4 judokas (3 men's and 1 women's).

Key:

- 1st number — Ippon
- 2nd number — Waza-ari
- s — Shido

Men

Athlete	Event	Round of 32	Round of 16	Quarterfinals	Semifinals	Repechage	Final / BM	Rank
Athlete	Event	Opposition Result	Opposition Result	Opposition Result	Opposition Result	Opposition Result	Opposition Result	Rank
Muhammet Kossekov	–66 kg	Wu ZQ (CHN); L 00s3–10	Did not advance					
Tejen Tejenov	–90 kg	Bye	H Manurung (INA); W 10–00	Gwak D-h (KOR); L 00s3–11s2	Did not advance	I Bozbayev (KAZ); L 00–10s1	Did not advance	
Batyr Hojamuhammedov	–100 kg	Bye	Lu G-z (TPE); W 10–00	K Iida (JPN); L 00s1–10	Did not advance	S Juraev (UZB); L 00s1–10s1	Did not advance	

Women

Athlete	Event	Round of 32	Round of 16	Quarterfinals	Semifinals	Repechage	Final / BM	Rank
Athlete	Event	Opposition Result	Opposition Result	Opposition Result	Opposition Result	Opposition Result	Opposition Result	Rank
Gülbadam Babamuratowa	–52 kg	Bye	K Beldiagina (KGZ); W 01–00s2	G Gantsetseg (MGL); L 00–11	Did not advance	G Ziyaeva (UZB); L 00–10	Did not advance	

== Kurash ==
Men

Athlete	Event	Round of 32	Round of 16	Quarterfinal	Semifinal	Final	
Athlete	Event	Opposition Score	Opposition Score	Opposition Score	Opposition Score	Opposition Score	Rank
Şamuhammet Kurbanow	–66 kg	B Khalimov (TJK); L 011−100	Did not advance				
Marat Orazow	–66 kg	M Chakmar (AFG); W 010−000	A Batsuuri (MGL); W 001−000	M Gaybulloev (UZB); L 000−101	Did not advance		
Nedir Allaberdiýew	–81 kg	E Aliakbari (IRI); L 000−102	Did not advance				
Daýanç Omirow	–81 kg	O Tiztak (IRI); L 001−111	Did not advance				
Sanjar Abdyrahmanow	–90 kg	B Gonchigsüren (MGL); W 103−001	S Jandreev (UZB); L 001−012	Did not advance			
Guwanç Begaliýew	–90 kg	Bye	J Balabal (PHI); W 102−000	Y Imamov (UZB); L 001−010	Did not advance		
Hudaýberdi Jumaýew	+90 kg	Bye	T Kuralov (KGZ); L 001−100	Did not advance			
Daýanç Taganow	+90 kg	AP Chandran (IND); W 110−000	K Tsogtgerel (MGL); W 010−002	M Sarwari (AFG); L 002−011	Did not advance		

Women

Athlete	Event	Round of 32	Round of 16	Quarterfinal	Semifinal	Final	
Athlete	Event	Opposition Score	Opposition Score	Opposition Score	Opposition Score	Opposition Score	Rank
Anastasiýa Makeýewa	–52 kg	E Nürzedmaa (MGL); W 110−000	O Abdumajidova (UZB); L 001−011	Did not advance			
Zarina Saparowa	–52 kg	Bye	M Jadhav (IND); L 002−002	Did not advance			
Mähriban Kurbanowa	–63 kg	B Baasanjargal (MGL); L 001−012	Did not advance				
Gülşat Nasyrowa	–63 kg	N Undrakhzayaa (MGL); W 011−001	M Tokas (IND); L 001−010	Did not advance			
Mariýa Lohowa	–78 kg	Bye	J Tokas (IND); W 110−000	Yang H-t (TPE); L 001−002	Did not advance		
Jahan Muhammedowa	–78 kg	Kao C-j (TPE); W 012−001	Z Bagheri (IRI); L 000−012	Did not advance			

== Sambo ==
Key:

- SU – Won by submission.
- TT – Won by total throw.

Athlete	Event	Round of 32	Round of 16	Quarterfinal	Semifinal	Repechage 1	Repechage 2	Repechage final	Final / BM	
Athlete	Event	Opposition Result	Opposition Result	Opposition Result	Opposition Result	Opposition Result	Opposition Result	Opposition Result	Opposition Result	Rank
Gurtgeldi Gurtgeldiýew	Men's 52 kg	Bye	K Yamamoto (JPN); L 1–3	Did not advance						
Ýagmyr Orazdurdyýew	Men's 52 kg	Bye	M Ghusn (SYR); L 2–3	Did not advance						
Ruslan Esgerow	Men's 90 kg	Bye	A Aitbek (KAZ); L 1–1	Did not advance		M Ali (BRN); W ^{Dsq}	N Yokubov (UZB); W 2–1	RA Bahari (INA); W 8–0	K Ustopiriyon (TJK); L 0–3^{SU}	4
Nurberdihan Orazmämmedow	Men's 90 kg	Bye	T Tampapanna (THA); W 9–0	K Ustopiriyon (TJK); L 1–7	Did not advance	Bye	A Zekenov (KAZ); L 0–2	Did not advance		
Aziza Nazarowa	Women's 48 kg	—	AZ Kyzy (KGZ); L 0–1	Did not advance			—	Did not advance		
Aýna Zaripowa	Women's 48 kg	—	M Turgunbaeva (UZB); L 0–4^{SU}	Did not advance		E Bahrami (IRI); W 1–0	—	A Zhylkybayeva (KAZ); L 0–2	Did not advance	
Zyba Orunowa	Women's 68 kg	Bye	M Amanda (INA); L 1–5	Did not advance						

== Swimming ==
Men

Athlete	Event	Heats		Final	
Athlete	Event	Time	Rank	Time	Rank
Merdan Atayev	50 m backstroke	26.08	8 Q	25.88	8
Merdan Atayev	100 m backstroke	56.20	10	Did not advance	
Batyr Tachmyradov	50 m breaststroke	31.53	28	Did not advance	
Batyr Tachmyradov	100 m breaststroke	1:08.28	26	Did not advance	
Batyr Tachmyradov	200 m breaststroke	2:29.15	17	Did not advance	

== Weightlifting ==
Men

Athlete	Event	Snatch		Clean & jerk		Total	Rank
Athlete	Event	Result	Rank	Result	Rank	Total	Rank
Daýanç Asyrow	−85 kg	150	8	175	7	325	7
Hojamuhammet Toýçyýew	+105 kg	190	4	235	4	425	4

Women

Athlete	Event	Snatch		Clean & jerk		Total	Rank
Athlete	Event	Result	Rank	Result	Rank	Total	Rank
Kristina Şermetowa	−53 kg	93	1	113	3	206	2nd place, silver medalist(s)
Gülnabat Kadyrowa	−75 kg	93	7	118	6	211	6
Aysoltan Toychyyeva	−75 kg	~~88~~	DNF	—	—	—	—

== Wrestling ==
Turkmenistan set-up ten men's wrestler to compete at the Games. Şyhazberdi Öwelekow won a bronze medal in the Greco-Roman 87 kg, became the only medal for the contingent in the wrestling competition. Rüstem Nazarow who competed in freestyle 57 kg originally got the 11th place, but was disqualified after he tested positive for Furosemide in a pre-tournament urine test.

Key:

- F – Victory by fall.
- PP – Decision by points – the loser with technical points.
- PO – Decision by points – the loser without technical points.
- ST – Great superiority – the loser without technical points and a margin of victory of at least 8 (Greco-Roman) or 10 (freestyle) points.

Men's freestyle

Athlete	Event	Qualification	Round of 16	Quarterfinal	Semifinal	Repechage 1	Repechage 2	Final / BM	
Athlete	Event	Opposition Result	Opposition Result	Opposition Result	Opposition Result	Opposition Result	Opposition Result	Opposition Result	Rank
Rüstem Nazarow	−57 kg	Bye	S Tomar (IND); L 8–12	Did not advance					11 DSQ
Batyr Borjakow	−65 kg	Bye	A Darmansyah (INA); W 11–1	D Takatani (JPN); L 2–13	Did not advance	Bye	M Hussain (PAK); W 11–0	Okassov (KAZ); L 2–5	5
Döwletmyrat Orazgylyjow	−74 kg	Bye	Hosseinkhani (IRI); L 2–12	Did not advance					15
Azat Gajyýew	−86 kg	Bye	Üitümen (MGL); L 0–10	Did not advance					15
Zyamuhammet Saparow	−97 kg	—	M Musaev (KGZ); L 2–8	Did not advance		N Ahmadi (AFG); L 6–17	—	Did not advance	8
Söhbet Belliýew	−125 kg	—	Bye	Nam K-j (KOR); L 0–12	Did not advance		—	Did not advance	13

Men's Greco-Roman

Athlete	Event	Round of 16	Quarterfinal	Semifinal	Repechage	Final / BM	
Athlete	Event	Opposition Result	Opposition Result	Opposition Result	Opposition Result	Opposition Result	Rank
Seýdylla Täzäýew	−67 kg	Tasmuradov (UZB); L 0–9	Did not advance				15
Şermet Permanow	−77 kg	B S Badr (QAT); W 5–0	B Khasanov (TJK); W 5^{F}–0	Makhmudov (KGZ); L 0–8	Bye	Kim H-w (KOR); L 0–9	5
Şyhazberdi Öwelekow	−87 kg	Bye	H Nouri (IRI); L 4–13	Did not advance	Bye	M Al-Quhali (YEM); W 8–0	3rd place, bronze medalist(s)
Süleýman Belliýew	−130 kg	Bye	A Sonoda (JPN); L 1–9	Did not advance			9
