= Ju-jitsu at the 2018 Asian Games – Women's 62 kg =

Women's jiu-jitsu 62 kg at the 2018 Asian Games
- Venue: Jakarta Convention Center
- Dates: 25 August 2018
- Competitors: 23 from 15 nations

Medalists
gold medal	Sung Ki-ra	South Korea
silver medal	Constance Lien	Singapore
bronze medal	Yara Kakish	Jordan
bronze medal	Tsogkhüügiin Udval	Mongolia

The women's jiu-jitsu (ne-waza) 62 kilograms Ju-jitsu competition at the 2018 Asian Games in Jakarta was held on 25 August 2018 at the Jakarta Convention Center Assembly Hall. Ju-jitsu made its debut at the 2018 Asian Games. Earlier, it was incorporated into the 2017 Asian Indoor and Martial Arts Games.

== Schedule ==
All times are Western Indonesia Time (UTC+07:00)

Date	Time	Event
Saturday, 25 August 2018	10:00	1/16 finals
Saturday, 25 August 2018	10:00	1/8 finals
Saturday, 25 August 2018	10:00	1/4 finals
Saturday, 25 August 2018	10:00	Final of repechage
Saturday, 25 August 2018	10:00	Final of tables
Saturday, 25 August 2018	16:00	Finals

== Results ==
Legend

- DQ — Won by disqualification
- SU — Won by submission (100–0)

=== Main bracket ===
==== Final ====
Final
Sung Ki-ra (KOR)	4
Constance Lien (SGP)	2

==== Top half ====
1/16 finals
Annie Ramirez (PHI)	0
Sung Ki-ra (KOR)	21
Orapa Senatham (THA)	3
Nasim Mohammadi (IRI)	0
Ilma Yeni Megawati (INA)	0
Yara Kakish (JOR)	2^{SU}

1/8 finals
Sung Ki-ra (KOR)	26
Orapa Senatham (THA)	0
Yara Kakish (JOR)	0
Galina Duvanova (KAZ)	0
May Ooi (SGP)	0
Hessa Al-Shamsi (UAE)	0
Nguyễn Thị Hương (VIE)	0
Tsogkhüügiin Udval (MGL)	0

1/4 finals
Sung Ki-ra (KOR)	2
Yara Kakish (JOR)	0
Hessa Al-Shamsi (UAE)	0
Tsogkhüügiin Udval (MGL)	3

Final of tables
Sung Ki-ra (KOR)	5
Tsogkhüügiin Udval (MGL)	0

==== Bottom half ====
1/16 finals
Bashayer Al-Matrooshi (UAE)	17^{SU}
Fatima Sultani (AFG)	0
Wioletta Krowýakowa (TKM)	3
Aidyam Kurbanova (KAZ)	0
Battsogtyn Buyandelger (MGL)	2
Constance Lien (SGP)	0^{SU}
Onanong Sangsirichok (THA)	3
Apryl Eppinger (PHI)	0

1/8 finals
Bashayer Al-Matrooshi (UAE)	DQ
Farah Al-Zahrani (KSA)
Wioletta Krowýakowa (TKM)	DQ
Rana Qubbaj (JOR)
Constance Lien (SGP)	10^{SU}
Onanong Sangsirichok (THA)	4
Simone Julia (INA)	DQ
Makhliyo Mannonova (UZB)

1/4 finals
Bashayer Al-Matrooshi (UAE)	0
Wioletta Krowýakowa (TKM)	7
Constance Lien (SGP)	12
Simone Julia (INA)	0

Final of tables
Wioletta Krowýakowa (TKM)	0
Constance Lien (SGP)	6

=== Repechage ===
Final of repechage
Yara Kakish (JOR)	3^{SU}
Hessa Al-Shamsi (UAE)	0
Bashayer Al-Matrooshi (UAE)	0
Simone Julia (INA)	2

Bronze medals
Yara Kakish (JOR)	0
Wioletta Krowýakowa (TKM)	0
Simone Julia (INA)	2
Tsogkhüügiin Udval (MGL)	2
