= Kurash at the 2018 Asian Games – Women's 78 kg =

Women's 78 kg at the 2018 Asian Games
- Venue: Jakarta Convention Center
- Dates: 30 August 2018
- Competitors: 18 from 10 nations

Medalists
| silver medal | Otgony Mönkhtsetseg | Mongolia |
| bronze medal | Yang Hsien-tzu | Chinese Taipei |
| bronze medal | Nguyễn Thị Lan | Vietnam |

The women's Kurash 78 kilograms competition at the 2018 Asian Games in Jakarta, Indonesia was held on 30 August at the JCC Assembly Hall.

Kurash is a traditional martial art from Uzbekistan that resembles wrestling. There are three assessment system in Kurash, namely Halal, Yambosh, and Chala. Halal is if an athlete Kurash is able to slam his opponent in the back. Yambosh is the imperfect of Halal, two Yambosh same as Halal.

== Schedule ==
All times are Western Indonesia Time (UTC+07:00)

| Date | Time | Event |
|---|---|---|
| Thursday, 30 August 2018 | 14:00 | Round of 32 |
| Thursday, 30 August 2018 | 14:00 | Round of 16 |
| Thursday, 30 August 2018 | 14:00 | Quarterfinals |
| Thursday, 30 August 2018 | 17:00 | Semifinals |
| Thursday, 30 August 2018 | 17:00 | Final |

== Results ==
=== Final ===
| Final |
| Kumush Yuldashova (UZB) | 101 |
| Otgony Mönkhtsetseg (MGL) | 010 |

=== Top half ===
Round of 32
Prawanwit Meesri (THA) | 001
Jyoti Tokas (IND) | 001

Round of 16
Jyoti Tokas (IND) | 000
Mariýa Lohowa (TKM) | 110
Ganbaataryn Minjinsor (MGL) | 000
Yang Hsien-tzu (TPE) | 100
Kalzhan Taizhanova (KAZ) | 012
Trần Thị Thanh Thủy (VIE) | 000
Kumush Yuldashova (UZB) | 110
Szalsza Maulida (INA) | 001

Quarterfinals
Mariýa Lohowa (TKM) | 001
Yang Hsien-tzu (TPE) | 002
Kalzhan Taizhanova (KAZ) | 000
Kumush Yuldashova (UZB) | 101

Semifinals
Yang Hsien-tzu (TPE) | 010
Kumush Yuldashova (UZB) | 101

=== Bottom half ===
Round of 32
Jahan Muhammedowa (TKM) | 012
Kao Chia-jing (TPE) | 001

Round of 16
Jahan Muhammedowa (TKM) | 000
Zahra Bagheri (IRI) | 012
Otgony Mönkhtsetseg (MGL) | 111
Marselina Papara (INA) | 000
Dilroza Bozorova (UZB) | 000
Galiyabanu Amankhanova (KAZ) | 100
Nguyễn Thị Lan (VIE) | 011
Amisha Tokas (IND) | 001

Quarterfinals
Zahra Bagheri (IRI) | 001
Otgony Mönkhtsetseg (MGL) | 002
Galiyabanu Amankhanova (KAZ) | 010
Nguyễn Thị Lan (VIE) | 010

Semifinals
Otgony Mönkhtsetseg (MGL) | 110
Nguyễn Thị Lan (VIE) | 000

- Kumush Yuldashova of Uzbekistan originally won the gold medal, but was disqualified after she tested positive for Stanozolol.
