= Sambo at the 2018 Asian Games – Men's 52 kg =

Men's 52 kg at the 2018 Asian Games
- Venue: Jakarta Convention Center
- Date: 31 August 2018
- Competitors: 17 from 10 nations

Medalists
| gold medal | Baglan Ibragim | Kazakhstan |
| silver medal | Shaaluugiin Erdenebaatar | Mongolia |
| bronze medal | Beimbet Kanzhanov | Kazakhstan |
| bronze medal | Akhmad Rakhmatilloev | Uzbekistan |

The men's sport sambo 52 kilograms competition at the 2018 Asian Games in Jakarta was held on 31 August 2018 at the Jakarta Convention Center Assembly Hall.

== Schedule ==
All times are Western Indonesia Time (UTC+07:00)

| Date | Time | Event |
|---|---|---|
| Friday, 31 August 2018 | 15:00 | Round of 32 |
| Friday, 31 August 2018 | 15:00 | Round of 16 |
| Friday, 31 August 2018 | 15:00 | Quarterfinals |
| Friday, 31 August 2018 | 15:00 | Repechages |
| Friday, 31 August 2018 | 15:00 | Semifinals |
| Friday, 31 August 2018 | 18:30 | Finals |

== Results ==
Legend

- DQ — Won by disqualification
- SU — Won by submission
- WO — Won by walkover

=== Main bracket ===
==== Final ====
| Final |
| Baglan Ibragim (KAZ) | 2^{SU} |
| Shaaluugiin Erdenebaatar (MGL) | 4 |

==== Top half ====
Round of 32
Soheil Jamalabadi (IRI) | 0
Khasani Dzhomii (TJK) | 1^{SU}

Round of 16
Khasani Dzhomii (TJK) | 0^{SU}
Islom Akhmedjanov (UZB) | 3
Tilek Amankulov (KGZ) | 1
Imam Maulana Muttaqin (INA) | 3
Kota Yamamoto (JPN) | 3
Gurtgeldi Gurtgeldiýew (TKM) | 1
Genendaramyn Mönkhbat (MGL) | 0
Baglan Ibragim (KAZ) | 4^{DQ}

Quarterfinals
Khasani Dzhomii (TJK) | 1^{SU}
Imam Maulana Muttaqin (INA) | 0
Kota Yamamoto (JPN) | 0
Baglan Ibragim (KAZ) | 2^{SU}

Semifinals
Khasani Dzhomii (TJK) | 3
Baglan Ibragim (KAZ) | 4

==== Bottom half ====
Round of 32

Round of 16
Somon Sangov (TJK) | 1
Beimbet Kanzhanov (KAZ) | 2
Mohamad Wahyudi (INA) | 1
Akhmad Rakhmatilloev (UZB) | 3
Ýagmyr Orazdurdyýew (TKM) | 2
Munir Ghusn (SYR) | 3
Azamat Asakeev (KGZ) | 5
Shaaluugiin Erdenebaatar (MGL) | 7

Quarterfinals
Beimbet Kanzhanov (KAZ) | 5
Akhmad Rakhmatilloev (UZB) | 1
Munir Ghusn (SYR) | 0
Shaaluugiin Erdenebaatar (MGL) | 3

Semifinals
Beimbet Kanzhanov (KAZ) | 0
Shaaluugiin Erdenebaatar (MGL) | 8

=== Repechage ===
Repechage round 1
Soheil Jamalabadi (IRI) | 0
Islom Akhmedjanov (UZB) | 1

Repechage round 2
Islom Akhmedjanov (UZB) | WO
Imam Maulana Muttaqin (INA)
Genendaramyn Mönkhbat (MGL)
Kota Yamamoto (JPN) | DQ
Somon Sangov (TJK) | 0
Akhmad Rakhmatilloev (UZB) | 3
Azamat Asakeev (KGZ) | 1
Munir Ghusn (SYR) | 2

Final of repechage
Islom Akhmedjanov (UZB) | 0^{SU}
Kota Yamamoto (JPN) | 0
Akhmad Rakhmatilloev (UZB) | 4
Munir Ghusn (SYR) | 0

Bronze medals
Islom Akhmedjanov (UZB) | 3
Beimbet Kanzhanov (KAZ) | 4
Akhmad Rakhmatilloev (UZB) | 1
Khasani Dzhomii (TJK) | 0
