= Ju-jitsu at the 2018 Asian Games – Men's 56 kg =

Men's jiu-jitsu 56 kg at the 2018 Asian Games
- Venue: Jakarta Convention Center
- Dates: 24 August 2018
- Competitors: 22 from 14 nations

Medalists
gold medal	Hamad Nawad	United Arab Emirates
silver medal	Khalid Al-Blooshi	United Arab Emirates
bronze medal	Nurzhan Seiduali	Kazakhstan
bronze medal	Kemal Meredow	Turkmenistan

The men's jiu-jitsu (ne-waza) 56 kilograms Ju-jitsu competition at the 2018 Asian Games in Jakarta was held on 24 August 2018 at the Jakarta Convention Center Assembly Hall. Ju-jitsu made its debut at the 2018 Asian Games. Earlier, it was incorporated into the 2017 Asian Indoor and Martial Arts Games.

== Schedule ==
All times are Western Indonesia Time (UTC+07:00)

Date	Time	Event
Friday, 24 August 2018	10:00	1/16 finals
Friday, 24 August 2018	10:00	1/8 finals
Friday, 24 August 2018	10:00	1/4 finals
Friday, 24 August 2018	10:00	Final of repechage
Friday, 24 August 2018	10:00	Final of tables
Friday, 24 August 2018	16:00	Finals

== Results ==
Legend

- DQ — Won by disqualification
- SU — Won by submission (100–0)

=== Main bracket ===
==== Final ====
Final
Hamad Nawad (UAE)	0^{SU}
Khalid Al-Blooshi (UAE)	2

==== Top half ====
1/16 finals
Mohammed Ismael (IRQ)	2
Akmal Amirov (UZB)	6
Suwijak Kuntong (THA)	9
Mehran Sattar (IRI)	0
Liu Hsungkang (CHN)
Ariet Bekishov (KGZ)	DQ

1/8 finals
Akmal Amirov (UZB)	13
Suwijak Kuntong (THA)	4
Ariet Bekishov (KGZ)	0
Hamad Nawad (UAE)	2
Gian Dee (PHI)	0
Ölziitogtokhyn Erdenebaatar (MGL)	0
Ananda Mauludy Ikhsan (INA)	2
Kuandyk Konyssov (KAZ)	2

1/4 finals
Akmal Amirov (UZB)	4
Hamad Nawad (UAE)	4
Ölziitogtokhyn Erdenebaatar (MGL)	4
Kuandyk Konyssov (KAZ)	0

Final of tables
Hamad Nawad (UAE)	5
Ölziitogtokhyn Erdenebaatar (MGL)	3

==== Bottom half ====
1/16 finals
Nurzhan Seiduali (KAZ)	0^{SU}
Jan Vincent Cortez (PHI)	2
Davron Marazykov (KGZ)	0
Kemal Meredow (TKM)	2
Doston Ruziev (UZB)	4
Gantömöriin Bayanduuren (MGL)	0

1/8 finals
Nurzhan Seiduali (KAZ)	6^{SU}
Handoko Wahyu Hidayat (INA)	0
Kemal Meredow (TKM)	0
Shahid Khan (PAK)	0
Doston Ruziev (UZB)	6
Payoongsak Singchalad (THA)	0
Đào Hồng Sơn (VIE)	0
Khalid Al-Blooshi (UAE)	0^{SU}

1/4 finals
Nurzhan Seiduali (KAZ)	0^{SU}
Kemal Meredow (TKM)	2
Doston Ruziev (UZB)	0
Khalid Al-Blooshi (UAE)	4

Final of tables
Nurzhan Seiduali (KAZ)	0
Khalid Al-Blooshi (UAE)	5

=== Repechage ===
Final of repechage
Akmal Amirov (UZB)	0^{SU}
Kuandyk Konyssov (KAZ)	2
Kemal Meredow (TKM)	6
Doston Ruziev (UZB)	3

Bronze medals
Akmal Amirov (UZB)	2
Nurzhan Seiduali (KAZ)	4
Kemal Meredow (TKM)	0
Ölziitogtokhyn Erdenebaatar (MGL)	0
