= Jordan at the 2018 Asian Games =

- IOC code: JOR
- NOC: Jordan Olympic Committee
- Website: www.joc.jo

in Jakarta and Palembang August 18 – September 2
- Competitors: 45 in 9 sports
- Flag bearer: Ahmad Abu-Ghaush
- Medals Ranked 23rd: Gold 2 Silver 1 Bronze 9 Total 12

Asian Games appearances (overview)
- 1986; 1990; 1994; 1998; 2002; 2006; 2010; 2014; 2018; 2022; 2026

Jordan competed in the 2018 Asian Games in Jakarta and Palembang, Indonesia from 18 August to 2 September 2018. This was Jordan's eighth time competing in the Asian Games, following their first participation in 1986 Seoul. The team has won a total of 33 medals since, including three gold, 15 silver and 15 bronze.

== Medalists ==
The following Jordan competitors won medals at the Games.

Medal	Name	Sport	Event	Date
Gold	Julyana Al-Sadeq	Taekwondo	Women's 67 kg	20 Aug
Gold	Haidar Al-Rasheed	Ju-jitsu	Men's 85 kg	26 Aug
Silver	Zaid Granduke	Ju-jitsu	Men's 94 kg	25 Aug
Bronze	Hamza Kattan	Taekwondo	Men's +80 kg	21 Aug
Bronze	Saleh El-Sharabaty	Taekwondo	Men's 80 kg	22 Aug
Bronze	Ahmad Abu-Ghaush	Taekwondo	Men's 68 kg	23 Aug
Bronze	Yara Kakish	Ju-jitsu	Women's 62 kg	25 Aug
Bronze	Freeh Al-Harahsheh	Ju-jitsu	Men's 62 kg	25 Aug
Bronze	Abdelkarim Al-Rashid	Ju-jitsu	Men's 77 kg	26 Aug
Bronze	Abdelrahman Al-Masatfa	Karate	Men's kumite 67 kg	26 Aug
Bronze	Bashar Al-Najjar	Karate	Men's kumite 75 kg	27 Aug
Bronze	Zeyad Eashash	Boxing	Men's 69 kg	1 Sep

Medals by sport
Sport	1st place, gold medalist(s)	2nd place, silver medalist(s)	3rd place, bronze medalist(s)	Total
Boxing	0	0	1	1
Ju-jitsu	1	1	3	5
Karate	0	0	2	2
Taekwondo	1	0	3	4
Total	2	1	9	12

Medals by day
Day	Date	1st place, gold medalist(s)	2nd place, silver medalist(s)	3rd place, bronze medalist(s)	Total
1	August 19	0	0	0	0
2	August 20	1	0	0	1
3	August 21	0	0	1	1
4	August 22	0	0	1	1
5	August 23	0	0	1	1
6	August 24	0	0	0	0
7	August 25	0	1	2	3
8	August 26	1	0	2	3
9	August 27	0	0	1	1
10	August 28	0	0	0	0
11	August 29	0	0	0	0
12	August 30	0	0	0	0
13	August 31	0	0	0	0
14	September 1	0	0	1	1
15	September 2	0	0	0	0
Total		2	1	9	12

== Competitors ==
The following is a list of the number of competitors representing Jordan that participated at the Games:

Sport	Men	Women	Total
Athletics	0	1	1
Basketball	4	0	4
Boxing	3	0	3
Contract bridge	8	2	10
Ju-jitsu	9	2	11
Judo	1	0	1
Karate	4	2	6
Swimming	3	0	3
Taekwondo	4	2	6
Total	36	9	45

== Athletics ==
Jordan entered one women's athlete to participate in the athletics competition at the Games.

== Basketball ==
Summary

Team	Event	Group Stage						Quarterfinal	Semifinals / Pl.	Final / BM / Pl.	
Team	Event	Opposition Score	Opposition Score	Opposition Score	Opposition Score	Opposition Score	Rank	Opposition Score	Opposition Score	Opposition Score	Rank
Jordan men's	Men's 3x3 tournament	Syria; L 19−21	Japan; L 7−22	Maldives; W Disq.	Qatar; L 7−21	Nepal; L 10−21	5	did not advance			

=== 3x3 basketball ===
Jordan national 3x3 team participated in the Games, the men's team placed in the pool C based on the FIBA 3x3 federation ranking.

==== Men's tournament ====
Roster

The following is the Jordan roster in the men's 3x3 basketball tournament of the 2018 Asian Games.

- Rayyan Jarrad
- Hanna Juha
- Omar Bukhari
- Shaker Shubair

Pool C

Pos	Team	Pld	W	L	PF	PA	PD	Qualification
1	Japan	5	5	0	86	46	+40	Quarterfinals
2	Qatar	5	4	1	74	43	+31	Quarterfinals
3	Syria	5	3	2	62	76	−14	
4	Nepal	5	2	3	59	74	−15	
5	Jordan	5	1	4	43	85	−42	
—	Maldives	5	0	5	0	0	0	

Source: OCA

21 August
17:30

Jordan	19–21	Syria
Pts: Juha 7		Pts: Khouri 8

Gelora Bung Karno Tennis Center Court, Jakarta
Referees: Shi (CHN), Quinn (INA)

21 August
19:20

Jordan	7–22	Japan
Pts: Juha 5		Pts: Arakawa 10

Gelora Bung Karno Tennis Center Court, Jakarta
Referees: Ho (HKG), Lim (MAS)

24 August
17:50

Jordan	vs.	Maldives
Forfeit

Gelora Bung Karno Tennis Center Court, Jakarta

24 August
15:00

Qatar	21–7	Jordan
Pts: Dieng 9		Pts: Juha 3

Gelora Bung Karno Tennis Center Court, Jakarta
Referees: Ho (HKG), Quinn (INA)

24 August
16:50

Nepal	21–10	Jordan
Pts: Basnet 13		Pts: Jarrad 4

Gelora Bung Karno Tennis Center Court, Jakarta
Referees: Quinn (INA), Liu (MAS)

== Boxing ==
The boxers team was named on 16 July 2018.

Men

Athlete	Event	Round of 32	Round of 16	Quarterfinals	Semifinals	Final	Rank
Athlete	Event	Opposition Result	Opposition Result	Opposition Result	Opposition Result	Opposition Result	Rank
Mohammad Alwadi	–56 kg	Bye	M Mirzakhalilov (UZB); L 0–5	did not advance			
Obada Al-Kasbeh	–64 kg	B Thapa (NEP); W 4–0	I Kholdarov (UZB); L 0–5	did not advance			
Zeyad Eashash	–69 kg	Bye	Trần ĐT (VIE); L 1–4	T Tharumalingam (QAT); W 5–0	A Shymbergenov (KAZ); L 0–5	Did not advance	3rd place, bronze medalist(s)

== Contract bridge ==
Men

Athlete	Event	Qualification		Semifinal		Final	
Athlete	Event	Point	Rank	Point	Rank	Point	Rank
Iskandar Imasaih; Sakher Makawi; Amr Agha Nimer; Jawan Hallasa; Fadi Sweidan; Mohd Zafer Jarrar	Team	77.67	12	did not advance			

Mixed

Athlete	Event	Qualification		Semifinal		Final	
Athlete	Event	Point	Rank	Point	Rank	Point	Rank
Sireen Barakat; Farah Tambulat; Marwan Ghanem; Samer Al-Rawashdeh	Team	101.59	8	did not advance			

== Ju-jitsu ==
Key:

- ADV – Won by advantages.
- PNT – Won by penalties.
- RDC – Won by referee decision.
- SUB – Won by submission.

Men

Athlete	Event	Round of 64	Round of 32	Round of 16	Quarterfinals	Semifinals	Repechage	Final / BM	Rank
Athlete	Event	Opposition Result	Opposition Result	Opposition Result	Opposition Result	Opposition Result	Opposition Result	Opposition Result	Rank
Freeh Al-Harahsheh	–62 kg	—	Bye	HB Safari (AFG); W 13–0	D Hilal (LBN); W 2–0	O Al-Fadhli (UAE); L 0–2	Bye	M Agaýew (TKM); W 5–0	3rd place, bronze medalist(s)
Ghaleb Al-Harahsheh	–69 kg	—	N Al-Faraj (KUW); W 4^{ADV}–4	J Saputera (INA); W 10–0	N Kazhekov (KAZ); L 0–0^{ADV}	Did not advance	Z Uranov (KGZ); L 0–100^{SUB}	did not advance	
Abdallah Nabas	–69 kg	—	A Ahmed (IRQ); L 2–2^{ADV}	did not advance					
Abdelkarim Al-Rasheed	–77 kg	Bye	Lee T-y (TPE); W 2–0	H Amraei (IRI); W 2–0	T Mönkh (MGL); W 2–2	N Alymkulov (KGZ); L 0–2	Bye	S Al-Hammadi (UAE); W 0^{PNT}–0	3rd place, bronze medalist(s)
Hamzeh Al-Rasheed	–77 kg	Bye	M Sham (SYR); W 100^{SUB}–0	R Israilov (KAZ); L 0–0^{RDC}	did not advance				
Bader Al-Kuzai	–85 kg	—	Bye	A Gavriluk (KAZ); L 0–0^{ADV}	did not advance				
Haidar Al-Rasheed	–85 kg	—	Bye	H Ranjbar (IRI); W 10–0	M Joraýew (TKM); W 4–0	A Murtazaliev (KGZ); W 0^{ADV}–0	—	K Balhol (UAE); WO	1st place, gold medalist(s)
Basel Fanous	–94 kg	—	Hwang M-s (KOR); L 0–3	did not advance					
Zaid Granduke	–94 kg	—	N Çaryýew (TKM); DSQ	M Jalilvand (IRI); W 100^{SUB}–0	R Kussainov (KAZ); W 100^{SUB}–0	I Juraev (UZB); W 0^{PNT}–0	—	F Al-Ketbi (UAE); L 0^{RDC}–0	2nd place, silver medalist(s)

Women

Athlete	Event	Round of 32	Round of 16	Quarterfinals	Semifinals	Repechage	Final / BM	Rank
Athlete	Event	Opposition Result	Opposition Result	Opposition Result	Opposition Result	Opposition Result	Opposition Result	Rank
Yasmeen Al-Khatib	–49 kg	M Ochoa (PHI); L 0–0^{ADV}	did not advance					
Yara Kakish	–62 kg	IY Megawati (INA); W 100^{SUB}–0	G Duvanova (KAZ); W 0^{ADV}–0	Sung K-r (KOR); L 0–2	Did not advance	H Al-Shams (UAE); W 100^{SUB}–0	W Krowýakowa (TKM); W 0^{ADV}–0	3rd place, bronze medalist(s)

== Judo ==
One judoka competed at the Games.

Key:

- 1st number — Ippon
- 2nd number — Waza-ari
- s — Shido

Men

Athlete	Event	Round of 32	Round of 16	Quarterfinals	Semifinals	Repechage	Final / BM	Rank
Athlete	Event	Opposition Result	Opposition Result	Opposition Result	Opposition Result	Opposition Result	Opposition Result	Rank
Younis Eyal Salman	–73 kg	K Nakano (PHI); L 00s1–01s2	did not advance					

== Karate ==
Jordan entered the karate competition with 6 athletes (4 men's and 2 women's). The team includes by two Asian Champions and the former Asian Games silver medalists Abdelrahman Al-Masatfa and Bashar Al-Najjar.

== Swimming ==
Men

Athlete	Event	Heats		Final	
Athlete	Event	Time	Rank	Time	Rank
Amro Al-Wir	50 m breaststroke	29.58	22	did not advance	
Amro Al-Wir	100 m breaststroke	1:03.32	17	did not advance	
Amro Al-Wir	200 m breaststroke	2:16.15	8 Q	2:17.43	8
Khader Baqlah	100 m freestyle	49.30	1 Q	49.10	5
Khader Baqlah	200 m freestyle	1:47.60	2 Q	1:46.77	4
Khader Baqlah	400 m freestyle	3:54.27	7 Q	3:52.77	7
Mohammed Bedour	50 m freestyle	23.83	28	did not advance	
Mohammed Bedour	100 m freestyle	51.62	29	did not advance	
Mohammed Bedour	50 m backstroke	27.40	26	did not advance	

== Taekwondo ==
Kyorugi

Athlete	Event	Round of 32	Round of 16	Quarterfinal	Semifinal	Final	
Athlete	Event	Opposition Score	Opposition Score	Opposition Score	Opposition Score	Opposition Score	Rank
Zaid Mustafa	Men's −58 kg	Y Yskak (KAZ); L 6–17	did not advance				
Ahmad Abu-Ghaush	Men's −68 kg	Bye	Lý HP (VIE); W 27–16	A Natsagdorj (MGL); W 15–12	AM Bakhshi (IRI); L 8–10	Did not advance	3rd place, bronze medalist(s)
Saleh El-Sharabaty	Men's −80 kg	Bye	H Ebata (JPN); W 28–8	Chen LL (CHN); W 13–8	N Rafalovich (UZB); L 2–4	Did not advance	3rd place, bronze medalist(s)
Hamza Kattan	Men's +80 kg	—	Tan YM (MAS)	Yang T-y (TPE); W 24–12	D Shokin (UZB); L 4–5	Did not advance	3rd place, bronze medalist(s)
Rama Abu-Al-Rub	Women's −57 kg	Bye	Lin Y-c (TPE); L 2–2	did not advance			
Julyana Al-Sadeq	Women's −67 kg	—	N Jahinge (SRI); W 38–0	M Mirhosseini (IRI); W 21–5	Zhang MY (CHN); W 14–5	Kim J-d (KOR); W 5–1	1st place, gold medalist(s)
