= Ju-jitsu at the 2018 Asian Games – Men's 69 kg =

Men's jiu-jitsu 69 kg at the 2018 Asian Games
- Venue: Jakarta Convention Center
- Dates: 24 August 2018
- Competitors: 29 from 20 nations

Medalists
gold medal	Torokan Bagynbai Uulu	Kyrgyzstan
silver medal	Talib Al-Kirbi	United Arab Emirates
bronze medal	Banpot Lertthaisong	Thailand
bronze medal	Nartay Kazhekov	Kazakhstan

The men's jiu-jitsu (ne-waza) 69 kilograms Ju-jitsu competition at the 2018 Asian Games in Jakarta was held on 24 August 2018 at the Jakarta Convention Center Assembly Hall. Ju-jitsu made its debut at the 2018 Asian Games. Earlier, it was incorporated into the 2017 Asian Indoor and Martial Arts Games.

== Schedule ==
All times are Western Indonesia Time (UTC+07:00)

Date	Time	Event
Friday, 24 August 2018	10:00	1/16 finals
Friday, 24 August 2018	10:00	1/8 finals
Friday, 24 August 2018	10:00	1/4 finals
Friday, 24 August 2018	10:00	Final of repechage
Friday, 24 August 2018	10:00	Final of tables
Friday, 24 August 2018	16:00	Finals

== Results ==
Legend

- DQ — Won by disqualification
- SU — Won by submission (100–0)

=== Main bracket ===
==== Final ====
Final
Talib Al-Kirbi (UAE)	0
Torokan Bagynbai Uulu (KGZ)	2

==== Top half ====
1/16 finals
Julius Saputera (INA)	2
Ratcharat Yimprai (THA)	0
Ghaleb Al-Harahsheh (JOR)	4
Naser Al-Faraj (KUW)	4
Nartay Kazhekov (KAZ)	0^{SU}
Mönkhtöriin Batbileg (MGL)	0
Khomidjon Muminov (UZB)	5
Maitham Sabba (BRN)	2
Zhakshylyk Uranov (KGZ)	2
Arslan Setdarow (TKM)	0
Abdulelah Mones (YEM)	DQ
Muhammed Yousuf Nabi (PAK)
Mahdi Wakili (AFG)	0
Abdulmalik Al-Murdhi (KSA)	0^{SU}

1/8 finals
Julius Saputera (INA)	0
Ghaleb Al-Harahsheh (JOR)	10
Nartay Kazhekov (KAZ)	2
Khomidjon Muminov (UZB)	0
Zhakshylyk Uranov (KGZ)	0^{SU}
Abdulelah Mones (YEM)	0
Abdulmalik Al-Murdhi (KSA)	0
Talib Al-Kirbi (UAE)	0

1/4 finals
Ghaleb Al-Harahsheh (JOR)	0
Nartay Kazhekov (KAZ)	0
Zhakshylyk Uranov (KGZ)	0
Talib Al-Kirbi (UAE)	2

Final of tables
Nartay Kazhekov (KAZ)	0
Talib Al-Kirbi (UAE)	0

==== Bottom half ====
1/16 finals
Humaid Al-Kaabi (UAE)	0
Vivaddhana Khaou (CAM)	0^{SU}
Jelilmuhammet Hojamyradow (TKM)	2
Fransino Tirta (INA)	0
Mansur Khabibulla (KAZ)	2
Mönkhtöriin Davaadorj (MGL)	0
Torokan Bagynbai Uulu (KGZ)	0
Amir Hossein Khademian (IRI)	0
Ali Ahmed (IRQ)	2
Abdallah Nabas (JOR)	2
Banpot Lertthaisong (THA)	0
Marc Lim (PHI)	0

1/8 finals
Vivaddhana Khaou (CAM)	0
Jelilmuhammet Hojamyradow (TKM)	4
Mansur Khabibulla (KAZ)	0
Torokan Bagynbai Uulu (KGZ)	0
Asadullo Bozorov (UZB)	0
Ali Ahmed (IRQ)	2
Banpot Lertthaisong (THA)	0
Ivan Chua (SGP)	0

1/4 finals
Jelilmuhammet Hojamyradow (TKM)	0
Torokan Bagynbai Uulu (KGZ)	2
Ali Ahmed (IRQ)	0
Banpot Lertthaisong (THA)	0

Final of tables
Torokan Bagynbai Uulu (KGZ)	4
Banpot Lertthaisong (THA)	2

=== Repechage ===
Final of repechage
Ghaleb Al-Harahsheh (JOR)	0
Zhakshylyk Uranov (KGZ)	0^{SU}
Jelilmuhammet Hojamyradow (TKM)	2
Ali Ahmed (IRQ)	0

Bronze medals
Zhakshylyk Uranov (KGZ)	0
Banpot Lertthaisong (THA)	5
Jelilmuhammet Hojamyradow (TKM)	0
Nartay Kazhekov (KAZ)	0
