= Ju-jitsu at the 2018 Asian Games – Men's 85 kg =

2018 Asian Games event

Men's jiu-jitsu 85 kg at the 2018 Asian Games
- Venue: Jakarta Convention Center
- Dates: 26 August 2018
- Competitors: 23 from 16 nations

Medalists
gold medal	Haidar Al-Rasheed	Jordan
silver medal	Khalfan Balhol	United Arab Emirates
bronze medal	Abdurahmanhaji Murtazaliev	Kyrgyzstan
bronze medal	Murtazali Murtazaliev	Kyrgyzstan

The men's jiu-jitsu (ne-waza) 85 kilograms Ju-jitsu competition at the 2018 Asian Games in Jakarta was held on 26 August 2018 at the Jakarta Convention Center Assembly Hall. Ju-jitsu made its debut at the 2018 Asian Games. Earlier, it was incorporated into the 2017 Asian Indoor and Martial Arts Games.

== Schedule ==
All times are Western Indonesia Time (UTC+07:00)

Date	Time	Event
Sunday, 26 August 2018	10:00	1/16 finals
Sunday, 26 August 2018	10:00	1/8 finals
Sunday, 26 August 2018	10:00	1/4 finals
Sunday, 26 August 2018	10:00	Final of repechage
Sunday, 26 August 2018	10:00	Final of tables
Sunday, 26 August 2018	16:00	Finals

== Results ==
Legend

- SU — Won by submission (100–0)
- WO — Won by walkover

=== Main bracket ===
==== Final ====
Final
Khalfan Balhol (UAE)
Haidar Al-Rasheed (JOR)	WO

==== Top half ====
1/16 finals
Khürelbaataryn Möngönbayar (MGL)	0
Murtazali Murtazaliev (KGZ)	15
Andy Sukandar (INA)	0
Mohsen Hamidi (IRI)	0
Abdughafur Abdulloev (TJK)	0^{SU}
Zeyad Mater (YEM)	0
Jawad Andishmand (AFG)	2
Ahmed Saud (KSA)	2

1/8 finals
Murtazali Murtazaliev (KGZ)	0
Mohsen Hamidi (IRI)	0
Bader Al-Kuzai (JOR)	0
Andrey Gavriluk (KAZ)	0
Abdughafur Abdulloev (TJK)	8^{SU}
Ng Wee Kok (SGP)	0
Ahmed Saud (KSA)	0
Khalfan Balhol (UAE)	0^{SU}

1/4 finals
Murtazali Murtazaliev (KGZ)	0
Andrey Gavriluk (KAZ)	0
Abdughafur Abdulloev (TJK)	0
Khalfan Balhol (UAE)	11

Final of tables
Murtazali Murtazaliev (KGZ)	0
Khalfan Balhol (UAE)	2

==== Bottom half ====
1/16 finals
Tömöriin Nemekhbayar (MGL)	0
Habib Ranjbar (IRI)	0
Usman Tsutsoev (KAZ)	0
Mergen Joraýew (TKM)	4
Abdurahmanhaji Murtazaliev (KGZ)	2
Wei Chu-cheng (TPE)	2

1/8 finals
Haidar Al-Rasheed (JOR)	10
Habib Ranjbar (IRI)	0
Mergen Joraýew (TKM)	5^{SU}
Karun Sangsin (THA)	0
Mohamed Haitham Radhi (UAE)	0
Qais Maraaba (PLE)	2
Abdurahmanhaji Murtazaliev (KGZ)	2
Rudi Gunawan (INA)	0

1/4 finals
Haidar Al-Rasheed (JOR)	4
Mergen Joraýew (TKM)	0
Qais Maraaba (PLE)	0
Abdurahmanhaji Murtazaliev (KGZ)	0^{SU}

Final of tables
Haidar Al-Rasheed (JOR)	0
Abdurahmanhaji Murtazaliev (KGZ)	0

=== Repechage ===
Final of repechage
Andrey Gavriluk (KAZ)	17
Abdughafur Abdulloev (TJK)	0
Mergen Joraýew (TKM)	0^{SU}
Qais Maraaba (PLE)	0

Bronze medals
Andrey Gavriluk (KAZ)	0
Abdurahmanhaji Murtazaliev (KGZ)	0
Mergen Joraýew (TKM)	0
Murtazali Murtazaliev (KGZ)	0
