= Ju-jitsu at the 2018 Asian Games – Men's 94 kg =

Men's jiu-jitsu 94 kg at the 2018 Asian Games
- Venue: Jakarta Convention Center
- Dates: 25 August 2018
- Competitors: 21 from 16 nations

Medalists
gold medal	Faisal Al-Ketbi	United Arab Emirates
silver medal	Zaid Granduke	Jordan
bronze medal	Rizat Makhashev	Kazakhstan
bronze medal	Hwang Myeng-se	South Korea

The men's jiu-jitsu (ne-waza) 94 kilograms Ju-jitsu competition at the 2018 Asian Games in Jakarta was held on 25 August 2018 at the Jakarta Convention Center Assembly Hall. Ju-jitsu made its debut at the 2018 Asian Games. Earlier, it was incorporated into the 2017 Asian Indoor and Martial Arts Games.

== Schedule ==
All times are Western Indonesia Time (UTC+07:00)

Date	Time	Event
Saturday, 25 August 2018	10:00	1/16 finals
Saturday, 25 August 2018	10:00	1/8 finals
Saturday, 25 August 2018	10:00	1/4 finals
Saturday, 25 August 2018	10:00	Final of repechage
Saturday, 25 August 2018	10:00	Final of tables
Saturday, 25 August 2018	16:00	Finals

== Results ==
Legend

- DQ — Won by disqualification
- SU — Won by submission (100–0)

=== Main bracket ===
==== Final ====
Final
Faisal Al-Ketbi (UAE)	0
Zaid Granduke (JOR)	0

==== Top half ====
1/16 finals
Lin Chang-chih (TPE)	0
Mohamed Ghareeb (BRN)	0
Hwang Myeng-se (KOR)	3
Basel Fanous (JOR)	0

1/8 finals
Faisal Al-Ketbi (UAE)	3
Mohamed Ghareeb (BRN)	0
Muhammad Ariq Noor (INA)	DQ
Mohammad Ali (KUW)
Rizat Makhashev (KAZ)	9^{SU}
Natdanai Netthip (THA)	0
Baasandorjiin Ariuntsog (MGL)	0
Hwang Myeng-se (KOR)	0^{SU}

1/4 finals
Faisal Al-Ketbi (UAE)	10^{SU}
Muhammad Ariq Noor (INA)	0
Rizat Makhashev (KAZ)	0
Hwang Myeng-se (KOR)	9

Final of tables
Faisal Al-Ketbi (UAE)	0
Hwang Myeng-se (KOR)	0

==== Bottom half ====
1/16 finals
Nejimetdin Çaryýew (TKM)
Zaid Granduke (JOR)	DQ
Khürelbaataryn Möngönbayar (MGL)
Masoud Jalilvand (IRI)	DQ
Ruslan Sagdeev (KGZ)	0
Ramazan Kussainov (KAZ)	0

1/8 finals
Zaid Granduke (JOR)	0^{SU}
Masoud Jalilvand (IRI)	0
Ramazan Kussainov (KAZ)	0^{SU}
Herman Tri Saputra (INA)	0
Ilkhom Juraev (UZB)	DQ
Mohammad Hasan (PLE)
Abdulsabor Rahimi (AFG)	0
Emad Al-Sumaid (KUW)	4

1/4 finals
Zaid Granduke (JOR)	6^{SU}
Ramazan Kussainov (KAZ)	0
Ilkhom Juraev (UZB)	3
Emad Al-Sumaid (KUW)	0

Final of tables
Zaid Granduke (JOR)	0
Ilkhom Juraev (UZB)	0

=== Repechage ===
Final of repechage
Muhammad Ariq Noor (INA)	0
Rizat Makhashev (KAZ)	5^{SU}
Ramazan Kussainov (KAZ)	7
Emad Al-Sumaid (KUW)	2

Bronze medals
Rizat Makhashev (KAZ)	4
Ilkhom Juraev (UZB)	4
Ramazan Kussainov (KAZ)	0
Hwang Myeng-se (KOR)	6^{SU}
