= Ju-jitsu at the 2018 Asian Games – Men's 62 kg =

Men's jiu-jitsu 62 kg at the 2018 Asian Games
- Venue: Jakarta Convention Center
- Dates: 25 August 2018
- Competitors: 27 from 17 nations

Medalists
gold medal	Darkhan Nortayev	Kazakhstan
silver medal	Omar Al-Fadhli	United Arab Emirates
bronze medal	Said Al-Mazrouei	United Arab Emirates
bronze medal	Freeh Al-Harahsheh	Jordan

The men's jiu-jitsu (ne-waza) 62 kilograms Ju-jitsu competition at the 2018 Asian Games in Jakarta was held on 25 August 2018 at the Jakarta Convention Center Assembly Hall. Ju-jitsu made its debut at the 2018 Asian Games. Earlier, it was incorporated into the 2017 Asian Indoor and Martial Arts Games.

== Schedule ==
All times are Western Indonesia Time (UTC+07:00)

Date	Time	Event
Saturday, 25 August 2018	10:00	1/16 finals
Saturday, 25 August 2018	10:00	1/8 finals
Saturday, 25 August 2018	10:00	1/4 finals
Saturday, 25 August 2018	10:00	Final of repechage
Saturday, 25 August 2018	10:00	Final of tables
Saturday, 25 August 2018	16:00	Finals

== Results ==
Legend

- DQ — Won by disqualification
- SU — Won by submission (100–0)

=== Main bracket ===
==== Final ====
Final
Omar Al-Fadhli (UAE)	0
Darkhan Nortayev (KAZ)	0

==== Top half ====
1/16 finals
Hussain Bakhsh Safari (AFG)	4
Narangereliin Khas-Erdene (MGL)	0
Daniel Hilal (LBN)	15
Imam Mastur (INA)	0
Daryl Chia (SGP)	0
Abubakir Zhanibek (KAZ)	3
Woraman Jangsawang (THA)	0
Alymgeldi Abdizhamil Uulu (KGZ)	7
Ýusup Taňryberdiýew (TKM)	0
Shoymard Abdulnazarov (TJK)	2
Omar Al-Fadhli (UAE)	4
Abdulla Munfaredi (BRN)	2

1/8 finals
Freeh Al-Harahsheh (JOR)	13
Hussain Bakhsh Safari (AFG)	0
Daniel Hilal (LBN)	2
Abubakir Zhanibek (KAZ)	0
Rakhimjon Subkhonov (UZB)	0
Alymgeldi Abdizhamil Uulu (KGZ)	2
Shoymard Abdulnazarov (TJK)	0
Omar Al-Fadhli (UAE)	2

1/4 finals
Freeh Al-Harahsheh (JOR)	2
Daniel Hilal (LBN)	0
Alymgeldi Abdizhamil Uulu (KGZ)	0
Omar Al-Fadhli (UAE)	2

Final of tables
Freeh Al-Harahsheh (JOR)	0
Omar Al-Fadhli (UAE)	2

==== Bottom half ====
1/16 finals
Calvin Chua (SGP)	0
Carlos Angelo Pena (PHI)	10
Darkhan Nortayev (KAZ)	2
Mohamed Abudrees (BRN)	0
Sarin Soonthorn (THA)	DQ
Ali Khousrof (YEM)
Mirali Agaýew (TKM)	0^{SU}
Baataryn Mönkhbaatar (MGL)	0
Ahmad Reza Eidi (IRI)	8
Fikri Ramadhan (INA)	0

1/8 finals
Carlos Angelo Pena (PHI)	0
Darkhan Nortayev (KAZ)	2
Sarin Soonthorn (THA)	0
Abdyldabek Kekenov (KGZ)	2
Mirali Agaýew (TKM)	0^{SU}
Ahmad Reza Eidi (IRI)	0
Jakhongir Mirakhmedov (UZB)	0
Said Al-Mazrouei (UAE)	6^{SU}

1/4 finals
Darkhan Nortayev (KAZ)	2
Abdyldabek Kekenov (KGZ)	0
Mirali Agaýew (TKM)	0
Said Al-Mazrouei (UAE)	5

Final of tables
Darkhan Nortayev (KAZ)	4
Said Al-Mazrouei (UAE)	0

=== Repechage ===
Final of repechage
Daniel Hilal (LBN)	8^{SU}
Alymgeldi Abdizhamil Uulu (KGZ)	0
Abdyldabek Kekenov (KGZ)	0
Mirali Agaýew (TKM)	0

Bronze medals
Daniel Hilal (LBN)	0
Said Al-Mazrouei (UAE)	2
Mirali Agaýew (TKM)	0
Freeh Al-Harahsheh (JOR)	5
