= Mahra Al-Hinaai =

Emirati ju-jitsu practitioner

Personal information
- Nationality: Emirati
- Born: 23 August 2001 (age 24)

Sport
- Country: United Arab Emirates
- Sport: Ju-jitsu
- Event: ne-waza
Medal record
Representing United Arab Emirates
Women's Ju-jitsu
Asian Games
Silver medal – second place	2018 Jakarta	ne-waza 49kg

Mahra Al-Hinaai (born 23 August 2001) is an Emirati female ju-jitsu practitioner. She represented United Arab Emirates at the 2018 Asian Games and settled for a silver medal in the women's 49kg ne-waza event after losing to fellow teenager Jessa Khan of Cambodia.
