= Tsogkhüügiin Udval =

Mongolian female ju-jitsu practitioner (born 1994)

Tsogkhuugiin Udval
Personal information
- Nationality: Mongolian
- Born: 18 August 1994 (age 31)
- Height: 155 cm (5 ft 1 in)
- Weight: 62 kg (137 lb)

Sport
- Country: Mongolia
- Sport: Ju-jitsu
- Event: ne-waza
Medal record
Representing Mongolia
Women's Ju-jitsu
Asian Games
Bronze medal – third place	2018 Jakarta	ne-waza 62kg

Tsogkhuugiin Udval (Mongolian: Цогхүүгийн Удвал; born 18 August 1994) is a Mongolian female ju-jitsu practitioner.

She represented Mongolia at the 2018 Asian Games and claimed a bronze medal in the women's 62kg ne-waza event.
