= Dương Thị Thanh Minh =

Vietnamese martial artist (born 1992)

Personal information
- Nationality: Vietnamese
- Born: 4 May 1992 (age 34) Thu Thien Hue, Vietnam
- Height: 165 cm (5 ft 5 in)
- Weight: 50 kg (110 lb)

Sport
- Country: Vietnam
- Sport: Ju-jitsu, Judo
- Event: ne-waza
Medal record
Representing Vietnam
Women's Ju-jitsu
Asian Ju-jitsu Championships
Silver medal – second place	2017	49kg
Asian Games
Bronze medal – third place	2018 Jakarta	ne-waza 62kg
Asian Indoor and Martial Arts Games
Bronze medal – third place	2017 Hanoi	ne-waza 49kg
Women's judo
Southeast Asian Games
Bronze medal – third place	2011 Jakarta	52kg

Dương Thị Thanh Minh (born 4 May 1992) is a Vietnamese female ju-jitsu practitioner who also formerly competed as a judoka in international competitive events.

She represented Vietnam at the 2018 Asian Games as a ju-jitsu practitioner and claimed a bronze medal in the women's 62kg ne-waza event.
