= Kemal Meredow =

Turkmen ju-jitsu practitioner

Personal information
- Nationality: Turkmen
- Born: 2 February 1994 (age 32)
- Height: 168 cm (5 ft 6 in)
- Weight: 60 kg (132 lb)

Sport
- Country: Turkmenistan
- Sport: ju-jitsu
Medal record
Representing Turkmenistan
Men's ju-jitsu
Asian Games
| Bronze medal – third place | 2018 Jakarta | ne-waza 56kg |

Kemal Meredow (born 2 February 1994) is a Turkmen male ju-jitsu practitioner. He represented Turkmenistan at the 2018 Asian Games and claimed a bronze medal in the men's ne-waza 56kg event.
