= Yara Kakish =

Jordanian ju-jitsu practitioner

Personal information
- Nationality: Jordanian
- Born: 21 August 1991 (age 34) Amman, Jordan
- Height: 167 cm (5 ft 6 in)
- Weight: 62 kg (137 lb)

Sport
- Country: Jordan
- Sport: Ju-jitsu
- Event: ne-waza
Medal record
Representing Jordan
Women's Ju-jitsu
Asian Games
Bronze medal – third place	2018 Jakarta	ne-waza 62kg

Yara Kakish (born 21 August 1991) is a Jordanian female ju-jitsu practitioner. Her husband Basel Fanous is also a ju-jitsu practitioner and has represented Jordan in international competitive events.

== Grappling career ==
She represented Jordan at the 2018 Asian Games and claimed a bronze medal in the women's 62kg ne-waza event.

Kakish competed against Emily Ferreira in a grappling match at ADXC 2 on January 19, 2024. She lost the match by submission in the third round.
