= Constance Lien =

Singaporean ju-jitsu practitioner

Personal information
- Full name: Tian En Constance Lien
- Nationality: Singaporean
- Born: 24 June 1999 (age 26) Singapore
- Height: 161 cm (5 ft 3 in)
- Weight: 58 kg (128 lb)

Sport
- Country: Singapore
- Sport: Ju-jitsu
- Event: ne-waza
Medal record
Event	1st	2nd	3rd
Asian Games	0	1	0
Southeast Asian Games	1	0	0
Total	1	1	0
Representing Singapore
Women's Ju-jitsu
Asian Games
Silver medal – second place	2018 Jakarta	ne-waza 62kg
Southeast Asian Games
Gold medal – first place	2019 Philippines	Women's U 62 kg

Tian En Constance Lien (born 24 June 1999) is a Singaporean female ju-jitsu practitioner who also formerly trained the sport of swimming. Her sister Charity Lien is a swimmer who has represented Singapore in swimming meets and her mother Yuen Shuang Ching was also a national swimmer.

She represented Singapore at the 2018 Asian Games and won a silver medal in the women's 62kg ne-waza event. She was the only medalist for Singapore in ju-jitsu at the 2018 Asian Games as she was the first Singaporean ever to win an international medal in the sport of ju-jitsu.

Lien also won a gold medal in the women's 62kg ne-waza event at the 2019 Southeast Asian Games.
