= Paragliding at the 2018 Asian Games =

- Venue: Gunung Mas
- Dates: 20–29 August 2018
- Competitors: 98 from 18 nations

Paragliding at the 2018 Asian Games was held at the Gunung Mas, West Java, Indonesia. It was held from 20 to 29 August 2018.

== Schedule ==
●	Round	●	Last round

Event↓/Date →	20th Mon	21st Tue	22nd Wed	23rd Thu	24th Fri	25th Sat	26th Sun	27th Mon	28th Tue	29th Wed
Men's individual accuracy	●●	●●●	●●●●	●						
Men's team accuracy	●●	●●●	●							
Men's team cross-country						●	●	●	●	●
Women's individual accuracy	●●	●●●	●●●●	●						
Women's team accuracy	●●	●●●	●							
Women's team cross-country						●	●	●	●	●

== Medalists ==
=== Men ===
Event	Gold	Silver	Bronze
Individual accuracy	Jafro Megawanto; Indonesia	Jirasak Witeetham; Thailand	Lee Chul-soo; South Korea
Team accuracy	Indonesia; Aris Apriansyah; Joni Efendi; Jafro Megawanto; Hening Paradigma; Roni Pratama	South Korea; Kim Jin-oh; Lee Chang-min; Lee Chul-soo; Lee Seong-min; Lim Moon-seob	Thailand; Sarayut Chinpongsatorn; Tanapat Luangiam; Mongkut Preecha; Jirasak Witeetham; Nithat Yangjui
Team cross-country	Japan; Yoshiaki Hirokawa; Takuo Iwasaki; Taro Kamiyama; Yoshiki Kuremoto; Yoshiaki Nakagawa	Nepal; Bimal Adhikari; Bijay Gautam; Sushil Gurung; Yukesh Gurung; Bishal Thapa	Indonesia; Aris Apriansyah; Joni Efendi; Jafro Megawanto; Hening Paradigma; Roni Pratama

=== Women ===
Event	Gold	Silver	Bronze
Individual accuracy	Nunnapat Phuchong; Thailand	Lee Da-gyeom; South Korea	Rika Wijayanti; Indonesia
Team accuracy	Thailand; Chantika Chaisanuk; Nunnapat Phuchong; Narubhorn Wathaya	Indonesia; Lis Andriana; Rika Wijayanti; Ike Ayu Wulandari	South Korea; Baek Jin-hee; Jang Woo-young; Lee Da-gyeom
Team cross-country	South Korea; Baek Jin-hee; Jang Woo-young; Lee Da-gyeom	Japan; Keiko Hiraki; Nao Mochizuki; Atsuko Yamashita	Indonesia; Lis Andriana; Rika Wijayanti; Ike Ayu Wulandari

== Medal table ==
Rank	Nation	Gold	Silver	Bronze	Total
1	Indonesia (INA)	2	1	3	6
2	Thailand (THA)	2	1	1	4
3	South Korea (KOR)	1	2	2	5
4	Japan (JPN)	1	1	0	2
5	Nepal (NEP)	0	1	0	1
Totals (5 entries)		6	6	6	18

== Participating nations ==
A total of 98 athletes from 18 nations competed in paragliding at the 2018 Asian Games:

- Afghanistan (4)
- China (8)
- Chinese Taipei (5)
- Hong Kong (6)
- Indonesia (8)
- Iran (3)
- Japan (8)
- Kuwait (5)
- Laos (5)
- Malaysia (8)
- Mongolia (5)
- Nepal (8)
- Pakistan (1)
- Qatar (2)
- Saudi Arabia (5)
- Singapore (1)
- South Korea (8)
- Thailand (8)
