= Nepal Weightlifting Association =

Governing body for weightlifting in Nepal

- Official Logo of the NWA
- Sport: Weightlifting
- Jurisdiction: (Nepal) National
- Abbreviation: NWA
- Founded: 1979; 47 years ago
- Affiliation: International Weightlifting Federation
- Regional affiliation: Asian Weightlifting Federation
- Headquarters: Kathmandu, Nepal
- President: Ram Krishna Shrestha
- Secretary: Tilak Bahadur Raut

Official website
- iwlf.in
- (Nepal)

The Nepal Weightlifting Association (NWA) is the national governing body to develop and promote the sport of Weightlifting in the Nepal.

NWA Nepal yearly organized National weightlifting Championships.

Nepal ranked in Category C member federation under IWF.

== National events ==
- School
- Youth
- Junior
- Senior

== See also ==
- List of Nepalese records in Olympic weightlifting
- Kamal Bahadur Adhikari
