= Nepal at the 2018 Asian Games =

- IOC code: NEP
- NOC: Nepal Olympic Committee
- Website: www.nocnepal.org.np

in Jakarta and Palembang August 18 – September 2
- Competitors: 186 in 29 sports
- Flag bearer: Kamal Bahadur Adhikari
- Medals Ranked 33rd: Gold 0 Silver 1 Bronze 0 Total 1

Asian Games appearances (overview)
- 1951; 1954; 1958; 1962; 1966; 1970; 1974; 1978; 1982; 1986; 1990; 1994; 1998; 2002; 2006; 2010; 2014; 2018; 2022; 2026

Nepal competed at the 2018 Asian Games in Jakarta and Palembang, Indonesia, from 18 August to 2 September 2018.

== Medalists ==
The following Nepal competitors won medals at the Games.

| Medal | Name | Sport | Event | Date |
|---|---|---|---|---|
| Silver | Bimal Adhikari; Bijay Gautam; Sushil Gurung; Yukesh Chaudhary; Bishal Thapa | Paragliding | Men's team cross-country | 29 August |

== Competitors ==
The following is a list of the number of competitors representing Nepal that will participate at the Games:

| Sport | Men | Women | Total |
|---|---|---|---|
| Archery | 4 | 1 | 5 |
| Athletics | 4 | 2 | 6 |
| Badminton | 4 | 4 | 8 |
| Basketball 3X3 | 4 | 4 | 8 |
| Boxing | 5 | 3 | 8 |
| Cycling | 2 | 1 | 3 |
| Fencing | 4 | 4 | 8 |
| Football | 21 | 0 | 21 |
| Golf | 4 | 0 | 4 |
| Judo | 4 | 4 | 8 |
| Kabaddi | 12 | 0 | 12 |
| Karate | 4 | 4 | 8 |
| Kurash | 1 | 1 | 2 |
| Paragliding | 5 | 3 | 8 |
| Pencak silat | 1 | 0 | 1 |
| Sepak takraw | 5 | 0 | 5 |
| Shooting | 1 | 2 | 3 |
| Roller sports | 1 | 0 | 1 |
| Sport climbing | 2 | 0 | 2 |
| Squash | 4 | 0 | 4 |
| Swimming | 2 | 2 | 4 |
| Table tennis | 3 | 3 | 6 |
| Taekwondo | 6 | 8 | 14 |
| Tennis | 3 | 3 | 6 |
| Triathlon | 2 | 2 | 4 |
| Volleyball | 12 | 0 | 12 |
| Weightlifting | 2 | 2 | 4 |
| Wrestling | 3 | 0 | 3 |
| Wushu | 6 | 4 | 10 |
| Total | 131 | 57 | 188 |

== Archery ==
Recurve

| Athlete | Event | Ranking round | | Round of 64 | Round of 32 | Round of 16 | Quarterfinals | Semifinals | Final / BM | |
| Athlete | Event | Score | Seed | Opposition Score | Opposition Score | Opposition Score | Opposition Score | Opposition Score | Opposition Score | Rank |
|---|---|---|---|---|---|---|---|---|---|---|
| Ashim Sherchan | Men's individual | 608 | 68 | did not advance | | | | | | |
| Min Prasad Gauchan | Men's individual | 597 | 71 | did not advance | | | | | | |
| Roshan Nagarkoti | Men's individual | 637 | 25 | Bye | Da Silva (SRI); L 0–6 | did not advance | | | | |
| Tilak Pun Magar | Men's individual | 641 | 24 | Wangdi (BHU); W 6–0 | Xu (CHN); L 4–6 | did not advance | | | | |
| Ashim Sherchan; Roshan Nagarkoti; Tilak Pun Magar | Men's team | 1886 | 14 | —N/a | Qatar; W 6–0 | Chinese Taipei; L 0–6 | did not advance | | | |
| Gyanu Awale | Women's individual | 586 | 36 | Lam (HKG); L 2–6 | did not advance | | | | | |
| Tilak Pun Magar; Gyanu Awale | Mixed team | 1227 | 17 | —N/a | Kyrgyzstan; L 4–5 | did not advance | | | | |

== Athletics ==
Nepal put-up six athletes (4 men's and 2 women's) to participate in the athletics competition at the Games.

== Badminton ==
Nepal entered the Games with 8 badminton players (4 men's and 4 women's). The men's team made an history by advance to the quarter-finals after beat Pakistan 3–1.

Men

| Athlete | Event | Round of 64 | Round of 32 | Round of 16 | Quarterfinals | Semifinals | Final | |
| Athlete | Event | Opposition Score | Opposition Score | Opposition Score | Opposition Score | Opposition Score | Opposition Score | Rank |
|---|---|---|---|---|---|---|---|---|
| Ratnajit Tamang | Singles | Bye | Son W-h (KOR); L (8–21, 9–21) | did not advance | | | | |
| Bikash Shrestha | Singles | Bye | K Momota (JPN); L (9–21, 10–21) | did not advance | | | | |
| Dipesh Dhami; Ratnajit Tamang | Doubles | —N/a | R Azam / S K Ali (PAK); L (19–21, 20–22) | did not advance | | | | |
| Bikash Shrestha; Nabin Shrestha | Doubles | —N/a | S Enkhbat / T Gombodorj (MGL); W (21–12, 21–7) | Goh V S / Tan W K (MAS); L (9–21, 12–21) | did not advance | | | |
| Bikash Shrestha; Dipesh Dhami; Nabin Shrestha; Ratnajit Tamang | Team | —N/a | | Pakistan; W 3–1 | Chinese Taipei; L 0–3 | Did not advance | | |

Women

| Athlete | Event | Round of 32 | Round of 16 | Quarterfinals | Semifinals | Final | |
| Athlete | Event | Opposition Score | Opposition Score | Opposition Score | Opposition Score | Opposition Score | Rank |
|---|---|---|---|---|---|---|---|
| Nangsal Tamang | Singles | F N Abdul Razzaq (MDV); W (21–19, 21–15) | A Yamaguchi (JPN); L (7–21, 12–21) | did not advance | | | |
| Jessica Gurung | Singles | R Intanon (THA); L (7–21, 4–21) | did not advance | | | | |
| Jessica Gurung; Nangsal Tamang | Doubles | J Kititharakul / R Prajongjai (THA); L (7–21, 5–21) | did not advance | | | | |
| Amita Giri; Rasila Maharjan | Doubles | Bye | Kim H-r / Kong H-y (KOR); L (7–21, 1–21) | did not advance | | | |
| Amita Giri; Jessica Gurung; Nangsal Tamang; Rasila Maharjan | Team | —N/a | Maldives; L 2–3 | Did not advance | | | |

Mixed

| Athlete | Event | Round of 32 | Round of 16 | Quarterfinals | Semifinals | Final | |
| Athlete | Event | Opposition Score | Opposition Score | Opposition Score | Opposition Score | Opposition Score | Rank |
|---|---|---|---|---|---|---|---|
| Ratnajit Tamang; Nangsal Tamang | Mixed | R Karanda Suwardi / D Susanto (INA); L (13–21, 7–21) | did not advance | | | | |
| Dipesh Dhami; Jessica Gurung | Mixed | Lee C H / Chau H W (HKG); L (11–21, 11–21) | did not advance | | | | |

== Basketball ==
Summary

| Team | Event | Group stage | | | | | | Quarterfinal | Semifinals / Pl. | Final / BM / Pl. | |
| Team | Event | Opposition Score | Opposition Score | Opposition Score | Opposition Score | Opposition Score | Rank | Opposition Score | Opposition Score | Opposition Score | Rank |
|---|---|---|---|---|---|---|---|---|---|---|---|
| Nepal men's | Men's 3x3 tournament | Japan; L 11−21 | Qatar; L 8−21 | Maldives; W Disq. | Syria; L 19−21 | Jordan; W 21−10 | 4 | did not advance | | | |
| Nepal women's | Women's 3x3 tournament | —N/a | | Chinese Taipei; L 8−19 | Mongolia; L 11−21 | Japan; L 4−21 | 4 | did not advance | | | |

=== 3x3 basketball ===
Nepal national 3x3 team participated in the Games, the men's team placed in the pool C while the women's team in the pool B based on the FIBA 3x3 federation ranking.

==== Men's tournament ====
Roster

The following is the Nepal roster in the men's 3x3 basketball tournament of the 2018 Asian Games.

- Nischal Maharjan (4)
- Mabindra Bhandari (5)
- Ajay Kushwaha (6)
- Aashish Basnet (7)

Pool C

| Pos | Team | Pld | W | L | PF | PA | PD | Qualification |
|---|---|---|---|---|---|---|---|---|
| 1 | Japan | 5 | 5 | 0 | 86 | 46 | +40 | Quarterfinals |
| 2 | Qatar | 5 | 4 | 1 | 74 | 43 | +31 | Quarterfinals |
| 3 | Syria | 5 | 3 | 2 | 62 | 76 | −14 | |
| 4 | Nepal | 5 | 2 | 3 | 59 | 74 | −15 | |
| 5 | Jordan | 5 | 1 | 4 | 43 | 85 | −42 | |
| — | Maldives | 5 | 0 | 5 | 0 | 0 | 0 | |

Source: OCA

21 August
17:10

| Japan | 22–11 | Nepal |
| Pts: Matsuwaki 11 | | Pts: Maharjan, Bhandari 4 |

Gelora Bung Karno Tennis Center Court, Jakarta
Referees: Rulyov (KAZ), Al-Harthi (OMA)

21 August
18:40

| Nepal | 8–21 | Qatar |
| Pts: Maharjan 4 | | Pts: Dieng, Muslić 8 |

Gelora Bung Karno Tennis Center Court, Jakarta
Referees: Quinn (INA), Shi (CHN)

24 August
15:20

| Maldives | vs. | Nepal |
Forfeit

Gelora Bung Karno Tennis Center Court, Jakarta

24 August
15:40

| Syria | 21–19 | Nepal |
| Pts: Khouri 7 | | Pts: Basnet 9 |

Gelora Bung Karno Tennis Center Court, Jakarta
Referees: Liu (MAS), Quinn (INA)

24 August
16:50

| Nepal | 21–10 | Jordan |
| Pts: Basnet 13 | | Pts: Jarrad 4 |

Gelora Bung Karno Tennis Center Court, Jakarta
Referees: Quinn (INA), Liu (MAS)

==== Women's tournament ====
Roster

The following is the Nepal roster in the women's 3x3 basketball tournament of the 2018 Asian Games.

- Anusha Malla (4)
- Alina Gurung (5)
- Bhawana Lama (6)
- Shreya Khadka (7)

Pool B

| Pos | Team | Pld | W | L | PF | PA | PD | Qualification |
|---|---|---|---|---|---|---|---|---|
| 1 | Japan | 3 | 3 | 0 | 57 | 15 | +42 | Quarterfinals |
| 2 | Chinese Taipei | 3 | 2 | 1 | 50 | 32 | +18 | Quarterfinals |
| 3 | Mongolia | 3 | 1 | 2 | 23 | 54 | −31 | |
| 4 | Nepal | 3 | 0 | 3 | 23 | 52 | −29 | |

Source: OCA

22 August
16:50

| Nepal | 8–19 | Chinese Taipei |
| Pts: Malla, Lama 3 | | Pts: Lo 9 |

Gelora Bung Karno Tennis Center Court, Jakarta
Referees: Lim (MAS), Rulyov (KAZ)

25 August
19:40

| Mongolia | 12–11 | Nepal |
| Pts: Tserenlkham, Minjin 5 | | Pts: Khadka 4 |

Gelora Bung Karno Tennis Center Court, Jakarta
Referees: Lim (MAS), Al-Harthi (OMA)

25 August
20:50

| Japan | 21–4 | Nepal |
| Pts: Konno 8 | | Pts: Malla 3 |

Gelora Bung Karno Tennis Center Court, Jakarta
Referees: Al-Harthi (OMA), Ibragimow (TKM)

== Boxing ==
Men

| Athlete | Event | Round of 32 | Round of 16 | Quarterfinals | Semifinals | Final | Rank |
| Athlete | Event | Opposition Result | Opposition Result | Opposition Result | Opposition Result | Opposition Result | Rank |
|---|---|---|---|---|---|---|---|
| Teja Bahadur Deuba | –49 kg | K Khamsathone (LAO); L 1–3 | did not advance | | | | |
| Prem Chaudhary | –52 kg | Bye | R Ladon (PHI); L 0–5 | did not advance | | | |
| Bhupendra Thapa | –64 kg | O Al-Kasbeh (JOR); L 0–4 | did not advance | | | | |
| Bishnu Prasad Ghale Gurung | –69 kg | Bye | T Tharumalingam (QAT); L 0–5 | did not advance | | | |
| Deepak Shrestha | –75 kg | Bye | Kan C-w (TPE); L 0–5 | did not advance | | | |

Women

| Athlete | Event | Round of 32 | Round of 16 | Quarterfinals | Semifinals | Final | Rank |
| Athlete | Event | Opposition Result | Opposition Result | Opposition Result | Opposition Result | Opposition Result | Rank |
|---|---|---|---|---|---|---|---|
| Bimala Shrestha | –51 kg | Bye | O Jargalan (MGL); L 1–4 | did not advance | | | |
| Sangita Sunar | –57 kg | —N/a | N Techasuep (THA); L 0–5 | did not advance | | | |
| Punam Rawal | –60 kg | —N/a | Yang WL (CHN); L 0–5 | did not advance | | | |

== Cycling ==
=== Mountain biking ===
| Athlete | Event | Seeding run | | Final | |
| Athlete | Event | Time | Rank | Time | Rank |
|---|---|---|---|---|---|
| Buddhi Bahadur Tamang | Men's cross-country | —N/a | | −4 laps | 17 |
| Laxmi Magar | Women's cross-country | —N/a | | −2 laps | 10 |
| Rajesh Magar | Men's downhill | 3:12.816 | 8 | 2:28.538 | 7 |

== Fencing ==
Individual

| Athlete | Event | Preliminary | | Round of 32 | Round of 16 | Quarterfinals | Semifinals | Final | |
| Athlete | Event | Opposition Score | Rank | Opposition Score | Opposition Score | Opposition Score | Opposition Score | Opposition Score | Rank |
|---|---|---|---|---|---|---|---|---|---|
| Mahesh Prasad Bhatt | Men's foil | JI Lim (SGP): L 1–5; T Shikine (JPN): L 0–5; C Theara (CAM): L 3–5; Hoàng NH (VIE): L 1–5; Huang MK (CHN): L 1–5 | 6 | did not advance | | | | | 28 |
| Sanjeep Lama | Men's foil | A Owaida (QAT): L 1–5; T Saito (JPN): L 2–5; S Son Y-k (KOR): L 1–5; H Yoong (MAS): L 0–5; M Zulfikar (INA): L 0–5 | 6 | did not advance | | | | | 29 |
| Kamala Shreshta | Women's sabre | N Tamura (JPN): L 0–5; Y Ariunzayaa (MGL): W 5–0; Au SY (HKG): L 0–5; Qian JR (CHN): L 1–5; Bùi TTH (VIE): L 4–5 | 5 | did not advance | | | | | 20 |
| Rabina Thapa | Women's sabre | D Permatasari (INA): L 0–5; S Fukushima (JPN): L 0–5; Yoon J-s (KOR): L 0–5; C Linly (CAM): L 1–5; FR Delcheh (IRI): L 0–5 | 6 | did not advance | | | | | 22 |

Team

| Athlete | Event | Round of 16 | Quarterfinals | Semifinals | Final | |
| Athlete | Event | Opposition Score | Opposition Score | Opposition Score | Opposition Score | Rank |
|---|---|---|---|---|---|---|
| Sher Singh Airy; Mahesh Prasad Bhatt; Rajan Raj Khadka; Sanjeep Lama | Men's foil | Philippines (PHI); L 3–45 | did not advance | | | 10 |
| Meena Devi Poudel; Kamala Shreshta; Rabina Thapa; Asmita Basnet | Women's sabre | Thailand (THA); L 10–45 | did not advance | | | 9 |

== Football ==
Nepal competed in the group D at the men's football event.

Summary

| Team | Event | Group stage | | | | Round of 16 | Quarterfinal | Semifinal | Final / BM | |
| Team | Event | Opposition Score | Opposition Score | Opposition Score | Rank | Opposition Score | Opposition Score | Opposition Score | Opposition Score | Rank |
|---|---|---|---|---|---|---|---|---|---|---|
| Nepal men's | Men's tournament | Japan; L 0–1 | Vietnam; L 0–2 | Pakistan; L 1–2 | 4 | did not advance | | | | 22 |

=== Men's tournament ===
Roster

The following is the Nepal squad in the men's football tournament of the 2018 Asian Games. The team of 20 players was officially named on 24 June.

Head coach: (Japan) Koji Gyotoku

| No. | Pos. | Player | Date of birth (age) | Club |
|---|---|---|---|---|
| 4 | DF | Ananta Tamang | 14 January 1998 (aged 20) | (All Nepal Football Association) Three Star |
| 6 | DF | Aditya Chaudhary | 19 April 1996 (aged 22) | (All Nepal Football Association) Armed Police Force |
| 8 | MF | Bishal Rai* | 6 June 1993 (aged 25) | (All Nepal Football Association) Manang Marshyangdi |
| 9 | FW | Suman Lama | 9 March 1996 (aged 22) | (All Nepal Football Association) Nepal Police |
| 10 | FW | Bimal Gharti Magar | 26 January 1998 (aged 20) | (All Nepal Football Association) Three Star |
| 11 | MF | Heman Gurung | 27 February 1996 (aged 22) | (All Nepal Football Association) Manang Marshyangdi |
| 12 | MF | Tej Tamang | 14 February 1998 (aged 20) | (All Nepal Football Association) Nepal Police |
| 13 | DF | Kamal Shrestha | 10 July 1997 (aged 21) | (All Nepal Football Association) Manang Marshyangdi |
| 14 | FW | Anjan Bista | 15 May 1998 (aged 20) | (All Nepal Football Association) Armed Police Force |
| 16 | GK | Kiran Chemjong* (captain) | 24 March 1990 (aged 28) | (Football Association of Maldives) TC Sports Club |
| 19 | GK | Alan Neupane | 24 June 1996 (aged 22) | (All Nepal Football Association) Three Star |
| 22 | DF | Dinesh Rajbanshi | 4 April 1998 (aged 20) | (All Nepal Football Association) Nepal Police |
| 23 | MF | Sunil Bal | 1 January 1998 (aged 20) | (All Nepal Football Association) Three Star |
| 24 | DF | Tshring Gurung | 21 February 1998 (aged 20) | (All Nepal Football Association) Chyasal Youth |
| 25 | DF | Suman Aryal | 9 March 1996 (aged 22) | (All Nepal Football Association) Nepal Police |
| 27 | FW | Abhishek Rijal | 29 January 2000 (aged 18) | (All Nepal Football Association) Nepal Police |
| 30 | MF | Hemant Thapa Magar | 7 January 1998 (aged 20) | (All Nepal Football Association) Chyasal Youth |
| 32 | DF | Rohit Chand* | 28 February 1992 (aged 26) | (Football Association of Indonesia) Persija Jakarta |
| 33 | GK | Sojit Gurung | 28 January 2000 (aged 18) | (All Nepal Football Association) Mai Valley |
| 35 | MF | Gaurab Budhathoki | 14 February 1998 (aged 20) | (All Nepal Football Association) Chyasal Youth |

* Over-aged player.

Group D

| Pos | Team | Pld | W | D | L | GF | GA | GD | Pts | Qualification |
|---|---|---|---|---|---|---|---|---|---|---|
| 1 | Vietnam | 3 | 3 | 0 | 0 | 6 | 0 | +6 | 9 | Advance to knockout stage |
| 2 | Japan | 3 | 2 | 0 | 1 | 5 | 1 | +4 | 6 | Advance to knockout stage |
| 3 | Pakistan | 3 | 1 | 0 | 2 | 2 | 8 | −6 | 3 | |
| 4 | Nepal | 3 | 0 | 0 | 3 | 1 | 5 | −4 | 0 | |

Source: Asian Games 2018
Rules for classification: Group stage tiebreakers
14 August 2018
19:00 UTC+7

| Japan | 1–0 | Nepal |
|---|---|---|
| Mitoma 7' | Report |

Wibawa Mukti Stadium, Cikarang
Referee: Sultan Al-Marzooqi (United Arab Emirates)

16 August 2018
19:00 UTC+7

| Nepal | 0–2 | Vietnam |
|---|---|---|
| | Report | Nguyễn Anh Đức 31'; Phan Văn Đức 63' |

Wibawa Mukti Stadium, Cikarang
Referee: Zhang Lei (China)

19 August 2018
16:00 UTC+7

| Pakistan | 2–1 | Nepal |
|---|---|---|
| Bilal 54'; Hussain 72' (pen.) | Report | Younas 12' (o.g.) |

Patriot Candrabhaga Stadium, Bekasi
Referee: Baraa Aisha (Palestine)

== Golf ==
Men

| Athlete | Event | Round 1 | Round 2 | Round 3 | Round 4 | Total | | |
| Athlete | Event | Score | Score | Score | Score | Score | Par | Rank |
|---|---|---|---|---|---|---|---|---|
| Prithvi Malla | Individual | 88 | 80 | 79 | 77 | 324 | +36 | 74 |
| Sukra Bahadur Rai | Individual | 81 | 76 | 77 | 81 | 315 | +27 | 58 |
| Tanka Bahadur Karki | Individual | 82 | 77 | 81 | 77 | 317 | +29 | 60 |
| Ajit B. K. | Individual | 83 | 80 | 81 | 83 | 327 | +39 | 78 |
| Prithvi Malla; Sukra Bahadur Rai; Tanka Bahadur Karki; Ajit B. K. | Team | 246 | 233 | 237 | 235 | 951 | +87 | 17 |

== Judo ==
Key:

- 1st number — Ippon
- 2nd number — Waza-ari
- s — Shido

Men

| Athlete | Event | Round of 32 | Round of 16 | Quarterfinals | Semifinals | Repechage | Final / BM | Rank |
| Athlete | Event | Opposition Result | Opposition Result | Opposition Result | Opposition Result | Opposition Result | Opposition Result | Rank |
|---|---|---|---|---|---|---|---|---|
| Indra Shresta | –66 kg | Kim H-u (PRK); L 00–10 | did not advance | | | | | |
| Sanjit Dangol | –73 kg | S Hamad (KSA); L 00–10s1 | did not advance | | | | | |
| Shree Ram Makaju | –90 kg | Bye | K Ustopiriyon (TJK); L 00s2–11 | did not advance | | | | |
| Ravin Shrestha | –100 kg | Bye | S Juraev (UZB); L 00s2–10 | did not advance | | | | |

Women

| Athlete | Event | Round of 32 | Round of 16 | Quarterfinals | Semifinals | Repechage | Final / BM | Rank |
| Athlete | Event | Opposition Result | Opposition Result | Opposition Result | Opposition Result | Opposition Result | Opposition Result | Rank |
|---|---|---|---|---|---|---|---|---|
| Devika Khadka | –52 kg | Bye | N Tsunoda (JPN); L 00s3–10 | did not advance | | | | |
| Manita Shrestha Pradhan | –57 kg | Nguyễn TBN (VIE); L 01s2–10s1 | did not advance | | | | | |
| Phupu Lhamu Khatri | –63 kg | —N/a | AY Fradivtha (INA); L 00–01s1 | did not advance | | | | |
| Punam Shrestha | –78 kg | —N/a | Bye | Park Y-j (KOR); L 00s2–10 | Did not advance | Z Raifova (KAZ); L 00s3–10s1 | did not advance | |

Mixed

| Athlete | Event | Round of 16 | Quarterfinals | Semifinals | Repechage | Final / BM | Rank |
| Athlete | Event | Opposition Result | Opposition Result | Opposition Result | Opposition Result | Opposition Result | Rank |
|---|---|---|---|---|---|---|---|
| Sanjit Dangol; Shree Ram Makaju; Indra Shresta; Ravin Shrestha; Devika Khadka; Phupu Lhamu Khatri; Punam Shrestha; Manita Shrestha Pradhan | Team | India (IND); L 1–4 | did not advance | | | | |

== Kabaddi ==
Nepal men's team competed at the Games with 12 member squad. The team did not advance to the knockout stage after finished fifth in the group stage.

Summary

| Team | Event | Group stage | | | | | | Semifinal | Final | |
| Team | Event | Opposition Score | Opposition Score | Opposition Score | Opposition Score | Opposition Score | Rank | Opposition Score | Opposition Score | Rank |
|---|---|---|---|---|---|---|---|---|---|---|
| Nepal men's | Men | Indonesia; L 29−33 | Japan; L 28−31 | Iran; L 21−75 | Malaysia; W 29−17 | Pakistan; L 20−38 | 5 | did not advance | | 9 |

=== Men's tournament ===
Team roster

- Mahesh Bohara (Captain)
- Durga Kumal
- Bijay Chand
- Lal Mohar Yadav
- Ranjit
- Nageshwor Tharu
- Bhupendra Chand
- Amit Kunwar
- Sagar Chaudhary
- Mahesh Mondal
- Kumar Lama
- Ashok Thapa Magar

Group B

| Pos | Team | Pld | W | D | L | PF | PA | PD | Pts | Qualification |
|---|---|---|---|---|---|---|---|---|---|---|
| 1 | Iran | 5 | 5 | 0 | 0 | 289 | 109 | +180 | 10 | Semifinals |
| 2 | Pakistan | 5 | 4 | 0 | 1 | 185 | 98 | +87 | 8 | Semifinals |
| 3 | Indonesia | 5 | 3 | 0 | 2 | 132 | 182 | −50 | 6 | |
| 4 | Japan | 5 | 2 | 0 | 3 | 121 | 162 | −41 | 4 | |
| 5 | Nepal | 5 | 1 | 0 | 4 | 127 | 194 | −67 | 2 | |
| 6 | Malaysia | 5 | 0 | 0 | 5 | 100 | 209 | −109 | 0 | |

Source: OCA

19 August
18:00

| Indonesia | 33–29 (HT: 20–14) | Nepal |

Garuda Theatre, Jakarta

21 August
16:00

| Japan | 31–28 (HT: 12–17) | Nepal |

Garuda Theatre, Jakarta

22 August
14:00

| Iran | 75–21 (HT: 38–6) | Nepal |

Garuda Theatre, Jakarta

22 August
17:00

| Malaysia | 17–29 (HT: 10–12) | Nepal |

Garuda Theatre, Jakarta

23 August
10:00

| Nepal | 20–38 (HT: 12–15) | Pakistan |

Garuda Theatre, Jakarta

== Karate ==
Nepal participated in the karate competition at the Games with eight athletes (4 men's and 4 women's).

== Kurash ==
Men

| Athlete | Event | Round of 32 | Round of 16 | Quarterfinal | Semifinal | Final | |
| Athlete | Event | Opposition Score | Opposition Score | Opposition Score | Opposition Score | Opposition Score | Rank |
|---|---|---|---|---|---|---|---|
| Upendra Thapa | –66 kg | S Samiullah (PAK); W 001−001 | R Buriev (UZB); L 000−112 | did not advance | | | |

Women

| Athlete | Event | Round of 32 | Round of 16 | Quarterfinal | Semifinal | Final | |
| Athlete | Event | Opposition Score | Opposition Score | Opposition Score | Opposition Score | Opposition Score | Rank |
|---|---|---|---|---|---|---|---|
| Bhagawati Majhi | –52 kg | Tsou C-w (TPE); L 000−100 | did not advance | | | | |

== Paragliding ==
Men

| Athlete | Event | Round | | | | | | | | | | Total | Rank |
| Athlete | Event | 1 | 2 | 3 | 4 | 5 | 6 | 7 | 8 | 9 | 10 | Total | Rank |
|---|---|---|---|---|---|---|---|---|---|---|---|---|---|
| Bijay Gautam | Individual accuracy | 9 | 13 | 28 | ~~238~~ | 122 | 78 | 21 | 4 | 22 | 86 | 383 | 8 |
| Sushil Gurung | Individual accuracy | ~~500~~ | 113 | 83 | 500 | 40 | 277 | 125 | 1 | 500 | 2 | 1641 | 24 |
| Bimal Adhikari; Bijay Gautam; Sushil Gurung; Yukesh Gurung; Bishal Thapa | Team accuracy | 734 | 937 | 347 | 1259 | 370 | 1007 | —N/a | | | | 4654 | 8 |
| Bimal Adhikari; Bijay Gautam; Sushil Gurung; Yukesh Gurung; Bishal Thapa | Cross-country | 2255 | 694 | 2844 | 2774 | 2797 | —N/a | | | | | 11364 | 2nd place, silver medalist(s) |

Women

| Athlete | Event | Round | | | | | | | | | | Total | Rank |
| Athlete | Event | 1 | 2 | 3 | 4 | 5 | 6 | 7 | 8 | 9 | 10 | Total | Rank |
|---|---|---|---|---|---|---|---|---|---|---|---|---|---|
| Prativa Bhujel | Individual accuracy | ~~500~~ | 117 | 500 | 500 | 359 | 500 | 500 | 9 | 500 | 252 | 3237 | 15 |
| Trisha Shrestha Bomjan | Individual accuracy | 151 | 129 | 395 | ~~500~~ | 330 | 161 | 500 | 500 | 500 | 312 | 2978 | 14 |
| Prativa Bhujel; Trisha Shrestha Bomjan; Sabita Tamang | Team accuracy | 912 | 336 | 1395 | 1500 | 1189 | 1161 | —N/a | | | | 6493 | 7 |
| Prativa Bhujel; Trisha Shrestha Bomjan; Sabita Tamang | Cross-country | 285 | 353 | 308 | 216 | 248 | —N/a | | | | | 1410 | 6 |

== Pencak silat ==
Tanding

| Athlete | Event | Round of 16 | Quarterfinals | Semifinals | Final | |
| Athlete | Event | Opposition Result | Opposition Result | Opposition Result | Opposition Result | Rank |
|---|---|---|---|---|---|---|
| B. K. Vivek Kumar | Men's –65 kg | M Rahimi (IRI); L 0–5 | did not advance | | | |

== Roller sports ==
=== Skateboarding ===
| Athlete | Event | Preliminary | | Final | |
| Athlete | Event | Result | Rank | Result | Rank |
|---|---|---|---|---|---|
| Neris Thapa | Men's street | 14.3 | 15 | did not advance | |

== Sepak takraw ==
Men

| Athlete | Event | Group stage | | | | | Semifinal | Final | |
| Athlete | Event | Opposition Score | Opposition Score | Opposition Score | Opposition Score | Rank | Opposition Score | Opposition Score | Rank |
|---|---|---|---|---|---|---|---|---|---|
| Dipesh Jung Thapa; Sanjeet Dhimal; Rupesh Sunar; Govinda Magar; Rabin Bhattarai | Regu | Malaysia (MAS); L 0–2 | South Korea (KOR); L 0–2 | China (CHN); L 0–2 | India (IND); L 0–2 | 5 | did not advance | | |
| Dipesh Jung Thapa; Sanjeet Dhimal; Rupesh Sunar; Govinda Magar; Rabin Bhattarai | Quadrant | Vietnam (VIE); L 0–2 | Singapore (SGP); L 0–2 | Pakistan (PAK); W 2–0 | Iran (IRI); L 0–2 | 4 | did not advance | | |

== Shooting ==
Men

| Athlete | Event | Qualification | | Final | |
| Athlete | Event | Points | Rank | Points | Rank |
|---|---|---|---|---|---|
| Sushe Chaudhary | 10 m air rifle | 581.0 | 42 | did not advance | |

Women

| Athlete | Event | Qualification | | Final | |
| Athlete | Event | Points | Rank | Points | Rank |
|---|---|---|---|---|---|
| Sushmita Nepa | 10 m air rifle | 587.1 | 46 | did not advance | |
| Kalpana Pariyar | 10 m air rifle | 594.8 | 45 | did not advance | |

Mixed team

| Athlete | Event | Qualification | | Final | |
| Athlete | Event | Points | Rank | Points | Rank |
|---|---|---|---|---|---|
| Sushe Chaudhary; Sushmita Nepa | 10 m air rifle | 776.4 | 22 | did not advance | |

== Sport climbing ==
Speed

| Athlete | Event | Qualification | | Round of 16 | Quarterfinals | Semifinals | Final / BM | |
| Athlete | Event | Best | Rank | Opposition Time | Opposition Time | Opposition Time | Opposition Time | Rank |
|---|---|---|---|---|---|---|---|---|
| Pemba Sherpa | Men's | 12.000 | 26 | did not advance | | | | |
| Pranil Man Shrestha | Men's | 12.269 | 27 | did not advance | | | | |

Combined

| Athlete | Event | Qualification | | | | | Final | | | | |
| Athlete | Event | Speed Point | Boulder Point | Lead Point | Total | Rank | Speed Point | Boulder Point | Lead Point | Total | Rank |
|---|---|---|---|---|---|---|---|---|---|---|---|
| Pemba Sherpa | Men's | 22 | 22 | 19 | 9196 | 21 | did not advance | | | | |
| Pranil Man Shrestha | Men's | 21 | 22 | 20 | 9240 | 22 | did not advance | | | | |

== Squash ==
Nepal competed in the squash competition with 4 athletes. The athletes ended their journey by finishing in the first round.

Singles

| Athlete | Event | Round of 32 | Round of 16 | Quarterfinals | Semifinals | Final | |
| Athlete | Event | Opposition Score | Opposition Score | Opposition Score | Opposition Score | Opposition Score | Rank |
|---|---|---|---|---|---|---|---|
| Amrit Thapa Magar | Men's | M Lee (HKG); L 0–3 | did not advance | | | | |
| Arhant Keshar Simha | Men's | T Aslam (PAK); L 0–3 | did not advance | | | | |

Team

| Athlete | Event | Group stage | | | | | | Semifinal | Final | |
| Athlete | Event | Opposition Score | Opposition Score | Opposition Score | Opposition Score | Opposition Score | Rank | Opposition Score | Opposition Score | Rank |
|---|---|---|---|---|---|---|---|---|---|---|
| Magar Amrit Thapa; Arhant Keshar Simha; Rajendra Shekya; Gyanu Chaudhary | Men's | South Korea (KOR); L 0–3 | Pakistan (PAK); L 0–3 | Japan (JPN); L 0–3 | Philippines (PHI); L 0–3 | Hong Kong (HKG); L 0–3 | 6 | did not advance | | |

== Swimming ==
Nepal entered the Games with four swimmers (2 men's and 2 women's). All the swimmers did not advance to the final round.

Men

| Athlete | Event | Heats | | Final | |
| Athlete | Event | Time | Rank | Time | Rank |
|---|---|---|---|---|---|
| Sirish Gurung | 50 m freestyle | 26.33 | 46 | did not advance | |
| Sirish Gurung | 100 m freestyle | 57.92 | 40 | did not advance | |
| Shuvam Shrestha | 50 m breaststroke | 32.45 | 32 | did not advance | |
| Shuvam Shrestha | 100 m breaststroke | 1:11.37 | 27 | did not advance | |

Women

| Athlete | Event | Heats | | Final | |
| Athlete | Event | Time | Rank | Time | Rank |
|---|---|---|---|---|---|
| Tisa Shakya | 50 m freestyle | 29.61 | 23 | did not advance | |
| Tisa Shakya | 100 m freestyle | 1:03.96 | 22 | did not advance | |
| Tisa Shakya | 50 m breaststroke | 39.46 | 26 | did not advance | |
| Gaurika Singh | 50 m freestyle | 28.50 | 21 | did not advance | |
| Gaurika Singh | 100 m freestyle | 1:00.82 | 18 | did not advance | |
| Gaurika Singh | 200 m freestyle | 2:12.53 | 19 | did not advance | |

== Table tennis ==
Individual

| Athlete | Event | Round 1 | Round 2 | Round of 16 | Quarterfinals | Semifinals | Final | |
| Athlete | Event | Opposition Score | Opposition Score | Opposition Score | Opposition Score | Opposition Score | Opposition Score | Rank |
|---|---|---|---|---|---|---|---|---|
| Amar Lal Malla | Men's singles | E Chinbat (MGL); L 3–4 | did not advance | | | | | |
| Santoo Shrestha | Men's singles | Cheong CC (MAC); L 2–4 | did not advance | | | | | |
| Nabita Shrestha | Women's singles | Tam SF (MAC); W 4–3 | Doo HK (HKG); L 0–4 | did not advance | | | | |
| Swechchha Nembang | Women's singles | D Batbayar (MGL); L 0–4 | did not advance | | | | | |
| Amar Lal Malla; Swechchha Nembang | Mixed doubles | A Al-Naggar / M Faramarzi (QAT); W 3–2 | Wong CT / Doo HK (HKG); L 0–3 | did not advance | | | | |
| Santoo Shrestha; Nabita Shrestha | Mixed doubles | T Myandal / U Munkhbat (MGL); W 3–0 | Lin GY / Wang MY (CHN); L 1–3 | did not advance | | | | |

Team

| Athlete | Event | Group stage | | | | | Quarterfinal | Semifinal | Final | |
| Athlete | Event | Opposition Score | Opposition Score | Opposition Score | Opposition Score | Rank | Opposition Score | Opposition Score | Opposition Score | Rank |
|---|---|---|---|---|---|---|---|---|---|---|
| Amar Lal Malla; Deep Saun; Santoo Shrestha | Men's | China (CHN); L 0–3 | Malaysia (MAS); L 0–3 | North Korea (PRK); L 0–3 | Laos (LAO); W 3–1 | 4 | did not advance | | | |
| Nabita Shrestha; Swechchha Nembang; Rabina Maharjan | Women's | Malaysia (MAS); L 0–3 | Singapore (SGP); L 0–3 | Hong Kong (HKG); L 0–3 | Vietnam (VIE); L 0–3 | 5 | did not advance | | | |

== Taekwondo ==
Nepal competed in taekwondo competition with 14 athletes (6 men's and 8 women's). In the individual poomsae event, the taekwondoan defeated in the first round, while the women's team advance to the quarter-finals after received walkover from the Uzbekistan team. In the kyorugi event, the athletes also defeated in the early round.

Poomsae

| Athlete | Event | Round of 16 | Quarterfinal | Semifinal | Final | |
| Athlete | Event | Opposition Score | Opposition Score | Opposition Score | Opposition Score | Rank |
|---|---|---|---|---|---|---|
| Kamal Shrestha | Men's individual | Chen C (TPE); L 7.51–8.38 | did not advance | | | |
| Parbati Gurung | Women's individual | Liao W-h (TPE); L 7.54–8.10 | did not advance | | | |
| Sina Maden; Nita Gurung; Parbati Gurung | Women's team | Uzbekistan; WO | Chinese Taipei; L 7.42–8.19 | did not advance | | |

Kyorugi

| Athlete | Event | Round of 32 | Round of 16 | Quarterfinal | Semifinal | Final | |
| Athlete | Event | Opposition Score | Opposition Score | Opposition Score | Opposition Score | Opposition Score | Rank |
|---|---|---|---|---|---|---|---|
| Sagar Guvaju | Men's −58 kg | T Dorji (BHU); W 54–40 | Võ Q H (VIE); L 5–25 | did not advance | | | |
| Bir Bahadur Mahara | Men's −63 kg | A A Bakhshi (AFG); W 24–13 | K Baktiyaruly (KAZ); L 19–30 | did not advance | | | |
| Gyanendra Hamal | Men's −68 kg | J Wangchuk (BHU); W 39–17 | R Rozali (MAS); L 2–30 | did not advance | | | |
| Bhupen Shrestha | Men's −80 kg | Bye | R Hussaini (AFG); L 7–27 | did not advance | | | |
| Anoj Pujari | Men's +80 kg | —N/a | R Zhaparov (UZB); L 0–21 | did not advance | | | |
| Ashmita Khadka | Women's −49 kg | Bye | N Kiani (IRI); L 4–43 | did not advance | | | |
| Neema Gurung | Women's −53 kg | Bye | L Aoun (LBN); L 10–23 | did not advance | | | |
| Gyani Chunara | Women's −57 kg | Bye | K Choden (BHU); W 28–6 | P Lopez (PHI); L 0–20 | did not advance | | |
| Sangita Basyel | Women's −67 kg | —N/a | D Arpon (PHI); L 17–20 | did not advance | | | |
| Nisha Rawal | Women's +67 kg | —N/a | Gao P (CHN); L 6–22 | did not advance | | | |

== Tennis ==
Men

| Athlete | Event | Round of 64 | Round of 32 | Round of 16 | Quarterfinals | Semifinals | Final | |
| Athlete | Event | Opposition Score | Opposition Score | Opposition Score | Opposition Score | Opposition Score | Opposition Score | Rank |
|---|---|---|---|---|---|---|---|---|
| Abhishek Bastola | Singles | Trịnh LG (VIE); L 6–1, 3–6, 3–6 | did not advance | | | | | |
| Samrakshak Bajracharya | Singles | MR Fitriadi (INA); L 2–6, 2–6 | did not advance | | | | | |
| Samrakshak Bajracharya; Abhishek Bastola | Doubles | Bye | S Nagal / R Ramanathan (IND); L 1–6, 1–6 | did not advance | | | | |

Women

| Athlete | Event | Round of 64 | Round of 32 | Round of 16 | Quarterfinals | Semifinals | Final | |
| Athlete | Event | Opposition Score | Opposition Score | Opposition Score | Opposition Score | Opposition Score | Opposition Score | Rank |
|---|---|---|---|---|---|---|---|---|
| Mahika Rana | Singles | C Fodor (VIE); L 0–6, 1–6 | did not advance | | | | | |
| Mayanka Rana | Singles | E Chong (HKG); L 0–6, 1–6 | did not advance | | | | | |
| Mahika Rana; Mayanka Rana | Doubles | —N/a | Z Abdul Rasheed / AI Mahir (MDV); W 6–4, 6–1 | E Hayashi / M Uchijima (JPN); L 0–6, 0–6 | did not advance | | | |

Mixed

| Athlete | Event | Round of 64 | Round of 32 | Round of 16 | Quarterfinals | Semifinals | Final | |
| Athlete | Event | Opposition Score | Opposition Score | Opposition Score | Opposition Score | Opposition Score | Opposition Score | Rank |
|---|---|---|---|---|---|---|---|---|
| Anne Mathema; Samrakshak Bajracharya | Doubles | Bye | E Chong / Wong C-h (HKG); L 1–6, 0–6 | did not advance | | | | |
| Mahika Rana; Pranav Khanal | Doubles | Bye | Zhang L / Yeung P-l (HKG); L 0–6, 1–6 | did not advance | | | | |

== Triathlon ==
Individual

| Athlete | Event | Swim (1.5 km) | Trans 1 | Bike (39.6 km) | Trans 2 | Run (10 km) | Total Time | Rank |
|---|---|---|---|---|---|---|---|---|
| Dipesh Chaudhary | Men's | | | | | | DSQ | – |

Mixed relay

| Athletes | Event | Total Times per Athlete (Swim 300 m, Bike 6.3 km, Run 2.1 km) | Total Group Time | Rank |
|---|---|---|---|---|
| Basanta Tharu; Dipesh Chaudhary; Roja K C Sony Gurung | Mixed relay | 25:13; 25:46; 30:22; 31:34 | 1:52:55 | 12 |

== Volleyball ==
=== Indoor volleyball ===
| Team | Event | Group stage | | Playoffs | Quarterfinals / Pl. | Semifinals / Pl. | Final / BM / Pl. | |
| Team | Event | Oppositions Scores | Rank | Opposition Score | Opposition Score | Opposition Score | Opposition Score | Rank |
|---|---|---|---|---|---|---|---|---|
| Nepal men's | Men's tournament | Chinese Taipei: L 0–3; South Korea: L 0–3 | 3 | Did not advance | Mongolia; W 3–1 | Sri Lanka; L 1–3 | Kyrgyzstan; W 3–0 | 15 |

==== Men's tournament ====
Team roster

The following is the Nepal roster in the men's volleyball tournament of the 2018 Asian Games.

Head coach: (Netherlands) Björn Lesley

| No. | Name | Date of birth | Height | Weight | Spike | Block | Club |
|---|---|---|---|---|---|---|---|
| 1 | Bishal Bahadur BK | 13 August 1995 | 1.84 m (6 ft 0 in) | 75 kg (165 lb) | 340 cm (130 in) | 325 cm (128 in) | (Nepal) Police |
| 2 | Deepak Raj Joshi | 18 July 1994 | 1.94 m (6 ft 4 in) | 74 kg (163 lb) | 329 cm (130 in) | 315 cm (124 in) | (Nepal) Police |
| 3 | Hari Bahadur Adhikari | 24 July 1991 | 1.85 m (6 ft 1 in) | 75 kg (165 lb) | 330 cm (130 in) | 310 cm (120 in) | (Nepal) Army |
| 4 | Man Bahadur Shrestha | 11 March 1996 | 1.82 m (6 ft 0 in) | 75 kg (165 lb) | 332 cm (131 in) | 305 cm (120 in) | (Nepal) Army |
| 5 | Bhairab Bahadur BAM | 23 August 1990 | 1.82 m (6 ft 0 in) | 75 kg (165 lb) | 330 cm (130 in) | 320 cm (130 in) | (Nepal) Army |
| 6 | Dhan Bahadur Bhatta | 25 April 1991 | 1.83 m (6 ft 0 in) | 75 kg (165 lb) | 335 cm (132 in) | 312 cm (123 in) | (Nepal) Army |
| 7 | Durga Prasad Mahato | 7 July 1994 | 1.78 m (5 ft 10 in) | 76 kg (168 lb) | 325 cm (128 in) | 320 cm (130 in) | (Nepal) Army |
| 8 | Narendra Giri | 16 April 1990 | 1.88 m (6 ft 2 in) | 80 kg (180 lb) | 325 cm (128 in) | 308 cm (121 in) | (Nepal) Army |
| 9 | Em Bahadur Magar (c) | 20 June 1982 | 1.83 m (6 ft 0 in) | 75 kg (165 lb) | 325 cm (128 in) | 310 cm (120 in) | (Nepal) Police |
| 10 | Raju sherchan | 11 May 1993 | 1.95 m (6 ft 5 in) | 82 kg (181 lb) | 333 cm (131 in) | 312 cm (123 in) | (Nepal) Police |
| 11 | Kul Bahadur Thapa | 26 March 1988 | 1.84 m (6 ft 0 in) | 78 kg (172 lb) | 322 cm (127 in) | 305 cm (120 in) | (Nepal) Police |
| 12 | Ishwor Thapa | 28 May 1986 | 1.64 m (5 ft 5 in) | 62 kg (137 lb) | 285 cm (112 in) | 270 cm (110 in) | (Nepal) Army |

Pool D

| Pos | Team | Pld | W | L | Pts | SW | SL | SR | SPW | SPL | SPR | Qualification |
|---|---|---|---|---|---|---|---|---|---|---|---|---|
| 1 | South Korea | 2 | 2 | 0 | 5 | 6 | 2 | 3.000 | 184 | 147 | 1.252 | Classification for 1–12 |
| 2 | Chinese Taipei | 2 | 1 | 1 | 4 | 5 | 3 | 1.667 | 179 | 166 | 1.078 | Classification for 1–12 |
| 3 | Nepal | 2 | 0 | 2 | 0 | 0 | 6 | 0.000 | 100 | 150 | 0.667 | Classification for 13–20 |

Source: OCA

| Date | Time | | Score | | Set 1 | Set 2 | Set 3 | Set 4 | Set 5 | Total | Report |
|---|---|---|---|---|---|---|---|---|---|---|---|
| 22 Aug | 12:30 | Nepal | 0–3 | Chinese Taipei | 23–25 | 19–25 | 15–25 | | | 57–75 | Report |
| 24 Aug | 16:30 | South Korea | 3–0 | Nepal | 25–16 | 25–13 | 25–14 | | | 75–43 | Report |
| 28 Aug | 12:30 | Nepal | 3–1 | Mongolia | 26–28 | 25–16 | 30–28 | 25–19 | | 106–91 | Report |
| 30 Aug | 16:30 | Sri Lanka | 3–1 | Nepal | 23–25 | 25–16 | 26–24 | 25–21 | | 99–86 | Report |
| 31 Aug | 17:00 | Nepal | 3–0 | Kyrgyzstan | 25–0 | 25–0 | 25–0 | | | 75–0 | Report |

== Weightlifting ==
Nepal participated in weightlifting competition with 4 weightlifters (2 men's and 2 women's). Kamal Bahadur Adhikari made the national record to his name lifting 122 kg in snatch, 162 in clean and jerk and 284 in total.

Men

| Athlete | Event | Snatch | | Clean & Jerk | | Total | Rank |
| Athlete | Event | Result | Rank | Result | Rank | Total | Rank |
|---|---|---|---|---|---|---|---|
| Kamal Bahadur Adhikari | −69 kg | 119 | 16 | 160 | 13 | 279 | 14 |
| Bikash Thapa | −77 kg | 113 | 17 | 135 | 16 | 248 | 15 |

Women

| Athlete | Event | Snatch | | Clean & Jerk | | Total | Rank |
| Athlete | Event | Result | Rank | Result | Rank | Total | Rank |
|---|---|---|---|---|---|---|---|
| Sanju Chaudhary | −53 kg | 72 | 12 | 86 | 12 | 158 | 12 |
| Tara Pun | −75 kg | 74 | 8 | 101 | 8 | 175 | 8 |

== Wrestling ==
Nepal participated six times in the wrestling competition at the Games since 1998.

Key:

- F – Victory by fall.
- PP – Decision by points – the loser with technical points.
- PO – Decision by points – the loser without technical points.
- ST – Great superiority – the loser without technical points and a margin of victory of at least 8 (Greco-Roman) or 10 (freestyle) points.

Men's freestyle

| Athlete | Event | Qualification | Round of 16 | Quarterfinal | Semifinal | Repechage 1 | Repechage 2 | Final / BM | |
| Athlete | Event | Opposition Result | Opposition Result | Opposition Result | Opposition Result | Opposition Result | Opposition Result | Opposition Result | Rank |
|---|---|---|---|---|---|---|---|---|---|
| Bhagawati Sah Teli | −57 kg | Bye | R Atri (IRI); L 0–10 | did not advance | | | | | 16 |
| Saroj Yadav | −65 kg | Bye | Batmagnai (MGL); L 0–10 | did not advance | | | | | 19 |
| Suresh Chunara | −74 kg | Y Fujinami (JPN); L 0–10 | did not advance | | | | | | 20 |

== Wushu ==
Taolu

| Athlete | Event | Event 1 | | Event 2 | | Total | Rank |
| Athlete | Event | Result | Rank | Result | Rank | Total | Rank |
|---|---|---|---|---|---|---|---|
| Bijay Sinjali | Men's changquan | 8.25 | 14 | —N/a | | 8.25 | 14 |
| Yubaraj Thapa | Men's nanquan and nangun | 8.22 | 21 | 9.20 | 17 | 17.42 | 21 |
| Sushmita Tamang | Women's changquan | 9.25 | 7 | —N/a | | 9.25 | 7 |
| Nima Gharti Magar | Women's nanquan and nandao | 8.70 | 11 | 9.17 | 11 | 17.87 | 11 |

Sanda

| Athlete | Event | Round of 32 | Round of 16 | Quarterfinal | Semifinal | Final | |
| Athlete | Event | Opposition Score | Opposition Score | Opposition Score | Opposition Score | Opposition Score | Rank |
|---|---|---|---|---|---|---|---|
| Padam Thakulla | Men's –56 kg | Bye | K Soukaphone (LAO); L 0–2 | did not advance | | | |
| Mangal Tharu | Men's –60 kg | H Sofyan (INA); L 0–0 ^{TV} | did not advance | | | | |
| Birman Lama | men's –65 kg | —N/a | D Khieosavath (LAO); L 0–0 ^{TV} | did not advance | | | |
| Chitra Sing Thakuri | Men's –70 kg | —N/a | Ham G-s (KOR); L 0–2 | did not advance | | | |
| Juni Rai | Women's –52 kg | —N/a | Nguyễn T T T (VIE); L 0–2 | did not advance | | | |
| Lumanti Shrestha | Women's –60 kg | —N/a | Bye | S Bualuang (THA); L 0–0 ^{TV} | did not advance | | |

Key: * TV – Technical victory.
