= Afghanistan at the 2018 Asian Games =

- IOC code: AFG
- NOC: Afghanistan National Olympic Committee
- Website: www.olympic.af

in Jakarta and Palembang August 18 – September 2
- Competitors: 76 in 15 sports
- Medals Ranked 35th: Gold 0 Silver 0 Bronze 2 Total 2

Asian Games appearances (overview)
- 1951; 1954; 1958; 1962; 1966; 1970; 1974; 1978; 1982; 1986; 1990; 1994; 1998; 2002; 2006; 2010; 2014; 2018; 2022; 2026

Afghanistan competed at the 2018 Asian Games in Jakarta and Palembang, Indonesia, from 18 August to 2 September 2018.

Afghanistan first participated at the Asian Games when the first Games were in Delhi in 1951. The country had won five silver and 6 bronze medals until the last event at Incheon in 2014.

== Medalists ==
The following Afghanistan competitors won medals at the Games.

Medal	Name	Sport	Event	Date
Bronze	Khalid Hotak	Wushu	Men's sanda 65 kg	22 Aug
Bronze	Mansour Sarwari	Kurash	Men's +90 kg	28 Aug

Medals by sport
Sport	1st place, gold medalist(s)	2nd place, silver medalist(s)	3rd place, bronze medalist(s)	Total
Kurash	0	0	1	1
Wushu	0	0	1	1
Total	0	0	2	2

Medals by day
Day	Date	1st place, gold medalist(s)	2nd place, silver medalist(s)	3rd place, bronze medalist(s)	Total
1	August 19	0	0	0	0
2	August 20	0	0	0	0
3	August 21	0	0	0	0
4	August 22	0	0	1	1
5	August 23	0	0	0	0
6	August 24	0	0	0	0
7	August 25	0	0	0	0
8	August 26	0	0	0	0
9	August 27	0	0	0	0
10	August 28	0	0	1	1
11	August 29	0	0	0	0
12	August 30	0	0	0	0
13	August 31	0	0	0	0
14	September 1	0	0	0	0
15	September 2	0	0	0	0
Total		0	0	2	2

== Competitors ==
The following is a list of the number of competitors representing Afghanistan that participated at the Games:

Sport	Men	Women	Total
Athletics	1	1	2
Badminton	1	1	2
Basketball	3	0	3
Beach volleyball	4	0	4
Boxing	4	0	4
Ju-jitsu	5	2	7
Judo	4	0	4
Karate	4	2	6
Kurash	8	2	10
Paragliding	2	2	4
Rugby sevens	12	0	12
Sambo^{[1]}	1	0	1
Swimming	1	0	1
Taekwondo	4	0	4
Weightlifting	2	0	2
Wrestling	6	0	6
Wushu	5	0	5
Total	66	10	76

^{1} Athlete who also competed in kurash.

== Athletics ==
Key

- Note–Ranks given for track events are within the athlete's heat only
- Q = Qualified for the next round
- q = Qualified for the next round as a fastest loser or, in field events, by position without achieving the qualifying target
- NR = National record
- GR = Games record
- PB = Personal best
- SB = Season best
- DNF = Did not finish
- DNS = Did not start
- NM = No mark
- N/A = Round not applicable for the event
- Bye = Athlete not required to compete in round

Track & road events

Athlete	Event	Heat		Quarterfinal		Semifinal		Final	
Athlete	Event	Time	Rank	Time	Rank	Time	Rank	Time	Rank
Abdul Wahib Zahiri	Men's 100 m	11.65	7	Did not advance					
Kamia Yousufi	Women's 100 m	13.33	8	Did not advance					

== Badminton ==
Singles

Athlete	Event	Round of 64	Round of 32	Round of 16	Quarterfinals	Semifinals	Final	
Athlete	Event	Opposition Score	Opposition Score	Opposition Score	Opposition Score	Opposition Score	Opposition Score	Rank
Sayed Imran Miri	Men	Bye	H Z Shaheed (MDV); L 20–22, 11–21	Did not advance				
Saraj Lidaa	Women	—	A Yamaguchi (JPN); L 0–21, 3–21	Did not advance				

== Basketball ==
Summary

Team	Event	Group stage						Quarterfinal	Semifinals / Pl.	Final / BM / Pl.	
Team	Event	Opposition Score	Opposition Score	Opposition Score	Opposition Score	Opposition Score	Rank	Opposition Score	Opposition Score	Opposition Score	Rank
Afghanistan men's	Men's 3x3 tournament	Kazakhstan; L 12−21	Malaysia; L 9−22	Turkmenistan; L 9−22	Iraq; L 12−21	Iran; L 5−20	6	Did not advance			

=== 3x3 basketball ===
Afghanistan national 3x3 team participated in the Games, the men's team placed in the pool D based on the FIBA 3x3 federation ranking.

==== Men's tournament ====
Roster

The following is the Afghanistan roster in the men's 3x3 basketball tournament of the 2018 Asian Games.

- Mir Abdul Wahab Mirzad
- Sayed Amin Sadat
- Jahan Zeeb Khairi

Pool D

Pos	Team	Pld	W	L	PF	PA	PD	Qualification
1	Iran	5	5	0	99	56	+43	Quarterfinals
2	Kazakhstan	5	3 (Note: Head-to-head result: KAZ 21–18 IRQ.)	2	91	82	+9	Quarterfinals
3	Iraq	5	3	2	90	82	+8	
4	Malaysia	5	2 (Note: Head-to-head result: MAS 17–13 TKM.)	3	82	80	+2	
5	Turkmenistan	5	2	3	73	76	−3	
6	Afghanistan	5	0	5	47	106	−59	

Source: OCA
Notes:

22 August
17:50

Kazakhstan	21–12	Afghanistan
Pts: Aitkali 12		Pts: Khairi 9

Gelora Bung Karno Tennis Center Court, Jakarta
Referees: Quinn (INA), Lim (MAS)

22 August
19:20

Malaysia	22–9	Afghanistan
Pts: Liew 8		Pts: Mirzad 5

Gelora Bung Karno Tennis Center Court, Jakarta
Referees: Ho (HKG), Tan (SGP)

22 August
21:30

Turkmenistan	22–9	Afghanistan
Pts: Mämmetmyradow 10		Pts: Khairi 6

Gelora Bung Karno Tennis Center Court, Jakarta
Referees: Ito (JPN), Al-Harthi (OMA)

25 August
16:20

Afghanistan	12–21	Iraq
Pts: Khairi 9		Pts: Hasan 10

Gelora Bung Karno Tennis Center Court, Jakarta
Referees: Ito (JPN), Quinn (INA)

25 August
18:10

Afghanistan	5–20	Iran
Pts: Mirzad, Khairi 2		Pts: Allahverdi 6

Gelora Bung Karno Tennis Center Court, Jakarta
Referees: Liu (MAS), Al-Harthi (OMA)

== Boxing ==
Men

Athlete	Event	Round of 32	Round of 16	Quarterfinals	Semifinals	Final	Rank
Athlete	Event	Opposition Result	Opposition Result	Opposition Result	Opposition Result	Opposition Result	Rank
Laisullah Azizi	–56 kg	SA Amoragam (INA); L 0–5	Did not advance				
Mohammad Khaibar Nooristani	–60 kg	T Samdrup (BHU); WO	Did not advance				
Zafar Azizi	–64 kg	Ri K-t (PRK); L 0–5	Did not advance				
Waisuddin Ghawsi	–69 kg	Trần ĐT (VIE); WO	Did not advance				

== Ju-jitsu ==
Afghanistan entered the ju-jitsu competition with 7 athletes (5 men's and 2 women's).

Key:

- ADV – Won by advantages.
- RDC – Won by referee decision.
- SUB – Won by submission.

Men

Athlete	Event	Round of 64	Round of 32	Round of 16	Quarterfinals	Semifinals	Repechage	Final / BM	Rank
Athlete	Event	Opposition Result	Opposition Result	Opposition Result	Opposition Result	Opposition Result	Opposition Result	Opposition Result	Rank
Hussain Bakhsh Safari	–62 kg	—	N Khas-Erdene (MGL); W 4–0	F Al-Harahsheh (JOR); L 0–13	Did not advance				
Mahdi Wakili	–69 kg	—	A Al-Murdhi (KSA); L 0–100^{SUB}	Did not advance					
Abdul Hamid Mehrdil	–77 kg	Bye	M Al-Qubaisi (UAE); L 0–8	Did not advance					
Jawad Andishmand	–85 kg	—	A Saud (KSA); L 2–2^{RDC}	Did not advance					
Abdulsabor Rahimi	–94 kg	—	Bye	E Al-Sumaid (KUW); L 0–4	Did not advance				

Women

Athlete	Event	Round of 32	Round of 16	Quarterfinals	Semifinals	Repechage	Final / BM	Rank
Athlete	Event	Opposition Result	Opposition Result	Opposition Result	Opposition Result	Opposition Result	Opposition Result	Rank
Arifa Sanjar	–49 kg	Bye	M Al-Hinaai (UAE); WO	Did not advance				
Fatima Sultani	–62 kg	B Al-Matrooshi (UAE); L 0–100^{SUB}	Did not advance					

== Judo ==
Afghanistan put up 4 men's judokas at the Games.

Key:

- 1st number — Ippon
- 2nd number — Waza-ari
- s — Shido

Men

Athlete	Event	Round of 32	Round of 16	Quarterfinals	Semifinals	Repechage	Final / BM	Rank
Athlete	Event	Opposition Result	Opposition Result	Opposition Result	Opposition Result	Opposition Result	Opposition Result	Rank
Mod Reshad Aryan	–73 kg	Nguyễn TC (VIE); L 00–11	Did not advance					
Moh Zaher Sarwari	–81 kg	H Al-Jarrah (YEM); W 10–00	T Sakaki (JPN); L 00–10	Did not advance				
Mod Ismail Kakar	–90 kg	Bye	G Altanbagana (MGL); L 00s1–10	Did not advance				
Asadullah Tajik	–100 kg	Lu G-z (TPE); L 01–10	Did not advance					

== Karate ==
Afghanistan entered the karate competition with 6 athletes (4 men's and 2 women's).

== Kurash ==
Men

Athlete	Event	Round of 32	Round of 16	Quarterfinal	Semifinal	Final	
Athlete	Event	Opposition Score	Opposition Score	Opposition Score	Opposition Score	Opposition Score	Rank
Merajuddin Chakmar	–66 kg	M Orazow (TKM); L 000−010	Did not advance				
Shuaib Yuosuf	–66 kg	M Eraliev (KGZ); W 101−000	N Aldaberganov (KAZ); W 010−000	R Buriev (UZB); L 000−100	Did not advance		
Mohammad Arif Malikyar	–81 kg	SE Uulu (KGZ); L 000−010	Did not advance				
Besmilah Mohammadi	–81 kg	M Dagvadorj (MGL); W 100−000	K Ardiarta (INA); W 100−000	O Tiztak (IRI); L 002−012	Did not advance		
Shirzad Azizi	–90 kg	Bye	M Malekmohammadi (IRI); W 100−010	S Jandreev (UZB); L 000−110	Did not advance		
Ajmal Ishaqzai	–90 kg	Y Muzapparov (KAZ); L 001−112	Did not advance				
Abdul Basir Rahmani	+90 kg	M Ridha (IRQ); W 101−000	B Sugara (INA); W 101−000	N Turaev (UZB); L 000−101	Did not advance		
Mansour Sarwari	+90 kg	MA Zakeri (IRI); W 014−010	B Nurlanuly (KAZ); W 100−000	D Taganow (TKM); W 011−002	M Khisomiddinov (UZB); L 000−112	Did not advance	3rd place, bronze medalist(s)

Women

Athlete	Event	Round of 32	Round of 16	Quarterfinal	Semifinal	Final	
Athlete	Event	Opposition Score	Opposition Score	Opposition Score	Opposition Score	Opposition Score	Rank
Nafisa Ahmadi	–63 kg	Bye	D Shermetova (UZB); L 000−100	Did not advance			
Ramzia Saidi	–63 kg	M Abdumalikova (UZB); L 000−100	Did not advance				

== Paragliding ==
Men

Athlete	Event	Round										Total	Rank
Athlete	Event	1	2	3	4	5	6	7	8	9	10	Total	Rank
Maseehullah Khan	Individual accuracy	~~500~~	500	1	500	236	335	500	500	500	3	3075	30
Navid Popal	Individual accuracy	8	95	~~500~~	193	500	81	383	41	183	349	1833	25
Maseehullah Khan; Navid Popal	Team accuracy	2008	2095	2001	2193	2236	1916	—				12449	14

Women

Athlete	Event	Round										Total	Rank
Athlete	Event	1	2	3	4	5	6	7	8	9	10	Total	Rank
Faride Hezare	Individual accuracy	~~500~~	500	500	500	500	500	500	500	500	500	4500	18
Lida Hozoori	Individual accuracy	383	~~500~~	500	500	125	500	500	500	500	500	4008	17
Faride Hezare; Lida Hozoori	Team accuracy	1383	1500	1500	1500	1125	1500	—				8508	9

== Rugby sevens ==
Afghanistan rugby sevens men's team drawn in the group C at the Games.

Team	Event	Preliminary	Standing	Classification (Pl.)	Rank	Quarterfinal	Semifinal / Pl.	Final / BM / Pl.	
Team	Event	Opposition Score	Standing	Opposition Score	Rank	Opposition Score	Opposition Score	Opposition Score	Rank
Afghanistan men's	Men's tournament	Group C South Korea: L 5–42; United Arab Emirates: W 36–0; Sri Lanka: L 0–36	3	United Arab Emirates: W 50–0; Pakistan: W 15–7; Indonesia: W 29–12	9	Did not advance			

=== Men's tournament ===
Squad

The following is the Afghanistan squad in the men's rugby sevens tournament of the 2018 Asian Games.

Head coach: Haris Rahamni

- Mohammad Asghar Azizi
- Abdul Bari Gazang
- Mohammad Moosa Hashimi
- Javed Rahmani
- Mustafa Sayed
- Naib Shah Shirzad
- Sayear Slaimankhel
- Zakir Slaimankhel
- Omar Slaimankhel
- Sabir Slaimankhel
- Zahidullah Slaimankhel
- M Mussa Wardak

Group C

Pos	Team	Pld	W	D	L	PF	PA	PD	Pts	Qualification
1	South Korea	3	3	0	0	124	31	+93	9	Quarterfinals
2	Sri Lanka	3	2	0	1	130	31	+99	7	Quarterfinals
3	Afghanistan	3	1	0	2	41	78	−37	5	Ranking round 9–12
4	United Arab Emirates	3	0	0	3	0	155	−155	3	Ranking round 9–12

Source: Results

30 August
14:18

South Korea	42–5	Afghanistan
Try: Chang 1' c Han 5' c Kim J.M. 8' c Jang S. 10' c Lee 12' c Hwang 14+' c Con: Lee (5/5); Kim S. (1/1)		Try: Zak. Slaimankhel 7' m Con: O. Slaimankhel (0/1)

Gelora Bung Karno Rugby Field, Jakarta
Referee: Noriaki Hashimoto (Japan)

30 August
17:36

United Arab Emirates	0–36	Afghanistan
		Try: Gazang (2) 2' m, 7' c Zak. Slaimankhel 3' m Sayed 5' m O. Slaimankhel 12' c Azizi 14' c Con: Gazang (0/1); O. Slaimankhel (3/5)

Gelora Bung Karno Rugby Field, Jakarta
Referee: Patrick Kwok (Hong Kong)

31 August
14:18

Sri Lanka	36–0	Afghanistan
Try: Sooriyarachchi (2) 3' c, 13' m Sooriyabandara (2) 6' c, 14+' c Perera 10' m Raffaideen 11' m Con: Sooriyabandara (2/3); Sooriyarachchi (1/1); Ratwatte (0/2)

Gelora Bung Karno Rugby Field, Jakarta
Referee: Craig Chan (Canada)

Classification round (9–12)

Pos	Team	Pld	W	D	L	PF	PA	PD	Pts
1	Afghanistan	3	3	0	0	94	19	+75	9
2	Pakistan	3	2	0	1	102	20	+82	7
3	Indonesia	3	1	0	2	65	55	+10	5
4	United Arab Emirates	3	0	0	3	5	172	−167	3

Source: Results

31 August
16:30

Afghanistan	50–0	United Arab Emirates
Try: O. Slaimankhel (3) 2' c, 6' c, 9' m Zak. Slaimankhel (2) 3' c, 7+' c Gazang 5' c Rahmani 11' m Hashimi 13' m Con: O. Slaimankhel (5/7); Hashimi (0/1)

Gelora Bung Karno Rugby Field, Jakarta
Referee: Aaqil Jamaldeen (Sri Lanka)

1 September
11:00

Afghanistan	15–7	Pakistan
Try: O. Slaimankhel (2) 4' m, 13' m Gazang 10' m Con: O. Slaimankhel (0/3)		Try: Bhatti 12' c Con: Akram (1/1)

Gelora Bung Karno Rugby Field, Jakarta
Referee: Charlie Brown (Ireland)

1 September
18:02

Afghanistan	29–12	Indonesia
Try: O. Slaimankhel 1' c Gazang (3) 4' m, 7' m, 14' m Zak. Slaimankhel 7+' c Con: O. Slaimankhel (1/3); Say. Slaimankhel (1/1); Azizi (0/1)		Try: Nugroho 10' c Oloan 11' m Con: Oloan (1/2)

Gelora Bung Karno Rugby Field, Jakarta
Referee: Charlie Brown (Ireland)

== Sambo ==
Key:

- SU – Won by submission.

Athlete	Event	Round of 32	Round of 16	Quarterfinal	Semifinal	Repechage 1	Repechage 2	Repechage final	Final / BM	
Athlete	Event	Opposition Result	Opposition Result	Opposition Result	Opposition Result	Opposition Result	Opposition Result	Opposition Result	Opposition Result	Rank
Mansour Sarwari	Men's 90 kg	T Tampapanna (THA); WO	Did not advance							

== Swimming ==
Afghanistan National Swimming Federation entered one swimmer to compete at the Games.

Men

Athlete	Event	Heats		Final	
Athlete	Event	Time	Rank	Time	Rank
Ali Asghar Nazari	50 m freestyle	29.34	51	Did not advance	
Ali Asghar Nazari	50 m butterfly	30.22	40	Did not advance	

== Taekwondo ==
Kyorugi

Athlete	Event	Round of 32	Round of 16	Quarterfinal	Semifinal	Final	
Athlete	Event	Opposition Score	Opposition Score	Opposition Score	Opposition Score	Opposition Score	Rank
Mohsen Rezaee	Men's −58 kg	Zaw Linn Htet (MYA); W 36–7	Yeldos Yskak (KAZ); L 40–46	Did not advance			
Ahmad Ali Bakhshi	Men's −63 kg	Bir Bahadur Mahara (NEP); L 13–24	Did not advance				
Sharif Muradi	Men's −68 kg	Khojiakbar Zokirov (UZB); L 6–21	Did not advance				
Ramesh Hussaini	Men's −80 kg	Bye	Bhupen Shrestha (NEP); W 27–7	Nikita Rafalovich (UZB); L 0–11	Did not advance		

== Volleyball ==
=== Beach volleyball ===
Athlete	Event	Preliminary		Round of 16	Quarterfinals	Semifinals	Final / BM	
Athlete	Event	Oppositions Scores	Rank	Opposition Score	Opposition Score	Opposition Score	Opposition Score	Rank
Ozair Mohammad Asifi; Mohib Jan Ahmadi	Men's tournament	Rachmawan – Ashfiya (INA): L 0–2; Hsieh – Wang (TPE): L 0–2; Al-Housni – Al Shereiqi (OMA): L 0–2	4	Did not advance				
Obaidullah Alikhail; Najibullah Mayar	Men's tournament	Wu – Aboduhalikejiang (CHN): L 0–2; Pham – Nguyen (VIE): L 0–2; Ageba – Shiratori (JPN): L 0–2	4	Did not advance				

== Weightlifting ==
Men

Athlete	Event	Snatch		Clean & jerk		Total	Rank
Athlete	Event	Result	Rank	Result	Rank	Total	Rank
Zubair Nazari	−77 kg	100	19	120	17	220	17
Mirwais Raziqi	−94 kg	113	10	155	9	268	9

== Wrestling ==
Key:

- F – Victory by fall.
- PP – Decision by points – the loser with technical points.
- PO – Decision by points – the loser without technical points.
- ST – Great superiority – the loser without technical points and a margin of victory of at least 8 (Greco-Roman) or 10 (freestyle) points.

Men's freestyle

Athlete	Event	Qualification	Round of 16	Quarterfinal	Semifinal	Repechage 1	Repechage 2	Final / BM	
Athlete	Event	Opposition Result	Opposition Result	Opposition Result	Opposition Result	Opposition Result	Opposition Result	Opposition Result	Rank
Hamidullah Abdullah	−57 kg	Bye	Z Ismailov (KAZ); L 0–10	Did not advance					15
Malik Jan Sadeed	−65 kg	A Osmonov (KGZ); L 2–13	Did not advance						17
Abdul Ghafar Qaderi	−74 kg	Bye	R Dermawan (INA); W 6^{F}–4	A Batirov (BRN); L 5–15	Did not advance				8
Abdul Haia Faqiri	−86 kg	Bye	S R Ray (BAN); W 11–0	Davlumbayev (KAZ); L 0–3^{F}	Did not advance				9
Noor Ahmad Ahmadi	−97 kg	—	Iskandari (TJK); WO	M Musaev (KGZ); L 3–6	Did not advance	S Saparow (TKM); W 17–6	—	Kim J-g (KOR); L 0–3	5
Sayed Khalid Hashemi	−125 kg	—	T Raza (PAK); L 2–11^{F}	Did not advance			—	Did not advance	9

== Wushu ==
Taolu

Athlete	Event	Event 1		Event 2		Total	Rank
Athlete	Event	Result	Rank	Result	Rank	Total	Rank
Golab Shah Omari	Men's changquan	8.09	15	—		8.09	15
Jamshid Ebram	Men's nanquan and nangun	7.87	22	7.78	22	15.65	22

Sanda

Athlete	Event	Round of 32	Round of 16	Quarterfinal	Semifinal	Final	
Athlete	Event	Opposition Score	Opposition Score	Opposition Score	Opposition Score	Opposition Score	Rank
Naweed Sudiqi	Men's –60 kg	Bye	Wang XT (CHN); L 0–2	Did not advance			
Khalid Hotak	men's –65 kg	—	M A Shah (PAK); W 2–0	D Khieosavath (LAO); W 2–0	Li MF (CHN); L 0–2	Did not advance	3rd place, bronze medalist(s)
Nasratullah Habibi	Men's –70 kg	—	P Riyaya (INA); L 0–2	Did not advance			

Key: * TV – Technical victory.

== See also ==
- Afghanistan at the 2018 Asian Para Games
