= Narendra Giri =

Indian Hindu leader (1961–2021)

Mahant Narendra Giri
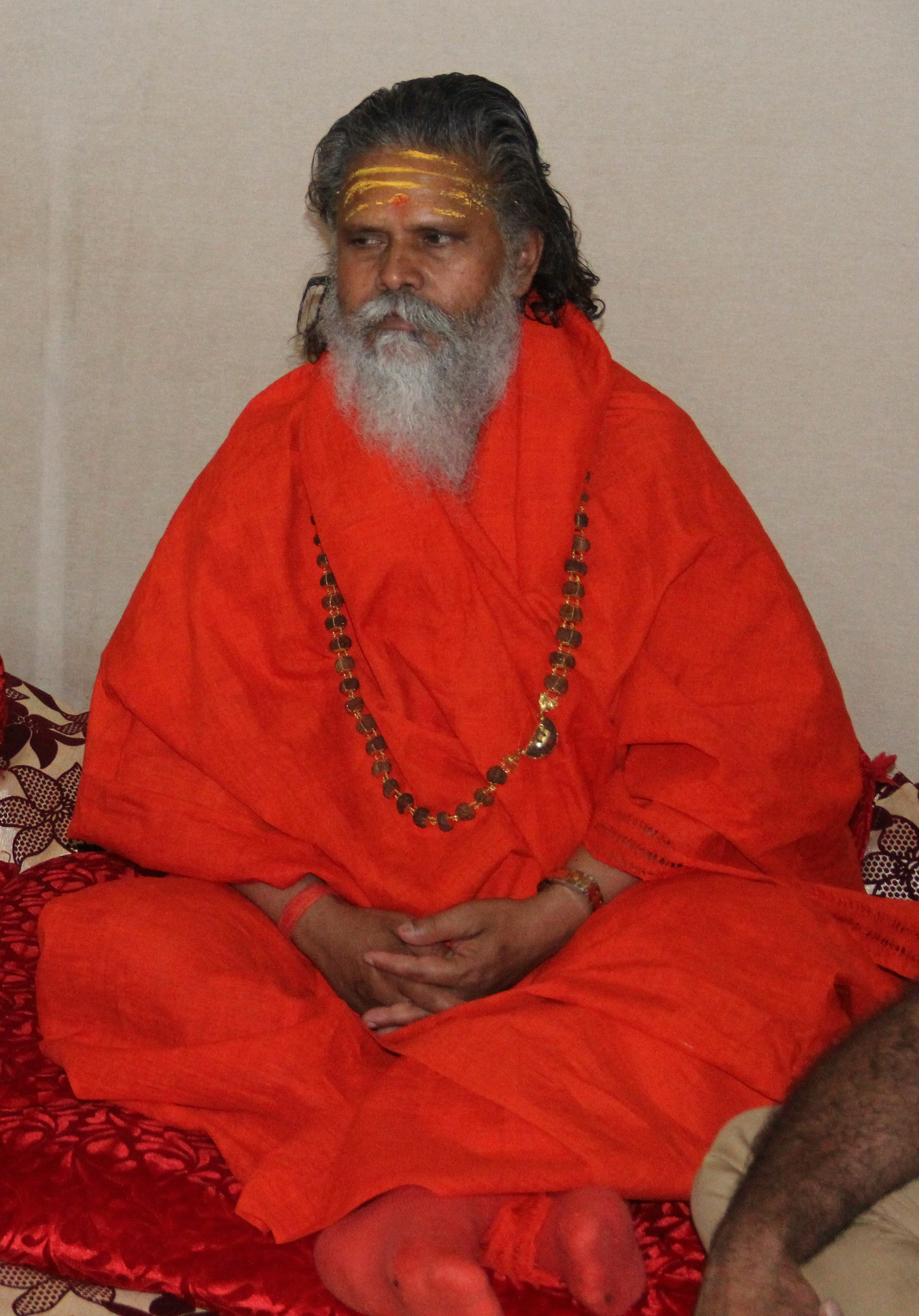
- Narendra Giri in 2016

Personal life
- Born: Rajendra Singh; 1961 Bibipur, Saidabad, Allahabad, India
- Died: 20 September 2021 (aged 59–60) Prayagraj, Uttar Pradesh, India

Religious life
- Religion: Hinduism
- Initiation: 1985 by Divyanand Giri

Religious career
- Teacher: Mahant Balwant Giri; Divyanand Giri
- Based in: Prayagraj, Uttar Pradesh
- Initiated: Sannyasa

Mahant Narendra Giri (born 1961 - death 2021) was an Indian Hindu leader from Allahabad, Uttar Pradesh. He served as the President of Akhil Bharatiya Akhara Parishad, the largest organized body of Hindu seers and ascetics in India, for two consecutive terms from 2014 until his death. Giri was the head of Baghambari Math, a more than 400-year-old Hindu monastery, since 2004. He was the chief priest (Mahant) of Allahabad's Bada Hanuman Temple, one of India's most-visited temples, which is also administered by Baghambari Math. Giri died by suicide at his residence (Baghambari Math) in Prayagraj on 20 September 2021. His death case is being investigated by the CBI.

== Early life ==
He was born in 1961 in a village called Bibipur, in the Saidabad town of Prayagraj. He was a native of Chhatauna village of Sarai Mamrej in Gangapar area in Allahabad. His real name was Rajendra Singh. His father Bhanu Pratap Singh was a member of the Rashtriya Swayamsevak Sangh. He did his education from a local school called Babu Sarju Prasad Singh Inter College. He left his home in 1983 at 21.

== Career ==
He was the disciple of Divyanand Giri of Niranjani Akhara, who initiated the sannyas to Narendra Giri in 1985 and gave him the name Narendra Giri. He hails from Niranjani Akhara. He was in Haridwar, Uttar Pradesh, in the early years of his life. He received deeksha (initiation) from his guru Mahant Balwant Giri, who also taught the entire initiation and Sannyasa tradition. After former chief of Baghambari Math, Balwant Giri's death, Narendra succeeded as the peethadheeshwar (chief) of Baghambari Math and mahant of Bade Hanuman Mandir in 2004. A fellow ascetic challenged his ascension as head of Math Baghambari Gaddi because he originally belonged to the Puri and not the Giri order of the Daśanāmi Sampradaya. That time, Narendra Giri and his followers confronted the challenger.

In 2014, Narendra was elected as the President of Akhil Bharatiya Akhara Parishad at the Nashik Kumbh. He also served as the secretary of the Niranjani Akhara.

In 2018, under his presidency of ABAP, Giri came into the limelight when he released the list of fake saints, which included Asaram, Radhe Maa, Nirmal Baba, Swami Aseemanand and Gurmeet Ram Rahim Singh, among others.

In October 2019, he was re-elected as Akhil Bharatiya Akhara Parishad president.

In 2020, he chaired a meeting of the Akhada Parishad after the 2019 Supreme Court verdict on the Ayodhya dispute, where he passed a resolution declaring they would launch a campaign with the Ayodhya Ram Janmabhoomi movement to 'free the Hindu temples' in Varanasi and Mathura.

== Controversies ==
In May 2019, he lashed out at Baba Ramdev and Sri Ravi Shankar for allegedly disrespecting the saint tradition and called them traders who misused the saintly apparel.

In 2019, Giri supported Chinmayanand, a former Union minister and BJP politician who was arrested in a sexual harassment case, but a month later, in September 2019, he criticized Chinmayanand for his actions. Apparently, he also expelled Chinmayanand from the Hindu sadhu community. However, he took a u-turn and extended his support to Chinmayanand and claimed Chinmayanand was falsely implicated in the sexual harassment charges.

In 2019, he was accused in connection with the suicide of Ashish Giri, a seer from Niranjani Akhara who died in mysterious circumstances. After police investigation, he was given a clean chit.

In May 2021, Narendra Giri had a fallout with his disciple Anand Giri, who was also a former priest of Bade Hanuman Temple. After the fallout, Anand was expelled from Baghambari Math and Niranjani Akhara. Narendra Giri accused Anand Giri of keeping a relationship with his family in violation of the set norms of conduct for sanyasis and was also accused of indulging in financial irregularities associated with the temple fund. In return, Narendra Giri was accused by Anand Giri of selling the properties of the Baghambari Math and misappropriating cash and also reached the Prime Minister's Office and Chief Minister of Uttar Pradesh with his complaint against Narendra Giri. Later, within a few days, Anand apologized to Giri by holding his feet and sought forgiveness from him. After which, his expulsion was lifted.

== Death ==
On 20 September 2021, he was found dead, hanging from the ceiling fan in his room in Baghambari Math, Allahabad. A suicide note was found, according to police, in which Narendra Giri blamed his disciple Anand Giri and others. Uttar Pradesh chief minister Yogi Adityanath ordered a Central Bureau of Investigation (CBI) inquiry. Anand Giri and two others were arrested on charges of abetment to the suicide of Narendra Giri.

The autopsy report indicated death by asphyxia due to hanging. Many political leaders, including Prime Minister Narendra Modi, Uttar Pradesh Chief Minister Yogi Adityanath, and former UP CM Akhilesh Yadav, condoled Narendra Giri's death.
