= Paragliding at the 2018 Asian Games – Men's team accuracy =

Men's team accuracy at the 2018 Asian Games
- Venue: Gunung Mas
- Date: 20–22 August 2018
- Competitors: 66 from 15 nations

Medalists
gold medal	Indonesia; Aris Apriansyah, Joni Efendi, Jafro Megawanto, Hening Paradigma, Roni Pratama
silver medal	South Korea; Kim Jin-oh, Lee Chang-min, Lee Chul-soo, Lee Seong-min, Lim Moon-seob
bronze medal	Thailand; Sarayut Chinpongsatorn, Tanapat Luangiam, Mongkut Preecha, Jirasak Witeetham, Nithat Yangjui

The men's team accuracy competition at the 2018 Asian Games in Puncak, Bogor Regency, Indonesia was held from 20 August to 22 August at the Gunung Mas.

If any team had less than five competitors, then a maximum score of 500 was awarded to the team for each task for each of the scores for which there is no competitor.

== Schedule ==
All times are Western Indonesia Time (UTC+07:00)

Date	Time	Event
Monday, 20 August 2018	08:00	Round 1
Monday, 20 August 2018	11:00	Round 2
Tuesday, 21 August 2018	08:00	Round 3
Tuesday, 21 August 2018	11:00	Round 4
Tuesday, 21 August 2018	14:00	Round 5
Wednesday, 22 August 2018	08:00	Round 6

== Results ==
Rank	Team	Round						Total
Rank	Team	1	2	3	4	5	6	Total
1st place, gold medalist(s)	Indonesia (INA)	315	272	70	288	64	95	1104
	Aris Apriansyah	98	1	7	201	2	0	309
	Joni Efendi	155	135	6	77	2	11	386
	Jafro Megawanto	3	6	52	0	2	7	70
	Hening Paradigma	16	71	3	9	54	4	157
	Roni Pratama	43	59	2	1	4	73	182
2nd place, silver medalist(s)	South Korea (KOR)	622	841	81	181	24	22	1771
	Kim Jin-oh	500	77	69	4	1	13	664
	Lee Chang-min	6	3	3	1	5	0	18
	Lee Chul-soo	87	192	4	6	14	4	307
	Lee Seong-min	19	333	5	157	2	4	520
	Lim Moon-seob	10	236	0	13	2	1	262
3rd place, bronze medalist(s)	Thailand (THA)	415	297	497	378	141	173	1901
	Sarayut Chinpongsatorn	44	21	259	8	121	5	458
	Tanapat Luangiam	200	0	226	39	4	1	470
	Mongkut Preecha	156	214	4	2	7	7	390
	Jirasak Witeetham	5	9	4	207	6	12	243
	Nithat Yangjui	10	53	4	122	3	148	340
4	Malaysia (MAS)	867	410	123	206	18	559	2183
	Faizal Abdul Wahab	102	31	7	13	1	5	159
	Irfan Esmadol	197	59	3	33	3	2	297
	Suhari Jainau	500	279	21	128	3	500	1431
	Nurhaqimy Ismail	46	37	50	22	4	9	168
	Mohd Nazri Sulaiman	22	4	42	10	7	43	128
5	China (CHN)	189	560	25	31	737	890	2432
	Ma Lei	10	3	2	20	0	2	37
	Wang Hongji	1	8	7	3	4	146	169
	Wang Jianwei	153	425	2	3	15	92	690
	Wu Yong	4	2	5	3	500	150	664
	Xiong Gang	21	122	9	2	218	500	872
6	Chinese Taipei (TPE)	400	693	425	870	691	855	3934
	Chen Keng-feng	239	224	83	500	8	45	1099
	Liu Cho-yi	139	209	16	118	132	153	767
	Tai Lei	13	56	202	227	15	500	1013
	Yang Yi-chun	7	22	123	21	36	0	209
	Yu Lin-qiao	2	182	1	4	500	157	846
7	Saudi Arabia (KSA)	728	784	115	874	279	1189	3969
	Abdulmotaaly Ahmed	7	175	35	352	13	51	633
	Aali Al-Maymuni	500	181	3	4	132	423	1243
	Ali Al-Nujaimi	5	22	34	500	87	500	1148
	Ali Al-Shamrani	30	63	6	13	31	193	336
	Ibrahim Bahri	186	343	37	5	16	22	609
8	Nepal (NEP)	734	937	347	1259	370	1007	4654
	Bimal Adhikari	201	500	44	14	186	140	1085
	Bijay Gautam	9	13	28	238	122	78	488
	Sushil Gurung	500	113	83	500	40	277	1513
	Yukesh Gurung	16	8	3	500	9	500	1036
	Bishal Thapa	8	303	189	7	13	12	532
9	Japan (JPN)	870	1133	146	466	1373	981	4969
	Yoshiaki Hirokawa	13	500	20	5	3	31	572
	Takuo Iwasaki	56	183	10	53	364	204	870
	Taro Kamiyama	281	259	43	253	500	500	1836
	Yoshiki Kuremoto	20	169	9	1	6	206	411
	Yoshiaki Nakagawa	500	22	64	154	500	40	1280
10	Iran (IRI)	1075	1262	1240	1097	1865	1476	8015
	Hossein Abbasgholizadeh	21	13	7	16	147	0	204
	Alireza Amidi	2	155	3	76	218	469	923
	Mahmoud Shirazinia	52	94	230	5	500	7	888
11	Mongolia (MGL)	1596	1094	1404	2156	896	1818	8964
	Khadkhüügiin Ariunbat	50	20	1	422	59	8	560
	Alzakhgüin Batdavaa	500	62	168	234	112	404	1480
	Damdinsürengiin Battsengel	500	500	500	500	213	406	2619
	Pürevdelgeriin Bold	46	12	235	500	12	500	1305
12	Laos (LAO)	1747	1833	1053	2296	1414	1503	9846
	Kingphet Bannavong	500	500	2	500	253	500	2255
	Vilasith Savath	5	142	33	500	500	500	1680
	Kitsada Siharath	500	500	500	500	362	500	2862
	Bounpathom Souvannamethy	242	500	18	500	102	3	1365
	Paseuthsack Vannasouk	500	191	500	296	197	0	1684
13	Qatar (QAT)	2007	2076	2003	1874	1869	2020	11849
	Abdullatif Al-Qahtani	500	500	500	366	22	500	2388
	Ali Al-Yafei	7	76	3	8	347	20	461
14	Afghanistan (AFG)	2008	2095	2001	2193	2236	1916	12449
	Maseehullah Khan	500	500	1	500	236	335	2072
	Navid Popal	8	95	500	193	500	81	1377
15	Kuwait (KUW)	1885	2500	2101	2500	2500	1950	13436
	Taleb Al-Atar	120	500	500	500	500	57	2177
	Mohammad Al-Hadad	500	500	500	500	500	500	3000
	Abdulaziz Al-Hasawi	500	500	500	500	500	500	3000
	Easa Al-Qallaf	265	500	101	500	500	500	2366
	Nayef Beijaan	500	500	500	500	500	393	2893
