= Wushu at the 2018 Asian Games – Men's sanda 65 kg =

Men's sanda 65 kg at the 2018 Asian Games
- Venue: Jakarta International Expo
- Dates: 19–23 August 2018
- Competitors: 14 from 14 nations

Medalists
gold medal	Li Mengfan	China
silver medal	Foroud Zafari	Iran
bronze medal	Narender Grewal	India
bronze medal	Khalid Hotak	Afghanistan

The men's sanda 65 kilograms competition at the 2018 Asian Games in Jakarta, Indonesia was held from 20 August to 23 August at the JIExpo Kemayoran Hall B3.

A total of fourteen competitors from fourteen countries competed in this event, limited to fighters whose body weight was less than 65 kilograms.

Li Mengfan from China won the gold medal after beating Faroud Zafari of Iran in gold medal bout 2–0, Li won both rounds by the same score of 5–0

The bronze medal was shared by Narender Grewal from India and Khalid Hotak of Afghanistan. Hoàng Văn Cao from Vietnam, Akmal Rakhimov from Uzbekistan, Damxoumphone Khieosavath from Laos and Park Seung-mo from South Korea shared the fifth place. Athletes from Indonesia, Kyrgyzstan, Philippines, Pakistan, Nepal and Thailand lost in the first round and didn't advance.

== Schedule ==
All times are Western Indonesia Time (UTC+07:00)

Date	Time	Event
Monday, 20 August 2018	19:00	Round of 16
Tuesday, 21 August 2018	19:00	Quarterfinals
Wednesday, 22 August 2018	19:00	Semifinals
Thursday, 23 August 2018	10:00	Final

== Results ==
Legend

- WO — Won by walkover

Round of 16
Foroud Zafari (IRI)	2
Yudi Cahyadi (INA)	0
Kanatbek Abduganiev (KGZ)	0
Akmal Rakhimov (UZB)	2
Narender Grewal (IND)	2
Clemente Tabugara (PHI)	1
Maratab Ali Shah (PAK)	0
Khalid Hotak (AFG)	2
Damxoumphone Khieosavath (LAO)	WO
Birman Lama (NEP)
Charuwat Khunphet (THA)	0
Park Seung-mo (KOR)	2

Quarterfinals
Hoàng Văn Cao (VIE)	0
Foroud Zafari (IRI)	2
Akmal Rakhimov (UZB)	0
Narender Grewal (IND)	2
Khalid Hotak (AFG)	2
Damxoumphone Khieosavath (LAO)	0
Park Seung-mo (KOR)	1
Li Mengfan (CHN)	2

Semifinals
Foroud Zafari (IRI)	2
Narender Grewal (IND)	0
Khalid Hotak (AFG)	0
Li Mengfan (CHN)	2

Final
Foroud Zafari (IRI)	0
Li Mengfan (CHN)	2
