= Paragliding at the 2018 Asian Games – Women's individual accuracy =

Asian Games event

Women's individual accuracy at the 2018 Asian Games
- Venue: Gunung Mas
- Date: 20–23 August 2018
- Competitors: 18 from 10 nations

Medalists
gold medal	Nunnapat Phuchong	Thailand
silver medal	Lee Da-gyeom	South Korea
bronze medal	Rika Wijayanti	Indonesia

The women's individual accuracy competition at the 2018 Asian Games in Puncak, Bogor Regency, Indonesia was held from 20 August to 23 August at the Gunung Mas.

== Schedule ==
All times are Western Indonesia Time (UTC+07:00)

Date	Time	Event
Monday, 20 August 2018	08:00	Round 1
Monday, 20 August 2018	11:00	Round 2
Tuesday, 21 August 2018	08:00	Round 3
Tuesday, 21 August 2018	11:00	Round 4
Tuesday, 21 August 2018	14:00	Round 5
Wednesday, 22 August 2018	08:00	Round 6
Wednesday, 22 August 2018	10:00	Round 7
Wednesday, 22 August 2018	11:00	Round 8
Wednesday, 22 August 2018	16:00	Round 9
Thursday, 23 August 2018	11:00	Round 10

== Results ==
Rank	Athlete	Round										Total
Rank	Athlete	1	2	3	4	5	6	7	8	9	10	Total
1st place, gold medalist(s)	Nunnapat Phuchong (THA)	11	1	1	19	12	4	2	5	22	~~22~~	77
2nd place, silver medalist(s)	Lee Da-gyeom (KOR)	1	7	0	12	61	~~88~~	4	2	7	4	98
3rd place, bronze medalist(s)	Rika Wijayanti (INA)	16	2	1	~~169~~	5	4	1	84	1	6	120
4	Chantika Chaisanuk (THA)	22	123	~~500~~	27	10	61	197	194	148	21	803
5	Ike Ayu Wulandari (INA)	7	177	139	57	170	72	~~500~~	2	26	306	956
6	Jang Woo-young (KOR)	~~500~~	204	17	479	92	204	7	22	36	6	1067
7	Long Jingwen (CHN)	~~500~~	500	2	419	5	0	2	2	2	500	1432
8	Keiko Hiraki (JPN)	~~500~~	500	468	16	21	132	208	21	65	19	1450
9	Goh Soo Fen (SGP)	~~500~~	500	43	17	13	2	500	19	57	500	1651
10	Li Chennan (CHN)	~~500~~	500	252	55	111	500	488	2	59	1	1968
11	Asjanita Aini (MAS)	496	~~500~~	53	500	269	472	215	55	73	179	2312
12	Atsuko Yamashita (JPN)	60	~~500~~	500	500	76	118	500	128	500	6	2388
13	Sharifah Nadiah Wafa (MAS)	17	~~500~~	500	219	500	237	228	405	379	7	2492
14	Trisha Shrestha Bomjan (NEP)	151	129	395	~~500~~	330	161	500	500	500	312	2978
15	Prativa Bhujel (NEP)	~~500~~	117	500	500	359	500	500	9	500	252	3237
16	Tümenbayaryn Chuluunbat (MGL)	274	159	~~500~~	500	500	500	500	291	500	89	3313
17	Lida Hozoori (AFG)	383	~~500~~	500	500	125	500	500	500	500	500	4008
18	Faride Hezare (AFG)	~~500~~	500	500	500	500	500	500	500	500	500	4500
