= Paragliding at the 2018 Asian Games – Men's individual accuracy =

Men's individual accuracy at the 2018 Asian Games
- Venue: Gunung Mas
- Date: 20–23 August 2018
- Competitors: 33 from 17 nations

Medalists
gold medal	Jafro Megawanto	Indonesia
silver medal	Jirasak Witeetham	Thailand
bronze medal	Lee Chul-soo	South Korea

The men's individual accuracy competition at the 2018 Asian Games in Puncak, Bogor Regency, Indonesia was held from 20 August to 23 August at the Gunung Mas.

== Schedule ==
All times are Western Indonesia Time (UTC+07:00)

Date	Time	Event
Monday, 20 August 2018	08:00	Round 1
Monday, 20 August 2018	11:00	Round 2
Tuesday, 21 August 2018	08:00	Round 3
Tuesday, 21 August 2018	11:00	Round 4
Tuesday, 21 August 2018	14:00	Round 5
Wednesday, 22 August 2018	08:00	Round 6
Wednesday, 22 August 2018	10:00	Round 7
Wednesday, 22 August 2018	11:00	Round 8
Wednesday, 22 August 2018	16:00	Round 9
Thursday, 23 August 2018	11:00	Round 10

== Results ==
Rank	Athlete	Round										Total
Rank	Athlete	1	2	3	4	5	6	7	8	9	10	Total
1st place, gold medalist(s)	Jafro Megawanto (INA)	3	6	~~52~~	0	2	7	3	2	2	2	27
2nd place, silver medalist(s)	Jirasak Witeetham (THA)	5	9	4	~~207~~	6	12	8	3	0	0	47
3rd place, bronze medalist(s)	Lee Chul-soo (KOR)	87	~~192~~	4	6	14	4	3	1	8	1	128
4	Faizal Abdul Wahab (MAS)	102	31	7	13	1	5	~~123~~	10	2	43	214
5	Joni Efendi (INA)	~~155~~	135	6	77	2	11	2	4	7	1	245
6	Yang Yi-chun (TPE)	7	22	123	21	36	0	93	7	~~309~~	7	316
7	Mohd Nazri Sulaiman (MAS)	22	4	42	10	7	43	57	179	~~223~~	3	367
8	Bijay Gautam (NEP)	9	13	28	~~238~~	122	78	21	4	22	86	383
9	Xiong Gang (CHN)	21	122	9	2	218	~~500~~	4	3	2	6	387
10	Tanapat Luangiam (THA)	200	0	~~226~~	39	4	1	3	166	2	3	418
11	Lee Seong-min (KOR)	19	~~333~~	5	157	2	4	1	13	209	17	427
12	Yoshiki Kuremoto (JPN)	20	169	9	1	6	206	~~244~~	13	2	134	560
13	Yu Lin-qiao (TPE)	2	182	1	4	~~500~~	157	1	174	88	41	650
14	Hossein Abbasgholizadeh (IRI)	21	13	7	16	147	0	~~500~~	500	11	1	716
15	Abdulmotaaly Ahmed (KSA)	7	175	35	352	13	51	~~500~~	17	73	81	804
16	Eric Yam (HKG)	4	49	87	255	179	10	~~500~~	9	193	29	815
17	Yoshiaki Hirokawa (JPN)	13	~~500~~	20	5	3	31	500	22	284	4	882
18	Khadkhüügiin Ariunbat (MGL)	50	20	1	422	59	8	198	~~500~~	12	150	920
19	Ali Al-Yafei (QAT)	7	76	3	8	347	20	~~500~~	10	500	17	988
20	Alireza Amidi (IRI)	2	155	3	76	218	469	0	~~500~~	6	90	1019
21	Ali Al-Nujaimi (KSA)	5	22	34	~~500~~	87	500	7	132	154	88	1029
22	Paseuthsack Vannasouk (LAO)	~~500~~	191	500	296	197	0	11	7	156	5	1363
23	Wong Pak Shing (HKG)	9	436	14	4	~~500~~	8	500	500	6	7	1484
24	Sushil Gurung (NEP)	~~500~~	113	83	500	40	277	125	1	500	2	1641
25	Navid Popal (AFG)	8	95	~~500~~	193	500	81	383	41	183	349	1833
26	Alzakhgüin Batdavaa (MGL)	~~500~~	62	168	234	112	404	228	21	117	500	1846
27	Bounpathom Souvannamethy (LAO)	242	~~500~~	18	500	102	3	500	500	202	30	2097
28	Wang Jianwei (CHN)	153	425	2	3	15	92	~~500~~	500	500	500	2190
29	Easa Al-Qallaf (KUW)	265	~~500~~	101	500	500	500	500	62	11	500	2939
30	Maseehullah Khan (AFG)	~~500~~	500	1	500	236	335	500	500	500	3	3075
31	Farman Ahmed (PAK)	~~500~~	500	18	22	500	500	500	500	199	500	3239
32	Taleb Al-Atar (KUW)	120	~~500~~	500	500	500	57	500	95	500	500	3272
33	Abdullatif Al-Qahtani (QAT)	~~500~~	500	500	366	22	500	500	500	22	500	3410
