= Paragliding at the 2018 Asian Games – Women's team cross-country =

Women's team cross-country at the 2018 Asian Games
- Venue: Gunung Mas
- Date: 25–29 August 2018
- Competitors: 24 from 10 nations

Medalists
gold medal	South Korea; Baek Jin-hee, Jang Woo-young, Lee Da-gyeom
silver medal	Japan; Keiko Hiraki, Nao Mochizuki, Atsuko Yamashita
bronze medal	Indonesia; Lis Andriana, Rika Wijayanti, Ike Ayu Wulandari

The women's team cross-country competition at the 2018 Asian Games in Puncak, Bogor Regency, Indonesia was held from 25 August to 29 August at the Gunung Mas.

== Schedule ==
All times are Western Indonesia Time (UTC+07:00)

Date	Time	Event
Saturday, 25 August 2018	10:00	Task 1
Sunday, 26 August 2018	10:00	Task 2
Monday, 27 August 2018	10:00	Task 3
Tuesday, 28 August 2018	10:00	Task 4
Wednesday, 29 August 2018	10:00	Task 5

== Results ==
Rank	Team	Task					Total
Rank	Team	1	2	3	4	5	Total
1st place, gold medalist(s)	South Korea (KOR)	1036	408	1052	1843	585	4924
	Baek Jin-hee	269	207	800	939	~~124~~	
	Jang Woo-young	767	201	~~202~~	~~120~~	124	
	Lee Da-gyeom	~~177~~	~~198~~	252	904	461	
2nd place, silver medalist(s)	Japan (JPN)	644	405	1891	1079	832	4851
	Keiko Hiraki	~~101~~	206	965	971	509	
	Nao Mochizuki	101	199	926	108	323	
	Atsuko Yamashita	543	~~0~~	~~0~~	~~0~~	~~0~~	
3rd place, bronze medalist(s)	Indonesia (INA)	479	503	509	800	248	2539
	Lis Andriana	186	~~157~~	~~238~~	~~113~~	124	
	Rika Wijayanti	293	190	239	137	124	
	Ike Ayu Wulandari	~~111~~	313	270	663	~~124~~	
4	Thailand (THA)	202	465	409	238	585	1899
	Chantika Chaisanuk	101	~~157~~	~~154~~	108	124	
	Nunnapat Phuchong	~~101~~	264	205	~~108~~	461	
	Narubhorn Wathaya	101	201	204	130	~~124~~	
5	Malaysia (MAS)	202	314	467	217	248	1448
	Asjanita Aini	101	157	313	109	~~124~~	
	Siti Sakinah Osman	~~0~~	~~0~~	~~0~~	~~0~~	124	
	Sharifah Nadiah Wafa	101	157	154	108	124	
6	Nepal (NEP)	285	353	308	216	248	1410
	Prativa Bhujel	101	196	154	108	124	
	Trisha Shrestha Bomjan	184	~~157~~	~~154~~	~~108~~	~~124~~	
	Sabita Tamang	~~101~~	157	154	108	124	
7	Singapore (SGP)	101	157	191	118	124	691
	Goh Soo Fen	101	157	191	118	124	
8	Mongolia (MGL)	101	157	154	108	124	644
	Tümenbayaryn Chuluunbat	101	157	154	108	124	
9	Hong Kong (HKG)	101	174	0	0	0	275
	Choi Lai Yin	101	174	0	0	0	
10	China (CHN)	0	0	0	0	0	0
	Li Chennan	0	~~0~~	~~0~~	~~0~~	~~0~~	
	Li Simin	0	0	0	0	0	
	Long Jingwen	~~0~~	0	0	0	0	
