= Paragliding at the 2018 Asian Games – Men's team cross-country =

Men's team cross-country at the 2018 Asian Games
- Venue: Gunung Mas
- Date: 25–29 August 2018
- Competitors: 43 from 10 nations

Medalists
gold medal	Japan; Yoshiaki Hirokawa, Takuo Iwasaki, Taro Kamiyama, Yoshiki Kuremoto, Yoshiaki Nakagawa
silver medal	Nepal; Bimal Adhikari, Bijay Gautam, Sushil Gurung, Yukesh Gurung, Bishal Thapa
bronze medal	Indonesia; Aris Apriansyah, Joni Efendi, Jafro Megawanto, Hening Paradigma, Roni Pratama

The men's team cross-country competition at the 2018 Asian Games in Puncak, Bogor Regency, Indonesia was held from 25 August to 29 August at the Gunung Mas.

== Schedule ==
All times are Western Indonesia Time (UTC+07:00)

Date	Time	Event
Saturday, 25 August 2018	10:00	Task 1
Sunday, 26 August 2018	10:00	Task 2
Monday, 27 August 2018	10:00	Task 3
Tuesday, 28 August 2018	10:00	Task 4
Wednesday, 29 August 2018	10:00	Task 5

== Results ==
Rank	Team	Task					Total
Rank	Team	1	2	3	4	5	Total
1st place, gold medalist(s)	Japan (JPN)	2024	741	3296	3273	2057	11391
	Yoshiaki Hirokawa	~~185~~	218	998	817	~~179~~	
	Takuo Iwasaki	1000	~~172~~	685	~~711~~	890	
	Taro Kamiyama	207	174	~~242~~	803	809	
	Yoshiki Kuremoto	211	176	896	869	179	
	Yoshiaki Nakagawa	606	173	717	784	179	
2nd place, silver medalist(s)	Nepal (NEP)	2255	694	2844	2774	2797	11364
	Bimal Adhikari	338	180	865	856	261	
	Bijay Gautam	453	174	246	~~166~~	858	
	Sushil Gurung	477	170	~~172~~	258	~~179~~	
	Yukesh Gurung	987	170	891	795	799	
	Bishal Thapa	~~211~~	~~162~~	842	865	879	
3rd place, bronze medalist(s)	Indonesia (INA)	2917	901	2490	1928	2637	10873
	Aris Apriansyah	~~190~~	226	~~188~~	~~90~~	296	
	Joni Efendi	487	322	525	153	772	
	Jafro Megawanto	987	~~170~~	732	117	~~179~~	
	Hening Paradigma	449	173	987	764	785	
	Roni Pratama	994	180	246	894	784	
4	South Korea (KOR)	2500	689	2619	2168	2187	10163
	Kim Jin-oh	618	171	910	~~160~~	775	
	Lee Chang-min	~~287~~	171	497	210	259	
	Lee Chul-soo	406	173	245	798	~~179~~	
	Lee Seong-min	476	~~169~~	~~119~~	990	376	
	Lim Moon-seob	1000	174	967	170	777	
5	Malaysia (MAS)	1167	827	1496	1224	1388	6102
	Faizal Abdul Wahab	116	163	601	163	851	
	Irfan Esmadol	351	354	530	162	179	
	Suhari Jainau	~~116~~	140	~~119~~	84	179	
	Nurhaqimy Ismail	584	170	246	815	~~179~~	
	Mohd Nazri Sulaiman	116	~~134~~	119	~~81~~	179	
6	Thailand (THA)	873	562	699	1085	1982	5201
	Sarayut Chinpongsatorn	305	134	242	159	740	
	Tanapat Luangiam	116	134	~~120~~	~~90~~	179	
	Mongkut Preecha	~~116~~	160	151	161	~~179~~	
	Jirasak Witeetham	336	~~134~~	155	661	884	
	Nithat Yangjui	116	134	151	104	179	
7	Hong Kong (HKG)	1181	678	1863	243	537	4502
	Chiu Ho Nam	~~116~~	161	928	~~0~~	0	
	Qian Mingwei	329	229	626	81	~~0~~	
	Vong Kam Meng	620	154	190	0	179	
	Wong Pak Shing	116	134	~~119~~	81	179	
	Eric Yam	116	~~134~~	119	81	179	
8	China (CHN)	348	536	476	324	0	1684
	Ma Lei	116	134	119	81	0	
	Wang Hongji	116	134	119	81	0	
	Wang Jianwei	~~0~~	~~0~~	~~0~~	~~0~~	~~0~~	
	Wu Yong	0	134	119	81	0	
	Xiong Gang	116	134	119	81	0	
9	Laos (LAO)	232	268	238	166	358	1262
	Kingphet Bannavong	116	134	119	85	179	
	Paseuthsack Vannasouk	116	134	119	81	179	
10	Mongolia (MGL)	116	134	119	81	179	629
	Pürevdelgeriin Bold	116	134	119	81	179	
