= Paragliding at the 2018 Asian Games – Women's team accuracy =

Women's team accuracy at the 2018 Asian Games
- Venue: Gunung Mas
- Date: 20–22 August 2018
- Competitors: 24 from 9 nations

Medalists
gold medal	Thailand; Chantika Chaisanuk, Nunnapat Phuchong, Narubhorn Wathaya
silver medal	Indonesia; Lis Andriana, Rika Wijayanti, Ike Ayu Wulandari
bronze medal	South Korea; Baek Jin-hee, Jang Woo-young, Lee Da-gyeom

The women's team accuracy competition at the 2018 Asian Games in Puncak, Bogor Regency, Indonesia was held from 20 August to 22 August at the Gunung Mas.

If any team had less than three competitors, then a maximum score of 500 was awarded to the team for each task for each of the scores for which there is no competitor.

== Schedule ==
All times are Western Indonesia Time (UTC+07:00)

Date	Time	Event
Monday, 20 August 2018	08:00	Round 1
Monday, 20 August 2018	11:00	Round 2
Tuesday, 21 August 2018	08:00	Round 3
Tuesday, 21 August 2018	11:00	Round 4
Tuesday, 21 August 2018	14:00	Round 5
Wednesday, 22 August 2018	08:00	Round 6

== Results ==
Rank	Team	Round						Total
Rank	Team	1	2	3	4	5	6	Total
1st place, gold medalist(s)	Thailand (THA)	115	624	683	53	25	545	2045
	Chantika Chaisanuk	22	123	500	27	10	61	743
	Nunnapat Phuchong	11	1	1	19	12	4	48
	Narubhorn Wathaya	82	500	182	7	3	480	1254
2nd place, silver medalist(s)	Indonesia (INA)	343	183	640	247	624	85	2122
	Lis Andriana	320	4	500	21	449	9	1303
	Rika Wijayanti	16	2	1	169	5	4	197
	Ike Ayu Wulandari	7	177	139	57	170	72	622
3rd place, bronze medalist(s)	South Korea (KOR)	502	218	517	585	240	301	2363
	Baek Jin-hee	1	7	500	94	87	9	698
	Jang Woo-young	500	204	17	479	92	204	1496
	Lee Da-gyeom	1	7	0	12	61	88	169
4	China (CHN)	1500	1004	255	974	173	505	4411
	Li Chennan	500	500	252	55	111	500	1918
	Li Simin	500	4	1	500	57	5	1067
	Long Jingwen	500	500	2	419	5	0	1426
5	Japan (JPN)	1060	1500	1016	1016	597	372	5561
	Keiko Hiraki	500	500	468	16	21	132	1637
	Nao Mochizuki	500	500	48	500	500	122	2170
	Atsuko Yamashita	60	500	500	500	76	118	1754
6	Malaysia (MAS)	700	1500	704	725	1269	1209	6107
	Asjanita Aini	496	500	53	500	269	472	2290
	Siti Sakinah Osman	187	500	151	6	500	500	1844
	Sharifah Nadiah Wafa	17	500	500	219	500	237	1973
7	Nepal (NEP)	912	336	1395	1500	1189	1161	6493
	Prativa Bhujel	500	117	500	500	359	500	2476
	Trisha Shrestha Bomjan	151	129	395	500	330	161	1666
	Sabita Tamang	261	90	500	500	500	500	2351
8	Singapore (SGP)	1500	1500	1043	1017	1013	1002	7075
	Goh Soo Fen	500	500	43	17	13	2	1075
9	Afghanistan (AFG)	1383	1500	1500	1500	1125	1500	8508
	Faride Hezare	500	500	500	500	500	500	3000
	Lida Hozoori	383	500	500	500	125	500	2508
