= List of Nepalese records in Olympic weightlifting =

The following are the national records in Olympic weightlifting in Nepal. Records are maintained in each weight class for the snatch lift, clean and jerk lift, and the total for both lifts by the Nepal Weight Lifting Association.

== Current records ==
=== Men ===
Event	Record	Athlete	Date	Meet	Place	Ref
55 kg
Snatch	80 kg	Mahato Tularam	5 December 2019	South Asian Games	Pokhara, Nepal	
Clean & Jerk	98 kg	Mahato Tularam	5 December 2019	South Asian Games	Pokhara, Nepal	
Total	178 kg	Mahato Tularam	5 December 2019	South Asian Games	Pokhara, Nepal	
61 kg
Snatch						
Clean & Jerk						
Total						
67 kg
Snatch	112 kg	Adhikari Kamal Bahadur	6 December 2019	South Asian Games	Pokhara, Nepal	
Clean & Jerk	140 kg	Adhikari Kamal Bahadur	6 December 2019	South Asian Games	Pokhara, Nepal	
Total	252 kg	Adhikari Kamal Bahadur	6 December 2019	South Asian Games	Pokhara, Nepal	
73 kg
Snatch	115 kg	K.C. Prakash	6 December 2019	South Asian Games	Pokhara, Nepal	
Clean & Jerk	150 kg	K.C. Prakash	6 December 2019	South Asian Games	Pokhara, Nepal	
Total	265 kg	K.C. Prakash	6 December 2019	South Asian Games	Pokhara, Nepal	
81 kg
Snatch	124 kg	Bikash Bhatt	10 September 2023	World Championships	Riyadh, Saudi Arabia	
Clean & Jerk	148 kg	Bikash Bhatt	10 September 2023	World Championships	Riyadh, Saudi Arabia	
Total	272 kg	Bikash Bhatt	10 September 2023	World Championships	Riyadh, Saudi Arabia	
89 kg
Snatch	124 kg	Bhatt Bikash	20 September 2022	National Games	Pokhara, Nepal	
Clean & Jerk	147 kg	Bhatt Bikash	20 September 2022	National Games	Pokhara, Nepal	
Total	271 kg	Bhatt Bikash	20 September 2022	National Games	Pokhara, Nepal	
96 kg
Snatch	133 kg	Vishal Sing Bist	5 October 2023	Asian Games	Hangzhou, China	
Clean & Jerk	168 kg	Vishal Sing Bist	5 October 2023	Asian Games	Hangzhou, China	
Total	301 kg	Vishal Sing Bist	5 October 2023	Asian Games	Hangzhou, China	
102 kg
Snatch	100 kg	Gurung Sandesh	7 December 2019	South Asian Games	Pokhara, Nepal	
Clean & Jerk	135 kg	Gurung Sandesh	7 December 2019	South Asian Games	Pokhara, Nepal	
Total	235 kg	Gurung Sandesh	7 December 2019	South Asian Games	Pokhara, Nepal	
109 kg
Snatch	128 kg	Sagar Bhandari	16 September 2023	World Championships	Riyadh, Saudi Arabia	
Clean & Jerk	163 kg	Sagar Bhandari	16 September 2023	World Championships	Riyadh, Saudi Arabia	
Total	291 kg	Sagar Bhandari	16 September 2023	World Championships	Riyadh, Saudi Arabia	
+109 kg
Snatch	134 kg	Sagar Bhandari	11 April 2024	World Cup	Phuket, Thailand	
Clean & Jerk	172 kg	Sagar Bhandari	11 April 2024	World Cup	Phuket, Thailand	
Total	306 kg	Sagar Bhandari	11 April 2024	World Cup	Phuket, Thailand	

=== Women ===
Event	Record	Athlete	Date	Meet	Place	Ref
45 kg
Snatch	57 kg	Rai Sangita	5 December 2019	South Asian Games	Pokhara, Nepal	
Clean and Jerk	70 kg	Rai Sangita	5 December 2019	South Asian Games	Pokhara, Nepal	
Total	127 kg	Rai Sangita	5 December 2019	South Asian Games	Pokhara, Nepal	
49 kg
Snatch	59 kg	Sangita Rai	13 August 2019	Nepal's Strongest Sunil Lal Joshi Memorial Weightlifting Championships	Kathmandu, Nepal	
Clean and Jerk	76 kg	Sangita Rai	13 August 2019	Nepal's Strongest Sunil Lal Joshi Memorial Weightlifting Championships	Kathmandu, Nepal	
Total	135 kg	Sangita Rai	13 August 2019	Nepal's Strongest Sunil Lal Joshi Memorial Weightlifting Championships	Kathmandu, Nepal	
55 kg
Snatch	70 kg	Sanju Chaudhary	22 April 2019	Asian Championships	Ningbo, China	
Clean and Jerk	90 kg	Sanju Chaudhary	22 April 2019	Asian Championships	Ningbo, China	
Total	160 kg	Sanju Chaudhary	22 April 2019	Asian Championships	Ningbo, China	
59 kg
Snatch	74 kg	Sanju Chaudhary	5 December 2019	South Asian Games	Pokhara, Nepal	
Clean & Jerk	97 kg	Sanju Chaudhary	5 December 2019	South Asian Games	Pokhara, Nepal	
Total	171 kg	Sanju Chaudhary	5 December 2019	South Asian Games	Pokhara, Nepal	
64 kg
Snatch	73 kg	Kamala Shrestha	20 April 2021	Asian Championships	Tashkent, Uzbekistan	
Clean and Jerk	93 kg	Kamala Shrestha	20 April 2021	Asian Championships	Tashkent, Uzbekistan	
Total	166 kg	Kamala Shrestha	20 April 2021	Asian Championships	Tashkent, Uzbekistan	
71 kg
Snatch	67 kg	Thapa Rajlaxmi	6 December 2019	South Asian Games	Pokhara, Nepal	
Clean and Jerk	83 kg	Thapa Rajlaxmi	6 December 2019	South Asian Games	Pokhara, Nepal	
Total	150 kg	Thapa Rajlaxmi	6 December 2019	South Asian Games	Pokhara, Nepal	
76 kg
Snatch	75 kg	Pun Tara Devi	7 December 2019	South Asian Games	Pokhara, Nepal	
Clean and Jerk	97 kg	Pun Tara Devi	7 December 2019	South Asian Games	Pokhara, Nepal	
Total	172 kg	Pun Tara Devi	7 December 2019	South Asian Games	Pokhara, Nepal	
81 kg
Snatch	60 kg	Ban Laxmi	7 December 2019	South Asian Games	Pokhara, Nepal	
Clean and Jerk	80 kg	Ban Laxmi	7 December 2019	South Asian Games	Pokhara, Nepal	
Total	140 kg	Ban Laxmi	7 December 2019	South Asian Games	Pokhara, Nepal	
87 kg
Snatch	60 kg	Kumal Mankumari	7 December 2019	South Asian Games	Pokhara, Nepal	
Clean and Jerk	76 kg	Kumal Mankumari	7 December 2019	South Asian Games	Pokhara, Nepal	
Total	136 kg	Kumal Mankumari	7 December 2019	South Asian Games	Pokhara, Nepal	
+87 kg
Snatch	60 kg	Rai Ashmita	7 December 2019	South Asian Games	Pokhara, Nepal	
Clean and Jerk	65 kg	Rai Ashmita	7 December 2019	South Asian Games	Pokhara, Nepal	
Total	125 kg	Rai Ashmita	7 December 2019	South Asian Games	Pokhara, Nepal	

== Historical records ==
=== Men (1998–2018) ===
Event	Record	Athlete	Date	Meet	Place	Ref
56 kg
Snatch						
Clean and jerk						
Total						
62 kg
Snatch						
Clean and jerk						
Total						
69 kg
Snatch	100 kg	K C Prakash	20 September 2017	Asian Indoor and Martial Arts Games	Ashgabat, Turkmenistan	
Clean and jerk	125 kg	K C Prakash	20 September 2017	Asian Indoor and Martial Arts Games	Ashgabat, Turkmenistan	
Total	225 kg	K C Prakash	20 September 2017	Asian Indoor and Martial Arts Games	Ashgabat, Turkmenistan	
77 kg
Snatch						
Clean and jerk						
Total						
85 kg
Snatch	125 kg	Kamal Bahadur Adhikari	27 April 2017	Asian Championships	Ashgabat, Turkmenistan	
Clean and jerk	160 kg	Kamal Bahadur Adhikari	27 April 2017	Asian Championships	Ashgabat, Turkmenistan	
Total	285 kg	Kamal Bahadur Adhikari	27 April 2017	Asian Championships	Ashgabat, Turkmenistan	
94 kg
Snatch						
Clean and jerk						
Total						
105 kg
Snatch						
Clean and jerk						
Total						
+105 kg
Snatch	124 kg	Pukar Gurung	28 December 2016	National Games	Rajbiraj, Nepal	
Clean and jerk						
Total						

=== Women (1998–2018) ===
Event	Record	Athlete	Date	Meet	Place	Ref
48 kg
Snatch						
Clean and jerk						
Total						
53 kg
Snatch	63 kg	Devi Kumari Chaudhary	25 December 2016	National Games	Rajbiraj, Nepal	
Clean and jerk		Devi Kumari Chaudhary				
Total						
58 kg
Snatch	68 kg	Kamala Shrestha	20 September 2017	Asian Indoor and Martial Arts Games	Ashgabat, Turkmenistan	
Clean and jerk	80 kg	Kamala Shrestha	20 September 2017	Asian Indoor and Martial Arts Games	Ashgabat, Turkmenistan	
Total	148 kg	Kamala Shrestha	20 September 2017	Asian Indoor and Martial Arts Games	Ashgabat, Turkmenistan	
63 kg
Snatch						
Clean and jerk						
Total						
69 kg
Snatch	73 kg	Tara Pun	2010	Open Grand Prix	Nepal	
Clean and jerk	91 kg	Tara Pun	29 February 2012	6th National Games	Mahendranagar, Nepal	
Total	157 kg	Tara Pun	29 February 2012	6th National Games	Mahendranagar, Nepal	
75 kg
Snatch						
Clean and jerk						
Total						
+75 kg
Snatch						
Clean and jerk	77 kg	Ram Maya	29 February 2012	6th National Games	Mahendranagar, Nepal	
Total	127 kg	Ram Maya	29 February 2012	6th National Games	Mahendranagar, Nepal	
