= Omar Slaimankhel =

Pakistani rugby league and rugby union footballer

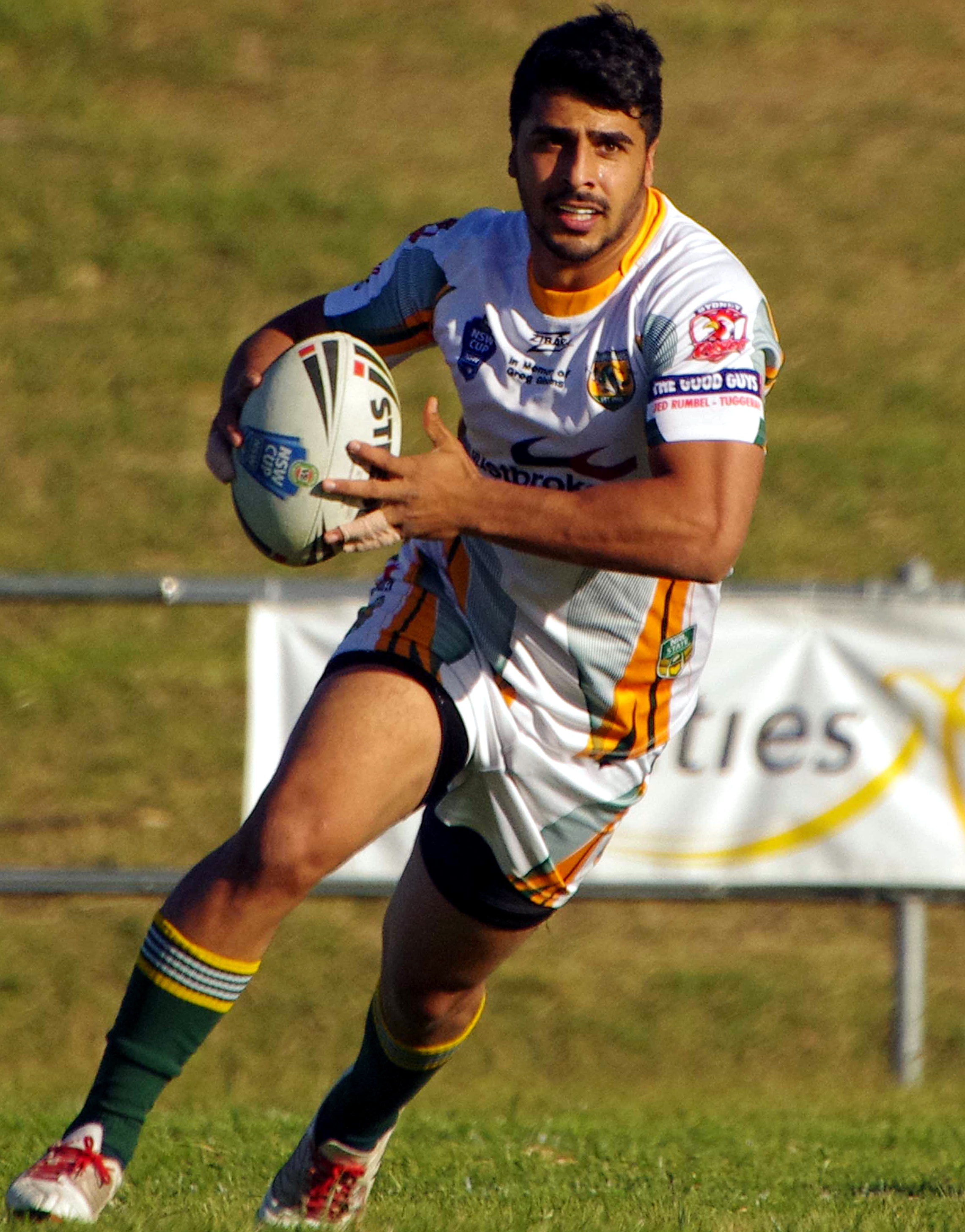

Personal information
- Born: 4 March 1992 (age 34) Kalu Khurd, Pakistan
- Height: 180 cm (5 ft 11 in)
- Weight: 85 kg (13 st 5 lb)

Playing information

Rugby league
- Position: Fullback, Wing
Club
Years	Team	Pld	T	G	FG	P
2012	New Zealand Warriors	5	0	0	0	0

Rugby union
Club
Years	Team	Pld	T	G	FG	P
2013–15	Canon Eagles	17	17	8	2	107
- Source: As of 15 April 2015

Omar Slaimankhel (born 4 March 1992) is an Afghan former professional rugby footballer who last played rugby league for Western Suburbs in the Ron Massey Cup. Slaimankhel previously played in the National Rugby League for the New Zealand Warriors before switching to rugby union and playing for Japanese team, Canon Eagles.

== Early life ==
Slaimankhel was born in Pakistan to Afghan refugee parents. When he was two years old his family moved to New Zealand.

Slaimankhel grew up playing rugby union until he switched codes to join the New Zealand Warriors rugby league development side. He played in the first XV for Auckland Grammar School, where he was also a track athlete and weightlifter.

== Playing career ==
Slaimankhel made his first grade debut for the Warriors on 16 June 2012 against the Cronulla-Sutherland Sharks. He played five games for the Warriors before taking up a lucrative deal with Japanese rugby union club Canon Eagles. This stint in Japanese rugby union would ultimately be Salimankhel's last appearances in top-tier football of either code, as he never cracked another NRL side despite joining their feeder clubs.

In mid-2015 Slaimankhel returned to rugby league, signing with the Sydney Roosters. He played for the Roosters feeder club, the Wyong Roos, in the New South Wales Cup. On 27 September, he was named at fullback in the 2015 New South Wales Cup Team of the Year. Slaimankhel played for the Roosters in the 2016 NRL Auckland Nines; however, he suffered an arm injury on the second day of competition. Slaimankhel played for The Auburn Warriors in The NSW Ron Massey Cup competition for two seasons. After Auburn were excluded from the competition he joined The Mount Pritchard Mounties for the 2018 season.

In 2019, Slaimankhel joined the Western Suburbs Ron Massey Cup team. On 6 May 2019, Slaimankhel was selected for the Ron Massey Cup representative side to play against Newcastle Rebels.

Slaimankhel now plays the 7s team for Afghanistan.

== Television appearance ==
Slaimankhel appeared on the eighteenth season of The Block along with his friend Oz. On the show they are known as the ‘bathroom kings’ winning all bathroom related rooms.

They won the season making the biggest profit ever seen in The Block.
