= Nirmal Baba =

Indian Spiritual Leader

- Born: Nirmaljit Singh Narula; 1952 (age 73–74); Samana, Punjab
- Occupation: Spiritual leader
- Years active: Since 2006
- Known for: Easy "Solutions" for worldly problems
- Relatives: Inder Singh Namdhari (brother-in-law)

Nirmaljit Singh Narula (born 1952), better known as Nirmal Baba, is an Indian godman. He is best known for his televised Samagams (congregations), The Third Eye of Nirmal Baba, which have attracted audiences of thousands seeking spiritual guidance and faith healing. The Samagams began gaining popularity in 2011 and by 2012 they'd been broadcast on over 30 major television channels and Nirmal Baba had amassed an online following of around 500,000.

== Early life ==
Nirmal Baba was born in Samana, Mandi in 1952. His father was a Sikh and his grandfather was a Hindu. Babaji's grandfather was childless, they took an oath that they would convert their children to Sikhs, after which they had four sons (who were made Sikhs). His grandfather's name was Lala Thakur Das, he was a renowned zamindar from a well-to-do family.

He used to have houses in Ranchi as well, but reportedly sold them after the Sikh massacre in 1984.

== Baba as a "Spiritual Leader" ==
Baba is a spiritual leader who is known for his spiritual public discourses mainly in India. His discourses are broadcast on multiple television channels across India & several other countries.

Apart from the large TV and YouTube viewership, he has many followers on Facebook and on Twitter. Baba is best known for his televised Samagams (congregations), The Third Eye of Nirmal Baba, which have attracted audiences of thousands. The Samagams began gaining popularity in 2011 and by 2012 they'd been broadcast on over 30 major television channels and Baba had amassed an online following of around 500,000.

He often gives seemingly very absurd solutions to people looking for remedies: his advice has included stocking fridges with cold drinks, eating pani poori, giving food to the poor and buying a new briefcase to overcome the worldly problems of the devotees'.

One of his supporters (a professor of psychology at Delhi University), has said that "he had some sort of extra-sensory perception" and "he was performing a positive mental health role".

On the bright side, these religious babas propagate the message of oneness and peace.

== Controversy ==
In 2017 the Akhil Bharatiya Akhara Parishad (All India Monastery Council) called for him to be boycotted, amongst a list of "fake Babas".

Baba has rebuffed these claims stating "There are many groups that do not like that I have reached the heights I have achieved," and that "some vested interests then started a campaign to malign [me] by planting people […] to file false cases and entangle [me in] legal cases.".

One former follower who challenged Baba for giving dietary advice that exasperated his health problems, was later charged with attempting to blackmail him.

For the Samagam (congregation) ticket, Nirmal Baba charges Rs. 2,000 from every attendee. The amount is directly transferred to Nirmal Baba's three branches that are Punjab National Bank, Yes Bank and ICICI Bank.

== Properties owned ==
- Land worth 21 crore rupees in Gurgaon district
- The hotel in Delhi's Greater Kailash

== Legal encounter(s) ==
On many instances Indian courts come heavily on Baba for his absurd and illogical solutions. Many complaints were filed against him of alleged fraudery by Indian lawyers and his former devotees.

One such instance was the person who filed the case against him for worsening his diabetic conditions was later arrested based on a complaint by Narula's son that he was blackmailing Narula.
