= Kamal Bahadur Adhikari =

Nepalese weightlifter (born 1977)

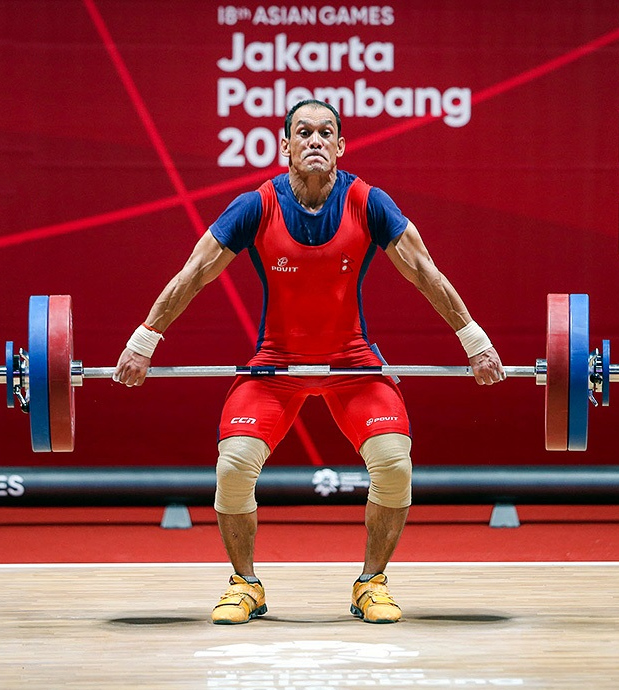
- Adhikari at the 2018 Asian Games

Personal information
- Nationality: Nepali
- Born: 20 July 1977 (age 48) Gitanagar, Chitwan, Nepal
- Height: 1.58 m (5 ft 2 in)
- Weight: 69 kg (152 lb)

Sport
- Sport: Weightlifting
- Event: 69 kg
- Club: Nepal Army Club
- Coached by: Dinesh Bhujel; Pradip Shrestha; Rukesh Tandukar
Medal record
Representing Nepal
South Asian Games
Gold medal – first place	2006 Colombo	-69 kg

Kamal Bahadur Adhikari (Nepali: कमल बहादुर अधिकारी; born July 20, 1977) is a Nepalese weightlifter. Adhikari represented Nepal at the 2008 Summer Olympics in Beijing, where he competed for the men's lightweight category. He finished 20th of 22 who completed both aspects, as he lifted 114 kg in the snatch, and hoisted 154 kg from his third and final attempt in the clean and jerk, for a total of 268 kg.

Adhikari took up weightlifting in 2000 and started competing while serving in the army. He studied at the Nepal Art College and coached a fellow weightlifter Manita Shrestha. At the 2018 Asian Games he served as the flag bearer for Nepal at the opening ceremony.
