= Puncak =

Mountain pass in Java, Indonesia

Coordinates: 6°42′14″S 106°59′39″E

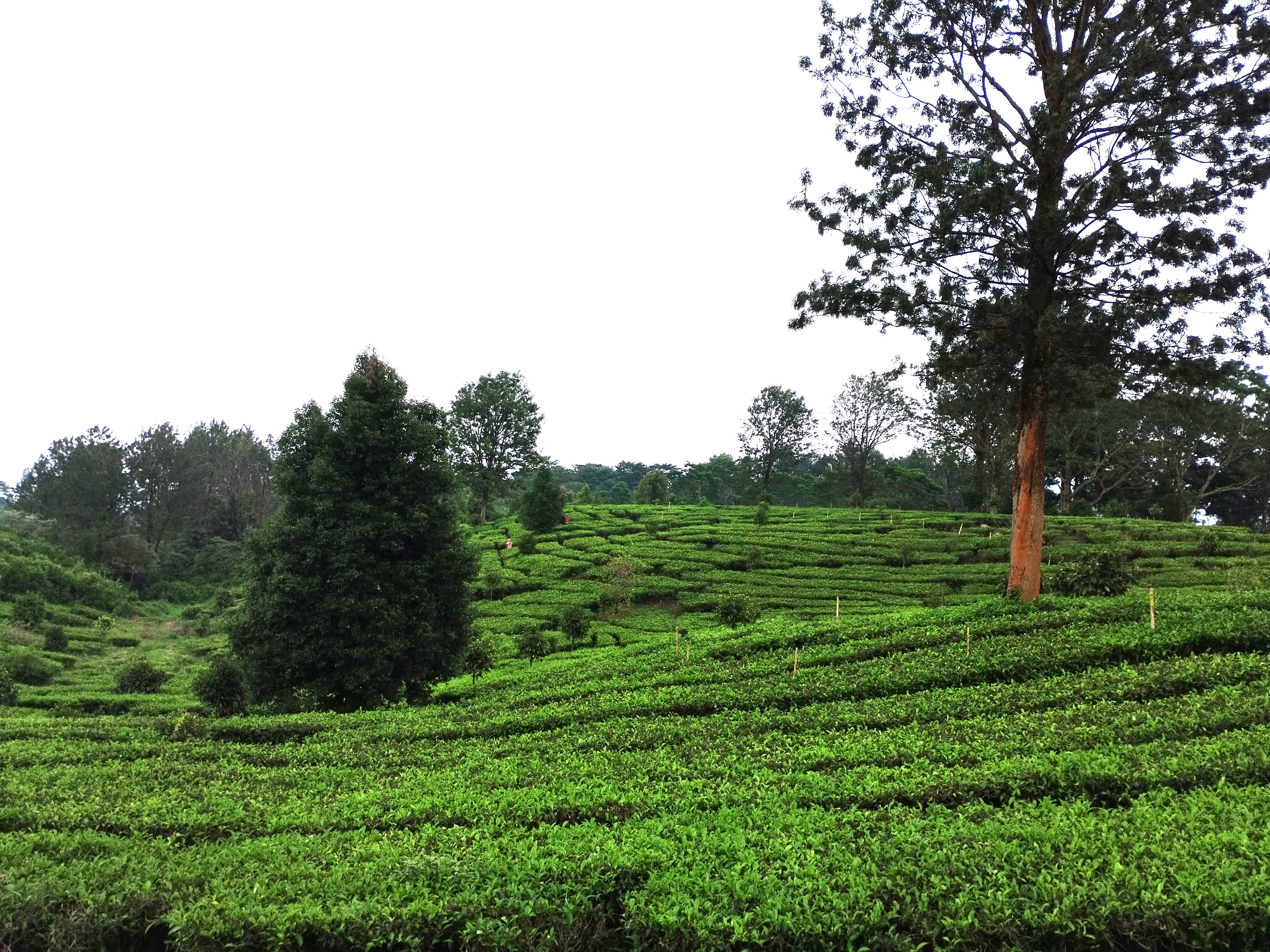
Tea farming

Puncak or Puncak Pass (Old Dutch: Poentjak; lit. 'top' or 'peak') is a mountain pass in Cisarua District, Bogor Regency, West Java, Indonesia. The pass connects the cities of Bogor and Bandung and is spread within the regencies of Bogor and Cianjur. Puncak Pass is located between Mt. Gede-Pangrango in the south and the Sentul Hills in the north. The highest point of the pass is about 1500 m altitude.

Puncak is a large conglomeration of districts in Bogor Regency, such as Cisarua, Ciawi, Megamendung, Cipanas, Cugenang, etc. All of those districts are unified by the main road, Jalan Raya Puncak.

== History ==
Puncak Pass is part of the historical cross-island Great Post Road, although it is not part of the current Indonesian National Route 1.

The highland, being cooler than Jakarta, is a popular resort area for the inhabitants of Jakarta who are looking for cooler air. Many Swiss-type chalets were built around Puncak during the pre-World War II colonial period. Today Puncak Pass is surrounded by hotels and resorts.

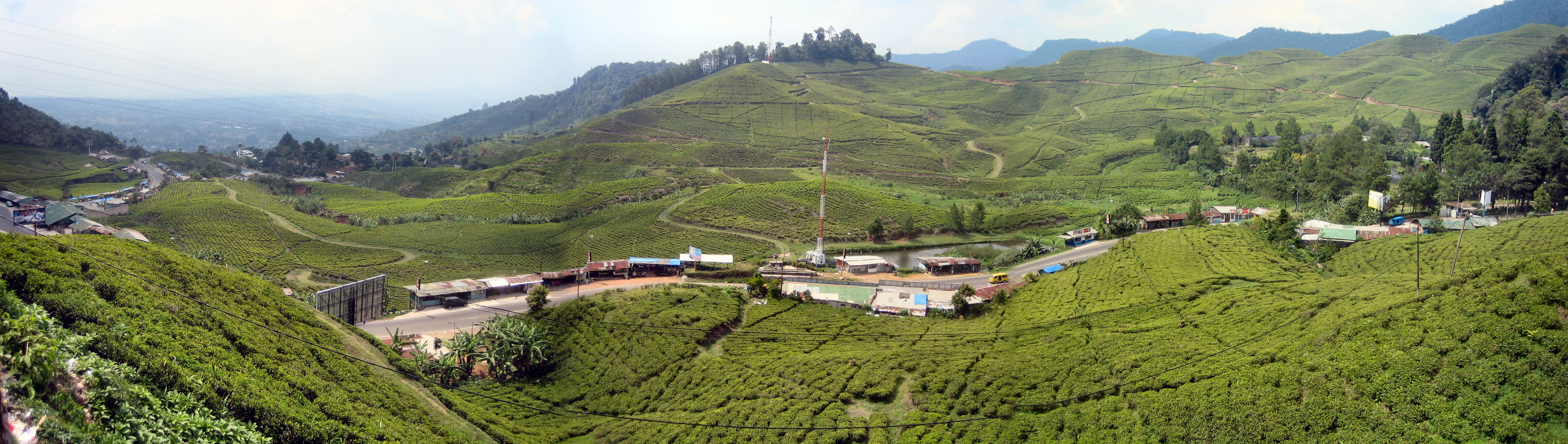
View from Puncak Pass toward the north, overlooking the tea plantation.

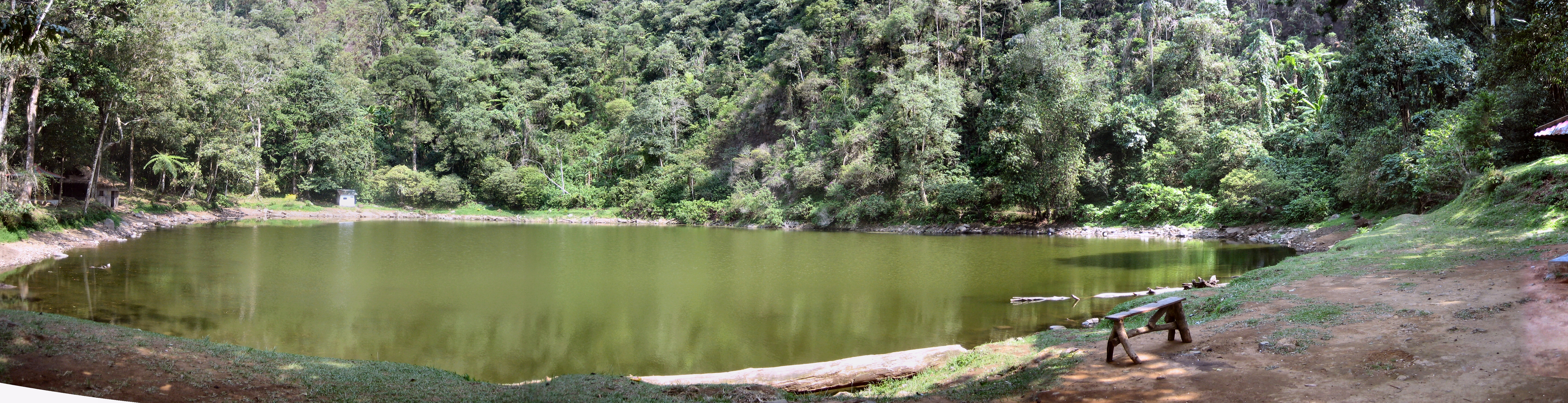
Telaga Warna volcanic lake

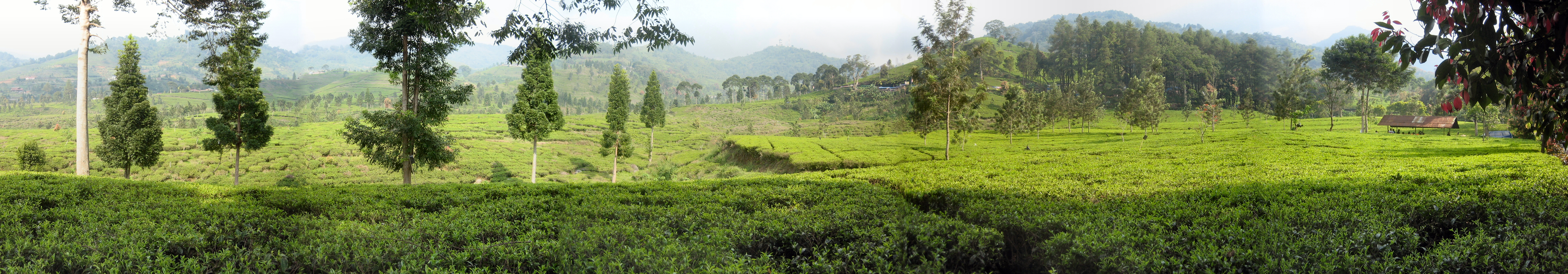
Tea plantation on Puncak

== Tourism ==
Puncak rests within the mountains between Bandung and Bogor. Many tourists visit this area of West Java to escape the heat and busy city areas.

Puncak is known for its individual private resorts/villas, which can be rented out for individual or group bookings. Schools and companies organize group outings, business conferences, and training in those resorts.

There are some tea plantations on either side of the main Puncak road, and the activities available here include paragliding, tea plantation tours, or sightseeing.

Puncak has served as a location for films, including the 1984 German-Indonesia production No Time to Die.

In addition, Puncak also has several landmarks and tourist attractions, such as Puncak Pass and Kota Bunga. Another tourist attraction, just south of the pass, is the Cibodas Botanical Garden. Taman Safari, a wildlife park, is also located in Puncak. The volcanic lake Telaga Warna is found near the main route.

=== Traffic ===
Due to the increase in popularity of the region for tourism and lack of corresponding road development, Puncak is well known in Indonesia for severe traffic jams; despite measures such as a one-way traffic policy, or odd-even policy, traffic jams still occur, with jams sometimes stretching to the Ciawi tollgate, which is a distance of 3.8 kilometres (2.4 mi) from the Gadog intersection, and may sometimes result in "horror" gridlocks lasting up to 14 hours during peak tourist seasons during holidays and long weekends. Complete road closure is sometimes necessary to resolve the situation.

== Developments ==
Bogor Regency is planning to build an alternative route from Sentul International Circuit-Babakan Madang-Hambalang-Sukmamakmur-Cipanas Palace, Pacet with total length of 47 kilometers, and a carriageway 30 meters wide. Most of the land will be granted by businessmen such as Probosutedjo and Tommy Suharto. The construction was planned to commence in 2011 and was scheduled to be partly finished in 2013.
