= Kurash at the 2018 Asian Games =

- Venue: Jakarta Convention Center
- Dates: 28–30 August 2018
- Competitors: 173 from 24 nations

Kurash at the 2018 Asian Games was held at the Jakarta Convention Center Assembly Hall, Jakarta, Indonesia, from 28 to 30 August 2018.

== Schedule ==
P	Preliminary rounds	F	Semifinals & Final

Event↓/Date →	28th Tue		29th Wed		30th Thu	
Men's 66 kg	P	F				
Men's 81 kg			P	F		
Men's 90 kg					P	F
Men's +90 kg	P	F				
Women's 52 kg	P	F				
Women's 63 kg			P	F		
Women's 78 kg					P	F

== Medalists ==
=== Men ===
Event	Gold	Silver	Bronze
−66 kg	Maruf Gaybulloev; Uzbekistan	Ruslan Buriev; Uzbekistan	Chan Hao-cheng; Chinese Taipei
−66 kg	Maruf Gaybulloev; Uzbekistan	Ruslan Buriev; Uzbekistan	Ghanbar Ali Ghanbari; Iran
−81 kg	Elias Aliakbari; Iran	Behruzi Khojazoda; Tajikistan	Omid Tiztak; Iran
−81 kg	Elias Aliakbari; Iran	Behruzi Khojazoda; Tajikistan	Sarvar Shomurodov; Uzbekistan
−90 kg	Shermukhammad Jandreev; Uzbekistan	Yakhyo Imamov; Uzbekistan	Yersultan Muzapparov; Kazakhstan
−90 kg	Shermukhammad Jandreev; Uzbekistan	Yakhyo Imamov; Uzbekistan	Husein Misri; Kuwait
+90 kg	Mukhsin Khisomiddinov; Uzbekistan	Jafar Pahlevani; Iran	Mansour Sarwari; Afghanistan
+90 kg	Mukhsin Khisomiddinov; Uzbekistan	Jafar Pahlevani; Iran	Nurbek Turaev; Uzbekistan

=== Women ===
Event	Gold	Silver	Bronze
−52 kg	Gulnor Sulaymanova; Uzbekistan	Pincky Balhara; India	Oysuluv Abdumajidova; Uzbekistan
−52 kg	Gulnor Sulaymanova; Uzbekistan	Pincky Balhara; India	Malaprabha Jadhav; India
−63 kg	Dildora Shermetova; Uzbekistan	Bayarbatyn Baasanjargal; Mongolia	Khasani Najmu Shifa; Indonesia
−63 kg	Dildora Shermetova; Uzbekistan	Bayarbatyn Baasanjargal; Mongolia	Mukhlisa Abdumalikova; Uzbekistan
−78 kg	None awarded	Otgony Mönkhtsetseg; Mongolia	Yang Hsien-tzu; Chinese Taipei
−78 kg	None awarded	Otgony Mönkhtsetseg; Mongolia	Nguyễn Thị Lan; Vietnam

== Medal table ==
Rank	Nation	Gold	Silver	Bronze	Total
1	Uzbekistan (UZB)	5	2	4	11
2	Iran (IRI)	1	1	2	4
3	Mongolia (MGL)	0	2	0	2
4	India (IND)	0	1	1	2
5	Tajikistan (TJK)	0	1	0	1
6	Chinese Taipei (TPE)	0	0	2	2
7	Afghanistan (AFG)	0	0	1	1
7	Indonesia (INA)	0	0	1	1
7	Kazakhstan (KAZ)	0	0	1	1
7	Kuwait (KUW)	0	0	1	1
7	Vietnam (VIE)	0	0	1	1
Totals (11 entries)		6	7	14	27

== Participating nations ==
A total of 173 athletes from 24 nations competed in kurash at the 2018 Asian Games:

- Afghanistan (10)
- Chinese Taipei (11)
- India (14)
- Indonesia (14)
- Iran (12)
- Iraq (2)
- Japan (2)
- Kazakhstan (12)
- Kuwait (3)
- Kyrgyzstan (4)
- Lebanon (3)
- Mongolia (14)
- Nepal (2)
- Pakistan (4)
- Palestine (1)
- Philippines (8)
- South Korea (2)
- Syria (2)
- Tajikistan (7)
- Thailand (5)
- Turkmenistan (14)
- Uzbekistan (14)
- Vietnam (9)
- Yemen (4)
