= Sambo at the 2018 Asian Games =

Sambo competitions

- Venue: Jakarta Convention Center
- Dates: 31 August – 1 September 2018
- Competitors: 71 from 18 nations

Sambo at the 2018 Asian Games was held at the Jakarta Convention Center Assembly Hall, Jakarta, Indonesia from 31 August to 1 September.

== Schedule ==
P	Preliminary rounds & Repechage	F	Finals

Event↓/Date →	31st Fri		1st Sat	
Men's 52 kg	P	F		
Men's 90 kg			P	F
Women's 48 kg	P	F		
Women's 68 kg			P	F

== Medalists ==
=== Men ===
Event	Gold	Silver	Bronze
52 kg	Baglan Ibragim; Kazakhstan	Shaaluugiin Erdenebaatar; Mongolia	Beimbet Kanzhanov; Kazakhstan
52 kg	Baglan Ibragim; Kazakhstan	Shaaluugiin Erdenebaatar; Mongolia	Akhmad Rakhmatilloev; Uzbekistan
90 kg	Kamoliddin Kholmamatov; Uzbekistan	Umed Khasanbekov; Tajikistan	Komronshokh Ustopiriyon; Tajikistan
90 kg	Kamoliddin Kholmamatov; Uzbekistan	Umed Khasanbekov; Tajikistan	Alibek Zekenov; Kazakhstan

=== Women ===
Event	Gold	Silver	Bronze
48 kg	Ganbaataryn Narantsetseg; Mongolia	Baasansürengiin Oidovchimed; Mongolia	Nodira Gulova; Uzbekistan
48 kg	Ganbaataryn Narantsetseg; Mongolia	Baasansürengiin Oidovchimed; Mongolia	Aizhan Zhylkybayeva; Kazakhstan
68 kg	Dildash Kuryshbayeva; Kazakhstan	Nilufar Davletova; Uzbekistan	Tsogt-Ochiryn Battsetseg; Mongolia
68 kg	Dildash Kuryshbayeva; Kazakhstan	Nilufar Davletova; Uzbekistan	Natsuki Tomi; Japan

== Medal table ==
Rank	Nation	Gold	Silver	Bronze	Total
1	Kazakhstan (KAZ)	2	0	3	5
2	Mongolia (MGL)	1	2	1	4
3	Uzbekistan (UZB)	1	1	2	4
4	Tajikistan (TJK)	0	1	1	2
5	Japan (JPN)	0	0	1	1
Totals (5 entries)		4	4	8	16

== Participating nations ==
A total of 71 athletes from 18 nations competed in sambo at the 2018 Asian Games:

- Afghanistan (1)
- Bahrain (1)
- Chinese Taipei (1)
- Indonesia (8)
- Iran (4)
- Iraq (1)
- Japan (3)
- Kazakhstan (8)
- Kyrgyzstan (6)
- Lebanon (3)
- Malaysia (2)
- Mongolia (7)
- Syria (2)
- Tajikistan (4)
- Thailand (4)
- Turkmenistan (7)
- Uzbekistan (8)
- Vietnam (1)
