= Tennis at the 2018 Asian Games – Men's doubles =

Men's doubles at the 2018 Asian Games
- Venue: Jakabaring Tennis Court
- Dates: 19–24 August 2018
- Competitors: 70 from 21 nations

Medalists
| gold medal | Rohan Bopanna; Divij Sharan | India |
| silver medal | Alexander Bublik; Denis Yevseyev | Kazakhstan |
| bronze medal | Kaito Uesugi; Sho Shimabukuro | Japan |
| bronze medal | Yosuke Watanuki; Yuya Ito | Japan |

Men's doubles
- Tennis at the 2018 Asian Games

Events
| Singles | men | women |
| Doubles | men | women | mixed |
| Asian Games |

The men's doubles tennis event at the 2018 Asian Games took place at the Tennis Court of Jakabaring Sport City, Palembang, Indonesia from 19 to 24 August 2018.

Chung Hyeon and Lim Yong-kyu were the defending champions, however Chung chose not to compete. Lim partnered alongside Kwon Soon-woo, but lost to Gong Maoxin and Zhang Ze in the third round. Rohan Bopanna and Divij Sharan won the gold medal, defeating Alexander Bublik and Denis Yevseyev in the final. Sho Shimabukuro and Kaito Uesugi, and Yuya Ito and Yosuke Watanuki won the bronze medals.

== Schedule ==
All times are Western Indonesia Time (UTC+07:00)

| Date | Time | Event |
|---|---|---|
| Sunday, 19 August 2018 | 13:00 | Round of 64 |
| Monday, 20 August 2018 | 10:00 | Round of 32 |
| Tuesday, 21 August 2018 | 11:00 | Round of 16 |
| Wednesday, 22 August 2018 | 12:00 | Quarterfinals |
| Thursday, 23 August 2018 | 11:30 | Semifinals |
| Friday, 24 August 2018 | 11:00 | Final |

== Results ==
=== Finals ===
| Semifinals | | | | | Final |
| 1 | Rohan Bopanna (IND); Divij Sharan (IND) | 4 | 6 | [10] |
| 12 | Kaito Uesugi (JPN); Sho Shimabukuro (JPN) | 6 | 3 | [8] | 1 | Rohan Bopanna (IND); Divij Sharan (IND) | 6 | 6 |
| 11 | Alexander Bublik (KAZ); Denis Yevseyev (KAZ) | 6 | 6^{4} | [10] | 11 | Alexander Bublik (KAZ); Denis Yevseyev (KAZ) | 3 | 4 |
| | Yosuke Watanuki (JPN); Yuya Ito (JPN) | 4 | 7^{7} | [7] |

=== Top half ===
==== Section 1 ====
Round of 64
David Agung Susanto (INA); Anthony Susanto (INA) | 6 | 6
Abdulla Faaih Fazeel (MDV); Ahmed Saai Waheed (MDV) | 1 | 0

Round of 32
1 | Rohan Bopanna (IND); Divij Sharan (IND) | 6 | 6
David Agung Susanto (INA); Anthony Susanto (INA) | 3 | 3
Frederico Sarmento (TLS); Nazário Gusmão (TLS) | 0 | 2
16 | Nuttanon Kadchapanan (THA); Wishaya Trongcharoenchaikul (THA) | 6 | 6
10 | Jurabek Karimov (UZB); Sanjar Fayziev (UZB) | 6 | 6
Giovani Samaha (LBN); Hady Habib (LBN) | 3 | 1
Aqeel Khan (PAK); Abid Ali Akbar (PAK) | 3 | 1
5 | Hsieh Cheng-peng (TPE); Yang Tsung-hua (TPE) | 6 | 6

Round of 16
1 | Rohan Bopanna (IND); Divij Sharan (IND) | 6 | 6
16 | Nuttanon Kadchapanan (THA); Wishaya Trongcharoenchaikul (THA) | 3 | 1
10 | Jurabek Karimov (UZB); Sanjar Fayziev (UZB) | 4 | 3
5 | Hsieh Cheng-peng (TPE); Yang Tsung-hua (TPE) | 6 | 6

Quarterfinals
1 | Rohan Bopanna (IND); Divij Sharan (IND) | 6 | 5 | [10]
5 | Hsieh Cheng-peng (TPE); Yang Tsung-hua (TPE) | 3 | 7 | [1]

==== Section 2 ====
Round of 64

Round of 32
3 | Gong Maoxin (CHN); Zhang Ze (CHN) | 6 | 6
Düürenbayaryn Erdenebayar (MGL); Mönkhbaataryn Badrakh (MGL) | 0 | 1
Wong Hong Kit (HKG); Anthony Jackie Tang (HKG) | 1 | 7 | [7]
15 | Kwon Soon-woo (KOR); Lim Yong-kyu (KOR) | 6 | 5 | [10]
12 | Kaito Uesugi (JPN); Sho Shimabukuro (JPN) | 6 | 4 | [10]
Lý Hoàng Nam (VIE); Nguyễn Văn Phương (VIE) | 2 | 6 | [2]
Yasitha de Silva (SRI); Sharmal Dissanayake (SRI) | 4 | 2
7 | Timur Khabibulin (KAZ); Aleksandr Nedovyesov (KAZ) | 6 | 6

Round of 16
3 | Gong Maoxin (CHN); Zhang Ze (CHN) | 7 | 7
15 | Kwon Soon-woo (KOR); Lim Yong-kyu (KOR) | 5 | 5
12 | Kaito Uesugi (JPN); Sho Shimabukuro (JPN) | 7^{7} | 6
7 | Timur Khabibulin (KAZ); Aleksandr Nedovyesov (KAZ) | 6^{4} | 3

Quarterfinals
3 | Gong Maoxin (CHN); Zhang Ze (CHN) | 6 | 2 | [2]
12 | Kaito Uesugi (JPN); Sho Shimabukuro (JPN) | 4 | 6 | [10]

=== Bottom half ===
==== Section 3 ====
Round of 64
Francis Alcantara (PHI); Jeson Patrombon (PHI) | 6 | 6
Jabor Al-Mutawa (QAT); Mubarak Al-Harrasi (QAT) | 4 | 2

Round of 32
6 | Li Zhe (CHN); Wu Di (CHN) | 6 | 6
Ahmed Akram (MDV); Ali Faris Mohamed (MDV) | 0 | 1
Batjargalyn Günbürd (MGL); Sandagiin Angarag (MGL) | 2 | 1
11 | Alexander Bublik (KAZ); Denis Yevseyev (KAZ) | 6 | 6
13 | Sumit Nagal (IND); Ramkumar Ramanathan (IND) | 6 | 6
Samrakshak Bajracharya (NEP); Abhishek Bastola (NEP) | 1 | 1
Francis Alcantara (PHI); Jeson Patrombon (PHI) | 6 | 6^{5} | [7]
4 | Chen Ti (TPE); Peng Hsien-yin (TPE) | 4 | 7^{7} | [10]

Round of 16
6 | Li Zhe (CHN); Wu Di (CHN) | 4 | 6^{6}
11 | Alexander Bublik (KAZ); Denis Yevseyev (KAZ) | 6 | 7^{8}
13 | Sumit Nagal (IND); Ramkumar Ramanathan (IND) | 7^{7} | 7^{7}
4 | Chen Ti (TPE); Peng Hsien-yin (TPE) | 6^{5} | 6^{2}

Quarterfinals
11 | Alexander Bublik (KAZ); Denis Yevseyev (KAZ) | 5 | 6 | [10]
13 | Sumit Nagal (IND); Ramkumar Ramanathan (IND) | 7 | 4 | [2]

==== Section 4 ====
Round of 64
Phạm Minh Tuấn (VIE); Trịnh Linh Giang (VIE) | 2 | 2
Hong Seong-chan (KOR); Lee Jea-moon (KOR) | 6 | 6

Round of 32
8 | Justin Barki (INA); Christopher Rungkat (INA) | 4 | 6 | [7]
Yosuke Watanuki (JPN); Yuya Ito (JPN) | 6 | 3 | [10]
Mohammad Kargaran (IRI); Shahin Khaledan (IRI) | 4 | 2
9 | Wong Chun Hun (HKG); Yeung Pak Long (HKG) | 6 | 6
14 | Farrukh Dustov (UZB); Denis Istomin (UZB) | 7^{7} | 6
Muhammad Abid (PAK); Muzammil Murtaza (PAK) | 6^{5} | 2
Hong Seong-chan (KOR); Lee Jea-moon (KOR) | 7^{7} | 6
2 | Sanchai Ratiwatana (THA); Sonchat Ratiwatana (THA) | 6^{4} | 4

Round of 16
Yosuke Watanuki (JPN); Yuya Ito (JPN) | 6 | 6
9 | Wong Chun Hun (HKG); Yeung Pak Long (HKG) | 4 | 4
14 | Farrukh Dustov (UZB); Denis Istomin (UZB) | 3 | 6^{8}
Hong Seong-chan (KOR); Lee Jea-moon (KOR) | 6 | 7^{10}

Quarterfinals
Yosuke Watanuki (JPN); Yuya Ito (JPN) | 6 | 5 | [10]
Hong Seong-chan (KOR); Lee Jea-moon (KOR) | 3 | 7 | [2]
