= Uzbekistan at the 2018 Asian Games =

- IOC code: UZB
- NOC: National Olympic Committee of the Republic of Uzbekistan
- Website: www.olympic.uz

in Jakarta and Palembang August 18 – September 2
- Flag bearer: Israil Madrimov
- Medals Ranked 5th: Gold 21 Silver 24 Bronze 25 Total 70

Asian Games appearances (overview)
- 1994; 1998; 2002; 2006; 2010; 2014; 2018; 2022; 2026

Uzbekistan participated in the 2018 Asian Games in Jakarta and Palembang, Indonesia from 18 August to 2 September 2018. Uzbekistan made its debut at the Asian Games in 1994 Hiroshima, and the best achievement was in 2002 Busan, with the acquisition of 15 gold, 12 silver and 24 bronze medals. At the last edition in Incheon, the country wrapped up its campaign with 45 medals in all - nine gold, 14 silver and 22 bronze.

== Medalists ==
The following Uzbekistan competitors won medals at the Games.

Medal	Name	Sport	Event	Date
Gold	Bekzod Abdurakhmonov	Wrestling	Men's freestyle 74 kg	19 Aug
Gold	Nikita Rafalovich	Taekwondo	Men's 80 kg	22 Aug
Gold	Muminjon Abdullaev	Wrestling	Men's Greco-Roman 130 kg	22 Aug
Gold	Shakhboz Kholmurzaev; Shakhboz Abdujabborov	Rowing	Double sculls	23 Aug
Gold	Denis Istomin	Tennis	Men's singles	25 Aug
Gold	Ruslan Nurudinov	Weightlifting	Men's 105 kg	26 Aug
Gold	Maruf Gaybulloev	Kurash	Men's 66 kg	28 Aug
Gold	Mukhsin Khisomiddinov	Kurash	Men's +90 kg	28 Aug
Gold	Gulnor Sulaymanova	Kurash	Women's 52 kg	28 Aug
Gold	Diyorbek Urozboev	Judo	Men's 60 kg	29 Aug
Gold	Dildora Shermetova	Kurash	Women's 63 kg	29 Aug
Gold	Svetlana Radzivil	Athletics	Women's high jump	29 Aug
Gold	Vadim Menkov	Canoeing	Men's C-1 1000 metres	30 Aug
Gold	Kumush Yuldashova	Kurash	Women's 78 kg	30 Aug
Gold	Shermukhammad Jandreev	Kurash	Men's 90 kg	30 Aug
Gold	Jasurbek Latipov	Boxing	Men's 52 kg	1 Sep
Gold	Mirazizbek Mirzakhalilov	Boxing	Men's 56 kg	1 Sep
Gold	Ikboljon Kholdarov	Boxing	Men's 64 kg	1 Sep
Gold	Bobo-Usmon Baturov	Boxing	Men's 69 kg	1 Sep
Gold	Israil Madrimov	Boxing	Men's 75 kg	1 Sep
Gold	Kamoliddin Kholmamatov	Sambo	Men's 90 kg	1 Sep
Silver	Darya Latisheva	Wushu	Women's nanquan	20 Aug
Silver	Niyaz Pulatov	Taekwondo	Men's 58 kg	20 Aug
Silver	Dmitriy Shokin	Taekwondo	Men's +80 kg	21 Aug
Silver	Doston Yokubov	Weightlifting	Men's 69 kg	22 Aug
Silver	Rustam Assakalov	Wrestling	Men's Greco-Roman 87 kg	22 Aug
Silver	Sardor Tulkinkhujaev; Alisher Turdiev	Rowing	Men's coxless pair	23 Aug
Silver	Oksana Chusovitina	Gymnastics	Vault	23 Aug
Silver	Madinabonu Mannopova	Taekwondo	Women's −49 kg	23 Aug
Silver	Islambek Mambetnazarov; Anatoliy Krasnov; Alisher Yarov; Shehroz Hakimov; Shokhjakhon Najmiev; Zafar Usmonov; Otamurod Rakhimov; Dostonjon Bahriev; Dostonjon Khursanov	Rowing	Men's lightweight eight	24 Aug
Silver	Muradjan Khalmuratov	Cycling	Road time trial	24 Aug
Silver	Omadoy Otakuziyeva	Weightlifting	Women's 75 kg	26 Aug
Silver	Bakhriniso Babaeva	Karate	Women's kumite 50 kg	27 Aug
Silver	Asal Ikramova; Dildora Rakhmatova; Sabina Tashkenbaeva; Nurinisso Usmanova	Gymnastics	Women's rhythmic team all-around	27 Aug
Silver	Sabina Tashkenbaeva	Gymnastics	Women's rhythmic individual all-around	28 Aug
Silver	Ruslan Buriev	Kurash	Men's 66 kg	28 Aug
Silver	Ruslan Kurbanov	Athletics	Men's triple jump	29 Aug
Silver	Nadiya Dusanova	Athletics	Women's high jump	29 Aug
Silver	Dilnoza Rakhmatova; Nilufar Zokirova	Canoeing	Women's C-2 500 metres	30 Aug
Silver	Yakhyo Imamov	Kurash	Men's 90 kg	30 Aug
Silver	Artur Guliev; Elyorjon Mamadaliev	Canoeing	Men's C-2 200 metres	1 Sep
Silver	Ekaterina Shubina; Yuliya Borzova	Canoeing	Women's K-2 500 metres	1 Sep
Silver	Hasanboy Dusmatov	Boxing	Men's 49 kg	1 Sep
Silver	Shunkor Abdurasulov	Boxing	Men's 60 kg	1 Sep
Silver	Nilufar Davletova	Sambo	Women's 68 kg	1 Sep
Bronze	Sirojiddin Khasanov	Wrestling	Men's freestyle 65 kg	19 Aug
Bronze	Magomed Ibragimov	Wrestling	Men's freestyle 97 kg	19 Aug
Bronze	Davit Modzmanashvili	Wrestling	Men's freestyle 125 kg	20 Aug
Bronze	Nigora Tursunkulova	Taekwondo	Women's 67 kg	20 Aug
Bronze	Adkhamjon Ergashev	Weightlifting	Men's 62 kg	21 Aug
Bronze	Svetlana Osipova	Taekwondo	Women's +67 kg	21 Aug
Bronze	Islambek Mambetnazarov; Shehroz Hakimov; Otamurod Rakhimov; Zafar Usmonov	Rowing	Lightweight coxless four	23 Aug
Bronze	Abdumalik Salimov	Pencak silat	Men's tanding 65 kg	26 Aug
Bronze	Sadriddin Saymatov	Karate	Men's kumite 60 kg	26 Aug
Bronze	Barno Mirzaeva	Karate	Women's kumite 61 kg	26 Aug
Bronze	Suhrob Khodjaev	Athletics	Men's hammer throw	26 Aug
Bronze	Rustam Djangabaev	Weightlifting	Men's +105 kg	27 Aug
Bronze	Nurbek Turaev	Kurash	Men's +90 kg	28 Aug
Bronze	Oysuluv Abdumajidova	Kurash	Women's 52 kg	28 Aug
Bronze	Sarvar Shomurodov	Kurash	Men's 81 kg	29 Aug
Bronze	Mukhlisa Abdumalikova	Kurash	Women's 63 kg	29 Aug
Bronze	Shakhriyor Makhkamov; Shokhrukhbek Azamov	Canoeing	Men's K-2 1000 metres	30 Aug
Bronze	Nurislom Tukhtasin Ugli; Serik Mirbekov	Canoeing	Men's C-2 1000 metres	30 Aug
Bronze	Gulnoza Matniyazova	Judo	Women's 70 kg	30 Aug
Bronze	Sherali Juraev	Judo	Men's 100 kg	31 Aug
Bronze	Bekmurod Oltiboev	Judo	Men's +100 kg	31 Aug
Bronze	Nodira Gulova	Sambo	Women's 48 kg	31 Aug
Bronze	Akhmad Rakhmatilloev	Sambo	Men's 52 kg	31 Aug
Bronze	Dilnoza Rakhmatova	Canoeing	Women's C-1 200 metres	1 Sep
Bronze	Natalya Kazantseva; Yuliya Borzova; Ekaterina Shubina; Kseniya Kochneva	Canoeing	Women's K-4 500 metres	1 Sep

Medals by sport
Sport	1st place, gold medalist(s)	2nd place, silver medalist(s)	3rd place, bronze medalist(s)	Total
Athletics	1	2	1	4
Boxing	5	2	0	7
Canoeing	1	3	4	8
Cycling	0	1	0	1
Gymnastics	0	3	0	3
Judo	1	0	3	4
Karate	0	1	2	3
Kurash	6	2	4	11
Pencak silat	0	0	1	1
Rowing	1	2	1	4
Sambo	1	1	2	4
Taekwondo	1	3	2	6
Tennis	1	0	0	1
Weightlifting	1	2	2	5
Wrestling	2	1	3	6
Wushu	0	1	0	1
Total	21	24	25	70

Medals by day
Day	Date	1st place, gold medalist(s)	2nd place, silver medalist(s)	3rd place, bronze medalist(s)	Total
1	August 19	1	0	2	3
2	August 20	0	2	2	4
3	August 21	0	1	2	3
4	August 22	2	2	0	4
5	August 23	1	3	1	5
6	August 24	0	2	0	2
7	August 25	1	0	0	1
8	August 26	1	1	4	6
9	August 27	0	2	1	3
10	August 28	3	2	2	7
11	August 29	3	2	2	7
12	August 30	3	2	3	8
13	August 31	0	0	4	4
14	September 1	6	5	2	13
15	September 2	0	0	0	0
Total		21	24	25	70

== Competitors ==
The following is a list of the number of competitors representing Uzbekistan that participated at the Games:

Sport	Men	Women	Total
Artistic swimming	—	10	10
Athletics	5	6	11
Boxing	7	1	8
Canoeing	15	7	22
Cycling	2	1	3
Diving	1	0	1
Equestrian	4	0	4
Fencing	4	0	4
Football	20	0	20
Golf	4	0	4
Gymnastics	7	7	14
Ju-jitsu	9	1	10
Judo	7	6	13
Karate	4	4	8
Kurash	8	6	14
Pencak silat	4	1	5
Rowing	17	0	17
Sambo	4	4	8
Shooting	1	3	4
Swimming	4	1	5
Taekwondo	8	8	16
Tennis	4	4	8
Triathlon	2	2	4
Weightlifting	6	2	8
Wrestling	12	3	15
Wushu	3	1	4
Total	162	78	240

Demonstration events

Sport	Men	Women	Total
eSports	1	0	1

== Artistic swimming ==
Athlete	Event	Technical routine		Free routine		Total	Rank
Athlete	Event	Points	Rank	Points	Rank	Total	Rank
Anna Eltisheva; Anastasiya Morozova; Nafisa Shomirzaeva^{RR}	Duet	77.7847	6	78.1333	5	155.9180	5
Anna Eltisheva; Khurshida Khakimova; Anastasiya Morozova; Diana Onkes; Anastasiya Ruzmetova; Khonzodakhon Toshkhujaeva; Nafisa Shomirzaeva^{FR} Nozimakhon Tulkinova^{FR} Nigora Shomakhsudova^{TR} Mokhirakhon Tulkinova^{TR}	Team	76.4403	5	78.0333	5	154.4736	5

FR: Reserved in free routine; RR: Reserved in technical and free routines; TR: Reserved in technical routine.

== Boxing ==
Men

Athlete	Event	Round of 32	Round of 16	Quarterfinals	Semifinals	Final	Rank
Athlete	Event	Opposition Result	Opposition Result	Opposition Result	Opposition Result	Opposition Result	Rank
Hasanboy Dusmatov	–49 kg	Bye	K Khamsathone (LAO); W 5–0	MT Uulu (KGZ); W 5–0	Wu ZL (CHN); W 5–0	A Panghal (IND); L 2–3	2nd place, silver medalist(s)
Jasurbek Latipov	–52 kg	Bye	Hu JG (CHN); W 3–2	A Suguro (INA); W 4–1	A Usenaliev (KGZ); W 4–1	R Ladon (PHI); W 3–1	1st place, gold medalist(s)
Mirazizbek Mirzakhalilov	–56 kg	Bye	M Alwadi (JOR); W 5–0	K Enkh-Amar (MGL); W 3–2	SA Amoragam (INA); W 5–0	Jo H-n (PRK); W RSC–I	1st place, gold medalist(s)
Shunkor Abdurasulov	–60 kg	Bye	J Palicte (PHI); W 5–0	AK Uulu (KGZ); W 3–2	R Juntrong (THA); W 5–0	E Tsendbaatar (MGL); L 2–3	2nd place, silver medalist(s)
Ikboljon Kholdarov	–64 kg	Bye	O Al-Kasbeh (JOR); W 5–0	Lim H-s (KOR); W 4–0	D Narimatsu (JPN); W 5–0	B Chinzorig (MGL); W 5–0	1st place, gold medalist(s)
Bobo Usmon Baturov	–69 kg	O Byamba-Erdene (MGL); W 5–0	ME Qiong (CHN); W 4–1	Lim H-c (KOR); W 5–0	S Ardee (THA); W 4–1	A Shymbergenov (KAZ); W 3–1	1st place, gold medalist(s)
Israil Madrimov	–75 kg	Bye	D Davaanyam (MGL); W 5–0	S Mousavi (IRI); W 5–0	EF Marcial (PHI); W 3–2	A Amankul (KAZ); W 3–2	1st place, gold medalist(s)

Women

Athlete	Event	Round of 32	Round of 16	Quarterfinals	Semifinals	Final	Rank
Athlete	Event	Opposition Result	Opposition Result	Opposition Result	Opposition Result	Opposition Result	Rank
Yodgoroy Mirzaeva	–57 kg	—N/a	Huang H-w (TPE); L 0–5	Did not advance			

== Canoeing ==
=== Slalom ===
Athlete	Event	Heats		Semifinal		Final	
Athlete	Event	Best	Rank	Time	Rank	Time	Rank
Abubakir Bukanov	Men's C-1	98.54	10 Q	108.06	11	Did not advance	
Alibek Temirgaliev	Men's C-1	89.34	2 Q	101.16	9 Q	101.15	6
Ramil Kirpichev	Men's K-1	99.48	13 Q	120.99	12	Did not advance	
Djanibek Temirgaliev	Men's K-1	95.46	10 Q	99.02	7 Q	97.44	6

=== Sprint ===
Athlete	Event	Heats		Semifinal		Final	
Athlete	Event	Time	Rank	Time	Rank	Time	Rank
Vadim Menkov	Men's C-1 1000 m	—N/a				4:05.224	1st place, gold medalist(s)
Artur Guliev; Elyorjon Mamadaliev	Men's C-2 200 m	38.084	1 QF	Bye		37.080	2nd place, silver medalist(s)
Nurislom Tukhtasin Ugli; Serik Mirbekov	Men's C-2 1000 m	—N/a				3:44.061	3rd place, bronze medalist(s)
Shakhriyor Makhkamov; Shokhrukhbek Azamov	Men's K-2 1000 m	3:31.572	2 QF	Bye		3:26.273	3rd place, bronze medalist(s)
Aleksandr Tropin; Javokhir Nurmatov; Vilyam Ibragimov; Aleksey Mochalov	Men's K-4 500 m	1:28.826	3 QF	Bye		1:28.557	5
Dilnoza Rakhmatova	Women's C-1 200 m	50.860	1 QF	Bye		49.282	3rd place, bronze medalist(s)
Dilnoza Rakhmatova; Nilufar Zokirova	Women's C-2 500 m	—N/a				2:06.160	2nd place, silver medalist(s)
Olga Umaralieva	Women's K-1 200 m	43.575	3 QF	Bye		DNS	—
Ekaterina Shubina; Yuliya Borzova	Women's K-2 500 m	—N/a				1:48.012	2nd place, silver medalist(s)
Natalya Kazantseva; Yuliya Borzova; Ekaterina Shubina; Kseniya Kochneva	Women's K-4 500 m	—N/a				1:38.040	3rd place, bronze medalist(s)

Qualification legend: QF=Final; QS=Semifinal

== Cycling ==
=== Road ===
Athlete	Event	Final	
Athlete	Event	Time	Rank
Andrey Izmaylov	Men's road race	3:34:07	39
Muradjan Khalmuratov	Men's road race	3:26:13	15
Renata Baymetova	Women's road race	2:59:28	12
Muradjan Khalmuratov	Men's time trial	57:10.52	2nd place, silver medalist(s)

=== Track ===
Pursuit

Athlete	Event	Qualification		Final	
Athlete	Event	Time	Rank	Opposition Time	Rank
Andrey Izmaylov	Men's pursuit	4:43.155	10	Did not advance	
Renata Baymetova	Women's pursuit	4:02.416	9	Did not advance	

Omnium

Athlete	Event	Scratch race		Tempo race		Elimination race		Points race		Total points	Rank
Athlete	Event	Rank	Points	Rank	Points	Rank	Points	Rank	Points	Total points	Rank
Muradjan Khalmuratov	Men's omnium	5	32	6	20	12	18	12	3	83	8
Renata Baymetova	Women's omnium	1	40	10	−20	10	22	5	20	104	7

Madison

Athlete	Event	Points	Laps	Rank
Andrey Izmaylov; Muradjan Khalmuratov	Men's madison	−8	−20	5

== Diving ==
Men

Athlete	Event	Preliminaries		Final	
Athlete	Event	Points	Rank	Points	Rank
Doston Botirov	3 m springboard	337.20	12 Q	336.00	10

== Equestrian ==
Jumping

Athlete	Horse	Event	Qualification		Qualifier 1			Qualifier 2 Team Final			Final round A			Final round B		
Athlete	Horse	Event	Points	Rank	Penalties	Total	Rank	Penalties	Total	Rank	Penalties	Total	Rank	Penalties	Total	Rank
Umidjon Komilov	Udgi Girl des Gy	Individual	4.64	16	Eliminated			Did not advance								
Gairat Nazarov	Quatro Junior	Individual	14.01 #	55	17	31.01	54	Did not advance								
Okiljon Sobirjonov	Camira	Individual	6.40	28	8	14.40	32 Q	13	27.40	36 Q	12	39.40	33	Did not advance		
Nurjan Tuyakbaev	King Cornet L	Individual	9.00	36	9	18.00	37 Q	22 #	40.00	45 Q	18	58.00	37	Did not advance		
Umidjon Komilov; Nurjan Tuyakbaev; Okiljon Sobirjonov; Gairat Nazarov	See above	Team	20.04	9	34	54.04	10 Q	34	88.04	10	—N/a					

# – indicates that the score of this rider does not count in the team competition, since only the best three results of a team are counted.

== Fencing ==
Individual

Athlete	Event	Preliminary		Round of 32	Round of 16	Quarterfinals	Semifinals	Final	
Athlete	Event	Opposition Score	Rank	Opposition Score	Opposition Score	Opposition Score	Opposition Score	Opposition Score	Rank
Fayzulla Alimov	Men's épée	Jung J-s (KOR): L 2–5; M Al-Shamari (QAT): W 5–1; NA Bhatti (PAK): W 5–1; Lan MH (CHN): L 1–5; MR Mohamed (MAS): L 1–5; A Al-Shatti (THA): DNS	5 Q	MR Tadi (IRI); W 15–10	Jung J-s (KOR); L 10–15	Did not advance			15
Oleg Sokolov	Men's épée	D Siahaan (INA): W 5–3; Koh IJ (MAS): W 5–3; B Batkhüü (MGL): W 5–4; A Saeeduddin (PAK): W 5–1; D Alexanin (KAZ): W 3–1; Nguyễn PĐ (VIE): W 5–2	1 Q	Bye	Nguyễn PĐ (VIE); L 9–15	Did not advance			9

Team

Athlete	Event	Round of 16	Quarterfinals	Semifinals	Final	
Athlete	Event	Opposition Score	Opposition Score	Opposition Score	Opposition Score	Rank
Roman Aleksandrov; Fayzulla Alimov; Javokhirbek Nurmatov; Oleg Sokolov	Men's épée	Indonesia (INA); W 45–35	Japan (JPN); L 38–45	Did not advance		6

== Football ==
Uzbekistan competed in the Group B at the men's football event.

Summary

Team	Event	Group Stage				Round of 16	Quarterfinal	Semifinal	Final / BM	
Team	Event	Opposition Score	Opposition Score	Opposition Score	Rank	Opposition Score	Opposition Score	Opposition Score	Opposition Score	Rank
Uzbekistan men's	Men's tournament	Bangladesh; W 3–0	Qatar; W 6–0	Thailand; W 1–0	1 Q	Hong Kong; W 3–0	South Korea; L 3–4	Did not advance		5

=== Men's tournament ===
Roster

The following is the Uzbekistan squad in the men's football tournament of the 2018 Asian Games. The team of 20 players was officially named on 10 August.

Head coach: (Uzbekistan) Ravshan Khaydarov

No.	Pos.	Player	Date of birth (age)	Caps	Goals	Club
1	GK	Botirali Ergashev	23 June 1995 (aged 23)			(Uzbekistan Football Association) Navbahor Namangan
12	GK	Rahimjon Davronov	3 October 1996 (aged 21)			(Uzbekistan Football Association) Mash'al Mubarek
2	DF	Rustam Ashurmatov	7 July 1995 (aged 23)			(Uzbekistan Football Association) Bunyodkor
3	DF	Xojiakbar Alijonov	19 April 1997 (aged 21)			(Uzbekistan Football Association) Pakhtakor Tashkent
4	DF	Akramjon Komilov	14 March 1996 (aged 22)			(Uzbekistan Football Association) Bunyodkor
5	DF	Abbos Otakhonov	25 August 1995 (aged 22)			(Uzbekistan Football Association) Metallurg Bekabad
13	DF	Islom Kobilov	1 June 1997 (aged 21)			(Uzbekistan Football Association) Bunyodkor
16	DF	Doniyorjon Narzullaev	11 April 1995 (aged 23)			(Uzbekistan Football Association) Nasaf Qarshi
20	DF	Dostonbek Tursunov	13 June 1995 (aged 23)			(Uzbekistan Football Association) Neftchi Fergana
6	MF	Jaloliddin Masharipov*	1 September 1993 (aged 24)			(Uzbekistan Football Association) Pakhtakor Tashkent
7	MF	Odiljon Hamrobekov	13 February 1996 (aged 22)			(Uzbekistan Football Association) Nasaf Qarshi
8	MF	Jasurbek Yakhshiboev	24 June 1997 (aged 21)			(Uzbekistan Football Association) Pakhtakor Tashkent
10	MF	Javokhir Sidikov	8 December 1996 (aged 21)			(Uzbekistan Football Association) Kokand 1912
14	MF	Ikromjon Alibaev*	9 January 1994 (aged 24)			(Uzbekistan Football Association) Lokomotiv Tashkent
15	MF	Azizbek Turgunbaev	1 October 1994 (aged 23)			(Uzbekistan Football Association) Navbahor Namangan
17	MF	Dostonbek Khamdamov	24 July 1996 (aged 22)			(Russian Football Union) Anzhi
18	MF	Khursid Giyosov	13 April 1995 (aged 23)			(Uzbekistan Football Association) Bunyodkor
9	FW	Zabikhillo Urinboev (captain)	30 March 1995 (aged 23)			(Uzbekistan Football Association) Metallurg Bekabad
11	FW	Bobur Abdikholikov	23 April 1997 (aged 21)			(Uzbekistan Football Association) Nasaf Qarshi
19	FW	Andrey Sidorov	25 June 1995 (aged 23)			(Uzbekistan Football Association) Neftchi Fergana

* Over-aged player.

Group B

Pos	Team	Pld	W	D	L	GF	GA	GD	Pts	Qualification
1	Uzbekistan	3	3	0	0	10	0	+10	9	Advance to knockout stage
2	Bangladesh	3	1	1	1	2	4	−2	4	Advance to knockout stage
3	Thailand	3	0	2	1	2	3	−1	2	
4	Qatar	3	0	1	2	1	8	−7	1	

Source: Asian Games 2018
Rules for classification: Group stage tiebreakers
14 August 2018
16:00 UTC+7

Uzbekistan	3–0	Bangladesh
Urinboev 23'; Khamdamov 57'; Alibaev 66'	Report

Pakansari Stadium, Cibinong
Referee: Ali Shaban (Kuwait)

16 August 2018
19:00 UTC+7

Qatar	0–6	Uzbekistan
	Report	Urinboev 37'; Alibaev 43'; Khamdamov 47'; Sidikov 49'; Masharipov 54' (pen.); Abdikholikov 74'

Pakansari Stadium, Cibinong
Referee: Kim Dae-yong (South Korea)

19 August 2018
19:00 UTC+7

Thailand	0–1	Uzbekistan
	Report	Urinboev 17'

Pakansari Stadium, Cibinong
Referee: Bijan Heidari (Iran)

Round of 16

23 August 2018
16:00 UTC+7

Uzbekistan	3–0	Hong Kong
Alibaev 27'; Sidikov 60'; Urinboev 65'	Report

Wibawa Mukti Stadium, Cikarang
Referee: Sultan Al-Marzooqi (United Arab Emirates)

Quarter-final

27 August 2018
16:00 UTC+7

Uzbekistan	3–4 (a.e.t.)	South Korea
Masharipov 17'; Alibaev 53', 55'	Report	Hwang Ui-jo 4', 34', 75'; Hwang Hee-chan 118' (pen.)

Patriot Candrabhaga Stadium, Bekasi
Referee: Mohammed Al-Hoaish (Saudi Arabia)

== Golf ==
Uzbekistan entered four men's golfers who competed in the individual and team event. Several national golf associations complained to the Court of Arbitration for Sport that Uzbekistan fielded professional golfers that reserved for amateurs, but the CAS ruled that none of the players were professional.

Men

Athlete	Event	Round 1	Round 2	Round 3	Round 4	Total		
Athlete	Event	Score	Score	Score	Score	Score	Par	Rank
Kanatbek Kurbanaliev	Individual	82	83	82	75	322	+34	69
Sergey Chen	Individual	91	84	92	81	348	+60	81
Roman Ten	Individual	91	77	77	79	324	+36	74
Yevgeniy Li	Individual	78	80	85	80	323	+35	72
Kanatbek Kurbanaliev; Sergey Chen; Roman Ten; Yevgeniy Li	Team	251	240	244	234	969	+105	19

== Gymnastics ==
=== Artistic gymnastics ===
Men
Individual Qualification & Team all-around Final

Athlete	Apparatus						Individual All-around		Team	
Athlete	Floor	Pommel horse	Rings	Vault	Parallel bars	Horizontal bar	Total	Rank	Total	Rank
Khamrokulov Akobir	12.900		13.250							
Azimov Abdulla	12.450	13.500	12.600		11.850	12.300	76.400	15		
Abdurakhimov Rasuljon	12.300	10.950	13.200		13.850	12.850	76.600	13		
Abdusamatov Khusniddin	11.500	9.950			13.100	11.750				
Anton Fokin		11.650	12.750		12.100	13.150				
Team Total	35.850	38.950	38.300	41.250	37.600	37.050			229.000	7

Women
Individual Qualification & Team all-around Final

Athlete	Apparatus				Individual All-around		Team	
Athlete	Vault	Uneven bars	Balance beam	Floor	Total	Rank	Total	Rank
Oksana Chusovitina	14.200		11.800					
Turobova Sabina	11.625	10.200	10.600	11.050				
Team Total	57.875	60.900	57.050	53.475				

Individual

Athlete	Event	Final					
Athlete	Event	Vault	Uneven bars	Balance beam	Floor	Total	Rank
Oksana Chusovitina	Vault		14.287				2nd place, silver medalist(s)

== Ju-jitsu ==
Key:

- ADV – Won by advantages.
- PNT – Won by penalties.
- RDC – Won by referee decision.
- SUB – Won by submission.

Men

Athlete	Event	Round of 64	Round of 32	Round of 16	Quarterfinals	Semifinals	Repechage	Final / BM	Rank
Athlete	Event	Opposition Result	Opposition Result	Opposition Result	Opposition Result	Opposition Result	Opposition Result	Opposition Result	Rank
Akmal Amirov	–56 kg	—N/a	M Ismael (IRQ); W 6–2	S Kuntong (THA); W 13–4	H Nawad (UAE); L 4–4^{RDC}	Did not advance	K Konyssov (KAZ); W 100^{SUB}–0	N Seiduali (KAZ); L 2–4	–
Doston Ruziev	–56 kg	—N/a	G Bayanduuren (MGL); W 4–0	P Singchalad (THA); W 6–0	K Al-Blooshi (UAE); L 0–4	Did not advance	K Meredow (TKM); L 3–6	Did not advance	
Jakhongir Mirakhmedov	–62 kg	—N/a	Bye	S Al-Mazrouei (UAE); L 0–100^{SUB}	Did not advance				
Rakhimjon Subkhonov	–62 kg	—N/a	Bye	AA Uulu (KGZ); L 0–2	Did not advance				
Asadullo Bozorov	–69 kg	—N/a	Bye	A Ahmed (IRQ); L 0–2	Did not advance				
Khomidjon Muminov	–69 kg	—N/a	M Sabba (BRN); W 5–2	N Kazhekov (KAZ); L 0–2	Did not advance				
Ulugbek Otamurodov	–77 kg	Bye	B Erkhbayar (MGL); L 2–4	Did not advance					
Mirali Sharipov	–77 kg	Bye	O Nurtakanov (KAZ); W 2–0	N Alymkulov (KGZ); L 0–16	Did not advance				
Ilkhom Juraev	–94 kg	—N/a	Bye	M Hasan (PLE); DSQ	E Al-Sumaid (KUW); W 3–0	Z Granduke (JOR); L 0–0^{PNT}	Bye	R Makhashev (KAZ); L 4–4^{ADV}	–

Women

Athlete	Event	Round of 32	Round of 16	Quarterfinals	Semifinals	Repechage	Final / BM	Rank
Athlete	Event	Opposition Result	Opposition Result	Opposition Result	Opposition Result	Opposition Result	Opposition Result	Rank
Makhliyo Mannonova	–62 kg	Bye	S Julia (INA); DSQ	Did not advance				

== Judo ==
Uzbekistan participated with 13 athletes (7 men's and 6 women's) in the judo competition.

Key:

- 1st number — Ippon
- 2nd number — Waza-ari
- s — Shido

Men

Athlete	Event	Round of 32	Round of 16	Quarterfinals	Semifinals	Repechage	Final / BM	Rank
Athlete	Event	Opposition Result	Opposition Result	Opposition Result	Opposition Result	Opposition Result	Opposition Result	Rank
Diyorbek Urozboev	–60 kg	Bye	VK Yadav (IND); W 10–00	Yang Y-w (TPE); W 10s1–01s1	Lee H-r (KOR); W 01s1–00	—N/a	T Shishime (JPN); W 01s1–00s1	1st place, gold medalist(s)
Shakhram Akhadov	–66 kg	Bye	Y Bokiev (TJK); W 10s2–00s3	Kim H-u (PRK); W 01s2–00s1	An B-u (KOR); L 00s2–01s2	Bye	A Te (KGZ); L 00s1–01s2	–
Giyosjon Boboev	–73 kg	Bye	A Ayash (YEM); W 10–00s1	V Scvortov (UAE); L 00s2–10s1	Did not advance	Kim C-g (PRK); L 00s1–01s2	Did not advance	
Sharofiddin Boltaboev	–81 kg	Bye	S Azar (LBN); W 01–00s1	T Sakaki (JPN); L 00–10s1	Did not advance	O Uuganbaatar (MGL); L 00–11s2	Did not advance	
Shakhzodbek Sabirov	–90 kg	Bye	S Toma (UAE); W 10s1–00s1	G Altanbagana (MGL); L 00–01	Did not advance	N Elias (LBN); W 01s2–00s1	M Baker (JPN); L 00s1–10s1	–
Sherali Juraev	–100 kg	Bye	R Shrestha (NEP); W 10–00s2	L Otgonbaatar (MGL); L 00s2–10s1	Did not advance	B Hojamuhammedov (TKM); W 10s1–00s1	I Remarenco (UAE); W 10–00s1	3rd place, bronze medalist(s)
Bekmurod Oltiboev	+100 kg	—N/a	Bye	T Ojitani (JPN); L 00s1–11s2	Did not advance	Yin YJ (CHN); W 11–00	J Mahjoub (IRI); W 01s2–00	3rd place, bronze medalist(s)

Women

Athlete	Event	Round of 32	Round of 16	Quarterfinals	Semifinals	Repechage	Final / BM	Rank
Athlete	Event	Opposition Result	Opposition Result	Opposition Result	Opposition Result	Opposition Result	Opposition Result	Rank
Diyora Keldiyorova	–48 kg	—N/a	V Vilayphone (LAO); W 11–00	A Kondo (JPN); L 00–10	Did not advance	Jon Y-s (PRK); L 00–10	Did not advance	
Gulnoza Ziyaeva	–52 kg	Bye	K Devi (IND); W 10s2–00s3	Park D-s (KOR); L 00–10	Did not advance	G Babamuratowa (TKM); W 10–00	Rim S-s (PRK); L 00s2–01s1	–
Amangul Allanazarova	–57 kg	Bye	Kim J-a (PRK); L 00s1–10	Did not advance				
Gulnoza Matniyazova	–70 kg	—N/a	G Chaudhary (IND); W 10–00	T Naranjargal (MGL); W 11–00	Kim S-y (KOR); L 00–01	Bye	Zhu Y (CHN); W 10s1–00	3rd place, bronze medalist(s)
Nodira Yuldasheva	–78 kg	—N/a	Bye	Z Raifova (KAZ); W 01s2–00	Park Y-j (KOR); L 00s1–10	Bye	I Oeda (THA); L 00s2–01s1	–
Rinata Ilmatova	+78 kg	—N/a	IDAM Widari (INA); W 10s2–00	Kim M-j (KOR); L 00s1–10	Did not advance	B Mönkhtuyaa (MGL); L 00s2–10s1	Did not advance	

Mixed

Athlete	Event	Round of 16	Quarterfinals	Semifinals	Repechage	Final / BM	Rank
Athlete	Event	Opposition Result	Opposition Result	Opposition Result	Opposition Result	Opposition Result	Rank
Giyosjon Boboev; Sherali Juraev; Shakhzodbek Sabirov; Shakhram Akhadov; Bekmurod Oltiboev; Amangul Allanazarova; Rinata Ilmatova; Gulnoza Matniyazova; Nodira Yuldasheva; Gulnoza Ziyaeva	Team	Bye	Indonesia (INA); W 4–0	Kazakhstan (KAZ); L 3–4	Bye	South Korea (KOR); L 0–4	–

== Karate ==
Uzbekistan participated in the karate competition at the Games with eight athletes (4 men's and 4 women's).

== Kurash ==
Men

Athlete	Event	Round of 32	Round of 16	Quarterfinal	Semifinal	Final	
Athlete	Event	Opposition Score	Opposition Score	Opposition Score	Opposition Score	Opposition Score	Rank
Ruslan Buriev	–66 kg	J Baasandash (MGL); W 111−000	U Thapa (NEP); W 112−000	S Yuosuf (AFG); W 100−000	Chan H-c (TPE); W 010−001	M Gaybulloev (UZB); L 001−003	2nd place, silver medalist(s)
Maruf Gaybulloev	–66 kg	AA Timur (INA); W 101−000	A Llamas (PHI); W 100−000	M Orazow (TKM); W 101−000	GA Ghanbari (IRI); W 101−000	R Buriev (UZB); W 003−001	1st place, gold medalist(s)
Sarvar Shomurodov	–81 kg	Z Mater (YEM); W 111−000	Z Sultan (KAZ); W 003−000	A Murodov (TJK); W 102−000	E Aliakbari (IRI); L 001−003	Did not advance	3rd place, bronze medalist(s)
Muso Sobirov	–81 kg	M Tokas (IND); W 110−000	B Khojazoda (TJK); L 010−010	Did not advance			
Yakhyo Imamov	–90 kg	G Ahadi (IRI); W 101−001	Divesh (IND); W 110−000	G Begaliýew (TKM); W 010−001	Y Muzapparov (KAZ); W 010−001	S Jandreev (UZB); L 010−011	2nd place, silver medalist(s)
Shermukhammad Jandreev	–90 kg	Bye	S Abdyrahmanow (TKM); W 012−001	S Azizi (AFG); W 110−000	H Misri (KUW); W 111−012	Y Imamov (UZB); W 011−010	1st place, gold medalist(s)
Mukhsin Khisomiddinov	+90 kg	Bye	T Kawaguchi (JPN); W 100−000	Lee P-y (TPE); W 100−000	M Sarwari (AFG); W 112−000	J Pahlevani (IRI); W 001−000	1st place, gold medalist(s)
Nurbek Turaev	+90 kg	J Fadel (LBN); W 100−000	B Temüülen (MGL); W 100−000	AB Rahmani (AFG); W 101−000	J Pahlevani (IRI); L 010−010	Did not advance	3rd place, bronze medalist(s)

Women

Athlete	Event	Round of 32	Round of 16	Quarterfinal	Semifinal	Final	
Athlete	Event	Opposition Score	Opposition Score	Opposition Score	Opposition Score	Opposition Score	Rank
Oysuluv Abdumajidova	–52 kg	Bye	A Makeýewa (TKM); W 011−001	T Azarpeivand (IRI); W 011−002	P Balhara (IND); L 000−001	Did not advance	3rd place, bronze medalist(s)
Gulnor Sulaymanova	–52 kg	HMS Sembiring (INA); W 100−000	A Kaiypkan (KAZ); W 101−000	E Gerelmaa (MGL); W 102−000	M Jadhav (IND); W 100−000	P Balhara (IND); W 100−000	1st place, gold medalist(s)
Mukhlisa Abdumalikova	–63 kg	R Saidi (AFG); W 100−000	Nguyễn TTT (VIE); W 100−000	Lee W-t (TPE); W 010−003	B Baasanjargal (MGL); L 001−102	Did not advance	3rd place, bronze medalist(s)
Dildora Shermetova	–63 kg	N Tener (PHI); W 102−000	N Ahmadi (AFG); W 100−000	Huang S-h (TPE); W 011−001	KN Shifa (INA); W 001−001	B Baasanjargal (MGL); W 002−000	1st place, gold medalist(s)
Dilroza Bozorova	–78 kg	G Amankhanova (KAZ); L 000−100	Did not advance				
Kumush Yuldashova	–78 kg	Bye	S Maulida (INA); W 110−001	K Taizhanova (KAZ); W 101−000	Yang H-t (TPE); W 101−010	O Mönkhtsetseg (MGL); W 101−010	1st place, gold medalist(s)

== Pencak silat ==
Tanding

Athlete	Event	Round of 16	Quarterfinals	Semifinals	Final	
Athlete	Event	Opposition Result	Opposition Result	Opposition Result	Opposition Result	Rank
Ayubkhon Abdullaev	Men's –60 kg	H Havasi (IRI); L 0–5	Did not advance			
Abdumalik Salimov	Men's –65 kg	Bye	M Rahimi (IRI); W 3–0	IC Pratama (INA); L 0–5	Did not advance	3rd place, bronze medalist(s)
Nurulla Saidov	Men's –75 kg	A Rusdana (INA); L 0–5	Did not advance			
Khusankhon Baratov	Men's –95 kg	M Mortazi (IRI); L 0–5	Did not advance			
Munisa Rabbimova	Women's –55 kg	Bye	Trần TT (VIE); L 0–5	Did not advance		

== Rowing ==
Men

Athlete	Event	Heats		Repechage		Final	
Athlete	Event	Time	Rank	Time	Rank	Time	Rank
Jasurbek Mavlanov	Single sculls	8:37.92	5 R	7:59.45	3 FB	7:44.59	7
Shakhboz Kholmurzaev; Shakhboz Abdujabborov	Double sculls	7:17.55	3 R	7:05.19	2 FA	6:48.19	1st place, gold medalist(s)
Uktamjon Davronov; Abdullo Mukhammadiev; Farrukh Astonov; Shakhboz Abdujabborov	Quadruple sculls	6:32.88	3 R	6:29.01	2 FA	6:27.06	4
Sardor Tulkinkhujaev; Alisher Turdiev	Coxless pair	7:33.48	2 FA	—N/a		7:06.11	2nd place, silver medalist(s)
Shakhboz Kholmurzaev	Lightweight single sculls	7:36.73	3 R	7:50.21	1 FA	7:22.43	4
Islambek Mambetnazarov; Shekhroz Hakimov; Otamurod Rakhimov; Zafar Usmonov	Lightweight coxless four	6:59.34	2 R	6:48.12	1 FA	6:38.40	3rd place, bronze medalist(s)
Islambek Mambetnazarov; Anatoliy Krasnov; Alisher Yarov; Shekhroz Hakimov; Shokhjakhon Najmiev; Zafar Usmonov; Otamurod Rakhimov; Dostonjon Bahriev; Dostonjon Khursanov	Lightweight eight	6:13.30	1 FA	Bye		6:12.46	2nd place, silver medalist(s)

== Sambo ==
Key:

- SU – Won by submission.
- TT – Won by total throw.

Athlete	Event	Round of 32	Round of 16	Quarterfinal	Semifinal	Repechage 1	Repechage 2	Repechage final	Final / BM	
Athlete	Event	Opposition Result	Opposition Result	Opposition Result	Opposition Result	Opposition Result	Opposition Result	Opposition Result	Opposition Result	Rank
Islom Akhmedjanov	Men's 52 kg	Bye	K Dzhomii (TJK); L 3–0^{SU}	Did not advance		S Jamalabadi (IRI); W 1–0	IM Muttaqin (INA); WO	K Yamamoto (JPN); W 0^{SU}–0	B Kanzhanov (KAZ); L 3–4	4
Akhmad Rakhmatilloev	Men's 52 kg	Bye	M Wahyudi (INA); W 3–1	B Kanzhanov (KAZ); L 1–5	Did not advance	Bye	S Sangov (TJK); W 3–0	M Ghusn (SYR); W 4–0	K Dzhomii (TJK); W 1–0	3rd place, bronze medalist(s)
Kamoliddin Kholmamatov	Men's 90 kg	Bye	Y Sato (JPN); W 7–0	I Amirkhani (IRI); W 4–1	K Ustopiriyon (TJK); W 5–0	Bye			U Khasanbekov (TJK); W 3–0	1st place, gold medalist(s)
Nemat Yokubov	Men's 90 kg	S Jenghor (THA); W 8–0	UM Uulu (KGZ); W 1–0	A Aitbek (KAZ); L 4–5	Did not advance	Bye	R Esgerow (TKM); L 1–2	Did not advance		
Nodira Gulova	Women's 48 kg	—N/a	Cấn TH (VIE); W 4^{TT}–0	B Oidovchimed (MGL); L 2–2	Did not advance	N Yelmuratova (KAZ); W 2–2	—N/a	AZ Kyzy (KGZ); W 4–0	M Turgunbaeva (UZB); W 5–0	3rd place, bronze medalist(s)
Madina Turgunbaeva	Women's 48 kg	—N/a	A Zaripowa (TKM); W 4^{SU}–0	E Bahrami (IRI); W 1^{SU}–0	G Narantsetseg (MGL); L 0–5^{SU}	Bye	—N/a	Bye	N Gulova (UZB); L 0–5	4
Nilufar Davletova	Women's 68 kg	S Silva (LBN); WO	T Junsookplung (THA); W 8–0	M Amanda (INA); W 0^{SU}–0	D Kudarova (KAZ); W 1^{SU}–3	Bye			D Kuryshbayeva (KAZ); L 0–5	2nd place, silver medalist(s)
Gulmira Ismatova	Women's 68 kg	Bye	H Saied (SYR); W 9–0	M Davaasüren (MGL); L 1–1	Did not advance	Bye	Sakinah (INA); W 0^{SU}–0	N Tomi (JPN); L 0–2	Did not advance	

== Shooting ==
Men

Athlete	Event	Qualification		Final	
Athlete	Event	Points	Rank	Points	Rank
Vadim Skorovarov	10 m air rifle	624.5	8 Q	119.9	8

Women

Athlete	Event	Qualification		Final	
Athlete	Event	Points	Rank	Points	Rank
Sakina Mamedova	10 m air rifle	619.7	17	Did not advance	
Zaynab Pardabaeva	10 m air rifle	610.0	32	Did not advance	
Elena Kuznetsova	50 m rifle three positions	1140	20	Did not advance	
Sakina Mamedova	50 m rifle three positions	1138	22	Did not advance	

Mixed team

Athlete	Event	Qualification		Final	
Athlete	Event	Points	Rank	Points	Rank
Vadim Skorovarov; Zaynab Pardabaeva	10 m air rifle	813.7	14	Did not advance	

== Swimming ==
Men

Athlete	Event	Heats		Final	
Athlete	Event	Time	Rank	Time	Rank
Artyom Kozlyuk	50 m butterfly	24.66	13	Did not advance	
Artyom Kozlyuk	100 m butterfly	54.57	14	Did not advance	
Artyom Kozlyuk	200 m butterfly	2:08.93	15	Did not advance	
Vladislav Mustafin	50 m breaststroke	27.41 (NR)	3 Q	27.72	5
Vladislav Mustafin	100 m breaststroke	1:01.04	5 Q	1:01.49	7
Vladislav Mustafin	200 m breaststroke	2:19.02	16	Did not advance	
Aleksey Tarasenko	50 m freestyle	23.08	18	Did not advance	
Aleksey Tarasenko	100 m freestyle	50.44	15	Did not advance	
Aleksey Tarasenko	200 m freestyle	1:52.02	15	Did not advance	
Khurshidjon Tursunov	50 m freestyle	23.02	16	Did not advance	
Khurshidjon Tursunov	100 m freestyle	49.90	10	Did not advance	
Khurshidjon Tursunov	200 m freestyle	1:53.93	19	Did not advance	
Aleksey Tarasenko; Khurshidjon Tursunov; Vladislav Mustafin; Artyom Kozlyuk	4×100 m freestyle relay	3:27.15	11	Did not advance	
Aleksey Tarasenko; Khurshidjon Tursunov; Vladislav Mustafin; Artyom Kozlyuk	4×100 m medley relay	3:45.64	10	Did not advance	

Women

Athlete	Event	Heats		Final	
Athlete	Event	Time	Rank	Time	Rank
Yulduz Kuchkarova	50 m backstroke	29.50	9	Did not advance	
Yulduz Kuchkarova	100 m backstroke	1:03.77	9 Q	1:03.21	8
Yulduz Kuchkarova	200 m backstroke	2:20.04	10	Did not advance	

== Taekwondo ==
Poomsae

Athlete	Event	Round of 16	Quarterfinal	Semifinal	Final	
Athlete	Event	Opposition Score	Opposition Score	Opposition Score	Opposition Score	Rank
Mavlonjon Rustamov; Jonibek Normamatov; Doniyorbek Akhmadjonov	Men's team	Chinese Taipei; WO	Did not advance			
Maftunahon Tolibova; Marina Kim; Sevara Ishmurodova	Women's team	Nepal; WO	Did not advance			

Kyorugi

Athlete	Event	Round of 32	Round of 16	Quarterfinal	Semifinal	Final	
Athlete	Event	Opposition Score	Opposition Score	Opposition Score	Opposition Score	Opposition Score	Rank
Niyaz Pulatov	Men's −58 kg	Bye	Huang (TPE); W 30–28	Sawekwiharee (THA); W 23–21	Ashourzadeh (IRI); W 15–13	Kim (KOR); L 24–6	2nd place, silver medalist(s)
Sardor Toirov	Men's −63 kg	Soklong (CAM); W 25–5	Liyanage (SRI); W 22–6	Hosseini (IRI); L 9–29	Did not advance		5
Khojiakbar Zokirov	Men's −68 kg	Muradi (AFG); W 21–6	Bakhshi (IRI); L 4–24	Did not advance			9
Nikita Rafalovich	Men's −80 kg	Bye	Temüüjin (MGL); W 25–7	Hussaini (AFG); W 11–0	El-Sharabaty (JOR); W 4–2	Lee (KOR); W 21–18	1st place, gold medalist(s)
Dmitriy Shokin	Men's +80 kg	—N/a	Bye	Kumar (IND); W 15–1	Kattan (JOR); W 5–4	Rajabi (IRI); L 2–3	2nd place, silver medalist(s)
Madinabonu Mannopova	Women's −49 kg	Bye	Lam (HKG); W 20–8	El-Haddad (LBN); W 11–5	Yamada (JPN); W 14–11	Wongpattanakit (THA); L 3–21	2nd place, silver medalist(s)
Dinorahon Mamadibragimova	Women's −53 kg	Bye	Aldangorova (KAZ); L 17–16	Did not advance			9
Charos Kayumova	Women's −57 kg	Nadeak (TLS); W 35–2	Siripornpermsak (THA); L 28–27	Did not advance			9
Nigora Tursunkulova	Women's −67 kg	—N/a	Lo (HKG); W 22–2	Liu (MAC); W 0–0	Kim (KOR); L 4–14	Did not advance	3rd place, bronze medalist(s)
Svetlana Osipova	Women's +67 kg	—N/a	Pouresmaeil (IRI); W 6–3	Seavmey (CAM); W 5–3	Deniz (KAZ); L 3–19	Did not advance	3rd place, bronze medalist(s)

== Tennis ==
Men

Athlete	Event	Round of 64	Round of 32	Round of 16	Quarterfinals	Semifinals	Final	
Athlete	Event	Opposition Score	Opposition Score	Opposition Score	Opposition Score	Opposition Score	Opposition Score	Rank
Denis Istomin	Singles	Bye	A Khan (PAK); W 6–3, 6–1	Zhang ZZ (CHN); W 6–4, 6–3	A Bublik (KAZ); W 6–1, 3–0^{r}	P Gunneswaran (IND); W 6–2, 6–2	Wu YB (CHN); W 2–6, 6–2, 7–6^{7–2}	1st place, gold medalist(s)
Jurabek Karimov	Singles	Bye	G Samaha (LBN); W 6–4, 7–6^{7–5}	R Ramanathan (IND); W 3–6, 6–4, 6–3	Wu YB (CHN); L 2–6, 4–6	Did not advance		
Farrukh Dustov; Denis Istomin	Doubles	Bye	M Abid / M Murtaza (PAK); W 7–6^{7–5}, 6–2	Hong S-c / Lee J-m (KOR); L 3–6, 6–7^{8–10}	Did not advance			
Sanjar Fayziev; Jurabek Karimov	Doubles	Bye	H Habib / G Samaha (LBN); W 6–3, 6–1	Hsieh C-p / Yang T-h (TPE); L 4–6, 3–6	Did not advance			

Women

Athlete	Event	Round of 64	Round of 32	Round of 16	Quarterfinals	Semifinals	Final	
Athlete	Event	Opposition Score	Opposition Score	Opposition Score	Opposition Score	Opposition Score	Opposition Score	Rank
Nigina Abduraimova	Singles	Bye	A Danilina (KAZ); W 0–6, 6–2, 6–2	Han N-l (KOR); L 2–6, 2–6	Did not advance			
Sabina Sharipova	Singles	Bye	C Fodor (VIE); W 7–5, 6–3	Zhang L (HKG); L 5–7, 6–3, 7–5	Did not advance			
Nigina Abduraimova; Akgul Amanmuradova	Doubles	—N/a	Kang S-k / Lee S-r (KOR); L 6–7^{5–7}, 7–5, [8–10]	Did not advance				
Sabina Sharipova; Iroda Tulyaganova	Doubles	—N/a	Hsu C-y / P-c Lee (TPE); W 2–1^{r}	M Kato / M Ninomiya (JPN); L 3–6, 3–6	Did not advance			

Mixed

Athlete	Event	Round of 64	Round of 32	Round of 16	Quarterfinals	Semifinals	Final	
Athlete	Event	Opposition Score	Opposition Score	Opposition Score	Opposition Score	Opposition Score	Opposition Score	Rank
Akgul Amanmuradova; Sanjar Fayziev	Doubles	Bye	A Kurera / S Dissanayake (SRI); W 6–4, 6–3	L Kumkhum / S Ratiwatana (THA); L 2–6, 2–6	Did not advance			
Iroda Tulyaganova; Farrukh Dustov	Doubles	Bye	Chang K-c / Hsieh C-p (TPE); L 1–6, 4–6	Did not advance				

== Triathlon ==
Individual

Athlete	Event	Swim (1.5 km)	Trans 1	Bike (39.6 km)	Trans 2	Run (10 km)	Total Time	Rank
Aleksandr Kurishov	Men's	18:50	0:28	57:56	0:20	37:56	1:55:30	13
Javohir Yunusov	Men's	19:55	0:36				DNF	–
Alina Khakimova	Women's	24:20	0:29				DNF	–

Mixed relay

Athletes	Event	Total Times per Athlete (Swim 300 m, Bike 6.3 km, Run 2.1 km)	Total Group Time	Rank
Aleksandr Kurishov; Alina Khakimova; Ekaterina Ryazanova; Javohir Yusunov	Mixed relay	23:29; 26:55; 27:01; 24:15	1:41:40	7

== Weightlifting ==
Uzbekistan weightlifter clinched five medals at the Games. Ruslan Nurudinov who competed in men's −105 kg broke the Asian Games record in clean and jerk by lifting 230 kg, and also in total lifting 421 kg.

Men

Athlete	Event	Snatch		Clean & Jerk		Total	Rank
Athlete	Event	Result	Rank	Result	Rank	Total	Rank
Adkhamjon Ergashev	−62 kg	136	2	162	4	298	3rd place, bronze medalist(s)
Doston Yokubov	−69 kg	145	4	186	1	331	2nd place, silver medalist(s)
Shakhzod Khudayberganov	−77 kg	153	4	—	—	—	—
Sunnatilla Usarov	−85 kg	158	3	182	6	340	6
Ruslan Nurudinov	−105 kg	191	1	230	1	421	1st place, gold medalist(s)
Rustam Djangabaev	+105 kg	203	3	252	2	455	3rd place, bronze medalist(s)

Women

Athlete	Event	Snatch		Clean & Jerk		Total	Rank
Athlete	Event	Result	Rank	Result	Rank	Total	Rank
Muattar Nabieva	−58 kg	98	3	119	4	217	4
Omadoy Otakuziyeva	−75 kg	101	3	136	2	237	2nd place, silver medalist(s)

== Wrestling ==
Men's freestyle

Athlete	Event	Qualifications	1/8 finals	Quarterfinal	Semifinal	Repechage 1	Repechage 2	Final / BM	
Athlete	Event	Opposition Score	Opposition Score	Opposition Score	Opposition Score	Opposition Score	Opposition Score	Opposition Score	Rank
Makhmudjon Shavkatov	−57 kg	M Bilal (PAK); W 7−2	A Lobreguito (PHI); W 11−2	E Bekhbayar (MGL); L 4−5	Did not advance	Bye	Kim S-g (KOR); L 1−5	Did not advance	7
Sirojiddin Khasanov	−65 kg	Bye	B Punia (IND); L 3−13	Did not advance		Bye	A Fayziev (TJK); W 10−0	B Batmagnai (MGL); W 10−6	3rd place, bronze medalist(s)
Bekzod Abdurakhmonov	−74 kg	Bye	M Al-Quhali (YEM); WO	M Hosseinkhani (IRI); W 4−2	Y Fujinami (JPN); W 11−1	Bye		D Kaisanov (KAZ); W 3−2	1st place, gold medalist(s)
Rashid Kurbanov	−86 kg	W Al-Haj (PLE); W 10−0	S Shirai (JPN); W 4−0	O Üitümen (MGL); L 2−6	Did not advance				7
Magomed Ibragimov	−97 kg	—N/a	Yang CQ (CHN); W 10−0	M Khatri (IND); W 8−0	A Karimi (IRI); L 2−4^{F}	Bye	—N/a	T Yamaguchi (JPN); W 6−0^{R}	3rd place, bronze medalist(s)
Davit Modzmanashvili	−125 kg	—N/a	D S Anugraha (INA); W 10−0	N Zolboo (MGL); W 3−0	P Hadi (IRI); L 8−11	Bye	—N/a	S Malik (IND); W 2−0	3rd place, bronze medalist(s)

Men's Greco-Roman

Athlete	Event	1/8 finals	Quarterfinal	Semifinal	Repechage	Final / BM	
Athlete	Event	Opposition Score	Opposition Score	Opposition Score	Opposition Score	Opposition Score	Rank
Islomjon Bakhramov	−60 kg	Lin Y-h (TPE); W 10−0	G Dahiya (IND); W 5−0	S Ota (JPN); L 0−6	Bye	M Mardani (IRI); L 0−8	5
Elmurat Tasmuradov	−67 kg	S Täzäýew (TKM); W 9−0	M R Geraei (IRI); L 8−9^{F}	Did not advance			7
Bilan Nalgiev	−77 kg	A Sulaeman (INA); W 9−0	A Makhmudov (KGZ); L 4−6	Did not advance	Kim H-w (KOR); WO	Did not advance	7
Rustam Assakalov	−87 kg	A Kustubayev (KAZ); W 2−1	S Shirdakov (KGZ); W 9−0	H Singh (IND); W 10−0	Bye	H Nouri (IRI); L 1−6	2nd place, silver medalist(s)
Jahongir Turdiev	−97 kg	Xiao D (CHN); L 0−4	Did not advance		H Singh (IND); W 6−1	U Dzhuzupbekov (KGZ); L 0−2	5
Muminjon Abdullaev	−130 kg	Kim M-s (KOR); W 7−0	S Azizov (TJK); W 9−0	B Mehdizadeh (IRI); W 2−2 ^{PP}	Bye	N Tinaliyev (KAZ); W 8−0	1st place, gold medalist(s)

Women's freestyle

Athlete	Event	1/8 finals	Quarterfinal	Semifinal	Repechage	Final / BM	
Athlete	Event	Opposition Score	Opposition Score	Opposition Score	Opposition Score	Opposition Score	Rank
Dauletbike Yakhshimuratova	−50 kg	Nguyễn T X (VIE); W 12−2	E Narangerel (MGL); W 4^{F}−7	V Phogat (IND); L 0−10	Did not advance	Kim H-j (KOR); L 0−6	5
Sevara Eshmuratova	−53 kg	H Okuno (JPN); L 0−10	Did not advance				12
Nabira Esenbaeva	−57 kg	M Ayuningtias (INA); W 7^{F}−0	P Dhanda (IND); L 1−12	Did not advance			7

== Wushu ==
Men's sanda

Athlete	Event	Round of 32	Round of 16	Quarterfinal	Semifinal	Final	
Athlete	Event	Opposition Score	Opposition Score	Opposition Score	Opposition Score	Opposition Score	Rank
Khaydarov Islombek	Men's 60 kg	Bye	Nghiem V Y (VIE); L 2−0	Did not advance			9
Rakhimov Akmal	Men's 65 kg	Bye	A Kanatbek (KGZ); W 2−0	G Narender (IND); L 2−0	Did not advance		5
Isroilov Azizbek	Men's 70 kg	Bye	K Zhoomart (KGZ); L 2−0	Did not advance			9

Women's taolu

Athlete	Event					
Athlete	Event	Nanquan	Rank	Nandao	Rank	Medals
Darya Latisheva	Women's nanquan and nandao	9.69	3	9.58	7	2nd place, silver medalist(s)
