= Tennis at the 2018 Asian Games – Men's singles =

Men's singles at the 2018 Asian Games
- Venue: Jakabaring Tennis Court
- Dates: 19–25 August 2018
- Competitors: 44 from 22 nations

Medalists
gold medal	Denis Istomin	Uzbekistan
silver medal	Wu Yibing	China
bronze medal	Prajnesh Gunneswaran	India
bronze medal	Lee Duck-hee	South Korea

Men's singles
- Tennis at the 2018 Asian Games

Events
Singles	men	women
Doubles	men	women	mixed
Asian Games

The men's singles tennis event at the 2018 Asian Games took place at the Tennis Court of Jakabaring Sport City, Palembang, Indonesia from 19 to 25 August 2018.

Yoshihito Nishioka was the defending champion, but chose not to compete. Denis Istomin won the gold medal, defeating Wu Yibing in the final. Prajnesh Gunneswaran and Lee Duck-hee won the bronze medals.

== Schedule ==
All times are Western Indonesia Time (UTC+07:00)

Date	Time	Event
Sunday, 19 August 2018	10:00	Round of 64
Monday, 20 August 2018	10:00	Round of 32
Wednesday, 22 August 2018	10:00	Round of 16
Thursday, 23 August 2018	12:30	Quarterfinals
Friday, 24 August 2018	14:30	Semifinals
Saturday, 25 August 2018	14:00	Final

== Results ==
Legend

- r — Retired
- WO — Won by walkover

=== Finals ===
Semifinals					Final
1	Denis Istomin (UZB)	6	6
4	Prajnesh Gunneswaran (IND)	2	2		1	Denis Istomin (UZB)	2	6	7^{7}
7	Lee Duck-hee (KOR)	3	6	5	12	Wu Yibing (CHN)	6	2	6^{2}
12	Wu Yibing (CHN)	6	3	7

=== Top half ===
==== Section 1 ====
Round of 64
Aqeel Khan (PAK)	6	6
Mönkhbaataryn Badrakh (MGL)	1	1
Evgeniy Babak (KGZ)
Shahin Khaledan (IRI)	W	O
Palaphoom Kovapitukted (THA)	6	6
Mubarak Al-Harrasi (QAT)	3	4

Round of 32
1	Denis Istomin (UZB)	6	6
Aqeel Khan (PAK)	3	1
Alberto Lim (PHI)	4	2
13	Zhang Zhizhen (CHN)	6	6
10	Yosuke Watanuki (JPN)	6	6
Shahin Khaledan (IRI)	1	3
Palaphoom Kovapitukted (THA)	3	2
6	Alexander Bublik (KAZ)	6	6

Round of 16
1	Denis Istomin (UZB)	6	6
13	Zhang Zhizhen (CHN)	4	3
10	Yosuke Watanuki (JPN)	6^{5}	4
6	Alexander Bublik (KAZ)	7^{7}	6

Quarterfinals
1	Denis Istomin (UZB)	6	3
6	Alexander Bublik (KAZ)	1	0^{r}

==== Section 2 ====
Round of 64
Muhammad Rifqi Fitriadi (INA)	6	6
Samrakshak Bajracharya (NEP)	2	2
Anthony Jackie Tang (HKG)	6	6
Frederico Sarmento (TLS)	0	0
Yasitha de Silva (SRI)	2	1
Hady Habib (LBN)	6	6

Round of 32
4	Prajnesh Gunneswaran (IND)	6	6
Muhammad Rifqi Fitriadi (INA)	2	0
Ahmed Saai Waheed (MDV)	0	0^{r}
16	Lý Hoàng Nam (VIE)	6	4
9	Kwon Soon-woo (KOR)	6	6
Anthony Jackie Tang (HKG)	0	1
Hady Habib (LBN)	3	6^{6}
5	Yang Tsung-hua (TPE)	6	7^{8}

Round of 16
4	Prajnesh Gunneswaran (IND)	6	5	6
16	Lý Hoàng Nam (VIE)	3	7	4
9	Kwon Soon-woo (KOR)	2	6	6
5	Yang Tsung-hua (TPE)	6	0	3

Quarterfinals
4	Prajnesh Gunneswaran (IND)	6^{2}	6	7^{10}
9	Kwon Soon-woo (KOR)	7^{7}	4	6^{8}

=== Bottom half ===
==== Section 3 ====
Round of 64
Abid Ali Akbar (PAK)	7	6
Anthony Susanto (INA)	5	1
Abhishek Bastola (NEP)	6	3	3
Trịnh Linh Giang (VIE)	1	6	6
Amir Hossein Badi (IRI)	W	O
Farhad Urumbaev (KGZ)

Round of 32
7	Lee Duck-hee (KOR)	6	6
Abid Ali Akbar (PAK)	4	2
Trịnh Linh Giang (VIE)	1	1
11	Denis Yevseyev (KAZ)	6	6
14	Wishaya Trongcharoenchaikul (THA)	6	6
Düürenbayaryn Erdenebayar (MGL)	4	1
Amir Hossein Badi (IRI)	0	2
3	Jason Jung (TPE)	6	6

Round of 16
7	Lee Duck-hee (KOR)	7	6
11	Denis Yevseyev (KAZ)	6^{4}	2
14	Wishaya Trongcharoenchaikul (THA)	4	3
3	Jason Jung (TPE)	6	6

Quarterfinals
7	Lee Duck-hee (KOR)	6	7
3	Jason Jung (TPE)	3	5

==== Section 4 ====
Round of 64
Abdulla Faaih Fazeel (MDV)	1	3
Sharmal Dissanayake (SRI)	6	6
Nazário Gusmão (TLS)	1	0
Jeson Patrombon (PHI)	6	6
Jabor Al-Mutawa (QAT)	3	3
Wong Hong Kit (HKG)	6	6

Round of 32
8	Yasutaka Uchiyama (JPN)	6	6
Sharmal Dissanayake (SRI)	3	1
Jeson Patrombon (PHI)	2	1
12	Wu Yibing (CHN)	6	6
15	Jurabek Karimov (UZB)	6	7^{7}
Giovani Samaha (LBN)	4	6^{5}
Wong Hong Kit (HKG)	0	6^{4}
2	Ramkumar Ramanathan (IND)	6	7^{7}

Round of 16
8	Yasutaka Uchiyama (JPN)	3	6^{6}
12	Wu Yibing (CHN)	6	7^{8}
15	Jurabek Karimov (UZB)	3	6	6
2	Ramkumar Ramanathan (IND)	6	4	3

Quarterfinals
12	Wu Yibing (CHN)	6	6
15	Jurabek Karimov (UZB)	2	4
