= Tennis at the 2018 Asian Games – Women's doubles =

Women's doubles at the 2018 Asian Games
- Venue: Jakabaring Tennis Court
- Dates: 20–25 August 2018
- Competitors: 56 from 18 nations

Medalists
gold medal	Xu Yifan; Yang Zhaoxuan	China
silver medal	Chan Hao-ching; Latisha Chan	Chinese Taipei
bronze medal	Gozal Ainitdinova; Anna Danilina	Kazakhstan
bronze medal	Miyu Kato; Makoto Ninomiya	Japan

Women's doubles
- Tennis at the 2018 Asian Games

Events
Singles	men	women
Doubles	men	women	mixed
Asian Games

The women's doubles tennis event at the 2018 Asian Games took place at the Tennis Court of Jakabaring Sport City, Palembang, Indonesia from 20 to 25 August 2018.

Luksika Kumkhum and Tamarine Tanasugarn were the defending champions, however Tanasugarn has retired from professional tennis in 2016, while Kumkhum chose not to compete in this event. Xu Yifan and Yang Zhaoxuan won the gold medal, defeating Chan Hao-ching and Latisha Chan in the final. Gozal Ainitdinova and Anna Danilina, and Miyu Kato and Makoto Ninomiya won the bronze medals.

== Schedule ==
All times are Western Indonesia Time (UTC+07:00)

Date	Time	Event
Monday, 20 August 2018	12:00	Round of 32
Wednesday, 22 August 2018	10:00	Round of 16
Thursday, 23 August 2018	10:00	Quarterfinals
Friday, 24 August 2018	10:00	Semifinals
Saturday, 25 August 2018	10:00	Final

== Results ==
Legend

- r — Retired

=== Final ===
Final
1	Chan Hao-ching (TPE); Latisha Chan (TPE)	2	6	[9]
2	Xu Yifan (CHN); Yang Zhaoxuan (CHN)	6	1	[11]

=== Top half ===
Round of 32
Thasaporn Naklo (THA); Mananchaya Sawangkaew (THA)	6	6
Altansarnaigiin Jargal (MGL); Erdenebilegiin Ariun-Erdene (MGL)	1	2
Mahika Rana (NEP); Mayanka Rana (NEP)	6	6
Aminath Irufa Mahir (MDV); Zeina Abdul Rasheed (MDV)	4	1
Moyuka Uchijima (JPN); Erina Hayashi (JPN)	1	6	[11]
6	Beatrice Gumulya (INA); Jessy Rompies (INA)	6	4	[9]
Kang Seo-kyung (KOR); Lee So-ra (KOR)	7^{7}	5	[10]
Nigina Abduraimova (UZB); Akgul Amanmuradova (UZB)	6^{5}	7	[8]
Marian Capadocia (PHI); Katharina Lehnert (PHI)	5	5
Gozal Ainitdinova (KAZ); Anna Danilina (KAZ)	7	7
Sarah Mahboob Khan (PAK); Meheq Khokhar (PAK)	0	0
5	Ankita Raina (IND); Prarthana Thombare (IND)	6	6

Round of 16
1	Chan Hao-ching (TPE); Latisha Chan (TPE)	6	6
Thasaporn Naklo (THA); Mananchaya Sawangkaew (THA)	3	1
Mahika Rana (NEP); Mayanka Rana (NEP)	0	0
Moyuka Uchijima (JPN); Erina Hayashi (JPN)	6	6
4	Duan Yingying (CHN); Wang Yafan (CHN)	6	6
Kang Seo-kyung (KOR); Lee So-ra (KOR)	2	4
Gozal Ainitdinova (KAZ); Anna Danilina (KAZ)	6	6
5	Ankita Raina (IND); Prarthana Thombare (IND)	1	3

Quarterfinals
1	Chan Hao-ching (TPE); Latisha Chan (TPE)	4	7	[10]
Moyuka Uchijima (JPN); Erina Hayashi (JPN)	6	5	[5]
4	Duan Yingying (CHN); Wang Yafan (CHN)	6	3	[5]
Gozal Ainitdinova (KAZ); Anna Danilina (KAZ)	2	6	[10]

Semifinals
1	Chan Hao-ching (TPE); Latisha Chan (TPE)	6	6
Gozal Ainitdinova (KAZ); Anna Danilina (KAZ)	0	0

=== Bottom half ===
Round of 32
7	Han Na-lae (KOR); Kim Na-ri (KOR)	6	6
Anjalika Kurera (SRI); Anika Seneviratne (SRI)	1	0
Ghazal Pakbaten (IRI); Sadaf Sadegh-Vaziri (IRI)	6^{6}	1
Csilla Fodor (VIE); Savanna Lý-Nguyễn (VIE)	7^{8}	6
Hsu Chieh-yu (TPE); Lee Pei-chi (TPE)	1^{r}
Sabina Sharipova (UZB); Iroda Tulyaganova (UZB)	2
8	Nicha Lertpitaksinchai (THA); Peangtarn Plipuech (THA)	3	6	[11]
Rutuja Bhosale (IND); Pranjala Yadlapalli (IND)	6	4	[9]
Joleta Budiman (INA); Deria Nur Haliza (INA)	6	7^{7}
Sara Mansoor (PAK); Ushna Suhail (PAK)	3	6^{4}
Dariya Detkovskaya (KAZ); Zhibek Kulambayeva (KAZ)	6	6
Wu Ho Ching (HKG); Ng Kwan Yau (HKG)	2	3

Round of 16
7	Han Na-lae (KOR); Kim Na-ri (KOR)	6	6
Csilla Fodor (VIE); Savanna Lý-Nguyễn (VIE)	1	0
Sabina Sharipova (UZB); Iroda Tulyaganova (UZB)	3	3
3	Miyu Kato (JPN); Makoto Ninomiya (JPN)	6	6
8	Nicha Lertpitaksinchai (THA); Peangtarn Plipuech (THA)	6	6
Joleta Budiman (INA); Deria Nur Haliza (INA)	0	0
Dariya Detkovskaya (KAZ); Zhibek Kulambayeva (KAZ)	4	0
2	Xu Yifan (CHN); Yang Zhaoxuan (CHN)	6	6

Quarterfinals
7	Han Na-lae (KOR); Kim Na-ri (KOR)	3	3
3	Miyu Kato (JPN); Makoto Ninomiya (JPN)	6	6
8	Nicha Lertpitaksinchai (THA); Peangtarn Plipuech (THA)	3	6	[7]
2	Xu Yifan (CHN); Yang Zhaoxuan (CHN)	6	1	[10]

Semifinals
3	Miyu Kato (JPN); Makoto Ninomiya (JPN)	4	2
2	Xu Yifan (CHN); Yang Zhaoxuan (CHN)	6	6
