= Yemen at the 2018 Asian Games =

- IOC code: YEM
- NOC: Yemen Olympic Committee
- Website: yemnoc.org (in Arabic and English)

in Jakarta and Palembang August 18 – September 2
- Competitors: 31 in 10 sports

Asian Games appearances (overview)
- 1990; 1994; 1998; 2002; 2006; 2010; 2014; 2018; 2022; 2026

Other related appearances
- North Yemen (1982, 1986); South Yemen (1982)

Yemen participated in the 2018 Asian Games in Jakarta and Palembang, Indonesia from 18 August to 2 September 2018. Yemen has participated seven times at the Games since 1990 Beijing, and collected 2 bronze medals this far.

== Competitors ==
Yemen participated in ten sporting events with a total 31 competitors. Six athletes (Abdulelah Mones, Ahmed Ayash, Ali Khousrof, Hussein Al-Jarrah, Salem Mohammed, and Zeyad Mater) competed in two sporting events. The following is a list of the number of competitors representing Yemen that participated at the Games:

Sport	Men	Women	Total
Athletics	3	2	5
Ju-jitsu	4	0	4
Judo	4	0	4
Karate	3	0	3
Kurash	4	0	4
Swimming	1	1	2
Table tennis	5	0	5
Taekwondo	2	0	2
Wrestling	4	0	4
Wushu	4	0	4
Total	34	3	37

== Athletics ==
Yemen entered five athletes (3 men's and 2 women's) to participate in the athletics competition at the Games.

== Ju-jitsu ==
Key:

- ADV – Won by advantages.
- RDC – Won by referee decision.
- SUB – Won by submission.

Men

Athlete	Event	Round of 64	Round of 32	Round of 16	Quarterfinals	Semifinals	Repechage	Final / BM	Rank
Athlete	Event	Opposition Result	Opposition Result	Opposition Result	Opposition Result	Opposition Result	Opposition Result	Opposition Result	Rank
Ali Khousrof	–62 kg	—	S Soonthorn (THA); DSQ	Did not advance					
Abdulelah Mones	–69 kg	—	MY Nabi (PAK); DSQ	Z Uranov (KGZ); L 0–100^{SUB}	Did not advance				
Ahmed Ayash	–77 kg	Bye	A Garaýew (TKM); L 0–2 ^{DSQ}	Did not advance					
Zeyad Mater	–85 kg	—	A Abdulloev (TJK); L 0–100^{SUB}	Did not advance					

== Judo ==
Yemen participated in Judo at the Games with 4 athletes:

Key:

- 1st number — Ippon
- 2nd number — Waza-ari
- s — Shido

Men

Athlete	Event	Round of 32	Round of 16	Quarterfinals	Semifinals	Repechage	Final / BM	Rank
Athlete	Event	Opposition Result	Opposition Result	Opposition Result	Opposition Result	Opposition Result	Opposition Result	Rank
Ali Khousrof	–60 kg	Bye	Yang Y-w (TPE); L 00s1–10	Did not advance				
Salem Mohammed	–66 kg	Huang S-t (TPE); L 00–10	Did not advance					
Ahmed Ayash	–73 kg	S Panhga (CAM); W 11s1–00s1	G Boboev (UZB); L 00s1–10	Did not advance				
Hussein Al-Jarrah	–81 kg	MZ Sarwari (AFG); L 00–10	Did not advance					

== Karate ==
Yemen participated in the karate competition at the Games with three men's athletes.

Men

Athlete	Event	Round of 32	Round of 16	Quarterfinal	Semifinal	Repechage 1	Repechage final	Final / BM	
Athlete	Event	Opposition Result	Opposition Result	Opposition Result	Opposition Result	Opposition Result	Opposition Result	Opposition Result	Rank
Ali Al-Madhfari	–60 kg	P Lasasimm (LAO); L 0–1	Did not advance						
Ahmed Garfan	–67 kg	Bye	A Al-Masatfa (JOR); L 0–2	Did not advance					
Adnan Shaif	–75 kg	Bye	Kim M-i (KOR); L 0–5	Did not advance					

== Kurash ==
Men

Athlete	Event	Round of 32	Round of 16	Quarterfinal	Semifinal	Final	
Athlete	Event	Opposition Score	Opposition Score	Opposition Score	Opposition Score	Opposition Score	Rank
Abdulelah Mones	–66 kg	D Damen (KAZ); L 000−100	Did not advance				
Salem Mohammed	–66 kg	H Hadiat (INA); W 100−000	B Khalimov (TJK); L 000−100	Did not advance			
Hussein Al-Jarrah	–81 kg	K Soeda (JPN); L 001−012	Did not advance				
Zeyad Mater	–81 kg	S Shomurodov (UZB); L 001−001	Did not advance				

== Swimming ==
Men

Athlete	Event	Heats		Final	
Athlete	Event	Time	Rank	Time	Rank
Mokhtar Al-Yamani	50 m freestyle	23.80	27	Did not advance	
Mokhtar Al-Yamani	100 m freestyle	51.51	28	Did not advance	
Mokhtar Al-Yamani	200 m freestyle	1:51.14	13	Did not advance	
Mokhtar Al-Yamani	400 m freestyle	3:57.61	12	Did not advance	

Women

Athlete	Event	Heats		Final	
Athlete	Event	Time	Rank	Time	Rank
Nooran Ba Matraf	200 m breaststroke	2:53.11	15	Did not advance	
Nooran Ba Matraf	200 m individual medley	2:34.18	15	Did not advance	

== Table tennis ==
Individual

Athlete	Event	Round 1	Round 2	Round of 16	Quarterfinals	Semifinals	Final	
Athlete	Event	Opposition Score	Opposition Score	Opposition Score	Opposition Score	Opposition Score	Opposition Score	Rank
Ebrahim Gubran	Men's singles	JM Nayre (PHI); L 0–4	Did not advance					
Omar Ahmed Ali	Men's singles	S Wisutmaythangkoon (THA); L 0–4	Did not advance					

Team

Athlete	Event	Group stage					Quarterfinal	Semifinal	Final	
Athlete	Event	Opposition Score	Opposition Score	Opposition Score	Opposition Score	Rank	Opposition Score	Opposition Score	Opposition Score	Rank
Omar Ahmed Ali; Fahd Gubran; Taha Al-Mahaqeri; Muneer Al-Dhubhani; Ebrahim Gubran	Men's	Indonesia (INA); L 0–3	Hong Kong (HKG); L 0–3	South Korea (KOR); L 0–3	Mongolia (MGL); L 0–3	5	Did not advance			

== Taekwondo ==
Kyorugi

Athlete	Event	Round of 32	Round of 16	Quarterfinal	Semifinal	Final	
Athlete	Event	Opposition Score	Opposition Score	Opposition Score	Opposition Score	Opposition Score	Rank
Shihab Al-Arifi	Men's −58 kg	Yousef Abu-Al-Rob (PLE); L 23–64	Did not advance				
Ahmed Al-Khulaqi	Men's −63 kg	Hassan Shubbar (UAE); L 15–18	Did not advance				

== Wrestling ==
Key:

- F – Victory by fall.
- PP – Decision by points – the loser with technical points.
- PO – Decision by points – the loser without technical points.
- ST – Great superiority – the loser without technical points and a margin of victory of at least 8 (Greco-Roman) or 10 (freestyle) points.

Men's freestyle

Athlete	Event	Qualification	Round of 16	Quarterfinal	Semifinal	Repechage 1	Repechage 2	Final / BM	
Athlete	Event	Opposition Result	Opposition Result	Opposition Result	Opposition Result	Opposition Result	Opposition Result	Opposition Result	Rank
Mohammed Al-Maghrebi	−57 kg	Bye	Liu MH (CHN); WO	Did not advance					19
Hussein Al-Azzani	−65 kg	Bye	Kim K-g (PRK); L 0–10	Did not advance					20
Mohammed Al-Quhali	−74 kg	Bye	B Abdurakhmonov (UZB); WO	Did not advance		Bye	M Hosseinkhani (IRI); WO	Did not advance	21

Men's Greco-Roman

Athlete	Event	Round of 16	Quarterfinal	Semifinal	Repechage	Final / BM	
Athlete	Event	Opposition Result	Opposition Result	Opposition Result	Opposition Result	Opposition Result	Rank
Gamal Al-Sabri	−60 kg	W Sailike (CHN); L 0–9	Did not advance				12
Mohammed Al-Maghrebi	−67 kg	A Ismailov (KGZ); L 0–9	Did not advance				14
Hussein Al-Azzani	−77 kg	B Khasanov (TJK); WO	Did not advance				16
Mohammed Al-Quhali	−87 kg	Bye	P Sirithong (THA); W 3–3 ^{PP}	H Nouri (IRI); L 0–8	Bye	Ş Öwelekow (TKM); L 0–8	5

== Wushu ==
Taolu

Athlete	Event	Event 1		Event 2		Total	Rank
Athlete	Event	Result	Rank	Result	Rank	Total	Rank
Saddam Hussein Hussein Al-Rahomi	Men's changquan	7.99	16	—		7.99	16
Yousef Ali Al-Khudari	Men's taijiquan and taijijian	7.80	16	8.20	16	16.00	16

Sanda

Athlete	Event	Round of 32	Round of 16	Quarterfinal	Semifinal	Final	
Athlete	Event	Opposition Score	Opposition Score	Opposition Score	Opposition Score	Opposition Score	Rank
Zaid Ali Wazea	Men's –56 kg	Bye	S Kumar (IND); L 0–2	Did not advance			
Helal Al-Hajj	Men's –60 kg	Bye	E Ahangarian (IRI); L 0–2	Did not advance			

Key: * TV – Technical victory.
