= Lebanon at the 2018 Asian Games =

- IOC code: LBN
- NOC: Lebanese Olympic Committee
- Website: www.lebolymp.org

in Jakarta and Palembang August 18 – September 2
- Flag bearer: Gabriella Doueihy
- Medals Ranked 28th: Gold 1 Silver 1 Bronze 2 Total 4

Asian Games appearances (overview)
- 1978; 1982; 1986; 1990; 1994; 1998; 2002; 2006; 2010; 2014; 2018; 2022; 2026

Lebanon participated in the 2018 Asian Games in Jakarta and Palembang, Indonesia from 18 August to 2 September 2018. Lebanon first competed at the Asian Games in 1978 Bangkok, and the best achievement was in the 2006 Doha, when the country gained a gold, and 2 silver medals. At the last edition in Incheon, Lebanon collected 2 medals, a silver and a bronze.

== Medalists ==
The following Lebanon competitors won medals at the Games.

Medal	Name	Sport	Event	Date
Gold	Ray Bassil; Alain Moussa	Shooting	Mixed trap team	21 Aug
Silver	Domenic Abounader	Wrestling	Men's freestyle 86 kg	19 Aug
Bronze	Ray Bassil	Shooting	Women's trap	20 Aug
Bronze	Laetitia Aoun	Taekwondo	Women's 53 kg	20 Aug

Medals by sport
Sport	1st place, gold medalist(s)	2nd place, silver medalist(s)	3rd place, bronze medalist(s)	Total
Shooting	1		1	2
Taekwondo			1	1
Wrestling		1		1
Total	1	1	2	4

Medals by day
Day	Date	1st place, gold medalist(s)	2nd place, silver medalist(s)	3rd place, bronze medalist(s)	Total
1	August 19	0	1	0	1
2	August 20	0	0	2	2
3	August 21	1	0	0	1
4	August 22	0	0	0	0
5	August 23	0	0	0	0
6	August 24	0	0	0	0
7	August 25	0	0	0	0
8	August 26	0	0	0	0
9	August 27	0	0	0	0
10	August 28	0	0	0	0
11	August 29	0	0	0	0
12	August 30	0	0	0	0
13	August 31	0	0	0	0
14	September 1	0	0	0	0
15	September 2	0	0	0	0
Total		1	1	2	4

== Competitors ==
The following is a list of the number of competitors representing Lebanon that participated at the Games:

Sport	Men	Women	Total
Athletics	1	1	2
Cycling	1	0	1
Fencing	0	4	4
Golf	1	0	1
Gymnastics	0	1	1
Ju-jitsu	1	0	1
Judo	3	1	4
Kurash^{[1]}	2	1	3
Sambo	2	1	3
Shooting	2	1	3
Swimming	1	1	2
Table tennis	1	1	2
Taekwondo	0	2	2
Tennis	2	0	2
Wrestling	1	0	1
Wushu	1	0	1
Total	17	13	30

^{1} 1 men's and 1 women's also competed in sambo.

== Athletics ==
Lebanon entered two athletes (1 men and 1 women) to participate in the athletics competition at the Games.

== Cycling ==
=== Mountain biking ===
Athlete	Event	Final	
Athlete	Event	Time	Rank
Elias Abou-Rachid	Men's cross-country	−4 laps	18

== Fencing ==
Individual

Athlete	Event	Preliminary		Round of 32	Round of 16	Quarterfinals	Semifinals	Final	
Athlete	Event	Opposition Score	Rank	Opposition Score	Opposition Score	Opposition Score	Opposition Score	Opposition Score	Rank
Nai Salameh	Women's épée	Kang Y-m (KOR): L 2–5; Trần TTT (VIE): L 3–5; JS Singh (IND): W 5–1; Megawati (INA): W 5–4; K Oishi (JPN): L 4–5	3 Q	A Alibekova (KAZ); L 4–15	did not advance				19
Dominique Nicole Tannous	Women's épée	U Balaganskaya (KAZ): L 4–5; G Baatarchuluun (MGL): W 5–2; Choi I-j (KOR): W 5–3; H Abella (PHI): W 5–3; J Dutta (IND): L 2–5	2 Q	Nguyễn THN (VIE); L 13–15	did not advance				17
Rita Abou Jaoude	Women's foil	Ho KU (MAC): L 3–5; SK Catantan (PHI): L 2–5; P Thongchampa (THA): L 1–5; Fu YT (CHN): L 0–5; K Miyawaki (JPN): L 2–5	6	did not advance					22
Mona Shaito	Women's foil	L Al-Hosani (UAE): W 5–0; Cheng H (TPE): L 4–5; Jeon H-s (KOR): W 5–0; N Aini (INA): W 5–1; Liu YW (HKG): L 4–5; Ho PI (MAC): W 5–3	3 Q	Bye	Cheng H (TPE); L 12–15	did not advance			10

Team

Athlete	Event	Round of 16	Quarterfinals	Semifinals	Final	
Athlete	Event	Opposition Score	Opposition Score	Opposition Score	Opposition Score	Rank
Rita Abou Jaoude; Nai Salameh; Dominique Nicole Tannous	Women's épée	Vietnam (VIE); L 23–45	did not advance			9
Rita Abou Jaoude; Nai Salameh; Mona Shaito	Women's foil	Macau (MAC); W 45–23	Japan (JPN); L 9–45	did not advance		8

== Golf ==
Men

Athlete	Event	Round 1	Round 2	Round 3	Round 4	Total		
Athlete	Event	Score	Score	Score	Score	Score	Par	Rank
Salim Zein	Individual	85	77	78	82	322	+34	69

== Ju-jitsu ==
Key:

- ADV – Won by advantages.
- RDC – Won by referee decision.
- SUB – Won by submission.

Men

Athlete	Event	Round of 32	Round of 16	Quarterfinals	Semifinals	Repechage	Final / BM	Rank
Athlete	Event	Opposition Result	Opposition Result	Opposition Result	Opposition Result	Opposition Result	Opposition Result	Rank
Daniel Hilal	–62 kg	I Mastur (INA); W 15–0	A Zhanibek (KAZ); W 2–0	F Al-Harahsheh (JOR); L 0–2	Did not advance	AA Uulu (KGZ); W 100^{SUB}–0	S Al-Mazrouei (UAE); L 0–2	–

== Judo ==
Lebanon competed at the Games with 4 judokas (3 men's and 1 women's).

Key:

- 1st number — Ippon
- 2nd number — Waza-ari
- s — Shido

Men

Athlete	Event	Round of 32	Round of 16	Quarterfinals	Semifinals	Repechage	Final / BM	Rank
Athlete	Event	Opposition Result	Opposition Result	Opposition Result	Opposition Result	Opposition Result	Opposition Result	Rank
Steven Azar	–81 kg	H Hadi (IRQ); WO	S Boltaboev (UZB); L 00s1–01	did not advance				
Nacif Elias	–90 kg	Bye	Bu HB (CHN); W 01–00s1	K Ustopiriyon (TJK); L 00s3–10s2	Did not advance	S Sabirov (UZB); L 00s1–01s2	did not advance	
Jad Fadel	–81 kg	Bye	S Saidov (TJK); L 00–10	did not advance				

Women

Athlete	Event	Round of 16	Quarterfinals	Semifinals	Repechage	Final / BM	Rank
Athlete	Event	Opposition Result	Opposition Result	Opposition Result	Opposition Result	Opposition Result	Rank
Suellen Silva	–63 kg	Han H-j (KOR); L 00s1–10s1	did not advance				

== Kurash ==
Men

Athlete	Event	Round of 32	Round of 16	Quarterfinal	Semifinal	Final	
Athlete	Event	Opposition Score	Opposition Score	Opposition Score	Opposition Score	Opposition Score	Rank
Nacif Elias	+90 kg	K Tsogtgerel (MGL); L 001−100	did not advance				
Jad Fadel	+90 kg	N Turaev (UZB); L 000−100	did not advance				

Women

Athlete	Event	Round of 32	Round of 16	Quarterfinal	Semifinal	Final	
Athlete	Event	Opposition Score	Opposition Score	Opposition Score	Opposition Score	Opposition Score	Rank
Suellen Silva	–63 kg	Lee W-t (TPE); L 000−101	did not advance				

== Sambo ==
Key:

- SU – Won by submission.

Athlete	Event	Round of 32	Round of 16	Quarterfinal	Semifinal	Repechage 1	Repechage 2	Repechage final	Final / BM	
Athlete	Event	Opposition Result	Opposition Result	Opposition Result	Opposition Result	Opposition Result	Opposition Result	Opposition Result	Opposition Result	Rank
Nacif Elias	Men's 90 kg	Chuang K-j (TPE); L ^{Dsq}	did not advance							
Steven Azar	Men's 90 kg	Y Sato (JPN); L 1–3	did not advance							
Suellen Silva	Women's 68 kg	N Davletova (UZB); WO	did not advance			T Junsookplung (THA); WO	did not advance			

== Shooting ==
Men

Athlete	Event	Qualification		Final	
Athlete	Event	Points	Rank	Points	Rank
Elie Bejjani	Trap	112	22	did not advance	
Alain Moussa	Trap	117	7	did not advance	

Women

Athlete	Event	Qualification		Final	
Athlete	Event	Points	Rank	Points	Rank
Ray Bassil	Trap	119 EQAsR, QGR	2 Q	34	3rd place, bronze medalist(s)

Mixed team

Athlete	Event	Qualification		Final	
Athlete	Event	Points	Rank	Points	Rank
Alain Moussa; Ray Bassil	Trap	143	3 Q	43 AsR, GR	1st place, gold medalist(s)

== Swimming ==
Men

Athlete	Event	Heats		Final	
Athlete	Event	Time	Rank	Time	Rank
Anthony Barbar	50 m freestyle	Anthony Barbar	26	did not advance	
Anthony Barbar	50 m butterfly	24.94	18	did not advance	

Women

Athlete	Event	Heats		Final	
Athlete	Event	Time	Rank	Time	Rank
Gabriella Doueihy	200 m freestyle	2:09.84	18	did not advance	
Gabriella Doueihy	800 m freestyle	—		9:23.22	15
Gabriella Doueihy	1500 m freestyle	—		17:37.77	9

== Table tennis ==
Individual

Athlete	Event	Round 1	Round 2	Round of 16	Quarterfinals	Semifinals	Final	
Athlete	Event	Opposition Score	Opposition Score	Opposition Score	Opposition Score	Opposition Score	Opposition Score	Rank
Mohamad Hamie	Men's singles	Nguyễn ĐT (VIE); L 3–4	did not advance					
Malak Khory	Women's singles	Nguyễn KDK (VIE); L 1–4	did not advance					
Mohamad Hamie; Malak Khory	Mixed doubles	SA Vongdalasinh / N Kongphet (LAO); W 3–0	Ho KK / Lee HC (HKG); L 0–3	did not advance				

== Taekwondo ==
Kyorugi

Athlete	Event	Round of 32	Round of 16	Quarterfinal	Semifinal	Final	
Athlete	Event	Opposition Score	Opposition Score	Opposition Score	Opposition Score	Opposition Score	Rank
Anna El-Haddad	Women's −49 kg	Bye	Wenren YT (CHN); W 8–7	M Mannopova (UZB); L 5–11	did not advance		
Laetitia Aoun	Women's −53 kg	Bye	N Gurung (NEP); W 23–10	M Halinda (INA); W 23–22	Ha M-a (KOR); L 1–12	Did not advance	3rd place, bronze medalist(s)

== Tennis ==
Men

Athlete	Event	Round of 64	Round of 32	Round of 16	Quarterfinals	Semifinals	Final	
Athlete	Event	Opposition Score	Opposition Score	Opposition Score	Opposition Score	Opposition Score	Opposition Score	Rank
Hady Habib	Singles	Y de Silva (SRI); W 6–2, 6–1	Yang T-h (TPE); L 3–6, 6–7^{(6–8)}	did not advance				
Giovani Samaha	Singles	Bye	J Karimov (UZB); L 4–6, 6–7^{(5–7)}	did not advance				
Hady Habib; Giovani Samaha	Doubles	Bye	S Fayziev / J Karimov (UZB); L 3–6, 1–6	did not advance				

== Wrestling ==
Lebanon entered the wrestling competition at the Games with one wrestler. Domenic Abounader claimed the silver medal after finished in the second position in the men's freestyle −86 kg event.

Key:

- F – Victory by fall.
- PP – Decision by points – the loser with technical points.
- PO – Decision by points – the loser without technical points.
- ST – Great superiority – the loser without technical points and a margin of victory of at least 8 (Greco-Roman) or 10 (freestyle) points.

Men's freestyle

Athlete	Event	Qualification	Round of 16	Quarterfinal	Semifinal	Repechage 1	Repechage 2	Final / BM	
Athlete	Event	Opposition Result	Opposition Result	Opposition Result	Opposition Result	Opposition Result	Opposition Result	Opposition Result	Rank
Domenic Abounader	−86 kg	Bye	C Chamnanjan (THA); W 4^{F}–0	A Gamidgadzhiev (KGZ); W 8–7	A Davlumbayev (KAZ); W 10–9	Bye		H Yazdani (IRI); L 0–10	2nd place, silver medalist(s)

== Wushu ==
Sanda

Athlete	Event	Round of 32	Round of 16	Quarterfinal	Semifinal	Final	
Athlete	Event	Opposition Score	Opposition Score	Opposition Score	Opposition Score	Opposition Score	Rank
Elie Bou Gebrayel	Men's –70 kg	—	M Khan (PAK); L 0–0 ^{TV}	did not advance			
