= Kurash at the 2018 Asian Games – Men's +90 kg =

Men's +90 kg at the 2018 Asian Games
- Venue: Jakarta Convention Center
- Dates: 28 August 2018
- Competitors: 26 from 16 nations

Medalists
gold medal	Mukhsin Khisomiddinov	Uzbekistan
silver medal	Jafar Pahlevani	Iran
bronze medal	Mansour Sarwari	Afghanistan
bronze medal	Nurbek Turaev	Uzbekistan

The men's Kurash +90 kilograms competition at the 2018 Asian Games in Jakarta, Indonesia was held on 28 August at the JCC Assembly Hall.

== Schedule ==
All times are Western Indonesia Time (UTC+07:00)

Date	Time	Event
Tuesday, 28 August 2018	14:00	Round of 32
Tuesday, 28 August 2018	14:00	Round of 16
Tuesday, 28 August 2018	14:00	Quarterfinals
Tuesday, 28 August 2018	18:00	Semifinals
Tuesday, 28 August 2018	18:00	Final

== Results ==
=== Final ===
Final
Mukhsin Khisomiddinov (UZB)	001
Jafar Pahlevani (IRI)	000

=== Top half ===
Round of 32
Daýanç Taganow (TKM)	110
Aswin Pandari Chandran (IND)	000
Nacif Elias (LBN)	001
Khutagiin Tsogtgerel (MGL)	100
Mohammad Ali Zakeri (IRI)	010
Mansour Sarwari (AFG)	014
Frangkling Kakalang (INA)	000
Lee Po-yen (TPE)	100
Nguyễn Châu Hoàng Lan (VIE)	001
Tatsumi Kawaguchi (JPN)	101

Round of 16
Daýanç Taganow (TKM)	010
Khutagiin Tsogtgerel (MGL)	002
Mansour Sarwari (AFG)	100
Bekbol Nurlanuly (KAZ)	000
Lee Po-yen (TPE)	010
Saidzhalol Saidov (TJK)	001
Tatsumi Kawaguchi (JPN)	000
Mukhsin Khisomiddinov (UZB)	100

Quarterfinals
Daýanç Taganow (TKM)	002
Mansour Sarwari (AFG)	011
Lee Po-yen (TPE)	000
Mukhsin Khisomiddinov (UZB)	100

Semifinals
Mansour Sarwari (AFG)	000
Mukhsin Khisomiddinov (UZB)	112

=== Bottom half ===
Round of 32
Christof Hofmann (PHI)	000
Tilek Kuralov (KGZ)	111
Nabimukhamad Khorkashev (TJK)	000
Jafar Pahlevani (IRI)	010
Nurbek Turaev (UZB)	100
Jad Fadel (LBN)	000
Abdul Basir Rahmani (AFG)	101
Mahmood Ridha (IRQ)	000
Billy Sugara (INA)	100
Zunair Bin Zahir (PAK)	000

Round of 16
Tilek Kuralov (KGZ)	100
Hudaýberdi Jumaýew (TKM)	001
Jafar Pahlevani (IRI)	100
Parikshit Kumar (IND)	000
Nurbek Turaev (UZB)	100
Bayarsaikhany Temüülen (MGL)	000
Abdul Basir Rahmani (AFG)	101
Billy Sugara (INA)	000

Quarterfinals
Tilek Kuralov (KGZ)	000
Jafar Pahlevani (IRI)	100
Nurbek Turaev (UZB)	101
Abdul Basir Rahmani (AFG)	000

Semifinals
Jafar Pahlevani (IRI)	010
Nurbek Turaev (UZB)	010
