= Sambo at the 2018 Asian Games – Men's 90 kg =

Sambo competitions

Men's 90 kg at the 2018 Asian Games
- Venue: Jakarta Convention Center
- Date: 1 September 2018
- Competitors: 24 from 16 nations

Medalists
gold medal	Kamoliddin Kholmamatov	Uzbekistan
silver medal	Umed Khasanbekov	Tajikistan
bronze medal	Komronshokh Ustopiriyon	Tajikistan
bronze medal	Alibek Zekenov	Kazakhstan

The men's sport sambo 90 kilograms competition at the 2018 Asian Games in Jakarta was held on 1 September 2018 at the Jakarta Convention Center Assembly Hall.

== Schedule ==
All times are Western Indonesia Time (UTC+07:00)

Date	Time	Event
Saturday, 1 September 2018	10:00	Round of 32
Saturday, 1 September 2018	10:00	Round of 16
Saturday, 1 September 2018	10:00	Quarterfinals
Saturday, 1 September 2018	10:00	Repechages
Saturday, 1 September 2018	10:00	Semifinals
Saturday, 1 September 2018	16:00	Finals

== Results ==
Legend

- DQ — Won by disqualification
- SU — Won by submission
- WO — Won by walkover

=== Main bracket ===
==== Final ====
Final
Umed Khasanbekov (TJK)	0
Kamoliddin Kholmamatov (UZB)	3

==== Top half ====
Round of 32
Sonram Jenghor (THA)	0
Nemat Yokubov (UZB)	8
Murtaz Ali (BRN)	4
Aibol Aitbek (KAZ)	4^{DQ}
Chuang Kai-jen (TPE)	DQ
Nacif Elias (LBN)
Rio Akbar Bahari (INA)	2
Yousuff Daniel Fauzi Cruz (MAS)	1

Round of 16
Nemat Yokubov (UZB)	1
Urmat Mambetzhan Uulu (KGZ)	0
Aibol Aitbek (KAZ)	1
Ruslan Esgerow (TKM)	1
Chuang Kai-jen (TPE)	0
Umed Khasanbekov (TJK)	8
Rio Akbar Bahari (INA)	3
Jasim Qaddoori (IRQ)	2

Quarterfinals
Nemat Yokubov (UZB)	4
Aibol Aitbek (KAZ)	5
Umed Khasanbekov (TJK)	7^{SU}
Rio Akbar Bahari (INA)	1

Semifinals
Aibol Aitbek (KAZ)	1
Umed Khasanbekov (TJK)	1

==== Bottom half ====
Round of 32
Alibek Zekenov (KAZ)	13
Khashbaataryn Tsagaanbaatar (MGL)	2
Thanawat Tampapanna (THA)	WO
Mansour Sarwari (AFG)
Mohd Ezzat Noor (MAS)	1
Yossi Siswanto (INA)	3
Steven Azar (LBN)	1
Yosuke Sato (JPN)	3

Round of 16
Alibek Zekenov (KAZ)	3
Komronshokh Ustopiriyon (TJK)	11
Thanawat Tampapanna (THA)	0
Nurberdihan Orazmämmedow (TKM)	9
Yossi Siswanto (INA)	0
Iraj Amirkhani (IRI)	8
Yosuke Sato (JPN)	0
Kamoliddin Kholmamatov (UZB)	7

Quarterfinals
Komronshokh Ustopiriyon (TJK)	7
Nurberdihan Orazmämmedow (TKM)	1
Iraj Amirkhani (IRI)	1
Kamoliddin Kholmamatov (UZB)	4

Semifinals
Komronshokh Ustopiriyon (TJK)	0
Kamoliddin Kholmamatov (UZB)	5

=== Repechage ===
Repechage round 1
Murtaz Ali (BRN)
Ruslan Esgerow (TKM)	DQ

Repechage round 2
Ruslan Esgerow (TKM)	2
Nemat Yokubov (UZB)	1
Chuang Kai-jen (TPE)	0
Rio Akbar Bahari (INA)	1
Alibek Zekenov (KAZ)	2
Nurberdihan Orazmämmedow (TKM)	0
Yosuke Sato (JPN)	0
Iraj Amirkhani (IRI)	4

Final of repechage
Ruslan Esgerow (TKM)	8
Rio Akbar Bahari (INA)	0
Alibek Zekenov (KAZ)	1^{SU}
Iraj Amirkhani (IRI)	0

Bronze medals
Ruslan Esgerow (TKM)	0
Komronshokh Ustopiriyon (TJK)	3^{SU}
Alibek Zekenov (KAZ)	3
Aibol Aitbek (KAZ)	1
