= Tennis at the 2018 Asian Games – Mixed doubles =

Mixed doubles at the 2018 Asian Games
- Venue: Jakabaring Tennis Court
- Dates: 19–25 August 2018
- Competitors: 70 from 18 nations

Medalists
gold medal	Christopher Rungkat; Aldila Sutjiadi	Indonesia
silver medal	Sonchat Ratiwatana; Luksika Kumkhum	Thailand
bronze medal	Aleksandr Nedovyesov; Anna Danilina	Kazakhstan
bronze medal	Kaito Uesugi; Erina Hayashi	Japan

Mixed doubles
- Tennis at the 2018 Asian Games

Events
Singles	men	women
Doubles	men	women	mixed
Asian Games

The mixed doubles tennis event at the 2018 Asian Games took place at the Tennis Court of Jakabaring Sport City, Palembang, Indonesia from 19 to 25 August 2018.

Sania Mirza and Saketh Myneni were the defending champions, however both players chose not to compete. Aldila Sutjiadi and Christopher Rungkat won the gold medal, defeating Luksika Kumkhum and Sonchat Ratiwatana in the final. Anna Danilina and Aleksandr Nedovyesov, and Erina Hayashi and Kaito Uesugi won the bronze medals.

== Schedule ==
All times are Western Indonesia Time (UTC+07:00)

Date	Time	Event
Sunday, 19 August 2018	10:00	Round of 32
Sunday, 19 August 2018	12:00	Round of 64
Monday, 20 August 2018	14:30	Round of 64
Tuesday, 21 August 2018	13:30	Round of 32
Tuesday, 21 August 2018	13:30	Round of 16
Wednesday, 22 August 2018	15:00	Round of 16
Thursday, 23 August 2018	10:00	Quarterfinals
Friday, 24 August 2018	13:30	Semifinals
Saturday, 25 August 2018	13:00	Final

== Results ==
=== Finals ===
Semifinals					Final
9	Aleksandr Nedovyesov (KAZ); Anna Danilina (KAZ)	6	4	[10]
5	Sonchat Ratiwatana (THA); Luksika Kumkhum (THA)	4	6	[12]	5	Sonchat Ratiwatana (THA); Luksika Kumkhum (THA)	4	7	[7]
11	Christopher Rungkat (INA); Aldila Sutjiadi (INA)	7^{7}	6		11	Christopher Rungkat (INA); Aldila Sutjiadi (INA)	6	5	[10]
12	Kaito Uesugi (JPN); Erina Hayashi (JPN)	6^{3}	4

=== Top half ===
==== Section 1 ====
Round of 64
Kim Young-seok (KOR); Choi Ji-hee (KOR)	7	6
David Agung Susanto (INA); Jessy Rompies (INA)	5	1

Round of 32
1	Yasutaka Uchiyama (JPN); Makoto Ninomiya (JPN)	7	6^{7}	[10]
Kim Young-seok (KOR); Choi Ji-hee (KOR)	5	7^{9}	[6]
Ahmed Saai Waheed (MDV); Zeina Abdul Rasheed (MDV)	0	1
15	Peng Hsien-yin (TPE); Liang En-shuo (TPE)	6	6
9	Aleksandr Nedovyesov (KAZ); Anna Danilina (KAZ)	6	6
Phạm Minh Tuấn (VIE); Csilla Fodor (VIE)	4	4
Alberto Lim (PHI); Marian Capadocia (PHI)	4	4
7	Divij Sharan (IND); Karman Thandi (IND)	6	6

Round of 16
1	Yasutaka Uchiyama (JPN); Makoto Ninomiya (JPN)	6	6
15	Peng Hsien-yin (TPE); Liang En-shuo (TPE)	4	4
9	Aleksandr Nedovyesov (KAZ); Anna Danilina (KAZ)	6	3	[10]
7	Divij Sharan (IND); Karman Thandi (IND)	4	6	[5]

Quarterfinals
1	Yasutaka Uchiyama (JPN); Makoto Ninomiya (JPN)	1	4
9	Aleksandr Nedovyesov (KAZ); Anna Danilina (KAZ)	6	6

==== Section 2 ====
Round of 64

Round of 32
3	Gong Maoxin (CHN); Yang Zhaoxuan (CHN)	6	6
Enkhsaikhany Temüügei (MGL); Battöriin Shinejargal (MGL)	0	0
Pranav Khanal (NEP); Mahika Rana (NEP)	0	1
14	Yeung Pak Long (HKG); Zhang Ling (HKG)	6	6
10	Sanjar Fayziev (UZB); Akgul Amanmuradova (UZB)	6	6
Sharmal Dissanayake (SRI); Anjalika Kurera (SRI)	4	3
Muhammad Abid (PAK); Ushna Suhail (PAK)	2	0
5	Sonchat Ratiwatana (THA); Luksika Kumkhum (THA)	6	6

Round of 16
3	Gong Maoxin (CHN); Yang Zhaoxuan (CHN)	6	4	[7]
14	Yeung Pak Long (HKG); Zhang Ling (HKG)	4	6	[10]
10	Sanjar Fayziev (UZB); Akgul Amanmuradova (UZB)	2	2
5	Sonchat Ratiwatana (THA); Luksika Kumkhum (THA)	6	6

Quarterfinals
14	Yeung Pak Long (HKG); Zhang Ling (HKG)	5	3
5	Sonchat Ratiwatana (THA); Luksika Kumkhum (THA)	7	6

=== Bottom half ===
==== Section 3 ====
Round of 64
Lee Jea-moon (KOR); Kim Na-ri (KOR)	6	6
Abdulla Faaih Fazeel (MDV); Ayani Moosa Kaleem (MDV)	1	0

Round of 32
8	Sanchai Ratiwatana (THA); Nicha Lertpitaksinchai (THA)	6	6
Francis Alcantara (PHI); Katharina Lehnert (PHI)	0	2
Muzammil Murtaza (PAK); Sarah Mahboob Khan (PAK)	3	2
11	Christopher Rungkat (INA); Aldila Sutjiadi (INA)	6	6
16	Wong Chun Hun (HKG); Eudice Chong (HKG)	6	6
Samrakshak Bajracharya (NEP); Anne Mathema (NEP)	1	0
Lee Jea-moon (KOR); Kim Na-ri (KOR)	3	6	[9]
4	Rohan Bopanna (IND); Ankita Raina (IND)	6	2	[11]

Round of 16
8	Sanchai Ratiwatana (THA); Nicha Lertpitaksinchai (THA)	5	1
11	Christopher Rungkat (INA); Aldila Sutjiadi (INA)	7	6
16	Wong Chun Hun (HKG); Eudice Chong (HKG)	4	4
4	Rohan Bopanna (IND); Ankita Raina (IND)	6	6

Quarterfinals
11	Christopher Rungkat (INA); Aldila Sutjiadi (INA)	6	1	[10]
4	Rohan Bopanna (IND); Ankita Raina (IND)	4	6	[6]

==== Section 4 ====
Round of 64
Mohammed Al-Nabhani (OMA); Fatma Al-Nabhani (OMA)	6	6
Yasitha de Silva (SRI); Anika Seneviratne (SRI)	4	3

Round of 32
6	Hsieh Cheng-peng (TPE); Chang Kai-chen (TPE)	6	6
Farrukh Dustov (UZB); Iroda Tulyaganova (UZB)	1	4
Batjargalyn Günbürd (MGL); Altansarnaigiin Jargal (MGL)	1	0
12	Kaito Uesugi (JPN); Erina Hayashi (JPN)	6	6
13	Timur Khabibulin (KAZ); Gozal Ainitdinova (KAZ)	6	6
Nguyễn Văn Phương (VIE); Savanna Lý-Nguyễn (VIE)	2	2
Mohammed Al-Nabhani (OMA); Fatma Al-Nabhani (OMA)	2	2
2	Zhang Ze (CHN); Xu Yifan (CHN)	6	6

Round of 16
6	Hsieh Cheng-peng (TPE); Chang Kai-chen (TPE)	6^{2}	7^{7}	[10]
12	Kaito Uesugi (JPN); Erina Hayashi (JPN)	7^{7}	6^{5}	[12]
13	Timur Khabibulin (KAZ); Gozal Ainitdinova (KAZ)	1	5
2	Zhang Ze (CHN); Xu Yifan (CHN)	6	7

Quarterfinals
12	Kaito Uesugi (JPN); Erina Hayashi (JPN)	7^{7}	0	[10]
2	Zhang Ze (CHN); Xu Yifan (CHN)	6^{4}	6	[8]
