= Rowing at the 2018 Asian Games – Men's coxless pair =

Men's coxless pair at the 2018 Asian Games
- Venue: Jakabaring Lake
- Date: 19–23 August 2018
- Competitors: 12 from 6 nations

Medalists
gold medal	Li Xiaoxiong; Zhao Jingbin	China
silver medal	Sardor Tulkinkhujaev; Alisher Turdiev	Uzbekistan
bronze medal	Yoshihiro Otsuka; Yuta Takano	Japan

The men's coxless pair competition at the 2018 Asian Games was held on 19–23 August at the JSC Lake.

== Schedule ==
All times are Western Indonesia Time (UTC+07:00)

Date	Time	Event
Sunday, 19 August 2018	10:30	Preliminary race
Thursday, 23 August 2018	10:40	Final

== Results ==
=== Preliminary race ===
- Qualification: 1–6 → Final (FA)

Rank	Team	Time	Notes
1	China (CHN); Li Xiaoxiong; Zhao Jingbin	7:30.14	FA
2	Uzbekistan (UZB); Sardor Tulkinkhujaev; Alisher Turdiev	7:33.48	FA
3	India (IND); Malkeet Singh; Gurinder Singh	7:37.20	FA
4	Japan (JPN); Yoshihiro Otsuka; Yuta Takano	7:38.78	FA
5	Kazakhstan (KAZ); Mikhail Taskin; Yevgeniy Vassilyev	7:48.53	FA
6	Indonesia (INA); Rendi Syuhada Anugrah; Mochamad Alidarta Lakiki	8:04.64	FA

=== Final ===
Rank	Team	Time
1st place, gold medalist(s)	China (CHN); Li Xiaoxiong; Zhao Jingbin	7:04.07
2nd place, silver medalist(s)	Uzbekistan (UZB); Sardor Tulkinkhujaev; Alisher Turdiev	7:06.11
3rd place, bronze medalist(s)	Japan (JPN); Yoshihiro Otsuka; Yuta Takano	7:10.53
4	India (IND); Malkeet Singh; Gurinder Singh	7:10.86
5	Kazakhstan (KAZ); Mikhail Taskin; Yevgeniy Vassilyev	7:30.59
6	Indonesia (INA); Rendi Syuhada Anugrah; Mochamad Alidarta Lakiki	7:45.23
