= Tennis at the 2018 Asian Games =

- Venue: Jakabaring Tennis Court
- Dates: 19–25 August 2018
- Competitors: 159 from 23 nations

Tennis at the 2018 Asian Games was held at the Tennis Court of Jakabaring Sport City, Palembang, Indonesia from 19 to 25 August 2018.

Tennis had doubles and singles events for men and women, as well as a mixed doubles competition.

== Schedule ==
P	Preliminary rounds	¼	Quarterfinals	½	Semifinals	F	Final

Event↓/Date →	19th Sun	20th Mon	21st Tue	22nd Wed	23rd Thu	24th Fri	25th Sat
Men's singles	P	P		P	¼	½	F
Men's doubles	P	P	P	¼	½	F	
Women's singles	P	P	P	¼	½	F	
Women's doubles		P		P	¼	½	F
Mixed doubles	P	P	P	P	¼	½	F

== Medalists ==
Event	Gold	Silver	Bronze
Men's singles	Denis Istomin; Uzbekistan	Wu Yibing; China	Prajnesh Gunneswaran; India
Men's singles	Denis Istomin; Uzbekistan	Wu Yibing; China	Lee Duck-hee; South Korea
Men's doubles	India; Rohan Bopanna; Divij Sharan	Kazakhstan; Alexander Bublik; Denis Yevseyev	Japan; Kaito Uesugi; Sho Shimabukuro
Men's doubles	India; Rohan Bopanna; Divij Sharan	Kazakhstan; Alexander Bublik; Denis Yevseyev	Japan; Yosuke Watanuki; Yuya Ito
Women's singles	Wang Qiang; China	Zhang Shuai; China	Ankita Raina; India
Women's singles	Wang Qiang; China	Zhang Shuai; China	Liang En-shuo; Chinese Taipei
Women's doubles	China; Xu Yifan; Yang Zhaoxuan	Chinese Taipei; Chan Hao-ching; Latisha Chan	Kazakhstan; Gozal Ainitdinova; Anna Danilina
Women's doubles	China; Xu Yifan; Yang Zhaoxuan	Chinese Taipei; Chan Hao-ching; Latisha Chan	Japan; Miyu Kato; Makoto Ninomiya
Mixed doubles	Indonesia; Christopher Rungkat; Aldila Sutjiadi	Thailand; Sonchat Ratiwatana; Luksika Kumkhum	Kazakhstan; Aleksandr Nedovyesov; Anna Danilina
Mixed doubles	Indonesia; Christopher Rungkat; Aldila Sutjiadi	Thailand; Sonchat Ratiwatana; Luksika Kumkhum	Japan; Kaito Uesugi; Erina Hayashi

== Medal table ==
Rank	Nation	Gold	Silver	Bronze	Total
1	China (CHN)	2	2	0	4
2	India (IND)	1	0	2	3
3	Indonesia (INA)	1	0	0	1
3	Uzbekistan (UZB)	1	0	0	1
5	Kazakhstan (KAZ)	0	1	2	3
6	Chinese Taipei (TPE)	0	1	1	2
7	Thailand (THA)	0	1	0	1
8	Japan (JPN)	0	0	4	4
9	South Korea (KOR)	0	0	1	1
Totals (9 entries)		5	5	10	20

== Participating nations ==
A total of 159 athletes from 23 nations competed in tennis at the 2018 Asian Games:

- China (12)
- Chinese Taipei (11)
- Hong Kong (8)
- India (10)
- Indonesia (10)
- Iran (5)
- Japan (10)
- Kazakhstan (8)
- Kyrgyzstan (3)
- Lebanon (2)
- Maldives (7)
- Mongolia (8)
- Nepal (6)
- Oman (2)
- Pakistan (8)
- Philippines (5)
- Qatar (2)
- South Korea (12)
- Sri Lanka (4)
- Thailand (10)
- Timor-Leste (2)
- Uzbekistan (8)
- Vietnam (6)
