= Wrestling at the 2018 Asian Games – Men's Greco-Roman 87 kg =

Men's Greco-Roman 87 kg at the 2018 Asian Games
- Venue: Jakarta Convention Center
- Date: 22 August 2018
- Competitors: 12 from 12 nations

Medalists
gold medal	Hossein Nouri	Iran
silver medal	Rustam Assakalov	Uzbekistan
bronze medal	Şyhazberdi Öwelekow	Turkmenistan
bronze medal	Azamat Kustubayev	Kazakhstan

The men's Greco-Roman 87 kilograms wrestling competition at the 2018 Asian Games in Jakarta was held on 22 August 2018 at the Jakarta Convention Center Assembly Hall.

== Schedule ==
All times are Western Indonesia Time (UTC+07:00)

Date	Time	Event
Wednesday, 22 August 2018	13:00	1/8 finals
Wednesday, 22 August 2018	13:00	Quarterfinals
Wednesday, 22 August 2018	13:00	Semifinals
Wednesday, 22 August 2018	13:00	Repechages
Wednesday, 22 August 2018	19:00	Finals

== Results ==
Legend

- WO — Won by walkover

=== Main bracket ===
1/8 finals
Masato Sumi (JPN)	3
Peng Fei (CHN)	1
Harpreet Singh Sandhu (IND)	4
Park Hae-geun (KOR)	1
Azamat Kustubayev (KAZ)	1
Rustam Assakalov (UZB)	2
Samat Shirdakov (KGZ)	WO
Lulut Gilang Saputra (INA)

Quarterfinals
Şyhazberdi Öwelekow (TKM)	4
Hossein Nouri (IRI)	13
Mohammed Al-Quhali (YEM)	3
Peerapol Sirithong (THA)	3
Masato Sumi (JPN)	0
Harpreet Singh Sandhu (IND)	8
Rustam Assakalov (UZB)	9
Samat Shirdakov (KGZ)	0

Semifinals
Hossein Nouri (IRI)	8
Mohammed Al-Quhali (YEM)	0
Harpreet Singh Sandhu (IND)	0
Rustam Assakalov (UZB)	10

Final
Hossein Nouri (IRI)	6
Rustam Assakalov (UZB)	1

=== Repechage ===
Repechage round 1
Azamat Kustubayev (KAZ)	3
Samat Shirdakov (KGZ)	1

Bronze medals
Şyhazberdi Öwelekow (TKM)	8
Mohammed Al-Quhali (YEM)	0
Azamat Kustubayev (KAZ)	6
Harpreet Singh Sandhu (IND)	3

== Final standing ==
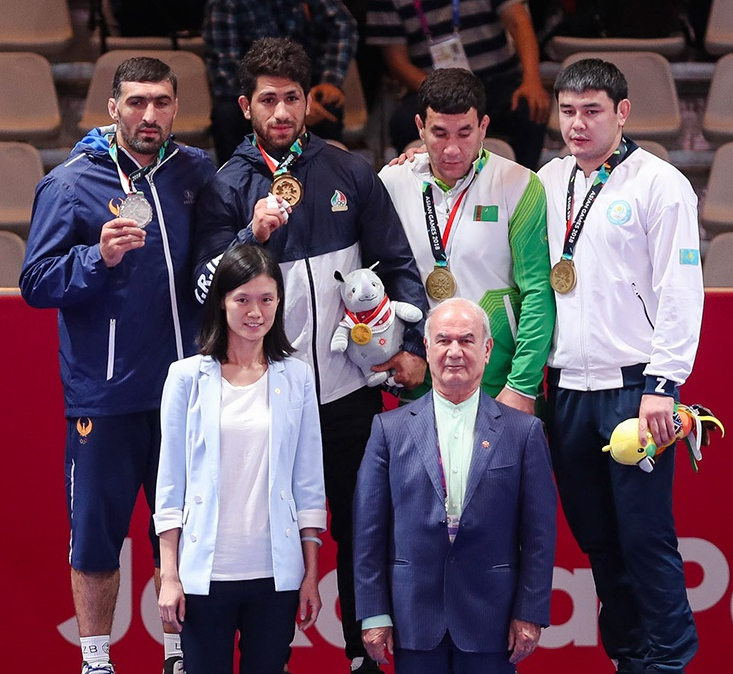
Podium, Left-right: Assakalov, Nouri, Öwelekow, Kustubayev

Rank	Athlete
1st place, gold medalist(s)	Hossein Nouri (IRI)
2nd place, silver medalist(s)	Rustam Assakalov (UZB)
3rd place, bronze medalist(s)	Şyhazberdi Öwelekow (TKM)
3rd place, bronze medalist(s)	Azamat Kustubayev (KAZ)
5	Mohammed Al-Quhali (YEM)
5	Harpreet Singh Sandhu (IND)
7	Samat Shirdakov (KGZ)
8	Masato Sumi (JPN)
9	Peerapol Sirithong (THA)
10	Peng Fei (CHN)
11	Park Hae-geun (KOR)
—	Lulut Gilang Saputra (INA)
