= Kurash at the 2018 Asian Games – Men's 66 kg =

Men's 66 kg at the 2018 Asian Games
- Venue: Jakarta Convention Center
- Dates: 28 August 2018
- Competitors: 32 from 19 nations

Medalists
gold medal	Maruf Gaybulloev	Uzbekistan
silver medal	Ruslan Buriev	Uzbekistan
bronze medal	Chan Hao-cheng	Chinese Taipei
bronze medal	Ghanbar Ali Ghanbari	Iran

The men's 66 kilograms Kurash competition at the 2018 Asian Games in Jakarta was held on 28 August 2018 at the Jakarta Convention Center Assembly Hall. Kurash made its debut at the 2018 Asian Games. Earlier, it was incorporated into the 2017 Asian Indoor and Martial Arts Games.

Kurash is a traditional martial art from Uzbekistan that resembles Wrestling. There are three assessment system in Kurash, namely Halal, Yambosh, and Chala. It is a form of upright jacket wrestling and is played by two athletes, one wearing a green jacket and the other a blue jacket.

== Schedule ==
All times are Western Indonesia Time (UTC+07:00)

Date	Time	Event
Tuesday, 28 August 2018	14:00	Round of 32
Tuesday, 28 August 2018	14:00	Round of 16
Tuesday, 28 August 2018	14:00	Quarterfinals
Tuesday, 28 August 2018	18:00	Semifinals
Tuesday, 28 August 2018	18:00	Final

== Results ==
=== Final ===
Final
Ruslan Buriev (UZB)	001
Maruf Gaybulloev (UZB)	003

=== Top half ===
Round of 32
Jatin (IND)	002
Choi Hee-jun (KOR)	002
Chan Hao-cheng (TPE)	110
Behzad Vahdani (IRI)	002
Mohammed Gamal Salem (YEM)	100
Hendi Hadiat (INA)	000
Şamuhammet Kurbanow (TKM)	011
Bakhodur Khalimov (TJK)	100
Shuaib Yuosuf (AFG)	101
Mirlan Eraliev (KGZ)	000
Nguyễn Hải Ba (VIE)	000
Nurlybek Aldaberganov (KAZ)	015
Ruslan Buriev (UZB)	111
Jargalsaikhany Baasandash (MGL)	000
Upendra Thapa (NEP)	001
Syed Samiullah (PAK)	001

Round of 16
Jatin (IND)	000
Chan Hao-cheng (TPE)	003
Mohammed Gamal Salem (YEM)	000
Bakhodur Khalimov (TJK)	100
Shuaib Yuosuf (AFG)	010
Nurlybek Aldaberganov (KAZ)	000
Ruslan Buriev (UZB)	112
Upendra Thapa (NEP)	000

Quarterfinals
Chan Hao-cheng (TPE)	100
Bakhodur Khalimov (TJK)	000
Shuaib Yuosuf (AFG)	000
Ruslan Buriev (UZB)	100

Semifinals
Chan Hao-cheng (TPE)	001
Ruslan Buriev (UZB)	010

=== Bottom half ===
Round of 32
Aprilianda Adi Timur (INA)	000
Maruf Gaybulloev (UZB)	101
Muhammad Shehroze Razi (PAK)	000
Al Llamas (PHI)	101
Adyaagiin Batsuuri (MGL)	100
Jacky Gahlot (IND)	000
Marat Orazow (TKM)	010
Merajuddin Chakmar (AFG)	000
Abdulelah Mones (YEM)	000
Dauren Damen (KAZ)	100
Ghanbar Ali Ghanbari (IRI)	110
Sanzhar Osmonaliev (KGZ)	000
Mohammad Dashti (KUW)	010
Orifdzhon Dodov (TJK)	012
Kao Shiuan (TPE)	101
Gun Jakwiwattanakul (THA)	001

Round of 16
Maruf Gaybulloev (UZB)	100
Al Llamas (PHI)	000
Adyaagiin Batsuuri (MGL)	000
Marat Orazow (TKM)	001
Dauren Damen (KAZ)	000
Ghanbar Ali Ghanbari (IRI)	112
Orifdzhon Dodov (TJK)	101
Kao Shiuan (TPE)	000

Quarterfinals
Maruf Gaybulloev (UZB)	101
Marat Orazow (TKM)	000
Ghanbar Ali Ghanbari (IRI)	010
Orifdzhon Dodov (TJK)	003

Semifinals
Maruf Gaybulloev (UZB)	101
Ghanbar Ali Ghanbari (IRI)	000
