= Sambo at the 2018 Asian Games – Women's 68 kg =

Sambo competitions

Women's 68 kg at the 2018 Asian Games
- Venue: Jakarta Convention Center
- Date: 1 September 2018
- Competitors: 17 from 11 nations

Medalists
| gold medal | Dildash Kuryshbayeva | Kazakhstan |
| silver medal | Nilufar Davletova | Uzbekistan |
| bronze medal | Tsogt-Ochiryn Battsetseg | Mongolia |
| bronze medal | Natsuki Tomi | Japan |

The women's sport sambo 68 kilograms competition at the 2018 Asian Games in Jakarta was held on 1 September 2018 at the Jakarta Convention Center Assembly Hall.

== Schedule ==
All times are Western Indonesia Time (UTC+07:00)

| Date | Time | Event |
|---|---|---|
| Saturday, 1 September 2018 | 10:00 | Round of 32 |
| Saturday, 1 September 2018 | 10:00 | Round of 16 |
| Saturday, 1 September 2018 | 10:00 | Quarterfinals |
| Saturday, 1 September 2018 | 10:00 | Repechages |
| Saturday, 1 September 2018 | 10:00 | Semifinals |
| Saturday, 1 September 2018 | 16:00 | Finals |

== Results ==
Legend

- SU — Won by submission
- WO — Won by walkover

=== Main bracket ===
==== Final ====
| Final |
| Nilufar Davletova (UZB) | 0 |
| Dildash Kuryshbayeva (KAZ) | 5 |

==== Top half ====
Round of 32
Nilufar Davletova (UZB) | WO
Suellen Silva (LBN)

Round of 16
Nilufar Davletova (UZB) | 8
Titapa Junsookplung (THA) | 0
Mutiara Amanda (INA) | 5
Zyba Orunowa (TKM) | 1
Dinara Kudarova (KAZ) | 3
Tsogt-Ochiryn Battsetseg (MGL) | 3
Aizhan Kadyrbekova (KGZ) | 1
Akram Khani (IRI) | 0

Quarterfinals
Nilufar Davletova (UZB) | 0^{SU}
Mutiara Amanda (INA) | 0
Dinara Kudarova (KAZ) | 3
Aizhan Kadyrbekova (KGZ) | 1

Semifinals
Nilufar Davletova (UZB) | 1^{SU}
Dinara Kudarova (KAZ) | 3

==== Bottom half ====
Round of 32

Round of 16
Dildash Kuryshbayeva (KAZ) | 4^{SU}
Anara Estebesova (KGZ) | 1
Saitan Somching (THA) | 0
Natsuki Tomi (JPN) | 9
Gulmira Ismatova (UZB) | 9
Hasna Saied (SYR) | 0
Sakinah (INA) | 0
Mönkhbatyn Davaasüren (MGL) | 3

Quarterfinals
Dildash Kuryshbayeva (KAZ) | 1
Natsuki Tomi (JPN) | 0
Gulmira Ismatova (UZB) | 1
Mönkhbatyn Davaasüren (MGL) | 1

Semifinals
Dildash Kuryshbayeva (KAZ) | 3
Mönkhbatyn Davaasüren (MGL) | 1

=== Repechage ===
Repechage round 1
Suellen Silva (LBN)
Titapa Junsookplung (THA) | WO

Repechage round 2
Titapa Junsookplung (THA) | 3
Mutiara Amanda (INA) | 0
Tsogt-Ochiryn Battsetseg (MGL) | 10
Aizhan Kadyrbekova (KGZ) | 2
Anara Estebesova (KGZ) | 0
Natsuki Tomi (JPN) | 4^{SU}
Sakinah (INA) | 0
Gulmira Ismatova (UZB) | 0^{SU}

Final of repechage
Titapa Junsookplung (THA) | 0
Tsogt-Ochiryn Battsetseg (MGL) | 8
Natsuki Tomi (JPN) | 2
Gulmira Ismatova (UZB) | 0

Bronze medals
Tsogt-Ochiryn Battsetseg (MGL) | 3
Mönkhbatyn Davaasüren (MGL) | 0
Natsuki Tomi (JPN) | 8
Dinara Kudarova (KAZ) | 1
