= Kurash at the 2018 Asian Games – Women's 63 kg =

Women's 63 kg at the 2018 Asian Games
- Venue: Jakarta Convention Center
- Dates: 29 August 2018
- Competitors: 25 from 15 nations

Medalists
gold medal	Dildora Shermetova	Uzbekistan
silver medal	Bayarbatyn Baasanjargal	Mongolia
bronze medal	Khasani Najmu Shifa	Indonesia
bronze medal	Mukhlisa Abdumalikova	Uzbekistan

The women's Kurash 63 kilograms competition at the 2018 Asian Games in Jakarta, Indonesia was held on 29 August at the JCC Assembly Hall.

Kurash is a traditional martial art from Uzbekistan that resembles wrestling. There are three assessment system in Kurash, namely Halal, Yambosh, and Chala. Halal is if an athlete Kurash is able to slam his opponent in the back. Yambosh is the imperfect of Halal, two Yambosh same as Halal.

== Schedule ==
All times are Western Indonesia Time (UTC+07:00)

Date	Time	Event
Wednesday, 29 August 2018	14:00	Round of 32
Wednesday, 29 August 2018	14:00	Round of 16
Wednesday, 29 August 2018	14:00	Quarterfinals
Wednesday, 29 August 2018	17:00	Semifinals
Wednesday, 29 August 2018	17:00	Final

== Results ==
=== Final ===
Final
Dildora Shermetova (UZB)	002
Bayarbatyn Baasanjargal (MGL)	000

=== Top half ===
Round of 32
Choi Seo-eun (KOR)	000
Zahra Naderi (IRI)	101
Prapathip Narkkarach (THA)	000
Khasani Najmu Shifa (INA)	003
Nyamsürengiin Undrakhzayaa (MGL)	001
Gülşat Nasyrowa (TKM)	011
Noemi Tener (PHI)	000
Dildora Shermetova (UZB)	102
Huang Shih-han (TPE)	002
Ulzhan Dyussembayeva (KAZ)	001

Round of 16
Zahra Naderi (IRI)	010
Khasani Najmu Shifa (INA)	010
Gülşat Nasyrowa (TKM)	001
Megha Tokas (IND)	010
Dildora Shermetova (UZB)	100
Nafisa Ahmadi (AFG)	000
Huang Shih-han (TPE)	100
Hasna Saied (SYR)	000

Quarterfinals
Khasani Najmu Shifa (INA)	001
Megha Tokas (IND)	000
Dildora Shermetova (UZB)	011
Huang Shih-han (TPE)	001

Semifinals
Khasani Najmu Shifa (INA)	001
Dildora Shermetova (UZB)	001

=== Bottom half ===
Round of 32
Lee Wan-ting (TPE)	101
Suellen Silva (LBN)	000
Mukhlisa Abdumalikova (UZB)	100
Ramzia Saidi (AFG)	000
Mähriban Kurbanowa (TKM)	001
Bayarbatyn Baasanjargal (MGL)	012
Azar Kolivand (IRI)	001
Binisha Nayakattu Biju (IND)	001

Round of 16
Lee Wan-ting (TPE)	100
Siti Latifah (INA)	000
Mukhlisa Abdumalikova (UZB)	100
Nguyễn Thị Thanh Trâm (VIE)	000
Bayarbatyn Baasanjargal (MGL)	001
Jenielou Mosqueda (PHI)	000
Azar Kolivand (IRI)	001
Nazgul Kubasheva (KAZ)	100

Quarterfinals
Lee Wan-ting (TPE)	003
Mukhlisa Abdumalikova (UZB)	010
Bayarbatyn Baasanjargal (MGL)	001
Nazgul Kubasheva (KAZ)	001

Semifinals
Mukhlisa Abdumalikova (UZB)	001
Bayarbatyn Baasanjargal (MGL)	102
