= Abid Ali Akbar =

Pakistani tennis player

- Country (sports): Pakistan
- Born: 22 July 1990 (age 36)
- Prize money: US $3,849

Singles
- Career record: 2–3
- Career titles: 0
- Highest ranking: No. 1,368 (3 October 2016)
- Current ranking: No. 1,884 (18 May 2026)

Doubles
- Career record: 0–2
- Career titles: 0
- Highest ranking: No. 1,484 (18 May 2026)
- Current ranking: No. 1,484 (18 May 2026)
- Last updated on: 22 May 2026.

Mohammad Abid Ali Khan Akbar (born 22 July 1990) is a Pakistani tennis player. He has a career-high ATP singles ranking of No. 1,368 achieved on 3 October 2016 and a doubles ranking of No. 1,484 achieved on 18 May 2026.

Abid received his education from the University of Idaho.

He has won one professional ITF doubles tournament in 2026 in Islamabad, and two national titles in singles and eight in doubles. He is currently studying at the University of Reno.

== ATP Challenger and ITF Tour finals ==
Legend
Challengers (0–0)
ITF Tour (1–0)

Result	W–L	Date	Tournament	Surface	Partner	Opponents in the final	Score
Win	1–0	May 2026	(Pakistan) Islamabad	Hard	(Pakistan) Muzammil Murtaza	(Pakistan) Aqeel Khan (Pakistan) Barkat Khan	6–4 2–6 [10–7]
