= Mansour Sarwari =

Afghan judoka

Personal information
- Born: 30 March 1992 (age 34) Badakhshan, Afghanistan
- Height: 162 cm (5 ft 4 in)
- Weight: 52 kg (115 lb)

Sport
- Country: Afghanistan
- Sport: kurash
Medal record
Representing Afghanistan
Men's kurash
Asian Games
Bronze medal – third place	2018 Jakarta	+90kg

Mansour Sarwari (born 30 March 1992) is an Afghan Kurash practitioner who also practiced Judo and Sambo. He has competed at the 2015 World Judo Championships and took part in the men's +100kg event.

He represented Afghanistan at the 2018 Asian Games and claimed a bronze medal in the men's +90kg event.
