= Archery at the 2018 Asian Games – Women's individual recurve =

Women's individual recurve at the 2018 Asian Games
- Venue: Gelora Bung Karno Archery Field
- Dates: 21–28 August 2018
- Competitors: 68 from 25 nations

Medalists
gold medal	Zhang Xinyan	China
silver medal	Diananda Choirunisa	Indonesia
bronze medal	Kang Chae-young	South Korea

The women's individual recurve archery competition at the 2018 Asian Games was held from 21 to 28 August at the Gelora Bung Karno Sports Complex Archery Field in Jakarta, Indonesia. It was the eleventh time the event was held as part of the Asian Games sports programme since the sport's debut in the competition in 1978. A total of 68 archers from 25 nations participated. Jung Dasomi of South Korea entered as the defending champion, having won the women's individual gold medal at the 2014 Asian Games.

South Korea entered as the dominant nation in the event, having won eight of the previous ten gold medals. They were however upset in the latter stages of the tournament, with their two archers in the elimination rounds, double Olympic champion Chang Hye-jin and top seed Kang Chae-young, being eliminated in the quarter-finals and semi-finals respectively. These defeats led to the first women's individual event final at the Asian Games not to feature a Korean archer. The final was contested between Zhang Xinyan of China and Indonesia's Diananda Choirunisa, Zhang winning in five sets to claim her nation's first ever Asian Games gold medal in the women's individual discipline. Kang recovered to take third place, defeating Lei Chien-ying of Chinese Taipei to win the bronze medal.

South Korea's trio of Kang, Lee, and Chang comfortably topped the 72-arrow ranking round held on 21 August, with defending champion Jung finishing fifth behind Lei Chien-ying of Chinese Taipei. Due to the change in the format of the ranking round, Kang's total of 681 was automatically registered as a new Asian Games record. As per the results of the Korean national selection trials held prior to the Games, Kang and Chang advanced as the two Korean archers to contest the elimination rounds despite Lee outscoring Chang in their 72-arrows to finish one position higher.

The elimination rounds began two days after the ranking round on 23 August. India's challenge ended in the 1/8 elimination round after Kumari lost to Lei by seven set points to three. The 1/8 elimination round also saw Indonesia's Choirunisa receive a walkover after her opponent, 2012 Paralympic champion Zahra Nemati of Iran, was disqualified for arriving at the competition site for the match 30 seconds late. Nemati told reporters that she had been sent for lunch, but shortly after leaving the site was told that the competition had resumed and was not able to return in time.

The top seven seeds each successfully reached the quarter-finals, which began just before midday on 23 August. The match between Choirunisa and Chang featured the biggest upset, with Chang delivering an uneven performance typified by a pair of sevens in her third set and the failure to win the fifth set to tie the game, allowing the Indonesian to take an unexpected victory by seven set points to three and advance to the semi-final. The Korea JoongAng Daily suggested Chang's defeat was due to the pressure placed upon her shoulders from national expectations to win gold medals in both the women's team recurve and the mixed recurve events, in addition to the women's individual recurve. South Korea's hopes of a gold medal were therefore pinned on top seed Kang, who had earlier dispatched Cao Hui of China in four sets to set up a semi-final tie with Cao's compatriot Zhang Xinyan.

The two semi-finals matches held later on the afternoon of 23 August saw two further upsets. Kang's defeat in the semi-finals to Zhang, who held a world ranking of 113, led to the first women's individual recurve final at the Asian Games without a South Korea archer present in four decades of competition. The failure to contest for a fourth successive gold medal in one of the team's strongest disciplines, as well as shortcomings by South Korean athletes in a number of different sports across the Games, led The Chosun Ilbo to describe the national sporting situation as "desperate" in the run-up to the 2020 Summer Olympics. The second semi-final saw Choirunisa triumph against Lei despite a head-to-head record that strongly favoured the Chinese Taipei archer. Choirunisa's win made her the first individual female archer from Indonesia to reach an Asian Games gold medal contest. The consistency shown by the Indonesian since the beginning of the elimination rounds was noted by Edi Purwanto of Pikiran Rakyat as key to her success, particularly in the final four sets of the semi-final when Lei's arrows dropped into the 7 and 8-rings.

After a break of five days, in which the team recurve and mixed recurve events were completed, the competition resumed on the morning of 28 August for the two medal matches. Following the success of Kang, Chang, and Lee in the women's team recurve over Chinese Taipei the previous morning, Kang added a second medal to her 2018 Asian Games tally by defeating Lei in five sets to win the bronze medal.

The gold medal match was held right after the conclusion of the bronze medal match. In front of a crowd that included the President of Indonesia, Joko Widodo, Zhang claimed the gold medal with a perfect score of 30 in both her first and final set. Zhang's success came despite the Games being only her second senior international competition, her only previous experience being the fourth stage of the 2018 Archery World Cup in Berlin one month earlier. Choirunisa earned the Indonesia's second recurve archery silver medal of the Games after Riau Ega Agata's loss to South Korean Lee Woo-seok in the men's individual event earlier in the day. Following a reapportionment of qualification spots at the 2019 World Archery Championships, Choirunisa's silver medal finish earned Indonesia a place at the 2020 Summer Olympics.

== Schedule ==
All times are Western Indonesia Time (UTC+07:00)

Date	Time	Event
Tuesday, 21 August 2018	09:00	Ranking round
Thursday, 23 August 2018	09:00	1/32 eliminations
Thursday, 23 August 2018	11:10	1/16 eliminations
Thursday, 23 August 2018	11:50	1/8 eliminations
Thursday, 23 August 2018	13:30	Quarterfinals
Thursday, 23 August 2018	14:50	Semifinals
Tuesday, 28 August 2018	09:30	Bronze medal match
Tuesday, 28 August 2018	09:50	Gold medal match

== Results ==
Legend

- DNS — Did not start

=== Ranking round ===
Rank	Seed	Athlete	Half		Total	10s	Xs
Rank	Seed	Athlete	1st	2nd	Total	10s	Xs
1	1	Kang Chae-young (KOR)	343	338	681	40	7
2	—	Lee Eun-gyeong (KOR)	344	336	680	40	17
3	2	Chang Hye-jin (KOR)	335	342	677	32	11
4	3	Lei Chien-ying (TPE)	339	335	674	36	13
5	—	Jung Dasomi (KOR)	333	341	674	34	14
6	4	Tan Ya-ting (TPE)	335	337	672	32	6
7	5	Zhang Xinyan (CHN)	332	334	666	28	8
8	—	Peng Chia-mao (TPE)	330	334	664	29	10
9	6	Tomomi Sugimoto (JPN)	325	338	663	28	7
10	7	Diananda Choirunisa (INA)	329	333	662	25	9
11	8	Lộc Thị Đào (VIE)	330	328	658	30	6
12	9	Cao Hui (CHN)	326	329	655	27	9
13	10	Farida Tukebayeva (KAZ)	325	328	653	22	8
14	11	Linda Lestari (INA)	333	318	651	23	4
15	12	Kang Un-ju (PRK)	325	325	650	22	4
16	13	Kaori Kawanaka (JPN)	326	323	649	28	10
17	14	Deepika Kumari (IND)	330	319	649	22	10
18	15	Nguyễn Thị Phương (VIE)	321	324	645	11	2
19	—	Ayano Kato (JPN)	325	318	643	21	3
20	16	Bishindeegiin Urantungalag (MGL)	331	311	642	21	9
21	17	Promila Daimary (IND)	321	321	642	19	3
22	18	Luiza Saidiyeva (KAZ)	316	325	641	21	8
23	—	Alina Ilyassova (KAZ)	325	315	640	22	3
24	—	Zhai Yuejun (CHN)	317	322	639	21	4
25	—	Titik Kusuma Wardani (INA)	325	311	636	20	7
26	19	Ri Ji-hyang (PRK)	321	313	634	17	4
27	20	Nur Aliya Ghapar (MAS)	315	316	631	18	3
28	21	Thidar Nwe (MYA)	316	311	627	5	3
29	—	Zhang Dan (CHN)	302	324	626	6	11
30	22	Nuramalia Haneesha Mazlan (MAS)	307	317	624	16	5
31	23	Zahra Nemati (IRI)	320	302	622	15	5
32	24	Altangereliin Enkhtuyaa (MGL)	314	307	621	19	8
33	—	Pak Hyang-sun (PRK)	306	315	621	13	4
34	25	Asel Sharbekova (KGZ)	311	309	620	15	5
35	—	Danzandorjiin Miroslava (MGL)	310	309	619	18	7
36	—	Ankita Bhakat (IND)	320	297	617	14	3
37	—	Loke Shin Hui (MAS)	297	319	616	18	6
38	—	Kang Jin-hwa (PRK)	319	297	616	14	3
39	—	Aqidatul Izzah (INA)	310	305	615	14	3
40	26	Waraporn Phutdee (THA)	307	307	614	10	1
41	—	Nyamjargalyn Ariunbileg (MGL)	301	312	613	13	4
42	—	Nur Afisa Abdul Halil (MAS)	302	311	613	13	2
43	27	Nasrin Akter (BAN)	304	306	610	14	3
44	—	Laxmirani Majhi (IND)	307	301	608	16	4
45	28	Wu Sze Yan (HKG)	299	302	601	12	4
46	29	Ada Lam (HKG)	310	291	601	12	4
47	—	Lê Thị Thu Hiền (VIE)	296	303	599	10	1
48	30	Firuza Zubaydova (TJK)	305	292	597	14	4
49	31	Nanthinee Jaehomkrue (THA)	295	302	597	5	4
50	—	Wang Cheuk Ying (HKG)	291	304	595	10	4
51	32	Ety Khatun (BAN)	293	300	593	6	4
52	33	Nicole Tagle (PHI)	285	304	589	14	6
53	34	Jen Kaboksy (LAO)	292	297	589	3	2
54	35	Karma (BHU)	307	280	587	10	3
55	36	Gyanu Awale (NEP)	286	300	586	14	5
56	37	Aiturgan Mamatkulova (KGZ)	292	292	584	5	2
57	—	Beauty Ray (BAN)	288	295	583	8	4
58	—	Karakoz Askarova (KAZ)	293	288	581	7	2
59	38	Zukhro Tagaeva (TJK)	288	279	567	8	4
60	39	Sonam Dema (BHU)	271	289	560	6	2
61	40	Alya Al-Ahmed (UAE)	263	267	530	4	1
62	—	Tsui Chung Yan (HKG)	258	260	518	7	0
63	—	Lo Hsiao-yuan (TPE)	274	236	510	8	5
64	41	Ghalia Al-Blooshi (UAE)	245	258	503	4	1
65	—	Diana Kanatbek Kyzy (KGZ)	226	254	480	3	1
66	42	Nabeela Kausar (PAK)	245	221	466	4	0
—	—	Maria Ahmed (QAT)			DNS		
—	—	Mavzuna Azimova (TJK)			DNS		

=== Knockout round ===
==== Finals ====
Quarterfinals
1	Kang Chae-young (KOR)	29	29	27	28	6
9	Cao Hui (CHN)	26	28	28	27	2
5	Zhang Xinyan (CHN)	30	27	25	28	28	6
4	Tan Ya-ting (TPE)	26	27	26	28	25	4
3	Lei Chien-ying (TPE)	29	28	27	6
6	Tomomi Sugimoto (JPN)	26	27	26	0
7	Diananda Choirunisa (INA)	28	25	25	27	29	7
2	Chang Hye-jin (KOR)	25	28	22	27	28	3

Semifinals
1	Kang Chae-young (KOR)	29	27	27	28	25	4
5	Zhang Xinyan (CHN)	29	27	28	26	29	6
3	Lei Chien-ying (TPE)	29	29	25	27	25	3
7	Diananda Choirunisa (INA)	27	29	27	29	28	7

Gold medal match
5	Zhang Xinyan (CHN)	30	28	27	29	30	7
7	Diananda Choirunisa (INA)	28	28	28	24	27	3
Bronze medal match
1	Kang Chae-young (KOR)	29	29	27	30	30	6
3	Lei Chien-ying (TPE)	27	30	29	28	28	4

==== Section 1 ====
1/32 eliminations									1/16 eliminations							1/8 eliminations
									1	Kang Chae-young (KOR)	28	26	28	30	6
33	Nicole Tagle (PHI)	29	25	21	24	23	10	6	33	Nicole Tagle (PHI)	26	27	26	18	2
32	Ety Khatun (BAN)	24	25	26	25	21	5	5								1	Kang Chae-young (KOR)	28	28	27	28	29	7
																16	Bishindeegiin Urantungalag (MGL)	29	27	27	27	24	3
									17	Promila Daimary (IND)	24	29	27	27	2
									16	Bishindeegiin Urantungalag (MGL)	25	29	28	27	6

==== Section 2 ====
1/32 eliminations							1/16 eliminations								1/8 eliminations
							9	Cao Hui (CHN)	26	25	26	28		7
41	Ghalia Al-Blooshi (UAE)	17	10	17		0	24	Altangereliin Enkhtuyaa (MGL)	26	24	25	24		1
24	Altangereliin Enkhtuyaa (MGL)	27	25	26		6									9	Cao Hui (CHN)	24	28	27	29	27	6
25	Asel Sharbekova (KGZ)	25	27	25	26	6									8	Lộc Thị Đào (VIE)	27	26	29	27	25	4
40	Alya Al-Ahmed (UAE)	19	23	28	20	2	25	Asel Sharbekova (KGZ)	24	30	27	23	23	4
							8	Lộc Thị Đào (VIE)	30	26	26	28	28	6

==== Section 3 ====
1/32 eliminations									1/16 eliminations								1/8 eliminations
									5	Zhang Xinyan (CHN)	27	27	29			6
37	Aiturgan Mamatkulova (KGZ)	26	27	26	21	27	8	5	28	Wu Sze Yan (HKG)	22	24	24			0
28	Wu Sze Yan (HKG)	30	23	26	25	24	10	6									5	Zhang Xinyan (CHN)	26	28	27	6
																	21	Thidar Nwe (MYA)	23	26	26	0
									21	Thidar Nwe (MYA)	25	27	27	25	26	7
									12	Kang Un-ju (PRK)	23	27	26	27	25	3

==== Section 4 ====
1/32 eliminations							1/16 eliminations						1/8 eliminations
							13	Kaori Kawanaka (JPN)	20	27	26	6
							20	Nur Aliya Ghapar (MAS)	19	24	11	0
													13	Kaori Kawanaka (JPN)	26	25	26	27	1
29	Ada Lam (HKG)	27	27	21	28	6							4	Tan Ya-ting (TPE)	26	28	28	28	7
36	Gyanu Awale (NEP)	22	23	26	23	2	29	Ada Lam (HKG)	24	25	27	0
							4	Tan Ya-ting (TPE)	28	28	28	6

==== Section 5 ====
1/32 eliminations								1/16 eliminations							1/8 eliminations
								3	Lei Chien-ying (TPE)	29	29	30		6
35	Karma (BHU)	20	21	25	22	26	3	30	Firuza Zubaydova (TJK)	27	23	22		0
30	Firuza Zubaydova (TJK)	25	23	23	22	27	7								3	Lei Chien-ying (TPE)	27	29	28	28	29	7
															14	Deepika Kumari (IND)	29	29	24	27	25	3
								19	Ri Ji-hyang (PRK)	26	26	26	25	2
								14	Deepika Kumari (IND)	29	25	28	27	6

==== Section 6 ====
1/32 eliminations							1/16 eliminations								1/8 eliminations
							11	Linda Lestari (INA)	23	27	26	25	24	6
							22	Nuramalia Haneesha Mazlan (MAS)	26	29	25	24	22	4
															11	Linda Lestari (INA)	25	29	21	25	2
27	Nasrin Akter (BAN)	23	26	26	25	2									6	Tomomi Sugimoto (JPN)	26	26	28	28	6
38	Zukhro Tagaeva (TJK)	26	27	23	26	6	38	Zukhro Tagaeva (TJK)	24	25	22			0
							6	Tomomi Sugimoto (JPN)	27	29	28			6

==== Section 7 ====
1/32 eliminations								1/16 eliminations									1/8 eliminations
								7	Diananda Choirunisa (INA)	28	27	27	26	27		6
39	Sonam Dema (BHU)	26	27	27	24	23	6	39	Sonam Dema (BHU)	26	27	29	24	27		4
26	Waraporn Phutdee (THA)	24	27	24	26	23	4										7	Diananda Choirunisa (INA)
23	Zahra Nemati (IRI)	27	26	28			6										23	Zahra Nemati (IRI)	D	N	S
42	Nabeela Kausar (PAK)	13	21	19			0	23	Zahra Nemati (IRI)	27	29	28	26	23	9^{*}	6
								10	Farida Tukebayeva (KAZ)	27	28	28	26	26	9	5

==== Section 8 ====
1/32 eliminations									1/16 eliminations							1/8 eliminations
									15	Nguyễn Thị Phương (VIE)	28	25	27	25	6
									18	Luiza Saidiyeva (KAZ)	24	28	25	24	2
																15	Nguyễn Thị Phương (VIE)	28	27	26	28	27	4
31	Nanthinee Jaehomkrue (THA)	29	26	28	18	24	8	5								2	Chang Hye-jin (KOR)	28	25	29	28	28	6
34	Jen Kaboksy (LAO)	23	26	26	27	26	10	6	34	Jen Kaboksy (LAO)	22	27	20		0
									2	Chang Hye-jin (KOR)	29	28	28		6
