= Wrestling at the 2018 Asian Games – Men's Greco-Roman 77 kg =

Men's Greco-Roman 77 kg at the 2018 Asian Games
- Venue: Jakarta Convention Center
- Date: 22 August 2018
- Competitors: 16 from 16 nations

Medalists
gold medal	Mohammad Ali Geraei	Iran
silver medal	Akzhol Makhmudov	Kyrgyzstan
bronze medal	Kim Hyeon-woo	South Korea
bronze medal	Yang Bin	China

The men's Greco-Roman 77 kilograms wrestling competition at the 2018 Asian Games in Jakarta was held on 22 August 2018 at the Jakarta Convention Center Assembly Hall.

== Schedule ==
All times are Western Indonesia Time (UTC+07:00)

Date	Time	Event
Wednesday, 22 August 2018	13:00	1/8 finals
Wednesday, 22 August 2018	13:00	Quarterfinals
Wednesday, 22 August 2018	13:00	Semifinals
Wednesday, 22 August 2018	13:00	Repechages
Wednesday, 22 August 2018	19:00	Finals

== Results ==
Legend

- C — Won by 3 cautions given to the opponent
- F — Won by fall
- WO — Won by walkover

=== Main bracket ===
1/8 finals
Şermet Permanow (TKM)	5
Bakhit Sharif Badr (QAT)	0
Hussein Al-Azzani (YEM)
Bakhtovar Khasanov (TJK)	WO
Kim Hyeon-woo (KOR)	3
Akzhol Makhmudov (KGZ)	7
Andika Sulaeman (INA)	0
Bilan Nalgiev (UZB)	9
Yang Bin (CHN)	0
Mohammad Ali Geraei (IRI)	8
Apichai Natal (THA)	0
Gurpreet Singh (IND)	9
Jefferson Manatad (PHI)	0
Askhat Dilmukhamedov (KAZ)	8
Shohei Yabiku (JPN)	9^{F}
Nguyễn Bá Sơn (VIE)	0

Quarterfinals
Şermet Permanow (TKM)	5^{F}
Bakhtovar Khasanov (TJK)	0
Akzhol Makhmudov (KGZ)	6
Bilan Nalgiev (UZB)	4
Mohammad Ali Geraei (IRI)	8
Gurpreet Singh (IND)	6
Askhat Dilmukhamedov (KAZ)	3
Shohei Yabiku (JPN)	3

Semifinals
Şermet Permanow (TKM)	0
Akzhol Makhmudov (KGZ)	8
Mohammad Ali Geraei (IRI)	8
Shohei Yabiku (JPN)	1

Final
Akzhol Makhmudov (KGZ)	3
Mohammad Ali Geraei (IRI)	7

=== Repechage ===
Repechage round 1
Kim Hyeon-woo (KOR)	WO
Bilan Nalgiev (UZB)
Yang Bin (CHN)	9^{C}
Gurpreet Singh (IND)	1

Bronze medals
Kim Hyeon-woo (KOR)	9
Şermet Permanow (TKM)	0
Yang Bin (CHN)	4
Shohei Yabiku (JPN)	3

== Final standing ==
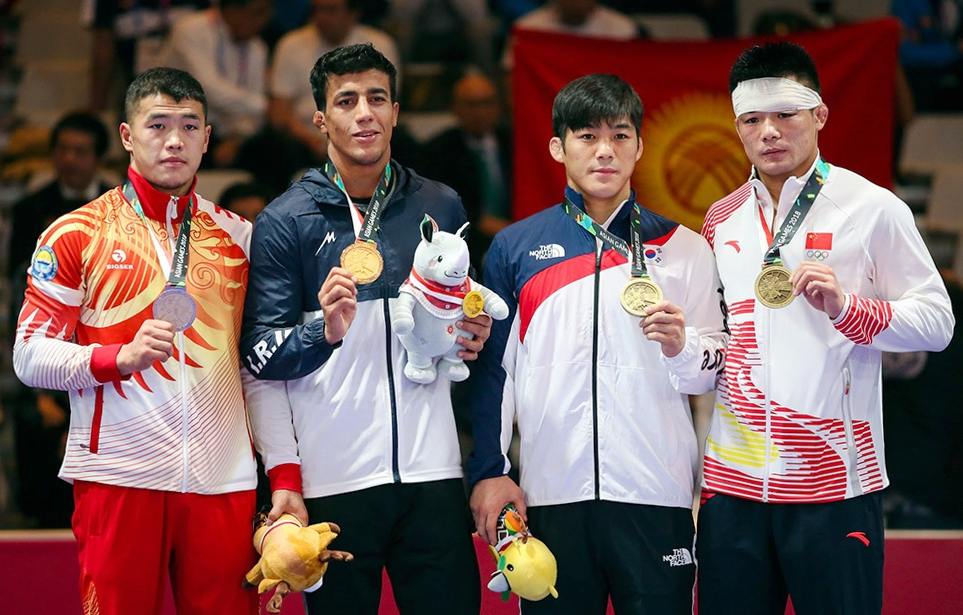
Podium, Left-right: Makhmudov, Geraei, Kim, Yang

Rank	Athlete
1st place, gold medalist(s)	Mohammad Ali Geraei (IRI)
2nd place, silver medalist(s)	Akzhol Makhmudov (KGZ)
3rd place, bronze medalist(s)	Kim Hyeon-woo (KOR)
3rd place, bronze medalist(s)	Yang Bin (CHN)
5	Şermet Permanow (TKM)
5	Shohei Yabiku (JPN)
7	Gurpreet Singh (IND)
8	Bilan Nalgiev (UZB)
9	Askhat Dilmukhamedov (KAZ)
10	Bakhtovar Khasanov (TJK)
11	Bakhit Sharif Badr (QAT)
12	Jefferson Manatad (PHI)
13	Apichai Natal (THA)
13	Nguyễn Bá Sơn (VIE)
13	Andika Sulaeman (INA)
—	Hussein Al-Azzani (YEM)
