= Swimming at the 2018 Asian Games – Men's 50 metre butterfly =

Men's 50 metre butterfly at the 2018 Asian Games
- Venue: Gelora Bung Karno Aquatic Stadium
- Date: 23 August 2018
- Competitors: 41 from 28 nations

Medalists
gold medal	Joseph Schooling	Singapore
silver medal	Wang Peng	China
bronze medal	Adilbek Mussin	Kazakhstan

The men's 50 metre butterfly event at the 2018 Asian Games took place on 23 August at the Gelora Bung Karno Aquatic Stadium.

== Schedule ==
All times are Western Indonesia Time (UTC+07:00)

Date	Time	Event
Thursday, 23 August 2018	09:00	Heats
Thursday, 23 August 2018	18:00	Final

== Records ==
Prior to this competition, the existing world, Asian and Games records were as follows.

World Record	Andriy Govorov (UKR)	22.27	Rome, Italy	1 July 2018
Asian Record	Joseph Schooling (SGP)	22.93	Budapest, Hungary	23 July 2017
Games Record	Shi Yang (CHN)	23.46	Incheon, South Korea	25 September 2014

== Results ==
Legend

- DNS — Did not start

=== Heats ===
Rank	Heat	Athlete	Time	Notes
1	6	Joseph Schooling (SGP)	23.84	
2	6	Wang Peng (CHN)	23.89	
3	5	Adilbek Mussin (KAZ)	23.91	
4	5	Shunichi Nakao (JPN)	23.98	
5	2	Virdhawal Khade (IND)	24.09	
6	4	Li Zhuhao (CHN)	24.13	
7	6	Yuki Kobori (JPN)	24.17	
8	2	Paul Lê Nguyễn (VIE)	24.21	
9	4	Teong Tzen Wei (SGP)	24.28	
10	5	Glenn Victor Sutanto (INA)	24.36	
11	6	Chang Gyu-cheol (KOR)	24.44	
12	4	Triady Fauzi Sidiq (INA)	24.46	
13	5	Artyom Kozlyuk (UZB)	24.66	
14	4	Seo Min-suk (KOR)	24.71	
15	6	Lin Chien-liang (TPE)	24.74	
16	5	Chu Chen-ping (TPE)	24.84	
17	6	Abbas Qali (KUW)	24.87	
18	4	Anthony Barbar (LBN)	24.94	
18	5	Vladislav Shuliko (KGZ)	24.94	
20	5	Mehdi Ansari (IRI)	24.95	
21	6	Chan Jie (MAS)	24.96	
22	3	Navaphat Wongcharoen (THA)	25.06	
23	4	Ho Tin Long (HKG)	25.09	
24	4	Waleed Abdulrazzaq (KUW)	25.12	
25	3	Akalanka Peiris (SRI)	25.20	
26	4	Cherantha de Silva (SRI)	25.36	
27	6	Derick Ng (HKG)	25.42	
28	1	Anshul Kothari (IND)	25.45	
29	3	Noah Al-Khulaifi (QAT)	25.70	
30	2	Yousif Bu Arish (KSA)	25.74	
31	3	Sio Ka Kun (MAC)	26.11	
32	5	Lao Kuan Fong (MAC)	26.29	
33	3	Yacob Al-Khulaifi (QAT)	26.30	
34	3	Kawas Behram Aga (PAK)	26.95	
35	3	Lim Keouodom (CAM)	27.38	
36	1	Erdenemönkhiin Demüül (MGL)	27.55	
37	1	Anas Al-Tamari (PLE)	27.56	
38	2	Alijon Khairulloev (TJK)	28.67	
39	2	Buman-Uchralyn Bat-Od (MGL)	29.96	
40	2	Ali Asghar Nazari (AFG)	30.22	
—	3	Mohammed Bedour (JOR)	DNS	

=== Final ===
Rank	Athlete	Time	Notes
1st place, gold medalist(s)	Joseph Schooling (SGP)	23.61	
2nd place, silver medalist(s)	Wang Peng (CHN)	23.65	
3rd place, bronze medalist(s)	Adilbek Mussin (KAZ)	23.73	
4	Shunichi Nakao (JPN)	23.88	
5	Li Zhuhao (CHN)	23.89	
6	Paul Lê Nguyễn (VIE)	24.35	
7	Yuki Kobori (JPN)	24.40	
8	Virdhawal Khade (IND)	24.48	
