= Archery at the 2018 Asian Games =

- Venue: Gelora Bung Karno Archery Field
- Dates: 21–28 August 2018
- Competitors: 259 from 29 nations

Archery at the 2018 Asian Games was held between 21 and 28 August 2018 at the Gelora Bung Karno Archery Field in Jakarta, Indonesia, and consisted of eight events.

== Schedule ==
R	Ranking round	E	Elimination rounds	F	Finals

Event↓/Date →	21st Tue	22nd Wed	23rd Thu	24th Fri	25th Sat	26th Sun	27th Mon	28th Tue
Men's individual recurve	R		E					F
Men's team recurve	R				E		F	
Men's team compound		R				E		F
Women's individual recurve	R		E					F
Women's team recurve	R				E		F	
Women's team compound		R				E		F
Mixed team recurve	R			E			F	
Mixed team compound		R		E			F	

== Medalists ==
=== Recurve ===
Event	Gold	Silver	Bronze
Men's individual	Kim Woo-jin; South Korea	Lee Woo-seok; South Korea	Riau Ega Agata; Indonesia
Men's team	Chinese Taipei; Luo Wei-min; Tang Chih-chun; Wei Chun-heng	South Korea; Kim Woo-jin; Lee Woo-seok; Oh Jin-hyek	China; Li Jialun; Sun Quan; Xu Tianyu
Women's individual	Zhang Xinyan; China	Diananda Choirunisa; Indonesia	Kang Chae-young; South Korea
Women's team	South Korea; Chang Hye-jin; Kang Chae-young; Lee Eun-gyeong	Chinese Taipei; Lei Chien-ying; Peng Chia-mao; Tan Ya-ting	Japan; Ayano Kato; Kaori Kawanaka; Tomomi Sugimoto
Mixed team	Japan; Takaharu Furukawa; Tomomi Sugimoto	North Korea; Pak Yong-won; Kang Un-ju	China; Xu Tianyu; Zhang Xinyan

=== Compound ===
Event	Gold	Silver	Bronze
Men's team	South Korea; Choi Yong-hee; Hong Sung-ho; Kim Jong-ho	India; Rajat Chauhan; Aman Saini; Abhishek Verma	Malaysia; Alang Arif Aqil; Lee Kin Lip; Juwaidi Mazuki
Women's team	South Korea; Choi Bo-min; So Chae-won; Song Yun-soo	India; Muskan Kirar; Madhumita Kumari; Jyothi Surekha	Chinese Taipei; Chen Li-ju; Chen Yi-hsuan; Lin Ming-ching
Mixed team	Chinese Taipei; Pan Yu-ping; Chen Yi-hsuan	South Korea; Kim Jong-ho; So Chae-won	Iran; Nima Mahboubi; Fereshteh Ghorbani

== Medal table ==
Rank	Nation	Gold	Silver	Bronze	Total
1	South Korea (KOR)	4	3	1	8
2	Chinese Taipei (TPE)	2	1	1	4
3	China (CHN)	1	0	2	3
4	Japan (JPN)	1	0	1	2
5	India (IND)	0	2	0	2
6	Indonesia (INA)	0	1	1	2
7	North Korea (PRK)	0	1	0	1
8	Iran (IRI)	0	0	1	1
8	Malaysia (MAS)	0	0	1	1
Totals (9 entries)		8	8	8	24

== Participating nations ==
A total of 259 athletes from 29 nations competed in archery at the 2018 Asian Games:

- Bangladesh (13)
- Bhutan (8)
- China (8)
- Chinese Taipei (16)
- Hong Kong (8)
- India (16)
- Indonesia (16)
- Iran (13)
- Iraq (2)
- Japan (8)
- Kazakhstan (16)
- Kyrgyzstan (4)
- Laos (6)
- Malaysia (16)
- Mongolia (14)
- Myanmar (6)
- Nepal (5)
- North Korea (7)
- Pakistan (2)
- Philippines (5)
- Qatar (7)
- Saudi Arabia (3)
- Singapore (9)
- South Korea (16)
- Sri Lanka (1)
- Tajikistan (4)
- Thailand (14)
- United Arab Emirates (4)
- Vietnam (12)
