= Canoeing at the 2018 Asian Games – Men's C-1 1000 metres =

Men's C-1 1000 metres at the 2018 Asian Games
- Venue: Jakabaring Lake
- Date: 30 August 2018
- Competitors: 8 from 8 nations

Medalists
gold medal	Vadim Menkov	Uzbekistan
silver medal	Shahriyor Daminov	Tajikistan
bronze medal	Mohammad Nabi Rezaei	Iran

The men's sprint C-1 (canoe single) 1000 metres competition at the 2018 Asian Games was held on 30 August 2018.

== Schedule ==
All times are Western Indonesia Time (UTC+07:00)

Date	Time	Event
Thursday, 30 August 2018	09:10	Final

== Results ==
Legend

- DNF — Did not finish

Rank	Athlete	Time
1st place, gold medalist(s)	Vadim Menkov (UZB)	4:05.224
2nd place, silver medalist(s)	Shahriyor Daminov (TJK)	4:05.950
3rd place, bronze medalist(s)	Mohammad Nabi Rezaei (IRI)	4:06.434
4	Kim Gyu-myeong (KOR)	4:08.312
5	Kaiki Oshiro (JPN)	4:11.232
6	Yutthana Porananon (THA)	4:44.120
7	Horl Lyda (CAM)	5:00.682
—	Zheng Pengfei (CHN)	DNF
