= Kurash at the 2018 Asian Games – Men's 81 kg =

Men's 81 kg at the 2018 Asian Games
- Venue: Jakarta Convention Center
- Dates: 29 August 2018
- Competitors: 30 from 20 nations

Medalists
gold medal	Elias Aliakbari	Iran
silver medal	Behruzi Khojazoda	Tajikistan
bronze medal	Omid Tiztak	Iran
bronze medal	Sarvar Shomurodov	Uzbekistan

The men's Kurash 81 kilograms competition at the 2018 Asian Games in Jakarta, Indonesia was held on 29 August at the JCC Assembly Hall.

Kurash is a traditional martial art from Uzbekistan that resembles wrestling. There are three assessment system in Kurash, namely Halal, Yambosh, and Chala. Halal is if an athlete Kurash is able to slam his opponent in the back. Yambosh is the imperfect of Halal, two Yambosh same as Halal.

== Schedule ==
All times are Western Indonesia Time (UTC+07:00)

Date	Time	Event
Wednesday, 29 August 2018	14:00	Round of 32
Wednesday, 29 August 2018	14:00	Round of 16
Wednesday, 29 August 2018	14:00	Quarterfinals
Wednesday, 29 August 2018	17:00	Semifinals
Wednesday, 29 August 2018	17:00	Final

== Results ==
=== Final ===
Final
Behruzi Khojazoda (TJK)	010
Elias Aliakbari (IRI)	011

=== Top half ===
Round of 32
Huang Chun-ta (TPE)	011
Ali Al-Taweel (KUW)	000
Ayan Yermekbayev (KAZ)	004
Pharuehatphasathonbodee Suwannaphueng (THA)	100
Manish Tokas (IND)	000
Muso Sobirov (UZB)	110
Omid Tiztak (IRI)	111
Daýanç Omirow (TKM)	001
Kohei Soeda (JPN)	012
Hussein Al-Jarrah (YEM)	001
Besmilah Mohammadi (AFG)	100
Mönkhbatyn Dagvadorj (MGL)	000
Komang Ardiarta (INA)	011
Dennis Catipon (PHI)	000

Round of 16
Huang Chun-ta (TPE)	101
Pharuehatphasathonbodee Suwannaphueng (THA)	000
Behruzi Khojazoda (TJK)	010
Muso Sobirov (UZB)	010
Omid Tiztak (IRI)	013
Kohei Soeda (JPN)	000
Besmilah Mohammadi (AFG)	100
Komang Ardiarta (INA)	000

Quarterfinals
Huang Chun-ta (TPE)	000
Behruzi Khojazoda (TJK)	101
Omid Tiztak (IRI)	012
Besmilah Mohammadi (AFG)	002

Semifinals
Behruzi Khojazoda (TJK)	100
Omid Tiztak (IRI)	000

=== Bottom half ===
Round of 32
Mugtaba Ahmed (IRQ)	011
Zhanibek Sultan (KAZ)	112
Zeyad Mater (YEM)	001
Sarvar Shomurodov (UZB)	001
Akmal Murodov (TJK)	102
Bùi Minh Quân (VIE)	001
Mohamad Kasem (SYR)	110
Dilawar Khan Sannan (PAK)	000
Shatman Esenbek Uulu (KGZ)	010
Mohammad Arif Malikyar (AFG)	000
Kunal (IND)	000
Bayanmönkhiin Gaajadamba (MGL)	111
Elias Aliakbari (IRI)	102
Nedir Allaberdiýew (TKM)	000

Round of 16
Zhanibek Sultan (KAZ)	000
Sarvar Shomurodov (UZB)	003
Akmal Murodov (TJK)	012
Mohamad Kasem (SYR)	001
Shatman Esenbek Uulu (KGZ)	001
Bayanmönkhiin Gaajadamba (MGL)	001
Elias Aliakbari (IRI)	111
Bayu Febrian Rahman (INA)	000

Quarterfinals
Sarvar Shomurodov (UZB)	102
Akmal Murodov (TJK)	000
Bayanmönkhiin Gaajadamba (MGL)	001
Elias Aliakbari (IRI)	001

Semifinals
Sarvar Shomurodov (UZB)	001
Elias Aliakbari (IRI)	003
