= Archery at the 2018 Asian Games – Women's team recurve =

Women's team recurve at the 2018 Asian Games
- Venue: Gelora Bung Karno Archery Field
- Dates: 21–27 August 2018
- Competitors: 55 from 15 nations

Medalists
gold medal	South Korea; Chang Hye-jin, Kang Chae-young, Lee Eun-gyeong
silver medal	Chinese Taipei; Lei Chien-ying, Peng Chia-mao, Tan Ya-ting
bronze medal	Japan; Ayano Kato, Kaori Kawanaka, Tomomi Sugimoto

The women's team recurve archery competition at the 2018 Asian Games was held from 21 to 27 August at Gelora Bung Karno Archery Field.

A total of 14 teams participated in the ranking round to determine the seeds for knockout round. Each team consisted of the highest ranked three athletes from the qualification round.

== Schedule ==
All times are Western Indonesia Time (UTC+07:00)

Date	Time	Event
Tuesday, 21 August 2018	09:00	Ranking round
Saturday, 25 August 2018	09:30	1/8 eliminations
Saturday, 25 August 2018	12:25	Quarterfinals
Saturday, 25 August 2018	14:05	Semifinals
Monday, 27 August 2018	09:30	Bronze medal match
Monday, 27 August 2018	09:55	Gold medal match

== Results ==
Legend

- DNS — Did not start

=== Ranking round ===
Rank	Team	Half		Total	10s	Xs
Rank	Team	1st	2nd	Total	10s	Xs
1	South Korea (KOR)	1022	1016	2038	112	35
	Chang Hye-jin	335	342	677	32	11
	Jung Dasomi	~~333~~	~~341~~	~~674~~	~~34~~	~~14~~
	Kang Chae-young	343	338	681	40	7
	Lee Eun-gyeong	344	336	680	40	17
2	Chinese Taipei (TPE)	1004	1006	2010	97	29
	Lei Chien-ying	339	335	674	36	13
	Lo Hsiao-yuan	~~274~~	~~236~~	~~510~~	~~8~~	~~5~~
	Peng Chia-mao	330	334	664	29	10
	Tan Ya-ting	335	337	672	32	6
3	China (CHN)	975	985	1960	76	21
	Cao Hui	326	329	655	27	9
	Zhai Yuejun	317	322	639	21	4
	Zhang Dan	~~302~~	~~324~~	~~626~~	~~6~~	~~11~~
	Zhang Xinyan	332	334	666	28	8
4	Japan (JPN)	976	979	1955	77	20
	Ayano Kato	325	318	643	21	3
	Kaori Kawanaka	326	323	649	28	10
	Tomomi Sugimoto	325	338	663	28	7
5	Indonesia (INA)	987	962	1949	68	20
	Diananda Choirunisa	329	333	662	25	9
	Aqidatul Izzah	~~310~~	~~305~~	~~615~~	~~14~~	~~3~~
	Linda Lestari	333	318	651	23	4
	Titik Kusuma Wardani	325	311	636	20	7
6	Kazakhstan (KAZ)	966	968	1934	65	19
	Karakoz Askarova	~~293~~	~~288~~	~~581~~	~~7~~	~~2~~
	Alina Ilyassova	325	315	640	22	3
	Luiza Saidiyeva	316	325	641	21	8
	Farida Tukebayeva	325	328	653	22	8
7	India (IND)	971	937	1908	55	16
	Ankita Bhakat	320	297	617	14	3
	Promila Daimary	321	321	642	19	3
	Deepika Kumari	330	319	649	22	10
	Laxmirani Majhi	~~307~~	~~301~~	~~608~~	~~16~~	~~4~~
8	North Korea (PRK)	952	953	1905	52	12
	Kang Jin-hwa	~~319~~	~~297~~	~~616~~	~~14~~	~~3~~
	Kang Un-ju	325	325	650	22	4
	Pak Hyang-sun	306	315	621	13	4
	Ri Ji-hyang	321	313	634	17	4
9	Vietnam (VIE)	947	955	1902	51	9
	Lê Thị Thu Hiền	296	303	599	10	1
	Lộc Thị Đào	330	328	658	30	6
	Nguyễn Thị Phương	321	324	645	11	2
10	Mongolia (MGL)	955	927	1882	58	24
	Nyamjargalyn Ariunbileg	~~301~~	~~312~~	~~613~~	~~13~~	~~4~~
	Altangereliin Enkhtuyaa	314	307	621	19	8
	Danzandorjiin Miroslava	310	309	619	18	7
	Bishindeegiin Urantungalag	331	311	642	21	9
11	Malaysia (MAS)	919	952	1871	52	14
	Nur Afisa Abdul Halil	~~302~~	~~311~~	~~613~~	~~13~~	~~2~~
	Nur Aliya Ghapar	315	316	631	18	3
	Loke Shin Hui	297	319	616	18	6
	Nuramalia Haneesha Mazlan	307	317	624	16	5
12	Hong Kong (HKG)	900	897	1797	34	12
	Ada Lam	310	291	601	12	4
	Tsui Chung Yan	~~258~~	~~260~~	~~518~~	~~7~~	~~0~~
	Wang Cheuk Ying	291	304	595	10	4
	Wu Sze Yan	299	302	601	12	4
13	Bangladesh (BAN)	885	901	1786	28	11
	Nasrin Akter	304	306	610	14	3
	Ety Khatun	293	300	593	6	4
	Beauty Ray	288	295	583	8	4
14	Kyrgyzstan (KGZ)	829	855	1684	23	8
	Diana Kanatbek Kyzy	226	254	480	3	1
	Aiturgan Mamatkulova	292	292	584	5	2
	Asel Sharbekova	311	309	620	15	5
—	Tajikistan (TJK)			DNS		
	Mavzuna Azimova			DNS		
	Zukhro Tagaeva	288	279	567	8	4
	Firuza Zubaydova	305	292	597	14	4

=== Knockout round ===
1/8 eliminations
9	Vietnam	52	51	54	54	3
8	North Korea	54	49	58	54	5
5	Indonesia	50	56	53	54	6
12	Hong Kong	55	52	50	50	2
13	Bangladesh	47	50	53	50	2
4	Japan	53	53	52	53	6
3	China	52	52	50	6
14	Kyrgyzstan	50	47	43	0
11	Malaysia	54	48	51	44	2
6	Kazakhstan	48	55	53	50	6
7	India	55	52	55	54	5
10	Mongolia	50	51	56	54	3

Quarterfinals
1	South Korea	56	55	56	6
8	North Korea	46	52	49	0
5	Indonesia	49	51	50	0
4	Japan	52	53	52	6
3	China	55	57	52	54	6
6	Kazakhstan	57	53	50	45	2
7	India	55	51	55	47	2
2	Chinese Taipei	56	56	52	57	6

Semifinals
1	South Korea	54	54	58	55	6
4	Japan	57	52	52	52	2
3	China	55	56	54	55	3
2	Chinese Taipei	57	54	54	57	5

Gold medal match
1	South Korea	55	53	58	54	5
2	Chinese Taipei	53	55	58	53	3
Bronze medal match
4	Japan	54	55	52	51	6
3	China	57	52	50	50	2
