= Bhutan at the 2018 Asian Games =

- IOC code: BHU
- NOC: Bhutan Olympic Committee
- Website: www.bhutanolympiccommittee.org

in Jakarta and Palembang August 18 – September 2
- Competitors: 24 in 4 sports
- Flag bearer: Karma
- Medals: Gold 0 Silver 0 Bronze 0 Total 0

Asian Games appearances (overview)
- 1986; 1990; 1994; 1998; 2002; 2006; 2010; 2014; 2018; 2022; 2026

Bhutan participated in the 2018 Asian Games in Jakarta and Palembang, Indonesia from 18 August to 2 September 2018. Bhutan first competed at the Asian Games in 1986 Seoul. At the previous edition of 2014 Asian Games in Incheon, South Korea, a total of 16 Bhutanese athletes took part in seven different sports. This time, 24 Bhutanese athletes competed in four different sports including archery, boxing, taekwondo and golf.

Archer Karma was the nation's flag bearer at the opening ceremony.

== Competitors ==
The following is a list of the number of competitors representing Bhutan that participated at the Games:

Sport	Men	Women	Total
Archery	6	2	8
Boxing	6	1	7
Golf	1	0	1
Taekwondo	5	3	8
Total	18	6	24

== Archery ==
Recurve

Athlete	Event	Ranking round		Round of 64	Round of 32	Round of 16	Quarterfinals	Semifinals	Final / BM	
Athlete	Event	Score	Seed	Opposition Score	Opposition Score	Opposition Score	Opposition Score	Opposition Score	Opposition Score	Rank
Kinley Tshering	Men's individual	615	38	Edwar (INA); L 2–6	did not advance					
Lam Dorji	Men's individual	602	69	did not advance						
Nima Wangdi	Men's individual	609	41	Magar (NEP); L 0–6	did not advance					
Kinley Tshering; Lam Dorji; Nima Wangdi	Men's team	1826	18	—N/a	North Korea; L 0–6	did not advance				
Karma	Women's individual	587	35	Zubaydova (TJK); L 3–7	did not advance					
Sonam Dema	Women's individual	560	39	Phutdee (THA); W 6–4	Choirunisa (INA); L 4–6	did not advance				
Kinley Tshering; Karma	Mixed team	1202	19	—N/a	Myanmar; L 1–5	did not advance				

Compound

Athlete	Event	Ranking round		Round of 32	Round of 16	Quarterfinals	Semifinals	Final / BM	
Athlete	Event	Score	Seed	Opposition Score	Opposition Score	Opposition Score	Opposition Score	Opposition Score	Rank
Phuntsho Wangdi; Tandin Dorji; Tansi Peljor	Men's team	2028	13	—N/a	Iran; L 217–231	did not advance			

== Boxing ==
Men

Athlete	Event	Round of 32	Round of 16	Quarterfinals	Semifinals	Final	Rank
Athlete	Event	Opposition Result	Opposition Result	Opposition Result	Opposition Result	Opposition Result	Rank
Tashi Wangdi	–49 kg	T Tsuboi (JPN); L 0–5	did not advance				
Tenzin Drugyel	–52 kg	Bye	O T-b (PRK); L 0–5	did not advance			
Nima Dorji	–56 kg	Bye	Naqeebullah (PAK); L 2–3	did not advance			
Tshering Samdrup	–60 kg	MK Nooristani (AFG); WO	AK Uulu (KGZ); L RSC	did not advance			
Dorji Wangdi	–64 kg	L Gha (INA); L 0–5	did not advance				
Sangay Wangdi	–69 kg	M Kumar (IND); L 0–5	did not advance				

Women

Athlete	Event	Round of 32	Round of 16	Quarterfinals	Semifinals	Final	Rank
Athlete	Event	Opposition Result	Opposition Result	Opposition Result	Opposition Result	Opposition Result	Rank
Tandin Lhamo	–51 kg	Bye	Chang Y (CHN); L RSC	did not advance			

== Golf ==
Men

Athlete	Event	Round 1	Round 2	Round 3	Round 4	Total		
Athlete	Event	Score	Score	Score	Score	Score	Par	Rank
Ugen Dorji	Individual	76	82	84	79	321	+33	68

== Taekwondo ==
Bhutan entered eight taekwondo practioniers (five men and three women). All competed in the kyorugi events.

Kyorugi
Men

Athlete	Event	Round of 32	Round of 16	Quarterfinal	Semifinal	Final	
Athlete	Event	Opposition score	Opposition score	Opposition score	Opposition score	Opposition score	Rank
Tenzin Dorji	Men's −58 kg	Sagar Guvaju (NEP); L 40–54	did not advance				
Yeshi Dorji	Men's −63 kg	Molomyn Tümenbayar (MGL); L 2–23	did not advance				
Jigme Wangchuk	Men's −68 kg	Gyanendra Hamal (NEP)	did not advance				
Sonam Wangchuk	Men's −80 kg	Lee Hwa-jun (KOR); L 2–36	did not advance				
Tenzin Lhendup	Men's +80 kg	—N/a	Nattapat Tantramart (THA); L 1–12	did not advance			

Women

Athlete	Event	Round of 32	Round of 16	Quarterfinal	Semifinal	Final	
Athlete	Event	Opposition score	Opposition score	Opposition score	Opposition score	Opposition score	Rank
Kinzang Choden	Women's −57 kg	Bye	Gyani Chunara (NEP); L 6–28	did not advance			
Sonam Yangtsho	Women's −67 kg	—N/a	Sonesavanh Sirimanotham (LAO); W 23–11	Zhang Mengyu (CHN); L 0–35	did not advance		
Lham Tshering	Women's +67 kg	—N/a	Mokhru Khalimova (TJK); W DQ	Lee Da-bin (KOR); L 0–24	did not advance		

== See also ==
- Bhutan at the 2018 Asian Para Games
