= Wushu at the 2018 Asian Games – Men's sanda 70 kg =

Men's sanda 70 kg at the 2018 Asian Games
- Venue: Jakarta International Expo
- Dates: 19–23 August 2018
- Competitors: 14 from 14 nations

Medalists
gold medal	Mohsen Mohammadseifi	Iran
silver medal	Shi Zhanwei	China
bronze medal	Puja Riyaya	Indonesia
bronze medal	Ham Gwan-sik	South Korea

The men's sanda 70 kilograms competition at the 2018 Asian Games in Jakarta, Indonesia was held from 19 August to 23 August at the JIExpo Kemayoran Hall B3.

A total of fifteen competitors from fifteen countries (NOCs) competed in this event, limited to fighters whose body weight was less than 70 kilograms.

Mohsen Mohammadseifi from Iran won the gold medal after beating his opponent Shi Zhanwei of China in gold medal bout 2–0, Mohammadseifi won both rounds by the same score of 5–0 to win his third Asian Games title. Mohammadseifi won the gold medal without losing a single round in the entire competition.

The bronze medal was shared by both semifinal losers, Puja Riyaya from the host nation Indonesia and Ham Gwan-sik from South Korea.

== Schedule ==
All times are Western Indonesia Time (UTC+07:00)

Date	Time	Event
Sunday, 19 August 2018	19:00	Round of 16
Tuesday, 21 August 2018	19:00	Quarterfinals
Wednesday, 22 August 2018	19:00	Semifinals
Thursday, 23 August 2018	10:00	Final

== Results ==
Legend

- TV — Technical victory

Round of 16
Maaz Khan (PAK)	TV
Elie Bou Gebrael (LBN)
Mirzodalerkhon Khurshedzoda (TJK)	0
Pardeep Kumar (IND)	2
Nasratullah Habibi (AFG)	0
Puja Riyaya (INA)	2
Azizbek Isroilov (UZB)	0
Zhoomart Keldeibai Uulu (KGZ)	2
Chitra Sing Thakuri (NEP)	0
Ham Gwan-sik (KOR)	2
Amir Ismailov (KAZ)	0
Mohsen Mohammadseifi (IRI)	2

Quarterfinals
Shi Zhanwei (CHN)	2
Maaz Khan (PAK)	0
Pardeep Kumar (IND)	1
Puja Riyaya (INA)	2
Zhoomart Keldeibai Uulu (KGZ)	0
Ham Gwan-sik (KOR)	2
Mohsen Mohammadseifi (IRI)	TV
Kalanh Khotsombath (LAO)

Semifinals
Shi Zhanwei (CHN)	2
Puja Riyaya (INA)	0
Ham Gwan-sik (KOR)	0
Mohsen Mohammadseifi (IRI)	2

Final
Shi Zhanwei (CHN)	0
Mohsen Mohammadseifi (IRI)	2
