= Judo at the 2018 Asian Games – Men's +100 kg =

Judo competition

Men's +100 kg at the 2018 Asian Games
- Venue: Jakarta Convention Center
- Date: 31 August 2018
- Competitors: 11 from 11 nations

Medalists
| gold medal | Kim Sung-min | South Korea |
| silver medal | Ölziibayaryn Düürenbayar | Mongolia |
| bronze medal | Bekmurod Oltiboev | Uzbekistan |
| bronze medal | Shakarmamad Mirmamadov | Tajikistan |

The men's +100 kilograms (Heavyweight) competition at the 2018 Asian Games in Jakarta was held on 31 August at the Jakarta Convention Center Assembly Hall.

Kim Sung-min of South Korea won the gold medal.

== Schedule ==
All times are Western Indonesia Time (UTC+07:00)

| Date | Time | Event |
|---|---|---|
| Friday, 31 August 2018 | 09:00 | Elimination round of 16 |
| Friday, 31 August 2018 | 09:00 | Quarterfinals |
| Friday, 31 August 2018 | 09:00 | Repechage |
| Friday, 31 August 2018 | 09:00 | Semifinals |
| Friday, 31 August 2018 | 16:00 | Finals |

== Results ==
=== Main bracket ===
Elimination round of 16
Yin Yongjie (CHN) | 10
Toga Pramandita (INA) | 00
Sanzhar Zhabborov (KAZ) | 00
Shakarmamad Mirmamadov (TJK) | 10
Bekbolot Toktogonov (KGZ) | 10
Chen Sheng-min (TPE) | 00

Quarterfinals
Kim Sung-min (KOR) | 10
Yin Yongjie (CHN) | 00
Takeshi Ojitani (JPN) | 11
Bekmurod Oltiboev (UZB) | 00
Ölziibayaryn Düürenbayar (MGL) | 01
Shakarmamad Mirmamadov (TJK) | 00
Javad Mahjoub (IRI) | 01
Bekbolot Toktogonov (KGZ) | 00

Semifinals
Kim Sung-min (KOR) | 10
Takeshi Ojitani (JPN) | 00
Ölziibayaryn Düürenbayar (MGL) | 10
Javad Mahjoub (IRI) | 00

Gold medal contest
Kim Sung-min (KOR) | 01
Ölziibayaryn Düürenbayar (MGL) | 00

=== Repechage ===
Repechage
Yin Yongjie (CHN) | 00
Bekmurod Oltiboev (UZB) | 11
Shakarmamad Mirmamadov (TJK) | 10
Bekbolot Toktogonov (KGZ) | 00

Bronze medal contests
Bekmurod Oltiboev (UZB) | 01
Javad Mahjoub (IRI) | 00
Shakarmamad Mirmamadov (TJK) | 10
Takeshi Ojitani (JPN) | 00
