= Tajikistan at the 2018 Asian Games =

- IOC code: TJK
- NOC: National Olympic Committee of the Republic of Tajikistan
- Website: www.olympic.tj

in Jakarta and Palembang August 18 – September 2
- Competitors: 87 in 16 sports
- Flag bearer: Rustam Iskandari
- Medals Ranked 30th: Gold 0 Silver 4 Bronze 3 Total 7

Asian Games appearances (overview)
- 1994; 1998; 2002; 2006; 2010; 2014; 2018; 2022; 2026

Tajikistan participated in the 2018 Asian Games in Jakarta and Palembang, Indonesia from 18 August to 2 September 2018. This event marks as the seventh appearance for Tajikistan since 1994 Hiroshima Games. The best achievement by medals was in 2006 Doha by collecting 2 gold and 2 bronze medals. At the last edition in Incheon, Tajikistan captured a gold, a silver, and 3 bronze medals, made the country standing in 23rd position, as their best ranking since the first occasion.

Tajikistan sent more than 80 athletes competing in 16 sporting events at this Games. Wrestler Rustam Iskandari assigned as a flag bearer at the opening ceremony parade.

== Medalists ==
The following Tajikistan competitors won medals at the Games.

Medal	Name	Sport	Event	Date
Silver	Dilshod Nazarov	Athletics	Men's hammer throw	26 Aug
Silver	Behruzi Khojazoda	Kurash	Men's 81 kg	29 Aug
Silver	Shahriyor Daminov	Canoeing	Men's C-1 1000 metres	30 Aug
Silver	Umed Khasanbekov	Sambo	Men's 90 kg	1 Sep
Bronze	Komronshokh Ustopiriyon	Judo	Men's 90 kg	31 Aug
Bronze	Shakarmamad Mirmamadov	Judo	Men's +100 kg	31 Aug
Bronze	Komronshokh Ustopiriyon	Sambo	Men's 90 kg	1 Sep

Medals by sport
Sport	1st place, gold medalist(s)	2nd place, silver medalist(s)	3rd place, bronze medalist(s)	Total
Athletics	0	1	0	1
Canoeing	0	1	0	1
Judo	0	0	2	2
Kurash	0	1	0	1
Sambo	0	1	1	2
Total	0	4	3	7

Medals by day
Day	Date	1st place, gold medalist(s)	2nd place, silver medalist(s)	3rd place, bronze medalist(s)	Total
1	August 19	0	0	0	0
2	August 20	0	0	0	0
3	August 21	0	0	0	0
4	August 22	0	0	0	0
5	August 23	0	0	0	0
6	August 24	0	0	0	0
7	August 25	0	0	0	0
8	August 26	0	1	0	1
9	August 27	0	0	0	0
10	August 28	0	0	0	0
11	August 29	0	1	0	1
12	August 30	0	1	0	1
13	August 31	0	0	2	2
14	September 1	0	1	1	2
15	September 2	0	0	0	0
Total		0	4	3	7

== Competitors ==
The following is a list of the number of competitors representing Tajikistan that participated at the Games:

Sport	Men	Women	Total
Archery	1	3	4
Athletics	5	1	6
Boxing	2	2	4
Canoeing	6	0	6
Football	0	18	18
Ju-jitsu	3	0	3
Judo	7	1	8
Karate	2	1	3
Kurash	7	0	7
Sambo	4	0	4
Shooting	2	2	4
Swimming	3	2	5
Taekwondo	3	1	4
Weightlifting	1	0	1
Wrestling	9	0	9
Wushu	1	0	1
Total	56	31	87

== Archery ==
Recurve

Athlete	Event	Ranking round		Round of 64	Round of 32	Round of 16	Quarterfinals	Semifinals	Final / BM	
Athlete	Event	Score	Seed	Opposition Score	Opposition Score	Opposition Score	Opposition Score	Opposition Score	Opposition Score	Rank
Umedzhon Khudoyarov	Men's individual	440	47	Muto (JPN); L 0–6	Did not advance					
Firuza Zubaydova	Women's individual	597	30	Karma (BHU); W 7–3	Le (TPE); L 0–6	Did not advance				
Mavzuna Azimova	Women's individual	DNS		Did not advance						
Zukhro Tagaeva	Women's individual	567	38	Akter (BAN); W 6–2	Sugimoto (JPN); L 0–6	Did not advance				
Umedzhon Khudoyarov; Firuza Zubaydova	Mixed team	1037	22	—N/a	Malaysia; L 0–6	Did not advance				

== Athletics ==
Tajikistan entered six athletes (5 men's and 1 women) to participate in the athletics competition at the Games.

== Boxing ==
Men

Athlete	Event	Round of 32	Round of 16	Quarterfinals	Semifinals	Final	Rank
Athlete	Event	Opposition Result	Opposition Result	Opposition Result	Opposition Result	Opposition Result	Rank
Asror Vokhidov	–56 kg	Bye	J Al-Sudani (IRQ); L 2–3	Did not advance			
Bakhodur Usmonov	–64 kg	D Saparamadu (SRI); W RSC	W Masuk (THA); L 1–4	Did not advance			

Women

Athlete	Event	Round of 32	Round of 16	Quarterfinals	Semifinals	Final	Rank
Athlete	Event	Opposition Result	Opposition Result	Opposition Result	Opposition Result	Opposition Result	Rank
Madina Ghaforova	–51 kg	Bye	S Devi (IND); L 0–5	Did not advance			
Shoira Zulkaynarova	–60 kg	—N/a	K Dharmathilake (SRI); W 5–0	Choe H-s (PRK); L 0–5	Did not advance		

== Canoeing ==
Tajikistan participated in the canoeing with six men's athlete who competing in six different events.

=== Sprint ===
Athlete	Event	Heats		Semifinal		Final	
Athlete	Event	Time	Rank	Time	Rank	Time	Rank
Shahriyor Daminov	Men's C-1 1000 m	—N/a				4:05.950	2nd place, silver medalist(s)
Shahriyor Daminov; Mustafo Daminov	Men's C-2 200 m	45.112	5 QS	46.525	4	Did not advance	
Shahriyor Daminov; Mustafo Daminov	Men's C-2 1000 m	—N/a				4:41.997	9
Abdusattor Gafurov	Men's K-1 200 m	42.301	5 QS	39.563	6	Did not advance	
Abdusattor Gafurov; Zohirjon Nabiev	Men's K-2 1000 m	3:52.381	5 QS	3:47.529	5	Did not advance	
Abdusattor Gafurov; Zohirjon Nabiev; Saidilhomkhon Nazirov; Tokhir Nurmukhammadi	Men's K-4 500 m	1:37.380	4 QS	1:34.501	3 QF	1:37.539	8

Qualification legend: QF=Final; QS=Semifinal

== Football ==
Tajikistan Football Federation entered their women's team to participate at the Games, and were drawn in the Group B at the Games.

Summary

Team	Event	Group stage				Quarterfinal	Semifinal	Final / BM	
Team	Event	Opposition Score	Opposition Score	Opposition Score	Rank	Opposition Score	Opposition Score	Opposition Score	Rank
Tajikistan women's	Women's tournament	North Korea; L 0–16	China; L 0–16	Hong Kong; L 1–6	4	Did not advance			11

=== Women's tournament ===
Roster

The following is the Tajikistan squad in the women's football tournament of the 2018 Asian Games. The team of 18 players was officially named on 13 August.

Head coach: Kanoat Latipov

No.	Pos.	Player	Date of birth (age)	Club
1	GK	Saiyora Saidova	1 February 1998 (aged 20)	(Tajikistan Football Federation) Zeboniso Dushanbe
16	GK	Adolatkhon Komilova	19 November 1997 (aged 20)	(Tajikistan Football Federation) Khatlon Bokhtar
23	GK	Azimzoda Shukronai	29 December 2002 (aged 15)	(Tajikistan Football Federation) Barh Nurak
2	DF	Sakhina Saidova	16 December 1999 (aged 18)	(Tajikistan Football Federation) Khatlon Bokhtar
5	DF	Nasiba Olimova	14 January 1999 (aged 19)	(Tajikistan Football Federation) Barh Nurak
9	DF	Marjona Fayzulloeva	4 September 2000 (aged 17)	(Tajikistan Football Federation) Zeboniso Dushanbe
12	DF	Shakhnoza Boboeva	6 January 2000 (aged 18)	(Tajikistan Football Federation) Khatlon Bokhtar
14	DF	Nodira Mirzoeva	4 October 1994 (aged 23)	(Tajikistan Football Federation) Regar-TadAZ Tursunzoda
18	DF	Shukrona Khojaeva	11 September 2002 (aged 15)	(Tajikistan Football Federation) Zeboniso Dushanbe
21	DF	Jumakhon Shukronai	4 April 1999 (aged 19)	(Tajikistan Football Federation) Swallow Dushanbe
4	MF	Natalia Sotnikova	2 July 1994 (aged 24)	(Tajikistan Football Federation) Swallow Dushanbe
13	MF	Mavjuda Safarova	7 May 1999 (aged 19)	(Tajikistan Football Federation) Khatlon Bokhtar
17	MF	Munisa Mirzoeva	15 December 2000 (aged 17)	(Tajikistan Football Federation) Regar-TadAZ Tursunzoda
19	MF	Sayramjon Kholnazarova	27 August 1999 (aged 18)	(Tajikistan Football Federation) Khatlon Bokhtar
20	MF	Laylo Khalimova	16 November 1997 (aged 20)	(Tajikistan Football Federation) Khatlon Bokhtar
6	FW	Zulaikho Safarova	21 July 2000 (aged 18)	(Tajikistan Football Federation) Regar-TadAZ Tursunzoda
8	FW	Madina Fozilova	1 May 1996 (aged 22)	(Tajikistan Football Federation) Zeboniso Dushanbe
15	FW	Nekubakht Khudododova	23 February 2002 (aged 16)	(Tajikistan Football Federation) Zeboniso Dushanbe

Group B

Pos	Team	Pld	W	D	L	GF	GA	GD	Pts	Qualification
1	China	3	3	0	0	25	0	+25	9	Advance to Knockout stage
2	North Korea	3	2	0	1	24	2	+22	6	Advance to Knockout stage
3	Hong Kong	3	1	0	2	6	16	−10	3	Advance to Knockout stage
4	Tajikistan	3	0	0	3	1	38	−37	0	

Source: Asian Games 2018
Rules for classification: Group stage tiebreakers
17 August 2018
18:30 UTC+7

North Korea	16–0	Tajikistan
Sung Hyang-sim 2', 6', 24', 42'; Kim Yun-mi 10', 19', 50'; Rim Se-ok 31', 55', 66'; Yu Jong-im 43'; Kim Phyong-hwa 46'; Kim Nam-hui 62'; Kim Un-hwa 77', 82'; Ri Hae-yon 79'	Report

Bumi Sriwijaya Stadium, Palembang
Referee: Pansa Chaisanit (Thailand)

20 August 2018
18:30 UTC+7

Tajikistan	0–16	China
	Report	Zhao Rong 3', 19', 47', 59', 90'; Li Tingting 4'; Wang Shuang 51'; Wang Shanshan 64', 73', 81', 83', 87', 88', 90+1', 90+2', 90+3'

Gelora Sriwijaya Stadium, Palembang
Referee: Bui Thi Thu Trang (Vietnam)

22 August 2018
18:30 UTC+7

Hong Kong	6–1	Tajikistan
Chan Wing Sze 2'; Yuen 10'; Ho Mui Mei 25', 32'; Cham Ching Man 39'; Chun Ching Hang 68'	Report	Sotnikova 36'

Bumi Sriwijaya Stadium, Palembang
Referee: Lee Yi-chi (Chinese Taipei)

== Ju-jitsu ==
Key:

- ADV – Won by advantages.
- RDC – Won by referee decision.
- SUB – Won by submission.

Men

Athlete	Event	Round of 64	Round of 32	Round of 16	Quarterfinals	Semifinals	Repechage	Final / BM	Rank
Athlete	Event	Opposition Result	Opposition Result	Opposition Result	Opposition Result	Opposition Result	Opposition Result	Opposition Result	Rank
Shoymard Abdulnazarov	–62 kg	—N/a	Y Taňryberdiýew (TKM); W 2–0	O Al-Fadhli (UAE); L 0–2	Did not advance				
Abdumanon Rahimov	–77 kg	Bye	S Al-Hammadi (UAE); L 0–2	Did not advance					
Abdughafur Abdulloev	–85 kg	—N/a	Z Mater (YEM); W 100^{SUB}–0	Ng WK (SGP); W 100^{SUB}–0	K Balhol (UAE); L 0–11	Did not advance	A Gavriluk (KAZ); L 0–17	Did not advance	

== Judo ==
Tajikistan participated in Judo at the games with 8 athletes.

Key:

- 1st number — Ippon
- 2nd number — Waza-ari
- s — Shido

Men

Athlete	Event	Round of 32	Round of 16	Quarterfinals	Semifinals	Repechage	Final / BM	Rank
Athlete	Event	Opposition Result	Opposition Result	Opposition Result	Opposition Result	Opposition Result	Opposition Result	Rank
Sukhrob Boqiev	–60 kg	Bye	Shang Y (CHN); L 00–01	Did not advance				
Yokubdzhon Bokiev	–66 kg	MS Raharjo (INA); W 10–01s3	S Akhadov (UZB); L 00s3–10s2	Did not advance				
Behruzi Khojazoda	–73 kg	L Manivanh (LAO); W 10–00s2	K Rebahi (QAT); W 10s1–01s1	An C-r (KOR); L 00s1–01	Did not advance	B Rysmambetov (KGZ); L 00s2–10	Did not advance	
Akmal Murodov	–81 kg	WA Rmilah (PLE); W 10–00s3	O Uuganbaatar (MGL); L 00s1–10s1	Did not advance				
Komronshokh Ustopiriyon	–90 kg	Bye	SR Makaju (NEP); W 11–00s2	N Elias (LBN); W 10s2–00s3	G Altanbagana (MGL); L 01s1–11s1	Bye	I Bozbayev (KAZ); W 01s2–00s2	3rd place, bronze medalist(s)
Saidzhalol Saidov	–100 kg	Bye	J Fadel (LBN); W 10–00	Cho G-h (KOR); L 00s2–01	Did not advance	V Demyanenko (KAZ); W 10s1–00	L Otgonbaatar (MGL); L 00s2–10s1	–
Shakarmamad Mirmamadov	+100 kg	—N/a	S Zhabborov (KAZ); W 10–00s1	Ö Duurenbayar (MGL); L 00–01s1	Did not advance	B Toktogonov (KGZ); W 10–00	T Ojitani (JPN); W 10–00	3rd place, bronze medalist(s)

Women

Athlete	Event	Round of 32	Round of 16	Quarterfinals	Semifinals	Repechage	Final / BM	Rank
Athlete	Event	Opposition Result	Opposition Result	Opposition Result	Opposition Result	Opposition Result	Opposition Result	Rank
Shohida Qalandarova	–57 kg	Bye	Kim J-d (KOR); L 00–10	Did not advance				

== Karate ==
Tajikistan participated in the karate competition at the Games with three athletes (2 men's and 1 women).

== Kurash ==
Tajikistan participated in the kurash competition with seven male athletes.

Men

Athlete	Event	Round of 32	Round of 16	Quarterfinal	Semifinal	Final	
Athlete	Event	Opposition Score	Opposition Score	Opposition Score	Opposition Score	Opposition Score	Rank
Orifdzhon Dodov	–66 kg	M Dashti (KUW); W 012−010	Kao S (TPE); W 101−000	GA Ghanbari (IRI); L 003−010	Did not advance		
Bakhodur Khalimov	–66 kg	Ş Kurbanow (TKM); W 100−011	MG Salem (YEM); W 100−000	Chan H-c (TPE); L 000−100	Did not advance		
Behruzi Khojazoda	–81 kg	Bye	M Sobirov (UZB); W 010−010	Huang C-t (TPE); W 101−000	O Tiztak (IRI); W 100−000	E Aliakbari (IRI); L 010−011	2nd place, silver medalist(s)
Akmal Murodov	–81 kg	Bùi MQ (VIE); W 102−001	M Kasem (SYR); W 012−001	S Shomurodov (UZB); L 000−102	Did not advance		
Davlatshoi Gazalshoi	–90 kg	Bye	H Misri (KUW); L 000−100	Did not advance			
Nabimukhamad Khorkashev	+90 kg	J Pahlevani (IRI); L 000−010	Did not advance				
Saidzhalol Saidov	+90 kg	Bye	Lee P-y (TPE); L 001−010	Did not advance			

== Sambo ==
Tajikistan participated in the sambo competition with four men's athletes.

Key:

- SU – Won by submission.

Athlete	Event	Round of 32	Round of 16	Quarterfinal	Semifinal	Repechage 1	Repechage 2	Repechage final	Final / BM	
Athlete	Event	Opposition Result	Opposition Result	Opposition Result	Opposition Result	Opposition Result	Opposition Result	Opposition Result	Opposition Result	Rank
Khasani Dzhomii	Men's 52 kg	S Jamalabad (IRI); W 1^{SU}–0	I Akhmedjanov (UZB); W 0^{SU}–3	IM Muttaqin (INA); W 1^{SU}–0	B Ibragim (KAZ); L 3–4	Bye			A Rakhmatilloev (UZB); L 0–1	4
Somon Sangov	Men's 52 kg	Bye	B Kanzhanov (KAZ); L 1–2	Did not advance		Bye	A Rakhmatilloev (UZB); L 0–3	Did not advance		
Umed Khasanbekov	Men's 90 kg	Bye	Chuang K-j (TPE); W 8–0	RA Bahari (INA); W 7^{SU}–1	A Aitbek (KAZ); W 1–1	Bye			K Kholmamatov (UZB); L 0–3	2nd place, silver medalist(s)
Komronshokh Ustopiriyon	Men's 90 kg	Bye	A Zekenov (KAZ); W 11–3	N Orazmämmedow (TKM); W 7–1	K Kholmamatov (UZB); L 0–5	Bye			R Esgerow (TKM); W 3^{SU}–0	3rd place, bronze medalist(s)

== Shooting ==
Men

Athlete	Event	Qualification		Final	
Athlete	Event	Points	Rank	Points	Rank
Bezhan Fayzullaev	10 m air pistol	555	34	Did not advance	
Todzhiddin Valiev	10 m air rifle	610.0	34	Did not advance	

Women

Athlete	Event	Qualification		Final	
Athlete	Event	Points	Rank	Points	Rank
Dilorom Lagutenko	10 m air pistol	543	36	Did not advance	
Malika Lagutenko	10 m air rifle	612.2	27	Did not advance	

Mixed team

Athlete	Event	Qualification		Final	
Athlete	Event	Points	Rank	Points	Rank
Bezhan Fayzullaev; Dilorom Lagutenko	10 m air pistol	712	21	Did not advance	
Todzhiddin Valiev; Malika Lagutenko	10 m air rifle	813.0	15	Did not advance	

== Swimming ==
Tajikistan prepared their athletes who will compete at the Games.

Men

Athlete	Event	Heats		Final	
Athlete	Event	Time	Rank	Time	Rank
Olimjon Ishanov	50 m freestyle	25.43	41	Did not advance	
Olimjon Ishanov	100 m freestyle	59.34	44	Did not advance	
Olimjon Ishanov	50 m backstroke	31.87	34	Did not advance	
Alijon Khairulloev	50 m freestyle	27.16	48	Did not advance	
Alijon Khairulloev	100 m freestyle	58.06	41	Did not advance	
Alijon Khairulloev	50 m butterfly	28.67	38	Did not advance	
Ramziyor Khorkashov	50 m backstroke	33.21	37	Did not advance	
Ramziyor Khorkashov	50 m breaststroke	35.21	34	Did not advance	

Women

Athlete	Event	Heats		Final	
Athlete	Event	Time	Rank	Time	Rank
Karina Klimyk	50 m breaststroke	39.26	25	Did not advance	
Karina Klimyk	50 m butterfly	33.94	22	Did not advance	
Anastasiya Tyurina	100 m freestyle	1:19.50	27	Did not advance	
Anastasiya Tyurina	50 m butterfly	32.53	20	Did not advance	

== Taekwondo ==
Tajikistan competed in taekwondo event with four athletes (3 men's and 1 women).

Kyorugi

Athlete	Event	Round of 32	Round of 16	Quarterfinal	Semifinal	Final	
Athlete	Event	Opposition Score	Opposition Score	Opposition Score	Opposition Score	Opposition Score	Rank
Mahmadjon Sunatov	Men's −58 kg	Ny Sovannroth (CAM); W 30–11	F Ashourzadeh (IRI); L 3–26	Did not advance			
Khurram Mehtarshoev	Men's −63 kg	C Mousaco (TLS); W 32–10	Zhao S (CHN); L 4–24	Did not advance			
Farkhod Negmatov	Men's −80 kg	Bye	S Morrison (PHI); L 17–19	Did not advance			
Mokhru Khalimova	Women's +67 kg	—N/a	L Tshering (BHU); DSQ	Did not advance			

== Weightlifting ==
Men

Athlete	Event	Snatch		Clean & jerk		Total	Rank
Athlete	Event	Result	Rank	Result	Rank	Total	Rank
Ilkhomjon Shukurov	−77 kg	108	18	140	15	248	16

== Wrestling ==
Tajikistan put-up 9 men's wrestlers at the Games. Six wrestlers competed in the freestyle event, while 3 wrestlers in the Greco-Roman events.

Key:

- F – Victory by fall.
- PP – Decision by points – the loser with technical points.
- PO – Decision by points – the loser without technical points.
- ST – Great superiority – the loser without technical points and a margin of victory of at least 8 (Greco-Roman) or 10 (freestyle) points.

Men's freestyle

Athlete	Event	Qualification	Round of 16	Quarterfinal	Semifinal	Repechage 1	Repechage 2	Final / BM	
Athlete	Event	Opposition Result	Opposition Result	Opposition Result	Opposition Result	Opposition Result	Opposition Result	Opposition Result	Rank
Hikmatullo Vohidov	−57 kg	E Bekhbayar (MGL); L 0–7	Did not advance			Kim S-g (KOR); L 0–9	Did not advance		18
Abdulqosim Fayziev	−65 kg	Bye	S Jindapan (THA); W 12–2	B Punia (IND); L 2–12	Did not advance	Bye	S Khasanov (UZB); L 0–10	Did not advance	9
Gamid Dzhalilov	−74 kg	Bye	A Rehman (PAK); W 10–0	Gong B-m (KOR); L 6–7	Did not advance				10
Bakhodur Kadirov	−86 kg	Bye	A Davlumbayev (KAZ); L 0–8	Did not advance					12
Rustam Iskandari	−97 kg	—N/a	N A Ahmadi (AFG); WO	Did not advance			—N/a	Did not advance	13
Farkhod Anakulov	−125 kg	—N/a	N Zolboo (MGL); L 0–10	Did not advance			—N/a	Did not advance	11

Men's Greco-Roman

Athlete	Event	Round of 16	Quarterfinal	Semifinal	Repechage	Final / BM	
Athlete	Event	Opposition Result	Opposition Result	Opposition Result	Opposition Result	Opposition Result	Rank
Mubinjon Akhmedov	−67 kg	Zhang GG (CHN); L 6–7	Did not advance				10
Bakhtovar Khasanov	−77 kg	H Al-Azzani (YEM); WO	S Permanow (TKM); L 0–5^{F}	Did not advance			7
Sukhroj Azizov	−130 kg	Bye	M Abdullaev (UZB); L 0–9	Did not advance	Kim M-s (KOR); L 0–8	Did not advance	11

== Wushu ==
Sanda

Athlete	Event	Round of 32	Round of 16	Quarterfinal	Semifinal	Final	
Athlete	Event	Opposition Score	Opposition Score	Opposition Score	Opposition Score	Opposition Score	Rank
Mirzodalerkhon Khurshedzoda	Men's –70 kg	—N/a	P Kumar (IND); L 0–2	Did not advance			
