= Wrestling at the 2018 Asian Games – Men's Greco-Roman 67 kg =

Men's Greco-Roman 67 kg at the 2018 Asian Games
- Venue: Jakarta Convention Center
- Date: 21 August 2018
- Competitors: 16 from 16 nations

Medalists
gold medal	Ryu Han-su	South Korea
silver medal	Almat Kebispayev	Kazakhstan
bronze medal	Amantur Ismailov	Kyrgyzstan
bronze medal	Mohammad Reza Geraei	Iran

The men's Greco-Roman 67 kilograms wrestling competition at the 2018 Asian Games in Jakarta was held on 21 August 2018 at the Jakarta Convention Center Assembly Hall.

== Schedule ==
All times are Western Indonesia Time (UTC+07:00)

Date	Time	Event
Tuesday, 21 August 2018	13:00	1/8 finals
Tuesday, 21 August 2018	13:00	Quarterfinals
Tuesday, 21 August 2018	13:00	Semifinals
Tuesday, 21 August 2018	13:00	Repechages
Tuesday, 21 August 2018	19:00	Finals

== Results ==
Legend

- F — Won by fall
- WO — Won by walkover

=== Main bracket ===
1/8 finals
Ryu Han-su (KOR)	8
Pongsit Deemark (THA)	0
Amantur Ismailov (KGZ)	9
Mohammed Al-Maghrebi (YEM)	0
Zhang Gaoquan (CHN)	7
Mubinjon Akhmedov (TJK)	6
Kim Myong-chol (PRK)	2
Muhammad Aliansyah (INA)	2
Mohammad Reza Geraei (IRI)	11
Abdulkarim Al-Hasan (SYR)	2
Seýdylla Täzäýew (TKM)	0
Elmurat Tasmuradov (UZB)	9
Hung Ying-hua (TPE)	2
Almat Kebispayev (KAZ)	7
Manish (IND)	7
Tsuchika Shimoyamada (JPN)	3

Quarterfinals
Ryu Han-su (KOR)	1
Amantur Ismailov (KGZ)	1
Zhang Gaoquan (CHN)	7
Muhammad Aliansyah (INA)	0
Mohammad Reza Geraei (IRI)	9^{F}
Elmurat Tasmuradov (UZB)	8
Almat Kebispayev (KAZ)	8
Manish (IND)	0

Semifinals
Ryu Han-su (KOR)	2
Zhang Gaoquan (CHN)	0
Mohammad Reza Geraei (IRI)	0
Almat Kebispayev (KAZ)	10

Final
Ryu Han-su (KOR)	5
Almat Kebispayev (KAZ)	4

=== Repechage ===
Repechage round 1
Pongsit Deemark (THA)	0
Amantur Ismailov (KGZ)	10
Hung Ying-hua (TPE)	WO
Manish (IND)

Bronze medals
Amantur Ismailov (KGZ)	6
Zhang Gaoquan (CHN)	1
Hung Ying-hua (TPE)	0
Mohammad Reza Geraei (IRI)	11

== Final standing ==
Rank	Athlete
1st place, gold medalist(s)	Ryu Han-su (KOR)
2nd place, silver medalist(s)	Almat Kebispayev (KAZ)
3rd place, bronze medalist(s)	Amantur Ismailov (KGZ)
3rd place, bronze medalist(s)	Mohammad Reza Geraei (IRI)
5	Zhang Gaoquan (CHN)
5	Hung Ying-hua (TPE)
7	Elmurat Tasmuradov (UZB)
8	Manish (IND)
9	Muhammad Aliansyah (INA)
10	Mubinjon Akhmedov (TJK)
11	Tsuchika Shimoyamada (JPN)
12	Kim Myong-chol (PRK)
13	Abdulkarim Al-Hasan (SYR)
14	Mohammed Al-Maghrebi (YEM)
14	Seýdylla Täzäýew (TKM)
16	Pongsit Deemark (THA)
