= Wrestling at the 2018 Asian Games – Men's freestyle 97 kg =

Men's freestyle 97 kg at the 2018 Asian Games
- Venue: Jakarta Convention Center
- Date: 19 August 2018
- Competitors: 13 from 13 nations

Medalists
gold medal	Alireza Karimi	Iran
silver medal	Magomed Musaev	Kyrgyzstan
bronze medal	Magomed Ibragimov	Uzbekistan
bronze medal	Kim Jae-gang	South Korea

The men's freestyle 97 kilograms wrestling competition at the 2018 Asian Games in Jakarta was held on 19 August 2018 at the Jakarta Convention Center Assembly Hall.

== Schedule ==
All times are Western Indonesia Time (UTC+07:00)

Date	Time	Event
Sunday, 19 August 2018	13:00	1/8 finals
Sunday, 19 August 2018	13:00	Quarterfinals
Sunday, 19 August 2018	13:00	Semifinals
Sunday, 19 August 2018	13:00	Repechages
Sunday, 19 August 2018	20:00	Finals

== Results ==
Legend

- F — Won by fall
- R — Retired
- WO — Won by walkover

=== Main bracket ===
1/8 finals
Yang Chaoqiang (CHN)	0
Magomed Ibragimov (UZB)	10
Magomed Musaev (KGZ)	8
Zyamuhammet Saparow (TKM)	2
Rustam Iskandari (TJK)
Noor Ahmad Ahmadi (AFG)	WO
Ölziisaikhany Batzul (MGL)	5
Bakdaulet Almentay (KAZ)	4
Kim Jae-gang (KOR)	10
Ronald Lumban Toruan (INA)	0

Quarterfinals
Takeshi Yamaguchi (JPN)	0
Alireza Karimi (IRI)	11
Mausam Khatri (IND)	0
Magomed Ibragimov (UZB)	8
Magomed Musaev (KGZ)	6
Noor Ahmad Ahmadi (AFG)	3
Ölziisaikhany Batzul (MGL)	2
Kim Jae-gang (KOR)	3

Semifinals
Alireza Karimi (IRI)	4^{F}
Magomed Ibragimov (UZB)	2
Magomed Musaev (KGZ)	1
Kim Jae-gang (KOR)	1

Final
Alireza Karimi (IRI)	6
Magomed Musaev (KGZ)	0

=== Repechage ===
Repechage round 1
Zyamuhammet Saparow (TKM)	6
Noor Ahmad Ahmadi (AFG)	17

Bronze medals
Takeshi Yamaguchi (JPN)	0^{R}
Magomed Ibragimov (UZB)	6
Noor Ahmad Ahmadi (AFG)	0
Kim Jae-gang (KOR)	3

== Final standing ==
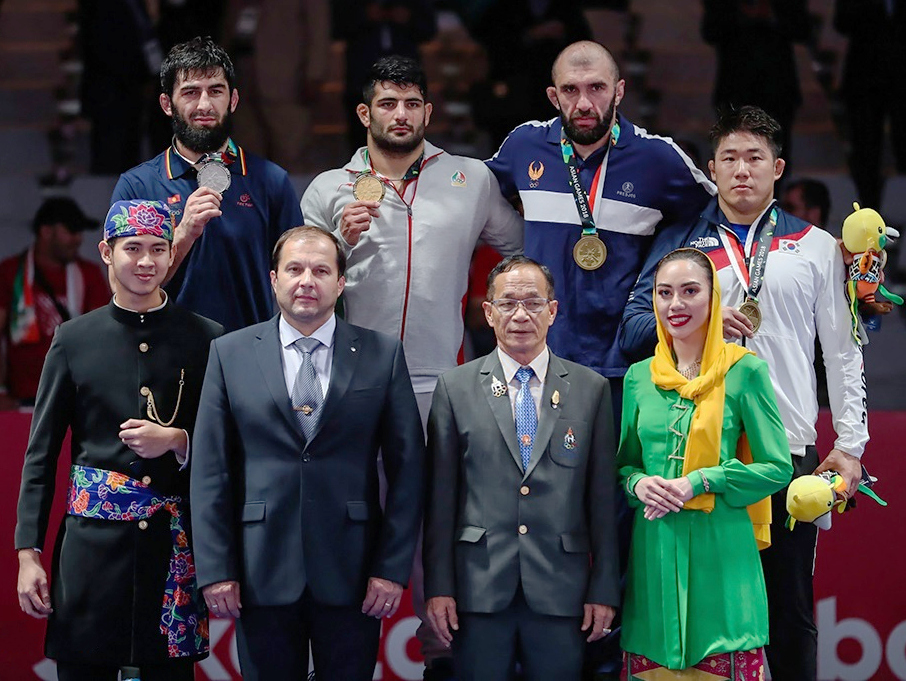
Podium, Left-right: Musaev, Karimi, Ibragimov, Kim

Rank	Athlete
1st place, gold medalist(s)	Alireza Karimi (IRI)
2nd place, silver medalist(s)	Magomed Musaev (KGZ)
3rd place, bronze medalist(s)	Magomed Ibragimov (UZB)
3rd place, bronze medalist(s)	Kim Jae-gang (KOR)
5	Takeshi Yamaguchi (JPN)
5	Noor Ahmad Ahmadi (AFG)
7	Ölziisaikhany Batzul (MGL)
8	Zyamuhammet Saparow (TKM)
9	Bakdaulet Almentay (KAZ)
10	Mausam Khatri (IND)
11	Yang Chaoqiang (CHN)
11	Ronald Lumban Toruan (INA)
—	Rustam Iskandari (TJK)
