= Kyrgyzstan at the 2018 Asian Games =

- IOC code: KGZ
- NOC: National Olympic Committee of the Republic of Kyrgyzstan
- Website: www.olympic.kg

in Jakarta and Palembang August 18 – September 2
- Flag bearer: Kanybek Uulu Onolbek
- Medals Ranked 22nd: Gold 3 Silver 5 Bronze 12 Total 20

Asian Games appearances (overview)
- 1994; 1998; 2002; 2006; 2010; 2014; 2018; 2022; 2026

Kyrgyzstan participated in the 2018 Asian Games in Jakarta and Palembang, Indonesia, from 18 August to 2 September 2018. Kyrgyzstan made its first appearance at the Asian Games in 1994 Hiroshima, and the best achievement was in the 2002 Busan, with a gold, 5 silver and 6 bronze medals. At the last edition in Incheon, Kyrgyzstan managed to claim 2 silver and 4 bronze medals.

== Medalists ==
The following Kyrgyzstan competitors won medals at the Games.

Medal	Name	Sport	Event	Date
Gold	Aisuluu Tynybekova	Wrestling	Women's freestyle 62 kg	20 Aug
Gold	Torokan Bagynbai uulu	Ju-jitsu	Men's 69 kg	24 Aug
Gold	Darya Maslova	Athletics	Women's 10,000 metres	25 Aug
Silver	Magomed Musaev	Wrestling	Men's freestyle 97 kg	19 Aug
Silver	Kanybek Zholchubekov	Wrestling	Men's Greco-Roman 60 kg	21 Aug
Silver	Akzhol Makhmudov	Wrestling	Men's Greco-Roman 77 kg	22 Aug
Silver	Nursultan Alymkulov	Ju-jitsu	Men's 77 kg	26 Aug
Silver	Darya Maslova	Athletics	Women's 5000 metres	28 Aug
Bronze	Meerim Zhumanazarova	Wrestling	Women's freestyle 68 kg	21 Aug
Bronze	Aiperi Medet Kyzy	Wrestling	Women's freestyle 76 kg	21 Aug
Bronze	Amantur Ismailov	Wrestling	Men's Greco-Roman 67 kg	21 Aug
Bronze	Uzur Dzhuzupbekov	Wrestling	Men's Greco-Roman 97 kg	22 Aug
Bronze	Izzat Artykov	Weightlifting	Men's 69 kg	22 Aug
Bronze	Daniiar Tokurov	Pencak silat	Men's tanding 75 kg	26 Aug
Bronze	Zholdoshbek Akimkanov	Pencak silat	Men's tanding 70 kg	26 Aug
Bronze	Abdurahmanhaji Murtazaliev	Ju-jitsu	Men's 85 kg	26 Aug
Bronze	Murtazali Murtazaliev	Ju-jitsu	Men's 85 kg	26 Aug
Bronze	Artur Te	Judo	Men's 66 kg	29 Aug
Bronze	Vladimir Zoloev	Judo	Men's 81 kg	30 Aug
Bronze	Azat Usenaliev	Boxing	Men's 52 kg	1 Sep

Medals by sport
Sport	1st place, gold medalist(s)	2nd place, silver medalist(s)	3rd place, bronze medalist(s)	Total
Athletics	1	1	0	2
Boxing	0	0	1	1
Ju-jitsu	1	1	2	4
Judo	0	0	2	2
Pencak silat	0	0	2	2
Weightlifting	0	0	1	1
Wrestling	0	4	4	8
Total	2	6	12	20

Medals by day
Day	Date	1st place, gold medalist(s)	2nd place, silver medalist(s)	3rd place, bronze medalist(s)	Total
1	August 19	0	1	0	1
2	August 20	0	1	0	1
3	August 21	0	1	3	4
4	August 22	0	1	2	3
5	August 23	0	0	0	0
6	August 24	1	0	0	1
7	August 25	1	0	0	1
8	August 26	0	1	4	0
9	August 27	0	0	0	0
10	August 28	0	1	0	1
11	August 29	0	0	1	1
12	August 30	0	0	1	1
13	August 31	0	0	0	0
14	September 1	0	0	1	1
15	September 2	0	0	0	0
Total		2	6	12	20

== Competitors ==
The following is a list of the number of competitors representing Kyrgyzstan that participated at the Games:

Sport	Men	Women	Total
Archery	1	3	4
Athletics	4	5	9
Basketball	4	0	4
Boxing	6	1	7
Canoeing	2	0	2
Cycling	1	0	1
Equestrian	3	1	4
Fencing	4	1	5
Football	19	0	19
Gymnastics	1	2	3
Ju-jitsu	11	0	11
Judo	6	2	8
Karate	4	2	6
Kurash	4	0	4
Modern pentathlon	2	1	3
Pencak silat	6	3	9
Sambo	3	3	6
Shooting	2	2	4
Swimming	2	1	3
Table tennis	3	0	3
Tennis	2	1	3
Volleyball	12	0	12
Weightlifting	2	1	3
Wrestling	10	3	13
Wushu	4	0	4
Total	118	32	150

Demonstration events

Sport	Men	Women	Total
eSports	1	0	1

== Archery ==
Recurve

Athlete	Event	Ranking round		Round of 64	Round of 32	Round of 16	Quarterfinals	Semifinals	Final / BM	
Athlete	Event	Score	Seed	Opposition Score	Opposition Score	Opposition Score	Opposition Score	Opposition Score	Opposition Score	Rank
Ulukbek Kursanaliev	Men's individual	616	37	Htike (MYA); L 0–6	did not advance					
Diana Kanatbek Kyzy	Women's individual	480	65	did not advance						
Aiturgan Mamamtkulova	Women's individual	584	37	Wu (HKG); L 5–6	did not advance					
Asel Sharbekova	Women's individual	620	25	Al-Ahmed (UAE); W 6–2	Loc (VIE); L 4–6	did not advance				
Diana Kanatbek Kyzy; Aiturgan Mamamtkulova; Asel Sharbekova	Women's team	1684	14	—N/a		China; L 0–6	did not advance			
Ulukbek Kursanaliev; Asel Sharbekova	Mixed team	1236	16	—N/a	Nepal; W 5–4	South Korea; L 0–6	did not advance			

== Athletics ==
Kyrgyzstan entered nine athletes (4 men's and 5 women's) to participate in the athletics competition at the Games.

== Basketball ==
Summary

Team	Event	Group Stage					Quarterfinal	Semifinals / Pl.	Final / BM / Pl.	
Team	Event	Opposition Score	Opposition Score	Opposition Score	Opposition Score	Rank	Opposition Score	Opposition Score	Opposition Score	Rank
Kyrgyzstan men's	Men's 3x3 tournament	Bangladesh; W 10−7	South Korea; L 12−21	Mongolia; L 15−22	Chinese Taipei; L 7−21	4	did not advance			

=== 3x3 basketball ===
Kyrgyzstan national 3x3 team participated in the Games, the men's team placed in the pool B based on the FIBA 3x3 federation ranking.

==== Men's tournament ====
Roster

The following is the Kyrgyzstan roster in the men's 3x3 basketball tournament of the 2018 Asian Games.

- Omurbek Atabekov (7)
- Sherzat Kenenov (8)
- Artem Mushtruev (23)
- Roman Demchenko (24)

Pool B

Pos	Team	Pld	W	L	PF	PA	PD	Qualification
1	South Korea	4	4	0	83	46	+37	Quarterfinals
2	Chinese Taipei	4	3	1	79	50	+29	Quarterfinals
3	Mongolia	4	2	2	63	68	−5	
4	Kyrgyzstan	4	1	3	44	71	−27	
5	Bangladesh	4	0	4	35	69	−34	

Source: OCA

22 August
15:00

Kyrgyzstan	10–7	Bangladesh
Pts: Demchenko 5		Pts: Chowdhury 4

Gelora Bung Karno Tennis Center Court, Jakarta
Referees: Quinn (INA), Ibragimow (TKM)

22 August
16:00

Kyrgyzstan	12–21	South Korea
Pts: Mushtruev 4		Pts: Yang 8

Gelora Bung Karno Tennis Center Court, Jakarta
Referees: Rulyov (KAZ), Liu (MAS)

25 August
19:00

Mongolia	22–15	Kyrgyzstan
Pts: Enkhbaatar 9		Pts: Mushtruev 6

Gelora Bung Karno Tennis Center Court, Jakarta
Referees: Lim (MAS), Ibragimow (TKM)

25 August
20:10

Chinese Taipei	21–7	Kyrgyzstan
Pts: Chou 7		Pts: Atabekov, Demchenko 3

Gelora Bung Karno Tennis Center Court, Jakarta
Referees: Ibragimow (TKM), Al-Harthi (OMA)

== Boxing ==
Men

Athlete	Event	Round of 32	Round of 16	Quarterfinals	Semifinals	Final	Rank
Athlete	Event	Opposition Result	Opposition Result	Opposition Result	Opposition Result	Opposition Result	Rank
Mirlan Turkbai Uulu	–49 kg	Bye	HAN Naser (IRQ); TKO	H Dusmatov (UZB); L 0–5	did not advance		
Azal Usenaliev	–52 kg	V Akkhasith (LAO); W 5–0	SM Asif (PAK); W 5–0	O T-b (PRK); W 5–0	J Latipov (UZB); L 1–4	Did not advance	3rd place, bronze medalist(s)
Sirozhiddin Abdullaev	–56 kg	Bye	SA Amoragam (INA); L 0–4	did not advance			
Argen Kadyrbek Uulu	–60 kg	Bye	T Samdrup (BHU); RSC	S Abdurasulov (UZB); L 2–3	did not advance		
Nurlan Kobashev	–64 kg	H Erseker (QAT); W 5–0	D Rangi (IND); L 0–3	did not advance			
Abdurakhman Abdurakhmanov	–69 kg	Bye	M Kumar (IND); W 5–0	A Shymbergenov (KAZ); L 0–5	did not advance		

Women

Athlete	Event	Round of 32	Round of 16	Quarterfinals	Semifinals	Final	Rank
Athlete	Event	Opposition Result	Opposition Result	Opposition Result	Opposition Result	Opposition Result	Rank
Farida Pupova	–60 kg	—N/a	H Hasanah (INA); L 0–5	did not advance			

== Canoeing ==
=== Slalom ===
Athlete	Event	Heats		Semifinal		Final	
Athlete	Event	Best	Rank	Time	Rank	Time	Rank
Maksim Serditov	Men's K-1	163.35	16	did not advance			

=== Sprint ===
Athlete	Event	Heats		Semifinal		Final	
Athlete	Event	Time	Rank	Time	Rank	Time	Rank
Ruslan Moltaev	Men's K-1 200 m	37.419	3 QF	Bye		36.932	5

== Cycling ==
=== Road ===
Athlete	Event	Final	
Athlete	Event	Time	Rank
Eugen Wacker	Men's time trial	1:03:34.12	11

== Equestrian ==
Jumping

Athlete	Horse	Event	Qualification		Qualifier 1			Qualifier 2 Team Final			Final round A			Final round B		
Athlete	Horse	Event	Points	Rank	Penalties	Total	Rank	Penalties	Total	Rank	Penalties	Total	Rank	Penalties	Total	Rank
Rinat Galimov	Dukato M	Individual	10.70	41	8	18.70	39 Q	12	30.70	42 Q	5	35.70	27 Q	13	48.70	22
Kamil Sabitov	Quintendro	Individual	6.87	30	17	23.87	47 Q	Retired			did not advance					
Andrei Shalohin	Carmen	Individual	8.38	34	17 #	25.38	48 Q	Not started			did not advance					
Olga Sorokina	Corina	Individual	14.68 #	56	12	26.68	51	did not advance								
Olga Sorokina; Rinat Galimov; Kamil Sabitov; Andrei Shalohin	See above	Team	25.95	10	37	62.95	12	did not advance			—N/a					

# – indicates that the score of this rider does not count in the team competition, since only the best three results of a team are counted.

== Esports (demonstration) ==
Hearthstone

Athlete	ID	Event	Quarterfinals	Semifinals	Final / BM	
Athlete	ID	Event	Opposition Score	Opposition Score	Opposition Score	Rank
Artur Mukashov	Gambit	Hearthstone	Hong Kong; L 0–3	did not advance		

== Fencing ==
Individual

Athlete	Event	Preliminary		Round of 32	Round of 16	Quarterfinals	Semifinals	Final	
Athlete	Event	Opposition Score	Rank	Opposition Score	Opposition Score	Opposition Score	Opposition Score	Opposition Score	Rank
Khasan Baudunov	Men's épée	K Minobe (JPN): W 5–1; R Pratama (INA): W 5–3; Ho WH (HKG): L 2–5; M Mirzaei (QAT): W 5–4; R Kurbanov (KAZ): L 1–5	4 Q	M Esmaeili (IRI); W 15–6	Shi GF (CHN); L 9–15	did not advance			13
Roman Petrov	Men's épée	Fong HS (HKG): L 3–5; Nguyễn TN (VIE): L 3–5; M Esmaeili (IRI): W 5–3; K Kano (JPN): L 2–5; T Chantharapidok (THA): L 4–5	5 Q	Fong HS (HKG); W 14–13	D Alexanin (KAZ); L 10–15	did not advance			16
Kamilia Abdyl Khamitova	Women's épée	Sun YW (CHN): L 0–5; Goh BH (MAS): W 5–3; A Riyati (INA): W 5–2; A Alibekova (KAZ): W 5–4; C Lim (SGP): L 2–5	3 Q	U Balaganskaya (KAZ); L 9–15	did not advance				18

Team

Athlete	Event	Round of 16	Quarterfinals	Semifinals	Final	
Athlete	Event	Opposition Score	Opposition Score	Opposition Score	Opposition Score	Rank
Kubatbek Abdrakhman Uulu; Khasan Baudunov; Roman Petrov; Daanyshman Zhumabai Uulu	Men's épée	Iran (IRI); L 44–45	did not advance			9

== Football ==
Kyrgyzstan men's team entered the group E.

Summary

Team	Event	Group Stage				Round of 16	Quarterfinal	Semifinal	Final / BM	
Team	Event	Opposition Score	Opposition Score	Opposition Score	Rank	Opposition Score	Opposition Score	Opposition Score	Opposition Score	Rank
Kyrgyzstan men's	Men's tournament	Malaysia; L 1–3	Bahrain; D 2–2	South Korea; L 0–1	4	did not advance				20

=== Men's tournament ===
Roster

The following is the Kyrgyzstan squad in the men's football tournament of the 2018 Asian Games.

Head coach: (Kyrgyzstan) Igor Kudarenko

No.	Pos.	Player	Date of birth (age)	Caps	Goals	Club
1	GK	Kalysbek Akimaliev*	16 November 1992 (aged 25)			(Kyrgyz Football Union) Abdysh-Ata
13	GK	Kutman Kadyrbekov	13 June 1997 (aged 21)			(Kyrgyz Football Union) Dordoi
2	DF	Mustafa Iusupov	1 July 1995 (aged 23)			(Kyrgyz Football Union) Dordoi
3	DF	Tamirlan Kozubaev* (captain)	1 July 1994 (aged 24)			(Kyrgyz Football Union) Dordoi
4	DF	Askarbek Saliev	25 May 1995 (aged 23)			(Kyrgyz Football Union) Dordoi
5	DF	Aizar Akmatov	24 August 1998 (aged 19)			(Kyrgyz Football Union) Alga
6	DF	Azat Murzashev	18 January 1997 (aged 21)			(Kyrgyz Football Union) Abdysh-Ata
19	DF	Andrei Dolzhenko	23 August 1995 (aged 22)			(Kyrgyz Football Union) Ilbirs
7	MF	Atay Dzhumashev	21 February 1998 (aged 20)			(Kyrgyz Football Union) Neftchi
8	MF	Azim Azarov	20 September 1996 (aged 21)			(Kyrgyz Football Union) Dordoi
10	MF	Odiljon Abdurakhmanov	18 March 1996 (aged 22)			(Kyrgyz Football Union) Alay
14	MF	Davliatzhan Baratov	17 January 1995 (aged 23)			(Kyrgyz Football Union) Alay
15	MF	Kurmantai Nurtay	9 July 1997 (aged 21)			(Kyrgyz Football Union) Ilbirs
16	MF	Eldiyar Sardarbekov	5 April 1995 (aged 23)			(Kyrgyz Football Union) Alay
17	MF	Temirbolot Tapaev	1 August 1999 (aged 19)			(Kyrgyz Football Union) Dordoi
9	FW	Kadyrbek Shaarbekov	2 February 1998 (aged 20)			(Kyrgyz Football Union) Dordoi
11	FW	Kairat Zhyrgalbek Uulu*	13 June 1993 (aged 25)			(Kyrgyz Football Union) Dordoi
12	FW	Amanbek Manybekov	5 August 1995 (aged 23)			(Kyrgyz Football Union) Abdysh-Ata
18	FW	Ernist Batyrkanov	21 February 1998 (aged 20)			(Kyrgyz Football Union) Dordoi

* Over-aged player.

Group E

Pos	Team	Pld	W	D	L	GF	GA	GD	Pts	Qualification
1	Malaysia	3	2	0	1	7	5	+2	6 (Note: Head-to-head result: Malaysia 2–1 South Korea.)	Advance to knockout stage
2	South Korea	3	2	0	1	8	2	+6	6	Advance to knockout stage
3	Bahrain	3	1	1	1	5	10	−5	4	Advance to knockout stage
4	Kyrgyzstan	3	0	1	2	3	6	−3	1	
5	United Arab Emirates	0	0	0	0	0	0	0	0	Redrawn to Group C

Source: Asian Games 2018
Rules for classification: Group stage tiebreakers
Notes:
15 August 2018
16:00 UTC+7

Kyrgyzstan	1–3	Malaysia
Batyrkanov 55'	Report	Safawi 38' (pen.); Akhyar 60'; Syafiq 78'

Jalak Harupat Stadium, Soreang
Referee: Lau Fong Hei (Hong Kong)

17 August 2018
16:00 UTC+7

Bahrain	2–2	Kyrgyzstan
Marhoon 20'; Sanad 90+4'	Report	Abdurakhmanov 59'; Batyrkanov 82'

Jalak Harupat Stadium, Soreang
Referee: Nivon Robesh Gamini (Sri Lanka)

20 August 2018
19:00 UTC+7

South Korea	1–0	Kyrgyzstan
Son Heung-min 63'	Report

Jalak Harupat Stadium, Soreang
Referee: Masoud Tufaylieh (Syria)

== Ju-jitsu ==
Key:

- ADV – Won by advantages.
- RDC – Won by referee decision.
- SUB – Won by submission.

Men

Athlete	Event	Round of 64	Round of 32	Round of 16	Quarterfinals	Semifinals	Repechage	Final / BM	Rank
Athlete	Event	Opposition Result	Opposition Result	Opposition Result	Opposition Result	Opposition Result	Opposition Result	Opposition Result	Rank
Ariet Bekishov	–56 kg	—N/a	Liu HK (CHN); DSQ	H Nawad (UAE); L 0–2	did not advance				
Davron Marazykov	–56 kg	—N/a	K Meredow (TKM); L 0–2	did not advance					
Alymgeldi Abdizhamil Uulu	–62 kg	—N/a	W Jangsawang (THA); W 7–2	R Subkhonov (UZB); W 2–0	O Al-Fadhli (UAE); L 0–2	Did not advance	D Hilal (LBN); L 0–100^{SUB}	did not advance	
Abdyldabek Kekenov	–62 kg	—N/a	Bye	S Soonthorn (THA); W 2–0	D Nortayev (KAZ); L 0–2	Did not advance	M Agaýew (TKM); L 0–0^{ADV}	did not advance	
Torokan Bagynbai Uulu	–69 kg	—N/a	AH Khademian (IRI); W 0^{ADV}–0	M Khabibulla (KAZ); W 0^{ADV}–0	J Hojamyradow (TKM); W 2–0	B Lertthaisong (THA); W 4–2	—N/a	T Al-Kirbi (UAE); W 2–0	1st place, gold medalist(s)
Zhakshylyk Uranov	–69 kg	—N/a	A Setdarow (TKM); W 2–0	A Mones (YEM); W 100^{SUB}–0	T Al-Kirbi (UAE); L 0–2	Did not advance	G Al-Harahsheh (JOR); W 100^{SUB}–0	B Lertthaisong (THA); L 0–5	–
Nursultan Alymkulov	–77 kg	Bye	M Mumtaz (PAK); W 100^{SUB}–0	M Sharipov (UZB); W 16–0	M Al-Qubaisi (UAE); W 2^{ADV}–2	A Al-Rasheed (JOR); W 2–0	—N/a	R Israilov (KAZ); L 0–2	2nd place, silver medalist(s)
Aiazbek Mustakov	–77 kg	Bye	R Taganow (TKM); W 0^{RDC}–0	Willy (INA); W 100^{SUB}–0	R Israilov (KAZ); L 0–4	Did not advance	S Al-Hammadi (UAE); L 0–4	did not advance	
Abdurahmanhaji Murtazaliev	–85 kg	—N/a	Wei C-c (TPE); W 2^{ADV}–2	R Gunawan (INA); W 2–0	Q Maraaba (PLE); W 100^{SUB}–0	H Al-Rasheed (JOR); L 0–0^{ADV}	Bye	A Gavriluk (KAZ); W 0^{ADV}–0	3rd place, bronze medalist(s)
Murtazali Murtazaliev	–85 kg	—N/a	K Möngönbayar (MGL); W 15–0	M Hamidi (IRI); W 0^{ADV}–0	A Gavriluk (KAZ); W 0^{RDC}–0	K Balhol (UAE); L 0–2	Bye	M Joraýew (TKM); W 0^{RDC}–0	3rd place, bronze medalist(s)
Ruslan Sagdeev	–94 kg	—N/a	R Kussainov (KAZ); L 0–0^{ADV}	did not advance					

== Judo ==
Kyrgyzstan put up 8 (6 men's and 2 women's) athletes for judo competition at the Games.

Key:

- 1st number — Ippon
- 2nd number — Waza-ari
- s — Shido

Men

Athlete	Event	Round of 32	Round of 16	Quarterfinals	Semifinals	Repechage	Final / BM	Rank
Athlete	Event	Opposition Result	Opposition Result	Opposition Result	Opposition Result	Opposition Result	Opposition Result	Rank
Otar Bestaev	–60 kg	Bye	An J-y (PRK); L 00s2–10s2	did not advance				
Artur Te	–66 kg	Bye	M Al-Saedi (IRQ); W 01–00	J Maruyama (JPN); L 00s3–10s1	Did not advance	B Erkhembayar (MGL); W 10–00	S Akhadov (UZB); W 01s2–00s1	3rd place, bronze medalist(s)
Bektur Rysmambetov	–73 kg	C Repiyallage (SRI); W 10–01s1	T Tsend-Ochir (MGL); W 10s2–00s1	M Mohammadi (IRI); L 00s1–01	Did not advance	B Khojazoda (TJK); W 10–00s2	V Scvortov (UAE); L 00s2–10s1	–
Vladimir Zoloev	–81 kg	Bye	M Kasem (SYR); W 10s1–00s3	Lee S-s (KOR); L 00s1–01s1	Did not advance	Gao HY (CHN); W 11s1–00	T Sakaki (JPN); W 10s1–00	3rd place, bronze medalist(s)
Faruh Bulekulov	+100 kg	Bye	M Baker (JPN); L 00s3–10	did not advance				
Bekbolot Toktogonov	–81 kg	—N/a	Chen S-m (TPE); W 10–00	J Mahjoub (IRI); L 00s1–01	Did not advance	S Mirmamadov (TJK); L 00–10	did not advance	

Women

Athlete	Event	Round of 32	Round of 16	Quarterfinals	Semifinals	Repechage	Final / BM	Rank
Athlete	Event	Opposition Result	Opposition Result	Opposition Result	Opposition Result	Opposition Result	Opposition Result	Rank
Kseniia Beldiagina	–52 kg	Bye	G Babamuratowa (TKM); L 00s2–01	did not advance				
Aizhan Kadyrbekova	–70 kg	—N/a	T Naranjargal (MGL); L 00–10	did not advance				

== Kurash ==
Men

Athlete	Event	Round of 32	Round of 16	Quarterfinal	Semifinal	Final	
Athlete	Event	Opposition Score	Opposition Score	Opposition Score	Opposition Score	Opposition Score	Rank
Mirlan Eraliev	–66 kg	S Yuosuf (AFG); L 000−101	did not advance				
Sanzhar Osmonaliev	–66 kg	GA Ghanbari (IRI); L 000−110	did not advance				
Shatman Esenbek Uulu	–81 kg	MA Malikyar (KAZ); W 010−000	B Gaajadamba (MGL); L 001−001	did not advance			
Tilek Kuralov	+90 kg	C Hofmann (PHI); W 111−000	H Jumaýew (TKM); W 100−001	J Pahlevani (IRI); L 000−100	did not advance		

== Modern pentathlon ==
Athlete	Event	Swimming (200 m freestyle)		Fencing (épée one touch)		Riding (show jumping)		Laser-run (shooting 10 m air pistol/ running 3200 m)		Total points	Final rank
Athlete	Event	Rank	MP points	Rank	MP points	Rank	MP points	Rank	MP points	Total points	Final rank
Temirlan Aitimbetov	Men's	9	296	6	210	6	293	14	467	1266	9
Radion Khripchenko	Men's	11	293	9	191	5	293	6	592	1369	7
Mariia Shtukina	Women's	11	252	6	218	1	300	10	336	1106	8

== Pencak silat ==
Tanding

Athlete	Event	Round of 16	Quarterfinals	Semifinals	Final	
Athlete	Event	Opposition Result	Opposition Result	Opposition Result	Opposition Result	Rank
Turatbek Sulaimankul Uulu	Men's –55 kg	Bye	NB Singh (IND); L 0–5	did not advance		
Almaz Toichuev	Men's –60 kg	Bye	A Chemaeng (THA); L 0–5	did not advance		
Almazbek Zamirov	Men's –65 kg	Bye	J Loon (PHI); L 0–4	did not advance		
Zholdoshbek Akimkanov	Men's –70 kg	Bye	U Farooq (PAK); W 5–0	MA Jamari (MAS); WO	Did not advance	3rd place, bronze medalist(s)
Daniiar Tokurov	Men's –75 kg	Bye	RA Raza (PAK); W 5–0	Trần ĐN (VIE); L 0–5	Did not advance	3rd place, bronze medalist(s)
Rashit Amankulov	Men's –95 kg	Bye	Nguyễn VT (VIE); L 0–5	did not advance		
Mihrinsa Niiazova	Women's –55 kg	S Lueangaphichatkun (THA); L 0–5	did not advance			
Tolgonai Kalnazarova	Women's –60 kg	Bye	NO Vongphakdy (LAO); L 0–5	did not advance		
Alina Kamalova	Women's –65 kg	—N/a	T Karbalaei (IRI); WO	did not advance		

== Sambo ==
Key:

- SU – Won by submission.

Athlete	Event	Round of 32	Round of 16	Quarterfinal	Semifinal	Repechage 1	Repechage 2	Repechage final	Final / BM	
Athlete	Event	Opposition Result	Opposition Result	Opposition Result	Opposition Result	Opposition Result	Opposition Result	Opposition Result	Opposition Result	Rank
Tilek Amankulov	Men's 52 kg	Bye	IM Muttaqin (INA); L 1–3	did not advance						
Azamat Asakeev	Men's 52 kg	Bye	S Erdenebaatar (MGL); L 5–7	did not advance		Bye	M Ghusn (SYR); L 1–2	did not advance		
Urmat Mambetzhan Uulu	Men's 90 kg	Bye	N Yokubov (UZB); L 0–1	did not advance						
Anara Zhumali Kyzy	Women's 48 kg	—N/a	A Nazarowa (TKM); W 1–0	MM Ince (INA); L 1–6	Did not advance	Bye	—N/a	N Gulova (UZB); L 0–4	did not advance	
Anara Estebesova	Women's 68 kg	Bye	D Kuryshbayeva (KAZ); L 1–4^{SU}	did not advance		Bye	N Tomi (JPN); L 0–4^{SU}	did not advance		
Aizhan Kadyrbekova	Women's 68 kg	Bye	A Khani (IRI); W 1–0	D Kudarova (KAZ); L 1–3	Did not advance	Bye	T Battsetseg (MGL); L 2–10	did not advance		

== Shooting ==
Men

Athlete	Event	Qualification		Final	
Athlete	Event	Points	Rank	Points	Rank
Sergei Arzamastsev	10 m air pistol	508	39	did not advance	
Sanzharbek Erkinbaev	10 m air pistol	492	40	did not advance	

Women

Athlete	Event	Qualification		Final	
Athlete	Event	Points	Rank	Points	Rank
Tumar Kasmalieva	10 m air rifle	596.7	43	did not advance	
Anastasiia Shchukovskaia	10 m air rifle	612.2	26	did not advance	

== Swimming ==
Men

Athlete	Event	Heats		Final	
Athlete	Event	Time	Rank	Time	Rank
Denis Petrashov	50 m breaststroke	28.73	16	did not advance	
Denis Petrashov	100 m breaststroke	1:02.12	11	did not advance	
Denis Petrashov	200 m breaststroke	2:12.89	4 Q	2:12.19 (NR)	5
Vladislav Shuliko	50 m butterfly	24.94	18	did not advance	
Vladislav Shuliko	100 m butterfly	55.06	21	did not advance	

Women

Athlete	Event	Heats		Final	
Athlete	Event	Time	Rank	Time	Rank
Elizaveta Rogozhnikova	100 m freestyle	58.38	15	did not advance	
Elizaveta Rogozhnikova	200 m freestyle	2:07.92	15	did not advance	
Elizaveta Rogozhnikova	200 m backstroke	2:21.67	12	did not advance	
Elizaveta Rogozhnikova	200 m individual medley	2:25.78	13	did not advance	
Elizaveta Rogozhnikova	400 m individual medley	5:12.47	11	did not advance	

== Table tennis ==
Individual

Athlete	Event	Round 1	Round 2	Round of 16	Quarterfinals	Semifinals	Final	
Athlete	Event	Opposition Score	Opposition Score	Opposition Score	Opposition Score	Opposition Score	Opposition Score	Rank
Alisher Iakupbaev	Men's singles	Leong CF (MAS); L 0–4	did not advance					
Talgat Sagyndykov	Men's singles	A Al-Naggar (QAT); L 1–4	did not advance					

Team

Athlete	Event	Group Stage					Quarterfinal	Semifinal	Final	
Athlete	Event	Opposition Score	Opposition Score	Opposition Score	Opposition Score	Rank	Opposition Score	Opposition Score	Opposition Score	Rank
Talgat Sagyndykov; Alisher Iakupbaev; Aziz Kydyrbaev	Men's	Thailand (THA); L 0–3	Iran (IRI); L 0–3	Japan (JPN); L 0–3	Maldives (MDV); W 3–1	4	did not advance			

== Tennis ==
Men

Athlete	Event	Round of 64	Round of 32	Round of 16	Quarterfinals	Semifinals	Final	
Athlete	Event	Opposition Score	Opposition Score	Opposition Score	Opposition Score	Opposition Score	Opposition Score	Rank
Evgeniy Babak	Singles	S Khaledan (IRI); WO	did not advance					
Farkhad Urumbaev	Singles	AH Badi (IRI); WO	did not advance					

Women

Athlete	Event	Round of 64	Round of 32	Round of 16	Quarterfinals	Semifinals	Final	
Athlete	Event	Opposition Score	Opposition Score	Opposition Score	Opposition Score	Opposition Score	Opposition Score	Rank
Ksenia Palkina	Singles	Bye	Zhang L (HKG); WO	did not advance				

== Volleyball ==
Kyrgyzstan Volleyball Federation sent the men's team squad under the captain Kanybek Uulu Onelbek who competed in pool A at the Games.

=== Indoor volleyball ===
Team	Event	Group Stage		Playoffs	Quarterfinals / Pl.	Semifinals / Pl.	Final / BM / Pl.	
Team	Event	Oppositions Scores	Rank	Opposition Score	Opposition Score	Opposition Score	Opposition Score	Rank
Kyrgyzstan men's	Men's tournament	Saudi Arabia: L 1–3; Indonesia: L 0–3	3	Did not advance	Kazakhstan; W 3–2	Vietnam; L 0–3	Nepal; L 0–3	16

==== Men's tournament ====
Team roster

The following is the Kyrgyzstan roster in the men's volleyball tournament of the 2018 Asian Games.

Head coach: Andrei Akkudinov

No.	Name	Date of birth	Height	Weight	Spike	Block	Club
1	Manazbek Nuraly Uulu	29 September 1993	1.75 m (5 ft 9 in)	67 kg (148 lb)	280 cm (110 in)	260 cm (100 in)	(Kyrgyzstan) Aksi
2	Kutmanbek Absatarov	26 December 1995	1.75 m (5 ft 9 in)	72 kg (159 lb)	280 cm (110 in)	260 cm (100 in)	(Kyrgyzstan) Salam-Alik
3	Medetbek Ergesh Uulu	20 January 1994	1.75 m (5 ft 9 in)	78 kg (172 lb)	290 cm (110 in)	285 cm (112 in)	(Kyrgyzstan) Ular
4	Kylychbek Sarbaghyshev	30 May 1978	1.89 m (6 ft 2 in)	85 kg (187 lb)	300 cm (120 in)	290 cm (110 in)	(Kyrgyzstan) Salam-Alik
5	Nurmukhammed Toktoev	24 November 1994	1.78 m (5 ft 10 in)	78 kg (172 lb)	300 cm (120 in)	290 cm (110 in)	(Kyrgyzstan) Darhan OşTU
6	Emil Idirisov	21 May 1996	1.89 m (6 ft 2 in)	85 kg (187 lb)	310 cm (120 in)	300 cm (120 in)	(Kyrgyzstan) EREM
7	Onolbek Kanybek Uulu (c)	17 August 1991	1.97 m (6 ft 6 in)	92 kg (203 lb)	320 cm (130 in)	310 cm (120 in)	(Kyrgyzstan) Jaŋı-Muun
8	Damir Gazinur Uulu	7 July 1993	1.89 m (6 ft 2 in)	75 kg (165 lb)	310 cm (120 in)	300 cm (120 in)	(Kyrgyzstan) Jaŋı-Muun
9	Temir Musa Uulu	4 December 1994	1.85 m (6 ft 1 in)	80 kg (180 lb)	300 cm (120 in)	290 cm (110 in)	(Kyrgyzstan) Ular
10	Talgat Chalmashbekov	7 December 1991	1.78 m (5 ft 10 in)	80 kg (180 lb)	300 cm (120 in)	290 cm (110 in)	(Kyrgyzstan) Salam-Alik
13	Roman Shilov	7 January 1998	2.13 m (7 ft 0 in)	100 kg (220 lb)	320 cm (130 in)	310 cm (120 in)	(Kyrgyzstan) Salam-Alik
14	Azamat Zhumabekov	28 October 1997	1.87 m (6 ft 2 in)	100 kg (220 lb)	320 cm (130 in)	310 cm (120 in)	(Kyrgyzstan) Ular

Pool A

Pos	Team	Pld	W	L	Pts	SW	SL	SR	SPW	SPL	SPR	Qualification
1	Saudi Arabia	2	2	0	6	6	2	3.000	186	167	1.114	Classification for 1–12
2	Indonesia	2	1	1	3	4	3	1.333	164	149	1.101	Classification for 1–12
3	Kyrgyzstan	2	0	2	0	1	6	0.167	136	170	0.800	Classification for 13–20

Source: OCA

Date	Time		Score		Set 1	Set 2	Set 3	Set 4	Set 5	Total	Report
20 Aug	10:00	Saudi Arabia	3–1	Kyrgyzstan	25–18	20–25	25–18	25–17		95–78	Report
24 Aug	16:30	Kyrgyzstan	0–3	Indonesia	21–25	17–25	20–25			58–75	Report
28 Aug	16:30	Kazakhstan	2–3	Kyrgyzstan	29–27	20–25	25–23	23–25	7–15	104–115	Report
30 Aug	19:00	Vietnam	3–0	Kyrgyzstan	25–16	26–24	29–27			80–67	Report
31 Aug	17:00	Nepal	3–0	Kyrgyzstan	25–0	25–0	25–0			75–0	Report

== Weightlifting ==
Uzbekistan weightlifter clinched five medals at the Games. Ruslan Nurudinov who competed in men's −105 kg broke the Asian Games record in clean and jerk by lifting 230 kg, and also in total lifting 421 kg.

Men

Athlete	Event	Snatch		Clean & Jerk		Total	Rank
Athlete	Event	Result	Rank	Result	Rank	Total	Rank
Izzat Artykov	−69 kg	147	2	183	3	330	3rd place, bronze medalist(s)
Bekdoolot Rasulbekov	−94 kg	165	5	201	5	366	5

Women

Athlete	Event	Snatch		Clean & Jerk		Total	Rank
Athlete	Event	Result	Rank	Result	Rank	Total	Rank
Zhanyl Okoeva	−48 kg	72	8	95	8	167	8

== Wrestling ==
Kyrgyzstan wrestler won 8 medals at the Games. The team captured 4 medals (2 silver and 2 bronze), in the Greco-Roman and freestyle events respectively.

Key:

- F – Victory by fall.
- PP – Decision by points – the loser with technical points.
- PO – Decision by points – the loser without technical points.
- ST – Great superiority – the loser without technical points and a margin of victory of at least 8 (Greco-Roman) or 10 (freestyle) points.

Men's freestyle

Athlete	Event	Qualification	Round of 16	Quarterfinal	Semifinal	Repechage 1	Repechage 2	Final / BM	
Athlete	Event	Opposition Result	Opposition Result	Opposition Result	Opposition Result	Opposition Result	Opposition Result	Opposition Result	Rank
Almaz Smanbekov	−57 kg	Kim S-g (KOR); L 6–7	did not advance						12
Alibek Osmonov	−65 kg	M J Sadeed (AFG); W 13–3	Y Katai (CHN); L 4–13	did not advance					8
Aligadzhi Gamidgadzhiev	−86 kg	Bye	Kim G-u (KOR); W 10–0	D Abounader (LBN); L 7–8	Did not advance	Bye	Chamnanjan (THA); W 2^{F}–0	Davlumbayev (KAZ); L 0–3	5
Magomed Musaev	−97 kg	—N/a	Z Saparow (TKM); W 8–2	N Ahmadi (AFG); W 6–3	Kim J-g (KOR); L 1–1 ^{PP}	Bye	—N/a	A Karimi (IRI); L 0–6	2nd place, silver medalist(s)

Men's Greco-Roman

Athlete	Event	Round of 16	Quarterfinal	Semifinal	Repechage	Final / BM	
Athlete	Event	Opposition Result	Opposition Result	Opposition Result	Opposition Result	Opposition Result	Rank
Kanybek Zholchubekov	−60 kg	Ri S-u (PRK); W 10–2	Walihan S (CHN); W 6–1	M Ainagulov (KAZ); W 9–0	Bye	S Ota (JPN); L 3–8^{F}	2nd place, silver medalist(s)
Amantur Ismailov	−67 kg	M Al-Maghrebi (YEM); W 9–0	Ryu H-s (KOR); L 1–1 ^{PP}	Did not advance	P Deemark (THA); W 10–0	Zhang GQ (CHN); W 6–1	3rd place, bronze medalist(s)
Akzhol Makhmudov	−77 kg	Kim H-w (KOR); W 7–3	B Nalgiev (UZB); W 6–4	S Permanow (TKM); W 8–0	Bye	M A Geraei (IRI); L 3–7	2nd place, silver medalist(s)
Samat Shirdakov	−87 kg	L G Saputra (INA); WO	R Assakalov (UZB); L 0–9	Did not advance	A Kustubayev (KAZ); L 1–3	Did not advance	7
Uzur Dzhuzupbekov	−97 kg	Bye	Y Nara (JPN); W 7–1	Xiao D (CHN); L 1–8^{F}	Bye	J Turdiev (UZB); W 2–0	3rd place, bronze medalist(s)
Murat Ramonov	−130 kg	B Mehdizadeh (IRI); L 3–10^{C}	did not advance				10

Women's freestyle

Athlete	Event	Round of 16	Quarterfinal	Semifinal	Repechage	Final / BM	
Athlete	Event	Opposition Result	Opposition Result	Opposition Result	Opposition Result	Opposition Result	Rank
Aisuluu Tynybekova	−62 kg	Rim S-j (PRK); W 6–6 ^{PP}	Xu R (CHN); W 3–0	S Malik (IND); W 9–7	Bye	P Orkhon (MGL); L 0–11	2nd place, silver medalist(s)
Meerim Zhumanazarova	−68 kg	N Kaewkhuanchum (THA); W 4^{F}–0	Jang E-s (KOR); W 10–0	Zhou F (CHN); L 2–9^{F}	Bye	A Gempei (JPN); W 7–3	3rd place, bronze medalist(s)
Aiperi Medet Kyzy	−76 kg	R W Ridwan (INA); W 12–0	K Bishnoi (IND); W 4–2	H Minagawa (JPN); L 1–2	—N/a	O Nasanburmaa (MGL); W 4–2	3rd place, bronze medalist(s)

== Wushu ==
Sanda

Athlete	Event	Round of 32	Round of 16	Quarterfinal	Semifinal	Final	
Athlete	Event	Opposition Score	Opposition Score	Opposition Score	Opposition Score	Opposition Score	Rank
Avazbek Amanbekov	Men's –56 kg	Bye	Lam M K (HKG); W 2–1	Shen GS (CHN); L 0–0 ^{TV}	did not advance		
Rustam Ibragimov	Men's –60 kg	Bye	A Duiseyev (KAZ); W 2–0	Wang XT (CHN); L 0–0 ^{TV}	did not advance		
Kanatbek Abduganiev	Men's –65 kg	—N/a	A Rakhimov (UZB); L 0–2	did not advance			
Zhoomart Keldeibai Uulu	Men's –70 kg	—N/a	A Isroilov (UZB); W 2–0	Ham G-s (KOR); L 0–2	did not advance		

Key: * TV – Technical victory.
