= Archery at the 2018 Asian Games – Mixed team recurve =

Mixed team recurve at the 2018 Asian Games
- Venue: Gelora Bung Karno Archery Field
- Dates: 21–27 August 2018
- Competitors: 141 from 24 nations

Medalists
gold medal	Takaharu Furukawa; Tomomi Sugimoto	Japan
silver medal	Pak Yong-won; Kang Un-ju	North Korea
bronze medal	Xu Tianyu; Zhang Xinyan	China

The mixed team recurve archery competition at the 2018 Asian Games was held from 21 to 27 August at Gelora Bung Karno Archery Field.

A total of 24 teams participated in the ranking round to determine the seeds for knockout round. Ranking round classification was ranked based on the combined score of the best men and women archer in the individual ranking round.

== Schedule ==
All times are Western Indonesia Time (UTC+07:00)

Date	Time	Event
Tuesday, 21 August 2018	09:00	Ranking round women
Tuesday, 21 August 2018	14:20	Ranking round men
Friday, 24 August 2018	09:00	1/16 eliminations
Friday, 24 August 2018	09:35	1/8 eliminations
Friday, 24 August 2018	13:00	Quarterfinals
Friday, 24 August 2018	14:20	Semifinals
Monday, 27 August 2018	13:00	Bronze medal match
Monday, 27 August 2018	13:20	Gold medal match

== Results ==
Legend

- DNS — Did not start
- M — Men
- W — Women

=== Ranking round ===
Rank	Team	Half		Total	10s	Xs
Rank	Team	1st	2nd	Total	10s	Xs
1	South Korea (KOR)	683	681	1364	81	28
M	Im Dong-hyun	~~336~~	~~343~~	~~679~~	~~39~~	~~12~~
M	Kim Woo-jin	~~338~~	~~334~~	~~672~~	~~31~~	~~11~~
M	Lee Woo-seok	~~334~~	~~341~~	~~675~~	~~36~~	~~15~~
M	Oh Jin-hyek	340	343	683	41	21
W	Chang Hye-jin	~~335~~	~~342~~	~~677~~	~~32~~	~~11~~
W	Jung Dasomi	~~333~~	~~341~~	~~674~~	~~34~~	~~14~~
W	Kang Chae-young	343	338	681	40	7
W	Lee Eun-gyeong	~~344~~	~~336~~	~~680~~	~~40~~	~~17~~
2	Chinese Taipei (TPE)	671	673	1344	70	25
M	Jao Ting-yu	~~322~~	~~323~~	~~645~~	~~23~~	~~8~~
M	Luo Wei-min	~~319~~	~~330~~	~~649~~	~~28~~	~~8~~
M	Tang Chih-chun	332	338	670	34	12
M	Wei Chun-heng	~~334~~	~~333~~	~~667~~	~~35~~	~~11~~
W	Lei Chien-ying	339	335	674	36	13
W	Lo Hsiao-yuan	~~274~~	~~236~~	~~510~~	~~8~~	~~5~~
W	Peng Chia-mao	~~330~~	~~334~~	~~664~~	~~29~~	~~10~~
W	Tan Ya-ting	~~335~~	~~337~~	~~672~~	~~32~~	~~6~~
3	China (CHN)	673	659	1332	55	16
M	Li Jialun	~~331~~	~~329~~	~~660~~	~~29~~	~~7~~
M	Sun Quan	~~332~~	~~328~~	~~660~~	~~25~~	~~6~~
M	Wei Shaoxuan	~~328~~	~~328~~	~~656~~	~~28~~	~~6~~
M	Xu Tianyu	341	325	666	27	8
W	Cao Hui	~~326~~	~~329~~	~~655~~	~~27~~	~~9~~
W	Zhai Yuejun	~~317~~	~~322~~	~~639~~	~~21~~	~~4~~
W	Zhang Dan	~~302~~	~~324~~	~~626~~	~~6~~	~~11~~
W	Zhang Xinyan	332	334	666	28	8
4	Japan (JPN)	654	677	1331	54	16
M	Takaharu Furukawa	329	339	668	26	9
M	Tomoaki Kuraya	~~326~~	~~320~~	~~646~~	~~23~~	~~8~~
M	Hiroki Muto	~~327~~	~~322~~	~~649~~	~~25~~	~~7~~
W	Ayano Kato	~~325~~	~~318~~	~~643~~	~~21~~	~~3~~
W	Kaori Kawanaka	~~326~~	~~323~~	~~649~~	~~28~~	~~10~~
W	Tomomi Sugimoto	325	338	663	28	7
5	Kazakhstan (KAZ)	660	666	1326	56	17
M	Ilfat Abdullin	335	338	673	34	9
M	Sultan Duzelbayev	~~328~~	~~323~~	~~651~~	~~22~~	~~8~~
M	Denis Gankin	~~329~~	~~340~~	~~669~~	~~34~~	~~12~~
M	Sanzhar Mussayev	~~334~~	~~326~~	~~660~~	~~34~~	~~7~~
W	Karakoz Askarova	~~293~~	~~288~~	~~581~~	~~7~~	~~2~~
W	Alina Ilyassova	~~325~~	~~315~~	~~640~~	~~22~~	~~3~~
W	Luiza Saidiyeva	~~316~~	~~325~~	~~641~~	~~21~~	~~8~~
W	Farida Tukebayeva	325	328	653	22	8
6	Vietnam (VIE)	661	652	1313	57	14
M	Chu Đức Anh	331	324	655	27	8
M	Hoàng Văn Lộc	~~326~~	~~324~~	~~650~~	~~25~~	~~12~~
M	Nguyễn Văn Duy	~~328~~	~~322~~	~~650~~	~~24~~	~~5~~
W	Lê Thị Thu Hiền	~~296~~	~~303~~	~~599~~	~~10~~	~~1~~
W	Lộc Thị Đào	330	328	658	30	6
W	Nguyễn Thị Phương	~~321~~	~~324~~	~~645~~	~~11~~	~~2~~
7	Indonesia (INA)	657	654	1311	46	18
M	Riau Ega Agata	328	321	649	21	9
M	Alek Edwar	~~323~~	~~313~~	~~636~~	~~23~~	~~9~~
M	Okka Bagus Subekti	~~313~~	~~312~~	~~625~~	~~16~~	~~5~~
M	Muhammad Hanif Wijaya	~~299~~	~~314~~	~~613~~	~~13~~	~~9~~
W	Diananda Choirunisa	329	333	662	25	9
W	Aqidatul Izzah	~~310~~	~~305~~	~~615~~	~~14~~	~~3~~
W	Linda Lestari	~~333~~	~~318~~	~~651~~	~~23~~	~~4~~
W	Titik Kusuma Wardani	~~325~~	~~311~~	~~636~~	~~20~~	~~7~~
8	India (IND)	662	647	1309	48	18
M	Jagdish Choudhary	~~314~~	~~324~~	~~638~~	~~19~~	~~7~~
M	Atanu Das	332	328	660	26	8
M	Sukhchain Singh	~~306~~	~~325~~	~~631~~	~~19~~	~~3~~
M	Vishwas	~~328~~	~~330~~	~~658~~	~~26~~	~~10~~
W	Ankita Bhakat	~~320~~	~~297~~	~~617~~	~~14~~	~~3~~
W	Promila Daimary	~~321~~	~~321~~	~~642~~	~~19~~	~~3~~
W	Deepika Kumari	330	319	649	22	10
W	Laxmirani Majhi	~~307~~	~~301~~	~~608~~	~~16~~	~~4~~
9	Mongolia (MGL)	657	641	1298	50	22
M	Baasankhüügiin Adiyaasüren	~~329~~	~~317~~	~~646~~	~~21~~	~~6~~
M	Jantsangiin Gantögs	~~307~~	~~316~~	~~623~~	~~17~~	~~8~~
M	Baatarkhuyagiin Otgonbold	326	330	656	29	13
M	Bataagiin Pürevsüren	~~326~~	~~320~~	~~646~~	~~21~~	~~10~~
W	Nyamjargalyn Ariunbileg	~~301~~	~~312~~	~~613~~	~~13~~	~~4~~
W	Altangereliin Enkhtuyaa	~~314~~	~~307~~	~~621~~	~~19~~	~~8~~
W	Danzandorjiin Miroslava	~~310~~	~~309~~	~~619~~	~~18~~	~~7~~
W	Bishindeegiin Urantungalag	331	311	642	21	9
10	North Korea (PRK)	644	649	1293	44	9
M	Kim Kuk-song	~~313~~	~~305~~	~~618~~	~~17~~	~~8~~
M	Pak Yong-won	319	324	643	22	5
M	Ri Tae-bom	~~312~~	~~310~~	~~622~~	~~17~~	~~2~~
W	Kang Jin-hwa	~~319~~	~~297~~	~~616~~	~~14~~	~~3~~
W	Kang Un-ju	325	325	650	22	4
W	Pak Hyang-sun	~~306~~	~~315~~	~~621~~	~~13~~	~~4~~
W	Ri Ji-hyang	~~321~~	~~313~~	~~634~~	~~17~~	~~4~~
11	Malaysia (MAS)	646	643	1289	44	15
M	Akmal Nor Hasrin	~~322~~	~~335~~	~~657~~	~~28~~	~~8~~
M	Haziq Kamaruddin	~~321~~	~~331~~	~~652~~	~~25~~	~~5~~
M	Khairul Anuar Mohamad	331	327	658	26	12
M	Zarif Syahir Zolkepeli	~~326~~	~~325~~	~~651~~	~~23~~	~~6~~
W	Nur Afisa Abdul Halil	~~302~~	~~311~~	~~613~~	~~13~~	~~2~~
W	Nur Aliya Ghapar	315	316	631	18	3
W	Loke Shin Hui	~~297~~	~~319~~	~~616~~	~~18~~	~~6~~
W	Nuramalia Haneesha Mazlan	~~307~~	~~317~~	~~624~~	~~16~~	~~5~~
12	Bangladesh (BAN)	639	648	1287	49	14
M	Mohammad Tamimul Islam	~~320~~	~~315~~	~~635~~	~~15~~	~~6~~
M	Emdadul Haque Milon	~~322~~	~~319~~	~~641~~	~~22~~	~~6~~
M	Ibrahim Sheik Rezowan	~~320~~	~~323~~	~~643~~	~~19~~	~~9~~
M	Ruman Shana	335	342	677	35	11
W	Nasrin Akter	304	306	610	14	3
W	Ety Khatun	~~293~~	~~300~~	~~593~~	~~6~~	~~4~~
W	Beauty Ray	~~288~~	~~295~~	~~583~~	~~8~~	~~4~~
13	Iran (IRI)	647	619	1266	36	16
M	Erfan Arjangipour	~~303~~	~~308~~	~~611~~	~~16~~	~~4~~
M	Sadegh Ashrafi	327	317	644	21	11
M	Amin Pirali	~~320~~	~~314~~	~~634~~	~~22~~	~~11~~
M	Milad Vaziri	~~305~~	~~311~~	~~616~~	~~20~~	~~5~~
W	Zahra Nemati	320	302	622	15	5
14	Myanmar (MYA)	633	630	1263	24	8
M	Htike Lin Oo	317	319	636	19	5
W	Thidar Nwe	316	311	627	5	3
15	Thailand (THA)	624	627	1251	26	7
M	Tanapat Pathairat	317	320	637	16	6
M	Itsarin Thai-uea	~~315~~	~~295~~	~~610~~	~~16~~	~~5~~
M	Witthaya Thamwong	~~323~~	~~307~~	~~630~~	~~18~~	~~7~~
M	Denchai Thepna	~~314~~	~~312~~	~~626~~	~~16~~	~~7~~
W	Nanthinee Jaehomkrue	~~295~~	~~302~~	~~597~~	~~5~~	~~4~~
W	Waraporn Phutdee	307	307	614	10	1
16	Kyrgyzstan (KGZ)	618	618	1236	30	11
M	Ulukbek Kursanaliev	307	309	616	15	6
W	Diana Kanatbek Kyzy	~~226~~	~~254~~	~~480~~	~~3~~	~~1~~
W	Aiturgan Mamatkulova	~~292~~	~~292~~	~~584~~	~~5~~	~~2~~
W	Asel Sharbekova	311	309	620	15	5
17	Nepal (NEP)	610	617	1227	36	13
M	Min Prasad Gauchan	~~308~~	~~289~~	~~597~~	~~10~~	~~2~~
M	Tilak Pun Magar	324	317	641	22	8
M	Roshan Nagarkoti	~~318~~	~~319~~	~~637~~	~~23~~	~~4~~
M	Ashim Sherchan	~~292~~	~~316~~	~~608~~	~~15~~	~~5~~
W	Gyanu Awale	286	300	586	14	5
18	Hong Kong (HKG)	618	606	1224	27	7
M	Chui Chun Man	~~308~~	~~291~~	~~599~~	~~11~~	~~5~~
M	Lee Kar Wai	~~307~~	~~307~~	~~614~~	~~15~~	~~3~~
M	Ma Hing Kin	319	304	623	15	3
M	Wan Tsz Kit	~~300~~	~~295~~	~~595~~	~~12~~	~~5~~
W	Ada Lam	~~310~~	~~291~~	~~601~~	~~12~~	~~4~~
W	Tsui Chung Yan	~~258~~	~~260~~	~~518~~	~~7~~	~~0~~
W	Wang Cheuk Ying	~~291~~	~~304~~	~~595~~	~~10~~	~~4~~
W	Wu Sze Yan	299	302	601	12	4
19	Bhutan (BHU)	608	594	1202	20	3
M	Lam Dorji	~~301~~	~~301~~	~~602~~	~~13~~	~~3~~
M	Kinley Tshering	301	314	615	10	0
M	Nima Wangdi	~~302~~	~~307~~	~~609~~	~~10~~	~~2~~
W	Karma	307	280	587	10	3
W	Sonam Dema	~~271~~	~~289~~	~~560~~	~~6~~	~~2~~
20	Laos (LAO)	594	587	1181	9	2
M	Soulivong Onmanee	302	290	592	6	0
W	Jen Kaboksy	292	297	589	3	2
21	United Arab Emirates (UAE)	550	566	1116	18	6
M	Ahmed Al-Kaabi	~~281~~	~~279~~	~~560~~	~~9~~	~~2~~
M	Hamdan Al-Mansoori	287	299	586	14	5
W	Alya Al-Ahmed	263	267	530	4	1
W	Ghalia Al-Blooshi	~~245~~	~~258~~	~~503~~	~~4~~	~~1~~
22	Tajikistan (TJK)	525	612	1037	15	4
M	Umedzhon Khudoyarov	220	220	440	1	0
W	Mavzuna Azimova			~~DNS~~		
W	Zukhro Tagaeva	~~288~~	~~279~~	~~567~~	~~8~~	~~4~~
W	Firuza Zubaydova	305	292	597	14	4
23	Pakistan (PAK)	519	505	1024	11	2
M	Idrees Majeed	274	284	558	7	2
W	Nabeela Kausar	245	221	466	4	0
—	Qatar (QAT)			DNS		
M	Abdulaziz Al-Abadi	~~296~~	~~280~~	~~576~~	~~11~~	~~2~~
M	Ibrahim Al-Mohanadi	308	315	623	18	1
M	Ali Ahmed Salem	~~279~~	~~300~~	~~579~~	~~10~~	~~2~~
W	Maria Ahmed			DNS		

- South Korea replaced Oh Jin-hyek with Lee Woo-seok and Kang Chae-young with Chang Hye-jin for the knockout round.
- Bhutan replaced Karma with Sonam Dema for the knockout round.

=== Knockout round ===
==== Finals ====
Gold medal match
4	Japan	36	40	38	6
10	North Korea	35	33	36	0

Bronze medal match
9	Mongolia	32	36	34	35	2
3	China	36	35	37	37	6

==== Top half ====
1/16 eliminations
17	Nepal	34	34	32	31	15	4
16	Kyrgyzstan	34	34	20	33	16	5
21	United Arab Emirates	34	33	25	0
12	Bangladesh	39	36	34	6
13	Iran	39	34	36	33	19	5
20	Laos	30	34	38	33	18	4

1/8 eliminations
1	South Korea	37	38	39	6
16	Kyrgyzstan	35	31	35	0
9	Mongolia	35	33	34	37	19	5
8	India	33	38	38	35	17	4
5	Kazakhstan	37	37	35	36	18	4
12	Bangladesh	35	35	38	37	19	5
13	Iran	35	34	31	0
4	Japan	37	39	37	6

Quarterfinals
1	South Korea	34	36	37	1
9	Mongolia	36	37	37	5
12	Bangladesh	34	34	35	1
4	Japan	36	34	36	5

Semifinals
9	Mongolia	32	36	33	35	2
4	Japan	37	30	38	37	6

==== Bottom half ====
1/16 eliminations
19	Bhutan	36	36	28	1
14	Myanmar	36	37	36	5
11	Malaysia	38	34	37	6
22	Tajikistan	24	18	28	0
23	Pakistan	22	30	24	0
10	North Korea	37	38	37	6
15	Thailand	37	33	35	37	5
18	Hong Kong	30	37	30	37	3

1/8 eliminations
3	China	37	37	37	5
14	Myanmar	32	36	37	1
11	Malaysia	36	34	38	32	2
6	Vietnam	36	40	38	38	6
7	Indonesia	34	38	37	36	3
10	North Korea	33	39	38	36	5
15	Thailand	40	33	39	31	17	4
2	Chinese Taipei	38	38	36	39	18	5

Quarterfinals
3	China	37	35	37	6
6	Vietnam	35	33	32	0
10	North Korea	34	38	38	33	17^{*}	5
2	Chinese Taipei	37	35	36	35	17	4

Semifinals
3	China	34	34	39	32	2
10	North Korea	35	38	37	34	6
