= Tomomi Sugimoto =

Japanese archer (born 1994)

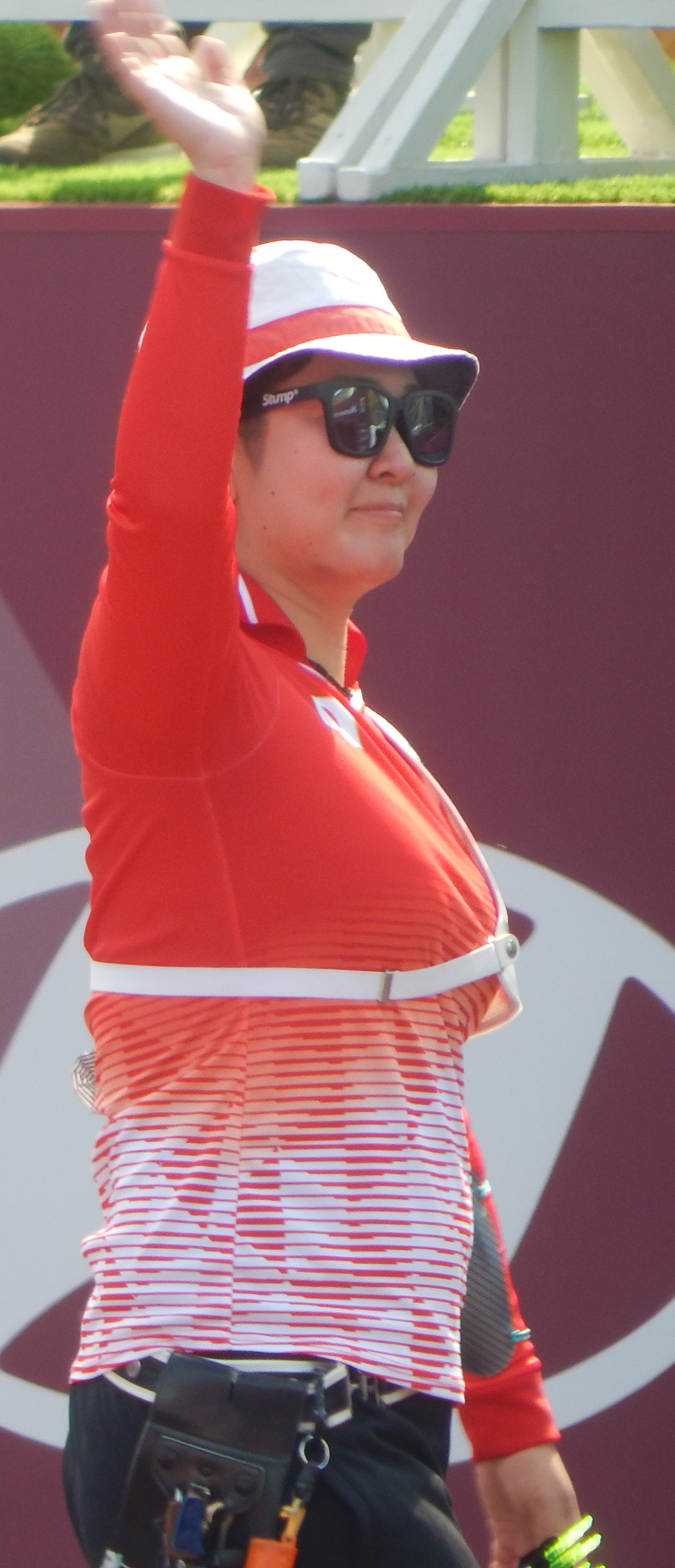
- Tomomi Sugimoto in 2019

Personal information
- Born: 9 November 1994 (age 31)

Sport
- Country: Japan
- Sport: Archery
- Event: Recurve
Medal record
Women's recurve archery
Representing Japan
World Championships
Silver medal – second place	2025 Gwangju	Team
Asian Games
Gold medal – first place	2018 Jakarta	Mixed team
Bronze medal – third place	2018 Jakarta	Team
Asian Championships
Bronze medal – third place	2023 Bangkok	Mixed team

Tomomi Sugimoto (杉本智美, Sugimoto Tomomi; born 9 November 1994) is a Japanese archer competing in women's recurve events. At the 2018 Asian Games in Jakarta, Indonesia, she won the gold medal in the mixed team recurve event and the bronze medal in the women's team recurve event.

At the 2019 Archery World Cup she won the bronze medal in the women's recurve event in Medellín, Colombia and the silver medal in that event at the competition held in Shanghai, China.

In 2021, she competed at the 2021 World Archery Championships held in Yankton, United States.
