= Japan at the 2018 Asian Games =

- IOC code: JPN
- NOC: Japanese Olympic Committee
- Website: www.joc.or.jp

in Jakarta and Palembang August 18 – September 2
- Competitors: 762
- Flag bearers: Yukiko Ueno (Opening); Rikako Ikee (Closing)
- Medals Ranked 2nd: Gold 75 Silver 56 Bronze 74 Total 205

Asian Games appearances (overview)
- 1951; 1954; 1958; 1962; 1966; 1970; 1974; 1978; 1982; 1986; 1990; 1994; 1998; 2002; 2006; 2010; 2014; 2018; 2022; 2026

Japan participated in the 2018 Asian Games as a competing nation, in Jakarta and Palembang, Indonesia, from 18 August to 2 September 2018.

== Medalists ==
The following Japan competitors won medals at the Games.

Medal	Name	Sport	Event	Date
Gold	Satomi Suzuki	Swimming	Women's 100 m breaststroke	19 August
Gold	Daiya Seto	Swimming	Men's 200 m butterfly	19 August
Gold	Rikako Ikee; Natsumi Sakai; Tomomi Aoki; Chihiro Igarashi; Mayuka Yamamoto; Rio Shirai	Swimming	Women's 4 × 100 m freestyle relay	19 August
Gold	Masanao Takahashi; Shunsuke Terui; Kazuki Sado; Akane Kuroki	Equestrian	Team dressage	20 August
Gold	Naito Ehara; Reo Sakata; Kosuke Hagino; Katsuhiro Matsumoto; Juran Mizohata; Ayatsugu Hirai; Yuki Kobori	Swimming	Men's 4 × 200 m freestyle relay	20 August
Gold	Rikako Ikee	Swimming	Women's 50 m butterfly	20 August
Gold	Rikako Ikee	Swimming	Women's 100 m freestyle	20 August
Gold	Kanako Watanabe	Swimming	Women's 200 m breaststroke	20 August
Gold	Yui Ohashi	Swimming	Women's 400 m individual medley	21 August
Gold	Yasuhiro Koseki	Swimming	Men's 200 m breaststroke	21 August
Gold	Rikako Ikee	Swimming	Women's 100 m butterfly	21 August
Gold	Shinobu Ota	Wrestling	Men's Greco-Roman 60 kg	21 August
Gold	Takuya Haneda	Canoeing	Men's slalom C-1	22 August
Gold	Aki Yazawa	Canoeing	Women's slalom K-1	22 August
Gold	Akane Yamaguchi; Arisa Higashino; Aya Ohori; Ayaka Takahashi; Koharu Yonemoto; Misaki Matsutomo; Nozomi Okuhara; Sayaka Hirota; Sayaka Sato; Yuki Fukushima	Badminton	Women's team	22 August
Gold	Yasuhiro Koseki	Swimming	Men's 100 m breaststroke	22 August
Gold	Koki Kano; Kazuyasu Minobe; Satoru Uyama; Masaru Yamada	Fencing	Men's team épée	22 August
Gold	Daiya Seto	Swimming	Men's 400 m individual medley	22 August
Gold	Natsumi Sakai	Swimming	Women's 100 m backstroke	22 August
Gold	Katsuhiro Matsumoto; Juran Mizohata; Katsumi Nakamura; Shinri Shioura	Swimming	Men's 4 × 100 m freestyle relay	22 August
Gold	Shusaku Asato; Tomoyuki Sasaki; Shogo Wada	Bowling	Men's trios	23 August
Gold	Sera Azuma; Karin Miyawaki; Komaki Kikuchi; Sumire Tsuji	Fencing	Women's team foil	23 August
Gold	Satomi Suzuki	Swimming	Women's 50 m breaststroke	23 August
Gold	Shinri Shioura	Swimming	Men's 100 m freestyle	23 August
Gold	Natsumi Sakai; Satomi Suzuki; Rikako Ikee; Tomomi Aoki; Anna Konishi; Reona Aoki; Ai Soma; Sakiko Shimizu	Swimming	Women's 4 × 100 m medley relay	23 August
Gold	Masayuki Miyaura; Masahiro Takeda	Rowing	Men's lightweight double sculls	24 August
Gold	Yukiko Ueno; Yukari Hamamura; Yamato Fujita; Haruka Agatsuma; Saori Yamauchi; Mana Atsumi; Kyoko Ishikawa; Yuka Ichiguchi; Hitomi Kawabata; Natsuko Sugama; Minori Naito; Yu Yamamoto; Misato Kawano; Nozomi Nagasaki; Nodoka Harada; Saki Yamazaki; Eri Yamada	Softball	Women's team	24 August
Gold	Rikako Ikee	Swimming	Women's 50 m freestyle	24 August
Gold	Yasuhiro Koseki	Swimming	Men's 50 m breaststroke	24 August
Gold	Hiroto Inoue	Athletics	Men's marathon	25 August
Gold	Yoshitaku Nagasako	Cycling	Men's BMX race	25 August
Gold	Kiyou Shimizu	Karate	Women's individual kata	25 August
Gold	Ryo Kiyuna	Karate	Men's individual kata	25 August
Gold	Ayumi Uekusa	Karate	Women's kumite +68 kg	25 August
Gold	Keita Nakajima	Golf	Men's individual	26 August
Gold	Keita Nakajima; Ren Yonezawa; Daiki Imano; Takumi Kanaya	Golf	Men's team	26 August
Gold	Akiyo Noguchi	Sport climbing	Women's combined	26 August
Gold	Yoshiaki Oiwa	Equestrian	Individual eventing	26 August
Gold	Takayuki Yumira; Kenta Hiranaga; Ryuzo Kitajima; Yoshiaki Oiwa	Equestrian	Team eventing	26 August
Gold	Keisuke Ushiro	Athletics	Men's decathlon	26 August
Gold	Takaharu Furukawa; Tomomi Sugimoto	Archery	Mixed team recurve	27 August
Gold	Mirai Ishimoto	Bowling	Women's masters	27 August
Gold	Ryutaro Araga	Karate	Men's kumite 84 kg	27 August
Gold	Noa Takahashi	Soft tennis	Women's singles	29 August
Gold	Sakura Yosozumi	Roller sports	Women's park	29 August
Gold	Yoshiaki Hirokawa; Takuo Iwasaki; Taro Kamiyama; Yoshiki Kuremoto; Yoshiaki Nakagawa	Paragliding	Men's team cross-country	29 August
Gold	Kensuke Sasaoka	Roller sports	Men's park	29 August
Gold	Keyaki Ike	Roller sports	Men's street	29 August
Gold	Natsumi Tsunoda	Judo	Women's 52 kg	29 August
Gold	Yumi Kajihara	Cycling	Women's omnium	29 August
Gold	Seito Yamamoto	Athletics	Men's pole vault	29 August
Gold	Yuki Koike	Athletics	Men's 200 m	29 August
Gold	Hayato Katsuki	Athletics	Men's 50 km walk	30 August
Gold	Momo Tamaoki	Judo	Women's 57 kg	30 August
Gold	Shohei Ono	Judo	Men's 73 kg	30 August
Gold	Nami Nabekura	Judo	Women's 63 kg	30 August
Gold	Saki Niizoe	Judo	Women's 70 kg	30 August
Gold	Eiya Hashimoto	Cycling	Men's omnium	30 August
Gold	Ryota Yamagata; Shuhei Tada; Yoshihide Kiryū; Asuka Cambridge	Athletics	Men's 4 × 100 m relay	30 August
Gold	Yuko Takahashi	Triathlon	Women's individual	31 August
Gold	Tetsuya Isozaki; Akira Takayanagi	Sailing	Men's 470	31 August
Gold	Shingen Furuya; Shinji Hachiyama	Sailing	Men's 49er	31 August
Gold	Ai Yoshida; Miho Yoshioka	Sailing	Women's 470	31 August
Gold	Manami Doi	Sailing	Women's laser radial	31 August
Gold	Ruika Sato	Judo	Women's 78 kg	31 August
Gold	Kentaro Iida	Judo	Men's 100 kg	31 August
Gold	Akira Sone	Judo	Women's +78 kg	31 August
Gold	Sakiko Ikeda; Risa Shimizu; Aya Sameshima; Shiori Miyake; Hikari Takagi; Saori Ariyoshi; Emi Nakajima; Mana Iwabuchi; Yuika Sugasawa; Yuka Momiki; Mina Tanaka; Rika Masuya; Yu Nakasato; Yui Hasegawa; Moeno Sakaguchi; Rin Sumida; Aimi Kunitake; Ayaka Yamashita	Football	Women's tournament	31 August
Gold	Megumi Kageyama; Natsuki Naito; Akiko Ota; Emi Nishikori; Shihori Oikawa; Kimika Hoshi; Mayumi Ono; Yukari Mano; Akiko Kato; Hazuki Nagai; Minami Shimizu; Yuri Nagai; Aki Yamada; Maho Segawa; Yui Ishibashi; Mami Karino; Motomi Kawamura; Akio Tanaka	Field hockey	Women's tournament	31 August
Gold	Jumpei Furuya	Triathlon	Men's individual	1 September
Gold	Misaki Hangai; Riko Hayashida; Rurika Kuroki; Kurumi Onoue; Noa Takahashi	Soft tennis	Women's team	1 September
Gold	Masashi Ebinuma; Shohei Ono; Mashu Baker; Yusuke Kobayashi; Kokoro Kageura; Takeshi Ojitani; Haruka Funakubo; Momo Tamaoki; Saki Niizoe; Shiho Tanaka; Akira Sone; Sara Yamamoto	Judo	Mixed team	1 September
Gold	Koji Yamasaki; Genki Mitani; Seren Tanaka; Hiromasa Ochiai; Kazuma Murata; Suguru Hoshi; Kenta Tanaka; Kenji Kitazato; Manabu Yamashita; Kaito Tanaka; Kentaro Fukuda; Masaki Ohashi; Shota Yamada; Yusuke Takano; Hirotaka Zendana; Takashi Yoshikawa; Kota Watanabe; Yoshiki Kirishita	Field hockey	Men's tournament	1 September
Gold	Chiharu Nakamura; Noriko Taniguchi; Raichel Bativakalolo; Yume Okuroda; Fumiko Otake; Riho Kurogi; Tomomi Kozasa; Iroha Nagata; Yukari Tateyama; Yume Hirano; Ano Kuwai; Emii Tanaka	Rugby sevens	Women's tournament	1 September
Gold	Yuka Sato; Jumpei Furuya; Yuko Takahashi; Yuichi Hosoda	Triathlon	Mixed relay	2 September
Silver	Katsuhiro Matsumoto	Swimming	Men's 200 m freestyle	19 August
Silver	Natsumi Sakai	Swimming	Women's 200 m backstroke	19 August
Silver	Ryosuke Irie	Swimming	Men's 100 m backstroke	19 August
Silver	Reona Aoki	Swimming	Women's 100 m breaststroke	19 August
Silver	Nao Horomura	Swimming	Men's 200 m butterfly	19 August
Silver	Daichi Takatani	Wrestling	Men's freestyle 65 kg	19 August
Silver	Shogo Nonomura	Gymnastics	Men's artistic individual all-around	20 August
Silver	Shogo Takeda	Swimming	Men's 800 m freestyle	20 August
Silver	Ryosuke Irie	Swimming	Men's 50 m backstroke	20 August
Silver	Kosuke Hagino	Swimming	Men's 200 m individual medley	20 August
Silver	Yuki Irie	Wrestling	Women's freestyle 50 kg	20 August
Silver	Tomoyuki Matsuda	Shooting	Men's 10 m air pistol	21 August
Silver	Katsumi Nakamura	Swimming	Men's 50 m freestyle	21 August
Silver	Ippei Watanabe	Swimming	Men's 200 m breaststroke	21 August
Silver	Naito Ehara	Swimming	Men's 400 m freestyle	21 August
Silver	Hiroe Minagawa	Wrestling	Women's freestyle 76 kg	21 August
Silver	Tomomi Aoki; Chihiro Igarashi; Rikako Ikee; Rio Shirai	Swimming	Women's 4 × 200 m freestyle relay	21 August
Silver	Tomohiro Araya	Wushu	Men's taijiquan and taijijian	22 August
Silver	Kenta Chiba; Tomomasa Hasegawa; Fuya Maeno; Shogo Nonomura; Kakeru Tanigawa	Gymnastics	Men's artistic team all-around	22 August
Silver	Sachi Mochida	Swimming	Women's 200 m butterfly	22 August
Silver	Kosuke Hagino	Swimming	Men's 400 m individual medley	22 August
Silver	Anna Konishi	Swimming	Men's 100 m backstroke	22 August
Silver	Ryosuke Irie; Yasuhiro Koseki; Rikako Ikee; Tomomi Aoki	Swimming	Mixed 4 × 100 m medley relay	22 August
Silver	Fumiyuki Beppu	Cycling	Men's road race	23 August
Silver	Kazuya Adachi	Canoeing	Men's slalom K-1	23 August
Silver	Katsumi Nakamura	Swimming	Men's 100 m freestyle	23 August
Silver	Shogo Nonomura	Gymnastics	Men's rings	23 August
Silver	Ryosuke Irie	Swimming	Men's 200 m backstroke	23 August
Silver	Eri Yonamine	Cycling	Women's road time trial	24 August
Silver	Ryosuke Irie; Yasuhiro Koseki; Yuki Kobori; Shinri Shioura; Masaki Kaneko; Ippei Watanabe; Nao Horomura; Katsumi Nakamura	Swimming	Men's 4 × 100 m medley relay	24 August
Silver	Yui Ohashi	Swimming	Women's 200 m individual medley	24 August
Silver	Keiko Nogami	Athletics	Women's marathon	26 August
Silver	Kokoro Fujii	Sport climbing	Men's combined	26 August
Silver	Kiho Miyashita; Norika Konno; Ririka Okuyama; Stephanie Mawuli	Basketball	Women's 3-on-3	26 August
Silver	Miki Ishii; Megumi Murakami	Volleyball	Women's beach	27 August
Silver	Misaki Matsutomo; Ayaka Takahashi	Badminton	Women's doubles	27 August
Silver	Yukiko Inui; Megumu Yoshida	Artistic swimming	Women's duet	28 August
Silver	Taizo Sugitani; Shota Ogomori; Daisuke Fukushima; Toshiki Masui	Equestrian	Team jumping	28 August
Silver	Ryo Chikatani	Cycling	Men's individual pursuit	29 August
Silver	Toshikazu Yamanishi	Athletics	Men's 20 km walk	29 August
Silver	Kaya Isa	Roller sports	Women's park	29 August
Silver	Keiko Hiraki; Nao Mochizuki; Atsuko Yamashita	Paragliding	Women's team cross-country	29 August
Silver	Kaya Isa	Roller sports	Women's street	29 August
Silver	Juka Fukumura; Yukiko Inui; Moeka Kijima; Okina Kyogoku; Kei Marumo; Kano Omata; Mayu Tsukamoto; Mashiro Yasunaga; Megumu Yoshida	Artistic swimming	Women's team	29 August
Silver	Ami Kondo	Judo	Women's 48 kg	29 August
Silver	Toru Shishime	Judo	Men's 60 kg	29 August
Silver	Joshiro Maruyama	Judo	Men's 66 kg	29 August
Silver	Hikaru Mori	Gymnastics	Women's trampoline	30 August
Silver	Tomohiro Fukaya	Cycling	Men's sprint	30 August
Silver	Yudai Nitta	Cycling	Men's keirin	31 August
Silver	Yuki Sato; Seiya Takano; Takeshi Terashima; Toshitaka Naito; Hirokazu Kobayashi; Masanori Hayashi	Sepak takraw	Men's quadrant	1 September
Silver	Hayato Funemizu; Taimei Marunaka; Kento Masuda; Koichi Nagae; Toshiki Uematsu	Soft tennis	Men's team	1 September
Silver	Koji Chikamoto; Jumpei Horimai; Sho Aoyagi; Shoji Kitamura; Momotaro Matsumoto; Asahi Sato; Tsuyoshi Tamura; Michiori Okabe; Shohei Morishita; Junya Kino; Yuichiro Okano; Yuki Jibiki; Yudai Aranishi; Isamu Usui; Makoto Hori; Takumi Takahashi; Katsutoshi Satake; Akiyoshi Katsuno; Takehiro Tsujino; Kohei Sasagawa; Ryo Kinami; Ryoga Tomiyama; Takeshi Hosoyamada	Baseball	Men's tournament	1 September
Silver	Katsuyuki Tanamura; Seiya Adachi; Harukiirario Koppu; Mitsuaki Shiga; Takuma Yoshida; Atsuto Iida; Takumu Miyazawa; Mitsuru Takata; Atsushi Arai; Yusuke Inaba; Keigo Okawa; Kenta Araki; Tomoyoshi Fukushima	Water polo	Men's tournament	1 September
Silver	Ryosuke Kojima; Yoichi Naganuma; Makoto Okazaki; Ko Itakura; Daiki Sugioka; Ryo Hatsuse; Teruki Hara; Kaoru Mitoma; Reo Hatate; Koji Miyoshi; Keita Endo; Powell Obinna Obi; Yuto Iwasaki; Taishi Matsumoto; Ayase Ueda; Kota Watanabe; Yuta Kamiya; Daizen Maeda; Takuma Ominami; Yugo Tatsuta	Football	Men's tournament	1 September
Silver	Lote Tuqiri; Tevita Tupou; Taisei Hayashi; Rikiya Oishi; Kameli Soejima; Dai Ozawa; Katsuyuki Sakai; Keisuke Shin; Ryota Kano; Kosuke Hashino; Chihito Matsui; Naoki Motomura	Rugby sevens	Men's tournament	1 September
Bronze	Waka Kobori	Swimming	Women's 1500 m freestyle	19 August
Bronze	Norika Tamura	Fencing	Women's individual sabre	19 August
Bronze	Koki Kano	Fencing	Men's individual épée	19 August
Bronze	Yuki Takahashi	Wrestling	Men's freestyle 57 kg	19 August
Bronze	Yuhi Fujinami	Wrestling	Men's freestyle 74 kg	19 August
Bronze	Sergio Suzuki	Taekwondo	Men's 58 kg	20 August
Bronze	Sera Azuma	Fencing	Women's individual foil	20 August
Bronze	Reona Aoki	Swimming	Women's 200 m breaststroke	20 August
Bronze	Haruna Okuno	Wrestling	Women's freestyle 53 kg	20 August
Bronze	Katsuki Sakagami	Wrestling	Women's freestyle 57 kg	20 August
Bronze	Risako Kawai	Wrestling	Women's freestyle 62 kg	20 August
Bronze	Takayuki Matsumoto	Shooting	Men's 50 m rifle three positions	21 August
Bronze	Minami Shioya; Yumi Arima; Akari Inaba; Shino Magariyama; Chiaki Sakanoue; Minori Yamamoto; Maiko Hashida; Yuki Niizawa; Kana Hosoya; Misaki Noro; Marina Tokumoto; Kotori Suzuki; Miyuu Aoki	Water polo	Women's tournament	21 August
Bronze	Kento Momota; Kenta Nishimoto; Kazumasa Sakai; Kanta Tsuneyama; Takeshi Kamura; Keigo Sonoda; Takuto Inoue; Yuki Kaneko; Yuta Watanabe; Takuro Hoki	Badminton	Men's team	21 August
Bronze	Natsumi Sakai	Swimming	Women's 50 m backstroke	21 August
Bronze	Shunichi Nakao	Swimming	Men's 50 m freestyle	21 August
Bronze	Sakiko Shimizu	Swimming	Women's 400 m individual medley	21 August
Bronze	Kosuke Hagino	Swimming	Men's 400 m freestyle	21 August
Bronze	Eri Yonamine	Cycling	Women's road race	22 August
Bronze	Chika Aoki; Shihomi Fukushima; Risa Takashima; Norika Tamura	Fencing	Women's team sabre	22 August
Bronze	Soyoka Hanawa; Shiho Nakaji; Yumika Nakamura; Yuki Uchiyama; Yurika Yumoto	Gymnastics	Women's artistic team all-around	22 August
Bronze	Yuki Kobori	Swimming	Men's 100 m butterfly	22 August
Bronze	Chihiro Igarashi	Swimming	Women's 200 m freestyle	22 August
Bronze	Suzuka Hasegawa	Swimming	Women's 200 m butterfly	22 August
Bronze	Arata Sonoda	Wrestling	Men's Greco-Roman 130 kg	22 August
Bronze	Ryuta Arakawa	Rowing	Men's single sculls	23 August
Bronze	Yoshihiro Otsuka; Yuta Takano	Rowing	Men's coxless pair	23 August
Bronze	Sho Shimabukuro; Kaito Uesugi	Tennis	Men's doubles	23 August
Bronze	Yuya Ito; Yosuke Watanuki	Tennis	Men's doubles	23 August
Bronze	Mikiko Ando	Weightlifting	Women's 58 kg	23 August
Bronze	Miyu Yamada	Taekwondo	Women's 49 kg	23 August
Bronze	Yuki Kobori	Swimming	Women's 800 m freestyle	23 August
Bronze	Keita Sunama	Swimming	Men's 200 m backstroke	23 August
Bronze	Miyu Kato; Makoto Ninomiya	Tennis	Women's doubles	24 August
Bronze	Erina Hayashi; Kaito Uesugi	Tennis	Mixed doubles	24 August
Bronze	Haruna Baba; Shiori Komata; Kanna Oishi; Ayumi Yamada	Fencing	Women's team épée	24 August
Bronze	Fumiyuki Beppu	Cycling	Men's road time trial	24 August
Bronze	Kyosuke Matsuyama; Toshiya Saito; Takahiro Shikine; Kenta Suzumura	Fencing	Men's team foil	24 August
Bronze	Yuki Sato; Seiya Takano; Takeshi Terashima; Toshitaka Naito; Ryo Masuda; Tsubasa Sato; Masahiro Yamada; Hirokazu Kobayashi; Masanori Hayashi	Sepak takraw	Men's team doubles	24 August
Bronze	Kenta Chiba	Gymnastics	Men's parallel bars	24 August
Bronze	Shiho Nakaji	Gymnastics	Women's floor	24 August
Bronze	Chihiro Igarashi	Swimming	Women's 400 m freestyle	24 August
Bronze	Miho Teramura	Swimming	Women's 200 m individual medley	24 August
Bronze	Hitomi Katsuyama	Athletics	Women's hammer throw	25 August
Bronze	Tomoa Narasaki	Sport climbing	Men's combined	26 August
Bronze	Yuki Fukushima; Sayaka Hirota	Badminton	Women's doubles	26 August
Bronze	Akihiko Nakamura	Athletics	Men's decathlon	26 August
Bronze	Ryota Yamagata	Athletics	Men's 100 m	26 August
Bronze	Ayano Kato; Kaori Kawanaka; Tomomi Sugimoto	Archery	Women's team recurve	27 August
Bronze	Kayo Someya	Karate	Women's kumite 68 kg	27 August
Bronze	Akane Yamaguchi	Badminton	Women's singles	27 August
Bronze	Kenta Nishimoto	Badminton	Men's singles	27 August
Bronze	Kazuki Amagai; Yudai Nitta; Tomohiro Fukaya	Cycling	Men's team sprint	27 August
Bronze	Miho Miyahara	Karate	Women's kumite 50 kg	27 August
Bronze	Naoto Tobe	Athletics	Men's high jump	27 August
Bronze	Takatoshi Abe	Athletics	Men's 400 m hurdles	27 August
Bronze	Kazuya Shiojiri	Athletics	Men's 3000 m steeplechase	27 August
Bronze	Yumi Kajihara; Kisato Nakamura; Miho Yoshikawa; Yuya Hashimoto; Nao Suzuki	Cycling	Women's team pursuit	28 August
Bronze	Shogo Ichimaru; Shunsuke Imamura; Ryo Chikatani; Eiya Hashimoto; Keitaro Sawada	Cycling	Men's team pursuit	28 August
Bronze	Shunya Takayama	Athletics	Men's 110 m hurdles	28 August
Bronze	Ken Terauchi; Sho Sakai	Diving	Men's synchronized 3 m springboard	28 August
Bronze	Kumiko Okada	Athletics	Women's 20 km walk	29 August
Bronze	Yuki Yamasaki	Athletics	Women's heptathlon	29 August
Bronze	Toshiki Uematsu; Riko Hayashida	Soft tennis	Mixed doubles	30 August
Bronze	Kimiko Hida; Mika Nagata; Kaho Sunami; Sayo Shiota; Asuka Fujita; Aya Yokoshima; Minami Itano; Chie Katsuren; Hitomi Tada; Natsumi Akiyama; Nozomi Hara; Mana Ohyama; Shiori Nagata; Miyuki Terada; Tomomi Kawata; Mayuko Ishitate	Handball	Women's tournament	30 August
Bronze	Julian Walsh; Yuki Koike; Takatoshi Abe; Shōta Iizuka; Jun Kimura; Sho Kawamoto	Athletics	Men's 4 × 400 m relay	30 August
Bronze	Satomi Watanabe; Misaki Kobayashi; Risa Sugimoto	Squash	Women's team	31 August
Bronze	Eiya Hashimoto; Shunsuke Imamura	Cycling	Men's madison	31 August
Bronze	Mashu Baker	Judo	Men's 90 kg	31 August
Bronze	Daisuke Narimatsu	Boxing	Men's 64 kg	31 August
Bronze	Yuka Ono	Canoeing	Women's K-1 200 m	1 September
Bronze	Yuka Ono; Hideka Tatara	Canoeing	Women's K-2 500 m	1 September
Bronze	Layla Takehara; Stephanie Mawuli; Haruka Suzuki; Mio Shinozaki; Shiori Yasuma; Miyuki Kawamura; Moe Nagata; Saki Hayashi; Saori Miyazaki; Tamami Nakada; Aya Watanabe; Juna Umezawa	Basketball	Women's tournament	1 September
Bronze	Natsuki Tomi	Sambo	Women's 68 kg	1 September

By sport events

Medals by sport
Sport	1st place, gold medalist(s)	2nd place, silver medalist(s)	3rd place, bronze medalist(s)	Total
Archery	1	0	1	2
Artistic swimming	0	2	0	2
Athletics	6	2	10	18
Badminton	1	1	4	6
Baseball	0	1	0	1
Basketball	0	1	1	2
Bowling	2	0	0	2
Boxing	0	0	1	1
Canoeing	2	1	2	5
Cycling	3	5	6	14
Diving	0	0	1	1
Equestrian	3	1	0	4
Fencing	2	0	6	8
Field hockey	2	0	0	2
Football	1	1	0	2
Golf	2	0	0	2
Gymnastics	0	4	3	7
Handball	0	0	1	1
Judo	9	3	1	13
Karate	4	0	2	6
Paragliding	1	1	0	2
Roller sports	3	2	0	5
Rowing	1	0	2	3
Rugby sevens	1	1	0	2
Sailing	4	0	0	4
Sambo	0	0	1	1
Sepak takraw	0	1	1	2
Shooting	0	1	1	2
Soft tennis	2	1	1	4
Softball	1	0	0	1
Sport climbing	1	1	1	3
Squash	0	0	1	1
Swimming	19	20	13	52
Taekwondo	0	0	2	2
Tennis	0	0	4	4
Triathlon	3	0	0	3
Volleyball	0	1	0	1
Water polo	0	1	1	2
Weightlifting	0	0	1	1
Wrestling	1	3	6	10
Wushu	0	1	0	1
Total	75	56	74	205

Timeline

Medals by day
Day	Date	1st place, gold medalist(s)	2nd place, silver medalist(s)	3rd place, bronze medalist(s)	Total
1	August 19	3	6	5	14
2	August 20	5	5	6	16
3	August 21	4	6	7	17
4	August 22	8	6	7	21
5	August 23	5	5	8	18
6	August 24	4	3	10	17
7	August 25	5	0	1	6
8	August 26	6	3	4	13
9	August 27	3	2	9	14
10	August 28	0	2	4	6
11	August 29	9	9	2	20
12	August 30	7	2	3	12
13	August 31	10	1	4	15
14	September 1	5	6	4	15
15	September 2	1	0	0	1
Total		75	56	74	205

Demonstration events

Medal	Name	Sport	Event	Date
Gold	Naoki Sugimura; Tsubasa Aihara	eSports	Pro Evolution Soccer tournament	1 September

== Competitors ==
The number of competitors representing Japan in each sport at the Games was:

Sport	Men	Women	Total
Archery	4	4	8
Artistic swimming	—	9	9
Athletics	35	23	58
Badminton	10	10	20
Baseball	23	—	23
Basketball	16	16	32
Bowling	6	6	12
Boxing	7	1	8
Canoeing	11	8	19
Contract bridge	9	3	12
Cycling	14	10	24
Diving	3	4	7
Equestrian	11	1	12
Fencing	12	12	24
Field hockey	18	18	36
Football	20	18	38
Golf	4	3	7
Gymnastics	7	11	18
Handball	15	16	31
Judo	10	10	20
Kabaddi	10	10	20
Karate	4	4	8
Kurash	2	0	2
Modern pentathlon	2	2	4
Paragliding	5	3	8
Pencak silat	1	0	1
Roller sports	2	2	4
Rowing	7	7	14
Rugby sevens	12	12	24
Sailing	7	5	12
Sambo	2	1	3
Sepak takraw	9	9	18
Shooting	9	9	18
Soft tennis	5	5	10
Softball	—	17	17
Sport climbing	2	2	4
Squash	3	3	6
Swimming	19	19	38
Table tennis	4	4	8
Taekwondo	3	3	6
Tennis	5	5	10
Triathlon	3	2	5
Volleyball	18	18	36
Water polo	13	13	26
Weightlifting	8	7	15
Wrestling	12	6	18
Wushu	4	2	6
Total	406	353	759

=== Demonstration events ===
Sport	Men	Women	Total
Canoe polo	6	6	12
eSports	3	0	3

== Archery ==
Recurve

Athlete	Event	Ranking round		Round of 64	Round of 32	Round of 16	Quarterfinals	Semifinals	Final / BM	
Athlete	Event	Score	Seed	Opposition score	Opposition score	Opposition score	Opposition score	Opposition score	Opposition score	Rank
Hiroki Muto	Men's individual	649	18	Khudoyarov (TJK); W 6–0	Baatarkhuyag (MGL); W 6–4	Kim (KOR); L 1–7	Did not advance			
Takaharu Furukawa	Men's individual	668	7	Bye	Pathairat (THA); W 6–2	Li (CHN); W 6–4	Kim (KOR); L 4–6	Did not advance		
Tomoaki Kuraya	Men's individual	646	30	Did not advance						
Hiroki Muto; Takaharu Furukawa; Tomoaki Kuraya	Men's team	1963	6	—N/a	Bye	Indonesia; W 6–2	Chinese Taipei; L 0–6	Did not advance		
Ayano Kato	Women's individual	643	19	Did not advance						
Kaori Kawanaka	Women's individual	649	13	Bye	Ghapar (MAS); W 6–0	Tan (TPE); L 1–7	Did not advance			
Tomomi Sugimoto	Women's individual	663	6	Bye	Tagaeva (TJK); W 6–0	Lestari (INA); W 6–2	Le (TPE); L 0–6	Did not advance		
Ayano Kato; Kaori Kawanaka; Tomomi Sugimoto	Women's team	1955	4	—N/a		Bangladesh; W 6–2	Indonesia; W 6–0	South Korea; L 2–6	China; W 6–2	3rd place, bronze medalist(s)
Takaharu Furukawa; Tomomi Sugimoto	Mixed team	1331	4	—N/a	Bye	Iran; W 6–0	Bangladesh; W 5–1	Mongolia; W 6–2	North Korea; W 6–0	1st place, gold medalist(s)

Compound

Athlete	Event	Ranking round		Round of 32	Round of 16	Quarterfinals	Semifinals	Final / BM	
Athlete	Event	Score	Seed	Opposition score	Opposition score	Opposition score	Opposition score	Opposition score	Rank
Kazune Nakamura; Yumiko Honda	Mixed team	1366	10	Bye	Iran; L 152–152^{(17–19)}	Did not advance			

== Artistic swimming ==
Japan has fielded a squad of nine artistic swimmers to compete in the women's duet and team events.

Athlete	Event	Technical routine		Free routine		Total	Rank
Athlete	Event	Points	Rank	Points	Rank	Total	Rank
Yukiko Inui; Megumu Yoshida	Duet	90.2363	2	92.1000	2	182.3363	2nd place, silver medalist(s)
Juka Fukumura; Yukiko Inui; Kei Marumo; Kano Omata; Mayu Tsukamoto; Mashiro Yasunaga; Megumu Yoshida; Moeka Kijima^{FR} Okina Kyogoku^{TR}	Team	90.9357	2	91.9333	2	182.8690	2nd place, silver medalist(s)

FR: Reserved in free routine; TR: Reserved in technical routine.

== Athletics ==
Men
Track & road events

Athlete	Event	Heat		Semifinal		Final	
Athlete	Event	Result	Rank	Result	Rank	Result	Rank
Ryota Yamagata	100 m	10.19	2Q	10.10	1Q	10.00	3rd place, bronze medalist(s)
Asuka Cambridge	100 m	10.23	2Q	10.36	3	Did not advance	
Shōta Iizuka	200 m	21.08	2Q	20.64	2Q	20.68	7
Yuki Koike	200 m	21.30	2Q	20.35	1Q	20.23	1st place, gold medalist(s)
Julian Walsh	400 m	46.20	2Q	46.01	2	45.89	5
Sho Kawamoto	800 m	1:48.07	4Q	—N/a		1:50.87	7
Takumi Murashima	800 m	1:48.86	3	—N/a		Did not advance	
Ryoji Tatezawa	1500 m	3:50.75	4Q	—N/a		3:49.40	9
Taioh Kanai	110 m hurdles	13.81	2Q	—N/a		13.74	7
Shunya Takayama	110 m hurdles	13.84	1Q	—N/a		13.48	3rd place, bronze medalist(s)
Takatoshi Abe	400 m hurdles	49.71	3Q	—N/a		49.12	3rd place, bronze medalist(s)
Takayuki Kishimoto	400 m hurdles	50.95	10	—N/a		Did not advance	
Kazuya Shiojiri	3000 m steeplechase	—N/a				8:29.42	3rd place, bronze medalist(s)
Kosei Yamaguchi	3000 m steeplechase	—N/a				8:47.41	9
Hiroto Inoue	Marathon	—N/a				2:18:22	1st place, gold medalist(s)
Hayato Sonoda	Marathon	—N/a				2:19:04	4
Eiki Takahashi	20 km walk	—N/a				1:27:31	5
Toshikazu Yamanishi	20 km walk	—N/a				1:22:10	2nd place, silver medalist(s)
Hayato Katsuki	50 km walk	—N/a				4:03:30	1st place, gold medalist(s)
Satoshi Maruo	50 km walk	—N/a				4:14:13	4
Ryota Yamagata; Shuhei Tada; Yoshihide Kiryū; Asuka Cambridge	4 × 100 m relay	38.20	1	—N/a		38.16	1st place, gold medalist(s)
Julian Walsh; Yuki Koike; Takatoshi Abe; Shōta Iizuka	4 × 400 m relay	3:06.11	1	—N/a		3:01.94	3rd place, bronze medalist(s)

Field events

Athlete	Event	Heat		Final	
Athlete	Event	Result	Rank	Result	Rank
Yuki Hashioka	Long jump	8.03	1Q	8.05	4
Shotaro Shiroyama	Long jump	7.74	6Q	7.98	5
Kohei Yamashita	Triple jump	—N/a		16.46	4
Naoto Tobe	High jump	2.15	1Q	2.24	3rd place, bronze medalist(s)
Takashi Eto	High jump	2.15	1Q	2.24	6
Seito Yamamoto	Pole vault	—N/a		5.70	1st place, gold medalist(s)
Kosei Takekawa	Pole vault	—N/a		5.00	11
Masateru Yugami	Discus throw	—N/a		57.62	6
Ryohei Arai	Javelin throw	—N/a		75.24	7

Combined events – Decathlon

Athlete	Event	100 m	LJ	SP	HJ	400 m	110H	DT	PV	JT	1500 m	Final	Rank
Akihiko Nakamura	Result	10.95	7.34	11.43	1.97	48.87	14.45	36.84	4.80	51.35	4:24.75	7738	3rd place, bronze medalist(s)
Akihiko Nakamura	Points	872	896	572	776	867	917	601	849	609	779	7738	3rd place, bronze medalist(s)
Keisuke Ushiro	Result	11.39	7.09	14.49	1.97	50.29	15.09	45.09	4.90	63.07	4:44.11	7878	1st place, gold medalist(s)
Keisuke Ushiro	Points	776	835	758	776	801	839	774	880	784	655	7878	1st place, gold medalist(s)

Women
Track & road events

Athlete	Event	Heat		Semifinal		Final	
Athlete	Event	Result	Rank	Result	Rank	Result	Rank
Chisato Fukushima	100 m	11.99	4	Did not advance			
Chisato Fukushima	200 m	DNS		Did not advance			
Kana Ichikawa	100 m	11.94	5Q	12.01	8	Did not advance	
Yume Kitamura	800 m	2:05.31	2Q	—N/a		2:03.88	4
Ayano Shiomi	800 m	2:04.46	2Q	—N/a		2:04.57	4
Rina Nabeshima	5000 m	—N/a				15:40.37	4
Minami Yamanouchi	5000 m	—N/a				15:52.48	6
Yuka Hori	10000 m	—N/a				32:42.73	7
Masumi Aoki	100 m hurdles	13.48	3Q	—N/a		13.63	5
Hitomi Shimura	100 m hurdles	13.87	8Q	—N/a		13.74	7
Eri Utsunomiya	400 m hurdles	57.99	2Q	—N/a		58.97	7
Yukari Ishizawa	3000 m steeplechase	—N/a				10:13.53	8
Keiko Nogami	Marathon	—N/a				2:36:27	2nd place, silver medalist(s)
Hanae Tanaka	Marathon	—N/a				2:42:35	9
Kumiko Okada	20 km walk	—N/a				1:34:02	3rd place, bronze medalist(s)
Midori Mikase; Kana Ichikawa; Nodoka Seko; Masumi Aoki	4 × 100 m relay	44.95	5	—N/a		44.93	5
Ayaka Kawata; Yume Kitamura; Eri Utsunomiya; Ayano Shiomi	4 × 400 m relay	—N/a				3:34.14	5

Field events

Athlete	Event	Final	
Athlete	Event	Result	Rank
Hitomi Katsuyama	Hammer throw	62.95	3rd place, bronze medalist(s)
Akane Watanabe	Hammer throw	62.45	4
Marina Saito	Javelin throw	56.46	4
Risa Miyashita	Javelin throw	51.05	9

Combined events - Heptathlon

Athlete	Event	110H	HJ	SP	200 m	LJ	JT	800 m	Final	Rank
Meg Hemphill	Result	13.69	1.64	11.97	25.37	5.97	43.71	2:25.00	5654	6
Meg Hemphill	Points	1023	783	659	853	840	739	757	5654	6
Yuki Yamasaki	Result	14.02	1.70	12.13	24.75	5.89	46.48	2:17.75	5873	3rd place, bronze medalist(s)
Yuki Yamasaki	Points	976	855	670	910	816	792	854	5873	3rd place, bronze medalist(s)

Mixed

Athlete	Event	Heat		Semifinal		Final	
Athlete	Event	Result	Rank	Result	Rank	Result	Rank
Jun Kimura; Ayaka Kawata; Eri Utsunomiya; Jun Yamashita	4 × 400 m relay	—N/a				3:21.90	5

== Badminton ==
Nippon Badminton Association announced its squad of 20 players (10 men's and 10 women's) on 6 June 2018.

Men

Athlete	Event	Round of 64	Round of 32	Round of 16	Quarterfinals	Semifinals	Final	
Athlete	Event	Opposition score	Opposition score	Opposition score	Opposition score	Opposition score	Opposition score	Rank
Kento Momota	Singles	Bye	B Shrestha (NEP); W (21–9, 21–10)	A S Ginting (INA); L (18–21, 18–21)	Did not advance			
Kenta Nishimoto	Singles	Bye	K Byambajav (MGL); W (21–11, 21–6)	H Z Shaheed (MDV); W (21–7, 21–10)	Son W-h (KOR); W (21–17, 21–11)	J Christie (INA); L (15–21, 21–15, 19–21)	Did not advance	3rd place, bronze medalist(s)
Takeshi Kamura; Keigo Sonoda	Doubles	—N/a	T Isriyanet / K Namdash (THA); W (21–11, 21–16)	Ong Y S / Teo E Y (MAS); L (14–21, 17–21)	Did not advance			
Takuto Inoue; Yuki Kaneko	Doubles	—N/a	M I S Bhatti / A Sarwar (PAK); W (21–8, 21–16)	M F Gideon / K S Sukamuljo (INA); L (16–21, 21–19, 18–21)	Did not advance			
Kento Momota; Kenta Nishimoto; Riichi Takeshita; Kanta Tsuneyama; Takeshi Kamura; Keigo Sonoda; Takuto Inoue; Yuki Kaneko; Yuta Watanabe; Takuro Hoki	Team	—N/a		Malaysia; W 3–0	South Korea; W 3–0	Indonesia; L 1–3	Did not advance	3rd place, bronze medalist(s)

Women

Athlete	Event	Round of 32	Round of 16	Quarterfinals	Semifinals	Final	
Athlete	Event	Opposition score	Opposition score	Opposition score	Opposition score	Opposition score	Rank
Akane Yamaguchi	Singles	S Lidaa (AFG); W (21–0, 21–3)	N Tamang (NEP); W (21–7, 21–12)	Chen YF (CHN); W (21–19, 21–11)	P V Sindhu (IND); L (17–21, 21–15, 10–21)	Did not advance	3rd place, bronze medalist(s)
Nozomi Okuhara	Singles	M A Shahrurunaz (MDV); W (21–2, 21–5)	He BJ (CHN); W (21–10, 21–12)	Tai T-y (TPE); L (15–21, 10–21)	Did not advance		
Misaki Matsutomo; Ayaka Takahashi	Doubles	Bye	G Saddique / S Waqas (PAK); W (21–3, 21–3)	Kim H-r / Kong H-y (KOR); W (21–10, 21–7)	G Polii / A Rahayu (INA); W (21–15, 21–17)	Chen QC / Jia YF (CHN); L (20–22, 20–22)	2nd place, silver medalist(s)
Yuki Fukushima; Sayaka Hirota	Doubles	Bye	D D Haris / R A Pradipta (INA); W (21–13, 21–17)	Lee S-h / Shin S-c (KOR); W (21–13, 21–17)	Chen QC / Jia YF (CHN); L (17–21, 8–21)	Did not advance	3rd place, bronze medalist(s)
Akane Yamaguchi; Nozomi Okuhara; Sayaka Sato; Aya Ohori; Misaki Matsutomo; Ayaka Takahashi; Yuki Fukushima; Sayaka Hirota; Arisa Higashino; Koharu Yonemoto	Team	—N/a	Bye	India; W 3–1	Indonesia; W 3–1	China; W 3–1	1st place, gold medalist(s)

Mixed

Athlete	Event	Round of 32	Round of 16	Quarterfinals	Semifinals	Final	
Athlete	Event	Opposition score	Opposition score	Opposition score	Opposition score	Opposition score	Rank
Yuta Watanabe; Arisa Higashino	Mixed	Choi S-g / Shin S-c (KOR); W (12–21, 22–20, 21–15)	R Azam / S Waqas (PAK); W (21–7, 21–9)	Wang YL / Huang DP (CHN); L (17–21, 21–18, 17–21)	Did not advance		
Takuro Hoki; Koharu Yonemoto	Mixed	Bye	Đỗ T Đ / Phạm N T (VIE); W (21–12, 21–13)	Zheng SW / Huang YQ (CHN); L (13–21, 15–21)	Did not advance		

== Baseball ==
Japan participated in the baseball competition at the Games, and the team were drawn in the group A.

Team	Event	Round 1		Round 2		Super / Consolation		Final / BM	
Team	Event	Oppositions scores	Rank	Oppositions scores	Rank	Oppositions scores	Rank	Opposition score	Rank
Japan men's	Men's tournament	Bye		Pakistan: W 15–0 (F/6); China: W 17–2 (F/5); Thailand: W 24–0 (F/5)	1 Q	South Korea: L 1–5; Chinese Taipei: W 5–0	2 Q	South Korea: L 0–3	2nd place, silver medalist(s)

Roster

The following is the Japan roster (Samurai team) for the men's baseball tournament of the 2018 Asian Games. The team of 24 players was officially named on 18 June 2018. The team remain of 23 players after Shunpei Yoshikawa withdrawal from the Games.

Manager
Akio Ishii

Coaches
Yuji Tanahashi
Shigeki Wakabayashi
Masanori Sugiura

Pos.	No.	Player	Date of birth (age)	Bats	Throws	Club
OF	1	Koji Chikamoto	9 November 1994 (aged 23)			(Japan) Osaka Gas Okayama
IF	2	Jumpei Horimai	18 April 1993 (aged 25)			(Japan) Toshiba Iwate
IF	3	Sho Aoyagi	7 December 1989 (aged 28)			(Japan) Osaka Gas Okayama
IF	4	Shoji Kitamura	23 January 1994 (aged 24)			(Japan) Toyota Ishikawa
OF	5	Momotaro Matsumoto	11 November 1994 (aged 23)			(Japan) Honda Hokkaido
OF	6	Asahi Sato	9 October 1992 (aged 25)			(Japan) Toshiba Ibaragi
IF	7	Tsuyoshi Tamura	6 September 1993 (aged 24)			(Japan) JR West Okayama
IF	8	Michiori Okabe	4 June 1992 (aged 26)			(Japan) Jx-Eneos Tokyo
IF	9	Shohei Morishita	23 June 1994 (aged 24)			(Japan) Hitachi Tokyo
IF	10	Junya Kino	20 October 1992 (aged 25)			(Japan) NTT East Kanagawa
P	11	Yuichiro Okano	16 April 1994 (aged 24)			(Japan) Toshiba Miyagi
IF	12	Yuki Jibiki	25 June 1990 (aged 28)			(Japan) Tokyo Gas Chiba
P	13	Yudai Aranishi	25 August 1992 (aged 26)			(Japan) Honda Kumamoto
P	15	Isamu Usui	2 April 1994 (aged 24)			(Japan) Tokyo Gas Kanagawa
P	17	Makoto Hori	27 February 1995 (aged 23)			(Japan) NTT East Tokyo
P	18	Takumi Takahashi	20 June 1994 (aged 24)			Japan Life Insurance Gumma
P	19	Katsutoshi Satake	14 October 1983 (aged 34)			(Japan) Toyota Kanagawa
P	20	Akiyoshi Katsuno	12 June 1997 (aged 21)			(Japan) Mitsubishi H.I. Gifu
C	23	Takehiro Tsujino	16 June 1993 (aged 25)			(Japan) Honda Ibaragi
OF	24	Kohei Sasagawa	21 April 1994 (aged 24)			(Japan) Tokyo Gas Ibaragi
C	27	Ryo Kinami	10 April 1992 (aged 26)			(Japan) Nippon Express Tokyo
P	34	Ryoga Tomiyama	3 May 1997 (aged 21)			(Japan) Toyota Wakayama
C	36	Takeshi Hosoyamada	29 April 1986 (aged 32)			(Japan) Toyota Kagoshima

Round 2 – Group A

Pos	Team	Pld	W	L	RF	RA	PCT	GB	Qualification
1	Japan	3	3	0	56	2	1.000	—	Super round
2	China	3	2	1	33	20	.667	1	Super round
3	Pakistan	3	1	2	11	32	.333	2	Consolation round
4	Thailand	3	0	3	1	47	.000	3	Consolation round

Source: OCA

26 August; 9:00	Japan	15–0 (F/6)	Pakistan	Rawamangun Baseball Field, Jakarta; Attendance: 200; Umpires: Huang Jun-jeh (TPE)
26 August; 9:00	WP: Yudai Aranishi	Boxscore	LP: Tariq Nadeem	Rawamangun Baseball Field, Jakarta; Attendance: 200; Umpires: Huang Jun-jeh (TPE)
26 August; 9:00	HR: Kohei Sasagawa (1)	Boxscore		Rawamangun Baseball Field, Jakarta; Attendance: 200; Umpires: Huang Jun-jeh (TPE)

Team	1	2	3	4	5	6	7	8	9	R	H	E
Pakistan	0	0	0	0	0	0	—	—	—	0	4	1
Japan	0	4	8	1	1	1	—	—	—	15	15	0

27 August; 14:00	Japan	17–2 (F/5)	China	Rawamangun Baseball Field, Jakarta; Attendance: 150; Umpires: Chu Hsu-kuang (TPE)
27 August; 14:00	WP: Akiyoshi Katsuno	Boxscore	LP: Gong Haicheng	Rawamangun Baseball Field, Jakarta; Attendance: 150; Umpires: Chu Hsu-kuang (TPE)
27 August; 14:00	HR: Shohei Morishita (1), Momotaro Matsumoto (2), Tsuyoshi Tamura (1)	Boxscore		Rawamangun Baseball Field, Jakarta; Attendance: 150; Umpires: Chu Hsu-kuang (TPE)

Team	1	2	3	4	5	6	7	8	9	R	H	E
China	0	0	0	2	0	—	—	—	—	2	5	0
Japan	13	1	2	0	1	—	—	—	—	17	17	0

28 August; 9:00	Thailand	0–24 (F/5)	Japan	Rawamangun Baseball Field, Jakarta; Attendance: 130; Umpires: Sujeewa Wijayanayake (SRI)
28 August; 9:00	LP: Alex Clark	Boxscore	WP: Takumi Takahashi	Rawamangun Baseball Field, Jakarta; Attendance: 130; Umpires: Sujeewa Wijayanayake (SRI)
28 August; 9:00		Boxscore	HR: Tsuyoshi Tamura (2), Yuki Jibiki (1), Michiori Okabe (1), Asahi Sato (1), Kohei Sasagawa (1)	Rawamangun Baseball Field, Jakarta; Attendance: 130; Umpires: Sujeewa Wijayanayake (SRI)

Team	1	2	3	4	5	6	7	8	9	R	H	E
Japan	4	4	5	3	8	—	—	—	—	24	19	1
Thailand	0	0	0	0	0	—	—	—	—	0	0	2

Super round

Pos	Team	Pld	W	L	RF	RA	PCT	GB	Qualification
1	South Korea	3	2	1	16	4	.667 (Note: Tied on head-to-head wins (1). Team quality balance: KOR +0.167, JPN +0.056, TPE −0.222.)	—	Gold medal match
2	Japan	3	2	1	23	7	.667	—	Gold medal match
3	Chinese Taipei	3	2	1	3	6	.667	—	Bronze medal match
4	China	3	0	3	3	28	.000	2	Bronze medal match

Source: OCA
Notes:

30 August; 12:00	Japan	1–5	South Korea	Gelora Bung Karno Baseball Field, Jakarta; Attendance: 637; Umpires: Chu Hsu-kuang (TPE)
30 August; 12:00	LP: Katsutoshi Satake	Boxscore	WP: Lee Yong-chan	Gelora Bung Karno Baseball Field, Jakarta; Attendance: 637; Umpires: Chu Hsu-kuang (TPE)
30 August; 12:00		Boxscore	HR: Kim Ha-seong (1), Park Byung-ho (1), Hwang Jae-gyun (1)	Gelora Bung Karno Baseball Field, Jakarta; Attendance: 637; Umpires: Chu Hsu-kuang (TPE)

Team	1	2	3	4	5	6	7	8	9	R	H	E
South Korea	0	0	2	1	2	0	0	0	0	5	14	1
Japan	0	0	0	0	0	1	0	0	0	1	6	1

31 August; 18:30	Chinese Taipei	0–5	Japan	Gelora Bung Karno Baseball Field, Jakarta; Attendance: 500; Umpires: Park Hi-young (KOR)
31 August; 18:30	LP: Lin Hua-ching	Boxscore	WP: Yuichiro Okano; Sv: Yudai Aranishi	Gelora Bung Karno Baseball Field, Jakarta; Attendance: 500; Umpires: Park Hi-young (KOR)
31 August; 18:30		Boxscore	HR: Tsuyoshi Tamura (1)	Gelora Bung Karno Baseball Field, Jakarta; Attendance: 500; Umpires: Park Hi-young (KOR)

Team	1	2	3	4	5	6	7	8	9	R	H	E
Japan	0	2	0	0	0	1	1	1	0	5	7	0
Chinese Taipei	0	0	0	0	0	0	0	0	0	0	7	2

Final

1 September; 16:00	South Korea	3–0	Japan	Gelora Bung Karno Baseball Field, Jakarta; Attendance: 1,700; Umpires: Huang Jun-jeh (TPE)
1 September; 16:00	WP: Yang Hyeon-jong; Sv: Jung Woo-ram	Boxscore	LP: Ryoga Tomiyama	Gelora Bung Karno Baseball Field, Jakarta; Attendance: 1,700; Umpires: Huang Jun-jeh (TPE)
1 September; 16:00	HR: Park Byung-ho (1)	Boxscore		Gelora Bung Karno Baseball Field, Jakarta; Attendance: 1,700; Umpires: Huang Jun-jeh (TPE)

Team	1	2	3	4	5	6	7	8	9	R	H	E
Japan	0	0	0	0	0	0	0	0	0	0	1	0
South Korea	2	0	1	0	0	0	0	0	X	3	4	2

== Basketball ==
Summary

Team	Event	Group stage						Quarterfinal	Semifinals / Pl.	Final / BM / Pl.	
Team	Event	Opposition score	Opposition score	Opposition score	Opposition score	Opposition score	Rank	Opposition score	Opposition score	Opposition score	Rank
Japan men's	Men's tournament	—N/a		Chinese Taipei; L 65−71	Qatar; W 82−71	Hong Kong; W 88−82	2 Q	Iran; L 67−93	Philippines; L 80−113	Indonesia; W 84−66	7
Japan women's	Women's tournament	—N/a	Hong Kong; W 121−44	China; L 73−105	Mongolia; W 107−35	Thailand; W 91−41	2 Q	Kazakhstan; W 104−57	China; L 74−86	Chinese Taipei; W 76−63	3rd place, bronze medalist(s)
Japan men's	Men's 3x3 tournament	Nepal; W 22−11	Jordan; W 22−7	Maldives; W Disq.	Qatar; W 21−15	Syria; W 21−13	1 Q	Thailand; L 13−21	Did not advance		
Japan women's	Women's 3x3 tournament	—N/a		Mongolia; W 22−1	Chinese Taipei; W 14−10	Nepal; W 21−4	1 Q	Indonesia; W 15−6	Thailand; W 21−16	China; L 10−21	2nd place, silver medalist(s)

=== 5x5 basketball ===
Japan men's team will compete in group C at the Games, while the women's team in group Y.

==== Men's tournament ====
Roster

The following is the Japan roster in the men's basketball tournament of the 2018 Asian Games.

Japan men's national basketball team - 2018 Asian Games roster
Players
Coaches

Pos.	No.	Name	Age – Date of birth	Height	Club	Ctr.
SG	3	Naoto Tsuji	28 – 8 September 1989	1.85 m (6 ft 1 in)	Kawasaki Brave Thunders	(Japan)
PG	4	Taichi Nakamura	21 – 29 June 1997	1.90 m (6 ft 3 in)	Toyama Grouses	(Japan)
C	8	Atsuya Ota	34 – 6 April 1984	2.06 m (6 ft 9 in)	San-en NeoPhoenix	(Japan)
PG	9	Leo Vendrame	24 – 14 November 1993	1.83 m (6 ft 0 in)	Sun Rockers Shibuya	(Japan)
SG	13	Takuya Hashimoto	23 – 3 December 1994	1.88 m (6 ft 2 in)	Osaka Evessa	(Japan)
SF	27	Naoya Kumagae	27 – 16 November 1990	1.95 m (6 ft 5 in)	Osaka Evessa	(Japan)
SF	30	Keita Imamura	22 – 25 January 1996	1.91 m (6 ft 3 in)	Niigata Albirex	(Japan)
C	32	Avi Schafer	20 – 28 January 1998	2.05 m (6 ft 9 in)	Georgia Tech	(United States)
SF	41	Takuma Sato	23 – 10 May 1995	1.94 m (6 ft 4 in)	Shiga Lakestars	(Japan)
PF	43	Yuya Nagayoshi	27 – 14 July 1991	1.99 m (6 ft 6 in)	Kyoto Hannaryz	(Japan)
G/F	65	Shogo Tamaki	21 – 30 August 1996	1.95 m (6 ft 5 in)	University of Tsukuba	(Japan)
SF	88	Tenketsu Harimoto	26 – 8 January 1992	1.98 m (6 ft 6 in)	Nagoya Diamond Dolphins	(Japan)

Head coach

- (Argentina) Herman Mandole

Legend

- (C) Team captain
- (NP) Naturalized player
- Club - describes last
  club before the tournament
- Age - describes age
  on 14 August 2018

Group C

Pos	Team	Pld	W	L	PF	PA	PD	Pts	Qualification
1	Chinese Taipei	3	3	0	252	202	+50	6	Quarterfinals
2	Japan	3	2	1	235	224	+11	5	Quarterfinals
3	Qatar	3	1	2	231	245	−14	4	
4	Hong Kong	3	0	3	229	276	−47	3	

Source: OCA

14 August
10:00

Chinese Taipei	71–65	Japan
Scoring by quarter: 11–17, 19–20, 29–16, 12–12
Pts: Chen Y. 18; Rebs: Liu 9 Asts: Chen Y. 5		Pts: Harimoto 12; Rebs: Sato 8 Asts: Vendrame 6

Gelora Bung Karno Basketball Hall, Jakarta
Referees: Harja Jaladri (INA), Alexey Stepanenko (KAZ), Preeda Muongmee (THA)

16 August
18:30

Japan	82–71	Qatar
Scoring by quarter: 17–23, 22–14, 22–18, 21–16
Pts: Hashimoto 22; Rebs: Schafer 7 Asts: Hashimoto 4		Pts: Ngombo 36; Rebs: Yousuf, Suliman 6 Asts: Suliman 6

Gelora Bung Karno Basketball Hall, Jakarta
Referees: Ferdinand Pascual (PHI), Yevgeniy Mikheyev (KAZ), Kim Jong-kuk (KOR)

22 August
16:00

Japan	88–82	Hong Kong
Scoring by quarter: 22–19, 20–22, 28–20, 18–21
Pts: Ota 19; Rebs: Ota 10; Asts: Vendrame 8		Pts: Leung 35; Rebs: Szeto 16; Asts: Yang 6

Gelora Bung Karno Basketball Hall, Jakarta
Referees: Budi Marfan (INA), Johan Christiana (INA), Haryanto Sutaryo (INA)

Quarter-final

27 August
12:30

Iran	93–67	Japan
Scoring by quarter: 25–14, 17–21, 25–19, 26–13
Pts: Haddadi 22; Rebs: Haddadi 15; Asts: Nikkhah, Kazemi 4		Pts: Kumagae 14; Rebs: Tsuji, Ota 5 Asts: Nakamura 7

Gelora Bung Karno Basketball Hall, Jakarta
Referees: Harja Jaladri (INA), Preeda Muongmee (THA), Chen Ying-cheng (TPE)

Classification 5th–8th

28 August
16:00

Philippines	113–80	Japan
Scoring by quarter: 27–27, 30–20, 25–17, 31–16
Pts: Standhardinger 27; Rebs: Standhardinger 13; Asts: Clarkson 9		Pts: Nakamura 16; Rebs: Schafer 8 Asts: Nakamura 11

Gelora Bung Karno Basketball Hall, Jakarta
Referees: Yuen Chun Yip (HKG), Mohammad Doust (IRI), Kim Jong-kuk (KOR)

Seventh place game

31 August
12:30

Japan	84–66	Indonesia
Scoring by quarter: 21–20, 18–12, 18–22, 27–12
Pts: Tsuji 29; Rebs: Ota 11; Asts: Harimoto 8		Pts: Johnson 23; Rebs: Johnson 12; Asts: Wisnu 6

Istora Gelora Bung Karno, Jakarta
Referees: Yuen Chun Yip (HKG), Kim Jong-kuk (KOR), Preeda Muongmee (THA)

==== Women's tournament ====
Roster

The following is the Japan roster in the women's basketball tournament of the 2018 Asian Games.

Japan women's national basketball team - 2018 Asian Games roster
Players
Coaches

Pos.	No.	Name	Age – Date of birth	Height	Club	Ctr.
PF	2	Layla Takehara	18 – 12 March 2000	1.85 m (6 ft 1 in)	Mitsubishi Electric Koalas	(Japan)
SF	3	Stephanie Mawuli	19 – 25 November 1998	1.81 m (5 ft 11 in)	Toyota Antelopes	(Japan)
C	9	Haruka Suzuki	24 – 20 September 1993	1.83 m (6 ft 0 in)	Hitachi High-Technologies Cougars	(Japan)
SG	11	Mio Shinozaki (C)	26 – 12 September 1991	1.67 m (5 ft 6 in)	Fujitsu Red Wave	(Japan)
PG	15	Shiori Yasuma	24 – 22 July 1994	1.61 m (5 ft 3 in)	Chanson V-Magic	(Japan)
F	22	Miyuki Kawamura	23 – 27 October 1994	1.85 m (6 ft 1 in)	Chanson V-Magic	(Japan)
PG	23	Moe Nagata	21 – 20 June 1997	1.72 m (5 ft 8 in)	Tokyo Medical and Dental University	(Japan)
SG	27	Saki Hayashi	23 – 16 March 1995	1.61 m (5 ft 3 in)	JX-Eneos Sunflowers	(Japan)
PG	32	Saori Miyazaki	22 – 27 August 1995	1.67 m (5 ft 6 in)	JX-Eneos Sunflowers	(Japan)
PF	33	Tamami Nakada	20 – 21 December 1997	1.82 m (6 ft 0 in)	Waseda University	(Japan)
SG	45	Aya Watanabe	26 – 12 August 1992	1.69 m (5 ft 7 in)	Mitsubishi Electric Koalas	(Japan)
C	66	Kadysha Juna Umezawa	20 – 26 July 1998	1.88 m (6 ft 2 in)	JX-Eneos Sunflowers	(Japan)

Head coach

- (Japan) Natsumi Yabuuchi

Assistant coach(es)

- (Japan) Satoshi Sakumoto
- (Japan) Kaori Kusuda

Legend

- (C) Team captain
- (NP) Naturalized player
- Club - describes last
  club before the tournament
- Age - describes age
  on 15 August 2018

Group Y

Pos	Team	Pld	W	L	PF	PA	PD	Pts	Qualification
1	China	4	4	0	448	182	+266	8	Quarterfinals
2	Japan	4	3	1	392	225	+167	7	Quarterfinals
3	Thailand	4	2	2	231	316	−85	6	Quarterfinals
4	Mongolia	4	1	3	193	358	−165	5	Quarterfinals
5	Hong Kong	4	0	4	230	413	−183	4	

Source: OCA

15 August
16:00

Hong Kong	44–121	Japan
Scoring by quarter: 13–29, 15–33, 6–34, 10–25
Pts: Li 13; Rebs: Wong K.Y. 5 Asts: Wong T. 3		Pts: Nagata 23; Rebs: Umezawa 13; Asts: Yasuma, Miyazaki 12

Gelora Bung Karno Basketball Hall, Jakarta
Referees: Yevgeniy Mikheyev (KAZ), Lee Ji-youn (KOR), Johan Christiana (INA)

17 August
12:30

Japan	73–105	China
Scoring by quarter: 22–35, 19–20, 18–26, 14–24
Pts: Hayashi 17; Rebs: Suzuki 6 Asts: Miyazaki 12		Pts: Li M., Liu 18; Rebs: Sun, Han 8 Asts: Shao 7

Gelora Bung Karno Basketball Hall, Jakarta
Referees: Snehal Bendke (IND), Alexey Stepanenko (KAZ), Haryanto Sutaryo (INA)

19 August
12:30

Japan	107–35	Mongolia
Scoring by quarter: 30–11, 34–8, 25–11, 18–5
Pts: Shinozaki 19; Rebs: Suzuki 15; Asts: Yasuma 9		Pts: Bulbul 16; Rebs: Bayartsetseg 7 Asts: Bulbul 3

Gelora Bung Karno Basketball Hall, Jakarta
Referees: Kim Jong-kuk (KOR), Imran Ali Baig (IND), Johan Christiana (INA)

21 August
12:30

Thailand	41–91	Japan
Scoring by quarter: 10–28, 13–22, 16–20, 2–21
Pts: Maihom 12; Rebs: Kunchuan 6 Asts: Saechua, Klanbut 3		Pts: Watanabe 27; Rebs: Umezawa 8 Asts: Yasuma 11

Gelora Bung Karno Basketball Hall, Jakarta
Referees: Snehal Bendke (IND), Chen Ying-cheng (TPE), Budi Marfan (INA)

Quarter-final

26 August
16:00

Japan	104–57	Kazakhstan
Scoring by quarter: 22–21, 23–7, 28–18, 31–11
Pts: Nakada, Watanabe 19; Rebs: Umezawa 9 Asts: Miyazaki 9		Pts: Kondrakova 14; Rebs: Kolesnikova, Kondrakova 9 Asts: Kolesnikova 3

Gelora Bung Karno Basketball Hall, Jakarta
Referees: Mohammad Doust (IRI), Watcharin Padungratchadakit (THA), Chen Ying-cheng (TPE)

Semifinal

30 August
12:30

Japan	74–86	China
Scoring by quarter: 17–20, 13–20, 24–31, 20–15
Pts: Shinozaki 17; Rebs: Nakada, Watanabe, Umezawa 4 Asts: Miyazaki 10		Pts: Shao 16; Rebs: Li Yue. 8 Asts: Shao 6

Istora Gelora Bung Karno, Jakarta
Referees: Watcharin Padungratchadakit (THA), Mohammad Doust (IRI), Haryanto Sutaryo (INA)

Bronze medal game

1 September
10:00

Chinese Taipei	63–76	Japan
Scoring by quarter: 14–20, 19–6, 13–26, 17–24
Pts: Cheng 16; Rebs: Wang, Cheng 7 Asts: Chen Y.C. 5		Pts: Hayashi 17; Rebs: Umezawa 9 Asts: Miyazaki 11

Istora Gelora Bung Karno, Jakarta
Referees: Lee Ji-youn (KOR), Watcharin Padungratchadakit (THA), Imran Ali Baig (IND)

=== 3x3 basketball ===
Japan national 3x3 team participated in the Games. The men's team placed in the pool C and the women's team in the pool B based on the FIBA 3x3 federation ranking.

==== Men's tournament ====
Roster

The following is the Japan roster in the men's 3x3 basketball tournament of the 2018 Asian Games.

- Ryuto Yasuoka (10)
- Hayate Arakawa (14)
- Tensho Sugimoto (23)
- Yoshiyuki Matsuwaki (24)

Pool C

Pos	Team	Pld	W	L	PF	PA	PD	Qualification
1	Japan	5	5	0	86	46	+40	Quarterfinals
2	Qatar	5	4	1	74	43	+31	Quarterfinals
3	Syria	5	3	2	62	76	−14	
4	Nepal	5	2	3	59	74	−15	
5	Jordan	5	1	4	43	85	−42	
—	Maldives	5	0	5	0	0	0	

Source: OCA

21 August
17:10

Japan	22–11	Nepal
Pts: Matsuwaki 11		Pts: Maharjan, Bhandari 4

Gelora Bung Karno Tennis Center Court, Jakarta
Referees: Rulyov (KAZ), Al-Harthi (OMA)

21 August
19:20

Jordan	7–22	Japan
Pts: Juha 5		Pts: Arakawa 10

Gelora Bung Karno Tennis Center Court, Jakarta
Referees: Ho (HKG), Lim (MAS)

24 August
16:20

Japan	vs.	Maldives
Forfeit

Gelora Bung Karno Tennis Center Court, Jakarta

24 August
16:00

Japan	21–15	Qatar
Pts: Matsuwaki 10		Pts: Muslić 8

Gelora Bung Karno Tennis Center Court, Jakarta
Referees: Ho (HKG), Shi (CHN)

Quarter-final

26 August
16:30

Japan	13–21	Thailand
Pts: Matsuwaki 10		Pts: Korsah-dick 10

Gelora Bung Karno Tennis Center Court, Jakarta
Referees: Ho (HKG), Quinn (INA)

==== Women's tournament ====
Roster

The following is the Japan roster in the women's 3x3 basketball tournament of the 2018 Asian Games.

- Ririka Okuyama (4)
- Norika Konno (8)
- Miwa Kuribayashi (16)
- Kiho Miyashita (18)

Pool B

Pos	Team	Pld	W	L	PF	PA	PD	Qualification
1	Japan	3	3	0	57	15	+42	Quarterfinals
2	Chinese Taipei	3	2	1	50	32	+18	Quarterfinals
3	Mongolia	3	1	2	23	54	−31	
4	Nepal	3	0	3	23	52	−29	

Source: OCA

22 August
15:40

Mongolia	1–22	Japan
Pts: Khulan 1		Pts: Okuyama 10

Gelora Bung Karno Tennis Center Court, Jakarta
Referees: Lim (MAS), Quinn (INA)

22 August
18:20

Japan	14–10	Chinese Taipei
Pts: Miyashita 6		Pts: Wang 4

Gelora Bung Karno Tennis Center Court, Jakarta
Referees: Shi (CHN), Tan (SGP)

25 August
20:50

Japan	21–4	Nepal
Pts: Konno 8		Pts: Malla 3

Gelora Bung Karno Tennis Center Court, Jakarta
Referees: Al-Harthi (OMA), Ibragimow (TKM)

Quarter-final

26 August
15:30

Japan	15–6	Indonesia
Pts: Okuyama, Mawuli 5		Pts: Apriyani 3

Gelora Bung Karno Tennis Center Court, Jakarta
Referees: Shi (CHN), Liu (MAS)

Semifinal

26 August
17:30

Japan	21–16	Thailand
Pts: Mawuli 8		Pts: Bunsinprom 8

Gelora Bung Karno Tennis Center Court, Jakarta
Referees: Shi (CHN), Al-Harthi (OMA)

Gold medal game

26 August
20:30

China	21–10	Japan
Pts: Li, Jiang 7		Pts: Mawuli 4

Gelora Bung Karno Tennis Center Court, Jakarta
Referees: Lim (MAS), Rulyov (KAZ)

== Bowling ==
Men

Athlete	Event	Block 1	Block 2	Total	Rank	Stepladder final 1	Stepladder final 2	Rank
Athlete	Event	Result	Result	Total	Rank	Opposition Result	Opposition Result	Rank
Shusako Asato	Masters	1859	1775	3634	11	Did not advance		
Takayu Miyazawa	Masters	1882	2000	3882	5	Did not advance		
Tomoyuki Sasaki; Shogo Wada; Shusaku Asato	Trios	2286	2058	4344	1st place, gold medalist(s)	—N/a		
Daisuke Yoshida; Takuya Miyazawa; Shota Koki	Trios	2132	2024	4156	8	—N/a		
Tomoyuki Sasaki; Shogo Wada; Shusaku Asato; Daisuke Yoshida; Takuya Miyazawa; Shota Koki	Team of six	4127	4004	8131	4	—N/a		

Women

Athlete	Event	Block 1	Block 2	Total	Rank	Stepladder final 1	Stepladder final 2	Rank
Athlete	Event	Result	Result	Total	Rank	Opposition Result	Opposition Result	Rank
Mirai Ishimoto	Masters	1966	1982	3948	1 Q	Bye	Lee Y-j (KOR); W 481–473	1st place, gold medalist(s)
Yuri Sato	Masters	1847	1870	3717	8	Did not advance		
Yuri Sato; Megumi Kitamura; Hikaru Takekawa	Trios	1891	1966	3857	12	—N/a		
Mirai Ishimoto; Futaba Imai; Misaki Mukotani	Trios	1845	1928	3773	14	—N/a		
Yuri Sato; Megumi Kitamura; Hikaru Takekawa; Mirai Ishimoto; Futaba Imai; Misaki Mukotani	Team of six	3917	3961	7878	6	—N/a		

== Boxing ==
Men

Athlete	Event	Round of 32	Round of 16	Quarterfinals	Semifinals	Final	Rank
Athlete	Event	Opposition Result	Opposition Result	Opposition Result	Opposition Result	Opposition Result	Rank
Tomoya Tsuboi	–49 kg	T Wangdi (BHU); W 5–0	T Zhussupov (KAZ); L 2–3	Did not advance			
Ryomei Tanaka	–52 kg	G Solanki (IND); W 5–0	G Gan-Erdene (MGL); L 1–4	Did not advance			
Hayato Tsutsumi	–56 kg	K Enkh-Amar (MGL); L 2–3	Did not advance				
Arashi Morisaka	–60 kg	H Imankuliyev (TKM); L 0–5	Did not advance				
Daisuke Narimatsu	–64 kg	Bye	L Gha (INA); W 5–0	K Aal Ezirej (IRQ); W 4–0	I Kholdarov (UZB); L 0–5	Did not advance	3rd place, bronze medalist(s)
Issei Aramoto	–69 kg	Bye	S Kazemzadeh (IRI); L 0–5	Did not advance			
Yuito Moriwaki	–75 kg	A Khankhokkhruea (THA); L 2–3	Did not advance				

Women

Athlete	Event	Round of 32	Round of 16	Quarterfinals	Semifinals	Final	Rank
Athlete	Event	Opposition Result	Opposition Result	Opposition Result	Opposition Result	Opposition Result	Rank
Madoka Wada	–51 kg	Bye	A Koddithuwakku (SRI); W 4–1	Pang C-m (PRK); L RSC	Did not advance		

== Canoeing ==
=== Slalom ===
Athlete	Event	Heats		Semifinal		Final	
Athlete	Event	Best	Rank	Time	Rank	Time	Rank
Takuya Haneda	Men's C-1	91.27	5 Q	92.63	2 Q	90.06	1st place, gold medalist(s)
Shota Sasaki	Men's C-1	93.40	8 Q	92.90	3	Did not advance	
Kazuya Adachi	Men's K-1	86.77	5 Q	86.10	2 Q	90.26	2nd place, silver medalist(s)
Taku Yoshida	Men's K-1	81.67	2 Q	86.49	3	Did not advance	
Ren Mishima	Women's C-1	110.59	3 Q	122.62	3 Q	116.96	4
Aki Yazawa	Women's K-1	88.82	1 Q	100.50	2 Q	95.83	1st place, gold medalist(s)
Yuriko Takeshita	Women's K-1	104.91	4 Q	105.05	4	Did not advance	

=== Sprint ===
Athlete	Event	Heats		Semifinal		Final	
Athlete	Event	Time	Rank	Time	Rank	Time	Rank
Kaiki Oshiro	Men's C-1 1000 m	—N/a				4:11.232	5
Hikaru Sato; Takanori Tome	Men's C-2 1000 m	—N/a				4:00.763	7
Momotaro Matsushita	Men's K-1 200 m	38.079	2 QF	Bye		37.163	7
Keiji Mizumoto; Seiji Komatsu	Men's K-2 1000 m	3:41.327	3 QF	Bye		3:35.207	5
Hiroki Fujishima; Momotaro Matsushita; Seiji Komatsu; Keiji Mizumoto	Men's K-4 500 m	1:25.628	1 QF	Bye		1:26.939	4
Megumi Tsubota	Women's C-1 200 m	54.278	5 QS	50.758	1 QF	53.520	9
Manaka Kubota; Teruko Kiriake	Women's C-2 500 m	—N/a				2:09.400	4
Yuka Ono	Women's K-1 200 m	44.016	2 QF	Bye		43.092	3rd place, bronze medalist(s)
Yuka Ono	Women's K-1 500 m	—N/a				2:03.206	4
Yuka Ono; Hideka Tatara	Women's K-2 500 m	—N/a				1:49.143	3rd place, bronze medalist(s)

Qualification legend: QF=Final; QS=Semifinal

=== Canoe polo (demonstration) ===
Athlete	Event	1st round (qualification)		2nd round (loser pool)		Semifinal	Final / BM	
Athlete	Event	Opposition Score	Rank	Opposition Score	Rank	Opposition Score	Opposition Score	Rank
Yuuki Horie; Hiroki Horiuchi; Takayuki Igawa; Ryota Kimura; Katsuyuki Shibata; Takahiko Yanagi	Men's tournament	Chinese Taipei (TPE): W 7–4; Hong Kong (HKG): W 24–0; Thailand (THA): W 21–0	1 Q	Bye		Iran (IRI); W 9–8	Malaysia (MAS); W 8–2	1st place, gold medalist(s)
	Women's tournament	Chinese Taipei (TPE): L 2–7; Hong Kong (HKG): W 15–1; Thailand (THA): W 9–3	2 Q	Bye		Singapore (SGP); L 1–4	Chinese Taipei (TPE); L 3–11	4

== Contract bridge ==
Men

Athlete	Event	Qualification		Semifinal		Final	
Athlete	Event	Point	Rank	Point	Rank	Point	Rank
Kazuo Furuta; Hiroki Yokoi	Pair	1654.4	4 Q	1015.2	16	Did not advance	
Tadashi Teramoto; Shugo Tanaka	Pair	1605.2	9 Q	1041.8	13	Did not advance	
Masayuki Tanaka; Hiroshi Kaku	Pair	1380.1	28	Did not advance			
Tadashi Teramoto; Masayuki Tanaka; Hiroshi Kaku; Kazuo Furuta; Shugo Tanaka; Hiroki Yokoi	Team	151.46	7	Did not advance			

Mixed

Athlete	Event	Qualification		Semifinal		Final	
Athlete	Event	Point	Rank	Point	Rank	Point	Rank
Takumi Seshimo; Tomoe Nakao	Pair	1312.5	2 Q	742.7	4 Q	314	11
Toshihiro Katsube; Masako Katsube	Pair	1140	20	Did not advance			
Mariko Ueda; Tetsuya Ueda	Pair	1131.7	21	Did not advance			
Masako Katsube; Mariko Ueda; Tomoe Nakao; Toshihiro Katsube; Takumi Seshimo; Tetsuya Ueda	Team	136.44	5	Did not advance			

== Cycling ==
=== BMX ===
Athlete	Event	Seeding run		Motos		Final	
Athlete	Event	Time	Rank	Point	Rank	Time	Rank
Yoshitaku Nagasako	Men's race	35.22	1	4	1 Q	33.669	1st place, gold medalist(s)
Jukia Yoshimura	Men's race	36.53	6	3	1 Q	38.334	6
Sae Hatakeyama	Women's race	38.35	1	4	1 Q	1:27.372	8

=== Mountain biking ===
Athlete	Event	Final	
Athlete	Event	Time	Rank
Toki Sawada	Men's cross-country	1:41:10	6

=== Road ===
Athlete	Event	Final	
Athlete	Event	Time	Rank
Fumiyuki Beppu	Men's road race	3:25:25	2nd place, silver medalist(s)
Hideto Nakane	Men's road race	3:25:40	5
Miyoko Karami	Women's road race	3:09:00	20
Eri Yonamine	Women's road race	2:57:07	3rd place, bronze medalist(s)
Fumiyuki Beppu	Men's time trial	57:19.20	3rd place, bronze medalist(s)
Eri Yonamine	Women's time trial	31:57.26	2nd place, silver medalist(s)

=== Track ===
Sprint

Athlete	Event	Qualification		Round of 32	Round of 16	Quarterfinals	Semifinals	Final	
Athlete	Event	Time	Rank	Opposition Time	Opposition Time	Opposition Time	Opposition Time	Opposition Time	Rank
Tomohiro Fukaya	Men's sprint	10.052	6	Bye	E Khademi (IRI); W 10.250	Zhou Y (CHN); W 10.337	SF Sahrom (MAS); W 10.096 (FA)	A Awang (MAS); L	2nd place, silver medalist(s)
Yuta Wakimoto	Men's sprint	9.963	4	Bye	M Daneshvar (IRI); W 10.531	A Awang (MAS); L	Did not advance		7
Kayono Maeda	Women's sprint	11.305	8	—N/a	R Ota (JPN); L	Did not advance			9
Riyu Ota	Women's sprint	11.360	9	—N/a	K Maeda (JPN); W 11.464	Lee WS (HKG); L	Did not advance		8

Team sprint

Athlete	Event	Qualification		Final	
Athlete	Event	Time	Rank	Opposition Time	Rank
Kazuki Amagai; Yudai Nitta; Tomohiro Fukaya; Yuta Wakimoto^{b}	Men's team sprint	44.489	4 FB	South Korea (KOR); W 43.899	3rd place, bronze medalist(s)
Kayono Maeda; Riyu Ota	Women's team sprint	34.132	4 FB	South Korea (KOR); L	4

^{b} Riders who entered the competition but did not participating in any phase of the team event.
Qualification legend: FA=Gold medal final; FB=Bronze medal final

Pursuit

Athlete	Event	Qualification		Round 1		Final	
Athlete	Event	Time	Rank	Opposition Time	Rank	Opposition Time	Rank
Ryo Chikatani	Men's pursuit	4:26.503	2 FA	—N/a		Park S-h (KOR); L	2nd place, silver medalist(s)
Kisato Nakamura	Women's pursuit	3:50.604	6	—N/a		Did not advance	
Shogo Ichimaru; Shunsuke Imamura; Ryo Chikatani; Eiya Hashimoto; Keitaro Sawada^{[a]}	Men's team pursuit	4:12.173	5 Q	United Arab Emirates (UAE); W 4:04.222	1 FB	Kazakhstan (KAZ); W	3rd place, bronze medalist(s)
Yuya Hashimoto; Miho Yoshikawa; Kisato Nakamura; Yumi Kajihara; Nao Suzuki^{[a]}	Women's team pursuit	4:33.768	3 Q	China (CHN); L	2 FB	Hong Kong (HKG); W	3rd place, bronze medalist(s)

^{a} Riders who participated in the heats only and received medals.
Qualification legend: FA=Gold medal final; FB=Bronze medal final

Keirin

Athlete	Event	1st Round	Repechage	2nd Round	Final
Athlete	Event	Rank	Rank	Rank	Rank
Yudai Nitta	Men's keirin	1 Q	Bye	2 FA	2nd place, silver medalist(s)
Yuta Wakimoto	Men's keirin	1 Q	Bye	1 FA	5
Kayono Maeda	Women's keirin	6 R	4	Did not advance	
Riyu Ota	Women's keirin	4 R	1 Q	4 FB	8

Qualification legend: FA=Gold medal final; FB=Bronze medal final

Omnium

Athlete	Event	Scratch race		Tempo race		Elimination race		Points race		Total points	Rank
Athlete	Event	Rank	Points	Rank	Points	Rank	Points	Rank	Points	Total points	Rank
Eiya Hashimoto	Men's omnium	8	26	2	38	1	40	3	15	119	1st place, gold medalist(s)
Yumi Kajihara	Women's omnium	3	36	1	40	1	40	3	22	138	1st place, gold medalist(s)

Madison

Athlete	Event	Points	Laps	Rank
Eiya Hashimoto; Shunsuke Imamura	Men's madison	28	0	3rd place, bronze medalist(s)
Yuya Hashimoto; Yumi Kajihara	Women's madison	14	0	4

== Diving ==
Men

Athlete	Event	Preliminaries		Final	
Athlete	Event	Points	Rank	Points	Rank
Sho Sakai	3 m springboard	443.65	4 Q	430.80	5
Ken Terauchi	3 m springboard	413.85	6 Q	431.30	4
Kazuki Murakami	10 m platform	424.85	6 Q	386.65	7
Sho Sakai; Ken Terauchi	3 m synchronized springboard	—N/a		408.57	3rd place, bronze medalist(s)

Women

Athlete	Event	Preliminaries		Final	
Athlete	Event	Points	Rank	Points	Rank
Minami Itahashi	1 m springboard	235.65	7 Q	226.15	6
Sayaka Mikami	3 m springboard	312.60	3 Q	321.60	4
Hazuki Miyamoto	3 m springboard	280.50	6 Q	295.80	6
Matsuri Arai	10 m platform	314.10	5 Q	341.85	5
Sayaka Mikami; Hazuki Miyamoto	3 m synchronized springboard	—N/a		249.90	5
Matsuri Arai; Minami Itahashi	10 m synchronized platform	—N/a		301.56	4

== Equestrian ==
Dressage

Athlete	Horse	Event	Prix St-Georges		Intermediate I		Intermediate I Freestyle	
Athlete	Horse	Event	Score	Rank	Score	Rank	Score	Rank
Akane Kuroki	Toots	Individual	69.675	5 Q	65.470	16	Did not advance	
Kazuki Sado	Djuice	Individual	68.793 #	9 Q	66.674	11	Did not advance	
Masanao Takahashi	Fabriano 58	Individual	69.823	4 Q	70.558	4 Q	69.195	9
Shunsuke Terui	Alias Max	Individual	68.999	7 Q	69.411	5 Q	74.735	4
Masanao Takahashi; Shunsuke Terui; Kazuki Sado; Akane Kuroki	See above	Team	69.499	1st place, gold medalist(s)	—N/a			

Eventing

Athlete	Horse	Event	Dressage		Cross-country			Jumping		
Athlete	Horse	Event	Penalties	Rank	Penalties	Total	Rank	Penalties	Total	Rank
Kenta Hiranaga	Delago	Individual	29.10	5	0.00	29.10	4 Q	4.00 #	33.10	7
Ryuzo Kitajima	Koko Doro	Individual	29.60	7	0.00	29.60	5 Q	0.00	29.60	4
Yoshiaki Oiwa	Bart L Jra	Individual	22.70	2	0.00	22.70	2 Q	0.00	22.70	1st place, gold medalist(s)
Takayuki Yumira	Poacher's Hope	Individual	30.10 #	9	0.00 #	30.10	6 Q	0.00	30.10	5
Yoshiaki Oiwa; Kenta Hiranaga; Ryuzo Kitajima; Takayuki Yumira	See above	Team	81.40	1		81.40	1		82.40	1st place, gold medalist(s)

Jumping

Athlete	Horse	Event	Qualification		Qualifier 1			Qualifier 2 Team Final			Final round A			Final round B		
Athlete	Horse	Event	Points	Rank	Penalties	Total	Rank	Penalties	Total	Rank	Penalties	Total	Rank	Penalties	Total	Rank
Daisuke Fukushima	Cornet 36	Individual	5.12	19	1	6.12	12	1	7.12	10	0	7.12	7	Did not advance		
Toshiki Masui	Carthagena 6	Individual	5.26 #	20	8 #	13.26	25 Q	9 #	22.26	29	Did not advance					
Shota Ogomori	Sig Iron Man	Individual	3.11	10	0	3.11	6 Q	0	3.11	5 Q	4	7.11	6 Q	0	7.11	5
Taizo Sugitani	Heroine de Muze	Individual	2.51	7	0	2.51	5 Q	0	2.51	4 Q	4	6.51	5 Q	0	6.51	4
Taizo Sugitani; Shota Ogomori; Toshiki Masui; Daisuke Fukushima	See above	Team	10.74	3	1	11.74	2 Q	1	11.74	2nd place, silver medalist(s)	—N/a					

1. – indicates that the score of this rider does not count in the team competition, since only the best three results of a team are counted.

== Esports (demonstration) ==
Hearthstone

Athlete	ID	Event	Quarterfinals	Semifinals	Final / BM	
Athlete	ID	Event	Opposition score	Opposition score	Opposition score	Rank
Akasaka Tetsuro	Tredsred	Hearthstone	India; L 2–3	Did not advance		

Pro Evolution Soccer

Athlete	ID	Event	Group stage		Semifinals	Final / BM	
Athlete	ID	Event	Oppositions scores	Rank	Opposition score	Opposition score	Rank
Naoki Sugimura; Tsubasa Aihara	SOFIA; Leva	Pro Evolution Soccer	Indonesia: W 2–0; Vietnam: W 2–0; India: W 2–0	1 Q	Malaysia; W 2–0	Iran; W 2–1	1st place, gold medalist(s)

== Fencing ==
Individual

Athlete	Event	Preliminary		Round of 32	Round of 16	Quarterfinals	Semifinals	Final	
Athlete	Event	Opposition score	Rank	Opposition score	Opposition score	Opposition score	Opposition score	Opposition score	Rank
Koki Kano	Men's épée	Nguyễn TN (VIE): W 5–4; Chantharapidok (THA): W 5–0; Fong HS (HKG): W 5–2; R Petrov (KGZ): W 5–2; M Esmaeili (IRI): W 5–3	1 Q	Bye	Nguyễn TN (VIE); W 15–13	K Minobe (JPN); W 15–6	Park S-y (KOR); L 11–15	Did not advance	3rd place, bronze medalist(s)
Kazuyasu Minobe	Men's épée	K Baudunov (KGZ): L 1–5; Ho WH (HKG): W 5–2; M Mirzaei (QAT): W 5–1; R Kurbanov (KAZ): W 5–2; R Pratama (INA): W 5–3	2 Q	R Pratama (INA); W 15–8	Koh IJ (MAS); W 15–10	K Kano (JPN); L 6–15	Did not advance		6
Toshiya Saito	Men's foil	H Yoong (MAS): W 5–0; S Lama (NEP): W 5–2; M Zulfikar (INA): W 5–1; Son Y-k (KOR): L 1–5; A Owaida (QAT): W 5–0	2 Q	Bye	Chen C-c (TPE); W 15–12	Cheung KL (HKG); L 3–15	Did not advance		5
Takahiro Shikine	Men's foil	C Theara (CAM): W 5–0; MP Bhatt (NEP): W 5–0; Huang MK (CHN): W 5–3; JI Lim (SGP): W 5–1; Hoàng NH (VIE): W 5–3	1 Q	Bye	KJ Chan (SGP); L 12–15	Did not advance			9
Kenta Tokunan	Men's sabre	Kitsiriboon (THA): W 5–4; N Karim (KAZ): W 5–2; Gu B-g (KOR): L 0–5; A Al-Hammadi (UAE): W 5–0	2 Q	Bye	Nguyễn XL (VIE); W 15–9	Oh S-u (KOR); L 4–15	Did not advance		6
Kento Yoshida	Men's sabre	A Pakdaman (IRI): L 2–5; Lam HC (HKG): W 5–0; A Salmanpoor (QAT): W 5–1; IA Setiawan (INA): L 4–5; Nguyễn XL (VIE): L 4–5	4 Q	Bye	Oh S-u (KOR); L 7–15	Did not advance			14
Shiori Komata	Women's épée	K Thanee (THA): W 5–3; V Kong (HKG): L 2–5; T Al-Abdulla (QAT): W 5–2; K Ganbold (MGL): W 5–3; Nguyễn TNH (VIE): W 5–2	2 Q	Bye	C Lim (SGP); W 15–10	Sun YW (CHN); L 5–15	Did not advance		8
Kanna Oishi	Women's épée	Megawati (INA): W 5–2; JS Singh (IND): W 5–1; Kang Y-m (KOR): L 3–4; Trần TTT (VIE): W 5–2; N Salameh (LBN): W 5–4	2 Q	Bye	K Thanee (THA); W 15–14	Kang Y-m (KOR); L 8–15	Did not advance		6
Sera Azuma	Women's foil	MI Esteban (PHI): W 5–4; A Berthier (SGP): W 5–3; Huo XX (CHN): W 5–1; M Ananda (INA): W 5–1; T Fong (MAS): W 5–1	1 Q	Bye	MI Esteban (PHI); W 15–8	K Miyawaki (JPN); W 15–7	Jeon H-s (KOR); L 9–15	Did not advance	3rd place, bronze medalist(s)
Karin Miyawaki	Women's foil	Fu YT (CHN): L 0–5; Thongchampa (THA): W 5–0; Ho KU (MAC): W 5–2; SK Catantan (PHI): W 5–2; RA Jaoude (LBN): W 5–2	2 Q	Bye	Đỗ TA (VIE); W 15–10	S Azuma (JPN); L 7–15	Did not advance		6
Shihomi Fukushima	Women's sabre	C Linly (CAM): W 5–3; R Thapa (NEP): W 5–0; D Permatasari (INA): W 5–3; FR Delcheh (IRI): W 5–3; Yoon J-s (KOR): W 5–1	1 Q	Bye	T Pokeaw (THA); W 15–3	Shao YQ (CHN); L 12–15	Did not advance		5
Norika Tamura	Women's sabre	K Shreshta (NEP): W 5–0; Qian JR (CHN): L 3–5; Bùi TTH (VIE): W 5–2; Au SY (HKG): W 5–3; Y Ariunzayaa (MGL): W 5–1	2 Q	Bye	Y Lau (SGP); W 15–7	Yoon J-s (KOR); W 15–13	Shao YQ (CHN); L 14–15	Did not advance	3rd place, bronze medalist(s)

Team

Athlete	Event	Round of 16	Quarterfinals	Semifinals	Final	
Athlete	Event	Opposition score	Opposition score	Opposition score	Opposition score	Rank
Koki Kano; Kazuyasu Minobe; Satoru Uyama; Masaru Yamada	Men's épée	Pakistan (PAK); W 45–19	Uzbekistan (UZB); W 45–38	Kazakhstan (KAZ); W 45–36	China (CHN); W 30–22	1st place, gold medalist(s)
Kyosuke Matsuyama; Toshiya Saito; Takahiro Shikine; Kenta Suzumura	Men's foil	Bye	Singapore (SGP); W 45–29	Hong Kong (HKG); L 42–45	Did not advance	3rd place, bronze medalist(s)
Tomohiro Shimamura; Kaito Streets; Kenta Tokunan; Kento Yoshida	Men's sabre	Bye	China (CHN); L 24–45	Did not advance		6
Haruna Baba; Shiori Komata; Kanna Oishi; Ayumi Yamada	Women's épée	Bye	Singapore (SGP); W 45–38	South Korea (KOR); L 33–45	Did not advance	3rd place, bronze medalist(s)
Sera Azuma; Karin Miyawaki; Komaki Kikuchi; Sumire Tsuji	Women's foil	Bye	Lebanon (LBN); W 45–9	South Korea (KOR); W 45–36	China (CHN); W 35–34	1st place, gold medalist(s)
Chika Aoki; Shihomi Fukushima; Risa Takashima; Norika Tamura	Women's sabre	Bye	Indonesia (INA); W 45–22	South Korea (KOR); L 25–45	Did not advance	3rd place, bronze medalist(s)

== Field hockey ==
Japan men's and women's team qualified automatically via 2014 Asian Games, both teams were placed in the pool A respectively.

Summary

Team	Event	Group stage						Semifinal	Final / BM	
Team	Event	Opposition Score	Opposition Score	Opposition Score	Opposition Score	Opposition Score	Rank	Opposition Score	Opposition Score	Rank
Japan men's	Men's tournament	Sri Lanka; W 11–0	Indonesia; W 3–1	India; L 0–8	Hong Kong; W 13–0	South Korea; W 3–2	2 Q	Pakistan; W 1–0	Malaysia; W 3–1^{P} FT: 6–6	1st place, gold medalist(s)
Japan women's	Women's tournament	Chinese Taipei; W 11–0	Hong Kong; W 6–0	China; W 4–2	Malaysia; W 3–1	—N/a	1 Q	South Korea; W 2–0	India; W 2–1	1st place, gold medalist(s)

=== Men's tournament ===
Roster

The following is the Japan roster in the men's field hockey tournament of the 2018 Asian Games.

Head coach: (Netherlands) Siegfried Aikman

1. Koji Yamasaki
4. Genki Mitani
5. Seren Tanaka
6. Hiromasa Ochiai
7. Kazuma Murata
8. Suguru Hoshi
9. Kenta Tanaka
11. Kenji Kitazato
13. Manabu Yamashita (C)
14. Kaito Tanaka
17. Kentaro Fukuda
20. Masaki Ohashi
25. Shota Yamada
28. Yusuke Takano (GK)
29. Hirotaka Zendana
30. Takashi Yoshikawa (GK)
31. Kota Watanabe
32. Yoshiki Kirishita

Pool A

Pos	Team	Pld	W	D	L	PF	PA	PD	Pts	Qualification
1	India	5	5	0	0	76	3	+73	15	Semi-finals
2	Japan	5	4	0	1	30	11	+19	12	Semi-finals
3	South Korea	5	3	0	2	39	8	+31	9	Fifth place game
4	Sri Lanka	5	2	0	3	7	41	−34	6	Seventh place game
5	Indonesia (H)	5	1	0	4	5	40	−35	3	Ninth place game
6	Hong Kong	5	0	0	5	3	57	−54	0	Eleventh place game

Source: FIH
Rules for classification: 1) points; 2) goal difference; 3) goals scored; 4) head-to-head result.
(H) Hosts

20 August 2018
14:00

Japan	11–0	Sri Lanka
Zendana 2'; Ke. Tanaka 9', 19'; Yamashita 11'; Yamasaki 13', 28'; Mitani 14'; Murata 32', 34', 54'; Kirishita 52'	Report

Umpires:
Gareth Greenfield (NZL)
Salim Lucky (BAN)

22 August 2018
18:00

Indonesia	1–3	Japan
Rahmad 18'	Report	Zendana 14'; Murata 43'; Ke. Tanaka 49'

Umpires:
Salim Lucky (BAN)
Ilanggo Kanabathu (MAS)

24 August 2018
20:00

Japan	0–8	India
	Report	S. V. Sunil 7'; Dilpreet 12'; Rupinder 17', 38'; Mandeep 32', 57'; Akashdeep 46'; Prasad 47'

Umpires:
Ilanggo Kanabathu (MAS)
Federico Garcia (URU)

26 August 2018
12:00

Hong Kong	0–13	Japan
	Report	S. Tanaka 10'; Ka. Tanaka 10', 29'; Ke. Tanaka 22', 38'; Zendana 24'; Ochiai 27'; Yamasaki 30', 41'; Fukuda 44', 51'; Murata 47'; Yamada 59'

Umpires:
You Suolong (CHN)
Hafiz Atif Latif (PAK)

28 August 2018
20:00

Japan	3–2	South Korea
Murata 28', 46', 49'	Report	Kim J 39'; Jang 48'

Umpires:
Rawi Anbananthan (MAS)
Gus Soteriades (USA)

Semifinal

30 August 2018
20:00

Pakistan	0–1	Japan
	Report	Yamada 18'

Umpires:
Javed Shaikh (IND)
Federico Garcia (URU)

Gold medal game

1 September 2018
20:00

Malaysia	6–6	Japan
Razie 4'; Tajuddin 11', 12', 59'; Faizal 17'; Amirol 50'	Report	S. Tanaka 9'; Ke. Tanaka 23', 53'; Ka. Tanaka 52'; Yamasaki 58'; Ochiai 60'
Penalties
Firhan (penalty shoot-out scored); Faizal (penalty shoot-out missed); M. Hasan (penalty shoot-out missed); Tajuddin (penalty shoot-out missed)	1–3	(penalty shoot-out scored) Yamasaki; (penalty shoot-out scored) Ke. Tanaka; (penalty shoot-out missed) S. Tanaka; (penalty shoot-out missed) Ochiai; (penalty shoot-out scored) Murata

Umpires:
Javed Shaikh (IND)
Kim Hong-lae (KOR)

=== Women's tournament ===
Roster

The following is the Japan roster in the women's field hockey tournament of the 2018 Asian Games.

Head coach: (Australia) Anthony Farry

1. Megumi Kageyama (GK)
2. Natsuki Naito
3. Akiko Ota
4. Emi Nishikori
5. Shihori Oikawa
6. Kimika Hoshi
7. Mayumi Ono
8. Yukari Mano
9. Akiko Kato
10. Hazuki Nagai
11. Minami Shimizu
12. Yuri Nagai
13. Aki Yamada
14. Maho Segawa
15. Yui Ishibashi
16. Mami Karino
17. Motomi Kawamura (C)
18. Akio Tanaka (GK)

Pool A

Pos	Team	Pld	W	D	L	PF	PA	PD	Pts	Qualification
1	Japan	4	4	0	0	24	3	+21	12	Semifinals
2	China	4	2	1	1	28	6	+22	7	Semifinals
3	Malaysia	4	2	1	1	22	5	+17	7	5th place game
4	Chinese Taipei	4	1	0	3	3	33	−30	3	7th place game
5	Hong Kong	4	0	0	4	2	32	−30	0	9th place game

Source: FIH
Rules for classification: 1) points; 2) goal difference; 3) goals scored; 4) head-to-head result.

19 August 2018
16:00

Japan	11–0	Chinese Taipei
H Nagai 3', 6', 20', 43', 54'; Kawamura 9', 13', 21', 52'; Nishikori 32'; Karino 59'	Report

Umpires:
Suzi Sutton (USA)
Binish Hayat (PAK)

21 August 2018
14:00

Japan	6–0	Hong Kong
Yamada 11', 42'; Ono 26'; Aikawa 33'; Nishikori 37', 59'	Report

Umpires:
Ayanna McClean (TTO)
Ornpimol Kittiteerasopon (THA)

25 August 2018
18:00

Japan	4–2	China
Shimizu 4', 8'; Oikawa 19'; Kato 26'	Report	Gu 12', 32'

Umpires:
Kelly Hudson (NZL)
Kim Yoon-seon (KOR)

27 August 2018
20:00

Malaysia	1–3	Japan
Zulkifli 47'	Report	Karino 21'; Nagai 38', 50'

Umpires:
Suzi Sutton (USA)
Ayanna McClean (TTO)

Semifinal

29 August 2018
17:30

Japan	2–0	South Korea
Ota 49'; Shimizu 60'	Report

Umpires:
Kelly Hudson (NZL)
Chen Jianjun (CHN)

Gold medal game

31 August 2018
20:00

Japan	2–1	India
Shimizu 11'; Kawamura 44'	Report	Goyal 25'

Umpires:
Kelly Hudson (NZL)
Liu Xiaoying (CHN)

== Football ==
Japan men's team were drawn in group D, while the women's team in group C.

Summary

Team	Event	Group stage				Round of 16	Quarterfinal	Semifinal	Final / BM	
Team	Event	Opposition Score	Opposition Score	Opposition Score	Rank	Opposition Score	Opposition Score	Opposition Score	Opposition Score	Rank
Japan men's	Men's tournament	Nepal; W 1–0	Pakistan; W 4–0	Vietnam; L 0-1	2 Q	Malaysia; W 1–0	Saudi Arabia; W 2–1	United Arab Emirates; W 1–0	South Korea; L 1-2	2nd place, silver medalist(s)
Japan women's	Women's tournament	—N/a	Thailand; W 2–0	Vietnam; W 7–0	1 Q	—N/a	North Korea; W 2–1	South Korea; W 2–1	China; W 1–0	1st place, gold medalist(s)

=== Men's tournament ===
Roster

The following is the Japan squad in the men's football tournament of the 2018 Asian Games. The team of 20 players was officially named on 3 August. Kakeru Funaki was initially called up, but had to pull out due to injury, with Takuma Ominami being called up to replace him.

Head coach: (Japan) Hajime Moriyasu

No.	Pos.	Player	Date of birth (age)	Club
1	GK	Ryosuke Kojima	30 January 1997 (aged 21)	(Japan Football Association) Waseda University
12	GK	Powell Obinna Obi	18 December 1997 (aged 20)	(Japan Football Association) Ryutsu Keizai University
3	DF	Makoto Okazaki	10 October 1998 (aged 19)	(Japan Football Association) FC Tokyo
4	MF	Ko Itakura	27 January 1997 (aged 21)	(Japan Football Association) Vegalta Sendai
5	DF	Daiki Sugioka	8 September 1998 (aged 19)	(Japan Football Association) Shonan Bellmare
7	DF	Teruki Hara	30 July 1998 (aged 20)	(Japan Football Association) Albirex Niigata
19	DF	Takuma Ominami	13 December 1997 (aged 20)	(Japan Football Association) Júbilo Iwata
20	DF	Yugo Tatsuta	21 June 1998 (aged 20)	(Japan Football Association) Shimizu S-Pulse
2	MF	Yoichi Naganuma	14 April 1997 (aged 21)	(Japan Football Association) Montedio Yamagata
6	MF	Ryo Hatsuse	10 July 1997 (aged 21)	(Japan Football Association) Gamba Osaka
8	MF	Kaoru Mitoma	20 May 1997 (aged 21)	(Japan Football Association) University of Tsukuba
10	MF	Koji Miyoshi	26 March 1997 (aged 21)	(Japan Football Association) Kawasaki Frontale
11	MF	Keita Endo	22 November 1997 (aged 20)	(Japan Football Association) Yokohama F. Marinos
13	MF	Yuto Iwasaki	11 June 1998 (aged 20)	(Japan Football Association) Kyoto Sanga
14	MF	Taishi Matsumoto	22 August 1998 (aged 19)	(Japan Football Association) Sanfrecce Hiroshima
16	MF	Kota Watanabe	18 October 1998 (aged 19)	(Japan Football Association) Tokyo Verdy
17	MF	Yuta Kamiya	24 April 1997 (aged 21)	(Japan Football Association) Ehime FC
9	FW	Reo Hatate	21 November 1997 (aged 20)	(Japan Football Association) Juntendo University
15	FW	Ayase Ueda	28 August 1998 (aged 19)	(Japan Football Association) Hosei University
18	FW	Daizen Maeda	20 October 1997 (aged 20)	(Japan Football Association) Matsumoto Yamaga

* Over-aged player.

Group D

Pos	Team	Pld	W	D	L	GF	GA	GD	Pts	Qualification
1	Vietnam	3	3	0	0	6	0	+6	9	Advance to knockout stage
2	Japan	3	2	0	1	5	1	+4	6	Advance to knockout stage
3	Pakistan	3	1	0	2	2	8	−6	3	
4	Nepal	3	0	0	3	1	5	−4	0	

Source: Asian Games 2018
Rules for classification: Group stage tiebreakers
14 August 2018
19:00 UTC+7

Japan	1–0	Nepal
Mitoma 7'	Report

Wibawa Mukti Stadium, Cikarang
Referee: Sultan Al-Marzooqi (United Arab Emirates)

16 August 2018
16:00 UTC+7

Pakistan	0–4	Japan
	Report	Iwasaki 2', 35'; Hatate 9'; Maeda 10'

Wibawa Mukti Stadium, Cikarang
Referee: Ammar Mahfoodh (Bahrain)

19 August 2018
16:00 UTC+7

Japan	0–1	Vietnam
	Report	Nguyễn Quang Hải 3'

Wibawa Mukti Stadium, Cikarang
Referee: Lau Fong Hei (Hong Kong)

Round of 16

24 August 2018
19:30 UTC+7

Malaysia	0–1	Japan
	Report	Ueda 90' (pen.)

Patriot Candrabhaga Stadium, Bekasi
Referee: Bijan Heidari (Iran)

Quarter-final

27 August 2018
16:00 UTC+7

Saudi Arabia	1–2	Japan
Tatsuta 39' (o.g.)	Report	Iwasaki 31', 73'

Pakansari Stadium, Cibinong
Referee: Timur Faizullin (Kyrgyzstan)

Semi-final

29 August 2018
19:30 UTC+7

Japan	1–0	United Arab Emirates
Ueda 78'	Report

Pakansari Stadium, Cibinong
Referee: Yu Ming-hsun (Chinese Taipei)

Gold medal game

1 September 2018
18:30 UTC+7

South Korea	2–1 (a.e.t.)	Japan
Lee Seung-woo 93'; Hwang Hee-chan 101'	Report	Ueda 115'

Pakansari Stadium, Cibinong
Referee: Aziz Asimov (Uzbekistan)

=== Women's tournament ===
Roster

The following is the Japan squad in the women's football tournament of the 2018 Asian Games.

Head coach: (Japan) Asako Takakura

No.	Pos.	Player	Date of birth (age)	Caps	Goals	Club
1	GK	Sakiko Ikeda	8 September 1992 (aged 25)	13	0	(Japan Football Association) Urawa Red Diamonds
18	GK	Ayaka Yamashita	29 September 1995 (aged 22)	20	0	(Japan Football Association) NTV Beleza
2	DF	Risa Shimizu	15 June 1996 (aged 22)	13	0	(Japan Football Association) NTV Beleza
3	DF	Aya Sameshima	16 June 1987 (aged 31)	96	5	(Japan Football Association) INAC Kobe Leonessa
4	DF	Shiori Miyake	13 October 1995 (aged 22)	12	0	(Japan Football Association) INAC Kobe Leonessa
5	DF	Hikari Takagi	21 May 1993 (aged 25)	18	1	(Japan Football Association) Nojima Stella Kanagawa Sagamihara
6	DF	Saori Ariyoshi	1 November 1987 (aged 30)	58	1	(Japan Football Association) NTV Beleza
17	DF	Aimi Kunitake	10 January 1997 (aged 21)	1	0	(Japan Football Association) Nojima Stella Kanagawa Sagamihara
7	MF	Emi Nakajima	27 September 1990 (aged 27)	59	12	(Japan Football Association) INAC Kobe Leonessa
10	MF	Yuka Momiki	9 April 1996 (aged 22)	15	3	(Japan Football Association) NTV Beleza
12	MF	Rika Masuya	14 September 1995 (aged 22)	25	5	(Japan Football Association) INAC Kobe Leonessa
13	MF	Yu Nakasato	14 July 1994 (aged 24)	18	0	(Japan Football Association) NTV Beleza
14	MF	Yui Hasegawa	29 January 1997 (aged 21)	25	3	(Japan Football Association) NTV Beleza
15	MF	Moeno Sakaguchi	4 June 1992 (aged 26)	4	1	(Japan Football Association) Albirex Niigata
16	MF	Rin Sumida	12 January 1996 (aged 22)	17	0	(Japan Football Association) NTV Beleza
8	FW	Mana Iwabuchi	18 March 1993 (aged 25)	56	16	(Japan Football Association) INAC Kobe Leonessa
9	FW	Yuika Sugasawa	5 October 1990 (aged 27)	54	13	(Japan Football Association) Urawa Red Diamonds
11	FW	Mina Tanaka	28 April 1994 (aged 24)	30	12	(Japan Football Association) NTV Beleza

Group C

Pos	Team	Pld	W	D	L	GF	GA	GD	Pts	Qualification
1	Japan	2	2	0	0	9	0	+9	6	Advance to Knockout stage
2	Vietnam	2	1	0	1	3	9	−6	3	Advance to Knockout stage
3	Thailand	2	0	0	2	2	5	−3	0	Advance to Knockout stage

Source: Asian Games 2018
Rules for classification: Group stage tiebreakers
16 August 2018
18:30 UTC+7

Thailand	0–2	Japan
	Report	Iwabuchi 33'; Momiki 85'

Bumi Sriwijaya Stadium, Palembang
Referee: Mi Siyu (China)

21 August 2018
15:00 UTC+7

Japan	7–0	Vietnam
Sugasawa 5', 77'; Momiki 17'; Nakajima 38'; Tanaka 52', 88'; Masuya 64'	Report

Gelora Sriwijaya Stadium, Palembang
Referee: Thein Thein Aye (Myanmar)

Quarter-final

25 August 2018
16:00 UTC+7

Japan	2–1	North Korea
Iwabuchi 40'; Hasegawa 62'	Report	Kim Nam-hui 71' (pen.)

Gelora Sriwijaya Stadium, Palembang
Referee: Mahsa Ghorbani (Iran)

Semi-final

28 August 2018
16:00 UTC+7

South Korea	1–2	Japan
Lee Min-a 68'	Report	Sugasawa 5'; Lim Seon-joo 86' (o.g.)

Gelora Sriwijaya Stadium, Palembang
Referee: Law Bik Chi (Hong Kong)

Gold medal game

31 August 2018
18:30 UTC+7

Japan	1–0	China
Sugasawa 90'	Report

Gelora Sriwijaya Stadium, Palembang
Referee: Oh Hyeon-jeong (South Korea)

== Golf ==
Men

Athlete	Event	Round 1	Round 2	Round 3	Round 4	Total		
Athlete	Event	Score	Score	Score	Score	Score	Par	Rank
Keita Nakajima	Individual	68	68	70	71	277	−11	1st place, gold medalist(s)
Ren Yonezawa	Individual	70	71	74	71	286	−2	13
Daiki Imano	Individual	73	68	69	74	284	−4	8
Takumi Kanaya	Individual	70	70	73	68	281	−7	4
Keita Nakajima; Ren Yonezawa; Daiki Imano; Takumi Kanaya	Team	208	206	212	210	836	–28	1st place, gold medalist(s)

Women

Athlete	Event	Round 1	Round 2	Round 3	Round 4	Total		
Athlete	Event	Score	Score	Score	Score	Score	Par	Rank
Sae Ogura	Individual	69	72	77	76	294	+6	20
Riri Sadoyama	Individual	69	72	73	78	292	+4	17
Ayaka Furue	Individual	67	70	74	68	279	−9	4
Sae Ogura; Riri Sadoyama; Ayaka Furue	Team	136	142	147	144	569	−7	5

== Handball ==
Japan men's and women's team were drawn in group B respectively.

Summary

Key:

- ET – After extra time
- P – Match decided by penalty-shootout.

Team	Event	Preliminary	Standing	Main / Class.	Rank / standing	Semifinals / Pl.	Final / BM / Pl.	
Team	Event	Opposition score	Standing	Opposition score	Rank / standing	Opposition score	Opposition score	Rank
Japan men's	Men's tournament	Group B Pakistan: W 38–15; South Korea: D 26–26	2 Q	Group I Saudi Arabia: D 26–26; Iraq: W 27–24; Qatar: L 24–17	2 Q	Bahrain; L 20–31	South Korea; L 23–24	4
Japan women's	Women's tournament	Group B Thailand: W 41–16; Hong Kong: W 41–13; Malaysia: W 64–3; Indonesia: W 62–6	1 Q	—N/a		China; L 31–32	Thailand; W 43–14	3rd place, bronze medalist(s)

=== Men's tournament ===
Roster

- Hozuki Higashinagahama
- Kenya Kasahara
- Akihito Kai
- Kohei Narita
- Jin Watanabe
- Motoki Sakai
- Hiroki Shida
- Hiroki Motoki
- Hiroyasu Tamakawa
- Kairi Kochi
- Tatsuki Yoshino
- Yuto Agarie
- Naohiro Hamaguchi
- Daichi Komuro
- Tetsuya Kadoyama

Group B

Pos	Team	Pld	W	D	L	GF	GA	GD	Pts	Qualification
1	South Korea	2	1	1	0	73	42	+31	3 (Note: Head-to-head result: KOR 26–26 JPN. Overall goal difference was used as the tiebreaker.)	Main round / Group 1–2
2	Japan	2	1	1	0	64	41	+23	3	Main round / Group 1–2
3	Pakistan	2	0	0	2	31	85	−54	0	Main round / Group 3

Source: AHF
Notes:

15 August; 14:00	Japan	38–15	Pakistan	POPKI Sports Hall, Jakarta; Referees: Al-Wahibi, Al-Shahi (OMA)
15 August; 14:00	Shida 7	(20–7)	M. Hussain 5	POPKI Sports Hall, Jakarta; Referees: Al-Wahibi, Al-Shahi (OMA)
15 August; 14:00	3× (yellow card) 2× (suspension)		2× (yellow card) 1× (suspension)	POPKI Sports Hall, Jakarta; Referees: Al-Wahibi, Al-Shahi (OMA)

17 August; 9:00	South Korea	26–26	Japan	POPKI Sports Hall, Jakarta; Referees: Al-Marhoon, Al-Mawt (BHR)
17 August; 9:00	Kim 10	(13–13)	Motoki, Agarie 6	POPKI Sports Hall, Jakarta; Referees: Al-Marhoon, Al-Mawt (BHR)
17 August; 9:00	3× (yellow card) 5× (suspension)		3× (yellow card) 5× (suspension)	POPKI Sports Hall, Jakarta; Referees: Al-Marhoon, Al-Mawt (BHR)

Main round (Group I)

Pos	Team	Pld	W	D	L	GF	GA	GD	Pts	Qualification
1	Qatar	3	3	0	0	78	60	+18	6	Semifinals
2	Japan	3	1	1	1	70	74	−4	3	Semifinals
3	Saudi Arabia	3	0	2	1	69	74	−5	2	Classification 5th–6th
4	Iraq	3	0	1	2	64	73	−9	1	Classification 7th–8th

Source: AHF

20 August; 20:00	Saudi Arabia	26–26	Japan	POPKI Sports Hall, Jakarta; Referees: Al-Marhoon, Al-Mawt (BHR)
20 August; 20:00	Al-Abbas 8	(15–11)	Agarie 7	POPKI Sports Hall, Jakarta; Referees: Al-Marhoon, Al-Mawt (BHR)
20 August; 20:00	3× (yellow card) 3× (suspension) 1× (red card)		3× (yellow card) 4× (suspension)	POPKI Sports Hall, Jakarta; Referees: Al-Marhoon, Al-Mawt (BHR)

22 August; 16:00	Japan	27–24	Iraq	POPKI Sports Hall, Jakarta; Referees: Tavakkoli, Valadkhanian (IRI)
22 August; 16:00	Motoki 9	(12–15)	Adnan 5	POPKI Sports Hall, Jakarta; Referees: Tavakkoli, Valadkhanian (IRI)
22 August; 16:00	1× (yellow card) 2× (suspension)		3× (yellow card) 8× (suspension) 1× (red card)	POPKI Sports Hall, Jakarta; Referees: Tavakkoli, Valadkhanian (IRI)

24 August; 20:00	Qatar	24–17	Japan	POPKI Sports Hall, Jakarta; Referees: Shakir, Kadhim (IRQ)
24 August; 20:00	Zouaoui 6	(13–10)	Higashinagahama 6	POPKI Sports Hall, Jakarta; Referees: Shakir, Kadhim (IRQ)
24 August; 20:00	1× (yellow card) 5× (suspension)		2× (yellow card) 4× (suspension)	POPKI Sports Hall, Jakarta; Referees: Shakir, Kadhim (IRQ)

Semifinal

27 August; 18:00	Bahrain	31–20	Japan	POPKI Sports Hall, Jakarta; Referees: Tavakkoli, Valadkhanian (IRI)
27 August; 18:00	Al-Sayyad 10	(15–9)	Watanabe 7	POPKI Sports Hall, Jakarta; Referees: Tavakkoli, Valadkhanian (IRI)
27 August; 18:00	2× (yellow card) 4× (suspension)		2× (yellow card) 1× (suspension)	POPKI Sports Hall, Jakarta; Referees: Tavakkoli, Valadkhanian (IRI)

Bronze medal game

31 August; 16:00	South Korea	24–23	Japan	POPKI Sports Hall, Jakarta; Referees: Al-Marhoon, Al-Mawt (BHR)
31 August; 16:00	Hwang 6	(13–12)	Watanabe, Agarie 5	POPKI Sports Hall, Jakarta; Referees: Al-Marhoon, Al-Mawt (BHR)
31 August; 16:00	3× (yellow card)		3× (yellow card) 2× (suspension)	POPKI Sports Hall, Jakarta; Referees: Al-Marhoon, Al-Mawt (BHR)

=== Women's tournament ===
Roster

- Kimiko Hida
- Mika Nagata
- Kaho Sunami
- Sayo Shiota
- Asuka Fujita
- Aya Yokoshima
- Minami Itano
- Chie Katsuren
- Hitomi Tada
- Natsumi Akiyama
- Nozomi Hara
- Mana Ohyama
- Shiori Nagata
- Miyuki Terada
- Tomomi Kawata
- Mayuko Ishitate

Group B

Pos	Team	Pld	W	D	L	GF	GA	GD	Pts	Qualification
1	Japan	4	4	0	0	208	38	+170	8	Semifinals
2	Thailand	4	3	0	1	120	93	+27	6	Semifinals
3	Hong Kong	4	2	0	2	112	97	+15	4	Classification 5th–8th
4	Indonesia	4	1	0	3	56	146	−90	2	Classification 5th–8th
5	Malaysia	4	0	0	4	45	167	−122	0	Classification 9th–10th

Source: AHF

14 August; 14:00	Thailand	16–41	Japan	POPKI Sports Hall, Jakarta; Referees: Tavakkoli, Valadkhanian (IRI)
14 August; 14:00	Bunjarern 7	(6–23)	Akiyama 8	POPKI Sports Hall, Jakarta; Referees: Tavakkoli, Valadkhanian (IRI)
14 August; 14:00	4× (yellow card) 2× (suspension)		3× (yellow card) 4× (suspension)	POPKI Sports Hall, Jakarta; Referees: Tavakkoli, Valadkhanian (IRI)

16 August; 14:00	Hong Kong	13–41	Japan	POPKI Sports Hall, Jakarta; Referees: Tavakkoli, Valadkhanian (IRI)
16 August; 14:00	Cheung M. 6	(5–18)	Fujita, Akiyama 6	POPKI Sports Hall, Jakarta; Referees: Tavakkoli, Valadkhanian (IRI)
16 August; 14:00	2× (yellow card) 4× (suspension)		3× (yellow card) 2× (suspension)	POPKI Sports Hall, Jakarta; Referees: Tavakkoli, Valadkhanian (IRI)

19 August; 14:00	Japan	64–3	Malaysia	POPKI Sports Hall, Jakarta; Referees: Li, Ke (CHN)
19 August; 14:00	Kawata 10	(32–2)	Yusop 2	POPKI Sports Hall, Jakarta; Referees: Li, Ke (CHN)
19 August; 14:00			2× (suspension)	POPKI Sports Hall, Jakarta; Referees: Li, Ke (CHN)

23 August; 18:00	Indonesia	6–62	Japan	POPKI Sports Hall, Jakarta; Referees: Lee, Lee (KOR)
23 August; 18:00	Apriliani 4	(4–34)	Kawata 11	POPKI Sports Hall, Jakarta; Referees: Lee, Lee (KOR)
23 August; 18:00	1× (yellow card) 6× (suspension)		2× (yellow card)	POPKI Sports Hall, Jakarta; Referees: Lee, Lee (KOR)

Semifinal

27 August; 16:00	Japan	31–32	China	POPKI Sports Hall, Jakarta; Referees: Al-Wahibi, Al-Shahi (OMA)
27 August; 16:00	Yokoshima, Akiyama 6	(15–13)	Liu 11	POPKI Sports Hall, Jakarta; Referees: Al-Wahibi, Al-Shahi (OMA)
27 August; 16:00	2× (yellow card) 2× (suspension)		2× (yellow card)	POPKI Sports Hall, Jakarta; Referees: Al-Wahibi, Al-Shahi (OMA)

Bronze medal game

30 August; 16:00	Thailand	14–43	Japan	POPKI Sports Hall, Jakarta; Referees: Lee, Lee (KOR)
30 August; 16:00	Bunjarern 6	(6–20)	Fujita, Akiyama, Kawata 6	POPKI Sports Hall, Jakarta; Referees: Lee, Lee (KOR)
30 August; 16:00	2× (yellow card) 5× (suspension)		3× (yellow card) 2× (suspension)	POPKI Sports Hall, Jakarta; Referees: Lee, Lee (KOR)

== Judo ==
All Japan Judo Federation delegate 14 judokas (7 men's and 7 women's) to compete at the Games.

Key:

- 1st number — Ippon
- 2nd number — Waza-ari
- H — Hansuke-make
- s — Shido

Men

Athlete	Event	Round of 32	Round of 16	Quarterfinals	Semifinals	Repechage	Final / BM	Rank
Athlete	Event	Opposition Result	Opposition Result	Opposition Result	Opposition Result	Opposition Result	Opposition Result	Rank
Toru Shishime	–60 kg	Bye	PK Phok (CAM); W 11–00	Shang Y (CHN); W 10–00s2	An J-y (PRK); W 01–00s1	—N/a	D Urozboev (UZB); L 00s1–01s1	2nd place, silver medalist(s)
Joshiro Maruyama	–66 kg	Bye	Wu ZQ (CHN); W 10–00	A Te (KGZ); W 10s1–00s3	Y Zhumakanov (KAZ); W 10s1–00	—N/a	An B-u (KOR); L 00–10	2nd place, silver medalist(s)
Shohei Ono	–73 kg	Bye	Qing DG (CHN); W 10–00	Kim C-g (PRK); W 10–00s1	V Scvortov (UAE); W 10–00	—N/a	An C-r (KOR); W 01s2–00s2	1st place, gold medalist(s)
Takeshi Sasaki	–81 kg	Bye	MZ Sarwari (AFG); W 10–00	S Boltaboev (UZB); W 10s1–00	D Khamza (KAZ); L 01–10	Bye	V Zoloev (KGZ); L 00–10s1	–
Mashu Baker	–90 kg	Bye	F Bulekulov (KGZ); W 10–00s3	I Bozbayev (KAZ); W 10s1–00s3	Gwak D-h (KOR); L 00s3–10s1	Bye	S Sabirov (UZB); W 10s1–00s1	3rd place, bronze medalist(s)
Kentaro Iida	–100 kg	Bye	Li HL (CHN); W 10–00	B Hojamuhammedov (TKM); W 10–00s1	L Otgonbaatar (MGL); W 10–00s3	—N/a	Cho G-h (KOR); W 10s1–00s3	1st place, gold medalist(s)
Takeshi Ojitani	+100 kg	—N/a	Bye	B Oltiboev (UZB); W 11s2–00s1	Kim S-m (KOR); L 00H–10	Bye	S Mirmamadov (TJK); L 00–10	–

Women

Athlete	Event	Round of 32	Round of 16	Quarterfinals	Semifinals	Repechage	Final / BM	Rank
Athlete	Event	Opposition Result	Opposition Result	Opposition Result	Opposition Result	Opposition Result	Opposition Result	Rank
Ami Kondo	–48 kg	—N/a	Bye	D Keldiyorova (UZB); W 10–00	G Otgontsetseg (KAZ); W 10s1–00	—N/a	Jeong B-k (KOR); L 00s1–01	2nd place, silver medalist(s)
Natsumi Tsunoda	–52 kg	Bye	D Khadka (NEP); W 10–00s3	Chen C-y (TPE); W 10–00	Rim S-s (PRK); W 10–00	—N/a	Park D-s (KOR); W 11–00	1st place, gold medalist(s)
Momo Tamaoki	–57 kg	Bye	Y Warasiha (THA); W 10–00	Kim J-d (KOR); W 10–00	Lu TJ (CHN); W 10–00	—N/a	Kim J-a (PRK); W 10–01	1st place, gold medalist(s)
Nami Nabekura	–63 kg	—N/a	Bye	AY Fradivtha (INA); W 10–00	Tang J (CHN); W 10–00	—N/a	K Watanabe (PHI); W 10–00	1st place, gold medalist(s)
Saki Niizoe	–70 kg	—N/a	Bye	Zhu Y (CHN); W 10–00	Z Bektaskyzy (KAZ); W 10–00	—N/a	Kim S-y (KOR); W 01s1–00	1st place, gold medalist(s)
Ruika Sato	–78 kg	—N/a	Bye	K Chanthakoummane (LAO); W 10–00	Ma ZZ (CHN); W 10–00s3	—N/a	Park Y-j (KOR); W 10s1–00s2	1st place, gold medalist(s)
Akira Sone	+78 kg	—N/a	Bye	R Kaur (IND); W 10–00s1	G Issanova (KAZ); W 10s1–00s3	—N/a	Kim M-j (KOR); W 01s1–00s2	1st place, gold medalist(s)

Mixed

Athlete	Event	Round of 16	Quarterfinals	Semifinals	Repechage	Final / BM	Rank
Athlete	Event	Opposition Result	Opposition Result	Opposition Result	Opposition Result	Opposition Result	Rank
Mashu Baker; Masashi Ebinuma; Haruka Funakubo; Kokoro Kageura; Yusuke Kobayashi; Saki Niizoe; Takeshi Ojitani; Shohei Ono; Akira Sone; Momo Tamaoki; Shiho Tanaka; Sara Yamamoto	Team	Bye	South Korea (KOR); W 3^{30}–3^{21}	China (CHN); W 4–0	—N/a	Kazakhstan (KAZ); W 4–0	1st place, gold medalist(s)

== Kabaddi ==
Summary

Team	Event	Group stage						Semifinal	Final	
Team	Event	Opposition score	Opposition score	Opposition score	Opposition score	Opposition score	Rank	Opposition score	Opposition score	Rank
Japan men's	Men	Iran; L 20−55	Malaysia; W 30−20	Indonesia; L 26−34	Nepal; W 31−28	Pakistan; L 14−25	4	Did not advance		7
Japan women's	Women	India; L 12−34	Indonesia; L 22−30	Sri Lanka; L 17−22	Thailand; L 12−43	—N/a	5	Did not advance		9

=== Men's tournament ===
Team roster

- Masayuki Shimokawa
- Takamitsu Kono
- Terukazu Nitta
- Kazuhiro Takano
- Tetsuro Abe
- Etsuki Manita
- Masaki Hatakeyama
- Yuten Kawate
- Takuya Kikuchi
- Tetsuya Itagaki

Group B

Pos	Team	Pld	W	D	L	PF	PA	PD	Pts	Qualification
1	Iran	5	5	0	0	289	109	+180	10	Semifinals
2	Pakistan	5	4	0	1	185	98	+87	8	Semifinals
3	Indonesia	5	3	0	2	132	182	−50	6	
4	Japan	5	2	0	3	121	162	−41	4	
5	Nepal	5	1	0	4	127	194	−67	2	
6	Malaysia	5	0	0	5	100	209	−109	0	

Source: OCA

=== Women's tournament ===
Team roster

- Yoko Ota
- Eri Kasahara
- Miho Echizenya
- Yumi Kaneko
- Minami Ito
- Yukiko Hayafuji
- Mayuko Ito
- Haru Inoue
- Serina Takahashi
- Chiharu Midorikawa

Group A

Pos	Team	Pld	W	D	L	PF	PA	PD	Pts	Qualification
1	India	4	4	0	0	168	69	+99	8	Semifinals
2	Thailand	4	3	0	1	142	75	+67	6	Semifinals
3	Sri Lanka	4	2	0	2	83	113	−30	4	
4	Indonesia	4	1	0	3	84	145	−61	2	
5	Japan	4	0	0	4	63	138	−75	0	

Source: OCA

== Kurash ==
Men

Athlete	Event	Round of 32	Round of 16	Quarterfinal	Semifinal	Final	
Athlete	Event	Opposition Score	Opposition Score	Opposition Score	Opposition Score	Opposition Score	Rank
Kohei Soeda	–81 kg	H Al-Jarrah (YEM); W 012−001	O Tiztak (IRI); L 000−013	Did not advance			
Tatsumi Kawaguchi	+90 kg	Nguyễn CHL (VIE); W 101−001	M Khisomiddinov (UZB); L 000−100	Did not advance			

== Modern pentathlon ==
Japan entered four pentathletes (2 men's and 2 women's) at the Games.

Athlete	Event	Swimming (200 m freestyle)		Fencing (épée one touch)		Riding (show jumping)		Laser-run (shooting 10 m air pistol/ running 3200 m)		Total points	Final rank
Athlete	Event	Rank	MP points	Rank	MP points	Rank	MP points	Rank	MP points	Total points	Final rank
Shohei Iwamoto	Men's	6	305	7	202	8	280	7	580	1367	8
Tomoyuki Ono	Men's	5	311	4	226	4	298	8	571	1406	6
Rena Shimazu	Women's	2	291	11	181	3	293	6	518	1283	4
Natsumi Tomonaga	Women's	4	287	5	226	7	234	5	525	1272	5

== Paragliding ==
Men

Athlete	Event	Round										Total	Rank
Athlete	Event	1	2	3	4	5	6	7	8	9	10	Total	Rank
Yoshiaki Hirokawa	Individual accuracy	13	~~500~~	20	5	3	31	500	22	284	4	882	17
Yoshiki Kuremoto	Individual accuracy	20	169	9	1	6	206	~~244~~	13	2	134	387	9
Yoshiaki Hirokawa; Takuo Iwasaki; Taro Kamiyama; Yoshiki Kuremoto; Yoshiaki Nakagawa	Team accuracy	870	1133	146	466	1373	981	—N/a				4969	9
Yoshiaki Hirokawa; Takuo Iwasaki; Taro Kamiyama; Yoshiki Kuremoto; Yoshiaki Nakagawa	Cross-country	2024	741	3296	3273	2057	—N/a					11391	1st place, gold medalist(s)

Women

Athlete	Event	Round										Total	Rank
Athlete	Event	1	2	3	4	5	6	7	8	9	10	Total	Rank
Keiko Hiraki	Individual accuracy	~~500~~	500	468	16	21	132	208	21	65	10	1450	8
Atsuko Yamashita	Individual accuracy	60	~~500~~	500	500	76	118	500	128	500	6	2388	12
Keiko Hiraki; Nao Mochizuki; Atsuko Yamashita	Team accuracy	1060	1500	1016	1016	597	372	—N/a				5561	5
Keiko Hiraki; Nao Mochizuki; Atsuko Yamashita	Cross-country	644	405	1891	1079	832	—N/a					4851	2nd place, silver medalist(s)

== Pencak silat ==
Seni

Athlete	Event	Preliminary		Final	
Athlete	Event	Result	Rank	Result	Rank
Daisuke Aso	Men's tunggal	442	5	Did not advance	

== Roller sports ==
=== Skateboarding ===
Athlete	Event	Preliminary		Final	
Athlete	Event	Result	Rank	Result	Rank
Kensuke Sasaoka	Men's park	83.66	1 Q	76.00	1st place, gold medalist(s)
Keyaki Ike	Men's street	28.3	2 Q	31.1	1st place, gold medalist(s)
Kensuke Sasaoka	Men's street	19.9	10	Did not advance	
Kaya Isa	Women's park	—N/a		58.33	2nd place, silver medalist(s)
Sakura Yosozumi	Women's park	—N/a		66.66	1st place, gold medalist(s)
Kaya Isa	Women's street	—N/a		25.0	2nd place, silver medalist(s)

== Rowing ==
Men

Athlete	Event	Heats		Repechage		Final	
Athlete	Event	Time	Rank	Time	Rank	Time	Rank
Ryuta Arakawa	Single sculls	7:56.08	1 FA	Bye		7:35.29	3rd place, bronze medalist(s)
Keita Yamao; Tomokazu Kuribara	Double sculls	7:12.70	2 FA	Bye		7:01.26	6
Yoshihiro Otsuka; Yuta Takano	Coxless pair	7:38.78	4 FA	—N/a		7:10.53	3rd place, bronze medalist(s)
Masayuki Miyaura; Masahiro Takeda	Lightweight double sculls	6:53.25	1 FA	Bye		7:01.17	1st place, gold medalist(s)

Women

Athlete	Event	Heats		Repechage		Final	
Athlete	Event	Time	Rank	Time	Rank	Time	Rank
Haruna Sakakibara	Single sculls	8:50.25	2 R	8:40.21	1 FA	8:25.74	4
Sayaka Chujo; Shiho Yonekawa	Double sculls	8:17.81	4 FA	—N/a		7:51.05	4
Kana Nishihara; Akiho Takano	Coxless pair	8:25.11	2 FA	Bye		8:07.93	4
Miharu Takashima; Hinako Takimoto	Lightweight double sculls	7:59.22	3 FA	—N/a		7:57.15	4

== Rugby sevens ==
Japan rugby sevens men's and women's team entered the group B at the Games.

Team	Event	Group stage				Quarterfinal	Semifinal / Pl.	Final / BM / Pl.	
Team	Event	Opposition score	Opposition score	Opposition score	Rank	Opposition score	Opposition score	Opposition score	Rank
Japan men's	Men's tournament	Indonesia; W 92–0	Malaysia; W 47–0	Chinese Taipei; W 31–0	1 Q	Chinese Taipei; W 43–0	Sri Lanka; W 12–10	Hong Kong; L 0–14	2nd place, silver medalist(s)
Japan women's	Women's tournament	Indonesia; W 65–0	Kazakhstan; W 31–21	Thailand; W 26–0	1 Q	South Korea; W 35–7	Kazakhstan; W 26–12	China; W 7–5	1st place, gold medalist(s)

=== Men's tournament ===
Squad

The following is the Japan squad in the men's rugby sevens tournament of the 2018 Asian Games. The team of 12 players was officially named by the Japan Rugby Football Union.

- Hashino Kosuke
- Taisei Hayashi
- Kano Ryota
- Chihito Matsui
- Naoki Motomura
- Rikiya Oishi
- Dai Ozawa (Captain)
- Katsuyuki Sakai
- Kameli Soejima
- Tevitangongokilitoto Tupou
- Lote Tuqiri
- Taichi Yoshizawa

Group B

Pos	Team	Pld	W	D	L	PF	PA	PD	Pts	Qualification
1	Japan	3	3	0	0	170	0	+170	9	Quarterfinals
2	Malaysia	3	2	0	1	56	62	−6	7	Quarterfinals
3	Chinese Taipei	3	1	0	2	51	74	−23	5	Quarterfinals
4	Indonesia	3	0	0	3	31	172	−141	3	Ranking round 9–12

Source: Results

30 August
13:34

Japan	92–0	Indonesia
Try: Matsui (3) 1' m, 5' c, 7' m Ozawa (2) 2' c, 3' c Motomura (3) 2' c, 6' c, 9' c Sakai 7+' c Oishi (2) 10' m, 11' c Kano 12' c Hayashi 14' c Tuqiri 14+' c Con: Sakai (11/14)

Gelora Bung Karno Rugby Field, Jakarta
Referee: Patrick Kwok (Hong Kong)

30 August
17:14

Japan	47–0	Malaysia
Try: Hashino (2) 2' c, 12' c Hayashi 6' c Sakai (2) 7' c, 14' m Ozawa 9' c Kano 13' c Con: Sakai (5/6); Hashino (1/1)

Gelora Bung Karno Rugby Field, Jakarta
Referee: Charlie Brown (Ireland)

31 August
13:56

Japan	31–0	Chinese Taipei
Try: Shin 1' m Motomura (3) 3' c, 7' m, 13' c Kano 10' c Con: Hashino (1/3); Sakai (2/2)

Gelora Bung Karno Rugby Field, Jakarta
Referee: Matthew Rodden (New Zealand)

Quarterfinal

31 August
17:14

Japan	43–0	Chinese Taipei
Try: Matsui (2) 1' m, 4' c Hashino 6' m Soejima 8' c Ozawa (3) 10' c, 12' c, 14' m Con: Sakai (4/7)

Gelora Bung Karno Rugby Field, Jakarta
Referee: Patrick Kwok (Hong Kong)

Semifinal

1 September
16:56

Japan	12–10	Sri Lanka
Try: Hashino 4' m Sakai 7+' c Con: Sakai (1/2)		Try: Perera 2' m Muthuthanthri 7' m Con: Sooriyabandara (0/2)

Gelora Bung Karno Rugby Field, Jakarta
Referee: Matthew Rodden (New Zealand)

Gold medal game

1 September
21:06

Japan	0–14	Hong Kong
		Try: Yiu 2' c Nardoni 7+' c Con: Rimene (2/2)

Gelora Bung Karno Rugby Field, Jakarta
Referee: Matthew Rodden (New Zealand)

=== Women's tournament ===
Squad

The following is the Japan squad in the women's rugby sevens tournament of the 2018 Asian Games. The team of 12 players was officially named by the Japan Rugby Football Union.

- Padivakalolo Laityelmiyo
- Yume Hirano
- Kozasa Tomomi
- Ano Kuwai
- Nagata Iroha
- Chiharu Nakamura (Captain)
- Yume Okuroda
- Fumiko Otake
- Sayaka Suzuki
- Emii Tanaka
- Noriko Taniguchi
- Yukari Tateyama

Group B

Pos	Team	Pld	W	D	L	PF	PA	PD	Pts	Qualification
1	Japan	3	3	0	0	122	21	+101	9	Quarterfinals
2	Kazakhstan	3	2	0	1	95	36	+59	7	Quarterfinals
3	Thailand	3	1	0	2	58	51	+7	5	Quarterfinals
4	Indonesia	3	0	0	3	5	172	−167	3	Quarterfinals

Source: Results

30 August
11:44

Japan	65–0	Indonesia
Try: Otake 2' m Tanaka 4' m Hirano 6' c Nagata (2) 7' m, 7+' m Bativakalolo 8' m Nakamura 9' c Okuroda 10' c Taniguchi 12' c Kurogi (2) 13' c, 14+' m Con: Okuroda (5/9); Nagata (0/1); Bativakalolo (0/1)

Gelora Bung Karno Rugby Field, Jakarta
Referee: Phoenix Xu (China)

30 August
15:46

Japan	31–21	Kazakhstan
Try: Otake 2' c Okuroda 6' c Hirano 7+' m Nagata 8' c Kozasa 11' m Con: Otake (1/1); Okuroda (2/4)		Try: Korotkikh (2) 4' c, 12' c Nurmatova 9' c Con: Baktybayeva (3/3)

Gelora Bung Karno Rugby Field, Jakarta
Referee: Charlie Brown (Ireland)

31 August
11:14

Japan	26–0	Thailand
Try: Hirano (2) 5' c, 9' m Nakamura 12' c Kurogi 14' c Con: Okuroda (3/4)

Gelora Bung Karno Rugby Field, Jakarta
Referee: Phoenix Xu (China)

Quarterfinal

31 August
16:08

South Korea	7–35	Japan
Try: Lim 11' c Con: Lee (1/1)		Try: Kurogi (2) 2' m, 10' m Taniguchi 4' m Bativakalolo 5' m Kuwai 7+' m Tanaka 13' m Nakamura 14+' m Con: Tanaka (0/5); Okuroda (0/2)

Gelora Bung Karno Rugby Field, Jakarta
Referee: Phoenix Xu (China)

Semifinal

1 September
15:50

Kazakhstan	12–26	Japan
Try: Korotkikh (2) 7' m, 12' c Con: Baktybayeva (0/1); Nurmatova (1/1)		Try: Otake (2) 2' m, 7+' c Okuroda 5' c Penalty try 14' m Con: Okuroda (2/3)

Gelora Bung Karno Rugby Field, Jakarta
Referee: Craig Chan (Canada)

Gold medal game

1 September
20:40

China	5–7	Japan
Try: Chen K. 9' m Con: Chen K. (0/1)		Try: Hirano 6' c Con: Okuroda (1/1)

Gelora Bung Karno Rugby Field, Jakarta
Referee: Patrick Kwok (Hong Kong)

== Sailing ==
Men

Athlete	Event	Race															Total	Rank
Athlete	Event	1	2	3	4	5	6	7	8	9	10	11	12	13	14	15	Total	Rank
Makoto Tomizawa	RS:X	2	4	3	3	3	3	4	4	5	4	3	3	7	5	~~(11)~~; DNC	53	4
Kazumasa Segawa	Laser	5	3	5	5	4	6	4	5	~~(8)~~	8	6	2	—N/a			53	4
Shingen Furuya; Shinji Hachiyama	49er	3	3	1	2	2	1	3	1	2	4	3	6	6	2	~~(10)~~; DNC	39	1st place, gold medalist(s)
Tetsuya Isozaki; Akira Takayanagi	470	1	2	1	1	1	2	1	1	1	4	~~(12)~~; DSQ	2	—N/a			17	1st place, gold medalist(s)

Women

Athlete	Event	Race															Total	Rank
Athlete	Event	1	2	3	4	5	6	7	8	9	10	11	12	13	14	15	Total	Rank
Megumi Komine	RS:X	~~(6)~~	6	5	4	5	4	5	5	4	5	5	4	6	5	5	68	5
Manami Doi	Laser Radial	1	2	1	1	1	2	1	1	1	1	1	~~(11)~~; DNC	—N/a			13	1st place, gold medalist(s)
Ai Yoshida; Miho Yoshioka	470	1	1	1	1	1	1	1	1	1	2	~~(8)~~; OCS	1	—N/a			12	1st place, gold medalist(s)

Mixed

Athlete	Event	Race															Total	Rank
Athlete	Event	1	2	3	4	5	6	7	8	9	10	11	12	13	14	15	Total	Rank
Kaiyo Maeda	Laser 4.7	~~(24)~~; DSQ	8	3	2	10	3	4	12	9	8	12	8	—N/a			79	5
Lisa Nukui	Laser 4.7	15	13	15	13	13	16	15	3	8	4	~~(17)~~	17	—N/a			132	13

== Sambo ==
Key:

- SU – Won by submission.

Athlete	Event	Round of 32	Round of 16	Quarterfinal	Semifinal	Repechage 1	Repechage 2	Repechage final	Final / BM	
Athlete	Event	Opposition Result	Opposition Result	Opposition Result	Opposition Result	Opposition Result	Opposition Result	Opposition Result	Opposition Result	Rank
Kota Yamamoto	Men's 52 kg	Bye	G Gurtgeldiýew (TKM); W 3–1	B Ibragim (KAZ); L 0–2^{SU}	Did not advance	Bye	G Mönkhbat (MGL); W ^{Dsq}	I Akhmedjanov (UZB); L 0–0^{SU}	Did not advance	
Yosuke Sato	Men's 90 kg	S Azar (LBN); W 3–1	K Kholmamatov (UZB); L 0–7	Did not advance		Bye	I Amirkhani (IRI); L 0–4	Did not advance		
Natsuki Tomi	Women's 68 kg	Bye	S Somching (THA); W 9–0	D Kuryshbayeva (KAZ); L 0–1	Did not advance	Bye	A Estebesova (KGZ); W 4^{SU}–0	G Ismatova (UZB); W 2–0	D Kudarova (KAZ); W 8–1	3rd place, bronze medalist(s)

== Sepak takraw ==
Men

Athlete	Event	Group stage					Semifinal	Final	
Athlete	Event	Opposition Score	Opposition Score	Opposition Score	Opposition Score	Rank	Opposition Score	Opposition Score	Rank
Yuki Sato; Seiya Takano; Takeshi Terashima; Toshitaka Naito; Hirokazu Kobayashi; Masanori Hayashi	Quadrant	Indonesia (INA); L 0–2	Laos (LAO); W 2–1	Myanmar (MYA); W 2–1	China (CHN); W 2–0	2 Q	Vietnam (VIE); W 2–0	Indonesia (INA); L 1–2	2nd place, silver medalist(s)
Yuki Sato; Seiya Takano; Takeshi Terashima; Toshitaka Naito; Ryo Masuda; Tsubasa Sato; Masahiro Yamada; Hirokazu Kobayashi; Masanori Hayashi	Team doubles	Indonesia (INA); W 2–1	Vietnam (VIE); L 1–2	Philippines (PHI); W 2–1	—N/a	2 Q	Thailand (THA); L 0–2	Did not advance	3rd place, bronze medalist(s)

Women

Athlete	Event	Group stage					Semifinal	Final	
Athlete	Event	Opposition Score	Opposition Score	Opposition Score	Opposition Score	Rank	Opposition Score	Opposition Score	Rank
Chiharu Yano; Sawa Aoki; Satomi Ishihara; Yuumi Kawamata; Naoko Nakatsuka; Azusa Kikuchi	Quadrant	India (IND); W 2–0	Malaysia (MAS); L 0–2	Thailand (THA); L 0–2	Vietnam (VIE); L 1–2	4	Did not advance		
Nagisa Makio; Sawa Aoki; Chiharu Yano; Satomi Ishihara; Yuumi Kawamata; Naoko Nakatsuka; Chinatsu Saegusa; Yuri Tanaka; Azusa Kikuchi	Team regu	Indonesia (INA); L 0–3	Vietnam (VIE); L 1–2	Malaysia (MAS); L 0–3	Myanmar (MYA); L 0–3	5	Did not advance		

== Shooting ==
Men

Athlete	Event	Qualification		Final	
Athlete	Event	Points	Rank	Points	Rank
Tomoyuki Matsuda	10 m air pistol	581	4 Q	239.7	2nd place, silver medalist(s)
Yoshinobu Sonoda	10 m air pistol	575	12	Did not advance	
Teruyoshi Akiyama	25 m rapid fire pistol	568	13	Did not advance	
Naoya Okada	10 m air rifle	623.3	11	Did not advance	
Atsushi Shimada	10 m air rifle	621.0	15	Did not advance	
Takayuki Matsumoto	50 m rifle three positions	1163	6 Q	441.4	3rd place, bronze medalist(s)
Toshikazu Yamashita	50 m rifle three positions	1151	15	Did not advance	
Yokouchi Makoto	Skeet	107	25	Did not advance	
Kenji Orihara	Skeet	120	11	Did not advance	

Women

Athlete	Event	Qualification		Final	
Athlete	Event	Points	Rank	Points	Rank
Akiko Sato	10 m air pistol	569	11	Did not advance	
Satoko Yamada	10 m air pistol	549	33	Did not advance	
Yukari Konishi	25 m pistol	579	10	Did not advance	
Akiko Sato	25 m pistol	578	13	Did not advance	
Maki Konomoto	10 m air rifle	609.3	35	Did not advance	
Ayano Shimizu	10 m air rifle	620.1	16	Did not advance	
Ayano Shimizu	50 m rifle three positions	1156	11	Did not advance	
Mai Toishi	50 m rifle three positions	1148	16	Did not advance	
Yukie Nakayama	Trap	106	20	Did not advance	
Naoko Ishihara	Skeet	114	7	Did not advance	
Rika Orihara	Skeet	107	14	Did not advance	

Mixed team

Athlete	Event	Qualification		Final	
Athlete	Event	Points	Rank	Points	Rank
Tomoyuki Matsuda; Akiko Sato	10 m air pistol	766	3 Q	362.2	4
Atsushi Shimada; Ayano Shimizu	10 m air rifle	823.3	8	Did not advance	

== Soft tennis ==
Athlete	Event	Group stage				Quarterfinals	Semifinals	Final	
Athlete	Event	Opposition score	Opposition score	Opposition score	Rank	Opposition score	Opposition score	Opposition score	Rank
Hayato Funemizu	Men's singles	M Yahya (PAK); W 4–0	Kim J-w (KOR); L 0–4	—N/a	2	Did not advance			
Koichi Nagae	Men's singles	P Inthalangsy (LAO); W 4–0	Trần VC (VIE); W 4–0	Chen Y-h (TPE); W 4–3	1 Q	Kim D-h (KOR); L 0–4	Did not advance		
Kurumi Onoue	Women's singles	P Champamanivong (LAO); W 4–0	Kim Y-h (KOR); W 4–2	—N/a	1 Q	Chen C-l (TPE); L 0–4	Did not advance		
Noa Takahashi	Women's singles	S Kraiya (THA); W 4–0	Lee C-w (TPE); W 4–0	—N/a	1 Q	Kim J-y (KOR); W 4–3	Yu YY (CHN); W 4–0	Cheng C-l (TPE); W 4–3	1st place, gold medalist(s)
Kento Masuda; Rurika Kuroki	Mixed doubles	E Bolortuya / N Bulgan (MGL); W 5–2	MA Ehtisham / SEB Zaidi (PAK); W 5–0	—N/a	1 Q	Yu K-w / Cheng C-l (TPE); L 2–5	Did not advance		
Toshiki Uematsu; Riko Hayashida	Mixed doubles	D Altankhuyag / A Munguntsetseg (MGL); W 5–0^{R}	N Seth / AC Patel (IND); W 5–0	—N/a	1 Q	C Leampriboon / T Bunteng (THA); W 5–0	Kim K-s / Mun H-g (KOR); L 3–5	Did not advance	3rd place, bronze medalist(s)
Hayato Funemizu; Toshiki Uematsu; Taimei Marunaka; Koichi Nagae; Kento Masuda	Men's team	Indonesia (INA); W 3–0	Cambodia (CAM); W 3–0	India (IND); W 3–0	1 Q	Bye	Chinese Taipei (TPE); W 2–0	South Korea (KOR); L 0–2	2nd place, silver medalist(s)
Riko Hayashida; Misaki Hangai; Noa Takahashi; Rurika Kuroki; Kurumi Onoue	Women's team	Indonesia (INA); W 3–0	Pakistan (PAK); W 3–0	—N/a	1 Q	Bye	Chinese Taipei (TPE); W 2–0	South Korea (KOR); W 2–1	1st place, gold medalist(s)

== Softball ==
Summary

Team	Event	Group stage		Semifinal	Bronze medal game	Final	
Team	Event	Opposition Score	Rank	Opposition Score	Opposition Score	Opposition Score	Rank
Japan women's	Women's tournament	Indonesia: W 7–0; Chinese Taipei: W 3–1; Hong Kong: W 14–0; Philippines: W 11–1; South Korea: W 10–0; China: W 14–1	1 Q	China; W 5–0	Bye	Chinese Taipei; W 7–0	1st place, gold medalist(s)

Roster

- Haruka Agatsuma
- Mana Atsumi
- Yamato Fujita
- Yukari Hamamura
- Nodoka Harada
- Yuka Ichiguchi
- Kyoko Ishikawa
- Hitomi Kawabata
- Misato Kawano
- Nozomi Nagasaki
- Minori Naito
- Natsuko Sugama
- Yukiko Ueno
- Eri Yamada
- Yu Yamamoto
- Saori Yamauchi
- Saki Yamazaki

Preliminary round

Final round
Eliminated

The top four teams will advance to the Final round.

Team	W	L	RS	RA	WIN%	GB	Tiebreaker
Japan	6	0	59	3	1.000	–	
China	4	2	30	16	0.667	2	1–1; RA = 1
Philippines	4	2	20	17	0.667	2	1–1; RA = 3
Chinese Taipei	4	2	27	13	0.667	2	1–1; RA = 7
South Korea	2	4	15	23	0.333	4	
Indonesia	1	5	15	41	0.167	5	
Hong Kong	0	6	2	55	0.000	6	

August 19; 17:30	Indonesia	0–7	Japan	GBK Softball field
August 19; 17:30		Boxscore		GBK Softball field

August 20; 10:00	Chinese Taipei	1–3	Japan	GBK Softball field
August 20; 10:00		Boxscore		GBK Softball field

August 21; 12:30	Hong Kong	0–14	Japan	GBK Softball field
August 21; 12:30		Boxscore		GBK Softball field

August 21; 17:30	Philippines	1–11	Japan	GBK Softball field
August 21; 17:30		Boxscore		GBK Softball field

August 22; 10:00	Japan	10–0	South Korea	GBK Softball field
August 22; 10:00		Boxscore		GBK Softball field

August 22; 17:30	Japan	14–1	China	GBK Softball field
August 22; 17:30		Boxscore		GBK Softball field

Semifinal

August 23 15:00 at GBK Softball field
Team	1	2	3	4	5	6	7	R	H	E
China	0	0	0	0	0	0	0	0	2	1
Japan	1	2	2	0	0	0	X	5	9	0
WP: Yamato Fujita LP: Zhao Xinxing; Boxscore

Final

August 24 15:00 at GBK Softball field
Team	1	2	3	4	5	6	7	R	H	E
Chinese Taipei	0	0	0	0	0	X	X	0	1	1
Japan	3	4	0	0	X	X	X	7	5	0
WP: Yukiko Ueno LP: Tu Yating; Boxscore

== Sport climbing ==
Speed

Athlete	Event	Qualification		Round of 16	Quarterfinals	Semifinals	Final / BM	
Athlete	Event	Best	Rank	Opposition Time	Opposition Time	Opposition Time	Opposition Time	Rank
Kokoro Fujii	Men's	9.557	23	Did not advance				
Tomoa Narasaki	Men's	7.260	12 Q	Lee S-b (KOR); L 6.830–6.512	Did not advance			10
Akiyo Noguchi	Women's	11.488	17	Did not advance				
Futaba Ito	Women's	10.110	10 Q	Lee H-y (TPE); L 10.366–9.347	Did not advance			9

Combined

Athlete	Event	Qualification					Final				
Athlete	Event	Speed Point	Boulder Point	Lead Point	Total	Rank	Speed Point	Boulder Point	Lead Point	Total	Rank
Kokoro Fujii	Men's	17	6	2	204	4 Q	5	3	1	15	2nd place, silver medalist(s)
Tomoa Narasaki	Men's	6	1	1	6	1 Q	4	2	2	16	3rd place, bronze medalist(s)
Akiyo Noguchi	Women's	11	3.5	2	77	3 Q	6	1	2	12	1st place, gold medalist(s)
Futaba Ito	Women's	9	7	4	252	6 Q	4	2	4	32	4

== Squash ==
Singles

Athlete	Event	Round of 32	Round of 16	Quarterfinals	Semifinals	Final	
Athlete	Event	Opposition score	Opposition score	Opposition score	Opposition score	Opposition score	Rank
Tomotaka Endo	Men's	L Au (HKG); L 0–3	Did not advance				
Ryunosuke Tsukue	Men's	P Poonsiri (THA); W 3–0	A Al-Tamimi (QAT); L 1–3	Did not advance			
Misaki Kobayashi	Women's	Gu JY (CHN); W 3–0	Choi Y-r (KOR); W 3–2	D P Karthik (IND); L 0–3	Did not advance		
Satomi Watanabe	Women's	F Issadeen (SRI); W 3–0	F Eghtedari (IRI); W 3–0	N David (MAS); L 0–3	Did not advance		

Team

Athlete	Event	Group stage						Semifinal	Final	
Athlete	Event	Opposition Score	Opposition Score	Opposition Score	Opposition Score	Opposition Score	Rank	Opposition Score	Opposition Score	Rank
Ryunosuke Tsukue; Tomotaka Endo; Ryosei Kobayashi	Men's	Pakistan (PAK); L 1–2	Hong Kong (HKG); L 0–3	Nepal (NEP); W 3–0	South Korea (KOR); W 3–0	Philippines (PHI); W 3–0	3	Did not advance		
Satomi Watanabe; Misaki Kobayashi; Risa Sugimoto	Women's	Philippines (PHI); W 3–0	Pakistan (PAK); W 3–0	Malaysia (MAS); L 0–3	South Korea (KOR); W 2–1	—N/a	2 Q	Hong Kong (HKG); L 0–2	Did not advance	3rd place, bronze medalist(s)

== Swimming ==
=== Men ===
Athlete	Event	Heats		Final	
Athlete	Event	Time	Rank	Time	Rank
Naito Ehara	200 m freestyle	1:47.76	3Q	1:47.66	5
Naito Ehara	400 m freestyle	3:53.24	5Q	3:47.14	2nd place, silver medalist(s)
Kosuke Hagino	400 m freestyle	3:50.67	2Q	3:47.20	3rd place, bronze medalist(s)
Kosuke Hagino	200 m individual medley	1:59.76	1Q	1:56.75	2nd place, silver medalist(s)
Kosuke Hagino	400 m individual medley	4:16.17	2Q	4:10.30	2nd place, silver medalist(s)
Ayatsugu Hirai	1500 m freestyle	—N/a		15:24.26	5
Nao Horomura	100 m butterfly	53.30	8Q	53.00	6
Nao Horomura	200 m butterfly	1:58.06	2Q	1:55.58	2nd place, silver medalist(s)
Ryosuke Irie	50 m backstroke	25.25	3Q	24.88	2nd place, silver medalist(s)
Ryosuke Irie	100 m backstroke	53.85	2Q	52.53	2nd place, silver medalist(s)
Ryosuke Irie	200 m backstroke	2:01.74	3Q	1:55.11	2nd place, silver medalist(s)
Masaki Kaneko	50 m backstroke	26.23	12	Did not advance	
Masaki Kaneko	100 m backstroke	54.81	4Q	54.61	4
Yuki Kobori	50 m butterfly	24.17	7Q	24.40	7
Yuki Kobori	100 m butterfly	52.47	2Q	51.77	3rd place, bronze medalist(s)
Yasuhiro Koseki	50 m breaststroke	27.28	2Q	27.07	1st place, gold medalist(s)
Yasuhiro Koseki	100 m breaststroke	1:01.35	7Q	58.86	1st place, gold medalist(s)
Yasuhiro Koseki	200 m breaststroke	2:12.77	3Q	2:07.81	1st place, gold medalist(s)
Katsuhiro Matsumoto	200 m freestyle	1:47.94	4Q	1:46.50	2nd place, silver medalist(s)
Katsumi Nakamura	50 m freestyle	22.50	4Q	22.20	2nd place, silver medalist(s)
Katsumi Nakamura	100 m freestyle	49.50	5Q	48.72	2nd place, silver medalist(s)
Shunichi Nakao	50 m freestyle	22.62	7Q	22.46	3rd place, bronze medalist(s)
Shunichi Nakao	50 m butterfly	23.98	4Q	23.88	4
Daiya Seto	50 m breaststroke	27.97	7Q	28.00	8
Daiya Seto	200 m butterfly	1:57.23	1Q	1:54.53	1st place, gold medalist(s)
Daiya Seto	200 m individual medley	2:01.57	4Q	2:01.57	4
Daiya Seto	400 m individual medley	4:16.16	1Q	4:08.79	1st place, gold medalist(s)
Shinri Shioura	100 m freestyle	49.32	3Q	48.71	1st place, gold medalist(s)
Keita Sunama	200 m backstroke	2:02.64	5Q	1:55.54	3rd place, bronze medalist(s)
Shogo Takeda	800 m freestyle	—N/a		7:53.01	2nd place, silver medalist(s)
Shogo Takeda	1500 m freestyle	—N/a		15:17.13	4
Ippei Watanabe	100 m breaststroke	1:00.93	4Q	1:00.15	4
Ippei Watanabe	200 m breaststroke	2:11.92	1Q	2:07.82	2nd place, silver medalist(s)
Kohei Yamamoto	800 m freestyle	—N/a		7:59.60	4
Shinri Shioura; Katsuhiro Matsumoto; Katsumi Nakamura; Juran Mizohata	4 × 100 m freestyle relay	3:18.25	2Q	3:12.68	1st place, gold medalist(s)
Naito Ehara; Reo Sakata; Kosuke Hagino; Katsuhiro Matsumoto; Juran Mizohata^{[b]} Ayatsugu Hirai^{[b]} Yuki Kobori^{[b]}	4 × 200 m freestyle relay	7:25.73	4Q	7:05.17	1st place, gold medalist(s)
Ryosuke Irie; Yasuhiro Koseki; Yuki Kobari; Shinri Shioura; Masaki Kaneko^{[b]} Ippei Watanabe^{[b]} Nao Horomura^{[b]} Katsumi Nakamura^{[b]}	4 × 100 m medley relay	3:36.95	1Q	3:30.03	2nd place, silver medalist(s)

^{b} Swimmers who participated in the heats only and received medals.

=== Women ===
Athlete	Event	Heats		Final	
Athlete	Event	Time	Rank	Time	Rank
Sayaka Akase	200 m backstroke	2:12.25	4Q	2:10.35	4
Reona Aoki	100 m breaststroke	1:07.24	2Q	1:06.45	2nd place, silver medalist(s)
Reona Aoki	200 m breaststroke	2:29.16	3Q	2:23.33	3rd place, bronze medalist(s)
Tomomi Aoki	100 m freestyle	55.57	3Q	54.58	4
Suzuka Hasegawa	200 m butterfly	2:09.95	1Q	2:08.80	3rd place, bronze medalist(s)
Chihiro Igarashi	200 m freestyle	2:00.21	1Q	1:57.49	3rd place, bronze medalist(s)
Chihiro Igarashi	400 m freestyle	4:15.89	1Q	4:08.48	3rd place, bronze medalist(s)
Rikako Ikee	50 m freestyle	25.09	1Q	24.53	1st place, gold medalist(s)
Rikako Ikee	100 m freestyle	54.33	1Q	53.27	1st place, gold medalist(s)
Rikako Ikee	50 m butterfly	25.91	1Q	25.55	1st place, gold medalist(s)
Rikako Ikee	100 m butterfly	57.81	2Q	56.30	1st place, gold medalist(s)
Waka Kobori	400 m freestyle	4:19.62	3Q	4:11.69	4
Waka Kobori	800 m freestyle	—N/a		8:30.65	3rd place, bronze medalist(s)
Waka Kobori	1500 m freestyle	—N/a		16:18.31	3rd place, bronze medalist(s)
Anna Konishi	50 m backstroke	28.69	4Q	28.37	4
Anna Konishi	100 m backstroke	1:00.44	1Q	59.67	2nd place, silver medalist(s)
Sachi Mochida	200 m butterfly	2:11.87	3Q	2:08.72	2nd place, silver medalist(s)
Yukimi Moriyama	800 m freestyle	—N/a		8:40.71	4
Yukimi Moriyama	1500 m freestyle	—N/a		16:34.23	4
Natsumi Sakai	50 m backstroke	28.25	3Q	27.91	3rd place, bronze medalist(s)
Natsumi Sakai	100 m backstroke	1:00.53	2Q	59.27	1st place, gold medalist(s)
Natsumi Sakai	200 m backstroke	2:12.30	5Q	2:08.13	2nd place, silver medalist(s)
Sakiko Shimizu	400 m individual medley	4:45.88	3Q	4:39.10	3rd place, bronze medalist(s)
Ai Soma	50 m butterfly	27.40	11	Did not advance	
Ai Soma	100 m butterfly	59.16	4Q	58.68	4
Satomi Suzuki	50 m breaststroke	31.02	1Q	30.83	1st place, gold medalist(s)
Satomi Suzuki	100 m breaststroke	1:06.92	1Q	1:06.40	1st place, gold medalist(s)
Miho Teramura	50 m breaststroke	31.26	3Q	Disqualified	
Miho Teramura	200 m individual medley	2:15.73	3Q	2:10.98	3rd place, bronze medalist(s)
Yui Ohashi	200 m freestyle	2:02.41	5Q	2:00.29	4
Yui Ohashi	200 m individual medley	2:13.55	1Q	2:08.88	2nd place, silver medalist(s)
Yui Ohashi	400 m individual medley	4:42.11	1Q	4:34.58	1st place, gold medalist(s)
Kanako Watanabe	200 m breaststroke	2:27.05	1Q	2:23.05	1st place, gold medalist(s)
Mayuka Yamamoto	50 m freestyle	25.53	4Q	25.45	4
Rikako Ikee; Natsumi Sakai; Tomomi Aoki; Chihiro Igarashi; Mayuka Yamamoto^{[b]} Rio Shirai^{[b]}	4 × 100 m freestyle relay	3:42.47	2Q	3:36.52	1st place, gold medalist(s)
Chihiro Igarashi; Rikako Ikee; Yui Ohashi; Rio Shirai; Waka Kobori^{[b]} Sachi Mochida^{[b]}	4 × 200 m freestyle relay	8:05.21	2Q	7:53.83	2nd place, silver medalist(s)
Natsumi Sakai; Reona Aoki; Rikako Ikee; Tomomi Aoki; Anna Konishi^{[b]} Reona Aoki^{[b]} Ai Soma^{[b]} Sakiko Shimizu^{[b]}	4 × 100 m medley relay	4:01.65	1Q	3:54.73	1st place, gold medalist(s)

^{b} Swimmers who participated in the heats only and received medals.

=== Mixed ===
Athlete	Event	Heats		Final	
Athlete	Event	Time	Rank	Time	Rank
Ryosuke Irie; Yasuhiro Koseki; Rikako Ikee; Tomomi Aoki; Masaki Kaneko^{[b]} Ippei Watanabe^{[b]} Mayuka Yamamoto^{[b]}	4 × 100 m mixed medley relay	3:48.89	1Q	3:41.21	2nd place, silver medalist(s)

^{b} Swimmers who participated in the heats only and received medals.

== Table tennis ==
Individual

Athlete	Event	Round 1	Round 2	Round of 16	Quarterfinals	Semifinals	Final	
Athlete	Event	Opposition score	Opposition score	Opposition score	Opposition score	Opposition score	Opposition score	Rank
Jin Ueda	Men's singles	Bye	S Wisutmaythangkoon (THA); W 4–1	N Alamian (IRI); W 4–1	Fan ZD (IRI); L 0–4	Did not advance		
Kenta Matsudaira	Men's singles	Bye	Choe I (PRK); W 4–1	S Gnanasekaran (IND); W 4–1	Lin GY (CHN); L 2–4	Did not advance		
Minami Ando	Women's singles	Bye	Nguyễn TN (VIE); W 4–1	Cheng I-c (TPE); L 2–4	Did not advance			
Miyu Kato	Women's singles	Bye	K Nur Hawwa (INA); W 4–0	Kim S-i (PRK); W 4–3	Jeon J-h (KOR); L 3–4	Did not advance		
Jin Ueda; Miyu Maeda	Mixed doubles	Bye	M Rameez / F Khan (PAK); W 3–0	Wang CQ / Sun YS (CHN); L 0–3	Did not advance			
Masataka Morizono; Misaki Morizono	Mixed doubles	Bye	Leong CF / Ho Y (MAS); W 3–1	Lim J-h / Yang H-e (KOR); L 1–3	Did not advance			

Team

Athlete	Event	Group stage					Quarterfinal	Semifinal	Final	
Athlete	Event	Opposition Score	Opposition Score	Opposition Score	Opposition Score	Rank	Opposition Score	Opposition Score	Opposition Score	Rank
Kenta Matsudaira; Masataka Morizono; Jin Ueda; Masaki Yoshida	Men's	Maldives (MDV); W 3–0	Thailand (THA); W 3–0	Iran (IRI); W 3–1	Kyrgyzstan (KGZ); W 3–0	1 Q	India (IND); L 1–3	Did not advance		
Minami Ando; Miyu Kato; Misaki Morizono; Miyu Maeda	Women's	Thailand (THA); W 3–0	North Korea (PRK); L 2–3	Mongolia (MGL); W 3–0	—N/a	2 Q	China (CHN); L 0–3	Did not advance		

== Taekwondo ==
Poomsae

Athlete	Event	Round of 16	Quarterfinal	Semifinal	Final	
Athlete	Event	Opposition Score	Opposition Score	Opposition Score	Opposition Score	Rank
Mana Umehara	Women's individual	K Philavong (LAO); W 7.68–7.53	M Salahshouri (IRI); L 7.99–8.27	Did not advance		

Kyorugi

Athlete	Event	Round of 32	Round of 16	Quarterfinal	Semifinal	Final	
Athlete	Event	Opposition Score	Opposition Score	Opposition Score	Opposition Score	Opposition Score	Rank
Sergio Suzuki	Men's −58 kg	Bye	T Kuangmany (LAO); W 50–28	A Asiri (KSA); W 22–8	Kim T-h (KOR); L 11–24	Did not advance	3rd place, bronze medalist(s)
Masanojo Honma	Men's −63 kg	C Liyanage (SRI); L 18–21	Did not advance				
Hidenori Ebata	Men's −80 kg	D A Prayogo (INA); W 24–20	S El-Sharabaty (JOR); L 8–28	Did not advance			
Miyu Yamada	Women's 49 kg	Bye	Trương T K T (VIE); W 35–27	K Wijerathna (SRI); W 32–8	M Mannopova (UZB); L 11–14	Did not advance	3rd place, bronze medalist(s)
Kiyoko Nagano	Women's −53 kg	Bye	Su P-y (TPE); L 6–26	Did not advance			

== Tennis ==
Men

Athlete	Event	Round of 64	Round of 32	Round of 16	Quarterfinals	Semifinals	Final	
Athlete	Event	Opposition score	Opposition score	Opposition score	Opposition score	Opposition score	Opposition score	Rank
Yasutaka Uchiyama	Singles	Bye	S Dissanayake (SRI); W 6–3, 6–1	Wu YB (CHN); L 3–6, 6–7^{(6–8)}	Did not advance			
Yosuke Watanuki	Singles	Bye	S Khaledan (IRI); W 6–1, 6–3	A Bublik (KAZ); L 6–7^{(5–7)}, 4–6	Did not advance			
Sho Shimabukuro; Kaito Uesugi	Doubles	Bye	Lý NH / Nguyễn PV (VIE); W 6–2, 4–6, [10–2]	T Khabibulin / A Nedovyesov (KAZ); W 7–6^{(7–4)}, 6–3	Gong MX / Zhang Z (CHN); W 4–6, 6–2, [10–2]	R Bopanna / D Sharan (IND); L 6–4, 3–6, [8–10]	Did not advance	3rd place, bronze medalist(s)
Yuya Ito; Yosuke Watanuki	Doubles	Bye	J Barki / C Rungkat (INA); W 6–4, 3–6, [10–7]	Wong C-h / Yeung P-l (HKG); W 6–4, 6–4	Hong S-c / Lee J-m (KOR); W 6–3, 5–7, [10–2]	A Bublik / D Yevseyev (KAZ); L 4–6, 7–6^{(7–4)}, [7–10]	Did not advance	3rd place, bronze medalist(s)

Women

Athlete	Event	Round of 64	Round of 32	Round of 16	Quarterfinals	Semifinals	Final	
Athlete	Event	Opposition score	Opposition score	Opposition score	Opposition score	Opposition score	Opposition score	Rank
Eri Hozumi	Singles	Bye	M Capadocia (PHI); W 6–1, 6–3	A Raina (IND); L 1–6, 2–6	Did not advance			
Miyu Kato	Singles	Bye	TMA Kurera (SRI); W 6–0, 6–1	A Sutjiadi (INA); L 1–6, 0–6	Did not advance			
Erina Hayashi; Moyuka Uchijima	Doubles	—N/a	B Gumulya / J Rompies (INA); W 1–6, 6–4, [11–9]	Mah Rana / May Rana (NEP); W 6–0, 6–0	Chan H-c / L Chan (TPE); L 6–4, 5–7, [5–10]	Did not advance		
Miyu Kato; Makoto Ninomiya	Doubles	—N/a	Bye	S Sharipova / I Tulyaganova (UZB); W 6–3, 6–3	Han N-l / Kim N-r (KOR); W 6–3, 6–3	Xu YF / Yang ZX (CHN); L 4–6, 2–6	Did not advance	3rd place, bronze medalist(s)

Mixed

Athlete	Event	Round of 64	Round of 32	Round of 16	Quarterfinals	Semifinals	Final	
Athlete	Event	Opposition score	Opposition score	Opposition score	Opposition score	Opposition score	Opposition score	Rank
Erina Hayashi; Kaito Uesugi	Doubles	Bye	J Altansarnai / G Batjargal (MGL); W 6–1, 6–0	Chang K-c / Hsieh C-p (TPE); W 7–6^{(7–2)}, 6–7^{(5–7)}, [12–10]	Xu YF / Zhang Z (CHN); W 7–6^{(7–4)}, 0–6, [10–8]	A Sutjiadi / C Rungkat (INA); L 6–7^{(3–7)}, 4–6	Did not advance	3rd place, bronze medalist(s)
Makoto Ninomiya; Yasutaka Uchiyama	Doubles	Bye	Choi J-h / Kim Y-s (KOR); W 7–5, 6–7^{(7–9)}, [10–6]	Liang E-s / Peng H-y (TPE); W 6–4, 6–4	A Danilina / A Nedovyesov (KAZ); L 1–6, 4–6	Did not advance		

== Triathlon ==
Individual

Athlete	Event	Swim (1.5 km)	Trans 1	Bike (39.6 km)	Trans 2	Run (10 km)	Total Time	Rank
Jumpei Furuya	Men's	18:48	0:26	56:36	0:20	33:33	1:49:43	1st place, gold medalist(s)
Makoto Odakura	Men's	18:47	0:27	56:38	0:23	37:19	1:53:34	7
Yuka Sato	Women's	19:13	0:28	1:03:09	0:23		DNF	–
Yuko Takahashi	Women's	19:02	0:29	1:00:33	0:24	39:01	1:59:29	1st place, gold medalist(s)

Mixed relay

Athletes	Event	Total Times per Athlete (Swim 300 m, Bike 6.3 km, Run 2.1 km)	Total Group Time	Rank
Jumpei Furuya; Yuichi Hosoda; Yuka Sato; Yuko Takahashi	Mixed relay	21:33; 22:04; 23:26; 23:36	1:30:39	1st place, gold medalist(s)

== Volleyball ==
=== Beach volleyball ===
Athlete	Event	Preliminary		Round of 16	Quarterfinals	Semifinals	Final / BM	
Athlete	Event	Oppositions scores	Rank	Opposition score	Opposition score	Opposition score	Opposition score	Rank
Yuya Ageba; Katsuhiro Shiratori	Men's tournament	Pham – Nguyen (VIE): W 2–0; Wu – Aboduhalikejiang (CHN): L 0–2; Alikhail – Mayar (AFG): W 2–0	2 Q	Vakili – Salemiinjehboroun (IRI); L 0–2	Did not advance			
Yoshiumi Hasegawa; Keisuke Shimizu	Men's tournament	Nguyen – Ly (VIE): W 2–0; Mirzaali – Raoufi (IRI): L 1–2; I F Xavier – R F Xavier (TLS): W 2–0	2 Q	Wu – Aboduhalikejiang (CHN); L 1–2	Did not advance			
Miki Ishii; Megumi Murakami	Women's tournament	Tran – Truong (VIE): W 2–0; Wang – Zeng (CHN): W 2–0; Yu – Pan (TPE): W 2–0	1 Q	Bye	Radarong – Udomchavee (THA); W 2–0	Mashkova – Tsimbalova (KAZ); W 2–0	Wang – Xia (CHN); L 1–2	2nd place, silver medalist(s)
Azusa Futami; Akiko Hasegawa	Women's tournament	Numwong – Hongpak (THA): W 2–0; Ratnasari – Eka (INA): W 2–1; Caminha – de Sousa (TLS):W 2–0; Rachenko – Yeropkina (KAZ): W 2–0	1 Q	Bye	Juliana – Utami (INA); L 0–2	Did not advance		

=== Indoor volleyball ===
Team	Event	Group stage		Playoffs	Quarterfinals	Semifinals / Pl.	Final / BM / Pl.	
Team	Event	Oppositions scores	Rank	Opposition score	Opposition score	Opposition score	Opposition score	Rank
Japan men's	Men's tournament	Kazakhstan: W 3–2; Myanmar: W 3–2	1 Q	India; W 3–1	Qatar; L 2–3	Did not advance	Indonesia; W 3–2	5
Japan women's	Women's tournament	Indonesia: W 3–0; Philippines: W 3–0; Thailand: L 0–3; Hong Kong: W 3–0	2 Q	—N/a	Kazakhstan; W 3–0	China; L 0–3	South Korea; L 1–3	4

==== Men's tournament ====
Team roster

The following is the Japanese roster in the men's volleyball tournament of the 2018 Asian Games.

Head coach: (United States) Gordon Mayforth

No.	Name	Date of birth	Height	Weight	Spike	Block	Club
2	Hideomi Fukatsu (c)	1 June 1990	1.80 m (5 ft 11 in)	70 kg (150 lb)	327 cm (129 in)	305 cm (120 in)	(Japan) Panasonic Panthers
3	Shunichiro Sato	17 May 2000	2.04 m (6 ft 8 in)	94 kg (207 lb)	335 cm (132 in)	320 cm (130 in)	(Japan) Tohoku High School
4	Naoya Takano	30 April 1993	1.90 m (6 ft 3 in)	78 kg (172 lb)	335 cm (132 in)	320 cm (130 in)	(Japan) Sakai Blazers
5	Jin Tsuzuki	28 December 1998	1.94 m (6 ft 4 in)	85 kg (187 lb)	340 cm (130 in)	320 cm (130 in)	(Japan) Chuo University
7	Takashi Dekita	13 August 1991	2.00 m (6 ft 7 in)	94 kg (207 lb)	345 cm (136 in)	330 cm (130 in)	(Japan) Sakai Blazers
8	Hiroki Ozawa	21 September 1997	1.86 m (6 ft 1 in)	82 kg (181 lb)	340 cm (130 in)	315 cm (124 in)	(Japan) University of Tsukuba
10	Shunsuke Chijiki	6 September 1989	1.94 m (6 ft 4 in)	89 kg (196 lb)	348 cm (137 in)	325 cm (128 in)	(Japan) Sakai Blazers
11	Ryota Denda	3 July 1991	1.91 m (6 ft 3 in)	84 kg (185 lb)	345 cm (136 in)	327 cm (129 in)	(Japan) Toyoda Gosei Trefuerza
12	Takuya Takamatsu	8 January 1988	1.86 m (6 ft 1 in)	86 kg (190 lb)	341 cm (134 in)	320 cm (130 in)	(Japan) Toyoda Gosei Trefuerza
13	Motoki Eiro	8 June 1998	1.92 m (6 ft 4 in)	80 kg (180 lb)	329 cm (130 in)	320 cm (130 in)	(Japan) Tokai University
14	Tomohiro Horie	23 June 1997	1.83 m (6 ft 0 in)	73 kg (161 lb)	315 cm (124 in)	305 cm (120 in)	(Japan) Waseda University
17	Ryuta Homma	17 October 1991	1.78 m (5 ft 10 in)	71 kg (157 lb)	320 cm (130 in)	305 cm (120 in)	(Japan) JTEKT Stings
18	Takeshi Ogawa	7 July 1994	1.93 m (6 ft 4 in)	90 kg (200 lb)	350 cm (140 in)	330 cm (130 in)	(Japan) Suntory Sunbirds
19	Taishi Onodera	27 February 1996	2.01 m (6 ft 7 in)	98 kg (216 lb)	330 cm (130 in)	320 cm (130 in)	(Japan) JT Thunders

Pool C

Pos	Team	Pld	W	L	Pts	SW	SL	SR	SPW	SPL	SPR	Qualification
1	Japan	2	2	0	4	6	4	1.500	224	216	1.037	Classification for 1–12
2	Myanmar	2	1	1	4	5	4	1.250	199	191	1.042	Classification for 1–12
3	Kazakhstan	2	0	2	1	3	6	0.500	193	209	0.923	Classification for 13–20

Source: OCA

Date	Time		Score		Set 1	Set 2	Set 3	Set 4	Set 5	Total	Report
22 Aug	12:30	Japan	3–2	Kazakhstan	22–25	25–20	25–27	25–19	20–18	117–109	Report
24 Aug	09:00	Myanmar	2–3	Japan	21–25	25–17	19–25	25–21	17–19	107–107	Report
26 Aug	12:30	Japan	3–1	India	25–23	25–22	23–25	25–20		98–90	Report
28 Aug	19:00	Japan	2–3	Qatar	18–25	28–26	21–25	25–22	22–24	114–122	Report
01 Sep	19:00	Indonesia	2–3	Japan	33–35	25–22	21–25	27–25	12–15	118–122	Report

==== Women's tournament ====
Team roster

The following is the Japanese roster in the women's volleyball tournament of the 2018 Asian Games.

Head coach: Kumi Nakada

No.	Name	Date of birth	Height	Weight	Spike	Block	Club
1	Miyu Nagaoka	25 July 1991	1.79 m (5 ft 10 in)	64 kg (141 lb)	308 cm (121 in)	303 cm (119 in)	(Japan) Hisamitsu Springs
3	Nana Iwasaka (C)	9 July 1990	1.87 m (6 ft 2 in)	75 kg (165 lb)	300 cm (120 in)	293 cm (115 in)	(Japan) Hisamitsu Springs
4	Risa Shinnabe	11 July 1990	1.73 m (5 ft 8 in)	64 kg (141 lb)	292 cm (115 in)	285 cm (112 in)	(Japan) Hisamitsu Springs
5	Erika Araki	3 August 1984	1.86 m (6 ft 1 in)	81 kg (179 lb)	305 cm (120 in)	297 cm (117 in)	(Japan) Toyota Auto Body Queenseis
7	Yuki Ishii	8 May 1991	1.80 m (5 ft 11 in)	68 kg (150 lb)	302 cm (119 in)	287 cm (113 in)	(Japan) Hisamitsu Springs
9	Haruyo Shimamura	4 March 1992	1.82 m (6 ft 0 in)	78 kg (172 lb)	298 cm (117 in)	290 cm (110 in)	(Japan) NEC Red Rockets
10	Koyomi Tominaga	1 May 1989	1.75 m (5 ft 9 in)	68 kg (150 lb)	297 cm (117 in)	280 cm (110 in)	(Japan) Ageo Medics
11	Yurie Nabeya	15 December 1993	1.76 m (5 ft 9 in)	55 kg (121 lb)	302 cm (119 in)	292 cm (115 in)	(Japan) Denso Airybees
12	Miya Sato	7 March 1990	1.75 m (5 ft 9 in)	62 kg (137 lb)	284 cm (112 in)	280 cm (110 in)	(Japan) Hitachi Rivale
13	Mai Okumura	31 October 1990	1.77 m (5 ft 10 in)	69 kg (152 lb)	297 cm (117 in)	285 cm (112 in)	(Thailand) Nakhon Ratchasima
15	Kotoe Inoue	15 February 1990	1.62 m (5 ft 4 in)	59 kg (130 lb)	288 cm (113 in)	275 cm (108 in)	(Japan) JT Marvelous
16	Mako Kobata	15 August 1992	1.64 m (5 ft 5 in)	56 kg (123 lb)	281 cm (111 in)	274 cm (108 in)	(Japan) JT Marvelous
17	Rika Nomoto	21 September 1991	1.80 m (5 ft 11 in)	72 kg (159 lb)	308 cm (121 in)	291 cm (115 in)	(Japan) Hisamitsu Springs
19	Ai Kurogo	14 June 1998	1.80 m (5 ft 11 in)	69 kg (152 lb)	306 cm (120 in)	295 cm (116 in)	(Japan) Toray Arrows

Pool A

Pos	Team	Pld	W	L	Pts	SW	SL	SR	SPW	SPL	SPR	Qualification
1	Thailand	4	4	0	12	12	1	12.000	322	221	1.457	Quarterfinals
2	Japan	4	3	1	9	9	3	3.000	290	197	1.472	Quarterfinals
3	Indonesia	4	2	2	6	7	8	0.875	315	328	0.960	Quarterfinals
4	Philippines	4	1	3	3	4	9	0.444	260	310	0.839	Quarterfinals
5	Hong Kong	4	0	4	0	1	12	0.083	190	321	0.592	Classification for 9–11

Source: OCA

Date	Time		Score		Set 1	Set 2	Set 3	Set 4	Set 5	Total	Report
19 Aug	19:00	Japan	3–0	Indonesia	25–20	25–11	25–19			75–50	Report
21 Aug	16:30	Philippines	0–3	Japan	12–25	15–25	21–25			48–75	Report
23 Aug	19:00	Thailand	3–0	Japan	25–20	27–25	25–20			77–65	Report
27 Aug	10:00	Japan	3–0	Hong Kong	25–4	25–7	25–11			75–22	Report
29 Aug	12:30	Japan	3–0	Kazakhstan	25–16	25–18	25–21			75–55	Report
31 Aug	19:30	China	3–0	Japan	25–22	25–10	25–20			75–52	Report
01 Sep	12:30	South Korea	3–1	Japan	25–18	21–25	25–15	27–25		98–83	Report

== Water polo ==
Summary

Key:

- FT – After full time.
- P – Match decided by penalty-shootout.

Team	Event	Group stage						Quarterfinal	Semifinal / Pl.	Final / BM / Pl.	
Team	Event	Opposition score	Opposition score	Opposition score	Opposition score	Opposition score	Rank	Opposition score	Opposition score	Opposition score	Rank
Japan men's	Men's tournament	China; W 12–4	Indonesia; W 24–7	Hong Kong; W 23–0	Saudi Arabia; W 20–4	—N/a	1 Q	Singapore; W 28–6	Iran; W 18–7	Kazakhstan; L 7–8	2nd place, silver medalist(s)
Japan women's	Women's tournament	Indonesia; W 15–4	China; L 8–12	Thailand; W 19–5	Hong Kong; W 31–3	Kazakhstan; L 11–12	3	—N/a			3rd place, bronze medalist(s)

=== Men's tournament ===
Team roster

Head coach: Yoji Omoto

1. Katsuyuki Tanamura (GK)
2. Seiya Adachi (D)
3. Harukiirario Koppu (CB)
4. Mitsuaki Shiga (D)
5. Takuma Yoshida (D)
6. Atsuto Iida (CB)
7. Takumu Miyazawa (CF)
8. Mitsuru Takata (D)
9. Atsushi Arai (D)
10. Yusuke Inaba (D)
11. Keigo Okawa (CB) (C)
12. Kenta Araki (CF)
13. Tomoyoshi Fukushima (GK)

Group B

Pos	Team	Pld	W	D	L	GF	GA	GD	Pts	Qualification
1	Japan	4	4	0	0	79	15	+64	8	Quarterfinals
2	China	4	3	0	1	63	22	+41	6	Quarterfinals
3	Saudi Arabia	4	1	1	2	33	55	−22	3 (Note: Head-to-head result: KSA 12–12 INA. Goal difference against the highest placed team (JPN): KSA −16, INA −17.)	Quarterfinals
4	Indonesia	4	1	1	2	32	63	−31	3	Quarterfinals
5	Hong Kong	4	0	0	4	17	69	−52	0	

Source: OCA
Notes:

25 August; 16:20	Japan	12–4	China	Gelora Bung Karno Aquatic Stadium, Jakarta; Referees: Stavridis (GRE), Alexandrescu (ROU)
25 August; 16:20	Score by quarters: 2–1, 4–0, 3–1, 3–2			Gelora Bung Karno Aquatic Stadium, Jakarta; Referees: Stavridis (GRE), Alexandrescu (ROU)
25 August; 16:20	Adachi 3	Goals	four players 1	Gelora Bung Karno Aquatic Stadium, Jakarta; Referees: Stavridis (GRE), Alexandrescu (ROU)

27 August; 17:10	Indonesia	7–24	Japan	Gelora Bung Karno Aquatic Stadium, Jakarta; Referees: Jiathornwattana (THA), Štampalija (CRO)
27 August; 17:10	Score by quarters: 3–9, 1–8, 2–4, 1–3			Gelora Bung Karno Aquatic Stadium, Jakarta; Referees: Jiathornwattana (THA), Štampalija (CRO)
27 August; 17:10	Harahap 4	Goals	Inaba 7	Gelora Bung Karno Aquatic Stadium, Jakarta; Referees: Jiathornwattana (THA), Štampalija (CRO)

28 August; 14:30	Hong Kong	0–23	Japan	Gelora Bung Karno Aquatic Stadium, Jakarta; Referees: Tan (SGP), Han (KOR)
28 August; 14:30	Score by quarters: 0–7, 0–6, 0–5, 0–5			Gelora Bung Karno Aquatic Stadium, Jakarta; Referees: Tan (SGP), Han (KOR)
28 August; 14:30	0	Goals	Adachi 5	Gelora Bung Karno Aquatic Stadium, Jakarta; Referees: Tan (SGP), Han (KOR)

29 August; 15:50	Japan	20–4	Saudi Arabia	Gelora Bung Karno Aquatic Stadium, Jakarta; Referees: Ni (CHN), Jiathornwattana (THA)
29 August; 15:50	Score by quarters: 4–1, 5–1, 6–0, 5–2			Gelora Bung Karno Aquatic Stadium, Jakarta; Referees: Ni (CHN), Jiathornwattana (THA)
29 August; 15:50	Adachi 5	Goals	Al-Dughather 2	Gelora Bung Karno Aquatic Stadium, Jakarta; Referees: Ni (CHN), Jiathornwattana (THA)

Quarter-final

30 August; 17:50	Singapore	6–28	Japan	Gelora Bung Karno Aquatic Stadium, Jakarta; Referees: Stavridis (GRE), Salnichenko (KAZ)
30 August; 17:50	Score by quarters: 2–5, 1–8, 2–10, 1–5			Gelora Bung Karno Aquatic Stadium, Jakarta; Referees: Stavridis (GRE), Salnichenko (KAZ)
30 August; 17:50	Loh, S. Yu 2	Goals	Inaba 5	Gelora Bung Karno Aquatic Stadium, Jakarta; Referees: Stavridis (GRE), Salnichenko (KAZ)

Semifinal

31 August; 16:00	Iran	7–18	Japan	Gelora Bung Karno Aquatic Stadium, Jakarta; Referees: Tan (SGP), Flahive (AUS)
31 August; 16:00	Score by quarters: 0–5, 1–1, 4–6, 2–6			Gelora Bung Karno Aquatic Stadium, Jakarta; Referees: Tan (SGP), Flahive (AUS)
31 August; 16:00	Malek-Khanbanan, Yazdankhah 2	Goals	Inaba 6	Gelora Bung Karno Aquatic Stadium, Jakarta; Referees: Tan (SGP), Flahive (AUS)

Gold medal game

1 September; 17:20	Japan	7–8	Kazakhstan	Gelora Bung Karno Aquatic Stadium, Jakarta; Referees: Štampalija (CRO), Flahive (AUS)
1 September; 17:20	Score by quarters: 3–2, 2–0, 2–3, 0–3			Gelora Bung Karno Aquatic Stadium, Jakarta; Referees: Štampalija (CRO), Flahive (AUS)
1 September; 17:20	Adachi 3	Goals	Ruday 3	Gelora Bung Karno Aquatic Stadium, Jakarta; Referees: Štampalija (CRO), Flahive (AUS)

=== Women's tournament ===
Team roster

Head coach: Makihiro Motomiya

1. Minami Shioya (GK)
2. Yumi Arima (CB)
3. Akari Inaba (D)
4. Shino Magariyama (D)
5. Chiaki Sakanoue (D)
6. Minori Yamamoto (D)
7. Maiko Hashida (D)
8. Yuki Niizawa (D)
9. Kana Hosoya (D)
10. Misaki Noro (D)
11. Marina Tokumoto (CB)
12. Kotori Suzuki (D) (C)
13. Miyuu Aoki (GK)

Round robin

Pos	Team	Pld	W	D	L	GF	GA	GD	Pts
1	China	5	5	0	0	76	24	+52	10
2	Kazakhstan	5	4	0	1	70	34	+36	8
3	Japan	5	3	0	2	84	36	+48	6
4	Thailand	5	2	0	3	53	62	−9	4
5	Indonesia	5	1	0	4	30	82	−52	2
6	Hong Kong	5	0	0	5	22	97	−75	0

Source: OCA

16 August; 14:30	Japan	15–4	Indonesia	Gelora Bung Karno Aquatic Stadium, Jakarta; Referees: Štampalija (CRO), Tan (SGP)
16 August; 14:30	Score by quarters: 5–2, 2–1, 3–0, 5–1			Gelora Bung Karno Aquatic Stadium, Jakarta; Referees: Štampalija (CRO), Tan (SGP)
16 August; 14:30	Sakanoue 4	Goals	four players 1	Gelora Bung Karno Aquatic Stadium, Jakarta; Referees: Štampalija (CRO), Tan (SGP)

17 August; 17:10	Japan	8–12	China	Gelora Bung Karno Aquatic Stadium, Jakarta; Referees: Flahive (AUS), Stavridis (GRE)
17 August; 17:10	Score by quarters: 0–3, 1–3, 3–2, 4–4			Gelora Bung Karno Aquatic Stadium, Jakarta; Referees: Flahive (AUS), Stavridis (GRE)
17 August; 17:10	four players 2	Goals	Xiong, Zhang J. 3	Gelora Bung Karno Aquatic Stadium, Jakarta; Referees: Flahive (AUS), Stavridis (GRE)

19 August; 17:10	Thailand	5–19	Japan	Gelora Bung Karno Aquatic Stadium, Jakarta; Referees: Han (KOR), Ni (CHN)
19 August; 17:10	Score by quarters: 2–7, 0–2, 0–6, 3–4			Gelora Bung Karno Aquatic Stadium, Jakarta; Referees: Han (KOR), Ni (CHN)
19 August; 17:10	Sathitanon 2	Goals	Arima, Inaba 5	Gelora Bung Karno Aquatic Stadium, Jakarta; Referees: Han (KOR), Ni (CHN)

20 August; 15:50	Japan	31–3	Hong Kong	Gelora Bung Karno Aquatic Stadium, Jakarta; Referees: Jiathornwattana (THA), Salnichenko (KAZ)
20 August; 15:50	Score by quarters: 8–2, 5–0, 12–0, 6–1			Gelora Bung Karno Aquatic Stadium, Jakarta; Referees: Jiathornwattana (THA), Salnichenko (KAZ)
20 August; 15:50	Arima 7	Goals	Chan, Ng, Yeung S. 1	Gelora Bung Karno Aquatic Stadium, Jakarta; Referees: Jiathornwattana (THA), Salnichenko (KAZ)

21 August; 17:10	Kazakhstan	12–11	Japan	Gelora Bung Karno Aquatic Stadium, Jakarta; Referees: Stavridis (GRE), Štampalija (CRO)
21 August; 17:10	Score by quarters: 1–0, 3–3, 4–5, 4–3			Gelora Bung Karno Aquatic Stadium, Jakarta; Referees: Stavridis (GRE), Štampalija (CRO)
21 August; 17:10	Myrzabekova 6	Goals	Magariyama, Hashida 3	Gelora Bung Karno Aquatic Stadium, Jakarta; Referees: Stavridis (GRE), Štampalija (CRO)

== Weightlifting ==
Japan Weightlifting Association entered the Games with 15 weightlifters (8 men's and 7 women's).

Men

Athlete	Event	Snatch		Clean & jerk		Total	Rank
Athlete	Event	Result	Rank	Result	Rank	Total	Rank
Yoichi Itokazu	−62 kg	130	5	158	6	288	5
Hiroaki Takao	−62 kg	125	10	152	9	277	10
Miyamoto Masanori	−69 kg	138	10	178	6	316	8
Konnai Mitsunori	−69 kg	137	11	170	10	307	10
Kasai Takehiro	−77 kg	144	9	182	4	326	6
Ioroi Masakazu	−77 kg	140	12	175	8	315	9
Yamamoto Toshiki	−85 kg	155	5	191	3	346	4
Tanaka Taro	−105 kg	172	6	200	6	372	6

Women

Athlete	Event	Snatch		Clean & jerk		Total	Rank
Athlete	Event	Result	Rank	Result	Rank	Total	Rank
Ibuki Takahashi	−48 kg	73	7	99	6	172	7
Mizuki Yanagida	−48 kg	70	10	93	9	163	9
Kanae Yagi	−53 kg	84	7	106	7	190	7
Ayana Sadoyama	−53 kg	75	10	91	11	166	11
Mikiko Ando	−58 kg	91	5	127	2	218	3rd place, bronze medalist(s)
Miku Ishii	−69 kg	85	7	115	6	200	7
Kamiya Ayumi	−75 kg	100	4	122	5	222	5

== Wrestling ==
Key:

- F – Victory by fall.
- PP – Decision by points – the loser with technical points.
- PO – Decision by points – the loser without technical points.
- ST – Great superiority – the loser without technical points and a margin of victory of at least 8 (Greco-Roman) or 10 (freestyle) points.

Men's freestyle

Athlete	Event	Qualification	Round of 16	Quarterfinal	Semifinal	Repechage 1	Repechage 2	Final / BM	
Athlete	Event	Opposition Result	Opposition Result	Opposition Result	Opposition Result	Opposition Result	Opposition Result	Opposition Result	Rank
Yuki Takahashi	−57 kg	Bye	Kang K-s (PRK); L 5–9	Did not advance		Bye	Z Ismailov (KAZ); W 7–4	Liu MH (CHN); W 3–3 ^{PP}	3rd place, bronze medalist(s)
Daichi Takatani	−65 kg	M Hussain (PAK); W 10–0	C Thoun (CAM); W 6^{F}–0	B Borjakow (TKM); W 13–2	Okassov (KAZ); W 4–4 ^{PP}	Bye		B Punia (IND); L 8–11	2nd place, silver medalist(s)
Yuhi Fujinami	−74 kg	S Chunara (NEP); W 10–0	Mandakhnaran (MGL); W 13–2	Batirov (BRN); W 8–2	Abdurakhmonov (UZB); L 1–11	Bye		Hosseinkhani (IRI); W 9–8	3rd place, bronze medalist(s)
Shota Shirai	−86 kg	S Al-Asta (SYR); W 2^{F}–0	Kurbanov (UZB); L 0–4	Did not advance					8
Takeshi Yamaguchi	−97 kg	—N/a	Bye	Karimi (IRI); L 0–11	Did not advance	Bye	—N/a	Ibragimov (UZB); L 0^{R}–6	5
Nobuyoshi Arakida	−125 kg	—N/a	O Boltin (KAZ); L 0–1	Did not advance			—N/a	Did not advance	10

Men's Greco-Roman

Athlete	Event	Round of 16	Quarterfinal	Semifinal	Repechage	Final / BM	
Athlete	Event	Opposition Result	Opposition Result	Opposition Result	Opposition Result	Opposition Result	Rank
Shinobu Ota	−60 kg	H Sidik (INA); W 8–0	Mardani (IRI); W 9–0	I Bakhramov (UZB); W 6–0	Bye	Zholchubekov (KGZ); W 8^{F}–3	1st place, gold medalist(s)
Tsuchika Shimoyamada	−67 kg	MKundu (IND); L 3–7	Did not advance				11
Shohei Yabiku	−77 kg	Nguyễn B S (VIE); W 9^{F}–0	Dilmukhamedov (KAZ); W 3–3 ^{PP}	Geraei (IRI); L 1–8	Bye	Yang B (CHN); L 3–4	5
Masato Sumi	−87 kg	Peng F (CHN); W 3–1	H Singh (IND); L 0–8	Did not advance			8
Yuta Nara	−97 kg	Bye	Dzhuzupbekov (KGZ); L 1–7	Did not advance			8
Arata Sonoda	−130 kg	Bye	S Belliýew (TKM); W 9–1	Tinaliyev (KAZ); L 0–6	Bye	P Ramadhani (INA); W 2^{F}–0	3rd place, bronze medalist(s)

Women's freestyle

Athlete	Event	Round of 16	Quarterfinal	Semifinal	Repechage	Final / BM	
Athlete	Event	Opposition Result	Opposition Result	Opposition Result	Opposition Result	Opposition Result	Rank
Yuki Irie	−50 kg	Bye	E Setiawati (INA); W 8^{F}–0	Kim S-h (PRK); W 13–4	Bye	V Phogat (IND); L 2–6	2nd place, silver medalist(s)
Haruna Okuno	−53 kg	S Eshmuratova (UZB); W 10–0	Pang QY (CHN); W 4–1	Pak Y-m (PRK); L 7–7 ^{PP}	Bye	Chiu H-j (TPE); W 6^{F}–0	3rd place, bronze medalist(s)
Katsuki Sakagami	−57 kg	Jong M-s (PRK); L 6–9	Did not advance		E Tissina (KAZ); W 11–0	P Dhanda (IND); W 6–1	3rd place, bronze medalist(s)
Risako Kawai	−62 kg	Bye	Hang J-w (KOR); W 12–1	P Orkhon (MGL); L 2–2^{F}	Bye	Nguyễn T M H (VIE); W 10–0	3rd place, bronze medalist(s)
Ayana Gempei	−68 kg	Z Bakbergenova (KAZ); W 5–2	Zhou F (CHN); L 3–6	Did not advance	S Sultana (BAN); W 10–0	M Zhumanazarova (KGZ); L 3–7	5
Hiroe Minagawa	−76 kg	Bye	O Nasanburmaa (MGL); W 13–1	A M Kyzy (KGZ); W 2–1	—N/a	Zhou Q (CHN); L 0–8	2nd place, silver medalist(s)

== Wushu ==
Taolu

Athlete	Event	Event 1		Event 2		Total	Rank
Athlete	Event	Result	Rank	Result	Rank	Total	Rank
Ren Sakamoto	Men's changquan	9.64	7	—N/a		9.64	7
Ryouta Mouri	Men's nanquan and nangun	9.68	6	9.69	8	19.37	5
Tomohiro Araya	Men's taijiquan and taijijian	9.70	2	9.72	2	19.42	2nd place, silver medalist(s)
Hibiki Betto	Men's daoshu and gunshu	9.67	7	9.70	4	19.37	5
Shiho Saito	Women's taijiquan and taijijian	9.53	11	9.57	9	19.10	9
Keiko Yamaguchi	Women's jianshu and qiangshu	9.67	4	9.57	5	19.24	5
