= Swimming at the 2018 Asian Games =

- Venue: Gelora Bung Karno Aquatic Stadium
- Dates: 19–24 August 2018
- Competitors: 366 from 39 nations

Swimming at the 2018 Asian Games was held at the Gelora Bung Karno Aquatic Stadium in Gelora Bung Karno Sports Complex, Jakarta, Indonesia, from 19 to 24 August 2018.

The winning team Japan collected almost a quarter of its total gold medals in this edition from swimming events only.

== Schedule ==
H	Heats	F	Final

Event↓/Date →	19th Sun		20th Mon		21st Tue		22nd Wed		23rd Thu		24th Fri	
Men's 50 m freestyle					H	F						
Men's 100 m freestyle									H	F		
Men's 200 m freestyle	H	F										
Men's 400 m freestyle					H	F						
Men's 800 m freestyle			F									
Men's 1500 m freestyle											F	
Men's 50 m backstroke			H	F								
Men's 100 m backstroke	H	F										
Men's 200 m backstroke									H	F		
Men's 50 m breaststroke											H	F
Men's 100 m breaststroke							H	F				
Men's 200 m breaststroke					H	F						
Men's 50 m butterfly									H	F		
Men's 100 m butterfly							H	F				
Men's 200 m butterfly	H	F										
Men's 200 m individual medley			H	F								
Men's 400 m individual medley							H	F				
Men's 4 × 100 m freestyle relay							H	F				
Men's 4 × 200 m freestyle relay			H	F								
Men's 4 × 100 m medley relay											H	F
Women's 50 m freestyle											H	F
Women's 100 m freestyle			H	F								
Women's 200 m freestyle							H	F				
Women's 400 m freestyle											H	F
Women's 800 m freestyle									F			
Women's 1500 m freestyle	F											
Women's 50 m backstroke					H	F						
Women's 100 m backstroke							H	F				
Women's 200 m backstroke	H	F										
Women's 50 m breaststroke									H	F		
Women's 100 m breaststroke	H	F										
Women's 200 m breaststroke			H	F								
Women's 50 m butterfly			H	F								
Women's 100 m butterfly					H	F						
Women's 200 m butterfly							H	F				
Women's 200 m individual medley											H	F
Women's 400 m individual medley					H	F						
Women's 4 × 100 m freestyle relay	H	F										
Women's 4 × 200 m freestyle relay					H	F						
Women's 4 × 100 m medley relay									H	F		
Mixed 4 × 100 m medley relay							H	F				

== Medalists ==
=== Men ===
Event	Gold		Silver		Bronze	
50 m freestyle	Yu Hexin; China	22.11	Katsumi Nakamura; Japan	22.20	Shunichi Nakao; Japan	22.46
100 m freestyle	Shinri Shioura; Japan	48.71	Katsumi Nakamura; Japan	48.72	Yu Hexin; China	48.88
200 m freestyle	Sun Yang; China	1:45.43	Katsuhiro Matsumoto; Japan	1:46.50	Ji Xinjie; China	1:46.68
400 m freestyle	Sun Yang; China	3:42.92	Naito Ehara; Japan	3:47.14	Kosuke Hagino; Japan	3:47.20
800 m freestyle	Sun Yang; China	7:48.36; GR	Shogo Takeda; Japan	7:53.01	Nguyễn Huy Hoàng; Vietnam	7:54.32
1500 m freestyle	Sun Yang; China	14:58.53	Nguyễn Huy Hoàng; Vietnam	15:01.63	Ji Xinjie; China	15:06.18
50 m backstroke	Xu Jiayu; China	24.75	Ryosuke Irie; Japan	24.88	Kang Ji-seok; South Korea	25.17
100 m backstroke	Xu Jiayu; China	52.34 =GR	Ryosuke Irie; Japan	52.53	Lee Ju-ho; South Korea	54.52
200 m backstroke	Xu Jiayu; China	1:53.99; NR	Ryosuke Irie; Japan	1:55.11	Keita Sunama; Japan	1:55.54
50 m breaststroke	Yasuhiro Koseki; Japan	27.07	Yan Zibei; China	27.25	Dmitriy Balandin; Kazakhstan	27.46
100 m breaststroke	Yasuhiro Koseki; Japan	58.86; GR	Yan Zibei; China	59.31	Dmitriy Balandin; Kazakhstan	59.39
200 m breaststroke	Yasuhiro Koseki; Japan	2:07.81	Ippei Watanabe; Japan	2:07.82	Qin Haiyang; China	2:08.07
50 m butterfly	Joseph Schooling; Singapore	23.61	Wang Peng; China	23.65	Adilbek Mussin; Kazakhstan	23.73
100 m butterfly	Joseph Schooling; Singapore	51.04; GR	Li Zhuhao; China	51.46	Yuki Kobori; Japan	51.77
200 m butterfly	Daiya Seto; Japan	1:54.53	Nao Horomura; Japan	1:55.58	Li Zhuhao; China	1:55.76
200 m individual medley	Wang Shun; China	1:56.52	Kosuke Hagino; Japan	1:56.75	Qin Haiyang; China	1:57.09
400 m individual medley	Daiya Seto; Japan	4:08.79	Kosuke Hagino; Japan	4:10.30	Wang Shun; China	4:12.31
4 × 100 m freestyle relay	Japan; Shinri Shioura; Katsuhiro Matsumoto; Katsumi Nakamura; Juran Mizohata	3:12.68; GR	China; Yang Jintong; Cao Jiwen; Sun Yang; Yu Hexin; Hou Yujie; Qian Zhiyong; Ma Tianchi; Ji Xinjie	3:13.29	Singapore; Quah Zheng Wen; Joseph Schooling; Darren Chua; Darren Lim; Danny Yeo; Jonathan Tan	3:17.22
4 × 200 m freestyle relay	Japan; Naito Ehara; Reo Sakata; Kosuke Hagino; Katsuhiro Matsumoto; Juran Mizohata; Ayatsugu Hirai; Yuki Kobori	7:05.17; GR	China; Ji Xinjie; Shang Keyuan; Wang Shun; Sun Yang; Qiu Ziao; Hong Jinlong; Hou Yujie; Qian Zhiyong	7:05.45	Singapore; Quah Zheng Wen; Joseph Schooling; Danny Yeo; Jonathan Tan; Darren Chua; Glen Lim	7:14.15
4 × 100 m medley relay	China; Xu Jiayu; Yan Zibei; Li Zhuhao; Yu Hexin; Li Guangyuan; Qin Haiyang; Zheng Xiaojing; He Junyi	3:29.99; AR	Japan; Ryosuke Irie; Yasuhiro Koseki; Yuki Kobori; Shinri Shioura; Masaki Kaneko; Ippei Watanabe; Nao Horomura; Katsumi Nakamura	3:30.03; NR	Kazakhstan; Adil Kaskabay; Dmitriy Balandin; Adilbek Mussin; Alexandr Varakin	3:35.62

=== Women ===
Event	Gold		Silver		Bronze	
50 m freestyle	Rikako Ikee; Japan	24.53; GR	Liu Xiang; China	24.60	Wu Qingfeng; China	24.87
100 m freestyle	Rikako Ikee; Japan	53.27; GR	Zhu Menghui; China	53.56	Yang Junxuan; China	54.17
200 m freestyle	Li Bingjie; China	1:56.74	Yang Junxuan; China	1:57.48	Chihiro Igarashi; Japan	1:57.49
400 m freestyle	Wang Jianjiahe; China	4:03.18; GR	Li Bingjie; China	4:06.46	Chihiro Igarashi; Japan	4:08.48
800 m freestyle	Wang Jianjiahe; China	8:18.55; GR	Li Bingjie; China	8:28.14	Waka Kobori; Japan	8:30.65
1500 m freestyle	Wang Jianjiahe; China	15:53.68; GR	Li Bingjie; China	15:53.80	Waka Kobori; Japan	16:18.31
50 m backstroke	Liu Xiang; China	26.98; WR	Fu Yuanhui; China	27.68	Natsumi Sakai; Japan	27.91
100 m backstroke	Natsumi Sakai; Japan	59.27	Anna Konishi; Japan	59.67	Chen Jie; China	1:00.28
200 m backstroke	Liu Yaxin; China	2:07.65	Natsumi Sakai; Japan	2:08.13	Peng Xuwei; China	2:09.14
50 m breaststroke	Satomi Suzuki; Japan	30.83; GR	Roanne Ho; Singapore	31.23	Feng Junyang; China	31.24
100 m breaststroke	Satomi Suzuki; Japan	1:06.40; GR	Reona Aoki; Japan	1:06.45	Shi Jinglin; China	1:07.36
200 m breaststroke	Kanako Watanabe; Japan	2:23.05	Yu Jingyao; China	2:23.31	Reona Aoki; Japan	2:23.33
50 m butterfly	Rikako Ikee; Japan	25.55; GR	Wang Yichun; China	26.03	Lin Xintong; China	26.39
100 m butterfly	Rikako Ikee; Japan	56.30; GR	Zhang Yufei; China	57.40	An Se-hyeon; South Korea	58.00
200 m butterfly	Zhang Yufei; China	2:06.61	Sachi Mochida; Japan	2:08.72	Suzuka Hasegawa; Japan	2:08.80
200 m individual medley	Kim Seo-yeong; South Korea	2:08.34; GR, NR	Yui Ohashi; Japan	2:08.88	Miho Teramura; Japan	2:10.98
400 m individual medley	Yui Ohashi; Japan	4:34.58	Kim Seo-yeong; South Korea	4:37.43	Sakiko Shimizu; Japan	4:39.10
4 × 100 m freestyle relay	Japan; Rikako Ikee; Natsumi Sakai; Tomomi Aoki; Chihiro Igarashi; Mayuka Yamamoto; Rio Shirai	3:36.52; GR	China; Zhu Menghui; Wu Yue; Wu Qingfeng; Yang Junxuan; Wang Jingzhuo; Lao Lihui; Liu Xiaohan	3:36.78	Hong Kong; Camille Cheng; Stephanie Au; Tam Hoi Lam; Sze Hang Yu; Tinky Ho	3:41.88
4 × 200 m freestyle relay	China; Li Bingjie; Wang Jianjiahe; Zhang Yuhan; Yang Junxuan; Shen Duo; Ai Yanhan; Wu Yue	7:48.61; GR	Japan; Chihiro Igarashi; Rikako Ikee; Yui Ohashi; Rio Shirai; Waka Kobori; Sachi Mochida	7:53.83	Hong Kong; Tinky Ho; Camille Cheng; Katii Tang; Sze Hang Yu; Jamie Yeung; Natalie Kan; Chan Kin Lok	8:07.17
4 × 100 m medley relay	Japan; Natsumi Sakai; Satomi Suzuki; Rikako Ikee; Tomomi Aoki; Anna Konishi; Reona Aoki; Ai Soma; Sakiko Shimizu	3:54.73; GR, NR	Hong Kong; Stephanie Au; Jamie Yeung; Chan Kin Lok; Camille Cheng; Toto Wong; Rainbow Ip; Sze Hang Yu; Tam Hoi Lam	4:03.15	Singapore; Hoong En Qi; Samantha Yeo; Quah Jing Wen; Quah Ting Wen; Cherlyn Yeoh	4:09.65

=== Mixed ===
Event	Gold		Silver		Bronze	
4 × 100 m medley relay	China; Xu Jiayu; Yan Zibei; Zhang Yufei; Zhu Menghui; Li Guangyuan; Shi Jinglin; Zheng Xiaojing; Yang Junxuan	3:40.45; AR	Japan; Ryosuke Irie; Yasuhiro Koseki; Rikako Ikee; Tomomi Aoki; Masaki Kaneko; Ippei Watanabe; Mayuka Yamamoto	3:41.21	South Korea; Lee Ju-ho; Moon Jae-kwon; An Se-hyeon; Ko Mi-so; Kang Ji-seok; Kim Jae-youn; Park Ye-rin; Kim Min-ju	3:49.27

== Medal table ==
Rank	Nation	Gold	Silver	Bronze	Total
1	Japan (JPN)	19	20	13	52
2	China (CHN)	19	17	14	50
3	Singapore (SGP)	2	1	3	6
4	South Korea (KOR)	1	1	4	6
5	Hong Kong (HKG)	0	1	2	3
6	Vietnam (VIE)	0	1	1	2
7	Kazakhstan (KAZ)	0	0	4	4
Totals (7 entries)		41	41	41	123

== Participating nations ==
A total of 366 athletes from 39 nations competed in swimming at the 2018 Asian Games:

- Afghanistan (1)
- Bangladesh (2)
- Cambodia (3)
- China (52)
- Chinese Taipei (16)
- Hong Kong (32)
- India (11)
- Indonesia (19)
- Iran (4)
- Japan (38)
- Jordan (3)
- Kazakhstan (7)
- Kuwait (2)
- Kyrgyzstan (3)
- Laos (3)
- Lebanon (2)
- Macau (14)
- Malaysia (6)
- Maldives (8)
- Mongolia (14)
- Nepal (4)
- North Korea (2)
- Oman (2)
- Pakistan (7)
- Palestine (5)
- Philippines (2)
- Qatar (8)
- Saudi Arabia (1)
- Singapore (25)
- South Korea (27)
- Sri Lanka (5)
- Syria (1)
- Tajikistan (5)
- Thailand (12)
- Timor-Leste (1)
- Turkmenistan (2)
- Uzbekistan (5)
- Vietnam (10)
- Yemen (2)
