= Swimming at the 2018 Asian Games – Women's 4 × 100 metre medley relay =

Women's 4 × 100 metre medley relay at the 2018 Asian Games
- Venue: Gelora Bung Karno Aquatic Stadium
- Date: 23 August 2018
- Competitors: 59 from 10 nations

Medalists
gold medal	Japan; Natsumi Sakai, Satomi Suzuki, Rikako Ikee, Tomomi Aoki, Anna Konishi, Reona Aoki, Ai Soma, Sakiko Shimizu
silver medal	Hong Kong; Stephanie Au, Jamie Yeung, Chan Kin Lok, Camille Cheng, Toto Wong, Rainbow Ip, Sze Hang Yu, Tam Hoi Lam
bronze medal	Singapore; Hoong En Qi, Samantha Yeo, Quah Jing Wen, Quah Ting Wen, Cherlyn Yeoh

The women's 4 × 100 metre medley relay event at the 2018 Asian Games took place on 23 August at the Gelora Bung Karno Aquatic Stadium.

== Schedule ==
All times are Western Indonesia Time (UTC+07:00)

Date	Time	Event
Thursday, 23 August 2018	10:03	Heats
Thursday, 23 August 2018	19:17	Final

== Records ==
Prior to this competition, the existing world, Asian and Games records were as follows.

World Record	United States	3:51.55	Budapest, Hungary	30 July 2017
Asian Record	China	3:52.19	Rome, Italy	1 August 2009
Games Record	China	3:57.80	Guangzhou, China	13 November 2010

== Results ==
Legend

- DSQ — Disqualified

=== Heats ===
Rank	Heat	Team	Time	Notes
1	2	Japan (JPN)	4:01.65	
		Anna Konishi	59.72	
		Reona Aoki	1:06.63	
		Ai Soma	58.39	
		Sakiko Shimizu	56.91	
2	1	China (CHN)	4:02.67	
		Fu Yuanhui	1:00.90	
		Yu Jingyao	1:07.67	
		Lin Xintong	59.30	
		Yang Junxuan	54.80	
3	1	South Korea (KOR)	4:10.94	
		Shin Young-yeon	1:02.88	
		Back Su-yeon	1:09.50	
		Park Ye-rin	1:00.74	
		Kim Min-ju	57.82	
4	2	Singapore (SGP)	4:12.73	
		Hoong En Qi	1:04.43	
		Samantha Yeo	1:10.95	
		Quah Jing Wen	1:00.92	
		Cherlyn Yeoh	56.43	
5	2	Hong Kong (HKG)	4:15.99	
		Toto Wong	1:02.38	
		Rainbow Ip	1:11:22	
		Sze Hang Yu	1:03.38	
		Tam Hoi Lam	59.01	
6	1	Indonesia (INA)	4:18.94	
		Nurul Fajar Fitriyati	1:04.17	
		Anandia Evato	1:11.86	
		Azzahra Permatahani	1:02.78	
		Sofie Kemala Fatiha	1:00.13	
7	2	Thailand (THA)	4:21.61	
		Araya Wongvat	1:05.91	
		Saovanee Boonamphai	1:12.68	
		Kornkarnjana Sapianchai	1:03.17	
		Natthanan Junkrajang	59.85	
8	1	Macau (MAC)	4:26.07	
		Erica Vong	1:05.49	
		Cheang Weng Lam	1:14.88	
		Tan Chi Yan	1:06.69	
		Lei On Kei	59.01	
9	2	Mongolia (MGL)	4:52.13	
		Bayaryn Yesüi	1:14.69	
		Temüüjingiin Amingoo	1:25.63	
		Batbayaryn Enkhkhüslen	1:08.25	
		Khuyagbaataryn Enkhzul	1:03.56	
10	1	Maldives (MDV)	5:42.33	
		Aishath Sausan	1:19.85	
		Aishath Hulva Khulail	1:35.74	
		Anmau Ahmed Saleem	1:29.42	
		Aishath Sajina	1:17.32	

=== Final ===
Rank	Team	Time	Notes
1st place, gold medalist(s)	Japan (JPN)	3:54.73	GR
	Natsumi Sakai	59.42	
	Satomi Suzuki	1:05.43	
	Rikako Ikee	55.80	
	Tomomi Aoki	54.08	
2nd place, silver medalist(s)	Hong Kong (HKG)	4:03.15	
	Stephanie Au	1:00.38	
	Jamie Yeung	1:08.16	
	Chan Kin Lok	59.76	
	Camille Cheng	54.85	
3rd place, bronze medalist(s)	Singapore (SGP)	4:09.65	
	Hoong En Qi	1:04.06	
	Samantha Yeo	1:10.82	
	Quah Jing Wen	58.75	
	Quah Ting Wen	56.02	
4	Indonesia (INA)	4:11.63	
	Nurul Fajar Fitriyati	1:03.41	
	Anandia Evato	1:09.75	
	Adinda Larasati Dewi	1:01.45	
	Patricia Yosita Hapsari	57.02	
5	Thailand (THA)	4:18.19	
	Araya Wongvat	1:05.67	
	Saovanee Boonamphai	1:14.35	
	Kornkarnjana Sapianchai	1:00.91	
	Natthanan Junkrajang	57.26	
6	Macau (MAC)	4:25.14	
	Erica Vong	1:05.07	
	Cheang Weng Lam	1:14.21	
	Tan Chi Yan	1:05.21	
	Lei On Kei	1:00.65	
—	China (CHN)	DSQ	
	Chen Jie	1:01.06	
	Shi Jinglin	1:06.40	
	Zhang Yufei		
	Zhu Menghui		
—	South Korea (KOR)	DSQ	
	Im Da-sol	1:01.35	
	Kim Hye-jin	1:07.59	
	An Se-hyeon	57.32	
	Ko Mi-so		
