= Swimming at the 2018 Asian Games – Women's 100 metre backstroke =

Women's 100 metre backstroke at the 2018 Asian Games
- Venue: Gelora Bung Karno Aquatic Stadium
- Date: 22 August 2018
- Competitors: 21 from 13 nations

Medalists
gold medal	Natsumi Sakai	Japan
silver medal	Anna Konishi	Japan
bronze medal	Chen Jie	China

The women's 100 metre backstroke event at the 2018 Asian Games took place on 22 August at the Gelora Bung Karno Aquatic Stadium.

== Schedule ==
All times are Western Indonesia Time (UTC+07:00)

Date	Time	Event
Wednesday, 22 August 2018	10:07	Heats
Wednesday, 22 August 2018	19:15	Final

== Records ==
Prior to this competition, the existing world, Asian and Games records were as follows.

World Record	Kathleen Baker (USA)	58.00	Irvine, United States	28 July 2018
Asian Record	Aya Terakawa (JPN)	58.70	Barcelona, Spain	4 August 2013
Games Record	Zhao Jing (CHN)	58.94	Guangzhou, China	13 November 2010

== Results ==
=== Heats ===
Rank	Heat	Athlete	Time	Notes
1	2	Anna Konishi (JPN)	1:00.44	
2	3	Natsumi Sakai (JPN)	1:00.53	
3	1	Chen Jie (CHN)	1:00.84	
4	2	Stephanie Au (HKG)	1:01.31	Withdrew
5	2	Toto Wong (HKG)	1:01.92	
6	3	Fu Yuanhui (CHN)	1:02.41	
7	1	Shin Young-yeon (KOR)	1:02.57	
8	3	Im Da-sol (KOR)	1:02.58	
9	1	Yulduz Kuchkarova (UZB)	1:03.77	Advanced
10	3	Nurul Fajar Fitriyati (INA)	1:04.22	
11	1	Hoong En Qi (SGP)	1:04.94	
12	3	Roxanne Yu (PHI)	1:05.10	
13	1	Erica Vong (MAC)	1:05.36	
14	2	Yessy Yosaputra (INA)	1:05.53	
15	2	Araya Wongvat (THA)	1:05.68	
15	3	Chantal Liew (SGP)	1:05.68	
17	2	Bisma Khan (PAK)	1:09.93	
18	3	Bayaryn Yesüi (MGL)	1:12.46	
19	1	Enkh-Amgalangiin Ariuntamir (MGL)	1:14.31	
20	2	Aishath Sausan (MDV)	1:18.96	
21	1	Aishath Hulva Khulail (MDV)	1:33.70	

=== Final ===
Rank	Athlete	Time	Notes
1st place, gold medalist(s)	Natsumi Sakai (JPN)	59.27	
2nd place, silver medalist(s)	Anna Konishi (JPN)	59.67	
3rd place, bronze medalist(s)	Chen Jie (CHN)	1:00.28	
4	Fu Yuanhui (CHN)	1:00.35	
5	Im Da-sol (KOR)	1:01.08	
6	Toto Wong (HKG)	1:02.12	
7	Shin Young-yeon (KOR)	1:02.84	
8	Yulduz Kuchkarova (UZB)	1:03.21	
