= Swimming at the 2018 Asian Games – Women's 50 metre backstroke =

Women's 50 metre backstroke at the 2018 Asian Games
- Venue: Gelora Bung Karno Aquatic Stadium
- Date: 21 August 2018
- Competitors: 23 from 13 nations

Medalists
gold medal	Liu Xiang	China
silver medal	Fu Yuanhui	China
bronze medal	Natsumi Sakai	Japan

The women's 50 metre backstroke event at the 2018 Asian Games took place on 21 August at the Gelora Bung Karno Aquatic Stadium.

== Schedule ==
All times are Western Indonesia Time (UTC+07:00)

Date	Time	Event
Tuesday, 21 August 2018	09:00	Heats
Tuesday, 21 August 2018	18:00	Final

== Records ==
Prior to this competition, the existing world, Asian and Games records were as follows.

World Record	Zhao Jing (CHN)	27.06	Rome, Italy	30 July 2009
Asian Record	Zhao Jing (CHN)	27.06	Rome, Italy	30 July 2009
Games Record	Gao Chang (CHN)	27.45	Guangzhou, China	15 November 2010

== Results ==
=== Heats ===
Rank	Heat	Athlete	Time	Notes
1	2	Liu Xiang (CHN)	27.83	
2	3	Fu Yuanhui (CHN)	28.12	
3	1	Natsumi Sakai (JPN)	28.25	
4	2	Park Han-byeol (KOR)	28.69	
4	3	Anna Konishi (JPN)	28.69	
6	3	Stephanie Au (HKG)	28.81	
7	2	Toto Wong (HKG)	28.94	
8	1	Shin Young-yeon (KOR)	29.10	
9	1	Yulduz Kuchkarova (UZB)	29.50	
10	1	Erica Vong (MAC)	29.87	
11	2	Hoong En Qi (SGP)	29.90	
12	2	Nurul Fajar Fitriyati (INA)	29.91	
13	3	Saovanee Boonamphai (THA)	30.08	
14	3	Anak Agung Istri Kania Ratih (INA)	30.32	
15	3	Chantal Liew (SGP)	30.47	
16	2	Araya Wongvat (THA)	30.82	
17	1	Bisma Khan (PAK)	31.53	
18	1	Bayaryn Yesüi (MGL)	33.61	
19	3	Enkh-Amgalangiin Ariuntamir (MGL)	33.98	
20	2	Miraal Zahra Haque (PAK)	34.62	
21	3	Aishath Sausan (MDV)	36.50	
22	1	Sompathana Chamberlain (LAO)	39.18	
23	2	Aishath Hulva Khulail (MDV)	41.83	

=== Final ===
Rank	Athlete	Time	Notes
1st place, gold medalist(s)	Liu Xiang (CHN)	26.98	WR
2nd place, silver medalist(s)	Fu Yuanhui (CHN)	27.68	
3rd place, bronze medalist(s)	Natsumi Sakai (JPN)	27.91	
4	Anna Konishi (JPN)	28.37	
5	Park Han-byeol (KOR)	28.39	
6	Stephanie Au (HKG)	28.70	
7	Shin Young-yeon (KOR)	28.85	
8	Toto Wong (HKG)	29.02	
