= Swimming at the 2014 Asian Games – Women's 200 metre backstroke =

Women's 200 metre backstroke at the 2014 Asian Games
- Venue: Munhak Park Tae-hwan Aquatics Center
- Date: 26 September 2014
- Competitors: 14 from 10 nations

Medalists
| gold medal | Sayaka Akase | Japan |
| silver medal | Chen Jie | China |
| bronze medal | Nguyễn Thị Ánh Viên | Vietnam |

The women's 200 metre backstroke event at the 2014 Asian Games took place on 26 September 2014 at Munhak Park Tae-hwan Aquatics Center.

== Schedule ==
All times are Korea Standard Time (UTC+09:00)

| Date | Time | Event |
|---|---|---|
| Friday, 26 September 2014 | 09:00 | Heats |
| Friday, 26 September 2014 | 19:24 | Final |

== Records ==
Prior to this competition, the existing world, Asian and Games records were as follows.

| World Record | Missy Franklin (USA) | 2:04.06 | London, United Kingdom | 3 August 2012 |
| Asian Record | Zhao Jing (CHN) | 2:06.46 | Guangzhou, China | 14 November 2010 |
| Games Record | Zhao Jing (CHN) | 2:06.46 | Guangzhou, China | 14 November 2010 |

== Results ==
=== Heats ===
| Rank | Heat | Athlete | Time | Notes |
|---|---|---|---|---|
| 1 | 2 | Sayaka Akase (JPN) | 2:11.35 | |
| 2 | 1 | Chen Jie (CHN) | 2:12.93 | |
| 3 | 2 | Marie Kamimura (JPN) | 2:13.83 | |
| 4 | 2 | Nguyễn Thị Ánh Viên (VIE) | 2:13.96 | |
| 5 | 1 | Claudia Lau (HKG) | 2:14.32 | |
| 6 | 1 | Fu Yuanhui (CHN) | 2:14.53 | |
| 7 | 2 | Lee Do-ryun (KOR) | 2:15.17 | |
| 8 | 1 | Lee Da-lin (KOR) | 2:16.30 | |
| 9 | 1 | Stephanie Au (HKG) | 2:20.49 | |
| 10 | 2 | Hsu An (TPE) | 2:20.51 | |
| 11 | 2 | Yulduz Kuchkarova (UZB) | 2:20.78 | |
| 12 | 1 | Tan Jing E (SIN) | 2:25.82 | |
| 13 | 2 | Erica Vong (MAC) | 2:26.86 | |
| 14 | 1 | Bayaryn Yesüi (MGL) | 2:47.79 | |

=== Final ===
| Rank | Athlete | Time | Notes |
|---|---|---|---|
| 1st place, gold medalist(s) | Sayaka Akase (JPN) | 2:10.31 | |
| 2nd place, silver medalist(s) | Chen Jie (CHN) | 2:10.53 | |
| 3rd place, bronze medalist(s) | Nguyễn Thị Ánh Viên (VIE) | 2:12.25 | |
| 4 | Marie Kamimura (JPN) | 2:13.14 | |
| 5 | Claudia Lau (HKG) | 2:14.23 | |
| 6 | Lee Do-ryun (KOR) | 2:14.69 | |
| 7 | Lee Da-lin (KOR) | 2:15.54 | |
| 8 | Fu Yuanhui (CHN) | 2:20.46 | |
