= Swimming at the 2018 Asian Games – Women's 200 metre backstroke =

Women's 200 metre backstroke at the 2018 Asian Games
- Venue: Gelora Bung Karno Aquatic Stadium
- Date: 19 August 2018
- Competitors: 18 from 12 nations

Medalists
gold medal	Liu Yaxin	China
silver medal	Natsumi Sakai	Japan
bronze medal	Peng Xuwei	China

The women's 200 metre backstroke event at the 2018 Asian Games took place on 19 August at the Gelora Bung Karno Aquatic Stadium.

== Schedule ==
All times are Western Indonesia Time (UTC+07:00)

Date	Time	Event
Sunday, 19 August 2018	09:40	Heats
Sunday, 19 August 2018	18:38	Final

== Records ==
Prior to this competition, the existing world, Asian and Games records were as follows.

World Record	Missy Franklin (USA)	2:04.06	London, United Kingdom	3 August 2012
Asian Record	Zhao Jing (CHN)	2:06.46	Guangzhou, China	14 November 2010
Games Record	Zhao Jing (CHN)	2:06.46	Guangzhou, China	14 November 2010

== Results ==
=== Heats ===
Rank	Heat	Athlete	Time	Notes
1	1	Liu Yaxin (CHN)	2:09.52	
2	3	Peng Xuwei (CHN)	2:11.39	
3	2	Im Da-sol (KOR)	2:12.24	
4	3	Sayaka Akase (JPN)	2:12.25	
5	2	Natsumi Sakai (JPN)	2:12.30	
6	2	Toto Wong (HKG)	2:15.98	
7	3	Nurul Fajar Fitriyati (INA)	2:18.64	
8	1	Roxanne Yu (PHI)	2:19.12	
9	2	Natalie Kan (HKG)	2:19.73	
10	1	Yulduz Kuchkarova (UZB)	2:20.04	
11	1	Yessy Yosaputra (INA)	2:20.44	
12	3	Elizaveta Rogozhnikova (KGZ)	2:21.67	
13	1	Chantal Liew (SGP)	2:25.88	
14	3	Hoong En Qi (SGP)	2:26.30	
15	3	Miraal Zahra Haque (PAK)	2:39.36	
16	1	Bayaryn Yesüi (MGL)	2:41.07	
17	2	Enkh-Amgalangiin Ariuntamir (MGL)	2:47.80	
18	2	Aishath Sausan (MDV)	2:57.91	

=== Final ===
Rank	Athlete	Time	Notes
1st place, gold medalist(s)	Liu Yaxin (CHN)	2:07.65	
2nd place, silver medalist(s)	Natsumi Sakai (JPN)	2:08.13	
3rd place, bronze medalist(s)	Peng Xuwei (CHN)	2:09.14	
4	Sayaka Akase (JPN)	2:10.35	
5	Im Da-sol (KOR)	2:13.66	
6	Toto Wong (HKG)	2:14.68	
7	Nurul Fajar Fitriyati (INA)	2:19.38	
8	Roxanne Yu (PHI)	2:21.25	
