= Swimming at the 2018 Asian Games – Women's 100 metre breaststroke =

Women's 100 metre breaststroke at the 2018 Asian Games
- Venue: Gelora Bung Karno Aquatic Stadium
- Date: 19 August 2018
- Competitors: 26 from 18 nations

Medalists
gold medal	Satomi Suzuki	Japan
silver medal	Reona Aoki	Japan
bronze medal	Shi Jinglin	China

The women's 100 metre breaststroke event at the 2018 Asian Games took place on 19 August at the Gelora Bung Karno Aquatic Stadium.

== Schedule ==
All times are Western Indonesia Time (UTC+07:00)

Date	Time	Event
Sunday, 19 August 2018	10:05	Heats
Sunday, 19 August 2018	19:11	Final

== Records ==
Prior to this competition, the existing world, Asian and Games records were as follows.

World Record	Lilly King (USA)	1:04.13	Budapest, Hungary	25 July 2017
Asian Record	Ji Liping (CHN)	1:05.32	Beijing, China	29 August 2009
Games Record	Shi Jinglin (CHN)	1:06.67	Incheon, South Korea	21 September 2014

== Results ==
=== Heats ===
Rank	Heat	Athlete	Time	Notes
1	3	Satomi Suzuki (JPN)	1:06.92	
2	4	Reona Aoki (JPN)	1:07.24	
3	4	Shi Jinglin (CHN)	1:07.68	
4	3	Jamie Yeung (HKG)	1:07.86	
5	2	Yu Jingyao (CHN)	1:08.52	
6	3	Kim Hye-jin (KOR)	1:08.64	
7	4	Phee Jinq En (MAS)	1:08.83	
8	2	Back Su-yeon (KOR)	1:09.08	
9	3	Lin Pei-wun (TPE)	1:09.63	
10	4	Anandia Evato (INA)	1:09.78	
11	2	Rainbow Ip (HKG)	1:10.57	
12	2	Samantha Yeo (SGP)	1:11.29	
13	4	Roanne Ho (SGP)	1:12.01	
14	3	Saovanee Boonamphai (THA)	1:12.77	
15	1	Adelaida Pchelintseva (KAZ)	1:14.26	
16	1	Azzahra Permatahani (INA)	1:14.43	
17	2	Ngô Thị Ngọc Quỳnh (VIE)	1:15.19	
17	4	Cheang Weng Lam (MAC)	1:15.19	
19	1	Lei On Kei (MAC)	1:16.06	
20	3	Sok Voleak (CAM)	1:17.35	
21	4	Mera Abushammaleh (PLE)	1:20.70	
22	3	Mishael Aisha Ayub (PAK)	1:22.59	
23	2	Temüüjingiin Amingoo (MGL)	1:23.69	
24	2	Khadiza Akter (BAN)	1:27.20	
25	4	Aishath Hulva Khulail (MDV)	1:33.31	
26	3	Aishath Sajina (MDV)	1:34.07	

=== Final ===
Rank	Athlete	Time	Notes
1st place, gold medalist(s)	Satomi Suzuki (JPN)	1:06.40	GR
2nd place, silver medalist(s)	Reona Aoki (JPN)	1:06.45	
3rd place, bronze medalist(s)	Shi Jinglin (CHN)	1:07.36	
4	Yu Jingyao (CHN)	1:07.44	
5	Kim Hye-jin (KOR)	1:08.34	
6	Jamie Yeung (HKG)	1:08.75	
7	Back Su-yeon (KOR)	1:08.83	
8	Phee Jinq En (MAS)	1:09.01	
