= Swimming at the 2018 Asian Games – Women's 100 metre freestyle =

Women's 100 metre freestyle at the 2018 Asian Games
- Venue: Gelora Bung Karno Aquatic Stadium
- Date: 20 August 2018
- Competitors: 27 from 17 nations

Medalists
gold medal	Rikako Ikee	Japan
silver medal	Zhu Menghui	China
bronze medal	Yang Junxuan	China

The women's 100 metre freestyle event at the 2018 Asian Games took place on 20 August at the Gelora Bung Karno Aquatic Stadium.

== Schedule ==
All times are Western Indonesia Time (UTC+07:00)

Date	Time	Event
Monday, 20 August 2018	09:33	Heats
Monday, 20 August 2018	18:43	Final

== Records ==
Prior to this competition, the existing world, Asian and Games records were as follows.

World Record	Sarah Sjöström (SWE)	51.71	Budapest, Hungary	23 July 2017
Asian Record	Rikako Ikee (JPN)	53.03	Tokyo, Japan	8 April 2018
Games Record	Rikako Ikee (JPN)	53.60	Jakarta, Indonesia	19 August 2018

== Results ==
=== Heats ===
Rank	Heat	Athlete	Time	Notes
1	4	Rikako Ikee (JPN)	54.33	
2	2	Zhu Menghui (CHN)	54.67	
3	4	Tomomi Aoki (JPN)	55.57	
4	3	Yang Junxuan (CHN)	55.78	
5	2	Ko Mi-so (KOR)	56.35	
6	4	Jasmine Al-Khaldi (PHI)	56.38	
7	3	Camille Cheng (HKG)	56.47	
8	3	Kornkarnjana Sapianchai (THA)	56.49	
9	2	Christie Chue (SGP)	56.91	
10	2	Tinky Ho (HKG)	57.06	
11	4	Cherlyn Yeoh (SGP)	57.39	
12	3	Patricia Yosita Hapsari (INA)	57.40	
13	3	Kim Min-ju (KOR)	57.62	
14	4	Natthanan Junkrajang (THA)	57.87	
15	2	Elizaveta Rogozhnikova (KGZ)	58.38	
16	4	Tan Chi Yan (MAC)	59.62	
17	3	Batbayaryn Enkhkhüslen (MGL)	1:00.13	
18	2	Gaurika Singh (NEP)	1:00.82	
19	4	Long Chi Wai (MAC)	1:02.07	
20	2	Khuyagbaataryn Enkhzul (MGL)	1:02.19	
21	3	Bisma Khan (PAK)	1:02.85	
22	4	Tisa Shakya (NEP)	1:03.96	
23	1	Dania Nour (PLE)	1:07.11	
24	1	Anmau Ahmed Saleem (MDV)	1:14.64	
25	1	Imelda Ximenes Belo (TLS)	1:16.91	
26	2	Aishath Sajina (MDV)	1:17.91	
27	3	Anastasiya Tyurina (TJK)	1:19.50	

=== Final ===
Rank	Athlete	Time	Notes
1st place, gold medalist(s)	Rikako Ikee (JPN)	53.27	GR
2nd place, silver medalist(s)	Zhu Menghui (CHN)	53.56	
3rd place, bronze medalist(s)	Yang Junxuan (CHN)	54.17	
4	Tomomi Aoki (JPN)	54.58	
5	Camille Cheng (HKG)	55.39	
6	Ko Mi-so (KOR)	56.07	
7	Jasmine Al-Khaldi (PHI)	56.29	
8	Kornkarnjana Sapianchai (THA)	56.85	
