= Swimming at the 2018 Asian Games – Women's 50 metre freestyle =

Asian Games swimming competition

Women's 50 metre freestyle at the 2018 Asian Games
- Venue: Gelora Bung Karno Aquatic Stadium
- Date: 24 August 2018
- Competitors: 32 from 19 nations

Medalists
| gold medal | Rikako Ikee | Japan |
| silver medal | Liu Xiang | China |
| bronze medal | Wu Qingfeng | China |

The women's 50 metre freestyle event at the 2018 Asian Games took place on 24 August at the Gelora Bung Karno Aquatic Stadium.

== Schedule ==
All times are Western Indonesia Time (UTC+07:00)

| Date | Time | Event |
|---|---|---|
| Friday, 24 August 2018 | 09:00 | Heats |
| Friday, 24 August 2018 | 18:00 | Final |

== Records ==
Prior to this competition, the existing world, Asian and Games records were as follows.

| World Record | Sarah Sjöström (SWE) | 23.67 | Budapest, Hungary | 29 July 2017 |
| Asian Record | Liu Xiang (CHN) | 24.04 | Tianjin, China | 6 September 2017 |
| Games Record | Chen Xinyi (CHN) | 24.87 | Incheon, South Korea | 26 September 2014 |

== Results ==
Legend

- DNS — Did not start

=== Heats ===
| Rank | Heat | Athlete | Time | Notes |
|---|---|---|---|---|
| 1 | 4 | Rikako Ikee (JPN) | 25.09 | |
| 2 | 3 | Liu Xiang (CHN) | 25.14 | |
| 3 | 2 | Wu Qingfeng (CHN) | 25.47 | |
| 4 | 4 | Mayuka Yamamoto (JPN) | 25.53 | |
| 5 | 2 | Quah Ting Wen (SGP) | 25.65 | |
| 6 | 3 | Amanda Lim (SGP) | 25.73 | |
| 7 | 4 | Kim Min-ju (KOR) | 25.83 | |
| 8 | 4 | Stephanie Au (HKG) | 26.04 | |
| 9 | 3 | Jenjira Srisa-ard (THA) | 26.09 | |
| 10 | 2 | Tam Hoi Lam (HKG) | 26.18 | |
| 11 | 3 | Ko Mi-so (KOR) | 26.19 | |
| 12 | 2 | Jasmine Al-Khaldi (PHI) | 26.20 | |
| 13 | 1 | Anak Agung Istri Kania Ratih (INA) | 26.23 | |
| 14 | 3 | Manita Sathianchokwisan (THA) | 26.35 | |
| 15 | 2 | Lei On Kei (MAC) | 26.66 | |
| 16 | 3 | Pak Mi-song (PRK) | 27.07 | |
| 17 | 2 | Tan Chi Yan (MAC) | 27.17 | |
| 18 | 4 | Patricia Yosita Hapsari (INA) | 27.25 | |
| 19 | 2 | Bisma Khan (PAK) | 28.08 | |
| 20 | 4 | Batbayaryn Enkhkhüslen (MGL) | 28.23 | |
| 21 | 3 | Gaurika Singh (NEP) | 28.50 | |
| 22 | 4 | Khuyagbaataryn Enkhzul (MGL) | 28.98 | |
| 23 | 3 | Tisa Shakya (NEP) | 29.61 | |
| 24 | 1 | Dania Nour (PLE) | 30.82 | |
| 25 | 1 | Siri Arun Budcharern (LAO) | 31.41 | |
| 26 | 2 | Mera Abushammaleh (PLE) | 31.69 | |
| 27 | 1 | Aishath Sausan (MDV) | 31.95 | |
| 28 | 1 | Khadiza Akter (BAN) | 31.96 | |
| 29 | 1 | Sompathana Chamberlain (LAO) | 32.06 | |
| 30 | 1 | Aishath Sajina (MDV) | 33.50 | |
| 31 | 1 | Imelda Ximenes Belo (TLS) | 34.21 | |
| — | 4 | Karina Klimyk (TJK) | DNS | |

=== Final ===
| Rank | Athlete | Time | Notes |
|---|---|---|---|
| 1st place, gold medalist(s) | Rikako Ikee (JPN) | 24.53 | GR |
| 2nd place, silver medalist(s) | Liu Xiang (CHN) | 24.60 | |
| 3rd place, bronze medalist(s) | Wu Qingfeng (CHN) | 24.87 | |
| 4 | Mayuka Yamamoto (JPN) | 25.45 | |
| 5 | Amanda Lim (SGP) | 25.47 | |
| 6 | Quah Ting Wen (SGP) | 25.48 | |
| 7 | Kim Min-ju (KOR) | 25.81 | |
| 8 | Stephanie Au (HKG) | 25.86 | |
