= Maldives at the 2018 Asian Games =

- IOC code: MDV
- NOC: Maldives Olympic Committee
- Website: www.nocmaldives.org (in English)

in Jakarta and Palembang August 18 – September 2
- Medals: Gold 0 Silver 0 Bronze 0 Total 0

Asian Games appearances (overview)
- 1982; 1986; 1990; 1994; 1998; 2002; 2006; 2010; 2014; 2018; 2022; 2026

Maldives competed at the 2018 Asian Games in Jakarta and Palembang, Indonesia, from 18 August to 2 September 2018.

== Competitors ==
The following is a list of the number of competitors representing Maldives that participated at the Games:

Sport	Men	Women	Total
Athletics	2	2	4
Badminton	4	4	8
Football	0	20	20
Shooting	3	2	5
Swimming	4	4	8
Table tennis	4	0	4
Tennis	4	3	7
Volleyball	18	0	18
Total	39	35	74

== Athletics ==
Maldives entered four athletes (2 men's and 2 women's) to participate in the athletics competition at the Games.

== Badminton ==
Men

Athlete	Event	Round of 64	Round of 32	Round of 16	Quarterfinals	Semifinals	Final	
Athlete	Event	Opposition Score	Opposition Score	Opposition Score	Opposition Score	Opposition Score	Opposition Score	Rank
Mohamed Ajfan Rasheed	Singles	Bye	Ng K L (HKG); L (9–21, 10–21)	did not advance				
Hussein Zayan Shaheed	Singles	Bye	S I Meri (AFG); W (22–20, 21–11)	K Nishimoto (JPN); L (7–21, 10–21)	did not advance			
Thoif Ahmed Mohamed; Mohamed Ajfan Rasheed	Doubles	—N/a	M Attri / B S Reddy (IND); L (10–21, 8–21)	did not advance				
Sarim Mohamed; Hussein Zayan Shaheed	Doubles	—N/a	Lee J-h / Lee Y (TPE); L (4–21, 7–21)	did not advance				
Hussein Zayan Shaheed; Mohamed Ajfan Rasheed; Sarim Mohamed; Thoif Ahmed Mohamed	Team	—N/a		India (IND); L 0–3	did not advance			

Women

Athlete	Event	Round of 32	Round of 16	Quarterfinals	Semifinals	Final	
Athlete	Event	Opposition Score	Opposition Score	Opposition Score	Opposition Score	Opposition Score	Rank
Moosa Aminath Shahurunaz	Singles	N Okuhara (JPN); L (2–21, 5–21)	did not advance				
Fathimath Nabaaha Abdul Razzaq	Singles	N Tamang (NEP); L (19–21, 15–21)	did not advance				
Aminath Nabeeha Abdul Razzaq; Fathimath Nabaaha Abdul Razzaq	Doubles	D D Haris / R A Pradipta (INA); L (6–21, 4–21)	did not advance				
Neela Najeeb; Moosa Aminath Shahurunaz	Doubles	G Saddique / S Waqas (PAK); L (20–22, 21–18, 15–21)	did not advance				
Aminath Nabeeha Abdul Razzaq; Fathimath Nabaaha Abdul Razzaq; Moosa Aminath Shahurunaz; Neela Najeeb	Team	—N/a	Nepal (NEP); W 3–2	China (CHN); L 0–3	did not advance		

Mixed

Athlete	Event	Round of 32	Round of 16	Quarterfinals	Semifinals	Final	
Athlete	Event	Opposition Score	Opposition Score	Opposition Score	Opposition Score	Opposition Score	Rank
Thoif Ahmed Mohamed; Fathimath Nabaaha Abdul Razzaq	Mixed	Seo S-j / Chae Y-j (KOR); L (2–21, 6–21)	did not advance				
Sarim Mohamed; Moosa Aminath Shahurunaz	Mixed	Che P N / Gong X X (MAC); L (8–21, 8–21)	did not advance				

== Football ==
Maldives women's team were drawn in the Group A at the Games.

Summary

Team	Event	Group Stage				Quarterfinal	Semifinal	Final / BM	
Team	Event	Opposition score	Opposition score	Opposition score	Rank	Opposition score	Opposition score	Opposition score	Rank
Maldives women's	Women's tournament	Indonesia; L 0–6	South Korea; L 0–8	Chinese Taipei; L 0–7	4	did not advance			10

=== Women's tournament ===
Roster

The following is the Maldives squad in the women's football tournament of the 2018 Asian Games.

Head Coach: Athif Mohamed

No.	Pos.	Player	Date of birth (age)	Caps	Goals	Club
1	GK	Aminath Leeza	25 November 1986 (aged 31)			(Football Association of Maldives) Police Club
18	GK	Aishath Abdul Razzaq	20 October 1980 (aged 37)			
22	GK	Saiga Hussain	26 March 1993 (aged 25)			(Football Association of Maldives) MNDF
2	DF	Fathimath Zahira	31 March 1991 (aged 27)			(Football Association of Maldives) Police Club
4	DF	Aishath Maahin	6 August 1988 (aged 30)			(Football Association of Maldives) Ooredoo Maldives
6	DF	Fathimath Afza	1 November 1988 (aged 29)			(Football Association of Maldives) Dhivehi Sifainge Club
15	DF	Aminath Zaahiya	11 July 1993 (aged 25)			(Football Association of Maldives) Team Fenaka
17	DF	Hawwa Haneefa	31 January 1990 (aged 28)			(Football Association of Maldives) WAMCO
19	DF	Sheeneez Mohamed	25 November 1986 (aged 31)			(Football Association of Maldives) Police Club
21	DF	Sanfa Ibrahim Didi	27 April 1985 (aged 33)			(Football Association of Maldives) Police Club
5	MF	Shiyana Ahmed Zubair	1 January 1988 (aged 30)			(Football Association of Maldives) STO
7	MF	Fadhuwa Zahir	7 May 1986 (aged 32)			(Football Association of Maldives) Police Club
9	MF	Shahula Thaufeeq	8 December 1992 (aged 25)			(Football Association of Maldives) Team Fenaka
11	MF	Aishath Samaa	26 March 1994 (aged 24)			(Football Association of Maldives) New Radiant
14	MF	Mariyam Mirfath	16 May 1985 (aged 33)			(Football Association of Maldives) Club Immigration
24	MF	Azina Abdul Matheen	10 September 1991 (aged 26)			(Football Association of Maldives) Customs RC
8	FW	Mariyam Rifa	29 August 1992 (aged 25)			(Football Association of Maldives) MPL
10	FW	Aminath Shamila	14 May 1993 (aged 25)			(Football Association of Maldives) MPL
12	FW	Mariyam Nishfa Faid	8 March 2002 (aged 16)			
13	FW	Safiyya Rafa	9 April 1998 (aged 20)			(Football Association of Maldives) WAMCO

Group A

Pos	Team	Pld	W	D	L	GF	GA	GD	Pts	Qualification
1	South Korea	3	3	0	0	22	1	+21	9	Advance to Knockout stage
2	Chinese Taipei	3	2	0	1	12	2	+10	6	Advance to Knockout stage
3	Indonesia (H)	3	1	0	2	6	16	−10	3	
4	Maldives	3	0	0	3	0	21	−21	0	

Source: Asian Games 2018
Rules for classification: Group stage tiebreakers
(H) Hosts
16 August 2018
18:30 UTC+7

Indonesia	6–0	Maldives
Musdalifah 10', 72'; Zp 15' (pen.), 55'; Sada 30'; Sari 61'	Report

Gelora Sriwijaya Stadium, Palembang
Referee: Thein Thein Aye (Myanmar)

19 August 2018
15:00 UTC+7

Maldives	0–8	South Korea
	Report	Ji So-yun 25' (pen.); Shamila 35' (o.g.); Son Hwa-yeon 35', 60', 87'; Moon Mi-ra 45', 54' (pen.); Lee Eun-mi 88'

Gelora Sriwijaya Stadium, Palembang
Referee: Law Bik Chi (Hong Kong)

21 August 2018
18:30 UTC+7

Chinese Taipei	7–0	Maldives
Yu Hsiu-chin 6' (pen.); Pan Shin-yu 12', 31'; Zhuo Li-ping 17', 74'; Michelle Pao 55'; Lee Hsiu-chin 63'	Report

Bumi Sriwijaya Stadium, Palembang
Referee: Pansa Chaisanit (Thailand)

== Shooting ==
Men

Athlete	Event	Qualification		Final	
Athlete	Event	Points	Rank	Points	Rank
Mohamed Abdulla	10 m air rifle	595.2	41	did not advance	
Ahmed Yaaniu	10 m air rifle	563.2	43	did not advance	
Mohamed Abdulla	50 m rifle three positions	1116	31	did not advance	
Ibrahim Ahmed	50 m rifle three positions	1060	32	did not advance	

Women

Athlete	Event	Qualification		Final	
Athlete	Event	Points	Rank	Points	Rank
Asma Hawwa	10 m air pistol	510	42	did not advance	
Riusha Mohamed	10 m air pistol	531	38	did not advance	
Asma Hawwa	25 m pistol	515	31	did not advance	
Riusha Mohamed	25 m pistol	535	30	did not advance	

== Swimming ==
Men

Athlete	Event	Heats		Final	
Athlete	Event	Time	Rank	Time	Rank
Imaan Ali	50 m freestyle	27.60	49	did not advance	
Imaan Ali	100 m freestyle	1:01.60	46	did not advance	
Imaan Ali	200 m freestyle	2:17.58	33	did not advance	
Imaan Ali	50 m backstroke	32.47	36	did not advance	
Imaan Ali	100 m backstroke	1:10.03	27	did not advance	
Imaan Ali	200 m backstroke	2:48.36	22	did not advance	
Ashraf Hassan	50 m freestyle	28.68	50	did not advance	
Ashraf Hassan	50 m breaststroke	36.32	36	did not advance	
Ashraf Hassan	100 m breaststroke	1:22.12	31	did not advance	
Haish Hassan Hussain	100 m freestyle	1:02.64	47	did not advance	
Haish Hassan Hussain	400 m freestyle	5:11.70	22	did not advance	
Haish Hassan Hussain	50 m backstroke	31.95	35	did not advance	
Haish Hassan Hussain	100 m backstroke	1:13.65	28	did not advance	
Haish Hassan Hussain	50 m breaststroke	35.85	35	did not advance	
Haish Hassan Hussain	100 m breaststroke	1:22.34	32	did not advance	
Mubal Azzam Ibrahim	200 m freestyle	2:11.26	30	did not advance	
Mubal Azzam Ibrahim	400 m freestyle	4:48.44	20	did not advance	
Mubal Azzam Ibrahim	800 m freestyle	—N/a		10:12.07	14
Mubal Azzam Ibrahim	1500 m freestyle	—N/a		19:26.54	15
Mubal Azzam Ibrahim	200 m individual medley	2:32.87	21	did not advance	
Mubal Azzam Ibrahim	400 m individual medley	5:35.41	17	did not advance	
Imaan Ali; Ashraf Hassan; Haish Hassan Hussain; Mubal Azzam Ibrahim	4×100 m freestyle relay	4:10.12	16	did not advance	
Imaan Ali; Ashraf Hassan; Haish Hassan Hussain; Mubal Azzam Ibrahim	4×100 m medley relay	4:47.94	17	did not advance	

Women

Athlete	Event	Heats		Final	
Athlete	Event	Time	Rank	Time	Rank
Aishath Hulva Khulail	50 m backstroke	41.83	23	did not advance	
Aishath Hulva Khulail	100 m backstroke	1:33.70	21	did not advance	
Aishath Hulva Khulail	50 m breaststroke	42.08	30	did not advance	
Aishath Hulva Khulail	100 m breaststroke	1:33.31	25	did not advance	
Aishath Hulva Khulail	200 m breaststroke	3:34.83	17	did not advance	
Aishath Sajna	50 m freestyle	33.50	30	did not advance	
Aishath Sajna	100 m freestyle	1:17.91	26	did not advance	
Aishath Sajna	50 m breaststroke	41.34	29	did not advance	
Aishath Sajna	100 m breaststroke	1:34.07	26	did not advance	
Anmau Ahmed Saleem	100 m freestyle	1:14.64	24	did not advance	
Anmau Ahmed Saleem	50 m butterfly	35.83	25	did not advance	
Anmau Ahmed Saleem	100 m butterfly	1:29.46	24	did not advance	
Anmau Ahmed Saleem	200 m butterfly	3:34.62	15	did not advance	
Aishath Sausan	50 m freestyle	31.95	27	did not advance	
Aishath Sausan	50 m backstroke	36.50	21	did not advance	
Aishath Sausan	100 m backstroke	1:18.96	20	did not advance	
Aishath Sausan	200 m backstroke	2:57.91	18	did not advance	
Aishath Sausan	50 m butterfly	34.40	23	did not advance	
Aishath Sausan	200 m individual medley	3:03.64	18	did not advance	
Aishath Sajina; Aishath Hulva Khulail; Anmau Ahmed Saleem; Aishath Sausan	4×100 m freestyle relay	5:09.90	10	did not advance	
Aishath Sajina; Aishath Hulva Khulail; Anmau Ahmed Saleem; Aishath Sausan	4×100 m medley relay	5:42.33	10	did not advance	

Mixed

Athlete	Event	Heats		Final	
Athlete	Event	Time	Rank	Time	Rank
Aishath Sausan; Aishath Sajina; Mubal Azzam Ibrahim; Imaan Ali	4x100 m mixed medley relay	5:06.67	12	did not advance	

== Table tennis ==
Individual

Athlete	Event	Round 1	Round 2	Round of 16	Quarterfinals	Semifinals	Final	
Athlete	Event	Opposition Score	Opposition Score	Opposition Score	Opposition Score	Opposition Score	Opposition Score	Rank
Ahmed Moosa Munsif	Men's singles	MA Haiqal (MAS); L 0–4	did not advance					
Ismail Mohamed Shaffan	Men's singles	FS Santoso (INA); L 0–4	did not advance					

Team

Athlete	Event	Group Stage					Quarterfinal	Semifinal	Final	
Athlete	Event	Opposition score	Opposition score	Opposition score	Opposition score	Rank	Opposition score	Opposition score	Opposition score	Rank
Ahmed Moosa Munsif; Ismail Mohamed Shaffan; Naseem Mohamed Zeesth; Sujau Mohamed Thabin	Men's	Japan (JPN); L 0–3	Thailand (THA); L 0–3	Iran (IRI); L 0–3	Kyrgyzstan (KGZ); L 1–3	5	did not advance			

== Tennis ==
Men

Athlete	Event	Round of 64	Round of 32	Round of 16	Quarterfinals	Semifinals	Final	
Athlete	Event	Opposition Score	Opposition Score	Opposition Score	Opposition Score	Opposition Score	Opposition Score	Rank
Ahmed Saai Waheed	Singles	Bye	Lý NH (VIE); L 0–6, 0–4^{r}	did not advance				
Abdulla Faaih Fazeel	Singles	S Dissanayake (SRI); L 1–6, 3–6	did not advance					
Abdulla Faaih Fazeel; Ahmed Saai Waheed	Doubles	DA Susanto / IA Susanto (INA); L 1–6, 0–6	did not advance					
Ahmed Akram; Ali Faris Mohammed	Doubles	Bye	Li Z / Wu D (CHN); L 0–6, 1–6	did not advance				

Women

Athlete	Event	Round of 64	Round of 32	Round of 16	Quarterfinals	Semifinals	Final	
Athlete	Event	Opposition Score	Opposition Score	Opposition Score	Opposition Score	Opposition Score	Opposition Score	Rank
Ayani Moosa Kaleem	Singles	Bye	G Ainitdinova (KAZ); L 0–6, 0–6	did not advance				
Zeina Abdul Rasheed	Singles	B Gumulya (INA); L 0–6, 0–6	did not advance					
Zeina Abdul Rasheed; Aminath Irufa Mahir	Doubles	—N/a	Mah Rana / May Rana (NEP); L 4–6, 1–6	did not advance				

Mixed

Athlete	Event	Round of 64	Round of 32	Round of 16	Quarterfinals	Semifinals	Final	
Athlete	Event	Opposition Score	Opposition Score	Opposition Score	Opposition Score	Opposition Score	Opposition Score	Rank
Ayani Moosa Kaleem; Abdulla Faaih Fazeel	Doubles	Kim N-r / Lee J-m (KOR); L 1–6, 0–6	did not advance					
Zeina Abdul Rasheed; Ahmed Saai Waheed	Doubles	Bye	Liang E-s / Peng H-y (TPE); L 0–6, 1–6	did not advance				

== Volleyball ==
=== Beach volleyball ===
Athlete	Event	Preliminary		Round of 16	Quarterfinals	Semifinals	Final / BM	
Athlete	Event	Oppositions Scores	Rank	Opposition Score	Opposition Score	Opposition Score	Opposition Score	Rank
Mohamed Ahmed; Asfag Adam	Men's tournament	Inkiew – Padsawud (THA): L 0–2; Chui – Yeung (HKG): L 0–2; Al-Jalbubi – Al-Hashmi (OMA): L 0–2	4	did not advance				
Sajid Ismail; Shiunaz Abdul Waahid	Men's tournament	Abdelrasoul – Sammoud (QAT): L 1–2; Vakili – Salemiinjehboroun (IRI): L 0–2; Jongklang – Khaolumtarn (THA): L 0–2	4	did not advance				

=== Indoor volleyball ===
Team	Event	Group Stage		Playoffs	Quarterfinals / Pl.	Semifinals / Pl.	Final / BM / Pl.	
Team	Event	Oppositions Scores	Rank	Opposition Score	Opposition Score	Opposition Score	Opposition Score	Rank
Maldives men's	Men's tournament	Qatar: L 0–3; Hong Kong: L 0–3; India: L 0–3	4	Did not advance	Sri Lanka; L 1–3	Did not advance	Hong Kong; L 0–3	20

==== Men's tournament ====
Team roster

The following is the Maldives roster in the men's volleyball tournament of the 2018 Asian Games.

Head coach: Sajid Mohamed

No.	Name	Date of birth	Height	Weight	Spike	Block	Club
1	Naeem Mohamed	15 October 1989	1.65 m (5 ft 5 in)	59 kg (130 lb)	254 cm (100 in)	246 cm (97 in)	
2	Abdul Latheef Shuaib	30 October 1993	1.76 m (5 ft 9 in)	65 kg (143 lb)	289 cm (114 in)	269 cm (106 in)	(Maldives) Police
3	Javam Ali	17 September 1994	1.75 m (5 ft 9 in)	70 kg (150 lb)	254 cm (100 in)	249 cm (98 in)	
4	Mauroof Ali	13 March 1987	1.72 m (5 ft 8 in)	69 kg (152 lb)	285 cm (112 in)	275 cm (108 in)	(Maldives) Maldivian Sport & Recreation
5	Mohamed Mimrah Hassan	19 January 1998	1.56 m (5 ft 1 in)	57 kg (126 lb)	240 cm (94 in)	237 cm (93 in)	Maldives Volleyball Family
6	Adam Fairooz	26 November 1994	1.88 m (6 ft 2 in)	73 kg (161 lb)	315 cm (124 in)	309 cm (122 in)	(Maldives) Maldivian Sport & Recreation
8	Mimrah Mohamed	15 April 1999	1.87 m (6 ft 2 in)	63 kg (139 lb)	243 cm (96 in)	231 cm (91 in)	(Maldives) Sea Life
4	Mauroof Ali	13 March 1987	1.72 m (5 ft 8 in)	69 kg (152 lb)	285 cm (112 in)	275 cm (108 in)	(Maldives) Maldivian Sport & Recreation
9	Shimau Ahmed	30 August 1991	1.75 m (5 ft 9 in)	69 kg (152 lb)	250 cm (98 in)	245 cm (96 in)	
10	Ahmed Abdul Kareem (c)	10 August 1986	1.89 m (6 ft 2 in)	80 kg (180 lb)	302 cm (119 in)	297 cm (117 in)	(Maldives) Dhivehi Sifainge
11	Nilaam Hassan	21 December 1995	1.85 m (6 ft 1 in)	59 kg (130 lb)	289 cm (114 in)	270 cm (110 in)	
12	Huzam Ali	6 May 1993	1.77 m (5 ft 10 in)	67 kg (148 lb)	310 cm (120 in)	300 cm (120 in)	(Maldives) STO
13	Visam Hussain	7 August 1994	1.76 m (5 ft 9 in)	67 kg (148 lb)	283 cm (111 in)	275 cm (108 in)	(Maldives) Maldivian Sport & Recreation
14	Naseem Adam	1 May 1992	1.70 m (5 ft 7 in)	70 kg (150 lb)	312 cm (123 in)	302 cm (119 in)	(Maldives) Maldivian Sport & Recreation

Pool F

Pos	Team	Pld	W	L	Pts	SW	SL	SR	SPW	SPL	SPR	Qualification
1	Qatar	3	3	0	9	9	0	MAX	225	143	1.573	Classification for 1–12
2	India	3	2	1	6	6	3	2.000	207	191	1.084	Classification for 1–12
3	Hong Kong	3	1	2	3	3	6	0.500	197	206	0.956	Classification for 13–20
4	Maldives	3	0	3	0	0	9	0.000	136	225	0.604	Classification for 13–20

Source: OCA

Date	Time		Score		Set 1	Set 2	Set 3	Set 4	Set 5	Total	Report
20 Aug	19:00	Qatar	3–0	Maldives	25–11	25–8	25–13			75–32	Report
23 Aug	19:00	Hong Kong	3–0	Maldives	25–16	25–21	25–17			75–54	Report
25 Aug	10:00	Maldives	0–3	India	12–25	21–25	17–25			50–75	Report
26 Aug	10:00	Sri Lanka	3–1	Maldives	16–25	25–18	27–25	25–15		93–83	Report
28 Aug	19:00	Maldives	0–3	Hong Kong	20–25	22–25	16–25			58–75	Report
