= Natsumi Sakai (swimmer) =

Japanese swimmer (born 2001)

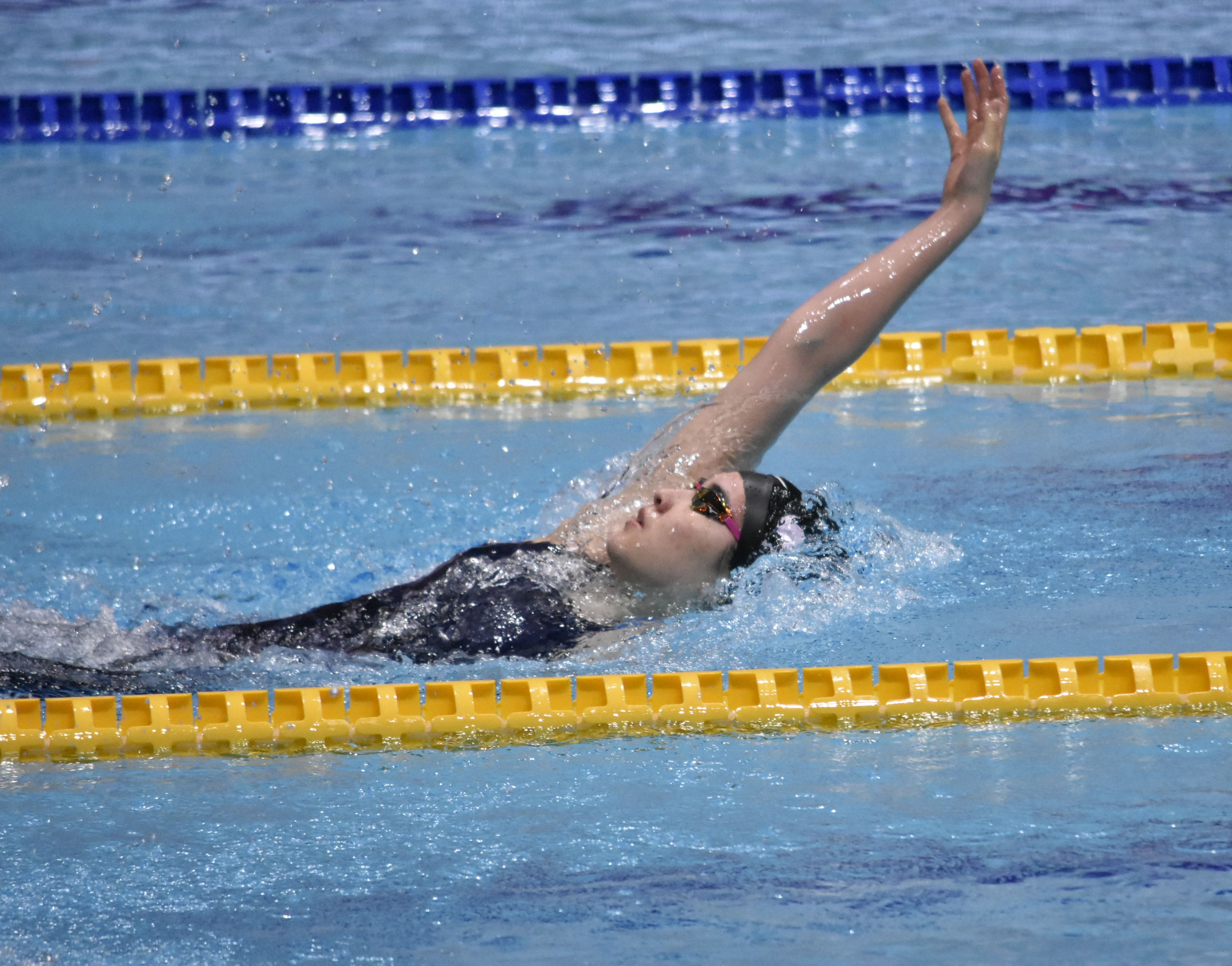
- Sakai in 2020

Personal information
- Born: 19 June 2001 (age 25) Saitama, Japan

Sport
- Sport: Swimming
- Strokes: backstroke, freestyle
Medal record
Representing Japan
Pan Pacific Championships
Bronze medal – third place	2018 Tokyo	4×100 m medley
Asian Games
Gold medal – first place	2018 Jakarta	100 m backstroke
Gold medal – first place	2018 Jakarta	4×100 m freestyle
Gold medal – first place	2018 Jakarta	4×100 m medley
Silver medal – second place	2018 Jakarta	200 m backstroke
Bronze medal – third place	2018 Jakarta	50 m backstroke
World Junior Championships
Gold medal – first place	2017 Indianapolis	50 m backstroke
Bronze medal – third place	2015 Singapore	4×100 m medley
Bronze medal – third place	2017 Indianapolis	200 m backstroke
Bronze medal – third place	2017 Indianapolis	4×100 m freestyle
Bronze medal – third place	2017 Indianapolis	4×100 m medley

Natsumi Sakai (酒井 夏海, Sakai Natsumi; born 19 June 2001) is a Japanese swimmer. She competed in the women's 100 metre backstroke event at the 2016 Summer Olympics. She qualified to represent Japan at the 2020 Summer Olympics.
