= Keita Sunama =

Japanese swimmer

Personal information
- Born: 8 May 1995 (age 31)

Sport
- Sport: Swimming
Medal record
Men's swimming
Representing Japan
Asian Games
Bronze medal – third place	2018 Jakarta	200 m backstroke
Junior Pan Pacific Championships
Silver medal – second place	2012 Honolulu	200 m backstroke
Silver medal – second place	2012 Honolulu	400 medley
Bronze medal – third place	2012 Honolulu	200 m medley

Keita Sunama (砂間敬太, Sunama Keita, born 8 May 1995) is a Japanese swimmer. He won the bronze medal in the men's 200 metre backstroke at the 2018 Asian Games held in Jakarta, Indonesia.

In 2019, he represented Japan at the World Aquatics Championships held in Gwangju, South Korea. He competed in the men's 200 metre backstroke event.

He represented Japan at the 2020 Summer Olympics in Tokyo, Japan. He competed in the men's 200 metre backstroke event.
