= Swimming at the 2018 Asian Games – Men's 200 metre backstroke =

Men's 200 metre backstroke at the 2018 Asian Games
- Venue: Gelora Bung Karno Aquatic Stadium
- Date: 23 August 2018
- Competitors: 22 from 14 nations

Medalists
gold medal	Xu Jiayu	China
silver medal	Ryosuke Irie	Japan
bronze medal	Keita Sunama	Japan

The men's 200 metre backstroke event at the 2018 Asian Games took place on 23 August at the Gelora Bung Karno Aquatic Stadium.

== Schedule ==
All times are Western Indonesia Time (UTC+07:00)

Date	Time	Event
Thursday, 23 August 2018	09:50	Heats
Thursday, 23 August 2018	19:00	Final

== Records ==
Prior to this competition, the existing world, Asian and Games records were as follows.

World Record	Aaron Peirsol (USA)	1:51.92	Rome, Italy	31 July 2009
Asian Record	Ryosuke Irie (JPN)	1:52.51	Rome, Italy	31 July 2009
Games Record	Ryosuke Irie (JPN)	1:53.26	Incheon, South Korea	25 September 2014

== Results ==
=== Heats ===
Rank	Heat	Athlete	Time	Notes
1	1	Li Guangyuan (CHN)	1:59.87	
2	3	Xu Jiayu (CHN)	2:00.53	
3	2	Ryosuke Irie (JPN)	2:01.74	
4	2	Lee Ju-ho (KOR)	2:01.88	
5	3	Keita Sunama (JPN)	2:02.64	
6	1	Quah Zheng Wen (SGP)	2:02.68	Withdrew
7	1	Srihari Nataraj (IND)	2:02.97	
8	3	Francis Fong (SGP)	2:03.35	
9	2	Ricky Anggawijaya (INA)	2:05.59	Advanced
10	2	Chuang Mu-lun (TPE)	2:06.56	
11	1	Cheung Yau Ming (HKG)	2:06.78	
12	2	Advait Page (IND)	2:06.85	
13	3	Chang Hou-chi (TPE)	2:07.58	
14	3	Marcus Mok (HKG)	2:10.37	
15	1	Paul Lê Nguyễn (VIE)	2:10.64	
16	2	Akalanka Peiris (SRI)	2:12.14	
17	1	Abdulaziz Al-Obaidly (QAT)	2:13.92	
18	1	Boldbaataryn Buyantogtokh (MGL)	2:21.49	
19	2	Kawas Behram Aga (PAK)	2:22.41	
20	1	Erdenemönkhiin Demüül (MGL)	2:24.64	
21	3	Mesalam Al-Nabit (QAT)	2:24.94	
22	3	Ali Imaan (MDV)	2:48.36	

=== Final ===
Rank	Athlete	Time	Notes
1st place, gold medalist(s)	Xu Jiayu (CHN)	1:53.99	
2nd place, silver medalist(s)	Ryosuke Irie (JPN)	1:55.11	
3rd place, bronze medalist(s)	Keita Sunama (JPN)	1:55.54	
4	Li Guangyuan (CHN)	1:57.13	
5	Lee Ju-ho (KOR)	1:59.88	
6	Srihari Nataraj (IND)	2:02.83	
7	Ricky Anggawijaya (INA)	2:04.60	
8	Francis Fong (SGP)	2:06.16	
