= Swimming at the 2018 Asian Games – Women's 50 metre butterfly =

Women's 50 metre butterfly at the 2018 Asian Games
- Venue: Gelora Bung Karno Aquatic Stadium
- Date: 20 August 2018
- Competitors: 27 from 16 nations

Medalists
gold medal	Rikako Ikee	Japan
silver medal	Wang Yichun	China
bronze medal	Lin Xintong	China

The women's 50 metre butterfly event at the 2018 Asian Games took place on 20 August at the Gelora Bung Karno Aquatic Stadium.

== Schedule ==
All times are Western Indonesia Time (UTC+07:00)

Date	Time	Event
Monday, 20 August 2018	09:13	Heats
Monday, 20 August 2018	18:13	Final

== Records ==
Prior to this competition, the existing world, Asian and Games records were as follows.

World Record	Sarah Sjöström (SWE)	24.43	Borås, Sweden	5 July 2014
Asian Record	Rikako Ikee (JPN)	25.11	Canet-en-Roussillon, France	10 June 2018
Games Record	Lu Ying (CHN)	25.83	Incheon, South Korea	22 September 2014

== Results ==
=== Heats ===
Rank	Heat	Athlete	Time	Notes
1	4	Rikako Ikee (JPN)	25.91	
2	2	Lin Xintong (CHN)	26.56	
3	3	Wang Yichun (CHN)	26.68	
4	3	Park Ye-rin (KOR)	26.72	
5	2	Huang Mei-chien (TPE)	26.98	
6	2	An Se-hyeon (KOR)	27.01	
7	2	Chan Kin Lok (HKG)	27.24	
8	4	Quah Ting Wen (SGP)	27.28	
9	4	Quah Jing Wen (SGP)	27.31	
10	3	Chen Yu-rong (TPE)	27.35	
11	4	Ai Soma (JPN)	27.40	
12	1	Jenjira Srisa-ard (THA)	27.54	
13	3	Kornkarnjana Sapianchai (THA)	27.70	
14	4	Sze Hang Yu (HKG)	27.74	
15	3	Anak Agung Istri Kania Ratih (INA)	28.25	
16	1	Adinda Larasati Dewi (INA)	28.77	
17	2	Kuan I Cheng (MAC)	29.83	
18	2	Bisma Khan (PAK)	30.02	
19	3	Mishael Aisha Ayub (PAK)	32.22	
20	3	Anastasiya Tyurina (TJK)	32.53	
21	4	Altanshagain Kherlen (MGL)	32.85	
22	4	Karina Klimyk (TJK)	33.94	
23	2	Aishath Sausan (MDV)	34.40	
24	4	Dania Nour (PLE)	34.66	
25	2	Anmau Ahmed Saleem (MDV)	35.83	
26	3	Sompathana Chamberlain (LAO)	36.82	
27	1	Imelda Ximenes Belo (TLS)	39.57	

=== Final ===
Rank	Athlete	Time	Notes
1st place, gold medalist(s)	Rikako Ikee (JPN)	25.55	GR
2nd place, silver medalist(s)	Wang Yichun (CHN)	26.03	
3rd place, bronze medalist(s)	Lin Xintong (CHN)	26.39	
4	Park Ye-rin (KOR)	26.53	
5	An Se-hyeon (KOR)	26.67	
6	Quah Ting Wen (SGP)	26.73	
7	Huang Mei-chien (TPE)	26.89	
8	Chan Kin Lok (HKG)	27.22	
