= Palestine at the 2018 Asian Games =

- IOC code: PLE
- NOC: Palestine Olympic Committee
- Website: www.poc.ps (in Arabic)

in Jakarta and Palembang August 18 – September 2
- Competitors: 46 in 12 sports
- Medals: Gold 0 Silver 0 Bronze 0 Total 0

Asian Games appearances (overview)
- 1990; 1994; 1998; 2002; 2006; 2010; 2014; 2018; 2022; 2026

Palestine competed in the 2018 Asian Games in Jakarta and Palembang, Indonesia from 18 August to 2 September 2018. Palestine have competed in the Asian Games since 1994 with only one entrant and won their first medal in 2002 Busan with a bronze in boxing. This event marks the eight Asian Games appearance for Palestine.

== Competitors ==
The following is a list of the number of competitors representing Palestine that participated at the Games:

Sport	Men	Women	Total
Athletics	2	1	3
Football	20	0	20
Ju-jitsu	3	0	3
Judo	1	0	1
Karate	4	0	4
Kurash	1	0	1
Swimming	3	2	5
Taekwondo	1	0	1
Triathlon	2	0	2
Volleyball	2	0	2
Weightlifting	2	0	2
Wrestling	2	0	2
Total	43	3	46

== Athletics ==
Palestine entered three athletes (2 men's and 1 women) to participate in the athletics competition at the Games.

== Football ==
Palestine participated in the men's team event at the 2018 Asian Games in Group A of the tournament.

Summary

Team	Event	Group Stage					Round of 16	Quarterfinal	Semifinal	Final / BM	
Team	Event	Opposition Score	Opposition Score	Opposition Score	Opposition Score	Rank	Opposition Score	Opposition Score	Opposition Score	Opposition Score	Rank
Palestine men's	Men's tournament	Chinese Taipei; D 0–0	Laos; W 2–1	Indonesia; W 2–1	Hong Kong; D 1–1	2 Q	Syria; L 0–1	did not advance			11

=== Men's tournament ===
The draw for the men's football event was held on 5 July 2018 initially with involving 24 teams. The teams seeded into four pots with six teams each classified in those pots. However the initial draw was scratched due to the omission of both UAE and Palestine due to the by mistakes of the game organisers. It was early proved that both of the football associations of Palestine and United Arab Emirates correctly submitted their participation form on time before the deadline. Due to these errors, the tournament's draw result was rescheduled and reconfirmed on 25 July 2018 with Palestine added to the Group A alongside hosts Indonesia and UAE was added to Group E.

However another redraw was held again for the men's football team event on 3 August 2018 due to the sudden withdrawal of Iraq national football team and it was decided to move either UAE or Palestine to Group C.

Roster

The following is the Palestine squad in the men's football tournament of the 2018 Asian Games. The team of 20 players was officially named on 8 August.

Head coach: Ayman Sandouqa

No.	Pos.	Player	Date of birth (age)	Club
1	GK	Ramzi Fakhouri	19 February 1996 (aged 22)	(Palestinian Football Association) Thaqafi Tulkarm
2	DF	Ahmed Qatmish	10 March 1998 (aged 20)	(Palestinian Football Association) Thaqafi Tulkarm
3	MF	Mohammed Bassim	3 July 1995 (aged 23)	(Palestinian Football Association) Shabab Al-Bireh
4	DF	Michel Termanini	8 May 1998 (aged 20)	(Swedish Football Association) AFC Eskilstuna
5	DF	Abdelatif Bahdari* (captain)	20 February 1984 (aged 34)	(Palestinian Football Association) Merkaz Balata
6	MF	Mohanad Fannoun	18 September 1995 (aged 22)	(Palestinian Football Association) Shabab Al-Khalil
7	MF	Mahmoud Abu Warda	31 May 1995 (aged 23)	(Palestinian Football Association) Markaz Balata
9	FW	Oday Dabbagh	3 December 1998 (aged 19)	(Palestinian Football Association) Hilal Al-Quds
10	FW	Mahmoud Yousef	30 July 1997 (aged 21)	(Palestinian Football Association) Shabab Al-Khalil
11	DF	Omar El-Sherif	13 February 1997 (aged 21)	(Egyptian Football Association) Wadi Degla
13	FW	Shehab Qumbor	10 August 1997 (aged 21)	(Palestinian Football Association) Jabal Al-Mukaber
14	DF	Yousef Al-Ashhab	10 February 1995 (aged 23)	(Palestinian Football Association) Shabab Al-Khalil
15	MF	Hani Abdallah	3 February 1998 (aged 20)	(Palestinian Football Association) Hilal Al-Quds
16	GK	Rami Hamadi*	24 March 1994 (aged 24)	(Palestinian Football Association) Hilal Al-Quds
18	FW	Mohammed Obaid	30 September 1998 (aged 19)	(Palestinian Football Association) Hilal Al-Quds
19	MF	Sameh Maraaba*	19 March 1992 (aged 26)	(Palestinian Football Association) Shabab Al-Khalil
20	FW	Mohamed Darwish	20 February 1997 (aged 21)	(German Football Association) Arminia Hannover
22	GK	Naim Abuaker	20 January 1995 (aged 23)	(Palestinian Football Association) Ahli Al-Khaleel
17	DF	Mousa Farawi	22 March 1998 (aged 20)	(Palestinian Football Association) Hilal Al-Quds
23	DF	Mohammed Khalil	5 April 1998 (aged 20)	(Palestinian Football Association) Hilal Ariha

* Over-aged player.

Group A

Pos	Team	Pld	W	D	L	GF	GA	GD	Pts	Qualification
1	Indonesia (H)	4	3	0	1	11	3	+8	9	Advance to knockout stage
2	Palestine	4	2	2	0	5	3	+2	8	Advance to knockout stage
3	Hong Kong	4	2	1	1	9	5	+4	7	Advance to knockout stage
4	Laos	4	1	0	3	4	8	−4	3	
5	Chinese Taipei	4	0	1	3	0	10	−10	1	

Source: Asian Games 2018
Rules for classification: Group stage tiebreakers
(H) Hosts
10 August 2018
19:00 UTC+7

Palestine	0–0	Chinese Taipei
	Report

Patriot Candrabhaga Stadium, Bekasi
Referee: Kim Dae-yong (South Korea)

12 August 2018
16:00 UTC+7

Palestine	2–1	Laos
Qumbor 83'; Bahdari 90+5'	Report	Khochalern 14'

Patriot Candrabhaga Stadium, Bekasi
Referee: Bijan Heidari (Iran)

15 August 2018
19:00 UTC+7

Indonesia	1–2	Palestine
Irfan 23'	Report	Dabbagh 16'; Darwish 51'

Patriot Candrabhaga Stadium, Bekasi
Referee: Nivon Robesh Gamini (Sri Lanka)

17 August 2018
16:00 UTC+7

Hong Kong	1–1	Palestine
Lam Ka Wai 57'	Report	Yousef 17'

Patriot Candrabhaga Stadium, Bekasi
Referee: Takuto Okabe (Japan)

Round of 16

23 August 2018
16:00 UTC+7

Palestine	0–1	Syria
	Report	Ashkar 73'

Patriot Candrabhaga Stadium, Bekasi
Referee: Ali Shaban (Kuwait)

== Ju-jitsu ==
Palestine entered the ju-jitsu competition with 3 men's athletes.

Key:

- ADV – Won by advantages.
- RDC – Won by referee decision.
- SUB – Won by submission.

Men

Athlete	Event	Round of 64	Round of 32	Round of 16	Quarterfinals	Semifinals	Repechage	Final / BM	Rank
Athlete	Event	Opposition Result	Opposition Result	Opposition Result	Opposition Result	Opposition Result	Opposition Result	Opposition Result	Rank
Mohammed Abdalhafiz	–77 kg	M Mumtaz (PAK); L 0–3	did not advance						
Qais Maraaba	–85 kg	—N/a	Bye	MH Radhi (UAE); W 2–0	A Murtazaliev (KGZ); L 0–100^{SUB}	Did not advance	M Joraýew (TKM); L 0–100^{SUB}	did not advance	
Mohammad Hasan	–94 kg	—N/a	Bye	I Juraev (UZB); DSQ	did not advance				

== Judo ==
Key:

- 1st number — Ippon
- 2nd number — Waza-ari
- s — Shido

Men

Athlete	Event	Round of 32	Round of 16	Quarterfinals	Semifinals	Repechage	Final / BM	Rank
Athlete	Event	Opposition Result	Opposition Result	Opposition Result	Opposition Result	Opposition Result	Opposition Result	Rank
Wesam Abu Rmilah	–81 kg	A Murodov (TJK); L 00s3–10	did not advance					

== Karate ==
Palestine participated in the karate competition at the Games with four men's athletes.

== Kurash ==
Men

Athlete	Event	Round of 32	Round of 16	Quarterfinal	Semifinal	Final	
Athlete	Event	Opposition Score	Opposition Score	Opposition Score	Opposition Score	Opposition Score	Rank
Mohanad Abu-Eida	–90 kg	Bye	D Sharma (IND); L 001−012	did not advance			

== Swimming ==
Men

Athlete	Event	Heats		Final	
Athlete	Event	Time	Rank	Time	Rank
Anas Altamari	50 m butterfly	27.56	37	did not advance	
Adam Barghouthi	100 m freestyle	1:01.09	45	did not advance	
Adam Barghouthi	200 m freestyle	2:15.07	31	did not advance	
Adam Barghouthi	400 m freestyle	4:45.98	19	did not advance	
Loiy Juwaihan	50 m freestyle	26.15	45	did not advance	

Women

Athlete	Event	Heats		Final	
Athlete	Event	Time	Rank	Time	Rank
Mera Abushammaleh	50 m freestyle	31.69	26	did not advance	
Mera Abushammaleh	50 m breaststroke	37.10	22	did not advance	
Mera Abushammaleh	100 m breaststroke	1:20.70	21	did not advance	
Mera Abushammaleh	200 m breaststroke	2:55.44	16	did not advance	
Dania Nour	50 m freestyle	30.82	24	did not advance	
Dania Nour	100 m freestyle	1:07.11	23	did not advance	
Dania Nour	50 m butterfly	34.66	24	did not advance	

== Taekwondo ==
Kyorugi

Athlete	Event	Round of 32	Round of 16	Quarterfinal	Semifinal	Final	
Athlete	Event	Opposition Score	Opposition Score	Opposition Score	Opposition Score	Opposition Score	Rank
Yousef Abu-Al-Rob	Men's −58 kg	Shihab Al-Arifi (YEM); W 64–23	Ali Asiri (KSA); L 32–36	did not advance			

== Triathlon ==
Individual

Athlete	Event	Swim (1.5 km)	Trans 1	Bike (39.6 km)	Trans 2	Run (10 km)	Total Time	Rank
Abdallah Abushabab	Men's	19:56	0:27	56:50	0:27	41:42	1:59:22	17
Omar Abushabab	Men's	21:33	0:28	56:20	0:22	43:11	2:01:55	18

== Volleyball ==
=== Beach volleyball ===
Athlete	Event	Preliminary		Round of 16	Quarterfinals	Semifinals	Final / BM	
Athlete	Event	Oppositions Scores	Rank	Opposition Score	Opposition Score	Opposition Score	Opposition Score	Rank
Khaled Alarqan; Mohammed Al-Qishawi	Men's tournament	Hossain – Ali (BAN): W 2–0; Ramadhan – Pribadi (INA): L 0–2; Lau – Wong (HKG): W 2–0	2 Q	Al-Jalbubi – Al-Hashmi (OMA); L 0–2	did not advance			

== Weightlifting ==
Men

Athlete	Event	Snatch		Clean & Jerk		Total	Rank
Athlete	Event	Result	Rank	Result	Rank	Total	Rank
Hani Alqassass	−77 kg	115	16	141	14	256	14
Ahmed Alqassass	−85 kg	105	10	150	10	255	10

== Wrestling ==
Palestine put up two men's wrestler competed in the freestyle event at the Games.

Key:

- F – Victory by fall.
- PP – Decision by points – the loser with technical points.
- PO – Decision by points – the loser without technical points.
- ST – Great superiority – the loser without technical points and a margin of victory of at least 8 (Greco-Roman) or 10 (freestyle) points.

Men's freestyle

Athlete	Event	Qualification	Round of 16	Quarterfinal	Semifinal	Repechage 1	Repechage 2	Final / BM	
Athlete	Event	Opposition Result	Opposition Result	Opposition Result	Opposition Result	Opposition Result	Opposition Result	Opposition Result	Rank
Mousa Jouda	−57 kg	S Okassov (KAZ); L 0–11	did not advance						21
Wael Al-Haj	−86 kg	R Kurbanov (UZB); L 0–10	did not advance						16

== See also ==
- Palestine at the 2017 Asian Indoor and Martial Arts Games
