= Dania Nour =

Palestinian swimmer (born 2003)

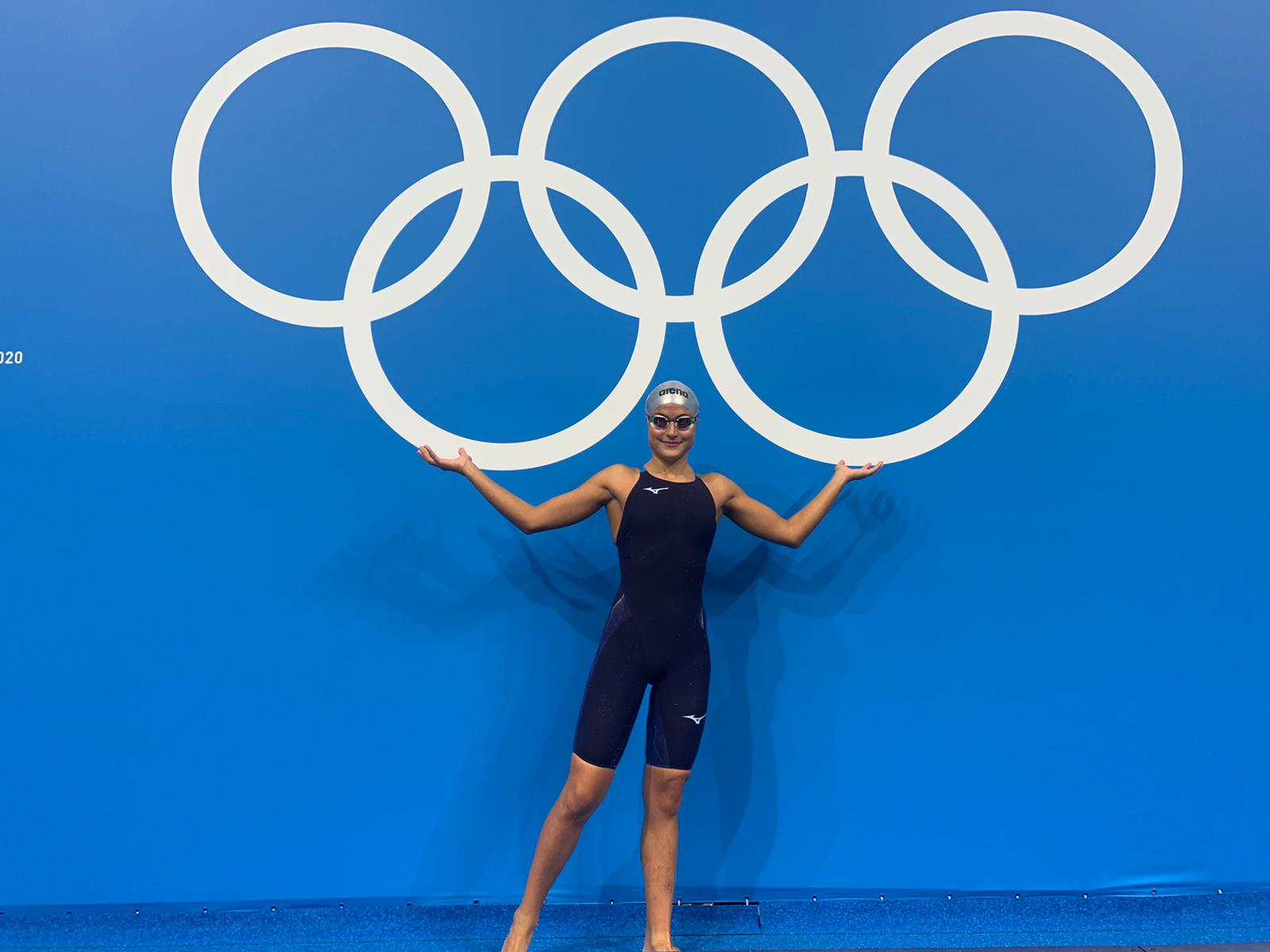

Personal information
- Born: 2 November 2003 (age 22) Bethlehem, Palestine

Sport
- Sport: Swimming

Dania Nour (Arabic: دانيا نور; born 2 November 2003 in Bethlehem) is a Palestinian swimmer.

== Career ==
She represented Palestine at the 2018 Asian Games held in Jakarta, Indonesia. She competed in the women's 50 metre freestyle, women's 100 metre freestyle and women's 50 metre butterfly events and in each event she did not advance to compete in the final.

In 2019, she represented Palestine at the World Aquatics Championships held in Gwangju, South Korea. She competed in the women's 50 metre freestyle and women's 50 metre butterfly events. In both events she did not advance to compete in the semi-finals.

She qualified to represent Palestine at the 2020 Summer Olympics in Tokyo, Japan.
