= Liu Xiang (swimmer) =

Chinese swimmer

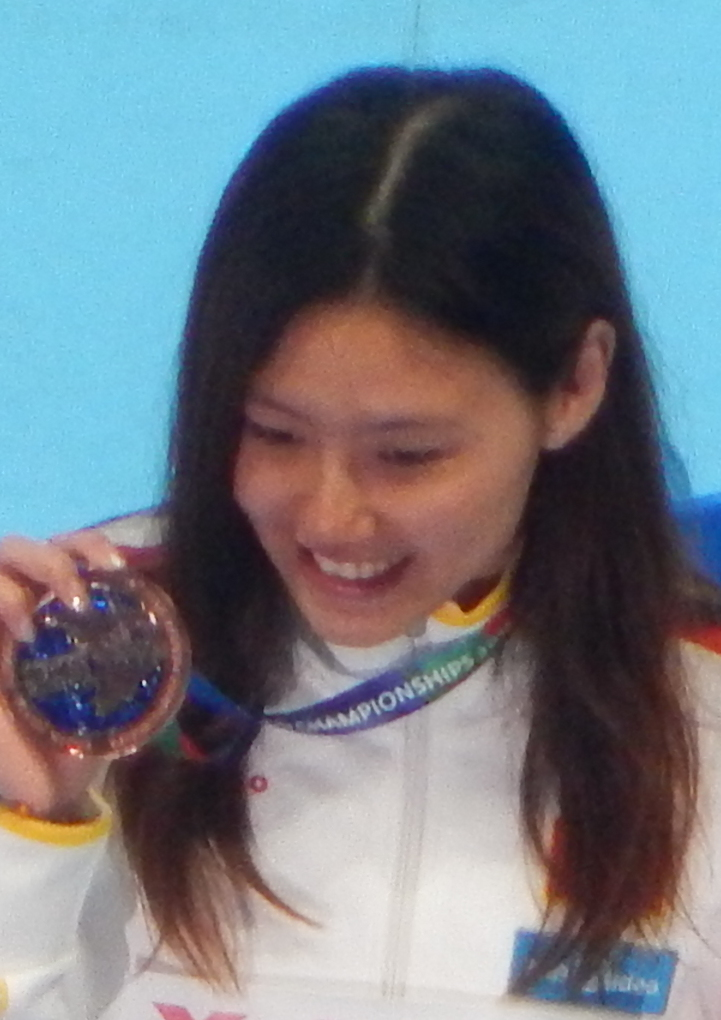
- Liu in Kazan 2015

Personal information
- Full name: 刘湘 (2003－) 刘嘉欣 (1996－2003, birthname)
- National team: China
- Born: September 1, 1996 (age 29) Guangzhou, Guangdong
- Height: 1.80 m (5 ft 11 in)

Sport
- Sport: Swimming
- Strokes: Backstroke, Freestyle
- College team: South China Normal University
Medal record
Women's swimming
Representing China
World Championships (LC)
Bronze medal – third place	2015 Kazan	50 m backstroke
Asian Games
Gold medal – first place	2018 Jakarta-Palembang	50 m backstroke
Silver medal – second place	2018 Jakarta-Palembang	50 m freestyle

Liu Xiang (Chinese: 刘湘; pinyin: Liú Xiāng, born 1 September 1996) is a Chinese retired competitive swimmer.

== Early life ==
Born Liu Jiaxin in Tianhe District, Guangzhou, she is the only daughter to her parents. Both of her parents were basketball players, but she chose swimming.

Liu is an alumnus of South China Normal University.

== Swimming ==
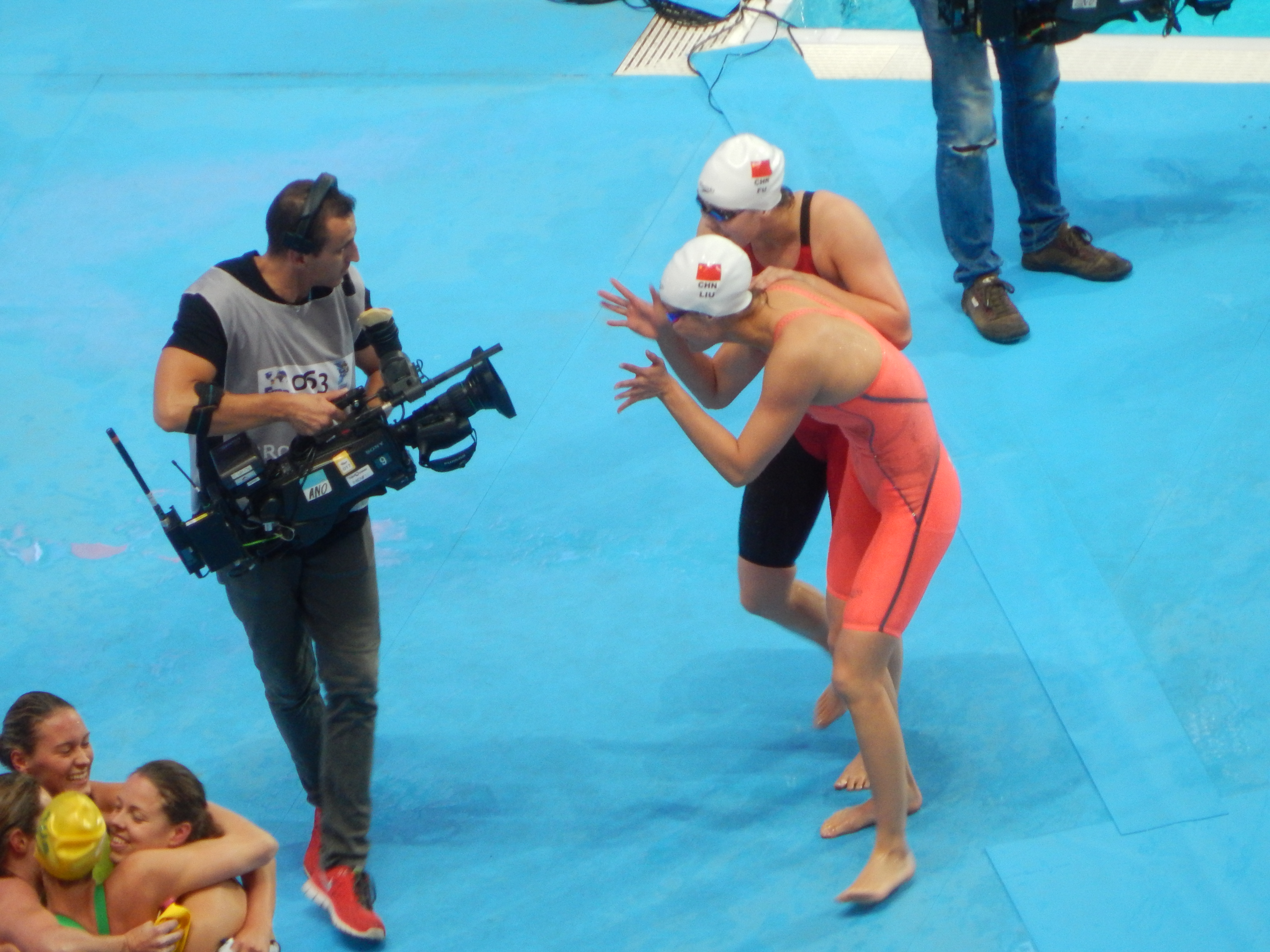
Liu Xiang (in pink) and teammate Fu Yuanhui celebrating at the 2015 World Aquatics Championships in Kazan.

At the 2015 World Aquatics Championships, Liu won the bronze medal in the 50-meter backstroke behind teammate Fu Yuanhui at the 2015 World Aquatics Championships in Kazan, Russia. She also competed at the 2016 Summer Olympics.

In the 2018 Asian Games Liu broke the 27-second barrier in the women's 50m backstroke as she set a world record and took the gold medal.

== Personal bests ==
As of July 30, 2021

=== Long course (50-meter pool) ===
Event	Time	Meet	Date	Note(s)
50m freestyle	23.97	2021 Chinese National Games	26 September 2021	NR AS
100m freestyle	55.27	2018 Spring National Championships	19 January 2018	
50m backstroke	26.98	2018 Asian Games	21 August 2018	NR AS WR
100m backstroke	1:00.46	2016 Chinese National Championships	3 April 2016	
50m butterfly	26.25	2019 World Cup	9 August 2019	
100m butterfly	1:00.05	2020 Chinese National Championships	30 September 2020	

=== Short course (25-meter pool) ===
Event	Time	Meet	Date	Note(s)
50m freestyle	24.35	2017 World Cup	10 November 2017	
50m backstroke	26.49	2018 World Cup	2 November 2018	
100m backstroke	1:01.02	2014 World Cup	25 October 2014	
50m butterfly	27.75	2016 World Cup	1 October 2016	

Key: NR = National Record, AS = Asian Record, WR = World Record

Records
Preceded by (China) Zhao Jing	World record holder Women's 50 m backstroke (long course); 21 August 2018 – 20 October 2023	Succeeded by (Australia) Kaylee McKeown
