= Swimming at the 2018 Asian Games – Men's 50 metre freestyle =

Men's 50 metre freestyle at the 2018 Asian Games
- Venue: Gelora Bung Karno Aquatic Stadium
- Date: 21 August 2018
- Competitors: 51 from 33 nations

Medalists
gold medal	Yu Hexin	China
silver medal	Katsumi Nakamura	Japan
bronze medal	Shunichi Nakao	Japan

The men's 50 metre freestyle event at the 2018 Asian Games took place on 21 August at the Gelora Bung Karno Aquatic Stadium.

== Schedule ==
All times are Western Indonesia Time (UTC+07:00)

Date	Time	Event
Tuesday, 21 August 2018	09:06	Heats
Tuesday, 21 August 2018	18:06	Final

== Records ==
Prior to this competition, the existing world, Asian and Games records were as follows.

World Record	César Cielo (BRA)	20.91	São Paulo, Brazil	18 December 2009
Asian Record	Katsumi Nakamura (JPN)	21.87	Yamaguchi, Japan	11 February 2018
Games Record	Ning Zetao (CHN)	21.94	Incheon, South Korea	23 September 2014

== Results ==
=== Heats ===
Rank	Heat	Athlete	Time	Notes
1	6	Yu Hexin (CHN)	22.21	
2	7	Kenneth To (HKG)	22.38	
3	5	Virdhawal Khade (IND)	22.43	
4	7	Katsumi Nakamura (JPN)	22.50	
5	6	Teong Tzen Wei (SGP)	22.56	
6	6	Lin Chien-liang (TPE)	22.60	
7	5	Shunichi Nakao (JPN)	22.62	
8	7	Adilbek Mussin (KAZ)	22.63	
9	5	Alexandr Varakin (KAZ)	22.72	
10	6	Yang Jae-hoon (KOR)	22.77	
11	7	Zhao Xianjian (CHN)	22.86	
12	3	Seo Min-suk (KOR)	22.88	
12	6	Matthew Abeysinghe (SRI)	22.88	
14	5	Triady Fauzi Sidiq (INA)	22.95	
14	7	Wu Chun-feng (TPE)	22.95	
16	7	Khurshidjon Tursunov (UZB)	23.02	
17	5	Joseph Schooling (SGP)	23.05	
18	6	Aleksey Tarasenko (UZB)	23.08	
19	7	Benyamin Gharehhassanloo (IRI)	23.11	
20	7	Kyle Abeysinghe (SRI)	23.36	
21	5	Keith Lim (MAS)	23.37	
22	4	Andrew Newling (THA)	23.48	
23	6	Sina Gholampour (IRI)	23.54	
24	5	Raymond Sumitra Lukman (INA)	23.66	
25	4	Ngou Pok Man (MAC)	23.67	
26	4	Anthony Barbar (LBN)	23.79	
27	4	Mokhtar Al-Yamani (YEM)	23.80	
28	1	Anshul Kothari (IND)	23.83	
28	5	Mohammed Bedour (JOR)	23.83	
30	4	Jeremy Wong (HKG)	23.85	
31	1	Waleed Abdulrazzaq (KUW)	23.89	
32	4	Foong Wei Tze (MAS)	24.17	
33	1	Yousif Bu Arish (KSA)	24.39	
34	4	Ngô Đình Chuyền (VIE)	24.49	
35	6	Lao Kuan Fong (MAC)	24.50	
36	4	Mohammad Mahfizur Rahman (BAN)	24.54	
37	3	Noah Al-Khulaifi (QAT)	24.64	
38	3	Issa Al-Adawi (OMA)	24.68	
39	3	Yacob Al-Khulaifi (QAT)	24.89	
40	3	Günsennorovyn Zandanbal (MGL)	25.12	
41	3	Olimjon Ishanov (TJK)	25.43	
42	2	Muhammad Yahya Khan (PAK)	25.50	
43	3	Thoeun Thol (CAM)	25.80	
44	3	Boldbaataryn Buyantogtokh (MGL)	25.86	
45	2	Loiy Juwaihan (PLE)	26.15	
46	2	Sirish Gurung (NEP)	26.33	
47	2	Santisouk Inthavong (LAO)	26.62	
48	2	Alijon Khairulloev (TJK)	27.16	
49	2	Ali Imaan (MDV)	27.60	
50	2	Hassan Ashraf (MDV)	28.68	
51	1	Ali Asghar Nazari (AFG)	29.34	

=== Final ===
Rank	Athlete	Time	Notes
1st place, gold medalist(s)	Yu Hexin (CHN)	22.11	
2nd place, silver medalist(s)	Katsumi Nakamura (JPN)	22.20	
3rd place, bronze medalist(s)	Shunichi Nakao (JPN)	22.46	
4	Virdhawal Khade (IND)	22.47	
5	Kenneth To (HKG)	22.54	
6	Teong Tzen Wei (SGP)	22.59	
7	Adilbek Mussin (KAZ)	22.64	
8	Lin Chien-liang (TPE)	22.67	
