= Yang Junxuan =

Chinese swimmer (born 2002)

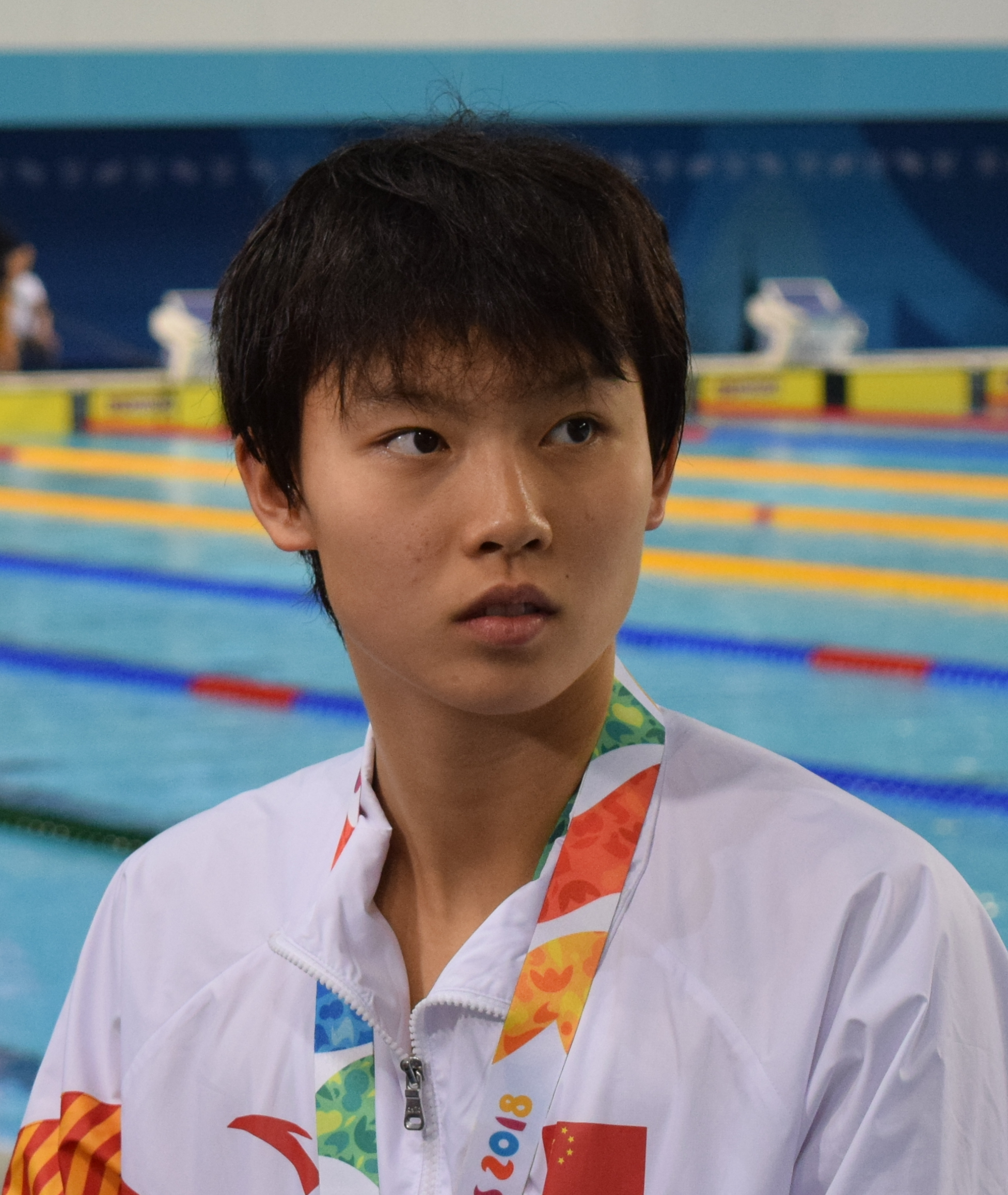
- Yang at the 2018 Summer Youth Olympics

Personal information
- Nationality: Chinese
- Born: 26 January 2002 (age 24) Zibo, Shandong, China
- Height: 1.78 m (5 ft 10 in)
- Weight: 68 kg (150 lb)

Sport
- Sport: Swimming
- Strokes: Freestyle
Medal record
Event	1st	2nd	3rd
Olympic Games	1	2	3
World Championships (LC)	1	0	1
World Championships (SC)	1	1	1
Asian Games	4	3	1
Summer Youth Olympics	2	2	2
Total	9	8	8
Women's swimming
Representing China
Olympic Games
Gold medal – first place	2020 Tokyo	4×200 m freestyle
Silver medal – second place	2020 Tokyo	4×100 m mixed medley
Silver medal – second place	2024 Paris	4×100 m mixed medley
Bronze medal – third place	2024 Paris	4×100 m freestyle
Bronze medal – third place	2024 Paris	4×200 m freestyle
Bronze medal – third place	2024 Paris	4x100 m medley
World Championships (LC)
Gold medal – first place	2022 Budapest	200 m freestyle
Bronze medal – third place	2023 Fukuoka	4×100 m freestyle
World Championships (SC)
Gold medal – first place	2018 Hangzhou	4×200 m freestyle
Silver medal – second place	2018 Hangzhou	4×100 m medley
Bronze medal – third place	2018 Hangzhou	4×100 m freestyle
Military World Games
Gold medal – first place	2019 Wuhan	100 m freestyle
Gold medal – first place	2019 Wuhan	200 m freestyle
Gold medal – first place	2019 Wuhan	4×100 m freestyle
Gold medal – first place	2019 Wuhan	4×200 m freestyle
Gold medal – first place	2019 Wuhan	4×100 m medley
Gold medal – first place	2019 Wuhan	4X100 m mixed freestyle
Gold medal – first place	2019 Wuhan	4x100 m mixed medley
Asian Games
Gold medal – first place	2018 Jakarta-Palembang	4×200 m freestyle
Gold medal – first place	2018 Jakarta-Palembang	4×100 m mixed medley
Gold medal – first place	2022 Hangzhou	4×100 m freestyle
Gold medal – first place	2022 Hangzhou	4×100 m mixed medley
Silver medal – second place	2018 Jakarta-Palembang	200 m freestyle
Silver medal – second place	2018 Jakarta-Palembang	4×100 m freestyle
Silver medal – second place	2022 Hangzhou	100 m freestyle
Bronze medal – third place	2018 Jakarta-Palembang	100 m freestyle
Summer Youth Olympics
Gold medal – first place	2018 Buenos Aires	4×100 m medley
Gold medal – first place	2018 Buenos Aires	4×100 m mixed medley
Silver medal – second place	2018 Buenos Aires	100 m freestyle
Silver medal – second place	2018 Buenos Aires	200 m freestyle
Bronze medal – third place	2018 Buenos Aires	50 m freestyle
Bronze medal – third place	2018 Buenos Aires	4×100 m mixed freestyle

Yang Junxuan (Chinese: 杨浚瑄; pinyin: Yáng Jùnxuān, born 26 January 2002) is a Chinese swimmer specializing in freestyle events. At the 2020 Summer Olympics, she won gold in the 4x200 metre freestyle relay.

== Career ==
Yang competed at the 2018 Asian Games in the following competitions: 100 metre freestyle winning bronze in 54.17, 200 metre freestyle winning silver in 1:57.48, women's 4 × 100 metre freestyle relay winning the silver medal and 4 x 200 m freestyle relay winning gold.

At the 2018 Summer Youth Olympics in Buenos Aires, Yang won bronze in the 50 metre freestyle event in 25.47, silver in the 100 metre freestyle event in 54.43 and silver in the 200 metre freestyle event in 1:58.05, as well as gold in the 4 x 100 metre relay event (her time of 53.99 being the best of all participants) and gold in the mixed 4 x 100 metre medley relay event.

Yang Junxuan won gold in all seven swimming events she competed in at the 2019 Wuhan Military World Games.

At the 2020 Tokyo Olympics, held in 2021, Yang contributed to China's gold medal in the 4x200 metre freestyle relay, with her team setting a world record. She also won silver in the 4x100 metre mixed medley.

At the 2024 Paris Olympics, Yang and her team won bronze in the 4x100m freestyle relays and set a new Asian record with a time of 3:30.30, surpassing their previous record from the 2023 World Championships. Yang, who was in the starting leg, set a new Chinese national record in the 100-metre freestyle with a time of 52.48. Yang's 51.96 final freestyle anchor-leg swim in the Mixed 4x100m Medley Relay race helped her team beat the previous world record time of 3:37.58 set by Great Britain at the Tokyo Olympics with a time of 3:37.55, however she and her team had to settle for the Silver medal as the U.S. swim team captured the Gold medal with a faster new world record time of 3:37.43.

== See also ==
- List of Youth Olympic Games gold medalists who won Olympic gold medals
