= Anandia Evato =

Indonesian swimmer (born 1997)

Personal information
- Full name: Anandia Treciel Vanessae Evato
- Nationality: Indonesia
- Born: 3 September 1997 (age 28) Pekanbaru, Indonesia

Sport
- Sport: Swimming
- Strokes: Breaststroke
Medal record
Representing Indonesia
SEA Games
Bronze medal – third place	2017 Kuala Lumpur	100m breaststroke
Bronze medal – third place	2017 Kuala Lumpur	4x100m medley relay

Anandia Evato (born 3 September 1997) is an Indonesian swimmer. She competed in the women's 50 metre breaststroke event at the 2017 World Aquatics Championships.
