= Jamie Yeung =

Hong Kong swimmer (born 1997)

Jamie Yeung 楊珍美
Personal information
- Full name: Jamie Yeung Zhen-mei
- National team: Hong Kong
- Born: 8 July 1997 (age 28) Hong Kong

Sport
- Sport: Swimming
Medal record
Representing Hong Kong
Asian Games
Silver medal – second place	2018 Jakarta	4x100m medley relay
Bronze medal – third place	2014 Incheon	4x100m medley relay
Bronze medal – third place	2018 Jakarta	4x200m freestyle relay

Jamie Yeung Zhen-mei (Chinese: 楊珍美; pinyin: Yáng Zhēnměi; born 8 July 1997) is a Hong Kong competitive swimmer.

She competed in the women's 50 metre breaststroke at the 2019 World Aquatics Championships held in Gwangju, South Korea. In 2020, She competed in the women's 4×100 metre medley relay during the Tokyo 2020 Summer Olympics.
