= Chen Jie (swimmer) =

Chinese swimmer (born 1995)

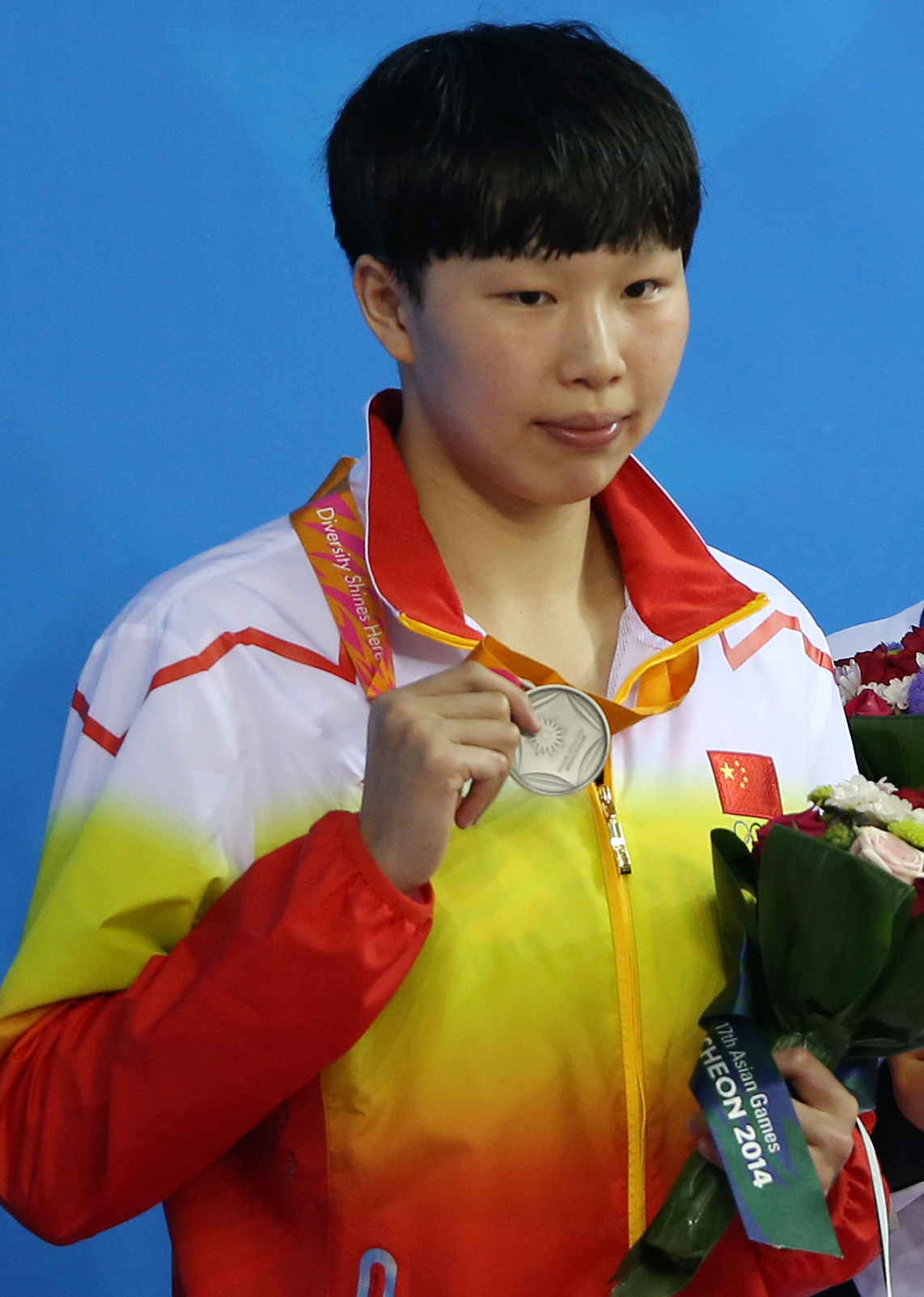

Personal information
- Born: 28 February 1995 (age 31) Wuhan, Hubei, China
- Height: 1.77 m (5 ft 10 in)

Sport
- Sport: Swimming
Medal record
Representing China
Asian Games
Bronze medal – third place	2018 Jakarta	100 m backstroke

Chen Jie (Note: In this Chinese name, the family name is Chen.) (Chinese: 陈洁, born 28 February 1995) is a Chinese swimmer.

Jie placed 27th in the women's 200 metre backstroke event at the 2016 Summer Olympics. At the 2020 Summer Olympics, she placed 22nd in the 100 m backstroke, and fourth in the 4 × 100 medley relay as part of the Chinese team.
