= Chantal Liew =

Singaporean swimmer (born 1998)

Chantal Liew 刘俐杉
Personal information
- Full name: Chantal Liew Li-Shan
- Nationality: Singapore
- Born: 9 August 1998 (age 27) Singapore
Chantal Liew
- Simplified Chinese: 刘俐杉
Transcriptions
Standard Mandarin
- Hanyu Pinyin: Liú Lìshān
- Wade–Giles: Liu^{2} Li^{4} shan^{1}

Sport
- Sport: Swimming
- Event: Open water swimming
Medal record
Representing Singapore
SEA Games
Silver medal – second place	2017 Kuala Lumpur	10 km open water
Silver medal – second place	2025 Thailand	10 km open water

Chantal Liew Li-Shan (born 9 August 1998) is a Singaporean national open water swimmer.

== Early life ==
Liew graduated with a degree in Communications and New Media from the National University of Singapore.

== Sports career ==
Liew dreamed of participating in the SEA Games since she was a child. She started to participate in swimming competitions at the age of 10 and entered the Singapore national team at the age of 16.

In 2017, she won a SEA Games silver in a personal best of 2:21:30 in the women's 10 km open water swim held in Kuala Lumpur and became the first Singapore woman to win a medal in the event, after Thai swimmer Benjaporn Sriphanomthorn was stripped for her silver medal following a failed doping test.

Liew became the first Singaporean open water swimming athlete to participate at the Olympic Games after finishing 29th in the 10 km race at FINA Olympic Marathon Swim Qualifier in Setubal, thereby qualifying for a place at the 2020 Tokyo Olympic Games. During the Olympics, she ranked 23rd among 25 contestants in the final with a time of 2:08:17.90.

Following the end of 2020 Olympics, Liew announced her retirement from professional swimming career.
