= Anna Konishi =

Japanese swimmer (born 1996)

Personal information
- Nationality: Japan
- Born: 10 May 1996 (age 30) Toyooka, Hyōgo
- Height: 159 cm (5 ft 3 in)
- Weight: 52 kg (115 lb)

Sport
- Sport: Swimming
- Strokes: Backstroke
Medal record
Representing Japan
Summer Universiade
Gold medal – first place	2017 Taipei	4×100 m medley

Anna Konishi (Kanji:小西 杏奈, Konsihi Anna, born 10 May 1996) is a Japanese backstroke swimmer. She qualified to represent Japan at the 2020 Summer Olympics in Tokyo 2021. She placed 13th in women's 100 metre backstroke, 8th in mixed 4 × 100 metre medley relay, and 8th in women's 4 × 100 metre medley relay with the Japanese teams.
