= Toto Wong =

Hong Kong swimmer (born 1999)

Personal information
- Full name: Toto Wong Kwan-to
- Born: 15 November 1999 (age 26)

Sport
- Sport: Swimming
Medal record
Representing Hong Kong
Asian Games
Silver medal – second place	2018 Jakarta	4×100 m medley

Toto Wong Kwan-to (born 15 November 1999) is a Hong Kong swimmer. She competed in the women's 50 metre backstroke event at the 2017 World Aquatics Championships.
