= Aishath Sajina =

Maldivian swimmer

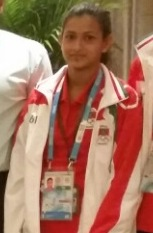
- Sajina in 2014

Personal information
- Nationality: Maldivian
- Born: 2 January 1997 (age 28)

Sport
- Sport: Swimming

Aishath Sajina (born 2 January 1997) is a Maldivian swimmer. She competed in the women's 100 metre breaststroke at the 2020 Summer Olympics.
