= Bayaryn Yesüi =

Mongolian swimmer (born 2000)

Bayar Yesui
Personal information
- Full name: Bayar Yesui
- Nationality: Mongolian
- Born: 21 July 2000 (age 26) Mongolia
- Height: 5 ft 11 in (1.80 m)
- Weight: 130 lb (60 kg)

Sport
- Sport: Swimming
- Strokes: Freestyle, backstroke

Bayar Yesui (Mongolian: Баярын Есүй; born 21 July 2000) is a Mongolian swimmer. She competed in the women's 50 metre freestyle at the 2016 Summer Olympics and finished 60th with a time of 28.40 seconds out of 91 contestants. She did not advance to the semifinals, which required a top 16 finish in the heats. Bayar Yesui is the youngest Olympian from Mongolia.
