= Fu Yuanhui =

Chinese swimmer (born 1996)

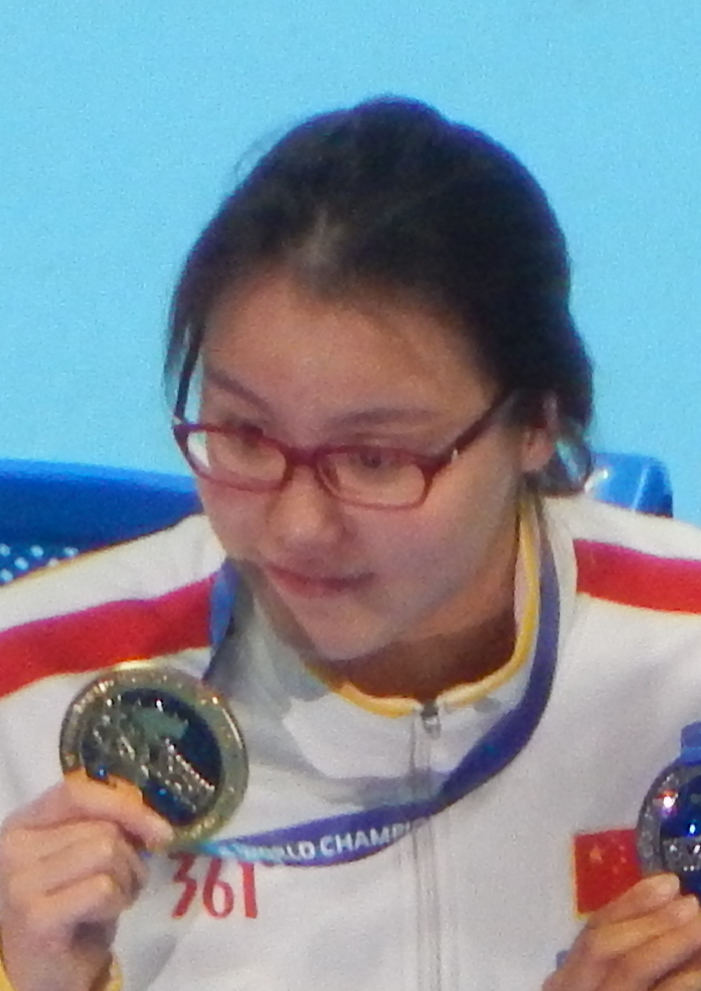
- Fu Yuanhui in 2015 Kazan

Personal information
- Full name: 傅园慧
- Nickname: Honghuang Girl (洪荒少女)
- National team: China
- Born: January 7, 1996 (age 30) Hangzhou, Zhejiang, China
- Height: 1.77 m (5 ft 10 in)
- Weight: 67 kg (148 lb)

Sport
- Sport: Swimming
- Strokes: Backstroke
- Club: Zhejiang Swimming Team
Medal record
Women's swimming
Representing China
Event	1st	2nd	3rd
Summer Olympics	0	0	1
World Championships (LC)	2	2	0
World Championships (SC)	0	2	0
Asian Games	2	1	0
Total	4	5	1
Olympic Games
Bronze medal – third place	2016 Rio de Janeiro	100 m backstroke
World Championships (LC)
Gold medal – first place	2015 Kazan	50 m backstroke
Gold medal – first place	2015 Kazan	4×100 m medley
Silver medal – second place	2013 Barcelona	50 m backstroke
Silver medal – second place	2017 Budapest	50 m backstroke
World Championships (SC)
Silver medal – second place	2018 Hangzhou	4×50 m medley
Silver medal – second place	2018 Hangzhou	4×100 m medley
Asian Games
Gold medal – first place	2014 Incheon	50 m backstroke
Gold medal – first place	2014 Incheon	100 m backstroke
Silver medal – second place	2018 Jakarta	50 m backstroke

Fu Yuanhui (Chinese: 傅园慧; pinyin: Fù Yuánhuì; born January 7, 1996) is a Chinese competitive swimmer who specializes in backstroke. She won a bronze medal at the 2016 Rio Olympics in the 100-meter backstroke.

== Early life ==
On January 7, 1996, Fu was born in Hangzhou, Zhejiang, China. She is the only daughter to her parents Fu Chunsheng (傅春昇) and Shen Ying (沈英).

Fu started swimming at the age of 5.

== Swimming career ==
=== 2012 Summer Olympics ===
At the 2012 Summer Olympics in London, she competed in the Women's 100 metre backstroke, finishing in 8th place in the final.

=== 2013 World Championships ===
At the 2013 World Aquatics Championship in Barcelona, Fu placed second in the 50 metre backstroke, losing to her teammate Zhao Jing with a time of 27.39s.

=== 2014 Asian Games ===
At the 2014 Asian Games in Incheon, Fu won two gold medals in the 50 m and 100 m backstroke.

=== 2015 World Championships ===
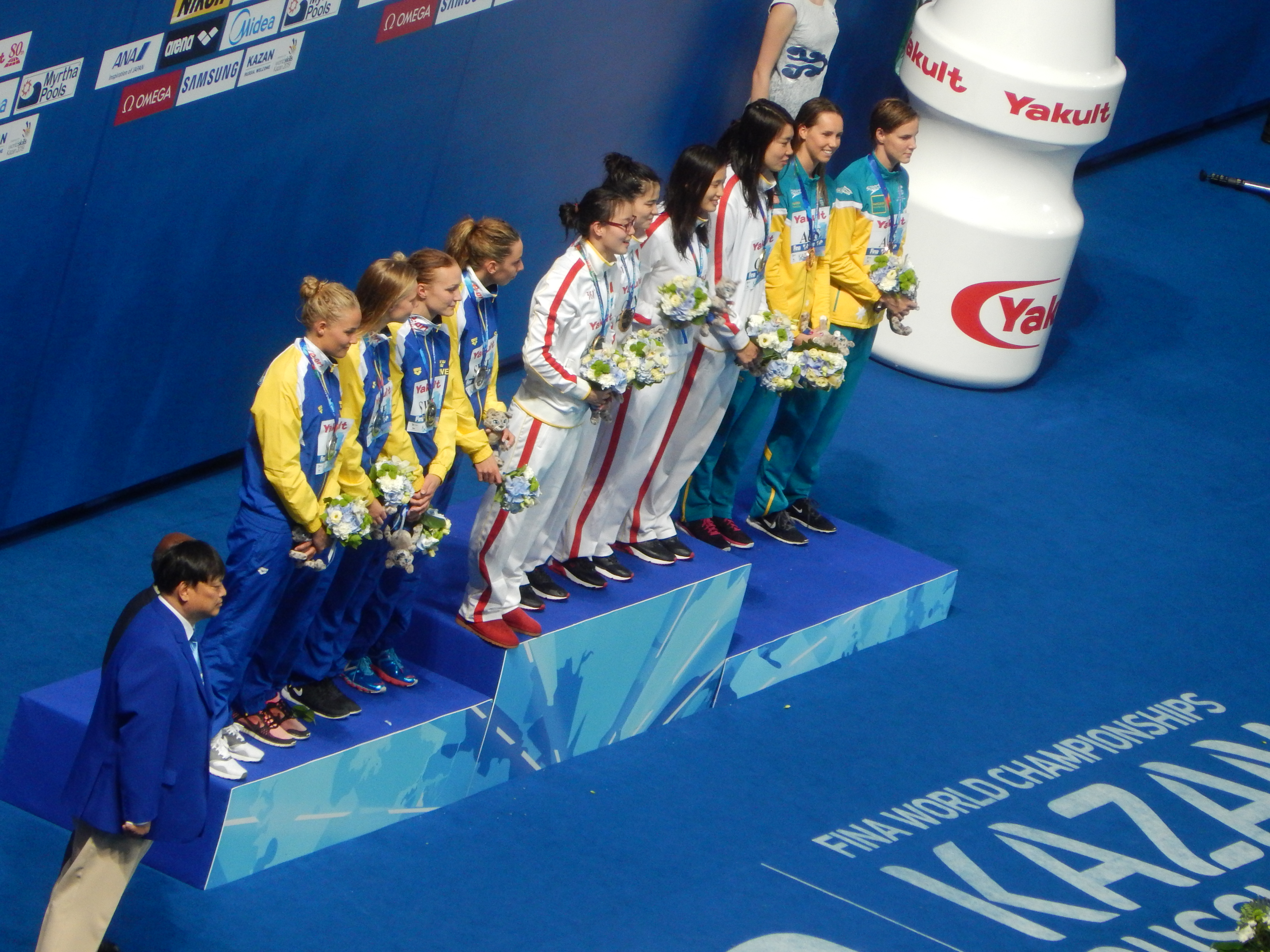
Fu Yuanhui, left on top step, victory ceremony 4 × 100 m medley relay (2015)

She won the 50 metre backstroke at the World Aquatics Championship in 2015 and helped China win the 4x100 metre medley. In the interview, Fu complained her swimsuit was too tight.

=== 2016 Summer Olympics ===
At the 2016 Summer Olympics in Rio, Fu gained popularity and became a swimming icon nationwide.

Fu won a bronze medal in the 100-meter backstroke by tying for third place with Canadian swimmer Kylie Masse. She finished in a national record time of 58.76. Throughout the Olympics, her cheerful interviews and goofy demeanor made her very popular. Mark Dreyer, a Beijing-based sports writer, noted that Fu exemplified "a positive trend in Chinese sports whereby athletics was undergoing a transition away from "manufactured Olympic champions" from the state-run sports system who were effective at bringing home medals but had cardboard personalities and inspired little devotion among fans'. Her series of facial expressions spread widely in the Internet, and her sayings such as "I've already spent my supernatural energy!" (我已使出了洪荒之力！) became very popular catchwords.

A few days later, after her lackluster performance in the 4×100-meter medley relay where the team placed fourth, she told an interviewer that she was on her period; many commended her decision to speak about this, menstruation being considered a taboo topic in sports.

=== 2016 Asian Swimming Championships ===
At the 2016 Asian Swimming Championships in Tokyo, Fu won gold medals for the first time. She won two gold medals in the 50 m and 100 m backstroke and a silver medal in the 4 × 100 m medley relay. Fu was very happy to show her medals on her Weibo.

== Personal life ==
Since 2016, Fu has been one of the most popular athletes in China. She takes part in some TV talk shows and charity activities. Fu also makes friends with many other swimmers such as Sun Yang and Ye Shiwen. She was a guest of the 2017 CCTV New Year's Gala.

== Personal bests (long course) ==
As of July 20, 2017

Event	Time	Meet	Date	Note(s)
50 m backstroke	27.11	2015 World Aquatics Championships	August 6, 2015	
100 m backstroke	58.72	2017 Chinese National Championships	April 12, 2017	NR
200 m backstroke	2.08.84	2015 BHP Super Series	January 30, 2015	
