= Gelora Bung Karno Aquatic Stadium =

Sports stadium in Central Jakarta, Indonesia

- Stadion Akuatik Gelora Bung Karno
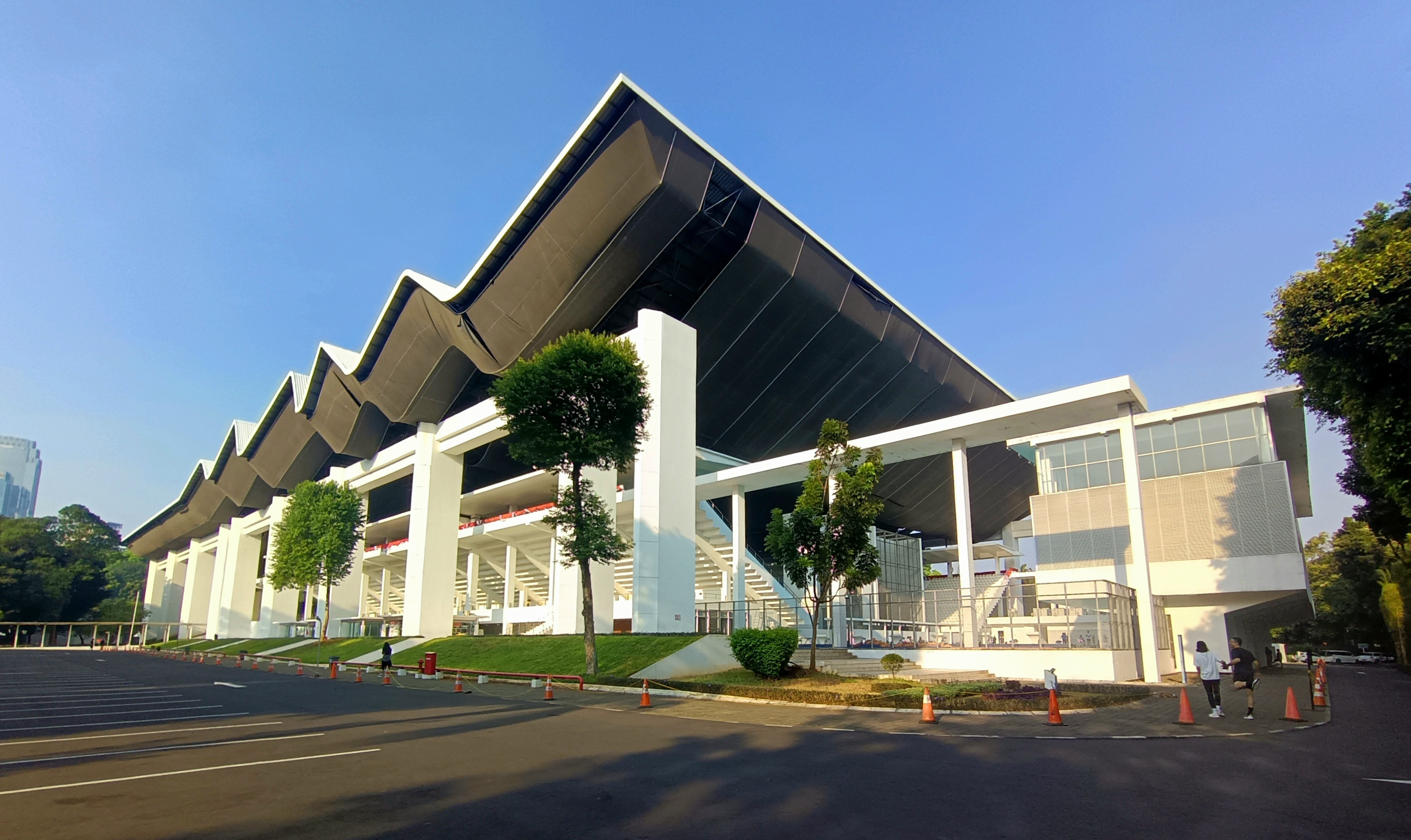
- Outside view, 2024
- Interactive map of Gelora Bung Karno Aquatic Stadium
- Former names: Senayan Swimming Stadium
- Location: Gelora, Central Jakarta, Jakarta, Indonesia
- Owner: Government of Indonesia (via Ministry of State Secretariat)
- Operator: Pusat Pengelolaan Komplek Gelora Bung Karno (PPKGBK, Gelora Bung Karno Complex Management Center)
- Capacity: 7,800 Capacity history: 8,000 (1962–2018) 7,800 (2018–present)
- Public transit: Istora Mandiri; Palmerah; Senayan Bank Jakarta; Gerbang Pemuda

Construction
- Built: 1962
- Renovated: 1988; 2016–2018
- Closed: 2016–2018

The Gelora Bung Karno Aquatic Stadium (Indonesian: Stadion Akuatik Gelora Bung Karno) is an aquatics stadium in the Gelora Bung Karno Sports Complex in Gelora, Central Jakarta, Indonesia. It has a capacity of 7,800. It is used mostly for swimming and water polo events. The stadium was used during the 2018 Asian Games and Asian Para Games.

== Gallery ==
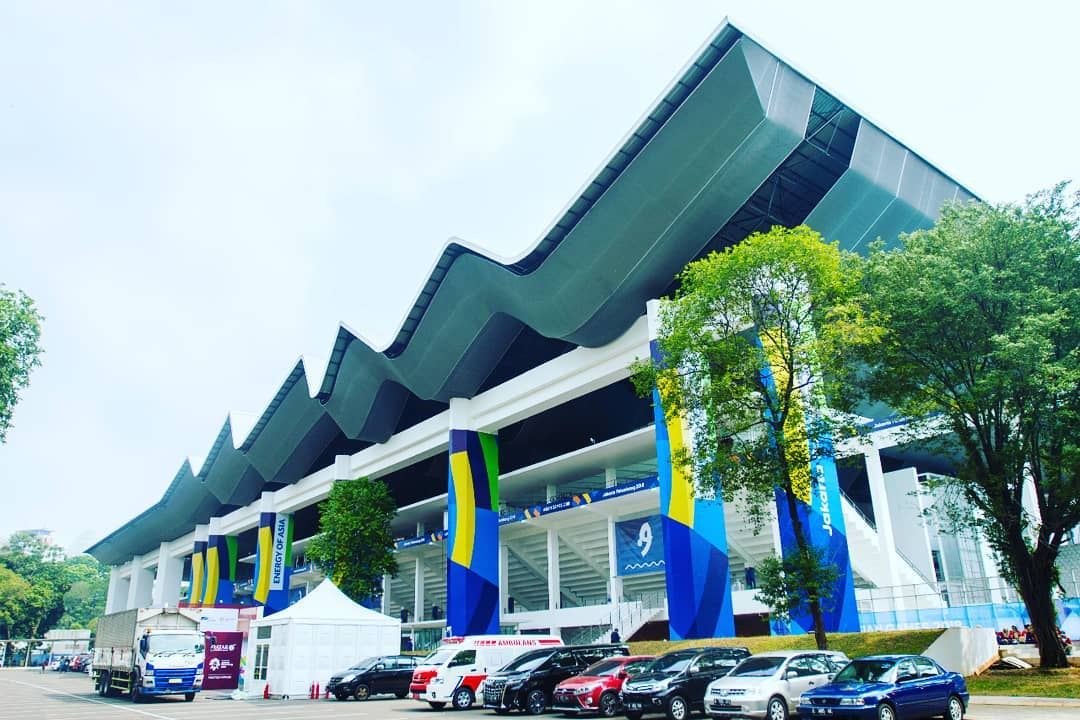

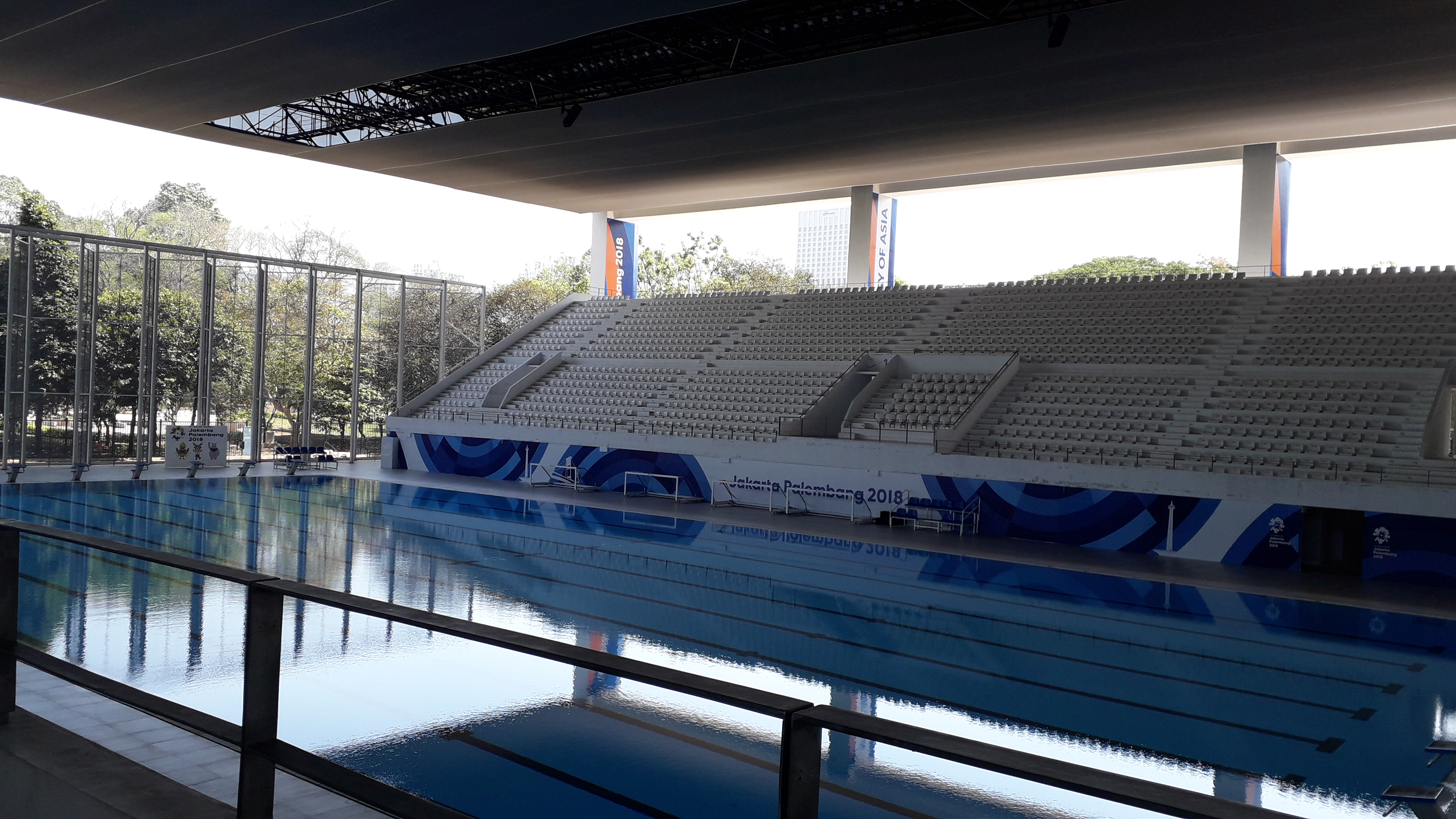

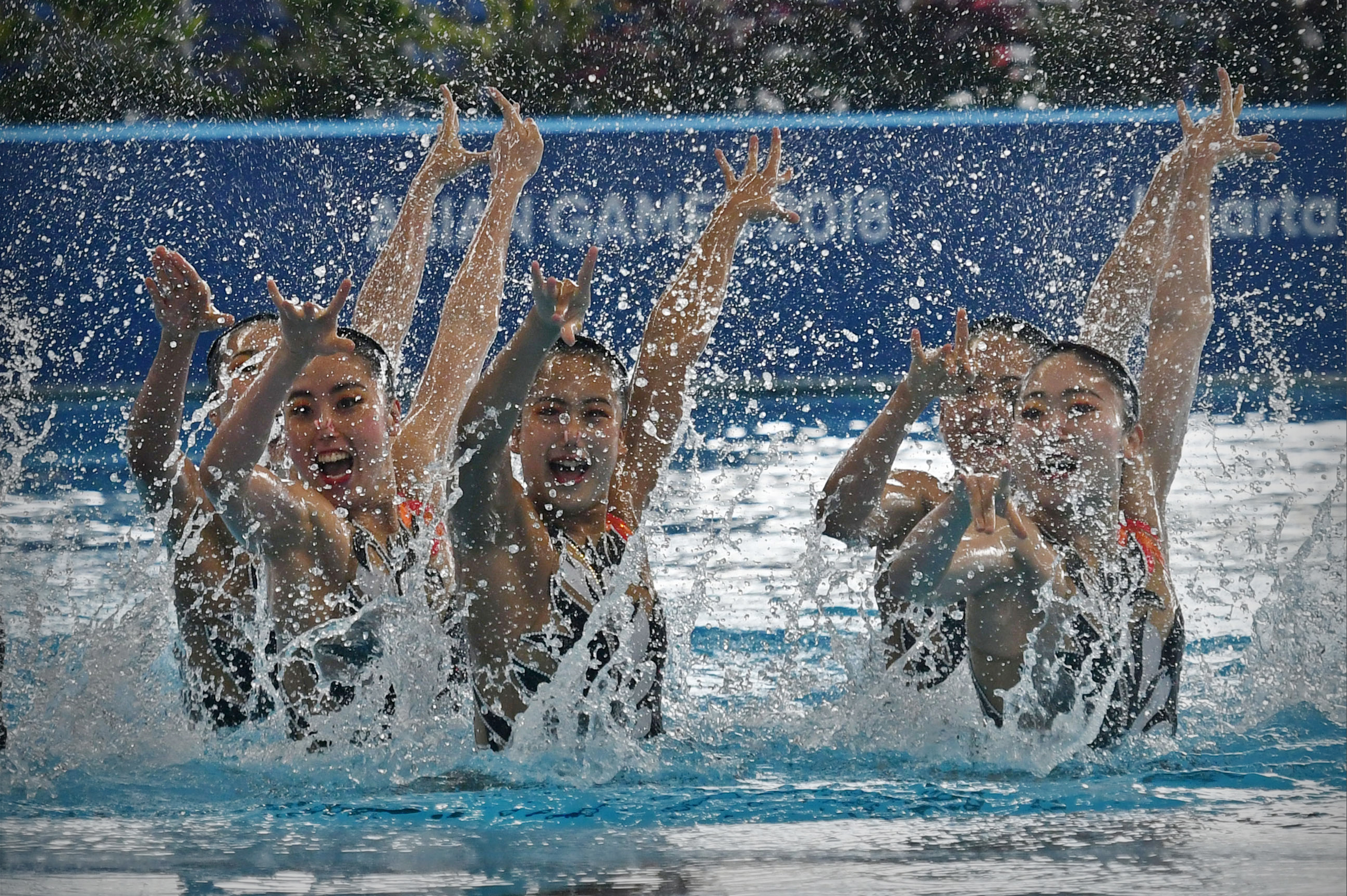
