= Kazakhstan at the 2018 Asian Games =

- Flag of Kazakhstan
- IOC code: KAZ
- NOC: National Olympic Committee of the Republic of Kazakhstan
- Website: www.olympic.kz (in Kazakh)

in Jakarta and Palembang August 18 – September 2
- Competitors: 440 in 32+1 sports
- Flag bearers: Opening: Abilkhan Amankul; Closing:
- Medals Ranked 9th: Gold 15 Silver 17 Bronze 44 Total 76

Asian Games appearances (overview)
- 1994; 1998; 2002; 2006; 2010; 2014; 2018; 2022; 2026

Kazakhstan participated in the 2018 Asian Games in Jakarta and Palembang, Indonesia, from 18 August to 2 September 2018.

== Medalists ==
The following Kazakhstan competitors won medals at the Games.

Medal	Name	Sport	Event	Date
Gold	Dmitriy Alexanin	Fencing	Men's individual épée	19 Aug
Gold	Alexey Lutsenko	Cycling	Men's road race	23 Aug
Gold	Alexey Lutsenko	Cycling	Men's road time trial	24 Aug
Gold	Darkhan Nortayev	Ju-jitsu	Men's 62 kg	25 Aug
Gold	Ruslan Israilov	Ju-jitsu	Men's 77 kg	26 Aug
Gold	Guzaliya Gafurova	Karate	Women's kumite 68 kg	27 Aug
Gold	Dayana Abdirbekova; Alina Adilkhanova; Adilya Tlekenova	Gymnastics	Women's rhythmic team all-around	27 Aug
Gold	Alina Adilkhanova	Gymnastics	Women's rhythmic individual all-around	28 Aug
Gold	Ilya Golendov; Alexey Dergunov; Sergii Tokarnytskyi; Yevgeniy Alexeyev	Canoeing	Men's K-4 500 metres	30 Aug
Gold	Didar Khamza	Judo	Men's 81 kg	30 Aug
Gold	Olga Rypakova	Athletics	Women's triple jump	30 Aug
Gold	Baglan Ibragim	Sambo	Men's 52 kg	31 Aug
Gold	Inna Klinova	Canoeing	Women's K-1 200 metres	1 Sep
Gold	Dildash Kuryshbayeva	Sambo	Women's 68 kg	1 Sep
Gold	Kazakhstan men's national water polo team: Pavel Lipilin; Yevgeniy Medvedev; Ruslan Akhmetov; Roman Pilipenko; Miras Aubakirov; Alexey Shmider; Murat Shakenov; Altay Altayev; Rustam Ukumanov; Mikhail Ruday; Ravil Manafov; Yulian Verdesh; Valeriy Shlemov	Water polo	Men's tournament	1 Sep
Silver	Daniyar Kaisanov	Wrestling	Men's freestyle 74 kg	19 Aug
Silver	Zhuldyz Eshimova	Wrestling	Women's freestyle 53 kg	20 Aug
Silver	Kazakhstan women's national water polo team: Alexandra Zharkimbayeva; Oxana Saichuk; Aizhan Akilbayeva; Anna Turova; Anastassiya Yeremina; Darya Roga; Anna Novikova; Sivilya Raiter; Shakhzoda Mansurova; Zamira Myrzabekova; Anastassiya Mirshina; Anastassiya Murataliyeva; Azhar Alibayeva	Water polo	Women's tournament	21 Aug
Silver	Cansel Deniz	Taekwondo	Women's +67 kg	21 Aug
Silver	Almat Kebispayev	Wrestling	Men's Greco-Roman 67 kg	21 Aug
Silver	Nurmakhan Tinaliyev	Wrestling	Men's Greco-Roman 130 kg	22 Aug
Silver	Alexander Bublik; Denis Yevseyev	Tennis	Men's doubles	24 Aug
Silver	Didar Amirali	Karate	Men's kumite 67 kg	26 Aug
Silver	Margarita Mukasheva	Athletics	Women's 800 metres	28 Aug
Silver	Ilya Golendov; Andrey Yerguchyov	Canoeing	Men's K-2 1000 metres	30 Aug
Silver	Sergey Yemelyanov; Timofey Yemelyanov	Canoeing	Men's C-2 1000 metres	30 Aug
Silver	Ayan Beisenbayev	Triathlon	Men's individual	1 Sep
Silver	Sergii Tokarnytskyi	Canoeing	Men's K-1 200 metres	1 Sep
Silver	Inna Klinova; Irina Podoinikova; Zoya Ananchenko; Viktoriya Kopyova	Canoeing	Women's K-4 500 metres	1 Sep
Silver	Aslanbek Shymbergenov	Boxing	Men's 69 kg	1 Sep
Silver	Abilkhan Amankul	Boxing	Men's 75 kg	1 Sep
Silver	Zhansay Smagulov; Yeldos Zhumakanov; Islam Bozbayev; Didar Khamza; Yerassyl Kazhybayev; Sanzhar Zhabborov; Kamshat Karassaikyzy; Sevara Nishanbayeva; Zere Bektaskyzy; Iolanta Berdybekova; Gulzhan Issanova; Zarina Raifova	Judo	Mixed team	1 Sep
Bronze	Fariza Aldangorova	Taekwondo	Women's 53 kg	19 Aug
Bronze	Sayatbek Okassov	Wrestling	Men's freestyle 65 kg	19 Aug
Bronze	Adilet Davlumbayev	Wrestling	Men's freestyle 86 kg	19 Aug
Bronze	Kirill Kazantsev	Cycling	Men's cross-country	21 Aug
Bronze	Ruslan Zhaparov	Taekwondo	Men's +80 kg	21 Aug
Bronze	Elmira Syzdykova	Wrestling	Women's freestyle 76 kg	21 Aug
Bronze	Meirambek Ainagulov	Wrestling	Men's Greco-Roman 60 kg	21 Aug
Bronze	Aibike Khabibullina; Tamara Pochekutova; Tatyana Prikhodko; Aigerim Sarybay	Fencing	Women's team sabre	22 Aug
Bronze	Alexandr Kulikov	Canoeing	Men's slalom C-1	22 Aug
Bronze	Dmitriy Alexanin; Elmir Alimzhanov; Ruslan Kurbanov; Vadim Sharlaimov	Fencing	Men's team épée	22 Aug
Bronze	Nurlan Myrzabayev	Taekwondo	Men's 80 kg	22 Aug
Bronze	Dmitriy Balandin	Swimming	Men's 100 metre breaststroke	22 Aug
Bronze	Azamat Kustubayev	Wrestling	Men's Greco-Roman 87 kg	22 Aug
Bronze	Yerulan Iskakov	Wrestling	Men's Greco-Roman 97 kg	22 Aug
Bronze	Aleksandra Opachanova	Rowing	Women's single sculls	23 Aug
Bronze	Mariya Dmitriyenko	Shooting	Women's double trap	23 Aug
Bronze	Yerassyl Kaiyrbek	Taekwondo	Men's 68 kg	23 Aug
Bronze	Adilbek Mussin	Swimming	Men's 50 metre butterfly	23 Aug
Bronze	Gozal Ainitdinova; Anna Danilina	Tennis	Women's doubles	24 Aug
Bronze	Aleksandr Nedovyesov; Anna Danilina	Tennis	Mixed doubles	24 Aug
Bronze	Nurzhan Seiduali	Ju-jitsu	Men's 56 kg	24 Aug
Bronze	Nartay Kazhekov	Ju-jitsu	Men's 69 kg	24 Aug
Bronze	Dmitriy Balandin	Swimming	Men's 50 metre breaststroke	24 Aug
Bronze	Adil Kaskabay; Dmitriy Balandin; Adilbek Mussin; Alexandr Varakin	Swimming	Men's 4 × 100 metre medley relay	24 Aug
Bronze	Rizat Makhashev	Ju-jitsu	Men's 94 kg	25 Aug
Bronze	Daniyar Yuldashev	Karate	Men's kumite +84 kg	25 Aug
Bronze	Ivan Ivanov	Athletics	Men's shot put	25 Aug
Bronze	Elina Mikhina	Athletics	Women's 400 metres	26 Aug
Bronze	Yekaterina Nemich; Alexandra Nemich	Artistic swimming	Women's duet	28 Aug
Bronze	Svetlana Golendova; Dmitriy Koblov; Elina Mikhina; Mikhail Litvin	Athletics	Mixed 4 × 400 metres relay	28 Aug
Bronze	Galbadrakhyn Otgontsetseg	Judo	Women's 48 kg	29 Aug
Bronze	Yeldos Zhumakanov	Judo	Men's 66 kg	29 Aug
Bronze	Artyom Zakharov	Cycling	Men's individual pursuit	29 Aug
Bronze	Nadezhda Dubovitskaya	Athletics	Women's high jump	29 Aug
Bronze	Pirmammad Aliyev	Gymnastics	Men's trampoline	30 Aug
Bronze	Yersultan Muzapparov	Kurash	Men's 90 kg	30 Aug
Bronze	Artyom Zakharov	Cycling	Men's omnium	30 Aug
Bronze	Viktoriya Zyabkina; Elina Mikhina; Svetlana Golendova; Olga Safronova; Rima Kashafutdinova	Athletics	Women's 4 × 100 metres relay	30 Aug
Bronze	Gulzhan Issanova	Judo	Women's +78 kg	31 Aug
Bronze	Aizhan Zhylkybayeva	Sambo	Women's 48 kg	31 Aug
Bronze	Beimbet Kanzhanov	Sambo	Men's 52 kg	31 Aug
Bronze	Merey Medetov; Timur Khaidarov	Canoeing	Men's C-2 200 metres	1 Sep
Bronze	Alibek Zekenov	Sambo	Men's 90 kg	1 Sep
Bronze	Kazakhstan women's national rugby sevens team: Veronika Stepanyuga; Nigora Nurmatova; Karina Proskurina; Yeva Bekker; Vlada Odnoletok; Olessya Teryayeva; Kundyzay Baktybayeva; Anna Yakovleva; Svetlana Klyuchnikova; Balzhan Koishybayeva; Darya Tkachyova; Lyudmila Korotkikh	Rugby sevens	Women's tournament	1 Sep

Medals by sport
Sport	1st place, gold medalist(s)	2nd place, silver medalist(s)	3rd place, bronze medalist(s)	Total
Artistic swimming	0	0	1	1
Athletics	1	1	5	7
Boxing	0	2	0	2
Canoeing	2	4	2	8
Cycling	2	0	3	5
Fencing	1	0	2	3
Gymnastics	2	0	1	3
Ju-jitsu	2	0	3	5
Judo	1	1	3	5
Karate	1	1	1	3
Kurash	0	0	1	1
Rowing	0	0	1	1
Rugby sevens	0	0	1	1
Sambo	2	0	3	5
Shooting	0	0	1	1
Swimming	0	0	4	4
Taekwondo	0	1	4	5
Tennis	0	1	2	3
Triathlon	0	1	0	1
Water polo	1	1	0	2
Wrestling	0	4	6	10
Total	15	17	44	76

Medals by day
Day	Date	1st place, gold medalist(s)	2nd place, silver medalist(s)	3rd place, bronze medalist(s)	Total
1	August 19	1	1	3	5
2	August 20	0	1	0	1
3	August 21	0	3	4	7
4	August 22	0	1	7	8
5	August 23	1	0	4	5
6	August 24	1	1	6	8
7	August 25	1	0	3	4
8	August 26	1	1	1	3
9	August 27	2	0	0	2
10	August 28	1	1	2	4
11	August 29	0	0	4	4
12	August 30	3	2	4	9
13	August 31	1	0	3	4
14	September 1	3	6	3	12
15	September 2	0	0	0	0
Total		15	17	44	76

== Competitors ==
The following is a list of the number of competitors representing Kazakhstan that participated at the Games:

Sport	Men	Women	Total
Archery	8	8	16
Artistic swimming	—	9	9
Athletics	15	18	33
Basketball	16	16	32
Bowling	2	3	5
Boxing	7	3	10
Canoeing	11	7	18
Cycling	17	2	19
Fencing	9	8	17
Field hockey	16	17	33
Golf	4	2	6
Gymnastics	6	6	12
Handball	0	16	16
Ju-jitsu	12	3	15
Judo	8	7	15
Karate	4	4	8
Kurash	6	6	12
Modern pentathlon	2	2	4
Rowing	8	5	13
Rugby sevens	0	12	12
Sailing	3	1	4
Sambo	4	4	8
Shooting	12	9	21
Sport climbing	7	6	13
Swimming	6	1	7
Taekwondo	9	5	14
Tennis	4	4	8
Triathlon	2	1	3
Volleyball	18	17	35
Water polo	13	13	26
Wrestling	12	5	17
Wushu	6	2	8
Total	247	222	469

Demonstration events

Sport	Men	Women	Total
eSports	8	0	8

== Archery ==
Recurve

Athlete	Event	Ranking round		Round of 64	Round of 32	Round of 16	Quarterfinals	Semifinals	Final / BM	
Athlete	Event	Score	Seed	Opposition Score	Opposition Score	Opposition Score	Opposition Score	Opposition Score	Opposition Score	Rank
Ilfat Abdullin	Men's individual	673	4	Bye	Alotaibi (KSA); W 6–0	Viswash (IND); W 7–1	Mohamad (MAS); W 7–3	Lee (KOR); L 1–7	Agatha (INA); L 2–6	4
Sultan Duzelbayev	Men's individual	651	24	Did not advance						
Denis Gankin	Men's individual	669	6	Bye	Edwar (INA); W 7–3	Das (IND); L 3–7	Did not advance			
Sanzhar Mussayev	Men's individual	660	12	Did not advance						
Ilfat Abdullin; Denis Gankin; Sanzhar Mussayev	Men's team	2002	2	—N/a	Bye	North Korea; W 5–3	Mongolia; L 3–5	Did not advance		
Karakoz Askarova	Women's individual	581	58	Did not advance						
Alina Ilyassova	Women's individual	640	23	Did not advance						
Luiza Saidiyeva	Women's individual	641	18	Bye	Nguyen (VIE); L 2–6	Did not advance				
Farida Tukebayeva	Women's individual	653	10	Bye	Nemati (IRI); L 5–6	Did not advance				
Alina Ilyassova; Luiza Saidiyeva; Farida Tukebayeva	Women's team	1934	6	—N/a		Malaysia; W 6–2	China; L 2–6	Did not advance		
Ilfat Abdullin; Farida Tukebayeva	Mixed team	1326	5	—N/a	Bye	Bangladesh; L 4–5	Did not advance			

Compound

Athlete	Event	Ranking round		Round of 32	Round of 16	Quarterfinals	Semifinals	Final / BM	
Athlete	Event	Score	Seed	Opposition Score	Opposition Score	Opposition Score	Opposition Score	Opposition Score	Rank
Pavel Fisher; Akbarali Karabayev; Sergey Khristich; Konstantin Solodovnikov	Men's team	2069	6	—N/a	Thailand; W 227–222	Chinese Taipei; L 227–232	Did not advance		
Viktoriya Lyan; Diana Makarchuk; Adel Zhexenbinova; Nina Dudareva	Women's team	2049	5	—N/a	Singapore; W 225–212	Iran; L 217–224	Did not advance		
Akbarali Karabayev; Adel Zhexenbinova	Mixed team	1384	6	Bye	Vietnam; W 155–151	Chinese Taipei; L 149–151	Did not advance		

== Artistic swimming ==
Athlete	Event	Technical routine		Free routine		Total	Rank
Athlete	Event	Points	Rank	Points	Rank	Total	Rank
Yekaterina Nemich; Alexandra Nemich	Duet	84.7178	3	86.1667	3	170.8845	3rd place, bronze medalist(s)
Yana Degtyareva; Yelena Krylova; Alina Matkova; Jennifer Russanova; Yekaterina Simonova; Kristina Tynybayeva; Olga Yezdakova; Alexandra Nemich^{FR} Yekaterina Nemich^{TR}	Team	80.5444	4	82.5000	4	163.0444	4

FR: Reserved in free routine; TR: Reserved in technical routine.

== Basketball ==
Summary

Team	Event	Group Stage						Quarterfinal	Semifinals / Pl.	Final / BM / Pl.	
Team	Event	Opposition Score	Opposition Score	Opposition Score	Opposition Score	Opposition Score	Rank	Opposition Score	Opposition Score	Opposition Score	Rank
Kazakhstan men's	Men's tournament	—N/a			Philippines; L 59−96	China; L 66−83	3	Did not advance			13
Kazakhstan women's	Women's tournament	—N/a	Chinese Taipei; L 42−72	India; W 79−61	Indonesia; W 85−37	Korea; L 57−85	3 Q	Japan; L 57−104	Indonesia; W 93−65	Thailand; W 71−64	5
Kazakhstan men's	Men's 3x3 tournament	Afghanistan; W 21−12	Turkmenistan; L 13−17	Iran; L 15−21	Malaysia; W 21−14	Iraq; W 21−18	2 Q	South Korea; L 13−17	Did not advance		
Kazakhstan women's	Women's 3x3 tournament	—N/a	—N/a	Maldives; W DSQ	Iran; L 12−18	Thailand; L 6−21	3	Did not advance			

=== 5x5 basketball ===
Kazakhstan men's and women's basketball team entered the competition and drawn in the group D for the men's and in the group X for the women's.

==== Men's tournament ====
Roster

The following is the Kazakhstan roster in the men's basketball tournament of the 2018 Asian Games.

Kazakhstan men's national basketball team - 2018 Asian Games roster
Players
Coaches

Pos.	No.	Name	Age – Date of birth	Height	Club	Ctr.
PG	2	Azim Yagodkin	26 – 21 February 1992	1.85 m (6 ft 1 in)	Caspiy Aktau	(Kazakhstan)
PG	6	Shaim Kuanov	27 – 28 July 1991	1.82 m (6 ft 0 in)	Caspiy Aktau	(Kazakhstan)
G/F	7	Nikolay Bazhin	27 – 9 December 1990	1.98 m (6 ft 6 in)	Barsy Atyrau	(Kazakhstan)
F	9	Vadim Chsherbak	25 – 24 May 1993	1.97 m (6 ft 6 in)	Astana	(Kazakhstan)
G/F	10	Rustam Murzagaliyev	26 – 24 May 1992	1.94 m (6 ft 4 in)	Astana	(Kazakhstan)
F	12	Aimurat Satkeyev	21 – 9 January 1997	1.98 m (6 ft 6 in)	Caspiy Aktau	(Kazakhstan)
G/F	13	Rustam Yergali	31 – 20 December 1986	1.94 m (6 ft 4 in)	Astana	(Kazakhstan)
C	14	Askar Maidekin	21 – 28 May 1997	2.05 m (6 ft 9 in)	Barsy Atyrau	(Kazakhstan)
F	17	Alexandr Zhigulin	24 – 26 April 1994	2.05 m (6 ft 9 in)	Astana	(Kazakhstan)
F	20	Anton Bykov	29 – 18 April 1989	2.00 m (6 ft 7 in)	Tobol Kostanay	(Kazakhstan)
F	24	Dmitriy Gavrilov	31 – 27 November 1986	2.03 m (6 ft 8 in)	Astana	(Kazakhstan)
G/F	25	Maxim Marchuk	24 – 17 January 1994	1.97 m (6 ft 6 in)	Astana	(Kazakhstan)

Head coach

- (Russia) Mikhail Karpenko

Assistant coach(es)

- (Lithuania) Renatas Kurilionokas

Legend

- (C) Team captain
- (NP) Naturalized player
- Club - describes last
  club before the tournament
- Age - describes age
  on 14 August 2018

Group D

Pos	Team	Pld	W	L	PF	PA	PD	Pts	Qualification
1	China	2	2	0	165	146	+19	4	Quarterfinals
2	Philippines	2	1	1	176	141	+35	3	Quarterfinals
3	Kazakhstan	2	0	2	125	179	−54	2	

Source: OCA

16 August
10:00

Kazakhstan	59–96	Philippines
Scoring by quarter: 9–16, 11–25, 23–20, 16–35
Pts: Bykov 13; Rebs: Gavrilov 8 Asts: Murzagaliyev 6		Pts: Pringle 18; Rebs: Almazan 8 Asts: Tiu 5

Gelora Bung Karno Basketball Hall, Jakarta
Referees: Yuen Chun Yip (HKG), Mohammad Doust (IRI), Jun Horiuchi (JPN)

23 August
16:00

Kazakhstan	66–83	China
Scoring by quarter: 18–26, 19–12, 12–31, 17–14
Pts: Yergali 15; Rebs: Bazhin, Bykov, Marchuk 6 Asts: Yergali 7		Pts: Liu 18; Rebs: Abdusalam 11; Asts: Liu 6

Gelora Bung Karno Basketball Hall, Jakarta
Referees: Mohammad Doust (IRI), Imran Ali Baig (IND), Anan Daraghma (PLE)

==== Women's tournament ====
Roster

The following is the Kazakhstan roster in the women's basketball tournament of the 2018 Asian Games.

Kazakhstan women's national basketball team - 2018 Asian Games roster
Players
Coaches
}

Pos.	No.	Name	Age – Date of birth	Height	Club	Ctr.
PG	2	Elmira Abikeyeva	21 – 11 April 1997	1.70 m (5 ft 7 in)	Iritish Pavladar	(Kazakhstan)
PF	3	Zalina Kurazova	33 – 28 January 1985	1.84 m (6 ft 0 in)	Astana Tigers	(Kazakhstan)
SG	5	Rufina Gavrilyuk	32 – 25 February 1986	1.74 m (5 ft 9 in)	Iritish Pavladar	(Kazakhstan)
G	6	Oxana Bagmet	21 – 9 October 1996	1.70 m (5 ft 7 in)	Astana Tigers	(Kazakhstan)
G/F	7	Tamara Yagodkina	28 – 10 January 1990	1.82 m (6 ft 0 in)	Astana Tigers	(Kazakhstan)
G/F	8	Mariya Astapenko	29 – 28 May 1989	1.78 m (5 ft 10 in)	Astana Tigers	(Kazakhstan)
G	10	Olga Kolesnikova	26 – 2 February 1992	1.70 m (5 ft 7 in)	Okzhetpes Kokshetau	(Kazakhstan)
C	11	Oxana Ivanova (C)	28 – 19 April 1990	1.87 m (6 ft 2 in)	Astana Tigers	(Kazakhstan)
C	13	Anna Vinokurova	25 – 18 December 1992	1.90 m (6 ft 3 in)	Astana Tigers Youth	(Kazakhstan)
C	15	Nadezhda Kondrakova	29 – 4 August 1989	1.92 m (6 ft 4 in)	Astana Tigers	(Kazakhstan)
SF	16	Alexandra Kovalevskaya	21 – 8 April 1997	1.74 m (5 ft 9 in)	Iritish Pavladar	(Kazakhstan)
PF	19	Oxana Ossipenko	33 – 4 January 1985	1.86 m (6 ft 1 in)	Iritish Pavladar	(Kazakhstan)

Head coach

- (Russia) Evgenii Ovsiannikov

Assistant coach(es)

- (Kazakhstan) Azamat Kabdylkarimov

Legend

- (C) Team captain
- (NP) Naturalized player
- Club - describes last
  club before the tournament
- Age - describes age
  on 15 August 2018

Group X

Pos	Team	Pld	W	L	PF	PA	PD	Pts	Qualification
1	Chinese Taipei	4	4	0	358	239	+119	8	Quarterfinals
2	Korea	4	3	1	382	238	+144	7	Quarterfinals
3	Kazakhstan	4	2	2	263	291	−28	6	Quarterfinals
4	Indonesia	4	1	3	233	374	−141	5	Quarterfinals
5	India	4	0	4	242	336	−94	4	

Source: OCA

15 August
12:30

Kazakhstan	42–72	Chinese Taipei
Scoring by quarter: 6–16, 12–20, 11–19, 13–17
Pts: Kondrakova 11; Rebs: Kondrakova 12; Asts: Yagodkina 4		Pts: Peng 16; Rebs: Huang F. 8 Asts: Huang F. 9

Gelora Bung Karno Basketball Hall, Jakarta
Referees: Ferdinand Pascual (PHI), Watcharin Padungratchadakit (THA), Cui Zhexiong (CHN)

17 August
16:00

India	61–79	Kazakhstan
Scoring by quarter: 13–18, 12–19, 21–22, 15–20
Pts: Jeena 15; Rebs: Anjana 10; Asts: Anjana 10		Pts: Yagodkina 21; Rebs: Kondrakova 11; Asts: Yagodkina, Kolesnikova 6

Gelora Bung Karno Basketball Hall, Jakarta
Referees: Yuen Chun Yip (HKG), Cui Zhexiong (CHN), Jun Horiuchi (JPN)

19 August
18:30

Indonesia	73–85	Kazakhstan
Scoring by quarter: 14–18, 17–25, 13–23, 29–19
Pts: Christaline 30; Rebs: Christaline 7 Asts: Tjundawan, Sutjiono 3		Pts: Kondrakova 18; Rebs: Kondrakova 9 Asts: Kurazova 7

Gelora Bung Karno Basketball Hall, Jakarta
Referees: Ferdinand Pascual (PHI), Cui Zhexiong (CHN), Jun Horiuchi (JPN)

21 August
10:00

Kazakhstan	57–85	Korea
Scoring by quarter: 12–29, 17–18, 12–22, 16–16
Pts: Kolesnikova, Kondrakova 10; Rebs: Kondrakova 8 Asts: Astapenko 4		Pts: Ro 19; Rebs: Park J.H., Ro 7 Asts: Park H.J. 10

Gelora Bung Karno Basketball Hall, Jakarta
Referees: Ferdinand Pascual (PHI), Kumiko Kumagai (JPN), Cui Zhexiong (CHN)

Quarter-final

26 August
16:00

Japan	104–57	Kazakhstan
Scoring by quarter: 22–21, 23–7, 28–18, 31–11
Pts: Nakada, Watanabe 19; Rebs: Umezawa 9 Asts: Miyazaki 9		Pts: Kondrakova 14; Rebs: Kolesnikova, Kondrakova 9 Asts: Kolesnikova 3

Gelora Bung Karno Basketball Hall, Jakarta
Referees: Mohammad Doust (IRI), Watcharin Padungratchadakit (THA), Chen Ying-cheng (TPE)

Classification 5th–8th

28 August
12:30

Kazakhstan	93–65	Indonesia
Scoring by quarter: 27–14, 27–19, 15–17, 24–15
Pts: Yagodkina 20; Rebs: Kurazova 10; Asts: Yagodkina 10		Pts: Christaline 17; Rebs: Tjundawan 6 Asts: Gabriel 4

Gelora Bung Karno Basketball Hall, Jakarta
Referees: Snehal Bendke (IND), Jun Horiuchi (JPN), Cui Zhexiong (CHN)

Fifth place game

31 August
16:00

Thailand	64–71	Kazakhstan
Scoring by quarter: 15–17, 13–14, 23–18, 13–22
Pts: Prajuapsook 19; Rebs: Maihom 6 Asts: Saechua 5		Pts: Kondrakova 17; Rebs: Ivanova 9 Asts: Kurazova 7

Istora Gelora Bung Karno, Jakarta
Referees: Snehal Bendke (IND), Kumiko Kumagai (JPN), Budi Marfan (INA)

=== 3x3 basketball ===
The country also set a men's and women's team that competed in 3-on-3 basketball.

==== Men's tournament ====
Roster

The following is the Kazakhstan roster in the men's 3x3 basketball tournament of the 2018 Asian Games.

- Anuar Shakirov (8)
- Vassiliy Belozor (9)
- Andrey Litvinenko (45)
- Ruslan Aitkali (47)

Pool D

Pos	Team	Pld	W	L	PF	PA	PD	Qualification
1	Iran	5	5	0	99	56	+43	Quarterfinals
2	Kazakhstan	5	3 (Note: Head-to-head result: KAZ 21–18 IRQ.)	2	91	82	+9	Quarterfinals
3	Iraq	5	3	2	90	82	+8	
4	Malaysia	5	2 (Note: Head-to-head result: MAS 17–13 TKM.)	3	82	80	+2	
5	Turkmenistan	5	2	3	73	76	−3	
6	Afghanistan	5	0	5	47	106	−59	

Source: OCA
Notes:

22 August
17:50

Kazakhstan	21–12	Afghanistan
Pts: Aitkali 12		Pts: Khairi 9

Gelora Bung Karno Tennis Center Court, Jakarta
Referees: Quinn (INA), Lim (MAS)

22 August
19:00

Kazakhstan	13–17	Turkmenistan
Pts: Litvinenko 8		Pts: Hojamedow 12

Gelora Bung Karno Tennis Center Court, Jakarta
Referees: Ito (JPN), Shi (CHN)

22 August
20:10

Kazakhstan	15–21	Iran
Pts: Aitkali 10		Pts: Khajehzadeh 8

Gelora Bung Karno Tennis Center Court, Jakarta
Referees: Ho (HKG), Shi (CHN)

25 August
15:20

Malaysia	14–21	Kazakhstan
Pts: Ting 10		Pts: Belozor 8

Gelora Bung Karno Tennis Center Court, Jakarta
Referees: Quinn (INA), Tan (SGP)

25 August
17:30

Iraq	18–21	Kazakhstan
Pts: Hasan 9		Pts: Aitkali 13

Gelora Bung Karno Tennis Center Court, Jakarta
Referees: Shi (CHN), Quinn (INA)

Quarter-final

26 August
16:10

South Korea	17–13	Kazakhstan
Pts: Kim 7		Pts: Aitkali 6

Gelora Bung Karno Tennis Center Court, Jakarta
Referees: Liu (MAS), Tan (SGP)

==== Women's tournament ====
Roster

The following is the Kazakhstan roster in the women's 3x3 basketball tournament of the 2018 Asian Games.

- Madina Baibolekova (1)
- Alexandra Petelina (13)
- Anastassiya Arzamastseva (14)
- Luiza Zukova (77)

Pool C

Pos	Team	Pld	W	L	PF	PA	PD	Qualification
1	Thailand	3	3	0	32	13	+19	Quarterfinals
2	Iran	3	2	1	25	23	+2	Quarterfinals
3	Kazakhstan	3	1	2	18	39	−21	
—	Maldives	3	0	3	0	0	0	

Source: OCA

21 August
19:20

Kazakhstan	vs.	Maldives
Forfeit

Gelora Bung Karno Tennis Center Court, Jakarta

24 August
15:20

Iran	18–12	Kazakhstan
Pts: Yazdian 7		Pts: Zukova 9

Gelora Bung Karno Tennis Center Court, Jakarta
Referees: Lim (MAS), Shi (CHN)

24 August
16:20

Kazakhstan	6–21	Thailand
Pts: Petelina, Arzamastseva, Zukova 2		Pts: Bunsinprom 7

Gelora Bung Karno Tennis Center Court, Jakarta
Referees: Shi (CHN), Lim (MAS)

== Bowling ==
Men

Athlete	Event	Block 1	Block 2	Total	Rank
Athlete	Event	Result	Result	Total	Rank
Ruslan Ekkel; Zhaksylyk Saudabayev	Trios	1162	1143	2305	32
Ruslan Ekkel; Zhaksylyk Saudabayev	Team of six	1230	1036	2266	17

Women

Athlete	Event	Block 1	Block 2	Total	Rank
Athlete	Event	Result	Result	Total	Rank
Natalya Mandritsa; Natalya Orlova; Yelena Grishinenko	Trios	1659	1752	3411	20
Natalya Mandritsa; Natalya Orlova; Yelena Grishinenko	Team of six	1691	1705	3396	12

== Boxing ==
Men

Athlete	Event	Round of 32	Round of 16	Quarterfinals	Semifinals	Final	Rank
Athlete	Event	Opposition Result	Opposition Result	Opposition Result	Opposition Result	Opposition Result	Rank
Temirtas Zhussupov	–49 kg	Bye	T Tsuboi (JPN); W 3–2	C Paalam (PHI); L 1–4	Did not advance		
Azat Mahmetov	–52 kg	S Al-Nuami (UAE); WO	Kim I-k (KOR); W 4–1	R Ladon (PHI); L 2–3	Did not advance		
Kairat Yeraliyev	–56 kg	Bye	C Butdee (THA); L 0–5	Did not advance			
Samatali Toltayev	–60 kg	Bye	Lai C-e (TPE); W 3–2	Shan J (CHN); L 0–5	Did not advance		
Bekdaulet Ibragimov	–64 kg	Bye	Wang G (CHN); W 5–0	W Masuk (THA); L 1–4	Did not advance		
Aslanbek Shymbergenov	–69 kg	S Lumbantobing (INA); W 5–0	G Zaib (PAK); W 5–0	A Abdurakhmanov (KGZ); W 5–0	Z Eashash (JOR); W 5–0	BU Baturov (UZB); L 1–3	2nd place, silver medalist(s)
Abilkhan Amankul	–75 kg	Bye	A Khankhokkhruea (THA); W 5–0	Kan C-w (TPE); W 5–0	VK Yadav (IND); WO	I Madrimov (UZB); L 2–3	2nd place, silver medalist(s)

Women

Athlete	Event	Round of 32	Round of 16	Quarterfinals	Semifinals	Final	Rank
Athlete	Event	Opposition Result	Opposition Result	Opposition Result	Opposition Result	Opposition Result	Rank
Nazym Kyzaibay	–51 kg	Bye	RB Aziz (PAK); W RSC	Lin Y-t (TPE); L 1–4	Did not advance		
Saniya Sultankyzy	–57 kg	—N/a	K Hansika (SRI); W 5–0	N Techasuep (THA); L 2–3	Did not advance		
Rimma Volossenko	–60 kg	—N/a	Bye	S Seesondee (THA); L 1–4	Did not advance		

== Canoeing ==
=== Slalom ===
Athlete	Event	Heats		Semifinal		Final	
Athlete	Event	Best	Rank	Time	Rank	Time	Rank
Alexandr Kulikov	Men's C-1	90.39	4 Q	94.15	5 Q	98.49	3rd place, bronze medalist(s)
Kuanysh Yerengaipov	Men's C-1	91.44	6 Q	98.12	6	Did not advance	
Kamilla Safina	Women's C-1	118.56	4 Q	128.65	6 Q	132.88	5
Kamilla Safina	Women's K-1	107.46	6 Q	166.45	10 Q	118.25	4

=== Sprint ===
Athlete	Event	Heats		Semifinal		Final	
Athlete	Event	Time	Rank	Time	Rank	Time	Rank
Merey Medetov; Timur Khaidarov	Men's C-2 200 m	38.762	2 QF	Bye		37.371	3rd place, bronze medalist(s)
Sergey Yemelyanov; Timofey Yemelyanov	Men's C-2 1000 m	—N/a				3:41.893	2nd place, silver medalist(s)
Sergii Tokarnytskyi	Men's K-1 200 m	36.219	1 QF	Bye		35.745	2nd place, silver medalist(s)
Ilya Golendov; Andrey Yerguchyov	Men's K-2 1000 m	3:27.907	1 QF	Bye		3:23.815	2nd place, silver medalist(s)
Ilya Golendov; Alexey Dergunov; Sergii Tokarnytskyi; Yevgeniy Alexeyev	Men's K-4 500 m	1:25.457	1 QF	Bye		1:24.203	1st place, gold medalist(s)
Svetlana Ussova	Women's C-1 200 m	52.918	3 QF	Bye		51.442	6
Inna Klinova	Women's K-1 200 m	42.942	1 QF	Bye		42.045	1st place, gold medalist(s)
Anastassiya Berezovskaya	Women's K-1 500 m	—N/a				2:04.836	6
Zoya Ananchenko; Irina Podoinikova	Women's K-2 500 m	—N/a				1:49.529	4
Inna Klinova; Irina Podoinikova; Zoya Ananchenko; Viktoriya Kopyova	Women's K-4 500 m	—N/a				1:35.452	2nd place, silver medalist(s)

Qualification legend: QF=Final; QS=Semifinal

== Cycling ==
=== Mountain biking ===
Athlete	Event	Final	
Athlete	Event	Time	Rank
Shakir Adilov	Men's cross-country	1:41:31	8
Kirill Kazantsev	Men's cross-country	1:37:30	3rd place, bronze medalist(s)

=== Road ===
Athlete	Event	Final	
Athlete	Event	Time	Rank
Zhandos Bizhigitov	Men's road race	3:36:12	42
Daniil Fominykh	Men's road race	3:36:12	43
Yevgeniy Gidich	Men's road race	3:35:19	40
Alexey Lutsenko	Men's road race	3:25:25	1st place, gold medalist(s)
Amiliya Iskakova	Women's road race	3:06:16	18
Natalya Saifutdinova	Women's road race	2:57:54	10
Alexey Lutsenko	Men's time trial	55:37.13	1st place, gold medalist(s)
Natalya Saifutdinova	Women's time trial	36:23.81	9

=== Track ===
Sprint

Athlete	Event	Qualification		Round of 32	Round of 16	Quarterfinals	Semifinals	Final	
Athlete	Event	Time	Rank	Opposition Time	Opposition Time	Opposition Time	Opposition Time	Opposition Time	Rank
Sergey Ponomaryov	Men's sprint	10.335	14	A Raditya (INA); W 11.077	Zhou Y (CHN); L	Did not advance			14
Pavel Vorzhev	Men's sprint	10.180	9	Bye	J Angsuthasawit (THA); W 10.638	Im C-b (KOR); L	Did not advance		8

Team sprint

Athlete	Event	Qualification		Final	
Athlete	Event	Time	Rank	Opposition Time	Rank
Maxim Nalyotov; Sergey Ponomaryov; Pavel Vorzhev; Bogdan Ruder^{b}	Men's team sprint	44.889	6	Did not advance	

^{b} Riders who entered the competition but did not participating in any phase of the team event.
Qualification legend: FA=Gold medal final; FB=Bronze medal final

Pursuit

Athlete	Event	Qualification		Round 1		Final	
Athlete	Event	Time	Rank	Opposition Time	Rank	Opposition Time	Rank
Artyom Zakharov	Men's pursuit	4:29.919	3 FB	—N/a		Ko SW (HKG); W	3rd place, bronze medalist(s)
Nikita Panassenko; Assylkhan Turar; Alisher Zhumakan; Sultanmurat Miraliyev; Robert Gaineyev; Roman Vassilenko^{b}	Men's team pursuit	4:10.384	3 Q	Hong Kong (HKG); L	4 FB	Japan (JPN); L	4

^{b} Riders who entered the competition but did not participating in any phase of the team event.
Qualification legend: FA=Gold medal final; FB=Bronze medal final

Keirin

Athlete	Event	1st Round	Repechage	2nd Round	Final
Athlete	Event	Rank	Rank	Rank	Rank
Sergey Ponomaryov	Men's keirin	6 R	3 Q	4 FB	12
Pavel Vorzhev	Men's keirin	5 R	1 Q	5 FB	11

Qualification legend: FA=Gold medal final; FB=Bronze medal final

Omnium

Athlete	Event	Scratch race		Tempo race		Elimination race		Points race		Total points	Rank
Athlete	Event	Rank	Points	Rank	Points	Rank	Points	Rank	Points	Total points	Rank
Artyom Zakharov	Men's omnium	6	30	4	34	3	36	5	12	112	3rd place, bronze medalist(s)

Madison

Athlete	Event	Points	Laps	Rank
Assylkhan Turar; Sultanmurat Miraliyev	Men's madison	13	−20	4

== Esports (demonstration) ==
StarCraft II

Athlete	ID	Event	Quarterfinals	Semifinals	Final / BM	
Athlete	ID	Event	Opposition Score	Opposition Score	Opposition Score	Rank
Satybaldin Adlet	Lightweight	StarCraft II	Vietnam; L 0–3	Did not advance		

League of Legends and Pro Evolution Soccer

Athlete	ID	Event	Group stage		Semifinals	Final / BM	
Athlete	ID	Event	Oppositions Scores	Rank	Opposition Score	Opposition Score	Rank
	BulaXOXO; Synns; Crayon; Fakelover; Milky	League of Legends	China: L 0–2; South Korea: L 0–2; Vietnam: L 0–2	4	Did not advance		
Utepov Rinat; Kanysh Abykenov	Rinat_Aktau kanysh86	Pro Evolution Soccer	Malaysia: L 0–2; Hong Kong: L 0–2; Iran: L 0–2	4	Did not advance		

== Fencing ==
Individual

Athlete	Event	Preliminary		Round of 32	Round of 16	Quarterfinals	Semifinals	Final	
Athlete	Event	Result	Rank	Opposition Score	Opposition Score	Opposition Score	Opposition Score	Opposition Score	Rank
Dmitriy Alexanin	Men's épée	4W 2L	2 Q	Juengamnuaychai (THA); W 15–9	Petrov (KGZ); W 15–10	Nguyễn (VIE); W 15–7	Jung (KOR); W 15–12	Park (KOR); W 15–12	1st place, gold medalist(s)
Ruslan Kurbanov	Men's épée	3W 2L	3 Q	Mohamed (MAS); W 15–9	Lan (CHN); W 15–13	Jung (KOR); L 14–15	Did not advance		7
Tamirlan Kaliyev	Men's foil	2W 3L	4 Q	Lim (SGP); L 10–15	Did not advance				21
Nurzhan Karim	Men's sabre	1W 3L	4 Q	Srinualnad (THA); W 15–13	Gu (KOR); L 4–15	Did not advance			16
Ilya Mokretsov	Men's sabre	2W 2L	3 Q	Bye	Low (HKG); L 8–15	Did not advance			13
Assel Alibekova	Women's épée	2W 3L	4 Q	Salameh (LBN); W 15–4	Sun (CHN); L 8–15	Did not advance			14
Ulyana Balaganskaya	Women's épée	2W 3L	4 Q	Khamitova (KGZ); W 15–9	Kong (HKG); L 5–15	Did not advance			15
Tamara Pochekutova	Women's sabre	2W 2L	3 Q	Bye	Chang (HKG); L 9–15	Did not advance			11
Aigerim Sarybay	Women's sabre	2W 2L	3 Q	Bye	Yoon (KOR); L 10–15	Did not advance			12

Team

Athlete	Event	Round of 16	Quarterfinals	Semifinals	Final	
Athlete	Event	Opposition Score	Opposition Score	Opposition Score	Opposition Score	Rank
Dmitriy Alexanin; Elmir Alimzhanov; Ruslan Kurbanov; Vadim Sharlaimov	Men's épée	Bye	Hong Kong (HKG); W 45–33	Japan (JPN); L 36–45	Did not advance	3rd place, bronze medalist(s)
Sergey Aniskov; Damir Ibragimov; Nurzhan Karim; Ilya Mokretsov	Men's sabre	Thailand (THA); W 45–38	South Korea (KOR); L 17–45	Did not advance		8
Assel Alibekova; Ulyana Balaganskaya; Tamila Muridova; Jamilya Yunusbayeva	Women's épée	Mongolia (MGL); W 45–25	Hong Kong (HKG); L 26–45	Did not advance		7
Aibike Khabibullina; Tamara Pochekutova; Tatyana Prikhodko; Aigerim Sarybay	Women's sabre	Bye	Hong Kong (HKG); W 45–40	China (CHN); L 25–45	Did not advance	3rd place, bronze medalist(s)

== Field hockey ==
Kazakhstan entered both men's and women's team that were placed in the pool B respectively.

Summary

Team	Event	Group Stage						Semifinal	Final / BM / Pl.	
Team	Event	Opposition Score	Opposition Score	Opposition Score	Opposition Score	Opposition Score	Rank	Opposition Score	Opposition Score	Rank
Kazakhstan men's	Men's tournament	Malaysia; L 2–16	Bangladesh; L 1–6	Pakistan; L 0–16	Oman; L 0–4	Thailand; L 2–3	6	Did not advance	Hong Kong; W 3–2^{P} FT: 2–2	11
Kazakhstan women's	Women's tournament	Thailand; W 3–1	India; L 0–21	Indonesia; L 1–2	South Korea; L 0–8	—N/a	5	Did not advance	Hong Kong; L 0–2	10

=== Men's tournament ===
Roster

The following is the Kazakhstan roster in the men's field hockey tournament of the 2018 Asian Games.

Head coach: (Kazakhstan) Olga Urmanova

1. Daulet Urmanov
2. Elomon Ortikboyev
5. Ilgam Abdulabayev
7. Meirlan Toibekov
8. Maxat Zhokenbayev
10. Yermek Tashkeyev
11. Miras Zhakanov
13. Adilzhan Kudaibergen
14. Arsen Podolyakin
15. Aman Yelubayev
16. Yerzhan Yelubayev (GK)
17. Nurbol Kozhym
20. Yerkebulan Dyussebekov
21. Tilek Uzbek
23. Nurzhan Mukhamadiyev
32. Lenur Vishnyakov (GK)

Pool B

Pos	Team	Pld	W	D	L	PF	PA	PD	Pts	Qualification
1	Pakistan	5	5	0	0	45	1	+44	15	Semi-finals
2	Malaysia	5	4	0	1	41	6	+35	12	Semi-finals
3	Bangladesh	5	3	0	2	11	15	−4	9	Fifth place game
4	Oman	5	2	0	3	7	19	−12	6	Seventh place game
5	Thailand	5	1	0	4	4	27	−23	3	Ninth place game
6	Kazakhstan	5	0	0	5	5	45	−40	0	Eleventh place game

Source: FIH
Rules for classification: 1) points; 2) goal difference; 3) goals scored; 4) head-to-head result.

20 August 2018
18:00

Malaysia	16–2	Kazakhstan
Fa. Saari 2', 43', 53'; Jali 6'; Rahim 8', 34', 43', 48', 56'; Nik Rozemi 9', 13'; Saabah 20', 21'; Hasan 23'; Syafiq 30'; Tajuddin 38'	Report	Yelubayev 14'; Abdulabayev 55'

Umpires:
You Saolong (CHN)
Dayan Dissanayake (SRI)

22 August 2018
10:00

Kazakhstan	1–6	Bangladesh
Tashkeyev 52'	Report	Rabby 11'; Mahmud 14'; Mainul Islam 19'; Rahman 32', 48'; Chayan 60'

Umpires:
Raghu Prasad (IND)
Michihiko Watanabe (JPN)

24 August 2018
16:00

Kazakhstan	0–16	Pakistan
	Report	Arshad 2', 34', 47', 60'; Dilber 7'; Shan 13', 38'; Bhutta 15', 58'; Mahmood 29', 30', 38'; R. Ali 51', 55'; Atiq 59'; M. Ali 60+'

Umpires:
Dayan Dissanayake (SRI)
Michihiko Watanabe (JPN)

26 August 2018
14:00

Oman	4–0	Kazakhstan
Al-Qasmi 14'; Al-Shibli 30'; Al-Shaaibi 49'; Al-Hasani 52'	Report

Umpires:
Raghu Prasad (IND)
Kim Hong-lae (KOR)

28 August 2018
12:00

Thailand	3–2	Kazakhstan
Harapan 4'; Boon-Art 18'; Samoechai 22'	Report	Yelubayev 29'; Zhokenbayev 52'

Umpires:
Dayan Dissanayake (SRI)
You Suolong (CHN)

Eleventh place game

1 September 2018
12:30

Hong Kong	2–2	Kazakhstan
Iu 12'; Tso 55'	Report	Tashkeyev 21', 34'
Penalties
Cheun (penalty shoot-out missed); Iu (penalty shoot-out scored); Chan (penalty shoot-out scored); Monthong (penalty shoot-out missed); Ho (penalty shoot-out missed)	2–3	(penalty shoot-out scored) Yelubayev; (penalty shoot-out missed) Mukhamadiyev; (penalty shoot-out missed) Dyussebekov; (penalty shoot-out scored) Tashkeyev; (penalty shoot-out scored) Urmanov

Umpires:
Michihiko Watanabe (JPN)
Hafiz Atif Latif (PAK)

=== Women's tournament ===
Roster

The following is the Kazakhstan roster in the women's field hockey tournament of the 2018 Asian Games.

Head coach: (Kazakhstan) Nurzhan Beibitov

1. Guzal Bakhavaddin(GK)
2. Assel Mukasheva
3. Dilnaz Khairusheva
4. Natalya Sazontova
5. Alina Bissirova
6. Nagima Koishybek
7. Viktoriya Lyapina
8. Sabina Nursilanova
9. Karina Kassumova
10. Vera Domashneva
11. Elvira Utigenova
12. Malida Srazhaddinova
13. Alissa Chepkassova
14. Irina Dobrioglo
15. Natalya Gataulina (C)
16. Alexandra Lipunova
17. Symbat Sabazova

Pool B

Pos	Team	Pld	W	D	L	PF	PA	PD	Pts	Qualification
1	India	4	4	0	0	38	1	+37	12	Semifinals
2	South Korea	4	3	0	1	17	4	+13	9	Semifinals
3	Thailand	4	1	0	3	3	11	−8	3	5th place game
4	Indonesia (H)	4	1	0	3	2	16	−14	3	7th place game
5	Kazakhstan	4	1	0	3	4	32	−28	3	9th place game

Source: FIH
Rules for classification: 1) points; 2) goal difference; 3) goals scored; 4) head-to-head result.
(H) Hosts

19 August 2018
14:00

Thailand	1–3	Kazakhstan
Aunjai 58'	Report	Domashneva 21'; Gataulina 33'; Sazontova 50'

Umpires:
Kelly Hudson (NZL)
Ayanna McClean (TTO)

21 August 2018
20:00

India	21–0	Kazakhstan
Gurjit 7', 36', 44', 52'; Lalremsiami 9', 19', 30'; Goyal 10'; Navneet 11', 12', 49'; Navjot 16', 54'; Katariya 29', 37', 53'; Udita 34'; Minz 38', 45'; Ekka 43'; Malik 55'	Report

Umpires:
Liu Xiaoying (CHN)
Cookie Tan (SGP)

23 August 2018
14:00

Kazakhstan	1–2	Indonesia
Sazontova 6'	Report	Suwito 59'; El Islany 60'

Umpires:
Chieko Soma (JPN)
Chen Jianjun (CHN)

27 August 2018
16:00

South Korea	8–0	Kazakhstan
Park S 9', 10', 30'; Cho 33'; Lee Yo. 36'; Cheon 40', 47'; Kim O 58'	Report

Umpires:
Chieko Soma (JPN)
Chen Jianjun (CHN)

Ninth place game

31 August 2018
15:00

Hong Kong	2–0	Kazakhstan
Lo 21'; Chan YM 52'	Report

Umpires:
Junko Wagatsuma (JPN)
Binish Hayat (PAK)

== Golf ==
Men

Athlete	Event	Round 1	Round 2	Round 3	Round 4	Total		
Athlete	Event	Score	Score	Score	Score	Score	Par	Rank
Daulet Tuleubayev	Individual	74	72	75	74	295	+7	32
Sherkhan Sugur	Individual	86	93	86	85	350	+62	82
Adilet Kozhabergen	Individual	82	85	83	76	326	+38	77
Adil Mukhamejanov	Individual	86	87	82	97	352	+64	83
Daulet Tuleubayev; Sherkhan Sugur; Adilet Kozhabergen; Adil Mukhamejanov	Team	242	244	240	235	961	+97	18

Women

Athlete	Event	Round 1	Round 2	Round 3	Round 4	Total		
Athlete	Event	Score	Score	Score	Score	Score	Par	Rank
Albina Agayeva	Individual	83	89	88	84	344	+56	36
Rivekka Jumagulova	Individual	81	76	71	73	301	+13	28
Albina Agayeva; Rivekka Jumagulova	Team	164	165	159	157	645	+69	12

== Handball ==
Kazakhstan entered in group A at the women's team event.

Summary

Key:

- ET – After extra time
- P – Match decided by penalty-shootout.

Team	Event	Preliminary	Standing	Semifinals / Pl.	Final / BM / Pl.	
Team	Event	Opposition Score	Standing	Opposition Score	Opposition Score	Rank
Kazakhstan women's	Women's tournament	Group A India: W 36–19; China: W 27–26; North Korea: L 33–37; South Korea: L 22–34	4	Hong Kong; W 35–23	North Korea; L 30–32	6

=== Women's tournament ===
Roster

- Irina Danilova
- Olga Tankina
- Sevara Rejemtova
- Anna Kazachenko
- Veronika Khardina
- Kristina Kapralova
- Yelena Suyazova
- Tatyana Parfenova
- Arailym Abdikhamit
- Irina Alexandrova
- Tatyana Davydova
- Natalya Ilyina
- Mariya Pupchenkova
- Valeriya Karavayeva
- Viktoriya Kolotinskaya
- Dana Abilda

Group A

Pos	Team	Pld	W	D	L	GF	GA	GD	Pts	Qualification
1	South Korea	4	4	0	0	151	86	+65	8	Semifinals
2	China	4	2	0	2	120	112	+8	4 (Note: Tied on head-to-head points (2). Head-to-head goal difference: CHN +2, PRK +1, KAZ −3.)	Semifinals
3	North Korea	4	2	0	2	139	125	+14	4	Classification 5th–8th
4	Kazakhstan	4	2	0	2	118	116	+2	4	Classification 5th–8th
5	India	4	0	0	4	77	166	−89	0	Classification 9th–10th

Source: AHF
Notes:

14 August; 11:00	India	19–36	Kazakhstan	POPKI Sports Hall, Jakarta; Referees: Lee, Koo (KOR)
14 August; 11:00	Rimpi 8	(13–19)	Abilda 8	POPKI Sports Hall, Jakarta; Referees: Lee, Koo (KOR)
14 August; 11:00	2× (yellow card) 5× (suspension)		2× (yellow card) 2× (suspension)	POPKI Sports Hall, Jakarta; Referees: Lee, Koo (KOR)

16 August; 18:00	China	26–27	Kazakhstan	POPKI Sports Hall, Jakarta; Referees: Hizaki, Ikebuchi (JPN)
16 August; 18:00	Li Y. 6	(11–11)	Abilda 7	POPKI Sports Hall, Jakarta; Referees: Hizaki, Ikebuchi (JPN)
16 August; 18:00	1× (yellow card) 8× (suspension)		5× (suspension)	POPKI Sports Hall, Jakarta; Referees: Hizaki, Ikebuchi (JPN)

19 August; 18:00	Kazakhstan	33–37	North Korea	POPKI Sports Hall, Jakarta; Referees: Shakir, Kadhim (IRQ)
19 August; 18:00	Abilda 10	(17–17)	O 9	POPKI Sports Hall, Jakarta; Referees: Shakir, Kadhim (IRQ)
19 August; 18:00	3× (yellow card) 1× (suspension)		4× (suspension)	POPKI Sports Hall, Jakarta; Referees: Shakir, Kadhim (IRQ)

23 August; 16:00	South Korea	34–22	Kazakhstan	POPKI Sports Hall, Jakarta; Referees: Li, Ke (CHN)
23 August; 16:00	Yu 7	(17–11)	Suyazova, Abilda 5	POPKI Sports Hall, Jakarta; Referees: Li, Ke (CHN)
23 August; 16:00	1× (yellow card) 2× (suspension)		1× (yellow card) 3× (suspension)	POPKI Sports Hall, Jakarta; Referees: Li, Ke (CHN)

5–8th place semifinal

25 August; 18:00	Hong Kong	23–35	Kazakhstan	POPKI Sports Hall, Jakarta; Referees: Lee, Lee (KOR)
25 August; 18:00	Cheung M. 7	(9–15)	Ilyina 10	POPKI Sports Hall, Jakarta; Referees: Lee, Lee (KOR)
25 August; 18:00	2× (yellow card) 2× (suspension)		2× (yellow card) 2× (suspension)	POPKI Sports Hall, Jakarta; Referees: Lee, Lee (KOR)

Fifth place game

29 August; 16:00	North Korea	32–30	Kazakhstan	POPKI Sports Hall, Jakarta; Referees: Ota, Shimajiri (JPN)
29 August; 16:00	Mun U. 12	(16–13)	Ilyina 9	POPKI Sports Hall, Jakarta; Referees: Ota, Shimajiri (JPN)
29 August; 16:00	2× (yellow card) 3× (suspension)		1× (yellow card) 5× (suspension)	POPKI Sports Hall, Jakarta; Referees: Ota, Shimajiri (JPN)

== Ju-jitsu ==
Key:

- ADV – Won by advantages.
- RDC – Won by referee decision.
- SUB – Won by submission.

Men

Athlete	Event	Round of 64	Round of 32	Round of 16	Quarterfinals	Semifinals	Repechage	Final / BM	Rank
Athlete	Event	Opposition Result	Opposition Result	Opposition Result	Opposition Result	Opposition Result	Opposition Result	Opposition Result	Rank
Kuandyk Konyssov	–56 kg	—N/a	Bye	AM Ikhsan (INA); W 100^{SUB}–0	Ö Erdenebaatar (MGL); L 0–4	Did not advance	A Amirov (UZB); L 0–100^{SUB}	Did not advance	
Nurzhan Seiduali	–56 kg	—N/a	JV Cortez (PHI); W 100^{SUB}–0	HW Hidayat (INA); W 100^{SUB}–0	K Meredow (TKM); W 100^{SUB}–0	K Al-Blooshi (UAE); L 0–5	Bye	A Amirov (UZB); W 4–2	3rd place, bronze medalist(s)
Darkhan Nortayev	–62 kg	—N/a	M Abu-Drees (BRN); W 2–0	CA Pena (PHI); W 2–0	A Kekenov (KGZ); W 2–0	S Al-Mazrouei (UAE); W 4–0	—N/a	O Al-Fadhli (UAE); W 0^{ADV}–0	1st place, gold medalist(s)
Abubakir Zhanibek	–62 kg	—N/a	D Chia (SGP); W 3–0	D Hilal (LBN); L 0–2	Did not advance				
Nartay Kazhekov	–69 kg	—N/a	M Batbileg (MGL); W 100^{SUB}–0	J Muminov (UZB); W 2–0	G Al-Harahsheh (JOR); W 0^{ADV}–0	T Al-Kirbi (UAE); L 0–0^{ADV}	Bye	J Hojamyradow (TKM); W 0^{ADV}–0	3rd place, bronze medalist(s)
Mansur Khabibulla	–69 kg	—N/a	M Davaador (MGL); W 2–0	TB Uulu (KGZ); L 0–0^{ADV}	Did not advance				
Ruslan Israilov	–77 kg	Bye	MM Davar (IRI); W 100^{SUB}–0	H Al-Rasheed (JOR); W 0^{RDC}–0	A Mustakov (KGZ); W 4–0	B Erkhbaya (MGL); W 6–0	—N/a	N Alymkulov (KGZ); W 2–0	1st place, gold medalist(s)
Olzhas Nurtakanov	–77 kg	Bye	M Sharipov (UZB); L 0–2	Did not advance					
Andrey Gavriluk	–85 kg	—N/a	Bye	B Al-Kuzai (JOR); W 0^{ADV}–0	M Murtazaliev (KGZ); L 0–0^{RDC}	Did not advance	A Abdulloev (TJK); W 17–0	A Murtazaliev (KGZ); L 0–0^{ADV}	–
Usman Tsutsoev	–85 kg	—N/a	M Joraýew (TKM); L 0–4	Did not advance					
Ramazan Kussainov	–94 kg	—N/a	R Sagdeev (KGZ); W 0^{ADV}–0	HT Saputra (UAE); W 100^{SUB}–0	Z Granduke (JOR); L 0–100^{SUB}	Did not advance	E Al-Sumaid (KUW); W 7–2	Hwang M-s (KOR); L 0–100^{SUB}	–
Rizat Makhashev	–94 kg	—N/a	Bye	N Netthip (THA); W 100^{SUB}–0	Hwang M-s (KOR); L 0–9	Did not advance	MA Noor (INA); W 100^{SUB}–0	I Juraev (UZB); W 4^{ADV}–4	3rd place, bronze medalist(s)

Women

Athlete	Event	Round of 32	Round of 16	Quarterfinals	Semifinals	Repechage	Final / BM	Rank
Athlete	Event	Opposition Result	Opposition Result	Opposition Result	Opposition Result	Opposition Result	Opposition Result	Rank
Moldir Mekenbayeva	–49 kg	Bye	M Bayarmaa (MGL); L 0–2	Did not advance				
Galina Duvanova	–62 kg	Bye	Y Kakish (JOR); L 0–0^{ADV}	Did not advance				
Aidyam Kurbanova	–62 kg	W Krowýakowa (TKM); L 0–3	Did not advance					

== Judo ==
Key:

- 1st number — Ippon
- 2nd number — Waza-ari
- s — Shido

Men

Athlete	Event	Round of 32	Round of 16	Quarterfinals	Semifinals	Repechage	Final / BM	Rank
Athlete	Event	Opposition Result	Opposition Result	Opposition Result	Opposition Result	Opposition Result	Opposition Result	Rank
Yeldos Smetov	–60 kg	Bye	MA Lubis (INA); W 10s1–00s2	An J-y (PRK); L 00s3–10s2	Did not advance	Shang Y (CHN); L 00–10	Did not advance	
Yeldos Zhumakanov	–66 kg	Bye	S Nakano (PHI); W 10–00	B Erkhembayar (MGL); W 10–00	J Maruyama (JPN); L 00–10s1	Bye	A El-Idrissi (QAT); W 10s1–00s1	3rd place, bronze medalist(s)
Zhansay Smagulov	–73 kg	Bye	Kim C-g (PRK); L 00s1–10	Did not advance				
Didar Khamza	–81 kg	Bye	M Terada (THA); W 01s1–00s1	O Uuganbaatar (MGL); W 10–00s1	T Sakaki (JPN); W 10–01	—N/a	S Mollaei (IRI); W 10s2–01s3	1st place, gold medalist(s)
Islam Bozbayev	–90 kg	Bye	K Hantratin (THA); W 01s2–00s2	M Baker (JPN); L 00s3–10s1	Did not advance	T Tejenov (TKM); W 10s1–00	K Ustopiriyon (TJK); L 00s2–01s2	–
Viktor Demyanenko	–100 kg	Bye	SH Shah (PAK); W 10s1–00	I Remarenco (UAE); L 00s1–01	Did not advance	S Saidov (TJK); L 00–10s1	Did not advance	
Sanzhar Zhabborov	+100 kg	—N/a	S Mirmamadov (TJK); L 00s1–10	Did not advance				

Women

Athlete	Event	Round of 32	Round of 16	Quarterfinals	Semifinals	Repechage	Final / BM	Rank
Athlete	Event	Opposition Result	Opposition Result	Opposition Result	Opposition Result	Opposition Result	Opposition Result	Rank
Galbadrakhyn Otgontsetseg	–48 kg	—N/a	Bye	Jon Y-s (PRK); W 01–00s1	A Kondo (JPN); L 00–10s1	Bye	Xiong Y (CHN); W 10–00s1	3rd place, bronze medalist(s)
Kamshat Karassaikyzy	–52 kg	Bye	Rim S-s (PRK); L 00s3–11	Did not advance				
Sevara Nishanbayeva	–57 kg	Bye	NKA Pandini (INA); W 10–00	Leung PS (HKG); W 01s2–00s1	Kim J-a (PRK); L 00–01	Bye	Lien C-l (TPE); L 00–10	–
Iolanta Berdybekova	–63 kg	—N/a	O Senatham (THA); L 00–10	Did not advance				
Zere Bektaskyzy	–70 kg	—N/a	Nguyễn TDT (VIE); W 10–00	Kwon S-y (PRK); W 01–00	S Niizoe (JPN); L 00–10	Bye	T Naranjargal (MGL); L 00s3–10s2	–
Zarina Raifova	–78 kg	—N/a	Bye	N Yuldasheva (UZB); L 00–01s2	Did not advance	P Shrestha (NEP); W 10s1–00s3	Ma ZZ (CHN); L 00–10	–
Gulzhan Issanova	+78 kg	—N/a	Bye	Tsai J-w (TPE); W 10–00s3	A Sone (JPN); L 00s3–10s1	Bye	B Mönkhtuyaa (MGL); W 10s2–00s3	3rd place, bronze medalist(s)

Mixed

Athlete	Event	Round of 16	Quarterfinals	Semifinals	Repechage	Final / BM	Rank
Athlete	Event	Opposition Result	Opposition Result	Opposition Result	Opposition Result	Opposition Result	Rank
Zere Bektaskyzy; Iolanta Berdybekova; Islam Bozbayev; Gulzhan Issanova; Kamshat Karassaikyzy; Yerassyl Kazhybayev; Didar Khamza; Sevara Nishanbayeva; Zarina Raifova; Zhansay Smagulov; Sanzhar Zhabborov; Yeldos Zhumakanov	Team	Bye	India (IND); W 4–0	Uzbekistan (UZB); W 4–3	—N/a	Japan (JPN); L 0–4	2nd place, silver medalist(s)

== Kurash ==
Men

Athlete	Event	Round of 32	Round of 16	Quarterfinal	Semifinal	Final	
Athlete	Event	Opposition Score	Opposition Score	Opposition Score	Opposition Score	Opposition Score	Rank
Nurlybek Aldaberganov	–66 kg	Nguyễn HB (VIE); W 015−000	S Yuosuf (AFG); L 000−010	Did not advance			
Dauren Damen	–66 kg	A Mones (YEM); W 100−000	GA Ghanbari (IRI); L 000−112	Did not advance			
Zhanibek Sultan	–81 kg	M Ahmed (IRQ); W 112−011	S Shomurodov (UZB); L 000−003	Did not advance			
Ayan Yermekbayev	–81 kg	P Suwannaphueng (THA); L 004−100	Did not advance				
Yersultan Muzapparov	–90 kg	A Ishaqzai (AFG); W 112−001	Lê AT (VIE); W 002−000	Lo Y-h (TPE); W 101−000	Y Imamov (UZB); L 001−010	Did not advance	3rd place, bronze medalist(s)
Bekbol Nurlanuly	+90 kg	Bye	M Sarwari (AFG); L 000−100	Did not advance			

Women

Athlete	Event	Round of 32	Round of 16	Quarterfinal	Semifinal	Final	
Athlete	Event	Opposition Score	Opposition Score	Opposition Score	Opposition Score	Opposition Score	Rank
Botagoz Dyussembayeva	–52 kg	Bye	T Azarpeivand (IRI); L 002−010	Did not advance			
Akhzhol Kaiypkan	–52 kg	Bye	G Sulaymanova (UZB); L 000−101	Did not advance			
Ulzhan Dyussembayeva	–63 kg	Huang S-h (TPE); L 001−002	Did not advance				
Nazgul Kubasheva	–63 kg	Bye	A Koulivand (IRI); W 100−001	B Baasanjargal (MGL); L 001−001	Did not advance		
Galiyabanu Amankhanova	–78 kg	Bye	D Bozorova (UZB); W 100−000	Nguyễn TL (VIE); L 010−010	Did not advance		
Kalzhan Taizhanova	–78 kg	Bye	Trần TTT (VIE); W 012−000	K Yuldashova (UZB); L 000−101	Did not advance		

== Modern pentathlon ==
Athlete	Event	Swimming (200 m freestyle)		Fencing (épée one touch)		Riding (show jumping)		Laser-run (shooting 10 m air pistol/ running 3200 m)		Total points	Final rank
Athlete	Event	Rank	MP points	Rank	MP points	Rank	MP points	Rank	MP points	Total points	Final rank
Pavel Ilyashenko	Men's	12	289	3	228	3	299	5	609	1425	5
Vladislav Sukharev	Men's	3	312	10	186	12	0 (EL)	10	557	1055	12
Ardak Akhidullayeva	Women's	12	240	3	236	9	0 (EL)	2	543	1019	9
Yelena Potapenko	Women's	5	286	7	213	6	244	8	466	1209	7

== Rowing ==
Men

Athlete	Event	Heats		Repechage		Final	
Athlete	Event	Time	Rank	Time	Rank	Time	Rank
Vladislav Yakovlev	Single sculls	8:12.64	4 R	7:43.46	2 FA	7:39.39	4
Anastas Shashkov; Yevgeniy Vassilyev	Double sculls	7:45.76	4 R	7:45.39	5 FB	7:30.18	8
Yevgeniy Tatsey; Anastas Shashkov; Grigoriy Feklistov; Vitaliy Vassilyev	Quadruple sculls	6:44.63	3 R	6:51.31	5 FB	6:35.89	7
Mikhail Taskin; Yevgeniy Vassilyev	Coxless pair	7:48.53	5 FA	—N/a		7:30.59	5
Ivan Exuzidi	Lightweight single sculls	7:58.91	3 R	8:19.22	3 FB	7:47.94	9

Women

Athlete	Event	Heats		Repechage		Final	
Athlete	Event	Time	Rank	Time	Rank	Time	Rank
Alexandra Opachanova	Single sculls	9:08.34	2 R	8:31.87	1 FA	8:19.32	3rd place, bronze medalist(s)
Alina Mochula; Mariya Poida	Double sculls	8:35.97	5 FA	—N/a		8:01.95	5
Svetlana Germanovich; Viktoriya Chepikova	Coxless pair	8:41.58	3 R	8:39.55	2 FA	8:24.78	6
Mariya Poida; Alexandra Opachanova; Svetlana Germanovich; Viktoriya Chepikova	Coxless four	7:32.32	1 FA	Bye		7:23.15	4
Alina Mochula	Lightweight single sculls	8:48.09	4 FA	—N/a		8:39.12	4

== Rugby sevens ==
Kazakhstan rugby sevens women's team drawn in the group B at the Games.

Team	Event	Group Stage				Quarterfinal	Semifinal / Pl.	Final / BM / Pl.	
Team	Event	Opposition Score	Opposition Score	Opposition Score	Rank	Opposition Score	Opposition Score	Opposition Score	Rank
Kazakhstan women's	Women's tournament	Thailand; W 20–5	Japan; L 21–31	Indonesia; W 54–0	2 Q	Singapore; W 34–0	Japan; L 12–26	Thailand; W 29–7	3rd place, bronze medalist(s)

=== Women's tournament ===
Squad

The following is the Kazakhstan squad in the women's rugby sevens tournament of the 2018 Asian Games.

Head coach: (Russia) Valeriy Popov

- Veronika Stepanyuga
- Nigora Nurmatova
- Karina Proskurina
- Yeva Bekker
- Vlada Odnoletok
- Olessya Teryayeva
- Kundyzay Baktybayeva
- Anna Yakovleva
- Svetlana Klyuchnikova
- Balzhan Koishybayeva
- Darya Tkachyova
- Lyudmila Korotkikh

Group B

Pos	Team	Pld	W	D	L	PF	PA	PD	Pts	Qualification
1	Japan	3	3	0	0	122	21	+101	9	Quarterfinals
2	Kazakhstan	3	2	0	1	95	36	+59	7	Quarterfinals
3	Thailand	3	1	0	2	58	51	+7	5	Quarterfinals
4	Indonesia	3	0	0	3	5	172	−167	3	Quarterfinals

Source: Results

30 August
12:06

Kazakhstan	20–5	Thailand
Try: Nurmatova 7' m Korotkikh (3) 7+' m, 8' m, 10' m Con: Baktybayeva (0/2); Nurmatova (0/1)		Try: Wittayaronnayut 13' m Con: Chomphumee (0/1)

Gelora Bung Karno Rugby Field, Jakarta
Referee: Sakurako Kawasaki (Japan)

30 August
15:46

Japan	31–21	Kazakhstan
Try: Otake 2' c Okuroda 6' c Hirano 7+' m Nagata 8' c Kozasa 11' m Con: Otake (1/1); Okuroda (2/4)		Try: Korotkikh (2) 4' c, 12' c Nurmatova 9' c Con: Baktybayeva (3/3)

Gelora Bung Karno Rugby Field, Jakarta
Referee: Charlie Brown (Ireland)

31 August
11:36

Kazakhstan	54–0	Indonesia
Try: Yakovleva 1' m Korotkikh (3) 4' m, 5' c, 6' m Stepanyuga 7+' m Teryayeva 8' m Proskurina 10' m Odnoletok (2) 12' m, 13' c Tkachyova 14' m Con: Baktybayeva (2/7); Nurmatova (0/3)

Gelora Bung Karno Rugby Field, Jakarta
Referee: Craig Chan (Canada)

Quarterfinal

31 August
15:24

Singapore	0–34	Kazakhstan
		Try: Korotkikh (2) 1' c, 9' m Nurmatova 3' c Baktybayeva (2) 7+' m, 11' m Tkachyova 14+' m Con: Baktybayeva (2/5); Nurmatova (0/1)

Gelora Bung Karno Rugby Field, Jakarta
Referee: Sakurako Kawasaki (Japan)

Semifinal

1 September
15:50

Kazakhstan	12–26	Japan
Try: Korotkikh (2) 7' m, 12' c Con: Baktybayeva (0/1); Nurmatova (1/1)		Try: Otake (2) 2' m, 7+' c Okuroda 5' c Penalty try 14' m Con: Okuroda (2/3)

Gelora Bung Karno Rugby Field, Jakarta
Referee: Craig Chan (Canada)

Bronze medal game

1 September
19:52

Thailand	7–29	Kazakhstan
Try: Penalty try 10' m		Try: Korotkikh (2) 2' c, 7+' m Stepanyuga 4' m Baktybayeva (2) 12' c, 14' m Con: Baktybayeva (2/4); Nurmatova (0/1)

Gelora Bung Karno Rugby Field, Jakarta
Referee: Ai Yoshida (Japan)

== Sailing ==
Men

Athlete	Event	Race												Total	Rank
Athlete	Event	1	2	3	4	5	6	7	8	9	10	11	12	Total	Rank
Ruslan Jangazov	Laser	12	12	~~(13)~~	11	11	12	11	12	11	12	11	12	127	12
Berik Kubayev; Yevgeniy Yugay	470	~~(12)~~; DNS	11	11	11	11	11	11	9	11	11	10	11	118	11

Women

Athlete	Event	Race												Total	Rank
Athlete	Event	1	2	3	4	5	6	7	8	9	10	11	12	Total	Rank
Karina Jangazova	Laser Radial	9	~~(10)~~	10	10	10	10	7	10	9	9	7	9	100	10

== Sambo ==
Key:

- SU – Won by submission.

Athlete	Event	Round of 32	Round of 16	Quarterfinal	Semifinal	Repechage 1	Repechage 2	Repechage final	Final / BM	
Athlete	Event	Opposition Result	Opposition Result	Opposition Result	Opposition Result	Opposition Result	Opposition Result	Opposition Result	Opposition Result	Rank
Baglan Ibragim	Men's 52 kg	Bye	G Mönkhbat (MGL); W 4–0 ^{Dsq}	K Yamamoto (JPN); W 2^{SU}–0	K Dzhomii (TJK); W 4–3	Bye			S Erdenebaatar (MGL); W 2^{SU}–4	1st place, gold medalist(s)
Beimbet Kanzhanov	Men's 52 kg	Bye	S Sangov (TJK); W 2–1	A Rakhmatilloev (UZB); W 5–1	S Erdenebaatar (MGL); L 0–8	Bye			I Akhmedjanov (UZB); W 4–3	3rd place, bronze medalist(s)
Aibol Aitbek	Men's 90 kg	M Ali (BRN); W 4–4 ^{Dsq}	R Esgerow (TKM); W 1–1	N Yokubov (UZB); W 5–4	U Khasanbekov (TJK); L 1–1	Bye			A Zekenov (KAZ); L 1–3	4
Alibek Zekenov	Men's 90 kg	K Tsagaanbaatar (MGL); W 13–2	K Ustopiriyon (TJK); L 3–11	Did not advance		Bye	N Orazmämmedow (TKM); W 2–0	I Amirkhani (IRI); W 1^{SU}–0	A Aitbek (KAZ); W 3–1	3rd place, bronze medalist(s)
Nazgul Yelmuratova	Women's 48 kg	—N/a	B Oidovchimed (MGL); L 0–5	Did not advance		N Gulova (UZB); L 2–2	—N/a	Did not advance		
Aizhan Zhylkybayeva	Women's 48 kg	—N/a	Bye	G Narantsetseg (MGL); L 0–5^{SU}	Did not advance	A Nurajijah (INA); W 8–2	—N/a	A Zaripowa (TKM); W 2–0	MM Ince (INA); W 7^{SU}–1	3rd place, bronze medalist(s)
Dinara Kudarova	Women's 68 kg	Bye	T Battsetseg (MGL); W 3–3	A Kadyrbekova (KGZ); W 3–1	N Davletova (UZB); L 3–1^{SU}	Bye			N Tomi (JPN); L 1–8	4
Dildash Kuryshbayeva	Women's 68 kg	Bye	A Estebesova (KGZ); W 4^{SU}–1	N Tomi (JPN); W 1–0	M Davaasüren (MGL); W 3–1	Bye			N Davletova (UZB); W 5–0	1st place, gold medalist(s)

== Shooting ==
Men

Athlete	Event	Qualification		Final	
Athlete	Event	Points	Rank	Points	Rank
Vladimir Issachenko	10 m air pistol	579	7 Q	136.1	7
Rashid Yunusmetov	10 m air pistol	573	18	Did not advance	
Sergey Vokhmyanin	25 m rapid fire pistol	560	18	Did not advance	
Alexey Kleimyonov	10 m air rifle	616.4	27	Did not advance	
Yuriy Yurkov	10 m air rifle	618.5	18	Did not advance	
Alexey Kleimyonov	50 m rifle three positions	1154	13	Did not advance	
Yuriy Yurkov	50 m rifle three positions	1159	8 Q	418.8	5
Bakhtiyar Ibrayev	10 m running target	562	9	Did not advance	
Rassim Mologly	10 m running target	544	13	Did not advance	
Bakhtiyar Ibrayev	10 m running target mixed	—N/a		377	5
Rassim Mologly	10 m running target mixed	—N/a		375	6
Viktor Khassyanov	Trap	117	12	Did not advance	
Andrey Mogilevskiy	Trap	115	17	Did not advance	
Viktor Khassyanov	Double trap	125	17	Did not advance	
Maxim Kolomoyets	Double trap	127	15	Did not advance	
Vladislav Mukhamediyev	Skeet	124 EQAsR	1 Q	12	6
Alexandr Yechshenko	Skeet	120	10	Did not advance	

Women

Athlete	Event	Qualification		Final	
Athlete	Event	Points	Rank	Points	Rank
Zauresh Baibussinova	10 m air pistol	565	19	Did not advance	
Yuliya Komendra	10 m air pistol	562	21	Did not advance	
Zauresh Baibussinova	25 m pistol	572	19	Did not advance	
Yuliya Komendra	25 m pistol	572	21	Did not advance	
Alexandra Malinovskaya	10 m air rifle	616.6	22	Did not advance	
Violetta Starostina	10 m air rifle	619.1	20	Did not advance	
Alexandra Malinovskaya	50 m rifle three positions	1157	10	Did not advance	
Violetta Starostina	50 m rifle three positions	1149	14	Did not advance	
Anastassiya Davydova	Trap	107	17	Did not advance	
Mariya Dmitriyenko	Trap	119 EQAsR, QGR	1 Q	27	4
Anastassiya Davydova	Double trap	—N/a		112	9
Mariya Dmitriyenko	Double trap	—N/a		125	3rd place, bronze medalist(s)
Assem Orynbay	Skeet	114	8	Did not advance	
Olga Panarina	Skeet	116	4 Q	14	6

Mixed team

Athlete	Event	Qualification		Final	
Athlete	Event	Points	Rank	Points	Rank
Vladimir Issachenko; Zauresh Baibussinova	10 m air pistol	768	5 Q	323.9	5
Alexey Kleimyonov; Violetta Starostina	10 m air rifle	818.7'	11	Did not advance	
Andrey Mogilevskiy; Oxana Sereda	Trap	133	8	Did not advance	

== Sport climbing ==
Speed

Athlete	Event	Qualification		Round of 16	Quarterfinals	Semifinals	Final / BM	
Athlete	Event	Best	Rank	Opposition Time	Opposition Time	Opposition Time	Opposition Time	Rank
Amir Maimuratov	Men's	6.200	6 Q	P Bunprakop (THA); W FS	Sabri (INA); L F–6.083	Did not advance		8
Roman Kostyukov	Men's	7.271	13 Q	A Jaelolo (INA); L 6.548–5.962	Did not advance			9
Alexandra Zhiznevskaya	Women's	10.133	11 Q	K Lakzaeifar (IRI); L 11.010–9.473	Did not advance			12
Assel Marlenova	Women's	9.102	5 Q	Park S-y (KOR); W 9.236–10.470	Song YL (CHN); L 8.910–8.591	Did not advance		5

Speed relay

Athlete	Event	Qualification		Quarterfinals	Semifinals	Final / BM	
Athlete	Event	Time	Rank	Opposition Time	Opposition Time	Opposition Time	Rank
Kazakhstan 1 Rishat Khaibullin; Roman Kostyukov; Amir Maimuratov	Men's	22.557	6 Q	Indonesia 2 (INA); L 26.018–19.793	Did not advance		8
Kazakhstan 2 Alexey Molchanov; Alisher Murat; Alexandr Nigmatulin	Men's	24.202	7 Q	China 2 (CHN); L 25.645–20.792	Did not advance		7
Kazakhstan 1 Margarita Agambayeva; Assel Marlenova; Alexandra Zhiznevskaya	Women's	FS	12	Did not advance			
Kazakhstan 2 Alina Matevossyan; Anastassiya Postoyenko; Mariya Chistova	Women's	39.094	8 Q	Indonesia 1 (INA); L FS–27.162	Did not advance		8

Combined

Athlete	Event	Qualification					Final				
Athlete	Event	Speed Point	Boulder Point	Lead Point	Total	Rank	Speed Point	Boulder Point	Lead Point	Total	Rank
Artyom Devyaterikov	Men's	12	10	9	1080	14	Did not advance				
Rishat Khaibullin	Men's	3	13	8	312	6 Q	1	4	6	24	4
Assel Marlenova	Women's	1	11	16	176	4 Q	2	6	6	72	5
Margarita Agambayeva	Women's	7	13	10	910	13	Did not advance				

== Swimming ==
Men

Athlete	Event	Heats		Final	
Athlete	Event	Time	Rank	Time	Rank
Dmitriy Balandin	50 m breaststroke	27.53	5 Q	27.46	3rd place, bronze medalist(s)
Dmitriy Balandin	100 m breaststroke	1:00.07	2 Q	59.39	3rd place, bronze medalist(s)
Aibek Kamzenov	50 m breaststroke	28.29	12	Did not advance	
Aibek Kamzenov	100 m breaststroke	1:02.74	14	Did not advance	
Adil Kaskabay	100 m freestyle	49.72	8 Q	49.37	7
Adil Kaskabay	200 m freestyle	1:53.37	17	Did not advance	
Adil Kaskabay	50 m backstroke	26.30	13	Did not advance	
Kenessary Kenenbayev️	1500 m freestyle	—N/a		17:08.44	14
Adilbek Mussin	50 m freestyle	22.63	8 Q	22.64	7
Adilbek Mussin	50 m butterfly	23.91	3 Q	23.73	3rd place, bronze medalist(s)
Adilbek Mussin	100 m butterfly	52.99	5 Q	52.95	5
Alexandr Varakin	50 m freestyle	22.72	9	Did not advance	
Alexandr Varakin	100 m freestyle	51.07	23	Did not advance	
Adil Kaskabay; Dmitriy Balandin; Adilbek Mussin; Alexandr Varakin	4×100 m medley relay	3:38.57	3 Q	3:35.62 (NR)	3rd place, bronze medalist(s)

Women

Athlete	Event	Heats		Final	
Athlete	Event	Time	Rank	Time	Rank
Adelaida Pchelintseva	50 m breaststroke	31.94	8 Q	31.94	7
Adelaida Pchelintseva	100 m breaststroke	1:14.26	15	Did not advance	

== Taekwondo ==
Poomsae

Athlete	Event	Round of 16	Quarterfinal	Semifinal	Final	
Athlete	Event	Opposition Score	Opposition Score	Opposition Score	Opposition Score	Rank
Ruslan Manaspayev	Men's individual	R Jr. Reyes (PHI); L 7.08–8.08	Did not advance			
Yerlan Nurkanov; Artem Chshelkov; Vyacheslav Chzhen	Men's team	Indonesia; L 7.63–8.30	Did not advance			

Kyorugi

Athlete	Event	Round of 32	Round of 16	Quarterfinal	Semifinal	Final	
Athlete	Event	Opposition Score	Opposition Score	Opposition Score	Opposition Score	Opposition Score	Rank
Yeldos Yskak	Men's −58 kg	Z Mustafa (JOR); W 17–6	M Rezaee (AFG); W 46–40	Kim T-h (KOR); L 9–11	Did not advance		
Kazybek Baktiyaruly	Men's −63 kg	Bye	B B Mahara (NEP); W 30–19	Ho C-h (TPE); L 0–21	Did not advance		
Yerassyl Kaiyrbek	Men's −68 kg	Bye	N Klompon (THA); W 26–10	R Rozali (MAS); W 12–1	Lee D-h (KOR); L 10–32	Did not advance	3rd place, bronze medalist(s)
Nurlan Myrzabayev	Men's −80 kg	S Al-Muwallad (KSA); W 12–1	Liu W-t (TPE); W 3–1	A Aitakhunov (KGZ); W 22–2	Lee H-j (KOR); L 16–17	Did not advance	3rd place, bronze medalist(s)
Ruslan Zhaparov	Men's +80 kg	—N/a	A Pujari (NEP); W 21–0	N Tantramart (THA); W 30–15	S Rajabi (IRI); L 7–11	Did not advance	3rd place, bronze medalist(s)
Ainur Yesbergenova	Women's −49 kg	Bye	J Canabal (PHI); L 17–18	Did not advance			
Fariza Aldangorova	Women's −53 kg	Bye	D Mamadibragimova (UZB); W 17–16	E Sheidaei (IRI); W 11–3	Su P-y (TPE); L 6–11	Did not advance	3rd place, bronze medalist(s)
Marzhan Tulepbergenova	Women's −57 kg	P Javadi (IRI); W 15–10	Luo ZS (CHN); L 11–14	Did not advance			
Axaule Yerkassimova	Women's −67 kg	—N/a	Kim J-d (KOR); L 9–35	Did not advance			
Cansel Deniz	Women's +67 kg	—N/a	K Alora (PHI); W 8–7	Lâm T H T (VIE); W 16–1	S Osipova (UZB); W 19–3	Lee D-b (KOR); L 21–27	2nd place, silver medalist(s)

== Tennis ==
Men

Athlete	Event	Round of 64	Round of 32	Round of 16	Quarterfinals	Semifinals	Final	
Athlete	Event	Opposition Score	Opposition Score	Opposition Score	Opposition Score	Opposition Score	Opposition Score	Rank
Alexander Bublik	Singles	Bye	P Kovapitukted (THA); W 6–3, 6–2	Y Watanuki (JPN); W 7–6^{7–5}, 6–4	D Istomin (UZB); L 1–6, 0–3 ^{r}	Did not advance		
Denis Yevseyev	Singles	Bye	Trịnh LG (VIE); W 6–1, 6–1	D-h Lee (KOR); L 6–7^{4–7}, 2–6	Did not advance			
Alexander Bublik; Denis Yevseyev	Doubles	Bye	G Batjargal / A Sandag (MGL); W 6–2, 6–1	Li Z / Wu D (CHN); W 6–4, 7–6^{8–6}	S Nagal / R Ramanathan (IND); W 5–7, 6–4, [10–2]	Y Ito / Y Watanuki (JPN); W 6–4, 6–7^{4–7}, [10–7]	R Bopanna / D Sharan (IND); L 3–6, 4–4	2nd place, silver medalist(s)
Timur Khabibulin; Aleksandr Nedovyesov	Doubles	Bye	Y de Silva / S Dissanayake (SRI); W 6–4, 6–2	S Shimabukuro / K Uesugi (JPN); L 6–7^{4–7}, 3–6	Did not advance			

Women

Athlete	Event	Round of 64	Round of 32	Round of 16	Quarterfinals	Semifinals	Final	
Athlete	Event	Opposition Score	Opposition Score	Opposition Score	Opposition Score	Opposition Score	Opposition Score	Rank
Anna Danilina	Singles	Bye	N Abduraimova (UZB); L 6–0, 2–6, 2–6	Did not advance				
Gozal Ainitdinova	Singles	Bye	A Moosa Kaleem (MDV); W 6–0, 6–0	Wang Q (CHN); L 2–6, 4–6	Did not advance			
Dariya Detkovskaya; Zhibek Kulambayeva	Doubles	—N/a	Bye	Ng K-y / Wu H-c (HKG); W 6–2, 6–3	Xu YF / Yang ZX (CHN); L 4–6, 0–6	Did not advance		
Gozal Ainitdinova; Anna Danilina	Doubles	—N/a	M Capadocia / K Lehnert (PHI); W 7–5, 7–5	A Raina / P Thombare (IND); W 6–1, 6–3	Duan YY / Wang YF (CHN); W 2–6, 6–3, [10–5]	Chan H-c / L Chan (TPE); L 0–6, 0–6	Did not advance	3rd place, bronze medalist(s)

Mixed

Athlete	Event	Round of 64	Round of 32	Round of 16	Quarterfinals	Semifinals	Final	
Athlete	Event	Opposition Score	Opposition Score	Opposition Score	Opposition Score	Opposition Score	Opposition Score	Rank
Anna Danilina; Aleksandr Nedovyesov	Doubles	Bye	C Fodor / Phạm MT (VIE); W 6–4, 6–4	K Thandi / D Sharan (IND); W 6–4, 3–6, [10–5]	M Ninomiya / Y Uchiyama (JPN); W 6–1, 6–4	L Kumkhum / So Ratiwatana (THA); L 6–4, 4–6, [10–12]	Did not advance	3rd place, bronze medalist(s)
Gozal Ainitdinova; Timur Khabibulin	Doubles	Bye	Lý-Nguyễn S / Nguyễn PV (VIE); W 6–2, 6–2	XU YF / Zhang Z (CHN); L 1–6, 5–7	Did not advance			

== Triathlon ==
Individual

Athlete	Event	Swim (1.5 km)	Trans 1	Bike (39.6 km)	Trans 2	Run (10 km)	Total Time	Rank
Ayan Beisenbayev	Men's	18:55	0:27	56:29	0:22	34:25	1:50:38	2nd place, silver medalist(s)
Maxim Kriat	Men's	21:39	0:27	56:14	0:29	36:04	1:54:53	11
Anastassiya Avtushko	Women's	23:45	0:33	1:09:58	0:28	46:07	2:20:51	11

== Volleyball ==
=== Beach volleyball ===
Athlete	Event	Preliminary		Round of 16	Quarterfinals	Semifinals	Final / BM	
Athlete	Event	Oppositions Scores	Rank	Opposition Score	Opposition Score	Opposition Score	Opposition Score	Rank
Dmitriy Yakovlev; Sergey Bogatu	Men's tournament	Yapa – Pradeep (SRI): W 2–0; Janko – Samba (QAT): L 0–2; Kim J-y – Kim H-c (KOR): W 2–0	2 Q	Ramadhan – Pribadi (INA): L 1–2	Did not advance			
Alexey Kuleshov; Alexandr Babichev	Men's tournament	Nordin – Saifuddin (MAS): W 2–0; Hsu – Wu (TPE): W 2–0; Gao – Li (CHN): L 0–2	2 Q	Janko – Samba (QAT): L 0–2	Did not advance			
Alina Rachenko; Yelizaveta Yeropkina	Women's tournament	Ratnasari – Eka (INA): L 0–2; Caminha – de Sousa (TLS): W 2–0; Numwong – Hongpak (THA): L 1–2; Futami – Hasegawa (JPN): L 0–2	4	Did not advance				
Tatyana Mashkova; Irina Tsimbalova	Women's tournament	Radarong – Udomchavee (THA): W 2–1; Juliana – Utami (INA): W 2–0; Wong – Ng (HKG):W 2–0; Nguyen – Huynh (VIE): W 2–0	1 Q	Bye	Wang – Xia (CHN); W 2–1	Ishii – Murakami (JPN); L 0–2	Juliana – Utami (INA): L 0–2	4

=== Indoor volleyball ===
Team	Event	Group Stage		Playoffs	Quarterfinals / Pl.	Semifinals / Pl.	Final / BM / Pl.	
Team	Event	Oppositions Scores	Rank	Opposition Score	Opposition Score	Opposition Score	Opposition Score	Rank
Kazakhstan men's	Men's tournament	Myanmar: L 1–3; Japan: L 2–3	3	Did not advance	Kyrgyzstan; L 2–3	Did not advance	Mongolia; W 3–0	17
Kazakhstan women's	Women's tournament	Chinese Taipei: W 3–1; South Korea: L 1–3; India: W 3–0; China: L 0–3; Vietnam: L 2–3	3 Q	—N/a	Japan; L 0–3	Philippines; W 3–2	Vietnam; W 3–1	5

==== Men's tournament ====
Team roster

The following is the Kazakhstan roster in the men's volleyball tournament of the 2018 Asian Games.

Head coach: Igor Nikolchenko

No.	Name	Date of birth	Height	Weight	Spike	Block	Club
1	Roman Fartov	2 December 1992	1.84 m (6 ft 0 in)	83 kg (183 lb)	325 cm (128 in)	315 cm (124 in)	(Kazakhstan) Pavlodar
2	Anton Kuznetsov	25 September 1989	2.04 m (6 ft 8 in)	91 kg (201 lb)	346 cm (136 in)	335 cm (132 in)	(Kazakhstan) Atyrau
6	Kairat Baibekov	28 March 1983	1.75 m (5 ft 9 in)	71 kg (157 lb)	320 cm (130 in)	315 cm (124 in)	(Kazakhstan) Altay
7	Vassiliy Donets	10 July 1988	1.95 m (6 ft 5 in)	90 kg (200 lb)	340 cm (130 in)	325 cm (128 in)	(Kazakhstan) Pavlodar
10	Maxim Michshenko	10 September 1990	1.97 m (6 ft 6 in)	94 kg (207 lb)	355 cm (140 in)	315 cm (124 in)	(Kazakhstan) TNK Kazchrome
11	Damir Akimov	22 September 1991	2.02 m (6 ft 8 in)	100 kg (220 lb)	360 cm (140 in)	330 cm (130 in)	(Kazakhstan) Atyrau
12	Nodirkhan Kadirkhanov (c)	6 September 1991	2.03 m (6 ft 8 in)	85 kg (187 lb)	340 cm (130 in)	330 cm (130 in)	(Kazakhstan) Altay
13	Vitaliy Erdshtein	5 May 1992	2.05 m (6 ft 9 in)	90 kg (200 lb)	350 cm (140 in)	335 cm (132 in)	(Kazakhstan) Burevestnik
14	Aibat Netalin	30 March 1992	1.95 m (6 ft 5 in)	96 kg (212 lb)	330 cm (130 in)	320 cm (130 in)	(Kazakhstan) Atyrau
17	Mikhail Ustinov	22 December 1989	1.89 m (6 ft 2 in)	79 kg (174 lb)	330 cm (130 in)	323 cm (127 in)	(Kazakhstan) Taraz
20	Alexandr Suleimanov	30 April 1997	1.98 m (6 ft 6 in)	70 kg (150 lb)	345 cm (136 in)	337 cm (133 in)	(Kazakhstan) Altay
21	Ivan Minakov	12 September 1991	1.87 m (6 ft 2 in)	70 kg (150 lb)	300 cm (120 in)	280 cm (110 in)	(Kazakhstan) Pavlodar
23	Ivan Russapetov	1 August 1990	2.02 m (6 ft 8 in)	91 kg (201 lb)	350 cm (140 in)	335 cm (132 in)	(Kazakhstan) Ushkyn-Iskra
24	Vitaliy Mironenko	18 May 1985	1.87 m (6 ft 2 in)	90 kg (200 lb)	331 cm (130 in)	329 cm (130 in)	(Kazakhstan) Pavlodar

Pool C

Pos	Team	Pld	W	L	Pts	SW	SL	SR	SPW	SPL	SPR	Qualification
1	Japan	2	2	0	4	6	4	1.500	224	216	1.037	Classification for 1–12
2	Myanmar	2	1	1	4	5	4	1.250	199	191	1.042	Classification for 1–12
3	Kazakhstan	2	0	2	1	3	6	0.500	193	209	0.923	Classification for 13–20

Source: OCA

Date	Time		Score		Set 1	Set 2	Set 3	Set 4	Set 5	Total	Report
20 Aug	16:30	Kazakhstan	1–3	Myanmar	25–17	22–25	19–25	18–25		84–92	Report
22 Aug	12:30	Japan	3–2	Kazakhstan	22–25	25–20	25–27	25–19	20–18	117–109	Report
28 Aug	16:30	Kazakhstan	2–3	Kyrgyzstan	29–27	20–25	25–23	23–25	7–15	104–115	Report
30 Aug	10:00	Mongolia	0–3	Kazakhstan	0–25	0–25	0–25			0–75	Report

==== Women's tournament ====
Team roster

The following is the Kazakhstani roster in the women's volleyball tournament of the 2018 Asian Games.

Head coach: Vyacheslav Shapran

No.	Name	Date of birth	Height	Weight	Spike	Block	Club
1	Tatyana Fendrikova	23 February 1990	1.69 m (5 ft 7 in)	55 kg (121 lb)	280 cm (110 in)	275 cm (108 in)	(Kazakhstan) Almaty
3	Sana Anarkulova	21 July 1989	1.89 m (6 ft 2 in)	74 kg (163 lb)	305 cm (120 in)	280 cm (110 in)	(Kazakhstan) Altay
4	Yekaterina Zhdanova	28 May 1992	1.83 m (6 ft 0 in)	65 kg (143 lb)	280 cm (110 in)	270 cm (110 in)	(Kazakhstan) Zhetyssu
6	Natalya Akilova	31 May 1993	1.83 m (6 ft 0 in)	62 kg (137 lb)	295 cm (116 in)	275 cm (108 in)	(Kazakhstan) Zhetyssu
7	Inna Yakovleva	4 March 1988	1.77 m (5 ft 10 in)	65 kg (143 lb)	200 cm (79 in)	217 cm (85 in)	(Kazakhstan) Zhetyssu
11	Katerina Tatko	15 December 1992	1.82 m (6 ft 0 in)	70 kg (150 lb)	285 cm (112 in)	275 cm (108 in)	(Kazakhstan) Zhetyssu
12	Yana Petrenko	30 July 1990	1.81 m (5 ft 11 in)	71 kg (157 lb)	297 cm (117 in)	265 cm (104 in)	(Kazakhstan) Almaty
13	Radmila Beresneva (C)	6 June 1983	1.85 m (6 ft 1 in)	75 kg (165 lb)	300 cm (120 in)	290 cm (110 in)	(Kazakhstan) Altay
14	Alessya Safronova	10 February 1986	1.92 m (6 ft 4 in)	70 kg (150 lb)	300 cm (120 in)	290 cm (110 in)	(Turkey) İlbank
15	Aliya Batkuldina	18 November 1995	1.81 m (5 ft 11 in)	74 kg (163 lb)	273 cm (107 in)	264 cm (104 in)	(Kazakhstan) Zhetyssu
18	Kristina Anikonova	5 January 1991	1.84 m (6 ft 0 in)	72 kg (159 lb)	295 cm (116 in)	280 cm (110 in)	(Kazakhstan) Altay
19	Kristina Belova	29 November 1998	1.82 m (6 ft 0 in)	72 kg (159 lb)	294 cm (116 in)	285 cm (112 in)	(Kazakhstan) Altay
24	Kristina Karapetan	3 August 1992	1.85 m (6 ft 1 in)	73 kg (161 lb)	280 cm (110 in)	272 cm (107 in)	(Kazakhstan) Irtysh-Kazchrome

Pool B

Pos	Team	Pld	W	L	Pts	SW	SL	SR	SPW	SPL	SPR	Qualification
1	China	5	5	0	15	15	0	MAX	375	216	1.736	Quarterfinals
2	South Korea	5	4	1	12	12	4	3.000	382	299	1.278	Quarterfinals
3	Kazakhstan	5	2	3	7	9	10	0.900	386	406	0.951	Quarterfinals
4	Vietnam	5	2	3	6	8	11	0.727	369	406	0.909	Quarterfinals
5	Chinese Taipei	5	2	3	4	7	13	0.538	370	441	0.839	Classification for 9–11
6	India	5	0	5	1	2	15	0.133	292	406	0.719	Classification for 9–11

Source: OCA

Date	Time		Score		Set 1	Set 2	Set 3	Set 4	Set 5	Total	Report
19 Aug	16:30	Chinese Taipei	1–3	Kazakhstan	15–25	10–25	25–20	20–25		70–95	Report
21 Aug	12:30	South Korea	3–1	Kazakhstan	25–9	25–14	28–30	25–20		103–73	Report
23 Aug	10:00	Kazakhstan	3–0	India	25–8	25–19	25–23			75–50	Report
25 Aug	16:30	Kazakhstan	0–3	China	14–25	15–25	11–25			40–75	Report
27 Aug	16:30	Kazakhstan	2–3	Vietnam	25–20	25–19	27–29	19–25	7–15	103–108	Report
29 Aug	12:30	Japan	3–0	Kazakhstan	25–16	25–18	25–21			75–55	Report
31 Aug	14:30	Philippines	2–3	Kazakhstan	11–25	25–22	15–25	25–19	14–16	90–107	Report
01 Sep	12:30	Vietnam	1–3	Kazakhstan	18–25	25–22	22–25	24–26		89–98	Report

== Water polo ==
Summary

Key:

- FT – After full time.
- P – Match decided by penalty-shootout.

Team	Event	Group Stage						Quarterfinal	Semifinal / Pl.	Final / BM / Pl.	
Team	Event	Opposition Score	Opposition Score	Opposition Score	Opposition Score	Opposition Score	Rank	Opposition Score	Opposition Score	Opposition Score	Rank
Kazakhstan men's	Men's tournament	South Korea; W 16–9	Singapore; W 15–4	Iran; W 9–5	—N/a		1 Q	Indonesia; W 20–4	China; W 9–8	Japan; W 8–7	1st place, gold medalist(s)
Kazakhstan women's	Women's tournament	China; L 4–11	Thailand; W 13–4	Hong Kong; W 22–2	Indonesia; W 19–6	Japan; W 12–11	2	—N/a			2nd place, silver medalist(s)

=== Men's tournament ===
Team roster

Head coach: (Serbia) Nemanja Knežević

1. Pavel Lipilin (GK)
2. Yevgeniy Medvedev (D)
3. Ruslan Akhmetov (D)
4. Roman Pilipenko (CB)
5. Miras Aubakirov (D)
6. Alexey Shmider (D)
7. Murat Shakenov (D)
8. Altay Altayev (CF)
9. Rustam Ukumanov (D) (C)
10. Mikhail Ruday (CF)
11. Ravil Manafov (CF)
12. Yulian Verdesh (CB)
13. Valeriy Shlemov (GK)

Group A

Pos	Team	Pld	W	D	L	GF	GA	GD	Pts	Qualification
1	Kazakhstan	3	3	0	0	40	18	+22	6	Quarterfinals
2	Iran	3	2	0	1	32	25	+7	4	Quarterfinals
3	South Korea	3	1	0	2	30	39	−9	2	Quarterfinals
4	Singapore	3	0	0	3	16	36	−20	0	Quarterfinals

Source: OCA

25 August; 9:00	South Korea	9–16	Kazakhstan	Gelora Bung Karno Aquatic Stadium, Jakarta; Referees: Ni (CHN), Tahara (JPN)
25 August; 9:00	Score by quarters: 1–5, 1–5, 3–3, 4–3			Gelora Bung Karno Aquatic Stadium, Jakarta; Referees: Ni (CHN), Tahara (JPN)
25 August; 9:00	Kim D. 3	Goals	Ruday 3	Gelora Bung Karno Aquatic Stadium, Jakarta; Referees: Ni (CHN), Tahara (JPN)

27 August; 14:30	Kazakhstan	15–4	Singapore	Gelora Bung Karno Aquatic Stadium, Jakarta; Referees: Ni (CHN), Safabakhsh (IRI)
27 August; 14:30	Score by quarters: 4–0, 5–1, 4–2, 2–1			Gelora Bung Karno Aquatic Stadium, Jakarta; Referees: Ni (CHN), Safabakhsh (IRI)
27 August; 14:30	Ukumanov 5	Goals	four players 1	Gelora Bung Karno Aquatic Stadium, Jakarta; Referees: Ni (CHN), Safabakhsh (IRI)

28 August; 17:10	Kazakhstan	9–5	Iran	Gelora Bung Karno Aquatic Stadium, Jakarta; Referees: Štampalija (CRO), Stavridis (GRE)
28 August; 17:10	Score by quarters: 2–1, 2–1, 3–2, 2–1			Gelora Bung Karno Aquatic Stadium, Jakarta; Referees: Štampalija (CRO), Stavridis (GRE)
28 August; 17:10	Ukumanov 3	Goals	Pirouzkhah 2	Gelora Bung Karno Aquatic Stadium, Jakarta; Referees: Štampalija (CRO), Stavridis (GRE)

Quarter-final

30 August; 16:30	Kazakhstan	20–4	Indonesia	Gelora Bung Karno Aquatic Stadium, Jakarta; Referees: Tan (SGP), Tahara (JPN)
30 August; 16:30	Score by quarters: 4–3, 5–0, 6–1, 5–0			Gelora Bung Karno Aquatic Stadium, Jakarta; Referees: Tan (SGP), Tahara (JPN)
30 August; 16:30	Altayev 5	Goals	four players 1	Gelora Bung Karno Aquatic Stadium, Jakarta; Referees: Tan (SGP), Tahara (JPN)

Semifinal

31 August; 17:20	China	8–9	Kazakhstan	Gelora Bung Karno Aquatic Stadium, Jakarta; Referees: Štampalija (CRO), Alexandrescu (ROU)
31 August; 17:20	Score by quarters: 1–3, 3–1, 2–4, 2–1			Gelora Bung Karno Aquatic Stadium, Jakarta; Referees: Štampalija (CRO), Alexandrescu (ROU)
31 August; 17:20	Chen Z. 3	Goals	Shmider 3	Gelora Bung Karno Aquatic Stadium, Jakarta; Referees: Štampalija (CRO), Alexandrescu (ROU)

Gold medal game

1 September; 17:20	Japan	7–8	Kazakhstan	Gelora Bung Karno Aquatic Stadium, Jakarta; Referees: Štampalija (CRO), Flahive (AUS)
1 September; 17:20	Score by quarters: 3–2, 2–0, 2–3, 0–3			Gelora Bung Karno Aquatic Stadium, Jakarta; Referees: Štampalija (CRO), Flahive (AUS)
1 September; 17:20	Adachi 3	Goals	Ruday 3	Gelora Bung Karno Aquatic Stadium, Jakarta; Referees: Štampalija (CRO), Flahive (AUS)

=== Women's tournament ===
Team roster

Head coach: Marat Naurazbekov

1. Alexandra Zharkimbayeva (GK) (C)
2. Oxana Saichuk (D)
3. Aizhan Akilbayeva (D)
4. Anna Turova (CB)
5. Anastassiya Yeremina (CB)
6. Darya Roga (D)
7. Anna Novikova (D)
8. Sivilya Raiter (CF)
9. Shakhzoda Mansurova (D)
10. Zamira Myrzabekova (CF)
11. Anastassiya Mirshina (D)
12. Anastassiya Murataliyeva (D)
13. Azhar Alibayeva (GK)

Round robin

Pos	Team	Pld	W	D	L	GF	GA	GD	Pts
1	China	5	5	0	0	76	24	+52	10
2	Kazakhstan	5	4	0	1	70	34	+36	8
3	Japan	5	3	0	2	84	36	+48	6
4	Thailand	5	2	0	3	53	62	−9	4
5	Indonesia	5	1	0	4	30	82	−52	2
6	Hong Kong	5	0	0	5	22	97	−75	0

Source: OCA

16 August; 17:10	China	11–4	Kazakhstan	Gelora Bung Karno Aquatic Stadium, Jakarta; Referees: Stavridis (GRE), Štampalija (CRO)
16 August; 17:10	Score by quarters: 3–1, 4–1, 2–1, 2–1			Gelora Bung Karno Aquatic Stadium, Jakarta; Referees: Stavridis (GRE), Štampalija (CRO)
16 August; 17:10	Xiong, Zhang J. 2	Goals	Roga 2	Gelora Bung Karno Aquatic Stadium, Jakarta; Referees: Stavridis (GRE), Štampalija (CRO)

17 August; 15:50	Kazakhstan	13–4	Thailand	Gelora Bung Karno Aquatic Stadium, Jakarta; Referees: Tan (SGP), Štampalija (CRO)
17 August; 15:50	Score by quarters: 3–3, 2–1, 6–0, 2–0			Gelora Bung Karno Aquatic Stadium, Jakarta; Referees: Tan (SGP), Štampalija (CRO)
17 August; 15:50	Mirshina 5	Goals	four players 1	Gelora Bung Karno Aquatic Stadium, Jakarta; Referees: Tan (SGP), Štampalija (CRO)

19 August; 14:30	Hong Kong	2–22	Kazakhstan	Gelora Bung Karno Aquatic Stadium, Jakarta; Referees: Pranolo (INA), Tan (SGP)
19 August; 14:30	Score by quarters: 0–7, 1–3, 1–7, 0–5			Gelora Bung Karno Aquatic Stadium, Jakarta; Referees: Pranolo (INA), Tan (SGP)
19 August; 14:30	Chan, Leung 1	Goals	Novikova, Myrzabekova 4	Gelora Bung Karno Aquatic Stadium, Jakarta; Referees: Pranolo (INA), Tan (SGP)

20 August; 14:30	Indonesia	6–19	Kazakhstan	Gelora Bung Karno Aquatic Stadium, Jakarta; Referees: Tahara (JPN), Ni (CHN)
20 August; 14:30	Score by quarters: 0–5, 0–2, 2–7, 4–5			Gelora Bung Karno Aquatic Stadium, Jakarta; Referees: Tahara (JPN), Ni (CHN)
20 August; 14:30	Manzilina 2	Goals	Mirshina 5	Gelora Bung Karno Aquatic Stadium, Jakarta; Referees: Tahara (JPN), Ni (CHN)

21 August; 17:10	Kazakhstan	12–11	Japan	Gelora Bung Karno Aquatic Stadium, Jakarta; Referees: Stavridis (GRE), Štampalija (CRO)
21 August; 17:10	Score by quarters: 1–0, 3–3, 4–5, 4–3			Gelora Bung Karno Aquatic Stadium, Jakarta; Referees: Stavridis (GRE), Štampalija (CRO)
21 August; 17:10	Myrzabekova 6	Goals	Magariyama, Hashida 3	Gelora Bung Karno Aquatic Stadium, Jakarta; Referees: Stavridis (GRE), Štampalija (CRO)

== Wrestling ==
Key:

- F – Victory by fall.
- PP – Decision by points – the loser with technical points.
- PO – Decision by points – the loser without technical points.
- ST – Great superiority – the loser without technical points and a margin of victory of at least 8 (Greco-Roman) or 10 (freestyle) points.

Men's freestyle

Athlete	Event	Qualification	Round of 16	Quarterfinal	Semifinal	Repechage 1	Repechage 2	Final / BM	
Athlete	Event	Opposition Result	Opposition Result	Opposition Result	Opposition Result	Opposition Result	Opposition Result	Opposition Result	Rank
Zhandos Ismailov	−57 kg	Bye	H Abdullah (AFG); W 10–0	Kang K-s (PRK); L 1–3	Did not advance	Bye	Y Takahashi (JPN); L 4–7	Did not advance	8
Sayatbek Okassov	−65 kg	M Jouda (PLE); W 11–0	Lee S-c (KOR); W 9^{F}–0	Y Katai (CHN); W 9–5	D Takatani (JPN); L 4–4 ^{PP}	Bye		B Borjakow (TKM); W 5–2	3rd place, bronze medalist(s)
Daniyar Kaisanov	−74 kg	Bye	A Ibrahim (QAT); W 10–0	Cấn T D (VIE); W 10–0	Gong B-m (KOR); W 12–8	Bye		Abdurakhmonov (UZB); L 2–3	2nd place, silver medalist(s)
Adilet Davlumbayev	−86 kg	Bye	B Kadirov (TJK); W 8–0	A F Faqiri (AFG); W 3^{F}–0	Abounader (LBN); L 9–10	Bye		Gamidgadzhiev (KGZ); W 3–0	3rd place, bronze medalist(s)
Bakdaulet Almentay	−97 kg	—N/a	Ö Batzul (MGL); L 4–5	Did not advance			—N/a	Did not advance	9
Oleg Boltin	−125 kg	—N/a	N Arakida (JPN); W 1–0	P Hadi (IRI); L 0–10	Did not advance	S Malik (IND); L 0–7	—N/a	Did not advance	8

Men's Greco-Roman

Athlete	Event	Round of 16	Quarterfinal	Semifinal	Repechage	Final / BM	
Athlete	Event	Opposition Result	Opposition Result	Opposition Result	Opposition Result	Opposition Result	Rank
Mirambek Ainagulov	−60 kg	Bye	Đới Đ T (VIE); W 9–0	Zholchubekov (KGZ); L 0–9	Bye	Ri S-u (PRK); W 13–5	3rd place, bronze medalist(s)
Almat Kebispayev	−67 kg	Hung Y-h (TPE); W 7–2	M Kundu (IND); W 8–0	Geraei (IRI); W 10–0	Bye	Ryu H-s (KOR); L 4–5	2nd place, silver medalist(s)
Askhat Dilmukhamedov	−77 kg	J Manatad (PHI); W 8–0	S Yabiku (JPN); L 3–3 ^{PP}	Did not advance			10
Azamat Kustubayev	−87 kg	Assakalov (UZB); L 1–2	Did not advance		S Shirdakov (KGZ); W 3–1	G Singh (IND); W 6–3	3rd place, bronze medalist(s)
Yerulan Iskakov	−97 kg	Bye	Cho H-c (KOR); L 1–6	Did not advance	Bye	A Heidari (IRI); W 10–0	3rd place, bronze medalist(s)
Nurmakhan Tinaliyev	−130 kg	Bye	P Ramadhani (INA); W 8–0	Sonoda (JPN); W 6–0	Bye	Abdullaev (UZB); L 0–8	2nd place, silver medalist(s)

Women's freestyle

Athlete	Event	Round of 16	Quarterfinal	Semifinal	Repechage	Final / BM	
Athlete	Event	Opposition Result	Opposition Result	Opposition Result	Opposition Result	Opposition Result	Rank
Zhuldyz Eshimova	−53 kg	Lee S-h (KOR); W 11–6	J Virangsa (THA); W 10–0	E Sumiyaa (MGL); W 12–11	Bye	Pak Y-m (PRK); L 0–11	2nd place, silver medalist(s)
Emma Tissina	−57 kg	D Srors (CAM); W 4^{F}–0	Jong M-s (PRK); L 0–10	Did not advance	Sakagami (JPN); L 0–11	Did not advance	8
Ayaulym Kassymova	−62 kg	D Atiya (INA); W 10–0	S Malik (IND); L 0–10	Did not advance			7
Zhamila Bakbergenova	−68 kg	A Gempei (JPN); L 2–5	Did not advance				9
Elmira Syzdykova	−76 kg	Bye	Zhou Q (CHN); L 0–10^{F}	Did not advance	—N/a	Hwang E-j (KOR); W 5–2	3rd place, bronze medalist(s)

== Wushu ==
Taolu

Athlete	Event	Event 1		Event 2		Total	Rank
Athlete	Event	Result	Rank	Result	Rank	Total	Rank
Arstan Urazov	Men's changquan	9.36	11	—N/a		9.36	11
Gali Dauletzhan	Men's nanquan and nangun	9.02	18	9.10	19	18.12	18
Askarbay Yedilbaev	Men's taijiquan and taijijian	DNS	—	DNS	—	—	
Dayana Utyamysheva	Women's nanquan and nandao	7.85	12	7.16	12	15.01	12
Anel Sanatkyzy	Women's taijiquan and taijijian	7.85	15	7.99	15	15.84	15

Sanda

Athlete	Event	Round of 32	Round of 16	Quarterfinal	Semifinal	Final	
Athlete	Event	Opposition Score	Opposition Score	Opposition Score	Opposition Score	Opposition Score	Rank
Sukhrab Ashimzhanov	Men's –56 kg	Bùi T G (VIE); L 0–2	Did not advance				
Almas Duiseyev	Men's –60 kg	Chit K K (MYA); W 2–1	R Ibragimov (KGZ); L 0–2	Did not advance			
Amir Ismailov	Men's –70 kg	—N/a	M Mohammadseifi (IRI); L 0–2	Did not advance			

Key: * TV – Technical victory.

== See also ==
- Kazakhstan at the 2018 Asian Para Games
