= Sambo at the 2018 Asian Games – Women's 48 kg =

Sambo competitions

Women's 48 kg at the 2018 Asian Games
- Venue: Jakarta Convention Center
- Date: 31 August 2018
- Competitors: 13 from 8 nations

Medalists
gold medal	Ganbaataryn Narantsetseg	Mongolia
silver medal	Baasansürengiin Oidovchimed	Mongolia
bronze medal	Nodira Gulova	Uzbekistan
bronze medal	Aizhan Zhylkybayeva	Kazakhstan

The women's sport sambo 48 kilograms competition at the 2018 Asian Games in Jakarta was held on 31 August 2018 at the Jakarta Convention Center Assembly Hall.

== Schedule ==
All times are Western Indonesia Time (UTC+07:00)

Date	Time	Event
Friday, 31 August 2018	15:00	Round of 16
Friday, 31 August 2018	15:00	Quarterfinals
Friday, 31 August 2018	15:00	Repechages
Friday, 31 August 2018	15:00	Semifinals
Friday, 31 August 2018	18:30	Finals

== Results ==
Legend

- SU — Won by submission
- TT — Won by total throw

=== Main bracket ===
Round of 16
Nodira Gulova (UZB)	4^{TT}
Cấn Thị Hồng (VIE)	0
Nazgul Yelmuratova (KAZ)	0
Baasansürengiin Oidovchimed (MGL)	5
Aziza Nazarowa (TKM)	0
Anara Zhumali Kyzy (KGZ)	1
Ganbaataryn Narantsetseg (MGL)	5^{SU}
Anggun Nurajijah (INA)	0
Madina Turgunbaeva (UZB)	4^{SU}
Aýna Zaripowa (TKM)	0

Quarterfinals
Nodira Gulova (UZB)	2
Baasansürengiin Oidovchimed (MGL)	2
Anara Zhumali Kyzy (KGZ)	1
Maria Magdalena Ince (INA)	6
Ganbaataryn Narantsetseg (MGL)	5^{SU}
Aizhan Zhylkybayeva (KAZ)	0
Madina Turgunbaeva (UZB)	1^{SU}
Elham Bahrami (IRI)	0

Semifinals
Baasansürengiin Oidovchimed (MGL)	10
Maria Magdalena Ince (INA)	0
Ganbaataryn Narantsetseg (MGL)	5^{SU}
Madina Turgunbaeva (UZB)	0

Final
Baasansürengiin Oidovchimed (MGL)	0
Ganbaataryn Narantsetseg (MGL)	6

=== Repechage ===
Repechage round 1
Nazgul Yelmuratova (KAZ)	2
Nodira Gulova (UZB)	2
Anggun Nurajijah (INA)	2
Aizhan Zhylkybayeva (KAZ)	8
Aýna Zaripowa (TKM)	1
Elham Bahrami (IRI)	0

Final of repechage
Nodira Gulova (UZB)	4
Anara Zhumali Kyzy (KGZ)	0
Aizhan Zhylkybayeva (KAZ)	2
Aýna Zaripowa (TKM)	0

Bronze medals
Nodira Gulova (UZB)	5
Madina Turgunbaeva (UZB)	0
Aizhan Zhylkybayeva (KAZ)	7^{SU}
Maria Magdalena Ince (INA)	1
