= Shooting at the 2018 Asian Games – Women's double trap =

Women's double trap at the 2018 Asian Games
- Venue: Jakabaring Shooting Range
- Dates: 23 August 2018
- Competitors: 15 from 8 nations

Medalists
gold medal	Li Qingnian	China
silver medal	Bai Yiting	China
bronze medal	Mariya Dmitriyenko	Kazakhstan

The women's double trap event at the 2018 Asian Games in Palembang, Indonesia took place on 23 August at the Jakabaring International Shooting Range.

== Schedule ==
All times are Western Indonesia Time (UTC+07:00)

Date	Time	Event
Thursday, 23 August 2018	10:45	Final

== Records ==
Prior to this competition, the existing world, Asian and Games records were as follows.

World Record	Claudia De Luca (ITA)	131	Leobersdorf, Austria	6 August 2018
Asian Record	—	—	—	—
Games Record	—	—	—	—

== Results ==
Rank	Athlete	Round					Total	S-off	Notes
Rank	Athlete	1	2	3	4	5	Total	S-off	Notes
1st place, gold medalist(s)	Li Qingnian (CHN)	27	26	27	27	29	136		WR
2nd place, silver medalist(s)	Bai Yiting (CHN)	27	26	29	24	28	134		
3rd place, bronze medalist(s)	Mariya Dmitriyenko (KAZ)	24	26	26	23	26	125		
4	Lee Bo-na (KOR)	24	25	26	25	24	124		
5	Kang Gee-eun (KOR)	23	23	23	26	26	121		
6	Shreyasi Singh (IND)	23	22	26	25	25	121		
7	Varsha Varman (IND)	20	26	26	24	24	120		
8	Sylvia Silimang (INA)	25	18	26	25	20	114		
9	Anastassiya Davydova (KAZ)	22	24	25	20	21	112		
10	Chattaya Kitcharoen (THA)	24	18	23	22	21	108		
11	Kholoud Al-Khalaf (QAT)	21	23	20	22	20	106		
12	Amna Al-Abdulla (QAT)	18	21	17	20	26	102		
13	Shiva Farahpour (IRI)	19	19	19	18	19	94		
14	Napapha Pramuanchok (THA)	16	19	17	16	22	90		
15	Sarmunah (INA)	16	17	16	19	16	84		
