= Swimming at the 2018 Asian Games – Men's 100 metre breaststroke =

Men's 100 metre breaststroke at the 2018 Asian Games
- Venue: Gelora Bung Karno Aquatic Stadium
- Date: 22 August 2018
- Competitors: 32 from 21 nations

Medalists
gold medal	Yasuhiro Koseki	Japan
silver medal	Yan Zibei	China
bronze medal	Dmitriy Balandin	Kazakhstan

The men's 100 metre breaststroke event at the 2018 Asian Games took place on 22 August at the Gelora Bung Karno Aquatic Stadium.

== Schedule ==
All times are Western Indonesia Time (UTC+07:00)

Date	Time	Event
Wednesday, 22 August 2018	09:25	Heats
Wednesday, 22 August 2018	18:23	Final

== Records ==
Prior to this competition, the existing world, Asian and Games records were as follows.

World Record	Adam Peaty (GBR)	57.10	Glasgow, United Kingdom	4 August 2018
Asian Record	Yasuhiro Koseki (JPN)	58.78	Monte Carlo, Monaco	17 June 2018
Games Record	Dmitriy Balandin (KAZ)	59.92	Incheon, South Korea	24 September 2014

== Results ==
=== Heats ===
Rank	Heat	Athlete	Time	Notes
1	4	Yan Zibei (CHN)	59.91	GR
2	4	Dmitriy Balandin (KAZ)	1:00.07	
3	3	Qin Haiyang (CHN)	1:00.78	
4	2	Ippei Watanabe (JPN)	1:00.93	
5	3	Vladislav Mustafin (UZB)	1:01.04	
6	2	Moon Jae-kwon (KOR)	1:01.17	
7	3	Yasuhiro Koseki (JPN)	1:01.35	
8	4	Lionel Khoo (SGP)	1:02.00	
9	4	Kim Jae-youn (KOR)	1:02.01	
10	1	Sandeep Sejwal (IND)	1:02.07	
11	2	Denis Petrashov (KGZ)	1:02.12	
12	3	Chao Man Hou (MAC)	1:02.23	
13	2	Gagarin Nathaniel (INA)	1:02.42	
14	2	Aibek Kamzenov (KAZ)	1:02.74	
15	3	Azad Al-Barazi (SYR)	1:03.01	
16	4	Christopher Cheong (SGP)	1:03.28	
17	3	Amro Al-Wir (JOR)	1:03.32	
18	3	Phạm Thanh Bảo (VIE)	1:03.47	
19	2	Boris Yang (HKG)	1:03.77	
20	4	Radomyos Matjiur (THA)	1:04.11	
21	4	Ng Yan Kin (HKG)	1:04.21	
22	2	Nuttapong Ketin (THA)	1:04.50	
23	4	Indra Gunawan (INA)	1:05.36	
24	3	Chou Kit (MAC)	1:05.92	
25	2	Günsennorovyn Zandanbal (MGL)	1:07.94	
26	1	Batyr Täçmyradow (TKM)	1:08.28	
27	1	Shuvam Shrestha (NEP)	1:11.37	
28	1	Youssef Hesham Mohamed (QAT)	1:11.47	
29	1	Batmönkhiin Jürmed (MGL)	1:12.95	
30	1	Muhammad Hamza Malik (PAK)	1:13.33	
31	1	Hassan Ashraf (MDV)	1:22.12	
32	1	Hussain Haish Hassan (MDV)	1:22.34	

=== Final ===
Rank	Athlete	Time	Notes
1st place, gold medalist(s)	Yasuhiro Koseki (JPN)	58.86	GR
2nd place, silver medalist(s)	Yan Zibei (CHN)	59.31	
3rd place, bronze medalist(s)	Dmitriy Balandin (KAZ)	59.39	
4	Ippei Watanabe (JPN)	1:00.15	
5	Qin Haiyang (CHN)	1:00.24	
6	Moon Jae-kwon (KOR)	1:01.07	
7	Vladislav Mustafin (UZB)	1:01.49	
8	Lionel Khoo (SGP)	1:01.74	
