= Swimming at the 2018 Asian Games – Men's 50 metre breaststroke =

Men's 50 metre breaststroke at the 2018 Asian Games
- Venue: Gelora Bung Karno Aquatic Stadium
- Date: 24 August 2018
- Competitors: 36 from 25 nations

Medalists
gold medal	Yasuhiro Koseki	Japan
silver medal	Yan Zibei	China
bronze medal	Dmitriy Balandin	Kazakhstan

The men's 50 metre breaststroke event at the 2018 Asian Games took place on 24 August at the Gelora Bung Karno Aquatic Stadium.

== Schedule ==
All times are Western Indonesia Time (UTC+07:00)

Date	Time	Event
Friday, 24 August 2018	09:08	Heats
Friday, 24 August 2018	18:06	Final

== Records ==
Prior to this competition, the existing world, Asian and Games records were as follows.

World Record	Adam Peaty (GBR)	25.95	Budapest, Hungary	25 July 2017
Asian Record	Yasuhiro Koseki (JPN)	26.94	Monte Carlo, Monaco	17 June 2018
Games Record	Yasuhiro Koseki (JPN)	27.33	Jakarta, Indonesia	22 August 2018

== Results ==
=== Heats ===
Rank	Heat	Athlete	Time	Notes
1	4	Yan Zibei (CHN)	27.06	GR
2	5	Yasuhiro Koseki (JPN)	27.28	
3	5	Vladislav Mustafin (UZB)	27.41	
4	4	Sun Jiajun (CHN)	27.48	
5	5	Dmitriy Balandin (KAZ)	27.53	
6	1	Sandeep Sejwal (IND)	27.95	
7	4	Daiya Seto (JPN)	27.97	
7	5	Chao Man Hou (MAC)	27.97	
9	3	Lionel Khoo (SGP)	28.19	
10	3	Kim Jae-youn (KOR)	28.24	
11	3	Moon Jae-kwon (KOR)	28.26	
12	5	Aibek Kamzenov (KAZ)	28.29	
13	4	Gagarin Nathaniel (INA)	28.32	
14	4	Wu Chun-feng (TPE)	28.42	
15	3	Azad Al-Barazi (SYR)	28.53	
16	3	Denis Petrashov (KGZ)	28.73	
17	4	Indra Gunawan (INA)	28.76	
18	4	Christopher Cheong (SGP)	29.09	
19	5	Ng Yan Kin (HKG)	29.28	
20	5	Mehdi Ansari (IRI)	29.35	
21	5	Foong Wei Tze (MAS)	29.51	
22	2	Amro Al-Wir (JOR)	29.58	
23	3	Chou Kit (MAC)	29.61	
24	3	Radomyos Matjiur (THA)	29.62	
25	4	Phạm Thanh Bảo (VIE)	29.75	
26	2	Günsennorovyn Zandanbal (MGL)	29.96	
27	2	Abdulaziz Al-Obaidly (QAT)	31.43	
28	2	Batyr Täçmyradow (TKM)	31.53	
29	3	Wong Chun Yan (HKG)	31.65	
30	2	Batmönkhiin Jürmed (MGL)	32.00	
31	2	Youssef Hesham Mohamed (QAT)	32.23	
32	2	Shuvam Shrestha (NEP)	32.45	
33	2	Muhammad Hamza Malik (PAK)	33.20	
34	1	Ramziyor Khorkashov (TJK)	35.21	
35	1	Hussain Haish Hassan (MDV)	35.85	
36	1	Hassan Ashraf (MDV)	36.32	

=== Final ===
Rank	Athlete	Time	Notes
1st place, gold medalist(s)	Yasuhiro Koseki (JPN)	27.07	
2nd place, silver medalist(s)	Yan Zibei (CHN)	27.25	
3rd place, bronze medalist(s)	Dmitriy Balandin (KAZ)	27.46	
4	Sun Jiajun (CHN)	27.65	
5	Vladislav Mustafin (UZB)	27.72	
6	Chao Man Hou (MAC)	27.91	
7	Sandeep Sejwal (IND)	27.98	
8	Daiya Seto (JPN)	28.00	
