= Swimming at the 2022 Asian Games – Men's 100 metre breaststroke =

Men's 100 metre breaststroke at the 2022 Asian Games
- Venue: Hangzhou Olympic Expo Aquatics Center
- Date: 25 September 2023
- Competitors: 28 from 20 nations

Medalists
gold medal	Qin Haiyang	China
silver medal	Yan Zibei	China
bronze medal	Choi Dong-yeol	South Korea

The men's 100 metre breaststroke event at the 2022 Asian Games took place on 25 September 2023 at the Hangzhou Olympic Expo Center.

== Schedule ==
All times are China Standard Time (UTC+08:00)

Date	Time	Event
Monday, 25 September 2023	10:50	Heats
Monday, 25 September 2023	20:13	Final

== Records ==
Prior to this competition, the existing world, Asian and Games records were as follows.

World Record	Adam Peaty (GBR)	56.88	Gwangju, South Korea	21 July 2019
Asian Record	Qin Haiyang (CHN)	57.69	Fukuoka, Japan	24 July 2023
Games Record	Yasuhiro Koseki (JPN)	58.86	Jakarta, Indonesia	22 August 2018

== Results ==
=== Heats ===
Rank	Heat	Athlete	Time	Notes
1	4	Qin Haiyang (CHN)	58.35	GR
2	4	Choi Dong-yeol (KOR)	59.90	
3	4	Chao Man Hou (MAC)	1:01.31	
4	2	Ippei Watanabe (JPN)	1:01.48	
5	3	Yan Zibei (CHN)	1:01.49	
6	3	Cho Sung-jae (KOR)	1:01.68	
7	3	Maximillian Ang (SGP)	1:01.91	
8	3	Likith Prema (IND)	1:01.98	
9	2	Shoma Sato (JPN)	1:02.00	
10	2	Arsen Kozhakhmetov (KAZ)	1:02.06	
11	4	Phạm Thanh Bảo (VIE)	1:02.40	
12	3	Benson Wong (HKG)	1:02.48	
13	2	Muhammad Dwiky Raharjo (INA)	1:02.60	
14	4	Adam Chillingworth (HKG)	1:02.66	
15	2	Cai Bing-rong (TPE)	1:02.84	
16	2	Hii Puong Wei (MAS)	1:03.21	
17	3	Thanonchai Janruksa (THA)	1:04.41	
18	3	Choi Ngou Fai (MAC)	1:04.73	
19	4	Dulyawat Kaewsriyong (THA)	1:04.86	
20	4	Behruz Akhtamov (UZB)	1:06.28	
21	3	Ganzorigtyn Sugar (MGL)	1:08.16	
22	2	Omar Al-Hammadi (UAE)	1:09.36	
23	1	Tsevegsürengiin Günbileg (MGL)	1:10.99	
24	2	Fahim Anwari (AFG)	1:11.13	
25	4	Hamza Shalan (QAT)	1:11.23	
26	1	Mubal Azzam Ibrahim (MDV)	1:14.73	
27	1	Muhammad Hamza Anwar (PAK)	1:20.11	
28	1	Ahmed Neeq Niyaz (MDV)	1:21.20	

=== Final ===
Rank	Athlete	Time	Notes
1st place, gold medalist(s)	Qin Haiyang (CHN)	57.76	GR
2nd place, silver medalist(s)	Yan Zibei (CHN)	59.09	
3rd place, bronze medalist(s)	Choi Dong-yeol (KOR)	59.28	
4	Cho Sung-jae (KOR)	1:00.88	
5	Ippei Watanabe (JPN)	1:01.36	
6	Chao Man Hou (MAC)	1:01.53	
7	Likith Prema (IND)	1:01.62	
8	Maximillian Ang (SGP)	1:02.22	
