= Yan Zibei =

Chinese swimmer (born 1995)

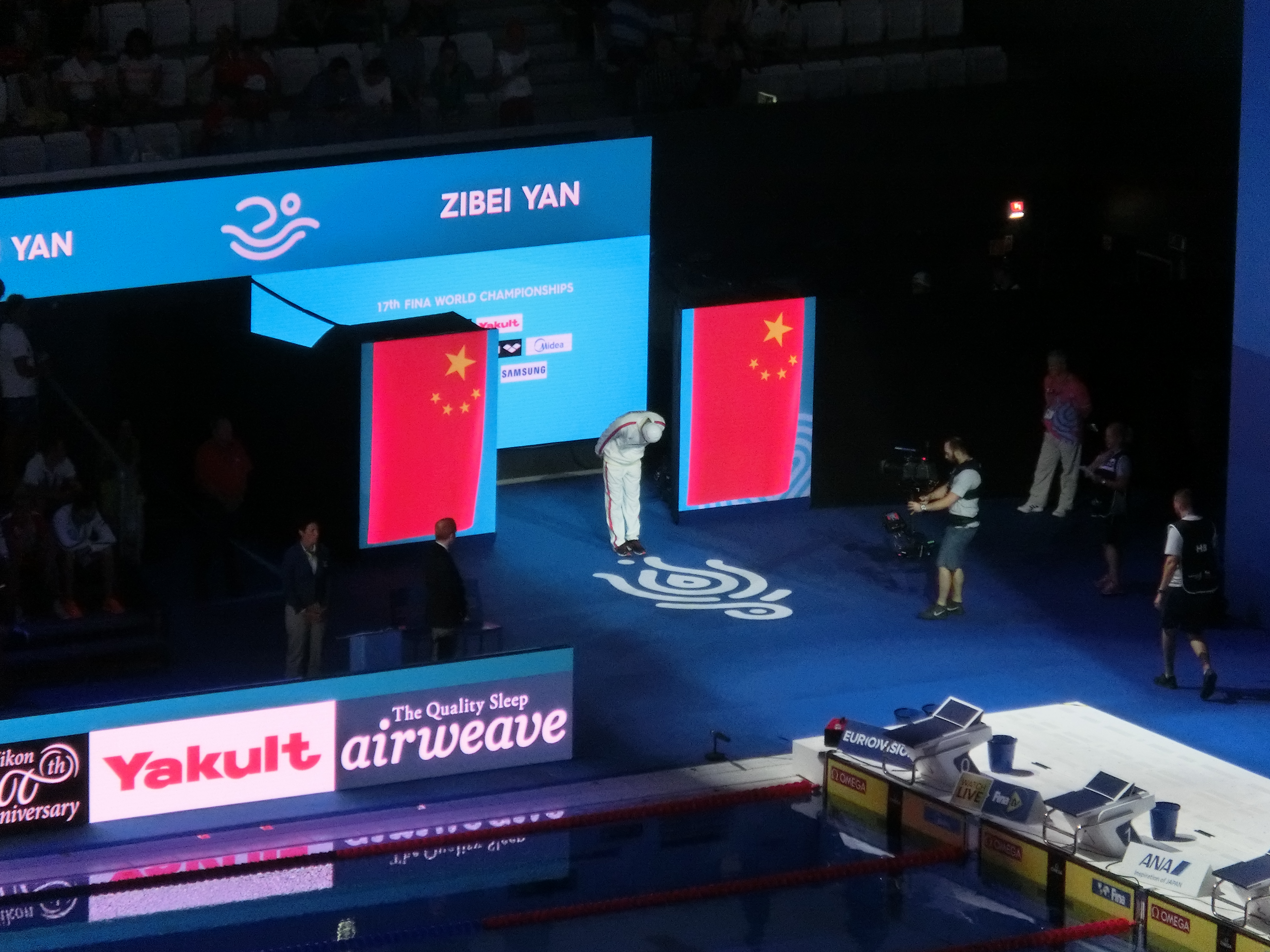
- FINA World Championships, Budapest, 2017-07-25, 50m breaststroke semifinal, Zibei Yan (China)

Personal information
- Native name: 闫子贝
- Born: 12 October 1995 (age 30) Xiangfan, China
- Height: 1.87 m (6 ft 2 in)
- Weight: 78 kg (172 lb)

Sport
- Country: China
- Sport: Swimming
- Strokes: Breaststroke
- Club: Hubei
Medal record
Men's swimming
Representing China
Olympic Games
Silver medal – second place	2020 Tokyo	4×100 m mixed medley
World Championships (LC)
Gold medal – first place	2023 Fukuoka	4×100 m mixed medley
Silver medal – second place	2023 Fukuoka	4×100 m medley
Bronze medal – third place	2017 Budapest	4×100 m mixed medley
Bronze medal – third place	2019 Gwangju	100 m breaststroke
Asian Games
Gold medal – first place	2018 Jakarta	4×100 m medley
Gold medal – first place	2018 Jakarta	4×100 m mixed medley
Gold medal – first place	2022 Hangzhou	4×100 m medley
Gold medal – first place	2022 Hangzhou	mixed 4×100 m medley
Silver medal – second place	2018 Jakarta	50 m breaststroke
Silver medal – second place	2018 Jakarta	100 m breaststroke
Silver medal – second place	2022 Hangzhou	100 m breastroke
Military World Games
Gold medal – first place	2019 Wuhan	4×100 m mixed medley
Silver medal – second place	2019 Wuhan	50 m breaststroke
Silver medal – second place	2019 Wuhan	100 m breaststroke
Silver medal – second place	2019 Wuhan	4×100 m medley

Yan Zibei (Chinese: 闫子贝, born 12 October 1995) is a retired Chinese swimmer. He competed in the men's 100 metre breaststroke event at the 2016 Summer Olympics. He won a silver medal when he competed in the 4 × 100 m mixed medley relay at the 2020 Summer Olympics. Yan is a former national record and Asian record holder in the 50m and 100m breaststroke.

== Personal bests ==
As of 30 July 2021

=== Long course (50-meter pool) ===
Event	Time	Meet	Date	Note(s)
50 m breaststroke	26.86	2019 World Championships	23 July 2019 (semifinals); 24 July 2019	NR AS
100 m breaststroke	58.63	2019 World Championships	22 July 2019	NR AS
200 m breaststroke	2.08.75	2017 Chinese City Games	1 September 2017	

=== Short course (25-meter pool) ===
Event	Time	Meet	Date	Note(s)
50 m breaststroke	26.22	2018 World Championships	15 December 2018	
100 m breaststroke	56.34	2018 World Cup	15 November 2018	
200 m breaststroke	2.04.52	2017 World Cup	10 November 2017	

Key: NR = National Record; AS = Asian Record
