= Kurash at the 2018 Asian Games – Women's 52 kg =

Women's 52 kg at the 2018 Asian Games
- Venue: Jakarta Convention Center
- Dates: 28 August 2018
- Competitors: 21 from 12 nations

Medalists
gold medal	Gulnor Sulaymanova	Uzbekistan
silver medal	Pincky Balhara	India
bronze medal	Oysuluv Abdumajidova	Uzbekistan
bronze medal	Malaprabha Jadhav	India

The women's Kurash 52 kilograms competition at the 2018 Asian Games in Jakarta, Indonesia was held on 28 August at the JCC Assembly Hall.

Kurash is a traditional martial art from Uzbekistan that resembles wrestling. There are three assessment system in Kurash, namely Halal, Yambosh, and Chala. Halal is if an athlete Kurash is able to slam his opponent in the back. Yambosh is the imperfect of Halal, two Yambosh same as Halal.

Gulnor Sulaymanova from Uzbekistan won the gold medal after beating Pincky Balhara of India in gold medal bout.

== Schedule ==
All times are Western Indonesia Time (UTC+07:00)

Date	Time	Event
Tuesday, 28 August 2018	14:00	Round of 32
Tuesday, 28 August 2018	14:00	Round of 16
Tuesday, 28 August 2018	14:00	Quarterfinals
Tuesday, 28 August 2018	18:00	Semifinals
Tuesday, 28 August 2018	18:00	Final

== Results ==
=== Final ===
Final
Pincky Balhara (IND)	000
Gulnor Sulaymanova (UZB)	100

=== Top half ===
Round of 32
Bhagawati Majhi (NEP)	000
Tsou Chia-wen (TPE)	100
Tri Kusumawardani Susanti (INA)	012
Nguyễn Ngọc Ngân (VIE)	000
Erdenedalain Nürzedmaa (MGL)	000
Anastasiýa Makeýewa (TKM)	110

Round of 16
Tsou Chia-wen (TPE)	000
Pincky Balhara (IND)	011
Tri Kusumawardani Susanti (INA)	011
Grace Loberanes (PHI)	000
Anastasiýa Makeýewa (TKM)	001
Oysuluv Abdumajidova (UZB)	011
Tahereh Azarpeivand (IRI)	010
Botagoz Dyussembayeva (KAZ)	002

Quarterfinals
Pincky Balhara (IND)	001
Tri Kusumawardani Susanti (INA)	000
Oysuluv Abdumajidova (UZB)	011
Tahereh Azarpeivand (IRI)	002

Semifinals
Pincky Balhara (IND)	001
Oysuluv Abdumajidova (UZB)	000

=== Bottom half ===
Round of 32
Helen Dawa (PHI)	000
Malaprabha Jadhav (IND)	001
Gulnor Sulaymanova (UZB)	100
Heka Maya Sari Sembiring (INA)	000

Round of 16
Malaprabha Jadhav (IND)	002
Zarina Saparowa (TKM)	002
Nichakan Seesai (THA)	000
Văn Ngọc Tú (VIE)	100
Gulnor Sulaymanova (UZB)	101
Akhzhol Kaiypkan (KAZ)	000
Yen Li-an (TPE)	001
Erdenetsogtyn Gerelmaa (MGL)	100

Quarterfinals
Malaprabha Jadhav (IND)	002
Văn Ngọc Tú (VIE)	001
Gulnor Sulaymanova (UZB)	102
Erdenetsogtyn Gerelmaa (MGL)	000

Semifinals
Malaprabha Jadhav (IND)	000
Gulnor Sulaymanova (UZB)	100
