= Malaprabha Jadhav =

Indian Kurash wrestler and a Judo Player (born 1998)

Personal information
- Nationality: Indian
- Born: 1 December 1998 (age 27)
- Height: 147 cm (4 ft 10 in)
- Weight: 50 kg (110 lb)

Sport
- Country: India
- Sport: Kurash and Judo
- Coached by: Mrs. Triveni Jitendra Singh and Mr. Jitendra Singh
Medal record
Women's Kurash
Representing India
Asian Indoor and Martial Arts Games
Silver medal – second place	2017 Ashgabat	48kg
Asian Games
Bronze medal – third place	2018 Jakarta	52 kg
- Updated on 28 August 2018

Malaprabha Jadhav (born 1 December 1998) is an Indian Kurash wrestler and a Judo Player. In 2018 Asian Games, at Jakarta in 52 kg she won a bronze medal.
