= Gulnor Sulaymanova =

Uzbekistani kurash practitioner

Personal information
- Nationality: Uzbekistani
- Born: 2 December 1990 (age 35)
- Height: 162 cm (5 ft 4 in)
- Weight: 52 kg (115 lb)

Sport
- Country: Uzbekistan
- Sport: kurash
Medal record
Representing Uzbekistan
Women's kurash
Asian Games
| Gold medal – first place | 2018 Jakarta | 52kg |
Kurash World Championship
| Gold medal – first place | 2017 Istanbul | 52kg |
Asian Indoor and Martial Arts Games
| Gold medal – first place | 2017 Ashgabat | 52kg |
Asian Kurash Championship
| Gold medal – first place | 2018 Pune | 52kg |

Gulnor Sulaymanova (born 2 December 1990) is an Uzbekistani female kurash practitioner. She is a gold medalist at the 2017 Kurash World Championship which was held in Istanbul.

She represented Uzbekistan at the 2018 Asian Games and claimed a gold medal in the women's individual 52kg event.
