= Nodira Gulova =

Uzbekistani judoka (born 1988)

Personal information
- Born: 22 June 1988 (age 38)
- Occupation: Judoka

Sport
- Country: Uzbekistan
- Sport: Judo
- Weight class: ‍–‍48 kg

Achievements and titles
- World Champ.: R64 (2015)
- Asian Champ.: R16 (2011, 2012, 2013, 2016)
Medal record
Women's judo
Representing Uzbekistan
IJF Grand Prix
Bronze medal – third place	2013 Tashkent	‍–‍48 kg
Bronze medal – third place	2016 Tashkent	‍–‍48 kg

Profile at external databases
- IJF: 7014
- JudoInside.com: 69071
- Updated on 8 December 2022

Nodira Gulova (born 22 June 1988) is an Uzbekistani judoka.

Gulova is a bronze medalist from the 2016 Judo Grand Prix Tashkent in the ‍–‍48 kg category.
