= South Korea at the 2018 Asian Games =

- IOC code: KOR
- NOC: Korean Olympic Committee
- Website: sports.or.kr

in Jakarta and Palembang August 18–September 2
- Competitors: 779 in 39 sports
- Flag bearer: Lim Yung-hui (opening)
- Medals Ranked 3rd: Gold 49 Silver 58 Bronze 71 Total 178

Asian Games appearances (overview)
- 1954; 1958; 1962; 1966; 1970; 1974; 1978; 1982; 1986; 1990; 1994; 1998; 2002; 2006; 2010; 2014; 2018; 2022; 2026

South Korea participated in the 2018 Asian Games in Jakarta and Palembang, Indonesia from 18 August to 2 September 2018. It was the 18th appearance of the country at the Asian Games, except the first edition in Delhi. As one of the best competitors at the Games, South Korea's best achievement was in the 2002 Busan, with the acquisition of 96 gold, 80 silver and 84 bronze medals. At the latest edition in 2014 Incheon, the country had collected 79 gold, 71 silver, and 84 bronze medals.

South Korea sent 779 athletes across 39 sports to compete in Jakarta and Palembang. Korean Sport & Olympic Committee (KOC) is aiming to finish second for the sixth consecutive Asian Games with 65 gold medals, fewer than the Incheon Asian Games four years ago. South Korea marched along with North Korea under the Korean Unification Flag at the opening ceremony, and have together fielded unified Korean teams in women's basketball, rowing and canoeing.

== Medalists ==
The following South Korean competitors won medals at the Games. In the by discipline sections below, medalists' names are bolded.

Medal	Name	Sport	Event	Date
Gold	Kang Min-sung	Taekwondo	Men's individual poomsae	19 August
Gold	Han Yeong-hun; Kang Wan-jin; Kim Seon-ho	Taekwondo	Men's team poomsae	19 August
Gold	Kim Tae-hun	Taekwondo	Men's 58 kg	20 August
Gold	Jeon Hee-sook	Fencing	Women's individual foil	20 August
Gold	Gu Bon-gil	Fencing	Men's individual sabre	20 August
Gold	Lee Da-bin	Taekwondo	Women's +67 kg	21 August
Gold	Ryu Han-su	Wrestling	Men's Greco-Roman 67 kg	21 August
Gold	Kang Young-mi	Fencing	Women's individual épée	21 August
Gold	Na Ah-reum	Cycling	Women's road race	22 August
Gold	Kim Ji-yeon; Hwang Seon-a; Yoon Ji-su; Choi Soo-yeon	Fencing	Women's team sabre	22 August
Gold	Cho Hyo-chul	Wrestling	Men's Greco-Roman 97 kg	22 August
Gold	Kim Jung-hwan; Oh Sang-uk; Gu Bon-gil; Kim Jun-ho	Fencing	Men's team sabre	23 August
Gold	Shin Hyun-woo	Shooting	Men's double trap	23 August
Gold	Kim Han-sol	Gymnastics	Men's floor	23 August
Gold	Yeo Seo-jeong	Gymnastics	Women's vault	23 August
Gold	Lee Dae-hoon	Taekwondo	Men's 68 kg	23 August
Gold	Choi Young-jeon	Shooting	Men's 300 metre standard rifle	24 August
Gold	Na Ah-reum	Cycling	Women's road time trial	24 August
Gold	Park Hyun-su	Rowing	Men's lightweight single sculls	24 August
Gold	Baek Seung-ja; Kim Hyun-mi; Ryu Seo-yeon; Han Byul; Lee Yeon-ji; Lee Na-young	Bowling	Women's team of six	24 August
Gold	Jeong You-jin	Shooting	Men's 10 m running target	24 August
Gold	Lee Kwang-hyun; Ha Tae-gyu; Son Young-ki; Heo Jun	Fencing	Men's team foil	24 August
Gold	Kim Seo-yeong	Swimming	Women's 200 m individual medley	24 August
Gold	Choi Bo-keum; Park Jong-woo; Koo Seong-hoi; Hong Hae-sol; Kim Jong-wook; Kang Hee-won	Bowling	Men's team of six	25 August
Gold	Sung Ki-ra	Ju-jitsu	Women's 62 kg	25 August
Gold	Chon Jong-won	Sport climbing	Men's combined	26 August
Gold	Jung Hye-lim	Athletics	Women's 100 m hurdles	26 August
Gold	Chang Hye-jin; Lee Eun-gyeong; Kang Chae-young	Archery	Women's team recurve	27 August
Gold	Kim Woo-jin	Archery	Men's individual recurve	28 August
Gold	Choi Bo-min; Song Yun-soo; So Chae-won	Archery	Women's team compound	28 August
Gold	Choi Yong-hee; Kim Jong-ho; Hong Sung-ho	Archery	Men's team compound	28 August
Gold	Kim You-ri; Lee Ju-mi; Kim Hyun-ji; Na Ah-reum	Cycling	Women's team pursuit	28 August
Gold	Kim Jin-woong	Soft tennis	Men's singles	29 August
Gold	Baek Jin-hee; Jang Woo-young; Lee Da-gyeom	Paragliding	Women's team cross-country	29 August
Gold	Jeong Bo-kyeong	Judo	Women's 48 kg	29 August
Gold	Park Sang-hoon	Cycling	Men's individual pursuit	29 August
Gold	An Ba-ul	Judo	Men's 66 kg	29 August
Gold	Lee Ju-mi	Cycling	Women's individual pursuit	30 August
Gold	Park Mi-ra; Choi Su-min; Song Hai-rim; Jung Ji-hae; Lee Hyo-jin; Jung Yu-ra; Kim Seon-hwa; Kang Eun-hye; Park Sae-young; Shin Eun-joo; Han Mi-seul; Kim On-a; Song Ji-eun; Yu So-jeong; Yoo Hyun-ji; Gim Bo-eun	Handball	Women's tournament	30 August
Gold	Na Ah-reum; Kim You-ri	Cycling	Women's madison	31 August
Gold	Ha Jee-min	Sailing	Men's laser	31 August
Gold	Gwak Dong-han	Judo	Men's 90 kg	31 August
Gold	Kim Sung-min	Judo	Men's +100 kg	31 August
Gold	Cho Gwang-hee	Canoeing	Men's K-1 200 m	1 September
Gold	Jeon Jee-heon; Kim Dong-hoon; Kim Ki-sung; Kim Beom-jun; Kim Jin-woong	Soft tennis	Men's team	1 September
Gold	Jun Woong-tae	Modern pentathlon	Men's individual	1 September
Gold	Oh Yeon-ji	Boxing	Women's 60 kg	1 September
Gold	Lee Yong-chan; Lee Jung-hoo; Hwang Jae-gyun; Choi Chung-yeon; Ham Deok-ju; Im Gi-yeong; Park Jong-hun; Lee Jae-won; An Chi-hong; Kim Ha-seong; Kim Jae-hwan; Kim Hyun-soo; Choi Won-tae; Jang Pill-joon; Im Chan-kyu; Yang Hyeon-jong; Jung Woo-ram; Park Chi-guk; Yang Eui-ji; Park Byung-ho; Park Min-woo; Oh Ji-hwan; Son Ah-seop; Park Hae-min	Baseball	Men's team	1 September
Gold	Song Bum-keun; Kim Min-jae; Jeong Tae-wook; Kim Moon-hwan; Jang Yun-ho; Kim Jung-min; Lee Jin-hyun; Lee Seung-woo; Son Heung-min; Hwang Ui-jo; Kim Jin-ya; Hwang Hyun-soo; Cho Yu-min; Lee Si-young; Lee Seung-mo; Hwang In-beom; Na Sang-ho; Hwang Hee-chan; Jo Hyeon-woo; Kim Geon-ung	Football	Men's tournament	1 September
Silver	Lee Dae-myung; Kim Min-jung	Shooting	Mixed 10 m air pistol team	19 August
Silver	Gwak Yeo-won; Park Jae-eun; Choi Dong-ah	Taekwondo	Women's team poomsae	19 August
Silver	Park Sang-young	Fencing	Men's individual épée	19 August
Silver	Kim Chun-pil; Kim Kyun-sub; Nam Dong-heon; Kim Hyeok	Equestrian	Team dressage	20 August
Silver	Ha Min-ah	Taekwondo	Women's 53 kg	20 August
Silver	Kim Jan-di	Taekwondo	Women's 67 kg	20 August
Silver	Oh Sang-uk	Fencing	Men's individual sabre	20 August
Silver	Jung Eun-hea	Shooting	Women's 10 m air rifle	20 August
Silver	Kang Gee-eun	Shooting	Women's trap	20 August
Silver	Cho Seung-jae	Wushu	Men's daoshu and gunshu	21 August
Silver	Lee Ah-reum	Taekwondo	Women's 57 kg	21 August
Silver	Kim Seo-yeong	Swimming	Women's 400 m individual medley	21 August
Silver	Kim Jin-oh; Lee Chang-min; Lim Moon-seob; Lee Seong-min; Lee Chul-soo	Paragliding	Men's team accuracy	22 August
Silver	Kim I-seul; Park Seon-ju; Lee Min-ju; Kim Ji-eun; Kim Hee-jin; Jung Ju-seung; Kim Dong-hee; Yu Seong-hee; Bae Ha-noul; Choi Ji-na; Jeon Gyu-mi; Kim Ji-young	Sepak takraw	Women's team regu	22 August
Silver	Lee Hwa-jun	Taekwondo	Men's 80 kg	22 August
Silver	Kim Dong-yong	Rowing	Men's single sculls	23 August
Silver	Jeon Seo-yeong; Kim Seo-hee	Rowing	Women's coxless pair	23 August
Silver	Kim Seul-gi; Kim Ye-ji	Rowing	Women's double sculls	23 August
Silver	Lee Da-gyeom	Paragliding	Women's individual accuracy	23 August
Silver	Kim Woo-jae	Weightlifting	Men's 77 kg	23 August
Silver	Kim Byung-hoon; Lee Min-hyuk	Rowing	Men's lightweight double sculls	24 August
Silver	Kim Min-jung	Shooting	Women's 10 metre air pistol	24 August
Silver	Lee Jang-kun; Kim Seong-ryeol; Lee Dong-geon; Ko Young-chang; Kim Dong-gyu; Jo Jae-pil; Eom Tae-deok; Hong Dong-ju; Park Hyun-il; Ok Yong-joo; Park Chan-sik; Kim Gyung-tae	Kabaddi	Men's tournament	24 August
Silver	Kim Han-sol	Gymnastics	Men's vault	24 August
Silver	Jang Yeon-hak	Weightlifting	Men's 85 kg	24 August
Silver	Lee Hye-in; Choi In-jeong; Shin A-lam; Kang Young-mi	Fencing	Women's team épée	24 August
Silver	Sa Sol	Sport climbing	Women's combined	26 August
Silver	Ryu Hae-ran; Jeong Yun-ji; Lim Hee-jeong	Golf	Women's team	26 August
Silver	Oh Seung-taek	Golf	Men's individual	26 August
Silver	An Young-jun; Yang Hong-seok; Kim Nak-hyeon; Park In-tae	Basketball	Men's 3x3 tournament	26 August
Silver	Kim Woo-jin; Oh Jin-hyek; Lee Woo-seok	Archery	Men's team recurve	27 August
Silver	Kim Jong-ho; So Chae-won	Archery	Mixed team compound	27 August
Silver	Park Jong-woo	Bowling	Men's masters	27 August
Silver	Lee Yeon-ji	Bowling	Women's masters	27 August
Silver	Woo Sang-hyeok	Athletics	Men's high jump	27 August
Silver	Son Young-hee	Weightlifting	Women's +75 kg	27 August
Silver	Lee Woo-seok	Archery	Men's individual recurve	28 August
Silver	Lee Hye-jin	Cycling	Women's keirin	28 August
Silver	Jang Woo-jin; Kim Dong-hyun; Lim Jong-hoon; Jeoung Young-sik; Lee Sang-su	Table tennis	Men's team	28 August
Silver	Kim Yeong-nam; Woo Ha-ram	Diving	Men's synchronized 3 m springboard	28 August
Silver	Park Da-sol	Judo	Women's 52 kg	29 August
Silver	Kim Yeong-nam; Woo Ha-ram	Diving	Men's synchronized 10 m platform	29 August
Silver	Cho Gwang-hee; Choi Min-kyu; Cho Jeong-hyun; Kim Ji-won	Canoeing	Men's K-4 500 m	30 August
Silver	Kim Ki-sung; Mun Hye-gyeong	Soft tennis	Mixed doubles	30 August
Silver	An Chang-rim	Judo	Men's 73 kg	30 August
Silver	Kim Seong-yeon	Judo	Women's 70 kg	30 August
Silver	Chae Bon-jin; Kim Dong-wook	Sailing	Men's 49er	31 August
Silver	Choi Gwang-ho	Roller sports	Men's roller skate 20 km	31 August
Silver	Lee Hye-jin	Cycling	Women's sprint	31 August
Silver	Park Sang-hoon; Kim Ok-cheol	Cycling	Men's madison	31 August
Silver	Park Yu-jin	Judo	Women's 78 kg	31 August
Silver	Cho Gu-ham	Judo	Men's 100 kg	31 August
Silver	Kim Se-hee	Modern pentathlon	Women's individual	31 August
Silver	Kim Min-jeong	Judo	Women's +78 kg	31 August
Silver	Baek Seol; Kim Young-hai; Yoo Ye-seul; Kim Ji-yeon; Mun Hye-gyeong	Soft tennis	Women's team	1 September
Silver	Lee Ji-hun	Modern pentathlon	Men's individual	1 September
Silver	Jeon Kwang-in; Jung Ji-seok; Kim Kyu-min; Choi Min-ho; Seo Jae-duck; Lee Min-gyu; Jeong Min-su; Song Myung-geun; Kwak Seung-suk; Kim Jae-hwi; Moon Sung-min; Na Gyeong-bok; Han Sun-soo; Bu Yong-chan	Volleyball	Men's tournament	1 September
Silver	Kim Ji-hwan; Jang Yun-jung; Heo Min-ho; Park Ye-jin	Triathlon	Mixed relay	2 September
Bronze	Yun Ji-hye	Taekwondo	Women's individual poomsae	19 August
Bronze	Kim Ji-yeon	Fencing	Women's individual sabre	19 August
Bronze	Jung Jin-sun	Fencing	Men's individual épée	19 August
Bronze	Lee Ju-ho	Swimming	Men's 100 m backstroke	19 August
Bronze	Gong Byung-min	Wrestling	Men's freestyle 74 kg	19 August
Bronze	Kim Jae-gang	Wrestling	Men's freestyle 97 kg	19 August
Bronze	Ahn Dae-myeong	Shooting	Men's trap	20 August
Bronze	Kang Ji-seok	Swimming	Men's 50 m backstroke	20 August
Bronze	Kim Hyung-joo	Wrestling	Women's freestyle 50 kg	20 August
Bronze	Nam Koung-jin	Wrestling	Men's freestyle 125 kg	20 August
Bronze	Lee Yong-mun	Wushu	Men's nanquan	21 August
Bronze	Choi In-jeong	Fencing	Women's individual épée	21 August
Bronze	An Se-hyeon	Swimming	Women's 100 m butterfly	21 August
Bronze	Son Young-ki	Fencing	Men's individual foil	21 August
Bronze	Baek Jin-hee; Jang Woo-young; Lee Da-gyeom	Paragliding	Women's team accuracy	22 August
Bronze	Park Kyoung-doo; Kweon Young-jun; Jung Jin-sun; Park Sang-young	Fencing	Men's team épée	22 August
Bronze	Kim Han-sol; Lee Jae-seong; Park Min-soo; Lee Hyeok-jung; Lee Jun-ho	Gymnastics	Men's artistic team all-around	22 August
Bronze	Kim Hyeon-woo	Wrestling	Men's Greco-Roman 77 kg	22 August
Bronze	Kim Min-jung	Shooting	Women's 25 m pistol	22 August
Bronze	Kim Min-seok	Wrestling	Men's Greco-Roman 130 kg	22 August
Bronze	Cho Gang-min	Taekwondo	Men's 63 kg	22 August
Bronze	Ham Gwan-sik	Wushu	Men's sanda 70 kg	22 August
Bronze	Moon Jae-kwon; Kang Ji-seok; Ko Mi-so; Park Ye-rin; Lee Ju-ho; Kim Jae-youn; An Se-hyeon; Kim Min-ju	Swimming	Mixed 4 × 100 m medley relay	22 August
Bronze	Kim Hyeok	Equestrian	Individual dressage	23 August
Bronze	Lee Chul-soo	Paragliding	Men's individual accuracy	23 August
Bronze	Jung Hye-ri; Choi Yu-ri; Ku Bo-yeun; Ji Yoo-jin	Rowing	Women's lightweight quadruple sculls	23 August
Bronze	Jeon Hee-sook; Chae Song-oh; Nam Hyun-hee; Hong Seo-in	Fencing	Women's team foil	23 August
Bronze	Lee Won-gyu	Shooting	Men's 300 metre standard rifle	24 August
Bronze	Lee Duck-hee	Tennis	Men's singles	24 August
Bronze	Park Hee-jun	Karate	Men's individual kata	25 August
Bronze	Kim Jun-hong	Shooting	Men's 25 m rapid fire pistol	25 August
Bronze	Hwang Myeng-se	Ju-jitsu	Men's 94 kg	25 August
Bronze	Mun Yu-ra	Weightlifting	Women's 69 kg	25 August
Bronze	Kim Ja-in	Sport climbing	Women's combined	26 August
Bronze	Kim Min-ji	Shooting	Women's skeet	26 August
Bronze	Mun Min-hee	Weightlifting	Women's 75 kg	26 August
Bronze	Kim Dong-min; Jang Seung-bo; Oh Seung-taek; Choi Ho-young	Golf	Men's team	26 August
Bronze	Kim Chae-woon; Lim Se-eun; Kim Joo-won; Seo Go-eun	Gymnastics	Women's rhythmic team all-around	27 August
Bronze	Lim Tae-gyun; Shim Jae-chul; Jeong Won-deok; Lee Jun-ho; Kim Young-man	Sepak takraw	Men's regu	27 August
Bronze	Koo Seong-hoi	Bowling	Men's masters	27 August
Bronze	Lee Yeon-ji	Bowling	Women's masters	27 August
Bronze	Kim Won-gyeong; Lee Hye-jin	Cycling	Women's team sprint	27 August
Bronze	Kang Chae-young	Archery	Women's individual recurve	28 August
Bronze	Choi Hyo-joo; Kim Ji-ho; Yang Ha-eun; Jeon Ji-hee; Seo Hyo-won	Table tennis	Women's team	28 August
Bronze	Lim Eun-ji	Athletics	Women's pole vault	28 August
Bronze	Kim Kyung-ae	Athletics	Women's javelin throw	28 August
Bronze	Kim Dong-hoon	Soft tennis	Men's singles	29 August
Bronze	Eun Ju-won	Roller sports	Men's skateboard street	29 August
Bronze	Lee Ha-rim	Judo	Men's 60 kg	29 August
Bronze	Kim You-ri	Cycling	Women's omnium	29 August
Bronze	Lee Sun-ja	Canoeing	Women's K-1 500 m	30 August
Bronze	Joo Hyun-myeong	Athletics	Men's 50 km walk	30 August
Bronze	Kim Beom-jun; Kim Ji-yeon	Soft tennis	Mixed doubles	30 August
Bronze	Im Chae-bin	Cycling	Men's sprint	30 August
Bronze	Han Hee-ju	Judo	Women's 63 kg	30 August
Bronze	Woo Ha-ram	Diving	Men's 1 m springboard	30 August
Bronze	Son Geun-seong	Roller sports	Men's roller skate 20 km	31 August
Bronze	Lee Tae-hoon	Sailing	Men's RS:X	31 August
Bronze	Cho Sun-young	Cycling	Women's sprint	31 August
Bronze	Jung Bo-ram; Kim Hye-ri; Hong Hye-ji; Shim Seo-yeon; Choe Yu-ri; Cho So-hyun; Jeon Ga-eul; Lee Geum-min; Ji So-yun; Moon Mi-ra; Yoon Young-geul; Shin Dam-yeong; Lim Seon-joo; Jang Sel-gi; Jang Chang; Lee Min-a; Han Chae-rin; Son Hwa-yeon; Lee Hyun-young; Lee Eun-mi	Football	Women's tournament	31 August
Bronze	Lee Chang-woo; Jang Dong-hyun; Yoon Ci-yoel; Jeong Yi-kyeong; Kim Dong-cheol; Jo Tae-hun; Hwang Do-yeop; Ku Chang-eun; Lee Dong-myung; Choi Beom-mun; Lee Hyeon-sik; Sim Jae-bok; Jung Su-young; Na Seung-do; Park Jung-geu; Jeong Jae-wan	Handball	Men's tournament	31 August
Bronze	Kim Sun-woo	Modern pentathlon	Women's individual	31 August
Bronze	Kim Su-ji	Diving	Women's 1 m springboard	31 August
Bronze	Jeon Ji-hee	Table tennis	Women's singles	1 September
Bronze	Lee Sang-su	Table tennis	Men's singles	1 September
Bronze	Kim Sun-hyung; Choi Jun-yong; Lee Jung-hyun; Jeon Jun-beom; Ricardo Ratliffe; Lee Seoung-hyun; Park Chan-hee; Heo Hoon; Heo Ung; Heo Il-young; Kim Jun-yl; Kang Sang-jae	Basketball	Men's tournament	1 September
Bronze	Hwang Min-kyoung; Kang So-hwi; Kim Yeon-koung; Lee Hyo-hee; Lee Ju-ah; Park Eun-jin; Yang Hyo-jin; Jung Ho-young; Kim Su-ji; Lee Da-yeong; Lee Jae-yeong; Na Hyun-jung; Park Jeong-ah; Yim Myung-ok	Volleyball	Women's tournament	1 September
Bronze	Cho Gu-ham; Lee Jae-yong; Gwak Dong-han; Kim Jan-di; Kim Min-jeong; Jeong Hye-jin; Kim Sung-min; An Chang-rim; Ahn Joo-sung; Kim Seong-yeon; Kwon You-jeong; Han Mi-jin	Judo	Mixed team	1 September
Bronze	Kim Gwong-min; Kim Sung-soo; Kim Jin-hyeok; Lee Jae-bok; Chang Yong-heung; Han Kun-kyu; Kim Nam-uk; Kim Jeong-min; Kim Hyun-soo; Jang Jeong-min; Jang Jeong-min; Hwang In-jo	Rugby sevens	Men's tournament	1 September
Bronze	Woo Ha-ram	Diving	Men's 10 m platform	1 September

Demonstration events

Medal	Name	Sport	Event	Date
Gold	Cho Seong-ju	eSports	StarCraft II tournament	28 August
Silver	Kim Ki-in; Go Dong-bin; Lee Sang-hyeok; Park Jae-hyuk; Jo Yong-in; Han Wang-ho	eSports	League of Legends tournament	28 August

Medals by sport
Sport	1st place, gold medalist(s)	2nd place, silver medalist(s)	3rd place, bronze medalist(s)	Total
Archery	4	3	1	8
Athletics	1	1	4	6
Baseball	1	0	0	1
Basketball	0	1	1	2
Bowling	2	2	2	6
Boxing	1	0	0	1
Canoeing	1	1	1	3
Cycling	6	3	4	13
Diving	0	2	3	5
Equestrian	0	1	1	2
Fencing	6	3	6	15
Football	1	0	1	2
Golf	0	2	1	3
Gymnastics	2	1	2	5
Handball	1	0	1	2
Ju-jitsu	1	0	1	2
Judo	4	6	3	13
Kabaddi	0	1	0	1
Karate	0	0	1	1
Modern pentathlon	1	2	1	4
Paragliding	1	2	2	5
Roller sports	0	1	2	3
Rowing	1	4	1	6
Rugby sevens	0	0	1	1
Sailing	1	1	1	3
Sepak takraw	0	1	1	2
Shooting	3	4	5	12
Soft tennis	2	2	2	6
Sport climbing	1	1	1	3
Swimming	1	1	4	6
Table tennis	0	1	3	4
Taekwondo	5	5	2	12
Tennis	0	0	1	1
Triathlon	0	1	0	1
Volleyball	0	1	1	2
Weightlifting	0	3	2	5
Wrestling	2	0	6	8
Wushu	0	1	2	3
Total	49	58	70	177

Medals by date
Day	Date	1st place, gold medalist(s)	2nd place, silver medalist(s)	3rd place, bronze medalist(s)	Total
Day 1	19 August	2	3	6	11
Day 2	20 August	3	6	4	13
Day 3	21 August	3	3	4	10
Day 4	22 August	3	3	9	15
Day 5	23 August	5	5	4	14
Day 6	24 August	7	6	2	15
Day 7	25 August	2	0	4	6
Day 8	26 August	2	4	4	10
Day 9	27 August	1	6	5	12
Day 10	28 August	4	4	4	12
Day 11	29 August	5	2	4	11
Day 12	30 August	2	4	6	12
Day 13	31 August	4	8	7	19
Day 14	1 September	6	3	7	16
Day 15	2 September	0	1	0	1
Total		49	58	70	177

Medals by gender
Gender	1st place, gold medalist(s)	2nd place, silver medalist(s)	3rd place, bronze medalist(s)	Total	Percentage
Male	29	28	40	97	55%
Female	20	25	29	74	42%
Mixed	0	5	1	6	3%
Total	49	58	70	177	100%

== Competitors ==
The following is a list of the number of competitors representing South Korea that participated at the Games:

Sport	Men	Women	Total
Archery	8	8	16
Artistic swimming	—	10	10
Athletics	22	18	40
Badminton	10	10	20
Baseball	24	—	24
Basketball	16	4	20
Bowling	6	6	12
Boxing	7	3	10
Canoeing	13	5	18
Cycling	18	9	27
Diving	2	4	6
Equestrian	11	0	11
Fencing	12	12	24
Field hockey	18	18	36
Football	20	20	40
Golf	4	3	7
Gymnastics	5	9	14
Handball	16	16	32
Jet ski	6	0	6
Ju-jitsu	1	1	2
Judo	9	10	19
Kabaddi	12	11	23
Karate	4	4	8
Kurash	1	1	2
Modern pentathlon	2	2	4
Paragliding	5	3	8
Roller sports	6	2	8
Rowing	10	8	18
Rugby sevens	12	12	24
Sailing	8	3	11
Sepak takraw	15	12	27
Shooting	18	10	28
Soft tennis	5	5	10
Softball	—	17	17
Sport climbing	7	7	14
Squash	4	4	8
Swimming	14	13	27
Table tennis	5	5	10
Taekwondo	9	9	18
Tennis	6	6	12
Triathlon	2	3	5
Volleyball	16	16	32
Water polo	13	0	13
Weightlifting	8	7	15
Wrestling	12	6	18
Wushu	10	2	12
Total	432	334	766

Demonstration events

Sport	Men	Women	Total
eSports	7	0	7

As competitors representing the unified Korea
Sport	Men	Women	Total
Basketball	0	10	10
Canoeing	8	8	16
Rowing	7	1	8
Total	15	19	34

== Archery ==
Recurve

Athlete	Event	Ranking round		Round of 64	Round of 32	Round of 16	Quarterfinals	Semifinals	Final / BM	
Athlete	Event	Score	Seed	Opposition Score	Opposition Score	Opposition Score	Opposition Score	Opposition Score	Opposition Score	Rank
Im Dong-hyun	Men's individual	679	QW	Did not advance						
Kim Woo-jin	Men's individual	672	2 A	Bye	Tan (SGP); W 7–1	Muto (JPN); W 7–1	Furakawa (JPN); W 6–4	Agatha (INA); W 6–2	Lee (KOR); W 6–4	1st place, gold medalist(s)
Lee Woo-seok	Men's individual	675	1 A	Bye	Ma (HKG); W 6–2	Chu (VIE); W 7–1	Wei (TPE); W 7–1	Abdullin (KAZ); W 7–1	Kim (KOR); L 4–6	2nd place, silver medalist(s)
Oh Jin-hyek	Men's individual	683 =GR	QW	Did not advance						
Kim Woo-jin; Lee Woo-seok; Oh Jin-hyek	Men's team	2037 GR	1 Q	—N/a	Bye	Saudi Arabia; W 6–0	India; W 5–1	China; W 5–3	Chinese Taipei; L 3–5	2nd place, silver medalist(s)
Chang Hye-jin	Women's individual	677	2 A	Bye	Kaboksy (LAO); W 6–0	Nguyen (VIE); W 6–4	Choirunisa (INA); L 3–7	Did not advance		
Jung Dasomi	Women's individual	674		Did not advance						
Kang Chae-young	Women's individual	681 =GR	1 Q	Bye	Tagle (PHI); W 6–2	Bishindee (MGL); W 7–3	Cao (CHN); W 6–2	Zhang (CHN); L 4–6	Lei (TPE); W 6–4	3rd place, bronze medalist(s)
Lee Eun-gyeong	Women's individual	680	QW	Did not advance						
Chang Hye-jin; Kang Chae-young; Lee Eun-gyeong	Women's team	2038 GR	1 Q	—N/a		Bye	North Korea; W 6–0	Japan; W 6–2	Chinese Taipei; W 5–3	1st place, gold medalist(s)
Lee Woo-seok; Chang Hye-jin	Mixed team	1364 WR^{*}	1 Q	—N/a	Bye	Kyrgyzstan; W 6–0	Mongolia; L 1–5	Did not advance		

^{*} Oh Jin-hyek and Kang Chae-young took part in the ranking round.

Compound

Athlete	Event	Ranking round		Round of 32	Round of 16	Quarterfinals	Semifinals	Final / BM	
Athlete	Event	Score	Seed	Opposition Score	Opposition Score	Opposition Score	Opposition Score	Opposition Score	Rank
Choi Yong-hee; Hong Sung-ho; Kim Jong-ho; Kim Tae-yoon ^{**}	Men's team	2116 GR	1 Q	—N/a	Mongolia; W 233–205	Indonesia; W 231–220	Malaysia; W 235–229	India; W 229–229	1st place, gold medalist(s)
Choi Bo-min; So Chae-won; Song Yun-soo; Kim Yun-hee ^{**}	Women's team	2105 GR	1 Q	—N/a	Bye	Thailand; W 233–226	Iran; W 231–228	India; W 231–228	1st place, gold medalist(s)
Kim Jong-ho; So Chae-won	Mixed team	1412 WR^{***}	1 Q	Bye	Laos; W 157–151	Indonesia; W 153–148	Singapore; W 156–152	Chinese Taipei; L 150–151	2nd place, silver medalist(s)

^{**} Did not play.
^{***} Choi Yong-hee and So Chae-won took part in the ranking round.

== Artistic swimming ==
Athlete	Event	Technical routine		Free routine		Total	Rank
Athlete	Event	Points	Rank	Points	Rank	Total	Rank
Choi Jung-yeon; Uhm Ji-wan^{FR} Lee Ri-young^{TR}	Duet	75.8941	6	78.8000	5	154.6941	6
Baek Seo-yeon; Choi Jung-yeon; Jung Young-hee; Kim So-jin; Koo Ye-mo; Lee Ri-young; Lee You-jin; Uhm Ji-wan; Kim Jun-hee^{RR} Lee Jae-hyun^{RR}	Team	75.7956	6	77.4667	6	153.2623	6

FR: Reserved in free routine; RR: Reserved in technical and free routines; TR: Reserved in technical routine.

== Athletics ==
Track

Athlete	Event	Heats		Semifinals		Final	
Athlete	Event	Result	Rank	Result	Rank	Result	Rank
Oh Kyong-soo	Men's 100 m	10.62	4 Q	10.61	5	Did not advance	
Kim Kuk-young	Men's 100 m	10.43	3 Q	10.33	4 q	10.26	8
Kim Kuk-young	Men's 200 m	20.78	2 Q	20.66	3 Q	20.59	4
Park Tae-geon	Men's 200 m	20.77	1 Q	20.69	3 Q	20.61	5
Mo Il-hwan	Men's 400 m	47.34	3 Q	46.73	5	Did not advance	
Oh Jae-won	Men's 800 m	1:59.58	8	—N/a		Did not advance	
Oh Jae-won	Men's 1500 m	3:50.28	6 q	—N/a		4:01.97	11
Kim Byoung-jun	Men's 110 m hurdles	13.73	3 q	—N/a		13.57	5
Han Se-hyun	Men's 400 m hurdles	50.69	3 q	—N/a		51.65	8
Kim Kuk-young; Kim Min-kyun; Mo Il-hwan; Oh Kyong-soo; Park Tae-geon; Shin Min-kyu ^{*}	Men's 4 × 100 m relay	39.34	3 Q	—N/a		39.10	5
You Jin	Women's 100 m	12.06	6	Did not advance			
Kim Min-ji	Women's 100 m	11.81	4 q	12.03	8	Did not advance	
Kim Min-ji	Women's 200 m	23.88	3 Q	23.86	5	Did not advance	
Lee Min-jung	Women's 200 m	24.55	3 Q	24.36	6	Did not advance	
Kim Ga-kyeong	Women's 800 m	2:15.09	5	—N/a		Did not advance	
Kim Ga-kyeong	Women's 1500 m	—N/a				4:32.31	11
Jung Hye-lim	Women's 100 m hurdles	13.17	1 Q	—N/a		13.20	1st place, gold medalist(s)
Jo Ha-rim	Women's 3000 m steeplechase	—N/a				10:17.31	9
Jung Hye-lim; Kim Min-ji; Lee Min-jung; You Jin	Women's 4 × 100 m relay	46.04	6	—N/a		Did not advance	

^{*} Did not play.

Road

Athlete	Event	Final	
Athlete	Event	Result	Rank
Kim Jae-hoon	Men's marathon	2:36:22	12
Shin Kwang-sik	Men's marathon	2:56:16	15
Choe Byeong-kwang	Men's 20 km walk	1:29:49	7
Kim Hyun-sub	Men's 20 km walk	1:27:17	4
Joo Hyun-myeong	Men's 50 km walk	4:10:21	3rd place, bronze medalist(s)
Park Chil-sung	Men's 50 km walk	DQ	
Choi Kyung-sun	Women's marathon	2:37:49	4
Kim Do-yeon	Women's marathon	2:39:28	6
Jeon Yeong-eun	Women's 20 km walk	1:37:31	5
Lee Jeong-eun	Women's 20 km walk	1:40:14	7

Field

Athlete	Event	Qualification		Final	
Athlete	Event	Distance	Rank	Distance	Rank
Woo Sang-hyeok	Men's high jump	2.15	=1 Q	2.28	2nd place, silver medalist(s)
Jin Min-sub	Men's pole vault	—N/a		5.40	=5
Joo Eun-jae	Men's long jump	7.56	10 q	7.63	9
Kim Deok-hyeon	Men's long jump	7.61	8 q	7.65	8
Jung Il-woo	Men's shot put	—N/a		19.15	4
Lee Yun-chul	Men's hammer throw	—N/a		71.10	5
Seok Mi-jung	Women's high jump	—N/a		1.70	=11
Lim Eun-ji	Women's pole vault	—N/a		4.20	3rd place, bronze medalist(s)
Kim Min-ji	Women's long jump	—N/a		6.27	6
Lee Mi-young	Women's shot put	—N/a		15.49	6
Bae Chan-mi	Women's triple jump	—N/a		12.68	7
Park Seo-jin	Women's hammer throw	—N/a		59.00	7
Gim Gyeong-ae	Women's javelin throw	—N/a		56.74	3rd place, bronze medalist(s)

Combined

Athlete	Event	100	LJ	SP	HJ	400	110H	DT	PV	JT	1500	Point	Rank
Choe Dong-hwi	Men's decathlon	11.04	7.19	12.77	1.82	51.85	14.27	36.46	4.60	53.14	4:45.21	7345	6

Athlete	Event	100H	HJ	SP	200	LJ	JT	800	Point	Rank
Jeong Yeon-jin	Women's heptathlon	13.99	1.67	10.66	26.91	5.59	35.64	2:23.32	5179	9

== Badminton ==
Men

Athlete	Event	Round of 64	Round of 32	Round of 16	Quarterfinals	Semifinals	Final	
Athlete	Event	Opposition Score	Opposition Score	Opposition Score	Opposition Score	Opposition Score	Opposition Score	Rank
Son Wan-ho	Singles	Bye	R Tamang (NEP); W (21–8, 21–9)	Lee Z J (MAS); W (21–11, 21–17)	K Nishimoto (JPN); L (17–21, 11–21)	Did not advance		
Heo Kwang-hee	Singles	Bye	Liew D (MAS); W (21–8, 20–22, 21–14)	Chen L (CHN); L (22–24, 18–21)	Did not advance			
Choi Sol-gyu; Kang Min-hyuk	Doubles	—N/a	D Karunaratne / N Karunaratne (SRI); W (21–16, 21–17)	S Rankireddy / C Shetty (IND); L (21–17, 19–21, 17–21)	Did not advance			
Kim Won-ho; Seo Seung-jae	Doubles	—N/a	Chen H-l / Wang C-l (TPE); W (21–12, 15–21, 21–17)	F Alfian / M R Ardianto (INA); L (18–21, 13–21)	Did not advance			
Choi Sol-gyu; Ha Young-woong; Heo Kwang-hee; Kang Min-hyuk; Kim Jae-hwan; Kim Won-ho; Lee Dong-keun; Park Kyung-hoon; Seo Seung-jae; Son Wan-ho	Team	—N/a		Thailand; W 3–1	Japan; L 0–3	Did not advance		

Women

Athlete	Event	Round of 32	Round of 16	Quarterfinals	Semifinals	Final	
Athlete	Event	Opposition Score	Opposition Score	Opposition Score	Opposition Score	Opposition Score	Rank
Sung Ji-hyun	Singles	M Shahzad (PAK); W (21–9, 21–10)	R Intanon (THA); L (15–21, 22–24)	Did not advance			
An Se-young	Singles	Chen (CHN); L (15–21, 8–21)	Did not advance				
Lee So-hee; Shin Seung-chan	Doubles	S Akram / M Shahzad (PAK); W (21–3, 21–6)	R A Harbesh / S Almutairi (KSA); W (21–4, 21–7)	Y Fukushima / S Hirota (JPN); L (13–21, 17–21)	Did not advance		
Kim Hye-rin; Kong Hee-yong	Doubles	Ng T Y / Yuen S Y (HKG); W (21–10, 21–17)	A Giri / R Maharjan (NEP); W (21–7, 21–1)	M Matsutomo / A Takahashi (JPN); L (10–21, 7–21)	Did not advance		
An Se-young; Baek Ha-na; Chae Yoo-jung; Jeon Ju-i; Kim Hye-rin; Kong Hee-yong; Lee Se-yeon; Lee So-hee; Shin Seung-chan; Sung Ji-hyun	Team	—N/a	Bye	Indonesia; L 1–3	Did not advance		

Mixed

Athlete	Event	Round of 32	Round of 16	Quarterfinals	Semifinals	Final	
Athlete	Event	Opposition Score	Opposition Score	Opposition Score	Opposition Score	Opposition Score	Rank
Seo Seung-jae; Chae Yoo-jung	Doubles	T A Mohamed / F N Abdul Razzaq (MDV); W (21–2, 21–6)	T Ahmad / L Natsir (INA); L (20–22, 17–21)	Did not advance			
Choi Sol-gyu; Shin Seung-chan	Doubles	Y Watanabe / A Higashino (JPN); L (21–12, 20–22, 15–21)	Did not advance				

== Baseball ==
Team	Event	Round 1		Round 2		Super / Consolation		Final / BM	
Team	Event	Oppositions Scores	Rank	Oppositions Scores	Rank	Oppositions Scores	Rank	Opposition Score	Rank
South Korea men's	Men's tournament	Bye		Chinese Taipei: L 1–2; Indonesia: W 15–0; Hong Kong: W 21–3	2 Q	Japan: W 5–1; China: W 10–1	1 Q	Japan; W 3–0	1st place, gold medalist(s)

The following is the South Korea roster for the men's baseball tournament of the 2018 Asian Games. The team of 24 players was officially named on 11 June 2018.

Manager
Sun Dong-yol

Pos.	No.	Player	Date of birth (age)	Bats	Throws	Club
P	54	Yang Hyeon-jong	1 March 1988 (aged 30)			(South Korea) Kia Tigers
P	38	Im Gi-yeong	16 April 1993 (aged 25)			(South Korea) Kia Tigers
P	66	Park Chi-guk	10 March 1998 (aged 20)			(South Korea) Doosan Bears
P	45	Lee Yong-chan	2 January 1989 (aged 29)			(South Korea) Doosan Bears
P	61	Ham Deok-ju	13 January 1995 (aged 23)			(South Korea) Doosan Bears
P	50	Park Jong-hun	13 August 1991 (aged 27)			(South Korea) SK Wyverns
P	1	Im Chan-kyu	20 November 1992 (aged 25)			(South Korea) LG Twins
P	30	Choi Won-tae	7 January 1997 (aged 21)			(South Korea) Nexen Heroes
P	57	Jung Woo-ram	1 June 1985 (aged 33)			(South Korea) Hanwha Eagles
P	42	Jang Pill-joon	8 April 1988 (aged 30)			(South Korea) Samsung Lions
P	51	Choi Chung-yeon	5 March 1997 (aged 21)			(South Korea) Samsung Lions
C	25	Yang Eui-ji	5 June 1987 (aged 31)			(South Korea) Doosan Bears
C	20	Lee Jae-won	24 February 1988 (aged 30)			(South Korea) SK Wyverns
IF	8	An Chi-hong	2 July 1990 (aged 28)			(South Korea) Kia Tigers
IF	13	Park Min-woo	6 February 1993 (aged 25)			(South Korea) NC Dinos
IF	2	Oh Ji-hwan	12 March 1990 (aged 28)			(South Korea) LG Twins
IF	7	Kim Ha-seong	17 October 1995 (aged 22)			(South Korea) Nexen Heroes
IF	52	Park Byung-ho	10 July 1986 (aged 32)			(South Korea) Nexen Heroes
IF	10	Hwang Jae-gyun	28 July 1987 (aged 31)			(South Korea) KT Wiz
OF	32	Kim Jae-hwan	22 September 1988 (aged 29)			(South Korea) Doosan Bears
OF	31	Son Ah-seop	18 March 1988 (aged 30)			(South Korea) Lotte Giants
OF	22	Kim Hyun-soo (captain)	12 January 1988 (aged 30)			(South Korea) LG Twins
OF	17	Lee Jung-hoo	20 August 1998 (aged 20)			(South Korea) Nexen Heroes
OF	58	Park Hae-min	24 February 1990 (aged 28)			(South Korea) Samsung Lions

Round 2 – Group B

Pos	Team	Pld	W	L	RF	RA	PCT	GB	Qualification
1	Chinese Taipei	3	3	0	33	2	1.000	—	Super round
2	South Korea	3	2	1	37	5	.667	1	Super round
3	Hong Kong	3	1	2	11	41	.333	2	Consolation round
4	Indonesia	3	0	3	4	37	.000	3	Consolation round

Source: OCA

26 August; 18:30	South Korea	1–2	Chinese Taipei	Gelora Bung Karno Baseball Field, Jakarta; Attendance: 1,750; Umpires: Tomohisa Yamaguchi (JPN)
26 August; 18:30	LP: Yang Hyeon-jong	Boxscore	WP: Wu Sheng-feng; Sv: Wang Cheng-hao	Gelora Bung Karno Baseball Field, Jakarta; Attendance: 1,750; Umpires: Tomohisa Yamaguchi (JPN)
26 August; 18:30	HR: Kim Jae-hwan (1)	Boxscore	HR: Lin Chia-yu (1)	Gelora Bung Karno Baseball Field, Jakarta; Attendance: 1,750; Umpires: Tomohisa Yamaguchi (JPN)

Team	1	2	3	4	5	6	7	8	9	R	H	E
Chinese Taipei	2	0	0	0	0	0	0	0	0	2	5	0
South Korea	0	0	0	1	0	0	0	0	0	1	6	0

27 August; 18:30	South Korea	15–0 (F/5)	Indonesia	Gelora Bung Karno Baseball Field, Jakarta; Attendance: 150; Umpires: Yoshinori Koide (JPN)
27 August; 18:30	WP: Choi Won-tae	Boxscore	LP: Nanda Dwi Saputra	Gelora Bung Karno Baseball Field, Jakarta; Attendance: 150; Umpires: Yoshinori Koide (JPN)
27 August; 18:30	HR: Hwang Jae-gyun (2)	Boxscore		Gelora Bung Karno Baseball Field, Jakarta; Attendance: 150; Umpires: Yoshinori Koide (JPN)

Team	1	2	3	4	5	6	7	8	9	R	H	E
Indonesia	0	0	0	0	0	—	—	—	—	0	3	3
South Korea	1	4	6	2	2	—	—	—	—	15	13	0

28 August; 12:00	Hong Kong	3–21	South Korea	Gelora Bung Karno Baseball Field, Jakarta; Attendance: 600; Umpires: Huang Jun-jeh (TPE)
28 August; 12:00	LP: Yeung Kun Hin	Boxscore	WP: Lee Yong-chan	Gelora Bung Karno Baseball Field, Jakarta; Attendance: 600; Umpires: Huang Jun-jeh (TPE)
28 August; 12:00	HR: Matthew Andrew Holliday (1)	Boxscore	HR: Lee Jung-hoo (2), Hwang Jae-gyun (1), Lee Jae-won (1), Park Byung-ho (1)	Gelora Bung Karno Baseball Field, Jakarta; Attendance: 600; Umpires: Huang Jun-jeh (TPE)

Team	1	2	3	4	5	6	7	8	9	R	H	E
South Korea	1	0	1	3	0	3	0	3	10	21	16	0
Hong Kong	0	1	0	1	0	1	0	0	0	3	8	3

Super round

Pos	Team	Pld	W	L	RF	RA	PCT	GB	Qualification
1	South Korea	3	2	1	16	4	.667 (Note: Tied on head-to-head wins (1). Team quality balance: KOR +0.167, JPN +0.056, TPE −0.222.)	—	Gold medal match
2	Japan	3	2	1	23	7	.667	—	Gold medal match
3	Chinese Taipei	3	2	1	3	6	.667	—	Bronze medal match
4	China	3	0	3	3	28	.000	2	Bronze medal match

Source: OCA
Notes:

30 August; 12:00	Japan	1–5	South Korea	Gelora Bung Karno Baseball Field, Jakarta; Attendance: 637; Umpires: Chu Hsu-kuang (TPE)
30 August; 12:00	LP: Katsutoshi Satake	Boxscore	WP: Lee Yong-chan	Gelora Bung Karno Baseball Field, Jakarta; Attendance: 637; Umpires: Chu Hsu-kuang (TPE)
30 August; 12:00		Boxscore	HR: Kim Ha-seong (1), Park Byung-ho (1), Hwang Jae-gyun (1)	Gelora Bung Karno Baseball Field, Jakarta; Attendance: 637; Umpires: Chu Hsu-kuang (TPE)

Team	1	2	3	4	5	6	7	8	9	R	H	E
South Korea	0	0	2	1	2	0	0	0	0	5	14	1
Japan	0	0	0	0	0	1	0	0	0	1	6	1

31 August; 14:00	South Korea	10–1	China	Gelora Bung Karno Baseball Field, Jakarta; Attendance: 400; Umpires: Huang Jun-jeh (TPE)
31 August; 14:00	WP: Im Gi-yeong	Boxscore	LP: Gong Haicheng	Gelora Bung Karno Baseball Field, Jakarta; Attendance: 400; Umpires: Huang Jun-jeh (TPE)
31 August; 14:00	HR: Park Byung-ho (1)	Boxscore		Gelora Bung Karno Baseball Field, Jakarta; Attendance: 400; Umpires: Huang Jun-jeh (TPE)

Team	1	2	3	4	5	6	7	8	9	R	H	E
China	0	0	0	0	0	0	1	0	0	1	8	2
South Korea	1	0	0	1	3	3	2	0	X	10	15	0

Final

1 September; 16:00	South Korea	3–0	Japan	Gelora Bung Karno Baseball Field, Jakarta; Attendance: 1,700; Umpires: Huang Jun-jeh (TPE)
1 September; 16:00	WP: Yang Hyeon-jong; Sv: Jung Woo-ram	Boxscore	LP: Ryoga Tomiyama	Gelora Bung Karno Baseball Field, Jakarta; Attendance: 1,700; Umpires: Huang Jun-jeh (TPE)
1 September; 16:00	HR: Park Byung-ho (1)	Boxscore		Gelora Bung Karno Baseball Field, Jakarta; Attendance: 1,700; Umpires: Huang Jun-jeh (TPE)

Team	1	2	3	4	5	6	7	8	9	R	H	E
Japan	0	0	0	0	0	0	0	0	0	0	1	0
South Korea	2	0	1	0	0	0	0	0	X	3	4	2

== Basketball ==
Team	Event	Group Stage					Quarterfinals	Semifinals / Pl.	Final / BM / Pl.	
Team	Event	Opposition Score	Opposition Score	Opposition Score	Opposition Score	Rank	Opposition Score	Opposition Score	Opposition Score	Rank
South Korea men's	Men's tournament	—N/a	Indonesia; W 104–65	Mongolia; W 108–73	Thailand; W 117–77	1 Q	Philippines; W 91–82	Iran; L 68–80	Chinese Taipei; W 89–81	3rd place, bronze medalist(s)
South Korea men's	Men's 3x3 tournament	Kyrgyzstan; W 21–12	Chinese Taipei; W 20–18	Bangladesh; W 21–7	Mongolia; W 21–9	1 Q	Kazakhstan; W 17–13	Thailand; W 20–16	China; L 18–19	2nd place, silver medalist(s)
South Korea women's	Women's 3x3 tournament	—N/a	Syria; W 16–15	Sri Lanka; W 21–8	Indonesia; W 22–9	1 Q	Chinese Taipei; L 11–15	Did not advance		

=== 5x5 basketball ===
As the defending champion, South Korea men's team drawn in the group A at the competition.

==== Men's tournament ====
Roster

The following is the South Korea roster in the men's basketball tournament of the 2018 Asian Games.

South Korea men's national basketball team – 2018 Asian Games roster
Players
Coaches

Pos.	No.	Name	Age – Date of birth	Height	Club	Ctr.
C	0	Kim Jun-yl	26 – May 7, 1992	2.01 m (6 ft 7 in)	Seoul Samsung Thunders	(South Korea)
G	1	Park Chan-hee	31 – April 17, 1987	1.91 m (6 ft 3 in)	Incheon Electroland Elephants	(South Korea)
F	2	Choi Jun-yong	24 – April 4, 1994	2.01 m (6 ft 7 in)	Seoul SK Knights	(South Korea)
F	3	Lee Jung-hyun	31 – March 3, 1987	1.91 m (6 ft 3 in)	Jeonju KCC Egis	(South Korea)
G	5	Kim Sun-hyung	30 – July 1, 1988	1.87 m (6 ft 2 in)	Seoul SK Knights	(South Korea)
G	6	Heo Hoon	22 – August 16, 1995	1.80 m (5 ft 11 in)	Busan KT Sonicboom	(South Korea)
G	9	Heo Ung	25 – August 5, 1993	1.85 m (6 ft 1 in)	Wonju DB Promy	(South Korea)
F	11	Heo Il-young	33 – August 5, 1985	1.96 m (6 ft 5 in)	Goyang Orion Orions	(South Korea)
C	13	Kang Sang-jae	23 – December 31, 1994	2.01 m (6 ft 7 in)	Incheon Electroland Elephants	(South Korea)
F	17	Jeon Jun-beom	26 – August 27, 1991	1.93 m (6 ft 4 in)	Ulsan Mobis Phoebus	(South Korea)
C	20	Ricardo Ratliffe (NP)	29 – February 20, 1989	2.03 m (6 ft 8 in)	Ulsan Mobis Phoebus	(South Korea)
F	33	Lee Seoung-hyun	26 – April 16, 1992	1.97 m (6 ft 6 in)	Goyang Orion Orions	(South Korea)

Head coach

- (South Korea) Hur Jae

Assistant coach(es)

- (South Korea) Kim Sang-shik

Legend

- (C) Team captain
- (NP) Naturalized player
- Club – describes last
  club before the tournament
- Age – describes age
  on 14 August 2018

Group A

Pos	Team	Pld	W	L	PF	PA	PD	Pts	Qualification
1	South Korea	3	3	0	329	215	+114	6	Quarterfinals
2	Indonesia	3	1	2	232	264	−32	4 (Note: Tied on head-to-head wins (1). Head-to-head game points difference: INA +7, MGL +4, THA −11.)	Quarterfinals
3	Mongolia	3	1	2	233	264	−31	4	
4	Thailand	3	1	2	250	301	−51	4	

Source: OCA
Notes:

14 August
18:30

Indonesia	65–104	South Korea
Scoring by quarter: 18–28, 13–25, 14–27, 20–24
Pts: Prastawa 20; Rebs: Johnson 8 Asts: Johnson 3		Pts: Ra 30; Rebs: Ra 19; Asts: Kim S. 7

Gelora Bung Karno Basketball Hall, Jakarta
Referees: Yuen Chun Yip (HKG), Hadi Salem (IRI), Anan Daraghma (PLE)

16 August
16:00

South Korea	108–73	Mongolia
Scoring by quarter: 26–15, 30–17, 23–24, 29–17
Pts: Heo I. 20; Rebs: Ra 14; Asts: Kim S. 6		Pts: Batbayar 15; Rebs: Bilgüün 6 Asts: Sanchir, Bilgüün, Batbayar 3

Gelora Bung Karno Basketball Hall, Jakarta
Referees: Imran Ali Baig (IND), Kumiko Kumagai (JPN), Chen Ying-cheng (TPE)

22 August
18:30

South Korea	117–77	Thailand
Scoring by quarter: 26–16, 36–20, 29–18, 26–23
Pts: Ra 21; Rebs: Kang, Lee S. 8 Asts: Park 7		Pts: Suktub 17; Rebs: Klahan, Ananti 6 Asts: Leelaphipatkul 6

Gelora Bung Karno Basketball Hall, Jakarta
Referees: Mohammad Doust (IRI), Chen Ying-cheng (TPE), Anan Daraghma (PLE)

Quarterfinal

27 August
10:00

South Korea	91–82	Philippines
Scoring by quarter: 22–18, 20–26, 22–21, 27–17
Pts: Ra 30; Rebs: Ra 14; Asts: Kim S. 10		Pts: Clarkson 25; Rebs: Standhardinger 9 Asts: Lee 5

Gelora Bung Karno Basketball Hall, Jakarta
Referees: Yuen Chun Yip (HKG), Alexey Stepanenko (KAZ), Imran Ali Baig (IND)

Semifinal

30 August
16:00

South Korea	68–80	Iran
Scoring by quarter: 14–21, 14–19, 20–23, 20–17
Pts: Ra 37; Rebs: Ra 12; Asts: Lee J. 7		Pts: Haddadi 23; Rebs: Hassanzadeh 11; Asts: Haddadi 8

Istora Gelora Bung Karno, Jakarta
Referees: Ferdinand Pascual (PHI), Alexey Stepanenko (KAZ), Jun Horiuchi (JPN)

Bronze medal match

1 September
12:30

South Korea	89–81	Chinese Taipei
Scoring by quarter: 21–11, 24–22, 27–20, 17–28
Pts: Ra 37; Rebs: Ra 17; Asts: Lee S. 15		Pts: Liu 25; Rebs: Liu 7 Asts: Chen Y. 7

Istora Gelora Bung Karno, Jakarta
Referees: Alexey Stepanenko (KAZ), Hadi Salem (IRI), Preeda Muongmee (THA)

=== 3x3 basketball ===
South Korea also set a men's and women's team that competed in the 3-on-3 basketball. The men's team placed in the pool B, and the women's team in the pool D based on the FIBA 3x3 federation ranking.

==== Men's tournament ====
Roster

Korea Basketball Association (KBA) selected four athletes for the men's 3x3 basketball tournament of the 2018 Asian Games.

- An Young-jun
- Yang Hong-seok
- Kim Nak-hyeon
- Park In-tae

Pool B

Pos	Team	Pld	W	L	PF	PA	PD	Qualification
1	South Korea	4	4	0	83	46	+37	Quarterfinals
2	Chinese Taipei	4	3	1	79	50	+29	Quarterfinals
3	Mongolia	4	2	2	63	68	−5	
4	Kyrgyzstan	4	1	3	44	71	−27	
5	Bangladesh	4	0	4	35	69	−34	

Source: OCA

22 August
16:00

Kyrgyzstan	12–21	South Korea
Pts: Mushtruev 4		Pts: Yang 8

Gelora Bung Karno Tennis Center Court, Jakarta
Referees: Rulyov (KAZ), Liu (MAS)

22 August
17:10

South Korea	20–18	Chinese Taipei
Pts: An 9		Pts: Chu 11

Gelora Bung Karno Tennis Center Court, Jakarta
Referees: Rulyov (KAZ), Ibragimow (TKM)

25 August
19:20

Bangladesh	7–21	South Korea
Pts: Rahman 6		Pts: An 12

Gelora Bung Karno Tennis Center Court, Jakarta
Referees: Ibragimow (TKM), Rulyov (KAZ)

25 August
20:30

South Korea	21–9	Mongolia
Pts: An 9		Pts: Mönkh-Orgil 6

Gelora Bung Karno Tennis Center Court, Jakarta
Referees: Liu (MAS), Rulyov (KAZ)

Quarterfinal

26 August
16:10

South Korea	17–13	Kazakhstan
Pts: Kim 7		Pts: Aitkali 6

Gelora Bung Karno Tennis Center Court, Jakarta
Referees: Liu (MAS), Tan (SGP)

Semifinal

26 August
18:30

South Korea	20–16	Thailand
Pts: An 8		Pts: Korsah-dick 9

Gelora Bung Karno Tennis Center Court, Jakarta
Referees: Ho (HKG), Ibragimow (TKM)

Final

26 August
21:00

China	19–18 (OT)	South Korea
Pts: Huang 7		Pts: An 10

Gelora Bung Karno Tennis Center Court, Jakarta
Referees: Ito (JPN), Quinn (INA)

==== Women's tournament ====
Roster

The following is the South Korea roster in the women's 3x3 basketball tournament of the 2018 Asian Games.

- Choi Gyu-hee
- Kim Jin-yeong
- Park Ji-eun
- Kim Jin-hee

Pool D

Pos	Team	Pld	W	L	PF	PA	PD	Qualification
1	South Korea	3	3	0	59	32	+27	Quarterfinals
2	Indonesia	3	2	1	46	46	0	Quarterfinals
3	Sri Lanka	3	1	2	32	54	−22	
4	Syria	3	0	3	42	47	−5	

Source: OCA

22 August
20:50

Syria	15–16	South Korea
Pts: Assad 7		Pts: Choi 7

Gelora Bung Karno Tennis Center Court, Jakarta
Referees: Al-Harthi (OMA), Tan (SGP)

25 August
15:40

South Korea	21–8	Sri Lanka
Pts: Kim J.Y. 10		Pts: Perera 5

Gelora Bung Karno Tennis Center Court, Jakarta
Referees: Shi (CHN), Ito (JPN)

25 August
18:40

Indonesia	9–22	South Korea
Pts: Sriartha 5		Pts: Kim J.Y. 10

Gelora Bung Karno Tennis Center Court, Jakarta
Referees: Rulyov (KAZ), Lim (MAS)

Quarterfinal

26 August
15:00

South Korea	11–15	Chinese Taipei
Pts: Kim J.Y. 8		Pts: Lin 5

Gelora Bung Karno Tennis Center Court, Jakarta
Referees: Lim (MAS), Ibragimow (TKM)

== Bowling ==
Men

Athlete	Event	Block 1	Block 2	Total	Rank	Stepladder final 1	Stepladder final 2	Rank
Athlete	Event	Result	Result	Total	Rank	Opposition Result	Opposition Result	Rank
Koo Seong-hoi	Masters	1934	2046	3980	2 Q	Park J-w (KOR); L 245–254	Did not advance	3rd place, bronze medalist(s)
Park Jong-woo	Masters	2031	1879	3910	3 Q	Koo S-h (KOR); W 254–245	MR Ismail (MAS); L 511–534	2nd place, silver medalist(s)
Park Jong-woo; Hong Hae-sol; Choi Bok-eum	Trios	1910	2036	3946	20	—N/a		
Kim Jong-wook; Koo Seong-hoi; Kang Hee-won	Trios	2120	2062	4182	6	—N/a		
Kim Jong-wook; Koo Seong-hoi; Kang Hee-won; Park Jong-woo; Hong Hae-sol; Choi Bok-eum	Team of six	4378	4162	8540	1st place, gold medalist(s)	—N/a		

Women

Athlete	Event	Block 1	Block 2	Total	Rank	Stepladder final 1	Stepladder final 2	Rank
Athlete	Event	Result	Result	Total	Rank	Opposition Result	Opposition Result	Rank
Lee Na-young	Masters	1923	1931	3854	2 Q	Lee Y-j (KOR); L 211–230	Did not advance	3rd place, bronze medalist(s)
Lee Yeon-ji	Masters	1946	1901	3847	3 Q	Lee N-y (KOR); W 230–211	M Ishimoto (JPN); L 473–481	2nd place, silver medalist(s)
Lee Yeon-ji; Ryu Seo-yeon; Lee Na-young	Trios	2053	2064	4117	5	—N/a		
Han Byul; Kim Hyun-mi; Baek Sung-ja	Trios	1842	2037	3879	11	—N/a		
Lee Yeon-ji; Ryu Seo-yeon; Lee Na-young; Han Byul; Kim Hyun-mi; Baek Sung-ja	Team of six	4091	4247	8338	1st place, gold medalist(s)	—N/a		

== Boxing ==
Men

Athlete	Event	Round of 32	Round of 16	Quarterfinals	Semifinals	Final	Rank
Athlete	Event	Opposition Result	Opposition Result	Opposition Result	Opposition Result	Opposition Result	Rank
Shin Jong-hun	–49 kg	E Kharkhuu (MGL); L 0–3	Did not advance				
Kim In-kyu	–52 kg	Bye	A Mahmetov (KAZ); L 1–4	Did not advance			
Lee Ye-chan	–56 kg	C Vilaysack (LAO); W 5–0	Xu BX (CHN); L 0–5	Did not advance			
Choi Hae-ju	–60 kg	Bye	F Papendang (INA); L 0–5	Did not advance			
Lim Hyun-suk	–64 kg	Bye	S Baloch (PAK); W 5–0	I Kholdarov (UZB); L 0–4	Did not advance		
Lim Hyun-chul	–69 kg	Bye	AM Azziz (SYR); W 5–0	BU Baturov (UZB); L 0–5	Did not advance		
Kim Jin-jea	–75 kg	Bye	BH Betaubun (INA); W 3–1	EF Marcial (PHI); L 0–5	Did not advance		

Women

Athlete	Event	Round of 32	Round of 16	Quarterfinals	Semifinals	Final	Rank
Athlete	Event	Opposition Result	Opposition Result	Opposition Result	Opposition Result	Opposition Result	Rank
Nam Eun-jin	–51 kg	Bye	Nguyễn TT (VIE); L 0–5	Did not advance			
Im Ae-ji	–57 kg	—N/a	Bye	Yin JH (CHN); L 0–5	Did not advance		
Oh Yeon-ji	–60 kg	—N/a	Lưu TD (VIE); W 5–0	Yang WL (CHN); W 3–2	Choe H-s (PRK); W 5–0	S Seesondee (THA); W 4–1	1st place, gold medalist(s)

== Canoeing ==
=== Slalom ===
Athlete	Event	Heats		Semifinal		Final	
Athlete	Event	Best	Rank	Time	Rank	Time	Rank
Bak Jae-hyeong	Men's C-1	116.92	14	Did not advance			
Kim Beom-soo	Men's C-1	100.29	11 Q	142.71	13 Q	120.14	7
Lee Dong-heon	Men's K-1	97.09	11 Q	107.81	11	Did not advance	
Song Min-hyeong	Men's K-1	91.82	8 Q	101.43	9 Q	148.63	8

=== Sprint ===
Athlete	Event	Heats		Semifinal		Final	
Athlete	Event	Time	Rank	Time	Rank	Time	Rank
Kim Gyu-myeong	Men's C-1 1000 m	—N/a				4:08.312	4
Choi Ji-sung; Kim Gyu-myeong	Men's C-2 200 m	41.811	4 QS	41.460	2 QF	40.860	8
Park Seung-jin; Choi Ji-sung	Men's C-2 1000 m	—N/a				3:56.083	5
Cho Gwang-hee	Men's K-1 200 m	36.249	2 QF	Bye		35.373	1st place, gold medalist(s)
Kim Ji-hwan; Park Ju-hyeon	Men's K-2 1000 m	3:45.828	4 QS	3:37.053	2 QF	3:37.127	7
Cho Gwang-hee; Cho Jeong-hyun; Choi Min-kyu; Kim Ji-won	Men's K-4 500 m	1:26.796	2 QF	Bye		1:25.313	2nd place, silver medalist(s)
Kim Yeo-jin	Women's C-1 200 m	1:01.185	5 QS	57.874	4	Did not advance	
Kim Guk-joo	Women's K-1 200 m	43.199	1 QF	Bye		43.545	6
Lee Sun-ja	Women's K-1 500 m	—N/a				2:02.532	3rd place, bronze medalist(s)
Choi Min-ji; Lee Sun-ja; Kim Guk-joo; Lee Ha-lin	Women's K-4 500 m	—N/a				1:39.092	4

Qualification legend: QF=Final; QS=Semifinal

== Cycling ==
=== BMX ===
Athlete	Event	Seeding run		Motos		Final	
Athlete	Event	Time	Rank	Point	Rank	Time	Rank
Cha Seung-ho	Men's race	43.80	12	18	6	Did not advance	
Kim Beom-jung	Men's race	38.35	11	17	6	Did not advance	

=== Mountain biking ===
Athlete	Event	Final	
Athlete	Event	Time	Rank
Kwon Soon-woo	Men's cross-country	1:42:03	10
Yoo Bum-jin	Men's cross-country	−2 laps	12

=== Road ===
Athlete	Event	Final	
Athlete	Event	Time	Rank
Choi Dong-hyeok	Men's road race	3:33:26	38
Jang Kyung-gu	Men's road race	3:25:52	6
Joo Dae-yeong	Men's road race	3:41:48	51
Seo Joon-yong	Men's road race	3:29:10	22
Lee Ju-mi	Women's road race	2:57:40	8
Na Ah-reum	Women's road race	2:55:47	1st place, gold medalist(s)
Choe Hyeong-min	Men's time trial	57:36.39	4
Na Ah-reum	Women's time trial	31:57.10	1st place, gold medalist(s)

=== Track ===
Sprint

Athlete	Event	Qualification		Round of 32	Round of 16	Quarterfinals	Semifinals	Final	
Athlete	Event	Time	Rank	Opposition Time	Opposition Time	Opposition Time	Opposition Time	Opposition Time	Rank
Im Chae-bin	Men's sprint	9.865 GR	1	Bye	E Alben (IND); W 11.212	P Vorzhev (KAZ); W 10.336	A Awang (MAS); L (FB)	SF Sahrom (MAS); W 10.559	3rd place, bronze medalist(s)
Seok Hye-yun	Men's sprint	10.297	12	Bye	A Awang (MAS); L	Did not advance			12
Cho Sun-young	Women's sprint	10.957	4	—N/a	AA Rosidi (MAS); W 11.491	J Lee (HKG); W 11.653	Lee WS (HKG); L (FB)	Zhong TS (CHN); W 11.393	3rd place, bronze medalist(s)
Lee Hye-jin	Women's sprint	10.815	2	—N/a	P Rasee (THA); W 12.878	CD Putri (INA); W 11.136	Zhong TS (CHN); W 11.760 (FA)	Lee WS (HKG); L	2nd place, silver medalist(s)

Team sprint

Athlete	Event	Qualification		Final	
Athlete	Event	Time	Rank	Opposition Time	Rank
Son Je-yong; Seok Hye-yun; Im Chae-bin; Oh Je-seok^{b}	Men's team sprint	44.224	3 FB	Japan (JPN); L	4
Kim Won-gyeong; Lee Hye-jin; Cho Sun-young^{[a]}	Women's team sprint	33.620	3 FB	Japan (JPN); W 33.476	3rd place, bronze medalist(s)

^{a} Riders who participated in the heats only and received medals.
^{b} Riders who entered the competition but did not participating in any phase of the team event.
Qualification legend: FA=Gold medal final; FB=Bronze medal final

Pursuit

Athlete	Event	Qualification		Round 1		Final	
Athlete	Event	Time	Rank	Opposition Time	Rank	Opposition Time	Rank
Park Sang-hoon	Men's pursuit	4:19.672 AR	1 FA	—N/a		R Chikatani (JPN); W	1st place, gold medalist(s)
Lee Ju-mi	Women's pursuit	3:33.048 AR	1 FA	—N/a		Wang H (CHN); W	1st place, gold medalist(s)
Im Jae-yeon; Shin Dong-in; Kim Ok-cheol; Min Kyeong-ho; Park Sang-hoon^{b}	Men's team pursuit	3:56.247 AR	1 Q	China (CHN); L DNF	8	Did not advance	
Kim You-ri; Na Ah-reum; Kim Hyun-ji; Lee Ju-mi; An Seo-jin^{b} Jang Su-ji^{b}	Women's team pursuit	4:24.796 AR	1 Q	Hong Kong (HKG); W 4:43.245	1 FA	China (CHN); W 4:23.652 AR	1st place, gold medalist(s)

^{a} Riders who participated in the heats only and received medals.
^{b} Riders who entered the competition but did not participating in any phase of the team event.
Qualification legend: FA=Gold medal final; FB=Bronze medal final

Keirin

Athlete	Event	1st Round	Repechage	2nd Round	Final
Athlete	Event	Rank	Rank	Rank	Rank
Im Chae-bin	Men's keirin	2 Q	Bye	2 FA	4
Oh Je-seok	Men's keirin	3 R	3 Q	4 FB	9
Cho Sun-young	Women's keirin	2 Q	Bye	3 FA	5
Lee Hye-jin	Women's keirin	1 Q	Bye	1 FA	2nd place, silver medalist(s)

Qualification legend: FA=Gold medal final; FB=Bronze medal final

Omnium

Athlete	Event	Scratch race		Tempo race		Elimination race		Points race		Total points	Rank
Athlete	Event	Rank	Points	Rank	Points	Rank	Points	Rank	Points	Total points	Rank
Shin Dong-in	Men's omnium	9	24	5	32	2	38	13	3	97	6
Kim You-ri	Women's omnium	4	34	3	36	3	36	6	15	121	3rd place, bronze medalist(s)

Madison

Athlete	Event	Points	Laps	Rank
Park Sang-hoon; Kim Ok-cheol	Men's madison	53	20	2nd place, silver medalist(s)
Kim You-ri; Na Ah-reum	Women's madison	76	40	1st place, gold medalist(s)

== Diving ==
Men

Athlete	Event	Preliminaries		Final	
Athlete	Event	Points	Rank	Points	Rank
Kim Yeong-nam	1 m springboard	394.00	4 Q	352.45	5
Woo Ha-ram	1 m springboard	406.05	3 Q	382.70	3rd place, bronze medalist(s)
Kim Yeong-nam	3 m springboard	386.35	7 Q	406.20	8
Woo Ha-ram	3 m springboard	445.10	3 Q	422.75	6
Kim Yeong-nam	10 m platform	454.80	4 Q	461.75	4
Woo Ha-ram	10 m platform	459.30	3 Q	477.55	3rd place, bronze medalist(s)
Kim Yeong-nam; Woo Ha-ram	3 m synchronized springboard	—N/a		412.74	2nd place, silver medalist(s)
Kim Yeong-nam; Woo Ha-ram	10 m synchronized platform	—N/a		406.05	2nd place, silver medalist(s)

Women

Athlete	Event	Preliminaries		Final	
Athlete	Event	Points	Rank	Points	Rank
Kim Na-mi	1 m springboard	237.15	6 Q	230.40	5
Kim Su-ji	1 m springboard	257.00	3 Q	265.35	3rd place, bronze medalist(s)
Kim Na-mi	3 m springboard	287.75	5 Q	291.80	7
Kim Su-ji	3 m springboard	266.40	8 Q	273.20	8
Cho Eun-bi	10 m platform	252.15	8 Q	280.80	8
Moon Na-yun	10 m platform	268.35	7 Q	300.20	6
Kim Su-ji; Kim Na-mi	3 m synchronized springboard	—N/a		268.74	4
Cho Eun-bi; Moon Na-yun	10 m synchronized platform	—N/a		278.13	5

== Equestrian ==
Dressage

Athlete	Horse	Event	Prix St-Georges		Intermediate I		Intermediate I Freestyle	
Athlete	Horse	Event	Score	Rank	Score	Rank	Score	Rank
Kim Chun-pil	Dr. Watson 8	Individual	64.940 #	20 Q	66.087	14	Did not advance	
Kim Hyeok	Degas K	Individual	71.235	2 Q	71.558	3 Q	75.705	3rd place, bronze medalist(s)
Kim Kyun-sub	Sonn En Schein	Individual	68.440	10 Q	68.676	6 Q	69.435	8
Nam Dong-heon	Release	Individual	65.646	18 Q	68.088	8	Did not advance	
Kim Chun-pil; Nam Dong-heon; Kim Kyun-sub; Kim Hyeok	See above	Team	68.440	2nd place, silver medalist(s)	—N/a			

Eventing

Athlete	Horse	Event	Dressage		Cross-country			Jumping		
Athlete	Horse	Event	Penalties	Rank	Penalties	Total	Rank	Penalties	Total	Rank
Hong Won-jae	Creator GS	Individual	34.20 #	24	33.60	67.80	21 Q	8.00	75.80	18
Kim Seok	Cloud Nine 4	Individual	30.20	10	Eliminated			Did not advance		
Kim Sung-soo	Nexxus	Individual	31.30	11	49.20	80.50	22 Q	Withdrew		
Song Sang-wuk	Carl M	Individual	34.00	22	0.00	34.00	10 Q	0.00	34.00	8
Kim Seok; Kim Sung-soo; Song Sang-wuk; Hong Won-jae	See above	Team	95.50	5		182.30	5		1,109.80	6

Jumping

Athlete	Horse	Event	Qualification		Qualifier 1			Qualifier 2 Team Final			Final round A			Final round B		
Athlete	Horse	Event	Points	Rank	Penalties	Total	Rank	Penalties	Total	Rank	Penalties	Total	Rank	Penalties	Total	Rank
Kim Seok	Lacord	Individual	4.18	13	0	4.18	8 Q	4	8.18	13 Q	10	18.18	17 Q	4	22.18	14
Lee Yo-seb	Quitefire	Individual	13.01 #	51	13 #	26.01	49 Q	Retired			Did not advance					
Oh Sung-hwan	Chintan	Individual	6.64	29	5	11.64	22 Q	12	23.64	30 Q	19	42.64	34	Did not advance		
Sohn Bong-gak	Lex' Stakkaro	Individual	5.57	24	8	13.57	27 Q	12	25.57	32 Q	13	38.57	31 Q	Retired		
Lee Yo-seb; Kim Seok; Sohn Bong-gak; Oh Sung-hwan	See above	Team	16.39	7	13	29.39	7 Q	28	57.39	8	—N/a					

1. – indicates that the score of this rider does not count in the team competition, since only the best three results of a team are counted.

== Esports (demonstration) ==
StarCraft II

Athlete	ID	Event	Quarterfinals	Semifinals	Final / BM	
Athlete	ID	Event	Opposition Score	Opposition Score	Opposition Score	Rank
Cho Seong-ju	Maru	StarCraft II	Thailand; W 3–0	Iran; W 3–0	Chinese Taipei; W 4–0	1st place, gold medalist(s)

League of Legends

Athlete	ID	Event	Group stage		Semifinals	Final / BM	
Athlete	ID	Event	Oppositions Scores	Rank	Opposition Score	Opposition Score	Rank
Kim Ki-in; Go Dong-bin; Lee Sang-hyeok; Park Jae-hyuk; Jo Yong-in; Han Wang-ho	Kiin; Score; Faker; Ruler; CoreJJ; Peanut	League of Legends	China: W 2–0; Kazakhstan: W 2–0; Vietnam: W 2–0	1 Q	Saudi Arabia; W 2–0	China; L 1–3	2nd place, silver medalist(s)

== Fencing ==
Individual

Athlete	Event	Preliminary		Round of 32	Round of 16	Quarterfinals	Semifinals	Final	
Athlete	Event	Opposition Score	Rank	Opposition Score	Opposition Score	Opposition Score	Opposition Score	Opposition Score	Rank
Jung Jin-sun	Men's épée	F Alimov (UZB): W 5–2; MR Mohamed (MAS): W 5–0; A Al-Shatti (KUW): DNS; Lan MH (CHN): W 5–4; M Al-Shamari (QAT): L 4–5; NA Bhatti (PAK): W 5–1	2 Q	Bye	F Alimov (UZB); W 15–10	R Kurbanov (KAZ); W 15–14	D Alexanin (KAZ); L 12–15	Did not advance	3rd place, bronze medalist(s)
Park Sang-young	Men's épée	A Al-Hammadi (UAE): L 4–5; Vag-Urminsky (CAM): W 5–3; E Dulguun (MGL): W 5–4; Juengamnuaychai (THA): W 5–2; Shi GF (CHN): L 2–5; MR Tadi (IRI): W 5–4	2 Q	D Siahaan (INA); W 15–0	Ho WH (HKG); W 15–8	Shi GF (CHN); W 15–0	K Kano (JPN); W 15–11	D Alexanin (KAZ); L 12–15	2nd place, silver medalist(s)
Ha Tae-gyu	Men's foil	S Doungpatra (THA): L 1–5; KJ Chan (SGP): W 5–2; Chen C-c (TPE): W 5–2; BW Louie (PHI): W 5–3; Ma JF (CHN): W 5–1	1 Q	Bye	Nguyễn MQ (VIE); W 15–5	N Choi (HKG); L 11–15	Did not advance		7
Son Young-ki	Men's foil	M Zulfikar (INA): W 5–2; A Owaida (QAT): W 5–1; S Lama (NEP): W 5–1; T Saito (JPN): W 5–1; H Yoong (MAS): W 5–4	1 Q	Bye	JI Lim (SGP); W 15–6	Ou F-m (TPE); W 15–8	Huang MK (CHN); L 6–15	Did not advance	3rd place, bronze medalist(s)
Gu Bon-gil	Men's sabre	Kitsiriboon (THA): W 5–1; A Al-Hammadi (UAE): W 5–0; K Tokunan (JPN): W 5–0; N Karim (KAZ): W 5–0	1 Q	Bye	N Karim (KAZ); W 15–4	M Abedini (IRI); W 15–12	Low HT (HKG); W 15–4	Oh S-u (KOR); W 15–14	1st place, gold medalist(s)
Oh Sang-uk	Men's sabre	Wang S (CHN): W 5–2; H Budianto (INA): W 5–2; V Srinualnad (THA): W 5–2; I Mokretsov (KAZ): W 5–0	1 Q	Bye	K Yoshida (JPN); W 15–7	K Tokunan (JPN); W 15–4	A Pakdaman (IRI); W 15–14	Gu B-g (KOR); L 14–15	2nd place, silver medalist(s)
Choi In-jeong	Women's épée	H Abella (PHI): W 5–4; J Dutta (IND): W 5–3; D Tannous (LBN): L 3–5; Baatarchuluun (MGL): L 3–5; U Balaganskaya (KAZ): W 5–2	3 Q	Trần TTT (VIE); W 15–7	Zhu MY (CHN); W 15–14	K Hsieh (HKG); W 12–11	Sun YW (CHN); L 10–11	Did not advance	3rd place, bronze medalist(s)
Kang Young-mi	Women's épée	N Salameh (LBN): W 5–2; Megawati (INA): W 5–4; K Oishi (JPN): W 4–3; JS Singh (IND): W 5–2; Trần TTT (VIE): W 5–2	1 Q	Bye	VA Lim (SGP); W 15–8	K Oishi (JPN); W 15–8	V Kong (HKG); W 13–12	Sun YW (CHN); W 11–7	1st place, gold medalist(s)
Jeon Hee-sook	Women's foil	N Aini (INA): W 5–0; Liu YW (HKG): W 5–1; M Shaito (LBN): L 0–5; L Al-Hosani (UAE): W 5–0; Cheng H (TPE): W 3–2; Ho PI (MAC): W 5–0	1 Q	Bye	Nam H-h (KOR); W 13–8	M Wong (SGP); W 15–7	S Azuma (JPN); W 15–9	Fu YT (CHN); W 8–3	1st place, gold medalist(s)
Nam Hyun-hee	Women's foil	K Cheung (HKG): W 5–3; Yang C-m (TPE): W 5–4; K Siribrahmanakul (THA): W 5–0; M Wong (SGP): L 1–5; Đỗ TA (VIE): L 0–5	4 Q	M Ananda (INA); W 15–12	Jeon H-s (KOR); L 8–13	Did not advance			14
Kim Ji-yeon	Women's sabre	G Novitha (INA): W 5–3; T Pokeaw (THA): W 5–2; N Sazanjian (IRI): W 5–4; T Pochekutova (KAZ): W 5–3	1 Q	Bye	Au SY (HKG); W 15–10	K Chang (HKG); W 15–4	Qian JR (CHN); L 13–15	Did not advance	3rd place, bronze medalist(s)
Yoon Ji-su	Women's sabre	FR Delcheh (IRI): W 5–1; C Linly (CAM): W 5–0; R Thapa (NEP): W 5–0; D Permatasari (INA): W 5–3; S Fukushima (JPN): L 1–5	2 Q	Bye	S Aigerim (KAZ); W 15–10	N Tamura (JPN); L 13–15	Did not advance		6

Team

Athlete	Event	Round of 16	Quarterfinals	Semifinals	Final	
Athlete	Event	Opposition Score	Opposition Score	Opposition Score	Opposition Score	Rank
Jung Jin-sun; Kweon Young-jun; Park Kyoung-doo; Park Sang-young	Men's épée	Bye	Iran (IRI); W 45–26	China (CHN); L 41–45	Did not advance	3rd place, bronze medalist(s)
Ha Tae-gyu; Hep Jun; Lee Kwang-hyun; Son Young-ki	Men's foil	Bye	Philippines (PHI); W 45–19	China (CHN); W 45–43	Hong Kong (HKG); W 45–37	1st place, gold medalist(s)
Gu Bon-gil; Kim Jun-ho; Kim Jung-hwan; Oh Sang-uk	Men's sabre	Bye	Kazakhstan (KAZ); W 45–17	Hong Kong (HKG); W 45–20	Iran (IRI); W 45–32	1st place, gold medalist(s)
Choi In-jeong; Kang Young-mi; Lee Hye-in; Shin A-lam	Women's épée	Bye	Vietnam (VIE); W 45–28	Japan (JPN); W 45–33	China (CHN); L 28–29	2nd place, silver medalist(s)
Chae Song-oh; Hong Seo-in; Jeon Hee-sook; Nam Hyun-hee	Women's foil	Bye	Hong Kong (HKG); W 45–32	Japan (JPN); L 36–45	Did not advance	3rd place, bronze medalist(s)
Choi Soo-yeon; Hwang Seon-a; Kim Ji-yeon; Yoon Ji-su	Women's sabre	Bye	Iran (IRI); W 45–23	Japan (JPN); W 45–25	China (CHN); W 45–36	1st place, gold medalist(s)

== Field hockey ==
Team	Event	Group Stage						Semifinals	Final / BM / Pl.	
Team	Event	Opposition Score	Opposition Score	Opposition Score	Opposition Score	Opposition Score	Rank	Opposition Score	Opposition Score	Rank
South Korea men's	Men's tournament	Hong Kong; W 11–0	Sri Lanka; W 8–0	Indonesia; W 15–0	India; L 3–5	Japan; L 2–3	3	Did not advance	Bangladesh; W 7–0	5
South Korea women's	Women's tournament	—N/a	Indonesia; W 5–0	Thailand; W 3–0	India; L 1–4	Kazakhstan; W 8–0	2 Q	Japan; L 0–2	China; L 1–2	4

=== Men's tournament ===
Team roster

The following is the South Korea roster in the men's field hockey tournament of the 2018 Asian Games.

Head coach: (South Korea) Kim Young-kyu

1. Hong Doo-pyo (GK)
3. Lee Se-yong (GK)
5. Rim Jin-kang
6. Yang Ji-hun
7. Jung Man-jae (C)
8. Hwang Weon-ki
9. Hwang Tae-il
10. Kim Jung-hoo
11. Lee Jung-jun
13. Seo In-woo
16. Bae Jong-suk
19. Jeong Jun-woo
22. Kim Seong-kyu
23. Kim Hyeong-jin
25. Kim Sung-yeob
27. Lee Dae-yeol
30. Jang Jong-hyun
32. Kim Ki-hoon

Pool A

Pos	Team	Pld	W	D	L	PF	PA	PD	Pts	Qualification
1	India	5	5	0	0	76	3	+73	15	Semi-finals
2	Japan	5	4	0	1	30	11	+19	12	Semi-finals
3	South Korea	5	3	0	2	39	8	+31	9	Fifth place game
4	Sri Lanka	5	2	0	3	7	41	−34	6	Seventh place game
5	Indonesia (H)	5	1	0	4	5	40	−35	3	Ninth place game
6	Hong Kong	5	0	0	5	3	57	−54	0	Eleventh place game

Source: FIH
Rules for classification: 1) points; 2) goal difference; 3) goals scored; 4) head-to-head result.
(H) Hosts

20 August 2018
10:00

South Korea	11–0	Hong Kong
Jeong 4', 26', 34'; Jang 13', 21', 33', 54'; Seo 20'; Kim Se. 39'; Yang 57'; Kim J. 60'	Report

Umpires:
Saleh Al-Balushi (OMA)
Rawi Anbananthan (MAS)

22 August 2018
12:00

South Korea	8–0	Sri Lanka
Kim Se. 5'; Kim J. 7'; Hwang W. 9'; Bae J. 14'; Jang 32', 42', 44'; Hwang T. 52'	Report

Umpires:
You Suolong (CHN)
Saleh Al-Balushi (OMA)

24 August 2018
14:00

Indonesia	0–15	South Korea
	Report	Kim J-h 9', 35', 56'; Jang J 9', 30', 45'; Jung M 20', 46', 59'; Seo I 25', 58', 59'; Rim J 49'; Yang J 54'; Kim S-k 56'

Umpires:
Narongtuch Subboonsung (THA)
Hafiz Atif Latif (PAK)

26 August 2018
18:00

South Korea	3–5	India
Jung M-j 33', 35'; Jang J-h 60'	Report	Rupinder 1'; Chinglensana 5'; Lalit 16'; Manpreet 49'; Akashdeep 56'

Umpires:
Rawi Anbananthan (MAS)
Gareth Greenfield (NZL)

28 August 2018
20:00

Japan	3–2	South Korea
Murata 28', 46', 49'	Report	Kim J 39'; Jang 48'

Umpires:
Rawi Anbananthan (MAS)
Gus Soteriades (USA)

5th place match

1 September 2018
15:00

South Korea	7–0	Bangladesh
Kim J 10'; Seo 15'; Jeong J 26'; Jang 27', 44'; Jung 33'; Lee 57'	Report

Umpires:
Rawi Anbananthan (MAS)
You Suolong (CHN)

=== Women's tournament ===
Team roster

The following is the South Korea roster in the women's field hockey tournament of the 2018 Asian Games.

Head coach: (South Korea) Huh Sang-young

1. Jang Soo-ji (GK)
2. Choi Su-ji
4. Kim Young-ran (C)
5. Lee Yu-rim
8. An Hyo-ju
10. Park Mi-hyun
11. Park Seung-a
12. Lee Young-sil
13. Cho Eun-ji
14. Cho Yun-kyoung
16. Cheon Seul-ki
17. Kim Ok-ju
18. Kim Bo-mi
19. Cho Hye-jin
21. Shin Hye-jeong
22. Jang Hee-sun
23. Lee Yu-ri
31. Hwang Hyeon-a (GK)

Pool B

Pos	Team	Pld	W	D	L	PF	PA	PD	Pts	Qualification
1	India	4	4	0	0	38	1	+37	12	Semifinals
2	South Korea	4	3	0	1	17	4	+13	9	Semifinals
3	Thailand	4	1	0	3	3	11	−8	3	5th place game
4	Indonesia (H)	4	1	0	3	2	16	−14	3	7th place game
5	Kazakhstan	4	1	0	3	4	32	−28	3	9th place game

Source: FIH
Rules for classification: 1) points; 2) goal difference; 3) goals scored; 4) head-to-head result.
(H) Hosts

21 August 2018
18:00

South Korea	5–0	Indonesia
Kim B. 8'; Cho E. 17'; Cheon 22'; Lee Yu-rim 53'; Lee Yo. 57'	Report

Umpires:
Nur Hafizah Azman (MAS)
Chen Jianjun (CHN)

23 August 2018
20:00

Thailand	0–3	South Korea
	Report	Park M 6'; Kim O 52'; Park S 54'

Umpires:
Liu Xiaoying (CHN)
Nur Hafizah Azman (MAS)

25 August 2018
20:00

India	4–1	South Korea
N. Kaur 16'; G. Kaur 54', 55'; Katariya 56'	Report	Lee Y. 21'

Umpires:
Liu Xiaoying (CHN)
Ayanna McClean (TTO)

27 August 2018
16:00

South Korea	8–0	Kazakhstan
Park S 9', 10', 30'; Cho 33'; Lee Yo. 36'; Cheon 40', 47'; Kim O 58'	Report

Umpires:
Chieko Soma (JPN)
Chen Jianjun (CHN)

Semifinal

29 August 2018
17:30

Japan	2–0	South Korea
Ota 49'; Shimizu 60'	Report

Umpires:
Kelly Hudson (NZL)
Chen Jianjun (CHN)

Bronze medal match

31 August 2018
17:30

South Korea	1–2	China
Kim O-j 60'	Report	Gu 20'; Song 58'

Umpires:
Ayanna McClean (TTO)
Suzi Sutton (USA)

== Football ==
South Korea men's team were drawn in Group E at the Games, while the women's team in Group A.

Team	Event	Group Stage				Round of 16	Quarterfinals	Semifinals	Final / BM	
Team	Event	Opposition Score	Opposition Score	Opposition Score	Rank	Opposition Score	Opposition Score	Opposition Score	Opposition Score	Rank
South Korea men's	Men's tournament	Bahrain; W 6–0	Malaysia; L 1–2	Kyrgyzstan; W 1–0	2 Q	Iran; W 2–0	Uzbekistan; W 4–3	Vietnam; W 3–1	Japan; W 2–1	1st place, gold medalist(s)
South Korea women's	Women's tournament	Chinese Taipei; W 2–1	Maldives; W 8–0	Indonesia; W 12–0	1 Q	—N/a	Hong Kong; W 5–0	Japan; L 1–2	Chinese Taipei; W 4–0	3rd place, bronze medalist(s)

=== Men's tournament ===
Roster

The following is the South Korea squad in the men's football tournament of the 2018 Asian Games. The team of 20 players was officially named on 16 July.

Head coach: (South Korea) Kim Hak-bum

No.	Pos.	Player	Date of birth (age)	Caps	Goals	Club
1	GK	Song Bum-keun	15 October 1997 (aged 20)	3	0	(Korea Football Association) Jeonbuk Hyundai Motors
18	GK	Jo Hyeon-woo*	25 September 1991 (aged 26)	2	0	(Korea Football Association) Daegu FC
2	DF	Hwang Hyun-soo	22 July 1995 (aged 23)	7	1	(Korea Football Association) FC Seoul
3	DF	Kim Min-jae	15 November 1996 (aged 21)	2	0	(Korea Football Association) Jeonbuk Hyundai Motors
4	DF	Kim Jin-ya	30 June 1998 (aged 20)	2	0	(Korea Football Association) Incheon United
5	DF	Jeong Tae-wook	16 May 1997 (aged 21)	3	1	(Korea Football Association) Jeju United
6	DF	Kim Moon-hwan	1 August 1995 (aged 23)	6	0	(Korea Football Association) Busan IPark
12	DF	Lee Si-young	21 April 1997 (aged 21)	1	0	(Korea Football Association) Seongnam FC
8	MF	Lee Jin-hyun	26 August 1997 (aged 20)	4	0	(Korea Football Association) Pohang Steelers
10	MF	Hwang In-beom	20 September 1996 (aged 21)	4	2	(Korea Football Association) Asan Mugunghwa
13	MF	Cho Yu-min	17 November 1996 (aged 21)	5	0	(Korea Football Association) Suwon FC
14	MF	Jang Yun-ho (vice-captain)	25 August 1996 (aged 21)	6	0	(Korea Football Association) Jeonbuk Hyundai Motors
15	MF	Lee Seung-mo	30 March 1998 (aged 20)	2	0	(Korea Football Association) Gwangju FC
19	MF	Kim Geon-ung	29 August 1997 (aged 20)	1	0	(Korea Football Association) Ulsan Hyundai
20	MF	Kim Jung-min	13 November 1999 (aged 18)	1	0	(Austrian Football Association) FC Liefering
7	FW	Son Heung-min* (captain)	8 July 1992 (aged 26)	4	2	(The Football Association) Tottenham Hotspur
9	FW	Hwang Hee-chan	26 January 1996 (aged 22)	16	2	(Austrian Football Association) Red Bull Salzburg
11	FW	Na Sang-ho	12 August 1996 (aged 21)	1	0	(Korea Football Association) Gwangju FC
16	FW	Hwang Ui-jo*	28 August 1992 (aged 25)	15	5	(Japan Football Association) Gamba Osaka
17	FW	Lee Seung-woo	6 January 1998 (aged 20)	0	0	(Italian Football Federation) Hellas Verona

* Over-aged player.

Group E

Pos	Team	Pld	W	D	L	GF	GA	GD	Pts	Qualification
1	Malaysia	3	2	0	1	7	5	+2	6 (Note: Head-to-head result: Malaysia 2–1 South Korea.)	Advance to knockout stage
2	South Korea	3	2	0	1	8	2	+6	6	Advance to knockout stage
3	Bahrain	3	1	1	1	5	10	−5	4	Advance to knockout stage
4	Kyrgyzstan	3	0	1	2	3	6	−3	1	
5	United Arab Emirates	0	0	0	0	0	0	0	0	Redrawn to Group C

Source: Asian Games 2018
Rules for classification: Group stage tiebreakers
Notes:
15 August 2018
19:00 UTC+7

South Korea	6–0	Bahrain
Hwang Ui-jo 17', 36', 43'; Kim Jin-ya 23'; Na Sang-ho 41'; Hwang Hee-chan 90+3'	Report

Jalak Harupat Stadium, Soreang
Referee: Takuto Okabe (Japan)

17 August 2018
19:00 UTC+7

Malaysia	2–1	South Korea
Safawi 5', 45+1'	Report	Hwang Ui-jo 87'

Jalak Harupat Stadium, Soreang
Referee: Mohammed Al-Hoaish (Saudi Arabia)

20 August 2018
19:00 UTC+7

South Korea	1–0	Kyrgyzstan
Son Heung-min 63'	Report

Jalak Harupat Stadium, Soreang
Referee: Masoud Tufaylieh (Syria)

Round of 16

23 August 2018
19:30 UTC+7

Iran	0–2	South Korea
	Report	Hwang Ui-jo 40'; Lee Seung-woo 55'

Wibawa Mukti Stadium, Cikarang
Referee: Ahmad Yaqoub Ibrahim (Jordan)

Quarterfinal

27 August 2018
16:00 UTC+7

Uzbekistan	3–4 (a.e.t.)	South Korea
Masharipov 17'; Alibaev 53', 55'	Report	Hwang Ui-jo 4', 34', 75'; Hwang Hee-chan 118' (pen.)

Patriot Candrabhaga Stadium, Bekasi
Referee: Mohammed Al-Hoaish (Saudi Arabia)

Semifinal

29 August 2018
16:00 UTC+7

Vietnam	1–3	South Korea
Trần Minh Vương 70'	Report	Lee Seung-woo 7', 55'; Hwang Ui-jo 28'

Pakansari Stadium, Cibinong
Referee: Masoud Tufaylieh (Syria)

Final

1 September 2018
18:30 UTC+7

South Korea	2–1 (a.e.t.)	Japan
Lee Seung-woo 93'; Hwang Hee-chan 101'	Report	Ueda 115'

Pakansari Stadium, Cibinong
Referee: Aziz Asimov (Uzbekistan)

=== Women's tournament ===
Roster

The following is the South Korea squad in the women's football tournament of the 2018 Asian Games. The team of 20 players was officially named on 19 July.

Head coach: (South Korea) Yoon Deok-yeo

No.	Pos.	Player	Date of birth (age)	Caps	Goals	Club
1	GK	Yoon Young-geul	28 October 1987 (aged 30)	9	0	(Korea Football Association) Gyeongju KHNP
18	GK	Jung Bo-ram	22 July 1991 (aged 27)	2	0	(Korea Football Association) Hwacheon KSPO
2	DF	Jang Sel-gi	31 May 1994 (aged 24)	42	9	(Korea Football Association) Incheon Hyundai Steel Red Angels
3	DF	Shin Dam-yeong	2 October 1993 (aged 24)	28	1	(Korea Football Association) Suwon FMC
4	DF	Shim Seo-yeon	15 April 1989 (aged 29)	54	0	(Korea Football Association) Incheon Hyundai Steel Red Angels
5	DF	Hong Hye-ji	25 August 1996 (aged 21)	11	1	(Korea Football Association) Changnyeong
6	DF	Lim Seon-joo	27 November 1990 (aged 27)	65	4	(Korea Football Association) Incheon Hyundai Steel Red Angels
19	DF	Lee Eun-mi	18 August 1988 (aged 29)	79	13	(Korea Football Association) Suwon FMC
20	DF	Kim Hye-ri	25 June 1990 (aged 28)	73	1	(Korea Football Association) Incheon Hyundai Steel Red Angels
7	MF	Lee Min-a	8 November 1991 (aged 26)	45	11	(Japan Football Association) INAC Kobe Leonessa
8	MF	Cho So-hyun	24 June 1988 (aged 30)	112	20	(Norwegian Football Federation) Avaldsnes IL
10	MF	Ji So-yun	21 February 1991 (aged 27)	103	45	(The Football Association) Chelsea
12	MF	Moon Mi-ra	28 February 1992 (aged 26)	11	3	(Korea Football Association) Suwon FMC
15	MF	Jang Chang	21 June 1996 (aged 22)	7	0	(Korea Football Association) Korea University
9	FW	Jeon Ga-eul	14 September 1988 (aged 29)	91	35	(Korea Football Association) Hwacheon KSPO
11	FW	Lee Geum-min	7 April 1994 (aged 24)	37	12	(Korea Football Association) Gyeongju KHNP
13	FW	Han Chae-rin	2 September 1996 (aged 21)	11	3	(Korea Football Association) Incheon Hyundai Steel Red Angels
14	FW	Choe Yu-ri	16 September 1994 (aged 23)	23	4	(Korea Football Association) Gumi Sportstoto
16	FW	Son Hwa-yeon	15 March 1997 (aged 21)	8	2	(Korea Football Association) Changnyeong
17	FW	Lee Hyun-young	16 February 1991 (aged 27)	14	5	(Korea Football Association) Suwon FMC

Group A

Pos	Team	Pld	W	D	L	GF	GA	GD	Pts	Qualification
1	South Korea	3	3	0	0	22	1	+21	9	Advance to Knockout stage
2	Chinese Taipei	3	2	0	1	12	2	+10	6	Advance to Knockout stage
3	Indonesia (H)	3	1	0	2	6	16	−10	3	
4	Maldives	3	0	0	3	0	21	−21	0	

Source: Asian Games 2018
Rules for classification: Group stage tiebreakers
(H) Hosts
16 August 2018
15:00 UTC+7

South Korea	2–1	Chinese Taipei
Jeon Ga-eul 8'; Jang Sel-gi 53'	Report	Yu Hsiu-chin 74'

Gelora Sriwijaya Stadium, Palembang
Referee: Rebecca Durcau (Australia)

19 August 2018
15:00 UTC+7

Maldives	0–8	South Korea
	Report	Ji So-yun 25' (pen.); Shamila 35' (o.g.); Son Hwa-yeon 35', 60', 87'; Moon Mi-ra 45', 54' (pen.); Lee Eun-mi 88'

Gelora Sriwijaya Stadium, Palembang
Referee: Law Bik Chi (Hong Kong)

21 August 2018
18:30 UTC+7

Indonesia	0–12	South Korea
	Report	Lee Hyun-young 4' (pen.), 38', 47', 71', 90'; Moon Mi-ra 11', 37'; Lim Seon-joo 14'; Son Hwa-yeon 48'; Jang Sel-gi 67'; Ji So-yun 88', 90+2'

Gelora Sriwijaya Stadium, Palembang
Referee: Mahsa Ghorbani (Iran)

Quarterfinal

24 August 2018
16:00 UTC+7

South Korea	5–0	Hong Kong
Jeon Ga-eul 20', 32'; Lee Geum-min 34'; Moon Mi-ra 79'; Lee Min-a 82'	Report

Gelora Sriwijaya Stadium, Palembang
Referee: Asaka Matsushita (Japan)

Semifinal

28 August 2018
16:00 UTC+7

South Korea	1–2	Japan
Lee Min-a 68'	Report	Sugasawa 5'; Lim Seon-joo 86' (o.g.)

Gelora Sriwijaya Stadium, Palembang
Referee: Law Bik Chi (Hong Kong)

Bronze medal match

31 August 2018
15:00 UTC+7

South Korea	4–0	Chinese Taipei
Ji So-yun 18'; Lee Geum-min 31'; Lee Min-a 77'; Moon Mi-ra 90'	Report

Gelora Sriwijaya Stadium, Palembang
Referee: Asaka Matsushita (Japan)

== Golf ==
Men

Athlete	Event	Round 1	Round 2	Round 3	Round 4	Total		
Athlete	Event	Score	Score	Score	Score	Score	Par	Rank
Choi Ho-young	Individual	69	68	75	73	285	−3	10
Jang Seung-bo	Individual	73	71	72	75	291	+3	26
Kim Dong-min	Individual	75	73	69	72	289	+1	23
Oh Seung-taek	Individual	72	70	67	69	278	−10	2nd place, silver medalist(s)
Choi Ho-young; Jang Seung-bo; Kim Dong-min; Oh Seung-taek	Team	214	209	208	214	845	−19	3rd place, bronze medalist(s)

Women

Athlete	Event	Round 1	Round 2	Round 3	Round 4	Total		
Athlete	Event	Score	Score	Score	Score	Score	Par	Rank
Ryu Hae-ran	Individual	71	72	71	66	280	−8	5
Lim Hee-jeong	Individual	71	68	71	71	281	−7	7
Jeong Yun-ji	Individual	74	74	67	74	289	+1	15
Ryu Hae-ran; Lim Hee-jeong; Jeong Yun-ji	Team	142	140	138	137	557	−19	2nd place, silver medalist(s)

== Handball ==
South Korea men's team were drawn in group B, while the women's team in group A. The women's team was a champion in the last edition in 2014 Incheon.

Key:

- ET – After extra time
- P – Match decided by penalty-shootout.

Team	Event	Preliminary		Main / Classification		Semifinals / Pl.	Final / BM / Pl.	
Team	Event	Oppositions Scores	Rank	Oppositions Scores	Rank	Opposition Score	Opposition Score	Rank
South Korea men's	Men's tournament	Pakistan: W 47–16; Japan: D 26–26	1 Q	Hong Kong: W 40–15; Bahrain: L 25–27; Iran: W 34–28	2 Q	Qatar; L 20–27	Japan; W 24–23	3rd place, bronze medalist(s)
South Korea women's	Women's tournament	North Korea: W 39–22; India: W 45–18; China: W 33–24; Kazakhstan: W 34–22	1 Q	—N/a		Thailand; W 40–13	China; W 29–23	1st place, gold medalist(s)

=== Men's tournament ===
Team roster
- Jeong Yi-kyeong
- Sim Jae-bok
- Choi Beom-mun
- Jung Su-young
- Park Jung-geu
- Jo Tae-hun
- Jang Dong-hyun
- Lee Hyeon-sik
- Yoon Ci-yoel
- Na Seung-do
- Hwang Do-yeop
- Kim Dong-cheol
- Jeong Jae-wan
- Lee Dong-myung
- Ku Chang-eun
- Lee Chang-woo

Preliminary round – Group B

Pos	Team	Pld	W	D	L	GF	GA	GD	Pts	Qualification
1	South Korea	2	1	1	0	73	42	+31	3 (Note: Head-to-head result: KOR 26–26 JPN. Overall goal difference was used as the tiebreaker.)	Main round / Group 1–2
2	Japan	2	1	1	0	64	41	+23	3	Main round / Group 1–2
3	Pakistan	2	0	0	2	31	85	−54	0	Main round / Group 3

Source: AHF
Notes:

13 August; 18:00	Pakistan	16–47	South Korea	POPKI Sports Hall, Jakarta; Referees: Li, Ke (CHN)
13 August; 18:00	Saeed 6	(4–26)	Hwang 11	POPKI Sports Hall, Jakarta; Referees: Li, Ke (CHN)
13 August; 18:00	1× (yellow card) 3× (suspension)		1× (yellow card)	POPKI Sports Hall, Jakarta; Referees: Li, Ke (CHN)

17 August; 9:00	South Korea	26–26	Japan	POPKI Sports Hall, Jakarta; Referees: Al-Marhoon, Al-Mawt (BHR)
17 August; 9:00	Kim 10	(13–13)	Motoki, Agarie 6	POPKI Sports Hall, Jakarta; Referees: Al-Marhoon, Al-Mawt (BHR)
17 August; 9:00	3× (yellow card) 5× (suspension)		3× (yellow card) 5× (suspension)	POPKI Sports Hall, Jakarta; Referees: Al-Marhoon, Al-Mawt (BHR)

Main round – Group II

Pos	Team	Pld	W	D	L	GF	GA	GD	Pts	Qualification
1	Bahrain	3	3	0	0	99	67	+32	6	Semifinals
2	South Korea	3	2	0	1	99	70	+29	4	Semifinals
3	Iran	3	1	0	2	97	83	+14	2	Classification 5th–6th
4	Hong Kong	3	0	0	3	54	129	−75	0	Classification 7th–8th

Source: AHF

20 August; 18:00	Hong Kong	15–40	South Korea	POPKI Sports Hall, Jakarta; Referees: Al-Saqer, Al-Suqufi (KSA)
20 August; 18:00	Tse 4	(7–21)	Jang, Hwang 7	POPKI Sports Hall, Jakarta; Referees: Al-Saqer, Al-Suqufi (KSA)
20 August; 18:00	3× (yellow card) 1× (suspension)		1× (yellow card)	POPKI Sports Hall, Jakarta; Referees: Al-Saqer, Al-Suqufi (KSA)

22 August; 14:00	South Korea	25–27	Bahrain	POPKI Sports Hall, Jakarta; Referees: Hizaki, Ikebuchi (JPN)
22 August; 14:00	Yoon 7	(11–13)	Al-Sayyad 8	POPKI Sports Hall, Jakarta; Referees: Hizaki, Ikebuchi (JPN)
22 August; 14:00	1× (yellow card) 6× (suspension) 1× (red card)		3× (yellow card) 6× (suspension)	POPKI Sports Hall, Jakarta; Referees: Hizaki, Ikebuchi (JPN)

24 August; 18:00	Iran	28–34	South Korea	POPKI Sports Hall, Jakarta; Referees: Hizaki, Ikebuchi (JPN)
24 August; 18:00	Nosrati 10	(12–17)	Jeong Y. 9	POPKI Sports Hall, Jakarta; Referees: Hizaki, Ikebuchi (JPN)
24 August; 18:00	3× (yellow card) 2× (suspension)		2× (yellow card) 3× (suspension)	POPKI Sports Hall, Jakarta; Referees: Hizaki, Ikebuchi (JPN)

Semifinal

27 August; 14:00	Qatar	27–20	South Korea	POPKI Sports Hall, Jakarta; Referees: Shakir, Kadhim (IRQ)
27 August; 14:00	Madadi 6	(13–7)	Lee H. 7	POPKI Sports Hall, Jakarta; Referees: Shakir, Kadhim (IRQ)
27 August; 14:00	4× (yellow card) 2× (suspension)		1× (yellow card) 3× (suspension)	POPKI Sports Hall, Jakarta; Referees: Shakir, Kadhim (IRQ)

Bronze medal match

31 August; 16:00	South Korea	24–23	Japan	POPKI Sports Hall, Jakarta; Referees: Al-Marhoon, Al-Mawt (BHR)
31 August; 16:00	Hwang 6	(13–12)	Watanabe, Agarie 5	POPKI Sports Hall, Jakarta; Referees: Al-Marhoon, Al-Mawt (BHR)
31 August; 16:00	3× (yellow card)		3× (yellow card) 2× (suspension)	POPKI Sports Hall, Jakarta; Referees: Al-Marhoon, Al-Mawt (BHR)

=== Women's tournament ===
Team roster
- Park Sae-young
- Kim Seon-hwa
- Song Hai-rim
- Shin Eun-joo
- Kim On-a
- Park Mi-ra
- Yoo Hyun-ji
- Kang Eun-hye
- Choi Su-min
- Han Mi-seul
- Jung Ji-hae
- Gim Bo-eun
- Song Ji-eun
- Lee Hyo-jin
- Jung Yu-ra
- Yu So-jeong

Group A

Pos	Team	Pld	W	D	L	GF	GA	GD	Pts	Qualification
1	South Korea	4	4	0	0	151	86	+65	8	Semifinals
2	China	4	2	0	2	120	112	+8	4 (Note: Tied on head-to-head points (2). Head-to-head goal difference: CHN +2, PRK +1, KAZ −3.)	Semifinals
3	North Korea	4	2	0	2	139	125	+14	4	Classification 5th–8th
4	Kazakhstan	4	2	0	2	118	116	+2	4	Classification 5th–8th
5	India	4	0	0	4	77	166	−89	0	Classification 9th–10th

Source: AHF
Notes:

14 August; 16:00	North Korea	22–39	South Korea	POPKI Sports Hall, Jakarta; Referees: Al-Marhoon, Al-Mawt (BHR)
14 August; 16:00	Han C. 5	(12–17)	Jung Y. 12	POPKI Sports Hall, Jakarta; Referees: Al-Marhoon, Al-Mawt (BHR)
14 August; 16:00	1× (yellow card) 5× (suspension)		3× (yellow card) 4× (suspension)	POPKI Sports Hall, Jakarta; Referees: Al-Marhoon, Al-Mawt (BHR)

16 August; 16:00	India	18–45	South Korea	POPKI Sports Hall, Jakarta; Referees: Shakir, Kadhim (IRQ)
16 August; 16:00	Ritu 6	(9–20)	Yu 12	POPKI Sports Hall, Jakarta; Referees: Shakir, Kadhim (IRQ)
16 August; 16:00	1× (yellow card) 4× (suspension)		1× (yellow card) 1× (suspension)	POPKI Sports Hall, Jakarta; Referees: Shakir, Kadhim (IRQ)

21 August; 18:00	China	24–33	South Korea	POPKI Sports Hall, Jakarta; Referees: Al-Wahibi, Al-Shahi (OMA)
21 August; 18:00	Liu 5	(11–14)	Jung Y. 8	POPKI Sports Hall, Jakarta; Referees: Al-Wahibi, Al-Shahi (OMA)
21 August; 18:00	3× (yellow card) 1× (suspension)		3× (yellow card) 1× (suspension)	POPKI Sports Hall, Jakarta; Referees: Al-Wahibi, Al-Shahi (OMA)

23 August; 16:00	South Korea	34–22	Kazakhstan	POPKI Sports Hall, Jakarta; Referees: Li, Ke (CHN)
23 August; 16:00	Yu 7	(17–11)	Suyazova, Abilda 5	POPKI Sports Hall, Jakarta; Referees: Li, Ke (CHN)
23 August; 16:00	1× (yellow card) 2× (suspension)		1× (yellow card) 3× (suspension)	POPKI Sports Hall, Jakarta; Referees: Li, Ke (CHN)

Semifinal

27 August; 11:00	South Korea	40–13	Thailand	POPKI Sports Hall, Jakarta; Referees: Ota, Shimajiri (JPN)
27 August; 11:00	Choi 9	(16–7)	Paochanoun, Yaemyim, Joisakoo 3	POPKI Sports Hall, Jakarta; Referees: Ota, Shimajiri (JPN)
27 August; 11:00	2× (yellow card) 1× (suspension)		2× (yellow card) 1× (suspension)	POPKI Sports Hall, Jakarta; Referees: Ota, Shimajiri (JPN)

Final

30 August; 18:00	South Korea	29–23	China	POPKI Sports Hall, Jakarta; Referees: Ota, Shimajiri (JPN)
30 August; 18:00	Jung Y. 8	(12–9)	Liu 10	POPKI Sports Hall, Jakarta; Referees: Ota, Shimajiri (JPN)
30 August; 18:00	2× (yellow card)		3× (yellow card) 2× (suspension)	POPKI Sports Hall, Jakarta; Referees: Ota, Shimajiri (JPN)

== Jet ski ==
Athlete	Event	Moto Points				Ded.	Total	Rank
Athlete	Event	1	2	3	4	Ded.	Total	Rank
Kim Sung-min	Runabout limited	36	27	27	33	—N/a	123	9
Lee Dae-soo	Runabout limited	33	36	36	48	—N/a	153	5
Kim Sung-won	Runabout 1100 stock	20	20	30	24	—N/a	94	11
Yang Seo-jin	Runabout 1100 stock	22	27	27	36	—N/a	112	10
Kim Jin-won	Runabout endurance open	380	380	336	—N/a	−15	1081	4
Lee Min	Runabout endurance open	340	340	344	—N/a	−40	984	9

== Ju-jitsu ==
South Korea entered the ju-jitsu competition with 1 men's and 1 women's athletes.

Key:

- ADV – Won by advantages.
- RDC – Won by referee decision.
- SUB – Won by submission.

Men

Athlete	Event	Round of 32	Round of 16	Quarterfinals	Semifinals	Repechage	Final / BM	Rank
Athlete	Event	Opposition Result	Opposition Result	Opposition Result	Opposition Result	Opposition Result	Opposition Result	Rank
Hwang Myeng-se	–94 kg	B Fanous (JOR); W 3–0	B Ariuntsog (MGL); W 100^{SUB}–0	R Makhashev (KAZ); W 9–0	F Al-Ketbi (UAE); L 0–0^{ADV}	Bye	R Kussainov (KAZ); W 100^{SUB}–0	3rd place, bronze medalist(s)

Women

Athlete	Event	Round of 32	Round of 16	Quarterfinals	Semifinals	Repechage	Final / BM	Rank
Athlete	Event	Opposition Result	Opposition Result	Opposition Result	Opposition Result	Opposition Result	Opposition Result	Rank
Sung Ki-ra	–62 kg	A Ramirez (PHI); W 21–0	O Senatham (THA); W 26–0	Y Kakish (JOR); W 2–0	T Udval (MGL); W 5–0	—N/a	C Lien (SGP); W 4–2	1st place, gold medalist(s)

== Judo ==
Key:

- 1st number — Ippon
- 2nd number — Waza-ari
- H — Hansuke-make
- s — Shido

Men

Athlete	Event	Round of 32	Round of 16	Quarterfinals	Semifinals	Repechage	Final / BM	Rank
Athlete	Event	Opposition Result	Opposition Result	Opposition Result	Opposition Result	Opposition Result	Opposition Result	Rank
Lee Ha-rim	–60 kg	Bye	S Sithisane (LAO); W 10–00s2	D Amartüvshin (MGL); W 10s1–00s1	D Urozboev (UZB); L 00–01s1	Bye	Shang Y (CHN); W 01s1–00s1	3rd place, bronze medalist(s)
An Ba-ul	–66 kg	Bye	Huang S-t (TPE); W 01–00s1	A El-Idrissi (QAT); W 01s2–00s1	S Akhadov (UZB); W 01s2–00s2	—N/a	J Maruyama (JPN); W 10–00	1st place, gold medalist(s)
An Chang-rim	–73 kg	Bye	Nguyễn TC (VIE); W 10s1–00s1	B Khojazoda (TJK); W 01–00s1	M Mohammadi (IRI); W 10s1–00s1	—N/a	S Ono (JPN); L 00s2–01s2	2nd place, silver medalist(s)
Lee Seung-su	–81 kg	Bye	H Brar (IND); W 10s1–00s3	V Zoloev (KGZ); W 01s1–00s1	S Mollaei (IRI); L 00–11	Bye	O Uuganbaatar (MGL); L 00–01s2	–
Gwak Dong-han	–90 kg	Bye	Shen C-e (TPE); W 11–00	T Tejenov (TKM); W 11s2–00s3	M Baker (JPN); W 10s1–00s3	—N/a	G Altanbagana (MGL); W 10s1–00	1st place, gold medalist(s)
Cho Gu-ham	–100 kg	Bye	GGK Soethama (INA); W 10–00s1	S Saidov (TJK); W 01–00s2	I Remarenco (UAE); W 10–00s3	—N/a	K Iida (JPN); L 00s3–10s1	2nd place, silver medalist(s)
Kim Sung-min	+100 kg	—N/a	Bye	Yin YJ (CHN); W 10–00	T Ojitani (JPN); W 10–00H	—N/a	Ö Duurenbayar (MGL); W 01s2–00s1	1st place, gold medalist(s)

Women

Athlete	Event	Round of 32	Round of 16	Quarterfinals	Semifinals	Repechage	Final / BM	Rank
Athlete	Event	Opposition Result	Opposition Result	Opposition Result	Opposition Result	Opposition Result	Opposition Result	Rank
Jeong Bo-kyeong	–48 kg	—N/a	Hoàng TT (VIE); W 11s1–00s1	Xiong Y (CHN); W 10–00s1	M Urantsetseg (MGL); W 01s2–00s1	—N/a	A Kondo (JPN); W 01–00s1	1st place, gold medalist(s)
Park Da-sol	–52 kg	Bye	AN Istiqomah (INA); W 10–00	G Ziyaeva (UZB); W 10–00	G Gantsetseg (MGL); W 10–00	—N/a	N Tsunoda (JPN); L 00–11	2nd place, silver medalist(s)
Kim Jan-di	–57 kg	Bye	S Qalandarova (TJK); W 10–00	M Tamaoki (JPN); L 00–10	Did not advance	Lien C-l (TPE); L 00s2–10s2	Did not advance	
Han Hee-ju	–63 kg	—N/a	S Silva (LBN); W 10s1–00s1	Tang J (CHN); L 00s1–10	Did not advance	AY Fradivtha (INA); W 10–00s1	B Gankhaich (MGL); W 01s2–00s2	3rd place, bronze medalist(s)
Kim Seong-yeon	–70 kg	—N/a	H Windawati (INA); W 11–00s2	M Takahashi (PHI); W 11–00	G Matniyazova (UZB); W 01–00	—N/a	S Niizoe (JPN); L 00–01s1	2nd place, silver medalist(s)
Park Yu-jin	–78 kg	—N/a	Bye	P Shrestha (NEP); W 10–00s2	N Yuldasheva (UZB); W 10–00s1	—N/a	R Sato (JPN); L 00s2–10s1	2nd place, silver medalist(s)
Kim Min-jeong	+78 kg	—N/a	Bye	R Ilmatova (UZB); W 10–00s1	Wang Y (CHN); W 10–00s1	—N/a	A Sone (JPN); L 00s2–01s1	2nd place, silver medalist(s)

Mixed

Athlete	Event	Round of 16	Quarterfinals	Semifinals	Repechage	Final / BM	Rank
Athlete	Event	Opposition Result	Opposition Result	Opposition Result	Opposition Result	Opposition Result	Rank
Ahn Joo-sung; An Chang-rim; Cho Gu-ham; Gwak Dong-han; Han Mi-jin; Jeong Hye-jin; Kim Jan-di; Kim Min-jeong; Kim Seong-yeon; Kim Sung-min; Kwon You-jeong; Lee Jae-yong	Team	Chinese Taipei (TPE); W 4–1	Japan (JPN); L 3^{21}–3^{30}	Did not advance	Bye	Uzbekistan (UZB); W 4–0	3rd place, bronze medalist(s)

== Kabaddi ==
Team	Event	Group Stage					Semifinals	Final	
Team	Event	Opposition Score	Opposition Score	Opposition Score	Opposition Score	Rank	Opposition Score	Opposition Score	Rank
South Korea men's	Men's tournament	Thailand; W 52–21	India; W 24–23	Bangladesh; W 38–18	Sri Lanka; W 33–22	1 Q	Pakistan; W 27–24	Iran; L 16–26	2nd place, silver medalist(s)
South Korea women's	Women's tournament	Iran; L 20–46	Chinese Taipei; W 20–16	Bangladesh; W 52–25	—N/a	3	Did not advance		5

=== Men's tournament ===
Team roster

- Lee Dong-geon
- Eom Tae-deok
- Ok Yong-joo
- Lee Jang-kun
- Hong Dong-ju
- Kim Dong-gyu
- Park Chan-sik
- Jo Jae-pil
- Kim Seong-ryeol
- Park Hyun-il
- Kim Gyung-tae
- Ko Young-chang

Group A

Pos	Team	Pld	W	D	L	PF	PA	PD	Pts	Qualification
1	South Korea	4	4	0	0	147	84	+63	8	Semifinals
2	India	4	3	0	1	166	103	+63	6	Semifinals
3	Bangladesh	4	2	0	2	102	135	−33	4	
4	Sri Lanka	4	1	0	3	121	135	−14	2	
5	Thailand	4	0	0	4	102	181	−79	0	

Source: OCA

19 August
16:00

South Korea	52–21 (HT: 22–15)	Thailand

Garuda Theatre, Jakarta

20 August
16:00

India	23–24 (HT: 11–14)	South Korea

Garuda Theatre, Jakarta

22 August
16:00

Bangladesh	18–38 (HT: 8–18)	South Korea

Garuda Theatre, Jakarta

23 August
9:00

South Korea	33–22 (HT: 15–8)	Sri Lanka

Garuda Theatre, Jakarta

Semifinal

23 August
17:00

South Korea	27–24 (HT: 11–10)	Pakistan

Garuda Theatre, Jakarta

Final

24 August
17:00

South Korea	16–26 (HT: 8–10)	Iran

Garuda Theatre, Jakarta

=== Women's tournament ===
Team roster

- Kim Ji-young
- Kim Hee-jeong
- Lee Hyun-jeong
- Shin So-min
- Pak Min-kyung
- Park Ji-yi
- Woo Hee-jun
- Im Jae-won
- Jo Hyun-a
- Yoon Yu-ri
- Hong Hye-min

Group B

Pos	Team	Pld	W	D	L	PF	PA	PD	Pts	Qualification
1	Iran	3	2	0	1	111	61	+50	4 (Note: Match points difference against the teams which scored 25% or more of the league points: IRI +22, TPE 0, KOR −22.)	Semifinals
2	Chinese Taipei	3	2	0	1	81	66	+15	4	Semifinals
3	South Korea	3	2	0	1	92	87	+5	4	
4	Bangladesh	3	0	0	3	72	142	−70	0	

Source: OCA
Notes:

19 August
9:50

Iran	46–20 (HT: 23–9)	South Korea

Garuda Theatre, Jakarta

20 August
9:50

Chinese Taipei	16–20 (HT: 7–8)	South Korea

Garuda Theatre, Jakarta

21 August
11:30

Bangladesh	25–52 (HT: 11–20)	South Korea

Garuda Theatre, Jakarta

== Kurash ==
Men

Athlete	Event	Round of 32	Round of 16	Quarterfinal	Semifinal	Final	
Athlete	Event	Opposition Score	Opposition Score	Opposition Score	Opposition Score	Opposition Score	Rank
Choi Hee-jun	–66 kg	Jatin (IND); L 002−002	Did not advance				

Women

Athlete	Event	Round of 32	Round of 16	Quarterfinal	Semifinal	Final	
Athlete	Event	Opposition Score	Opposition Score	Opposition Score	Opposition Score	Opposition Score	Rank
Choi Seo-eun	–63 kg	Naderi (IRI); L 000−101	Did not advance				

== Modern pentathlon ==
South Korea entered four pentathletes (2 men's and 2 women's) at the Games.

Athlete	Event	Swimming (200 m freestyle)		Fencing (épée one touch)		Riding (show jumping)		Laser-run (shooting 10 m air pistol/ running 3200 m)		Total points	Final rank
Athlete	Event	Rank	MP points	Rank	MP points	Rank	MP points	Rank	MP points	Total points	Final rank
Jun Woong-tae	Men's	1	315	1	244	7	291	4	622	1472	1st place, gold medalist(s)
Lee Ji-hun	Men's	4	312	2	235	9	268	2	644	1459	2nd place, silver medalist(s)
Kim Se-hee	Women's	6	285	4	234	4	286	1	545	1350	2nd place, silver medalist(s)
Kim Sun-woo	Women's	7	285	2	244	5	280	3	539	1348	3rd place, bronze medalist(s)

== Paragliding ==
Men

Athlete	Event	Round										Total	Rank
Athlete	Event	1	2	3	4	5	6	7	8	9	10	Total	Rank
Lee Chul-soo	Individual accuracy	87	~~192~~	4	6	14	4	3	1	8	1	128	3rd place, bronze medalist(s)
Lee Seong-min	Individual accuracy	19	~~333~~	5	157	2	4	1	13	209	17	427	11
Kim Jin-oh; Lee Chang-min; Lee Chul-soo; Lee Seong-min; Lim Moon-seob	Team accuracy	622	841	81	181	24	22	—N/a				1771	2nd place, silver medalist(s)
Kim Jin-oh; Lee Chang-min; Lee Chul-soo; Lee Seong-min; Lim Moon-seob	Cross-country	2500	689	2619	2168	2187	—N/a					10163	4

Women

Athlete	Event	Round										Total	Rank
Athlete	Event	1	2	3	4	5	6	7	8	9	10	Total	Rank
Jang Woo-young	Individual accuracy	~~500~~	204	17	479	92	204	7	22	36	6	1067	6
Lee Da-gyeom	Individual accuracy	1	7	0	12	61	~~88~~	4	2	7	4	98	2nd place, silver medalist(s)
Baek Jin-hee; Jang Woo-young; Lee Da-gyeom	Team accuracy	502	218	517	585	240	301	—N/a				2363	3rd place, bronze medalist(s)
Baek Jin-hee; Jang Woo-young; Lee Da-gyeom	Cross-country	1036	408	1052	1843	585	—N/a					4924	1st place, gold medalist(s)

== Roller sports ==
=== Skateboarding ===
Athlete	Event	Preliminary		Final	
Athlete	Event	Result	Rank	Result	Rank
Eugene Choi	Men's park	58.00	6 Q	42.00	6
Han Jae-jin	Men's park	63.33	4 Q	66.33	4
Eun Ju-won	Men's street	24.9	5 Q	25.4	3rd place, bronze medalist(s)
Yu Ji-woong	Men's street	20.8	9	Did not advance	

=== Speed skating ===
Athlete	Event	Final	
Athlete	Event	Time	Rank
Choi Gwang-ho	Men's road 20 km race	33:51.653	2nd place, silver medalist(s)
Son Geun-seong	Men's road 20 km race	33:51.967	3rd place, bronze medalist(s)
Jang Soo-ji	Women's road 20 km race	44:51.945	5
Yu Ga-ram	Women's road 20 km race	44:52.006	6

== Rowing ==
Men

Athlete	Event	Heats		Repechage		Final	
Athlete	Event	Time	Rank	Time	Rank	Time	Rank
Kim Dong-yong	Single sculls	7:59.58	2 R	7:40.97	1 FA	7:30.86	2nd place, silver medalist(s)
Kim Hwi-gwan; Kim Jong-jin	Double sculls	7:06.29	1 FA	Bye		7:00.42	5
Lee Seon-soo; Son Seong-min; Jin Doo-hwa; Kang Woo-kyu	Quadruple sculls	6:33.71	4 R	6:30.42	3 FA	6:41.92	6
Park Hyun-su	Lightweight single sculls	7:22.08	1 FA	Bye		7:12.86	1st place, gold medalist(s)
Kim Byung-hoon; Lee Min-hyuk	Lightweight double sculls	7:02.05	1 FA	Bye		7:03.22	2nd place, silver medalist(s)

Women

Athlete	Event	Heats		Repechage		Final	
Athlete	Event	Time	Rank	Time	Rank	Time	Rank
Kim Seul-gi; Kim Ye-ji	Double sculls	7:55.81	2 FA	—N/a		7:34.73	2nd place, silver medalist(s)
Jeon Seo-yeong; Kim Seo-hee	Coxless pair	8:23.71	1 FA	Bye		8:00.25	2nd place, silver medalist(s)
Jung Hye-ri; Ku Bo-yeun; Choi Yu-ri; Ji Yoo-jin	Lightweight quadruple sculls	7:31.13	2 R	7:25.38	1 FA	7:06.22	3rd place, bronze medalist(s)

== Rugby sevens ==
South Korea rugby sevens men's team entered the group C at the Games, while the women's team placed in group A.

Team	Event	Group Stage				Quarterfinals	Semifinals / Pl.	Final / BM / Pl.	
Team	Event	Opposition Score	Opposition Score	Opposition Score	Rank	Opposition Score	Opposition Score	Opposition Score	Rank
South Korea men's	Men's tournament	Afghanistan; W 42–5	Sri Lanka; W 31–26	United Arab Emirates; W 51–0	1 Q	Malaysia; W 40–5	Hong Kong; L 7–19	Sri Lanka; W 36–14	3rd place, bronze medalist(s)
South Korea women's	Women's tournament	China; L 0–69	Singapore; L 17–22	Hong Kong; L 0–38	4	Japan; L 7–35	Singapore; L 7–17	Indonesia; W 27–0	7

=== Men's tournament ===
Team squad

The following is the South Korea squad in the men's rugby sevens tournament of the 2018 Asian Games.

Head coach: Choi Chang-ryul

- Chang Yong-heung
- Han Kun-kyu
- Hwang In-jo
- Jang Jeong-min
- Jang Seong-min
- Kim Gwong-min
- Kim Hyun-soo
- Kim Jeong-min
- Kim Jin-hyeok
- Kim Nam-uk
- Kim Sung-soo
- Lee Jae-bok

Group C

Pos	Team	Pld	W	D	L	PF	PA	PD	Pts	Qualification
1	South Korea	3	3	0	0	124	31	+93	9	Quarterfinals
2	Sri Lanka	3	2	0	1	130	31	+99	7	Quarterfinals
3	Afghanistan	3	1	0	2	41	78	−37	5	Ranking round 9–12
4	United Arab Emirates	3	0	0	3	0	155	−155	3	Ranking round 9–12

Source: Results

30 August
14:18

South Korea	42–5	Afghanistan
Try: Chang 1' c Han 5' c Kim J.M. 8' c Jang S. 10' c Lee 12' c Hwang 14+' c Con: Lee (5/5); Kim S. (1/1)		Try: Zak. Slaimankhel 7' m Con: O. Slaimankhel (0/1)

Gelora Bung Karno Rugby Field, Jakarta
Referee: Noriaki Hashimoto (Japan)

30 August
17:58

South Korea	31–26	Sri Lanka
Try: Jang S. (2) 1' m, 3' m Han (2) 7' c, 14' c Lee 8' c Con: Lee (3/4)		Try: Sooriyabandara 5' c Raffaideen 10' c Piyarathna 12' m Sooriyarachchi 14+' c Con: Sooriyabandara (1/2); Raffaideen (1/1); Sooriyarachchi (1/1)

Gelora Bung Karno Rugby Field, Jakarta
Referee: Matthew Rodden (New Zealand)

31 August
14:40

South Korea	51–0	United Arab Emirates
Try: Jang J. (4) 4' m, 4' c, 7' c, 9' m Kim N. 5' m Hwang 8' m Chang (2) 12' m, 14' m Han 14+' c Con: Lee (2/3); Kim N. (0/1); Kim S. (0/4); Kim J.H. (1/1)

Gelora Bung Karno Rugby Field, Jakarta
Referee: Charlie Brown (Ireland)

Quarterfinal

31 August
17:58

South Korea	40–5	Malaysia
Try: Kim J.M. 1' c Kim H. 4' c Kim N. 7+' c Jang J. 10' m Chang (2) 14' c, 14+' c Con: Lee (3/3); Kim N. (2/3)		Try: Mat Zizi 8' m Con: Mat Zizi (0/1)

Gelora Bung Karno Rugby Field, Jakarta
Referee: Matthew Rodden (New Zealand)

Semifinal

1 September
17:18

South Korea	7–19	Hong Kong
Try: Jang J. 8' c Con: Lee (1/1)		Try: Lee (2) 5' c, 7' c Rimene 11' m Con: Hood (1/2); Rimene (1/1)

Gelora Bung Karno Rugby Field, Jakarta
Referee: Suguru Kamamuta (Japan)

Bronze medal match

1 September
20:14

Sri Lanka	14–36	South Korea
Try: Ratwatte 8' c Dissanayake 12' c Con: Ratwatte (2/2)		Try: Chang 3' c Kim J.M. 6' m Jang J. 7' c Kim H. 10' c Kim J.H. 13' m Hwang 14+' m Con: Lee (1/1); Kim N. (2/4); Kim S. (0/1)

Gelora Bung Karno Rugby Field, Jakarta
Referee: Noriaki Hashimoto (Japan)

=== Women's tournament ===
Team squad

The following is the South Korea squad in the women's rugby sevens tournament of the 2018 Asian Games.

Head coach: Cho Sung-lyong

- Baek Jie-un
- Gwon Seul-gi
- Heo Kyung-hee
- Kim Yu-ri
- Lee Min-hui
- Lim Jae-won
- Min Kyung-jin
- Park Seong-bin
- Park Su-ji
- Seo Bo-hee
- Shin Ye-lim
- Yang Sol-hee

Group A

Pos	Team	Pld	W	D	L	PF	PA	PD	Pts	Qualification
1	China	3	3	0	0	142	7	+135	9	Quarterfinals
2	Hong Kong	3	2	0	1	71	39	+32	7	Quarterfinals
3	Singapore	3	1	0	2	29	84	−55	5	Quarterfinals
4	South Korea	3	0	0	3	17	129	−112	3	Quarterfinals

Source: Results

30 August
11:00

China	69–0	South Korea
Try: Yu X. 2' m Chen K. (3) 3' c, 13' c, 14' m Yang (2) 6' c, 14+' c Wang (2) 7+' c, 8' m Liu (2) 10' m, 10' c Chen M. 13' c Con: Yu X. (2/3); Chen K. (1/2); Chen M. (4/5)

Gelora Bung Karno Rugby Field, Jakarta
Referee: Patrick Kwok (Hong Kong)

30 August
14:40

Singapore	22–17	South Korea
Try: Sim 2' m Abdul Gaffor 6' c Chan J.Y. 8' m J. Chan 14+' m Con: Ow Yong (0/1); Abdul Gaffor (1/3)		Try: Gwon 7' c Yang 7+' m Lee 12' m Con: Lee (1/3)

Gelora Bung Karno Rugby Field, Jakarta
Referee: Phoenix Xu (China)

31 August
10:52

Hong Kong	38–0	South Korea
Try: Kwong 1' c Olson-Thorne 3' c Chong (2) 5' m, 7' c S. Chan 12' c V. Poon 14' m Con: S. Chan (4/6)

Gelora Bung Karno Rugby Field, Jakarta
Referee: Charlie Brown (Ireland)

Quarterfinal

31 August
16:08

South Korea	7–35	Japan
Try: Lim 11' c Con: Lee (1/1)		Try: Kurogi (2) 2' m, 10' m Taniguchi 4' m Bativakalolo 5' m Kuwai 7+' m Tanaka 13' m Nakamura 14+' m Con: Tanaka (0/5); Okuroda (0/2)

Gelora Bung Karno Rugby Field, Jakarta
Referee: Phoenix Xu (China)

5th–8th place semifinal

1 September
15:06

Singapore	17–7	South Korea
Try: Sim 6' m Abdul Gaffor 9' m Low 14' c Con: Abdul Gaffor (0/2); Ow Yong (1/1)		Try: Lim 3' c Con: Lee (1/1)

Gelora Bung Karno Rugby Field, Jakarta
Referee: Ai Yoshida (Japan)

7th place match

1 September
18:24

Indonesia	0–27	South Korea
		Try: Gwon 2' c Lee (3) 4' m, 8' m, 14+' m Seo 11' m Con: Lee (1/5)

Gelora Bung Karno Rugby Field, Jakarta
Referee: Leow Wei Liang (Singapore)

== Sailing ==
Men

Athlete	Event	Race															Total	Rank
Athlete	Event	1	2	3	4	5	6	7	8	9	10	11	12	13	14	15	Total	Rank
Lee Tae-hoon	RS:X	3	3	2	2	1	~~(4)~~	3	3	3	3	2	4	3	2	2	36	3rd place, bronze medalist(s)
Ha Jee-min	Laser	2	1	1	1.8; DPI	2	3	3	4	1	1	2	~~(6)~~	—N/a			21.8	1st place, gold medalist(s)
Chae Bon-jin; Kim Dong-wook	49er	4	1	2.5; RDG	4	4	4	1	3	~~(8)~~	2	4	3	4	3	3	42.5	2nd place, silver medalist(s)
Kim Chang-ju; Kim Ji-hoon	470	3	3	5	3	3	1	2	~~(12)~~; BFD	5	5	2	4	—N/a			43	4

Women

Athlete	Event	Race															Total	Rank
Athlete	Event	1	2	3	4	5	6	7	8	9	10	11	12	13	14	15	Total	Rank
Kim Ji-a	Laser Radial	6	9	9	8	6	7	9	7	5	7	~~(11)~~; DSQ	6	—N/a			79	7

Mixed

Athlete	Event	Race															Total	Rank
Athlete	Event	1	2	3	4	5	6	7	8	9	10	11	12	13	14	15	Total	Rank
Kim Da-jeong	Laser 4.7	5	~~(11)~~	7	8	8	7	5	10	10	9	6	10	—N/a			85	7
Kim Dong-wook	Laser 4.7	10	7	10	15	~~(20)~~	8	13	14	16	16	11	13	—N/a			133	15
Seo Young-kil; Kim Sae-bom	RS:One	~~(16)~~	15	13	10	10	10	6	12	16	16	13	14	12	13	9	169	6

== Sepak takraw ==
Men

Athlete	Event	Group Stage					Semifinal	Final	
Athlete	Event	Opposition Score	Opposition Score	Opposition Score	Opposition Score	Rank	Opposition Score	Opposition Score	Rank
Lim Tae-gyun; Lee Jun-ho; Kim Young-man; Shim Jae-chul; Jeong Won-deok	Regu	India (IND); W 2–0	Nepal (NEP); W 2–0	China (CHN); W 2–0	Malaysia (MAS); L 0–2	2 Q	Indonesia (INA); L 0–2	Did not advance	3rd place, bronze medalist(s)
Lee Woo-jin; Jeon Young-man; Woo Gyeong-han; Kim Young-man; Shim Jae-chul; Sin Seung-tae; Im An-soo; Lee Min-ju; Hong Seung-hyun; Hwang Yong-kwan; Lee Myung-jung; Park Cheol-hee	Team regu	Malaysia (MAS); L 0–3	Thailand (THA); L 0–3	—N/a		3	Did not advance		

Women

Athlete	Event	Group Stage				Semifinal	Final	
Athlete	Event	Opposition Score	Opposition Score	Opposition Score	Rank	Opposition Score	Opposition Score	Rank
Kim Dong-hee; Kim I-seul; Bae Han-oul; Jeon Gyu-mi; Lee Min-ju; Park Seon-ju	Quadrant	Indonesia (INA); L 1–2	Laos (LAO); L 0–2	Myanmar (MYA); L 0–2	4	Did not advance		
Kim Dong-hee; Kim I-seul; Bae Han-oul; Jeon Gyu-mi; Kim Ji-eun; Lee Min-ju; Choi Ji-na; Yu Seong-hee; Kim Ji-young; Kim Hee-jin; Park Seon-ju; Jung Ju-seung	Team regu	India (IND); W 3–0	Thailand (THA); L 0–3	Laos (LAO); W 3–0	2 Q	Vietnam (VIE); W 2–0	Thailand (THA); L 0–2	2nd place, silver medalist(s)

== Shooting ==
Men

Athlete	Event	Qualification		Final	
Athlete	Event	Points	Rank	Points	Rank
Jin Jong-oh	10 m air pistol	584	2 Q	178.4	5
Lee Dae-myung	10 m air pistol	579	8 Q	156.4	6
Kim Jun-hong	25 m rapid fire pistol	589 QGR	1 Q	29	3rd place, bronze medalist(s)
Song Jong-ho	25 m rapid fire pistol	578	7	Did not advance	
Kim Hyeon-jun	10 m air rifle	623.5	10	Did not advance	
Song Soo-joo	10 m air rifle	629.7	2 Q	184.4	5
Cheon Min-ho	50 m rifle three positions	1159	9	Did not advance	
Kim Hyeon-jun	50 m rifle three positions	1143	19	Did not advance	
Choi Young-jeon	300 m standard rifle	—N/a		569 GR	1st place, gold medalist(s)
Lee Won-gyu	300 m standard rifle	—N/a		563	3rd place, bronze medalist(s)
Cho Se-jong	10 m running target	568	4 Q	SF: Pak M-w (PRK); L 5–7; BM: Ngô H V (VIE); L 1–6	4
Jeong You-jin	10 m running target	568	3 Q	SF: Ngô H V (VIE); W 6–3; F: Pak M-w (PRK); W 6–4	1st place, gold medalist(s)
Cho Se-jong	10 m running target mixed	—N/a		373	9
Kwak Yong-bin	10 m running target mixed	—N/a		377	4
Ahn Dae-myeong	Trap	119	3 Q	30	3rd place, bronze medalist(s)
Eum Ji-won	Trap	119	2 Q	23	5
Hwang Sung-jin	Double trap	137	6 Q	36	5
Shin Hyun-woo	Double trap	138	3 Q	74	1st place, gold medalist(s)
Hwang Jung-soo	Skeet	119	15	Did not advance	
Lee Jong-jun	Skeet	117	19	Did not advance	

Women

Athlete	Event	Qualification		Final	
Athlete	Event	Points	Rank	Points	Rank
Kim Min-jung	10 m air pistol	575	2 Q	237.6	2nd place, silver medalist(s)
Kwak Jung-hye	10 m air pistol	571	6 Q	155.6	6
Kim Min-jung	25 m pistol	585	2 Q	29	3rd place, bronze medalist(s)
Kwak Jung-hye	25 m pistol	580	8 Q	13	7
Jung Eun-hea	10 m air rifle	627.0	3 Q	248.6	2nd place, silver medalist(s)
Keum Ji-hyeon	10 m air rifle	623.0	9	Did not advance	
Bae Sang-hee	50 m rifle three positions	1163	5 Q	409.7	6
Jeong Mi-ra	50 m rifle three positions	1161	7 Q	420.0	5
Kang Gee-eun	Trap	116	5 Q	44	2nd place, silver medalist(s)
Lee Bo-na	Trap	114	9	Did not advance	
Kang Gee-eun	Double trap	—N/a		121	5
Lee Bo-na	Double trap	—N/a		124	4
Kim Min-ji	Skeet	116	5 Q	42	3rd place, bronze medalist(s)
Son Hye-kyoung	Skeet	113	9	Did not advance	

Mixed team

Athlete	Event	Qualification		Final	
Athlete	Event	Points	Rank	Points	Rank
Lee Dae-myung; Kim Min-jung	10 m air pistol	768	2 Q	467.6	2nd place, silver medalist(s)
Kim Hyeon-jun; Jung Eun-hea	10 m air rifle	836.7 QGR	1 Q	389.4	4
Ahn Dae-myeong; Kang Gee-eun	Trap	143	4 Q	22	5

== Soft tennis ==
Athlete	Event	Group Stage				Quarterfinals	Semifinals	Final	
Athlete	Event	Opposition Score	Opposition Score	Opposition Score	Rank	Opposition Score	Opposition Score	Opposition Score	Rank
Kim Dong-hoon	Men's singles	N Damian Jr. (PHI); W 4–0	T Enkhbaatar (MGL); W 4–0	—N/a	1 Q	K Nagae (JPN); W 4–0	Kim J-w (KOR); W 4–1	AE Sie (INA); W 4–2	1st place, gold medalist(s)
Kim Jin-woong	Men's singles	M Yahya (PAK); W 4–0	H Funemizu (JPN); W 4–0	—N/a	1 Q	Ri C-i (PRK); W 4–2	Kim D-h (KOR); L 1–4	Did not advance	3rd place, bronze medalist(s)
Kim Ji-yeon	Women's singles	S Rin (CAM); W 4–0	DT Kusrini (INA); W 4–3	—N/a	1 Q	N Takahashi (JPN); L 3–4	Did not advance		
Kim Young-hai	Women's singles	P Champamanivong (LAO); W 4–0	K Onoue (JPN); L 2–4	—N/a	2	Did not advance			
Kim Beom-jun; Kim Ji-yeon	Mixed doubles	W Ratthapobkorrapak / S Naree (THA); W 5–1	S Yi / M Meth (CAM); W 5–1	—N/a	1 Q	Kim M-h / So J-i (PRK); W 5–1	Yu K-w / Cheng C-l (TPE); L 1–5	Did not advance	3rd place, bronze medalist(s)
Kim Ki-sung; Mun Hye-gyeong	Mixed doubles	Ri C-i / Hong J-s (PRK); WO	S Vannasak / M Aliya (LAO); W 5–0	—N/a	1 Q	Kuo C-c / Kuo C-c (TPE); W 5–2	T Uematsu / R Hayashida (JPN); W 5–3	Yu K-w / Cheng C-l (TPE); L 3–5	2nd place, silver medalist(s)
Jeon Jee-heon; Kim Beom-jun; Kim Dong-hoon; Kim Jin-woong; Kim Ki-sung	Men's team	Pakistan (PAK); W 3–0	Laos (LAO); W 3–0	Philippines (PHI); W 3–0	1 Q	Bye	Indonesia (INA); W 2–0	Japan (JPN); W 2–0	1st place, gold medalist(s)
Baek Seol; Kim Ji-yeon; Kim Young-hai; Mun Hye-gyeong; Yoo Ye-seul	Women's team	Thailand (THA); W 3–0	India (IND); W 3–0	Mongolia (MGL); W 3–0	1 Q	Bye	China (CHN); W 2–0	Japan (JPN); L 1–2	2nd place, silver medalist(s)

== Softball ==
Team	Event	Group Stage		Semifinals	Bronze medal match	Final	
Team	Event	Oppositions Scores	Rank	Opposition Score	Opposition Score	Opposition Score	Rank
South Korea women's	Women's tournament	Hong Kong: W 5–1; Chinese Taipei: L 2–3; Philippines: L 3–5; China: L 1–2; Indonesia: W 4–2; Japan: L 0–10	5	Did not advance			

Team roster
- Bae Nae-hye
- Bae Yu-ka
- Jang Se-jin
- Jeon Dae-rim
- Jeong Yoon-young
- Jung Hye-in
- Jung Na-rae
- Kim Ha-na
- Kim Seo-hyeon
- Kim Yu-jeong
- Lee Mi-sun
- Lee Ye-ji
- Park Su-youn
- Seol Ga-eun
- Suk Eun-jung
- Won Hye-song
- Yang I-seul

Preliminary round

Final round
Eliminated

The top four teams will advance to the final round.

Team	W	L	RS	RA	WIN%	GB	Tiebreaker
Japan	6	0	59	3	1.000	–	
China	4	2	30	16	0.667	2	1–1; RA = 1
Philippines	4	2	20	17	0.667	2	1–1; RA = 3
Chinese Taipei	4	2	27	13	0.667	2	1–1; RA = 7
South Korea	2	4	15	23	0.333	4	
Indonesia	1	5	15	41	0.167	5	
Hong Kong	0	6	2	55	0.000	6	

August 19; 10:00	Hong Kong	1–5	South Korea	GBK Softball field
August 19; 10:00		Boxscore		GBK Softball field

August 19; 15:00	South Korea	2–3	Chinese Taipei	GBK Softball field
August 19; 15:00		Boxscore		GBK Softball field

August 20; 15:00	South Korea	3–5	Philippines	GBK Softball field
August 20; 15:00		Boxscore		GBK Softball field

August 21; 10:00	China	2–1	South Korea	GBK Softball field
August 21; 10:00		Boxscore		GBK Softball field

August 21; 15:00	South Korea	4–2	Indonesia	GBK Softball field
August 21; 15:00		Boxscore		GBK Softball field

August 22; 10:00	Japan	10–0	South Korea	GBK Softball field
August 22; 10:00		Boxscore		GBK Softball field

== Sport climbing ==
Speed

Athlete	Event	Qualification		Round of 16	Quarterfinals	Semifinals	Final / BM	
Athlete	Event	Best	Rank	Opposition Time	Opposition Time	Opposition Time	Opposition Time	Rank
Lee Seung-beom	Men's	6.182	5 Q	T Narasaki (JPN); W 6.512–6.830	A Jaelolo (INA); L 6.118–5.794	Did not advance		5
Lee Yong-su	Men's	6.473	8 Q	Li JX (CHN); W 6.629–8.228	Zhong QX (CHN); L 6.246–5.975	Did not advance		6
Park Seo-yeon	Women's	10.475	12 Q	A Marlenova (KAZ); L 10.470–9.236	Did not advance			10
Sa Sol	Women's	9.777	8 Q	A Karami (IRI); W 9.690–10.924	A S Rahayu (INA); L 9.428–8.090	Did not advance		6

Speed relay

Athlete	Event	Qualification		Quarterfinals	Semifinals	Final / BM	
Athlete	Event	Time	Rank	Opposition Time	Opposition Time	Opposition Time	Rank
South Korea 1 Lee Seung-beom; Lee Yong-su; Son Min	Men's	Fall	14	Did not advance			
South Korea 2 Choi Seung-bin; Kim Han-wool; Son Jong-seok	Men's	26.192	10	Did not advance			
South Korea 1 Cha You-jin; Park Seo-yeon; Sa Sol	Women's	Fall	12	Did not advance			
South Korea 2 Choi Na-woo; Ko Jeong-ran; Son Sung-a	Women's	33.891	6 Q	China 2 (CHN); L 33.605–29.281	Did not advance		5

Combined

Athlete	Event	Qualification					Final				
Athlete	Event	Speed point	Boulder point	Lead point	Total	Rank	Speed point	Boulder point	Lead point	Total	Rank
Chon Jong-won	Men's	10	2	4	80	2 Q	2	1	3	6	1st place, gold medalist(s)
Kim Han-wool	Men's	9	3	3	81	3 Q	3	5	4	60	5
Kim Ja-in	Women's	8	2	1	16	1 Q	5	3	1	15	3rd place, bronze medalist(s)
Sa Sol	Women's	6	1	3	18	2 Q	1	4	3	12	2nd place, silver medalist(s)

== Squash ==
Singles

Athlete	Event	Round of 32	Round of 16	Quarterfinals	Semifinals	Final	
Athlete	Event	Opposition Score	Opposition Score	Opposition Score	Opposition Score	Opposition Score	Rank
Ko Young-jo	Men's	H P Sandhu (IND); L 0–3	Did not advance				
Lee Se-hyun	Men's	S Zareian (IRI); L 1–3	Did not advance				
Ahn Eun-tschan	Women's	M Zafar (PAK); W 3–0	J Chan (HKG); L 0–3	Did not advance			
Choi Yu-ra	Women's	Liu K C (MAC); W 3–0	M Kobayashi (JPN); L 2–3	Did not advance			

Team

Athlete	Event	Group Stage						Semifinals	Final	
Athlete	Event	Opposition Score	Opposition Score	Opposition Score	Opposition Score	Opposition Score	Rank	Opposition Score	Opposition Score	Rank
Ko Young-jo; Lee Se-hyun; Lee Seung-taek; Lee Nyeon-ho	Men's	Nepal (NEP); W 3–0	Philippines (PHI); W 2–1	Hong Kong (HKG); L 0–3	Japan (JPN); L 0–3	Pakistan (PAK); L 0–3	4	Did not advance		
Choi Yu-ra; Ahn Eun-tschan; Eum Hwa-yeong; Lee Ji-hyun	Women's	Pakistan (PAK); W 3–0	Malaysia (MAS); L 0–3	Philippines (PHI); W 2–1	Japan (JPN); L 1–2	—N/a	3	Did not advance		

== Swimming ==
Freestyle

Athlete	Event	Heats		Final	
Athlete	Event	Time	Rank	Time	Rank
Seo Min-suk	Men's 50 m	22.88	=12	Did not advance	
Yang Jae-hoon	Men's 50 m	22.77	10	Did not advance	
Yang Jae-hoon	Men's 100 m	49.57	7 Q	49.83	8
Park Seon-kwan	Men's 100 m	50.03	12	Did not advance	
Jang Dong-hyeok	Men's 200 m	1:50.48	10	Did not advance	
Jang Dong-hyeok	Men's 400 m	4:03.46	14	Did not advance	
Lee Ho-joon	Men's 200 m	1:48.49	6 Q	1:48.10	7
Lee Ho-joon	Men's 400 m	3:52.80	3 Q	3:48.28	4
Lee Ho-joon	Men's 1500 m	—N/a		15:44.99	10
Jang Dong-hyeok; Lee Ho-joon; Lee Ju-ho; Park Jung-hun; Park Seon-kwan; Yang Jae-hoon	Men's 4 × 100 m relay	3:21.16	4 Q	3:17.92	4
Jang Dong-hyeok; Joo Jae-gu; Kim Min-suk; Lee Ho-joon; Park Jung-hun; Yang Jae-hoon	Men's 4 × 200 m relay	7:24.32	2 Q	7:15.26	4
Kim Min-ju	Women's 50 m	25.83	7 Q	25.81	7
Kim Min-ju	Women's 100 m	57.62	13	Did not advance	
Ko Mi-so	Women's 50 m	26.19	11	Did not advance	
Ko Mi-so	Women's 100 m	56.35	5 Q	56.07	6
Kim Jin-ha	Women's 200 m	2:03.11	9	Did not advance	
Kim Jin-ha	Women's 400 m	4:21.75	8	4:16.84	5
Choi Jung-min	Women's 200 m	2:04.90	13	Did not advance	
Choi Jung-min	Women's 400 m	DNS		Did not advance	
Choi Jung-min	Women's 800 m	—N/a		9:01.36	9
Han Da-kyung	Women's 800 m	—N/a		8:48.38	6
Han Da-kyung	Women's 1500 m	—N/a		16:58.57	6
Choi Jung-min; Kim Jin-ha; Kim Min-ju; Ko Mi-so; Park Han-byeol; Park Ye-rin	Women's 4 × 100 m relay	3:47.91	6 Q	3:48.76	6
Choi Jung-min; Han Da-kyung; Im Da-sol; Kim Jin-ha; Ko Mi-so	Women's 4 × 200 m relay	8:25.14	3 Q	8:14.36	4

Backstroke

Athlete	Event	Heats		Final	
Athlete	Event	Time	Rank	Time	Rank
Kang Ji-seok	Men's 50 m	25.29	4 Q	25.17	3rd place, bronze medalist(s)
Kang Ji-seok	Men's 100 m	56.24	11	Did not advance	
Lee Ju-ho	Men's 50 m	25.67	7 Q	25.59	7
Lee Ju-ho	Men's 100 m	55.03	5 Q	54.52	3rd place, bronze medalist(s)
Lee Ju-ho	Men's 200 m	2:01.88	4 Q	1:59.88	5
Park Han-byeol	Women's 50 m	28.69	=4 Q	28.39	5
Shin Young-yeon	Women's 50 m	29.10	8 Q	28.85	7
Shin Young-yeon	Women's 100 m	1:02.57	7 Q	1:02.84	7
Im Da-sol	Women's 100 m	1:02.58	8 Q	1:01.08	5
Im Da-sol	Women's 200 m	2:12.24	3 Q	2:13.66	5

Breaststroke

Athlete	Event	Heats		Final	
Athlete	Event	Time	Rank	Time	Rank
Moon Jae-kwon	Men's 50 m	28.26	11	Did not advance	
Moon Jae-kwon	Men's 100 m	1:01.17	6 Q	1:01.07	6
Kim Jae-youn	Men's 50 m	28.24	10	Did not advance	
Kim Jae-youn	Men's 100 m	1:02.01	9	Did not advance	
Kim Jae-youn	Men's 200 m	2:16.83	=10	Did not advance	
Cho Sung-jae	Men's 200 m	2:14.05	6 Q	2:13.86	6
Back Su-yeon	Women's 50 m	32.34	10	Did not advance	
Back Su-yeon	Women's 100 m	1:09.08	8 Q	1:08.83	7
Back Su-yeon	Women's 200 m	2:30.63	5 Q	2:28.48	5
Kim Hye-jin	Women's 50 m	32.44	11	Did not advance	
Kim Hye-jin	Women's 100 m	1:08.64	6 Q	1:08.34	5
Kim Hye-jin	Women's 200 m	2:36.26	11	Did not advance	

Butterfly

Athlete	Event	Heats		Final	
Athlete	Event	Time	Rank	Time	Rank
Seo Min-suk	Men's 50 m	24.71	14	Did not advance	
Chang Gyu-cheol	Men's 50 m	24.44	11	Did not advance	
Chang Gyu-cheol	Men's 100 m	53.20	6 Q	53.32	7
Chang Gyu-cheol	Men's 200 m	2:01.85	9	Did not advance	
Park Jung-hun	Men's 100 m	54.74	16	Did not advance	
Park Jung-hun	Men's 200 m	2:00.57	8 Q	1:58.67	8
An Se-hyeon	Women's 50 m	27.01	6 Q	26.67	5
An Se-hyeon	Women's 100 m	58.97	3 Q	58.00	3rd place, bronze medalist(s)
An Se-hyeon	Women's 200 m	2:12.22	5 Q	2:08.83	4
Park Ye-rin	Women's 50 m	26.72	4 Q	26.53	4
Park Ye-rin	Women's 100 m	59.57	5 Q	59.57	7
Park Ye-rin	Women's 200 m	2:18.71	10	Did not advance	

Medley

Athlete	Event	Heats		Final	
Athlete	Event	Time	Rank	Time	Rank
Joo Jae-gu	Men's 200 m	2:04.05	10	Did not advance	
Joo Jae-gu	Men's 400 m	4:23.86	7 Q	4:20.77	5
Kim Min-suk	Men's 200 m	2:04.02	9	Did not advance	
Kim Min-suk	Men's 400 m	4:21.95	5 Q	4:23.39	8
Chang Gyu-cheol; Kang Ji-seok; Kim Jae-youn; Lee Ju-ho; Moon Jae-kwon; Park Jung-hun; Park Seon-kwan; Yang Jae-hoon	Men's 4 × 100 m relay	3:41.85	6 Q	3:37.93	5
Kim Seo-yeong	Women's 200 m	2:16.73	5 Q	2:08.34 GR, NR	1st place, gold medalist(s)
Kim Seo-yeong	Women's 400 m	4:48.59	5 Q	4:37.43	2nd place, silver medalist(s)
An Se-hyeon; Back Su-yeon; Im Da-sol; Kim Hye-jin; Kim Min-ju; Ko Mi-so; Park Ye-rin; Shin Young-yeon	Women's 4 × 100 m relay	4:10.94	3 Q	DSQ	
Kang Ji-seok; Kim Jae-youn; Lee Ju-ho; Moon Jae-kwon; An Se-hyeon; Kim Min-ju; Ko Mi-so; Park Ye-rin	Mixed 4 × 100 m relay	3:55.46	3 Q	3:49.27 NR	3rd place, bronze medalist(s)

== Table tennis ==
Individual

Athlete	Event	Round 1	Round 2	Round of 16	Quarterfinals	Semifinals	Final	
Athlete	Event	Opposition Score	Opposition Score	Opposition Score	Opposition Score	Opposition Score	Opposition Score	Rank
Jung Young-sik	Men's singles	Bye	Cheong CC (MAC); W 4–0	N Alamian (IRI); L 3–4	Did not advance			
Lee Sang-su	Men's singles	Bye	S Mosangsinh (LAO); W 4–0	Pak S-h (PRK); W 4–2	Chuang C-y (TPE); W 4–2	Fan ZD (CHN); L 1–4	Did not advance	3rd place, bronze medalist(s)
Jeon Ji-hee	Women's singles	Bye	Ho Y (MAS); W 4–0	Feng TW (SGP); W 4–0	M Kato (JPN); W 4–3	Chen M (CHN); L 0–4	Did not advance	3rd place, bronze medalist(s)
Seo Hyo-won	Women's singles	Bye	R Sintya (INA); W 4–0	Cha H-s (PRK); W 4–1	Wang MY (CHN); L 0–4	Did not advance		
Lee Sang-su; Jeon Ji-hee	Mixed doubles	Bye	MBA Negara / R Sintya (INA); W 2–0^{r}	S Kamal / M Batra (IND); L 2–3	Did not advance			
Lim Jong-hoon; Yang Ha-eun	Mixed doubles	Bye	M Abdulhussein / A Mohamed (QAT); W 3–0	Ma Morizono / Mi Morizono (JPN); W 3–1	Lin GY / Wang MY (CHN); L 0–3	Did not advance		

Team

Athlete	Event	Group Stage					Quarterfinals	Semifinals	Final	
Athlete	Event	Opposition Score	Opposition Score	Opposition Score	Opposition Score	Rank	Opposition Score	Opposition Score	Opposition Score	Rank
Jang Woo-jin; Jung Young-sik; Kim Dong-hyun; Lee Sang-su; Lim Jong-hoon	Men's	Mongolia (MGL); W 3–0	Indonesia (INA); W 3–0	Hong Kong (HKG); W 3–2	Yemen (YEM); W 3–0	1 Q	North Korea (PRK); W 3–2	India (IND); W 3–0	China (CHN); L 0–3	2nd place, silver medalist(s)
Choi Hyo-joo; Jeon Ji-hee; Kim Ji-ho; Seo Hyo-won; Yang Ha-eun	Women's	Indonesia (INA); W 3–0	Chinese Taipei (TPE); W 3–1	Macau (MAC); W 3–0	—N/a	1 Q	Singapore (SGP); W 3–1	China (CHN); L 0–3	Did not advance	3rd place, bronze medalist(s)

== Taekwondo ==
Poomsae

Athlete	Event	Round of 16	Quarterfinals	Semifinals	Final	
Athlete	Event	Opposition Score	Opposition Score	Opposition Score	Opposition Score	Rank
Kang Min-sung	Men's individual	Panyasith (LAO); W 8.24–7.65	Chew (MAS); W 8.35–8.20	Suvittayarak (THA); W 8.70–8.49	Bakhtiar (IRI); W 8.81–8.73	1st place, gold medalist(s)
Han Yeong-hun; Kim Seon-ho; Kang Wan-jin	Men's team	Bye	Indonesia; W 8.68–8.39	Vietnam; W 8.42–8.32	China; W 8.48–8.02	1st place, gold medalist(s)
Yun Ji-hye	Women's individual	Rachana (CAM); W 8.31–7.70	Liao (TPE); W 8.52–8.30	Rosmaniar (INA); L 8.40–8.52	Did not advance	3rd place, bronze medalist(s)
Gwak Yeo-won; Choi Dong-ah; Park Jae-eun	Women's team	Iran; W 8.12–7.95	Vietnam; W 8.24–8.13	Philippines; W 8.02–7.11	Thailand; L 8.20–8.21	2nd place, silver medalist(s)

Kyorugi

Athlete	Event	Round of 32	Round of 16	Quarterfinals	Semifinals	Final	
Athlete	Event	Opposition Score	Opposition Score	Opposition Score	Opposition Score	Opposition Score	Rank
Kim Tae-hun	Men's −58 kg	Bye					
Cho Gang-min	Men's −63 kg	Bye					
Lee Dae-hoon	Men's −68 kg	Bye					
Lee Hwa-jun	Men's −80 kg	Wangchuk (BHU)					
Lee Seung-hwan	Men's +80 kg	—N/a	Rajabi (IRI)				
Kang Bo-ra	Women's −49 kg	Bye	Ana Bello (TLS)				
Ha Min-ah	Women's −53 kg	Bye					
Lee Ah-reum	Women's −57 kg	Bye					
Kim Jan-di	Women's −67 kg	—N/a					
Lee Da-bin	Women's +67 kg	—N/a	Bye				

== Tennis ==
Men

Athlete	Event	Round of 64	Round of 32	Round of 16	Quarterfinals	Semifinals	Final	
Athlete	Event	Opposition Score	Opposition Score	Opposition Score	Opposition Score	Opposition Score	Opposition Score	Rank
Kwon Soon-woo	Singles	Bye	AJ Tang (HKG); W 6–0, 6–1	Yang T-h (TPE); W 2–6, 6–0, 6–3	P Gunneswaran (IND); L 7–6^{7–2}, 4–6, 6–7^{8–10}	Did not advance		
Lee Duck-hee	Singles	Bye	MAAK Akbar (PAK); W 6–4, 6–2	D Yevseyev (KAZ); W 7–6^{7–4}, 6–2	J Jung (TPE); W 6–3, 7–5	Wu YB (CHN); L 3–6, 6–3, 5–7	Did not advance	3rd place, bronze medalist(s)
Hong Seong-chan; Lee Jea-moon	Doubles	Phạm MT / Trịnh LG (VIE); W 6–2, 6–2	Sa Ratiwatana / So Ratiwatana (THA); W 7–6^{7–4}, 6–4	F Dustov / D Istomin (UZB); W 6–3, 7–6^{10–8}	Y Ito / Y Watanuki (JPN); L 3–6, 7–5, [2–10]	Did not advance		
Kwon Soon-woo; Lim Yong-kyu	Doubles	Bye	AJ Tang / Wong H-k (HKG); W 6–1, 5–7, [10–7]	Gong MX / Zhang Z (CHN); L 5–7, 5–7	Did not advance			

Women

Athlete	Event	Round of 64	Round of 32	Round of 16	Quarterfinals	Semifinals	Final	
Athlete	Event	Opposition Score	Opposition Score	Opposition Score	Opposition Score	Opposition Score	Opposition Score	Rank
Han Na-lae	Singles	Bye	Lý-Nguyễn S (VIE); W 6–2, 6–1	N Abduraimova (UZB); W 6–2, 6–2	Zhang SA (CHN); L 3–6, 3–6	Did not advance		
Jeong Su-nam	Singles	S Sadeghvaziri (IRI); W 6–0, 6–0	Wang Q (CHN); L 4–6, 1–6	Did not advance				
Han Na-lae; Kim Na-ri	Doubles	—N/a	TMA Kurera / A Seneviratne (SRI); W 6–1, 6–0	C Fodor / Lý-Nguyễn S (VIE); W 6–1, 6–0	M Kato / M Ninomiya (JPN); L 3–6, 3–6	Did not advance		
Kang Seo-kyung; Lee So-ra	Doubles	—N/a	N Abduraimova / A Amanmuradova (UZB); W 7–6^{7–5}, 5–7, [10–8]	Duan YY / Wang YF (CHN); L 2–6, 4–6	Did not advance			

Mixed

Athlete	Event	Round of 64	Round of 32	Round of 16	Quarterfinals	Semifinals	Final	
Athlete	Event	Opposition Score	Opposition Score	Opposition Score	Opposition Score	Opposition Score	Opposition Score	Rank
Choi Ji-hee; Kim Young-seok	Doubles	J Rompies / DA Susanto (INA); W 7–5, 6–1	M Ninomiya / Y Uchiyama (JPN); L 5–7, 7–6^{9–7}, [6–10]	Did not advance				
Kim Na-ri; Lee Jea-moon	Doubles	A Moosa Kaleem / AF Fazeel (MDV); W 6–1, 6–0	A Raina / R Bopanna (IND); L 3–6, 6–2, [9–11]	Did not advance				

== Triathlon ==
South Korea entered their triathletes to compete at the Games.

Individual

Athlete	Event	Swim (1.5 km)	Trans 1	Bike (39.6 km)	Trans 2	Run (10 km)	Total time	Rank
Heo Min-ho	Men's	20:02	0:28	56:42	0:24	36:45	1:54:21	9
Kim Ji-hwan	Men's	18:49	0:26	56:35	0:22		DNF	–
Jang Yun-jung	Women's	19:17	0:27	1:03:09	0:19	39:23	2:02:25	5
Jeong Hye-rim	Women's	20:17	0:26	1:02:08	0:22		DNF	–

Mixed relay

Athlete	Event	Total times per athlete (Swim 300 m, Bike 6.3 km, Run 2.1 km)	Total group time	Rank
Heo Min-ho; Jang Yun-jung; Kim Ji-hwan; Park Ye-jin	Mixed relay	22:11; 23:37; 22:07; 24:56	1:32:51	2nd place, silver medalist(s)

== Volleyball ==
=== Beach volleyball ===
Athlete	Event	Preliminary		Round of 16	Quarterfinals	Semifinals	Final / BM	
Athlete	Event	Oppositions Scores	Rank	Opposition Score	Opposition Score	Opposition Score	Opposition Score	Rank
Kim Jun-young; Kim Hong-chan	Men's tournament	Yapa / Pradeep (SRI): L 0–2; Janko / Samba (QAT): L 0–2; Yakovlev / Bogatu (KAZ): L 0–2	4	Did not advance				
Kim Hyun-ji; Kim Ha-na	Women's tournament	Wang / Xia (CHN): L 0–2; Kou / Liu (TPE): L 0–2; Yuen / Au Yeung (HKG): L 0–2	4	Did not advance				

=== Indoor volleyball ===
Team	Event	Group Stage		Playoffs	Quarterfinals	Semifinals / Pl.	Final / BM / Pl.	
Team	Event	Oppositions Scores	Rank	Opposition Score	Opposition Score	Opposition Score	Opposition Score	Rank
South Korea men's	Men's tournament	Chinese Taipei: W 3–2; Nepal: W 3–0	1 Q	Pakistan; W 3–0	Indonesia; W 3–0	Chinese Taipei; W 3–2	Iran; L 0–3	2nd place, silver medalist(s)
South Korea women's	Women's tournament	India: W 3–0; Kazakhstan: W 3–1; China: L 0–3; Vietnam: W 3–0; Chinese Taipei: W 3–0	2 Q	—N/a	Indonesia; W 3–0	Thailand; L 1–3	Japan; W 3–1	3rd place, bronze medalist(s)

==== Men's tournament ====
Roster

The following is the South Korean roster in the men's volleyball tournament of the 2018 Asian Games.

Head coach: Kim Ho-chul

No.	Name	Date of birth	Height	Weight	Spike	Block	Club
1	Song Myung-geun	12 March 1993	1.96 m (6 ft 5 in)	85 kg (187 lb)	315 cm (124 in)	305 cm (120 in)	(South Korea) OK Savings Bank
2	Han Sun-soo (c)	16 December 1985	1.89 m (6 ft 2 in)	80 kg (180 lb)	310 cm (120 in)	297 cm (117 in)	(South Korea) Korean Airlines
3	Seo Jae-duck	21 July 1989	1.94 m (6 ft 4 in)	94 kg (207 lb)	315 cm (124 in)	305 cm (120 in)	(South Korea) KEPCO 45
4	Jeong Min-su	5 October 1991	1.78 m (5 ft 10 in)	75 kg (165 lb)	300 cm (120 in)	290 cm (110 in)	(South Korea) Woori Card
5	Bu Yong-chan	30 November 1989	1.75 m (5 ft 9 in)	70 kg (150 lb)	305 cm (120 in)	300 cm (120 in)	(South Korea) Samsung Fire & Marine Insurance
6	Lee Min-gyu	3 December 1992	1.94 m (6 ft 4 in)	78 kg (172 lb)	305 cm (120 in)	295 cm (116 in)	(South Korea) OK Savings Bank
7	Kim Kyu-min	28 December 1990	1.99 m (6 ft 6 in)	92 kg (203 lb)	320 cm (130 in)	310 cm (120 in)	(South Korea) Samsung Fire & Marine Insurance
8	Na Gyeong-bok	8 April 1994	1.95 m (6 ft 5 in)	78 kg (172 lb)	320 cm (130 in)	315 cm (124 in)	(South Korea) Woori Card
9	Kwak Seung-suk	23 March 1988	1.90 m (6 ft 3 in)	81 kg (179 lb)	325 cm (128 in)	320 cm (130 in)	(South Korea) Korean Airlines
10	Jung Ji-seok	10 March 1995	1.94 m (6 ft 4 in)	87 kg (192 lb)	310 cm (120 in)	300 cm (120 in)	(South Korea) Korean Airlines
11	Choi Min-ho	28 April 1988	1.98 m (6 ft 6 in)	86 kg (190 lb)	330 cm (130 in)	312 cm (123 in)	(South Korea) Hyundai Capital
12	Jeon Kwang-in	18 September 1991	1.94 m (6 ft 4 in)	82 kg (181 lb)	310 cm (120 in)	300 cm (120 in)	(South Korea) KEPCO 45
15	Moon Sung-min	14 September 1986	1.98 m (6 ft 6 in)	89 kg (196 lb)	329 cm (130 in)	321 cm (126 in)	(South Korea) Hyundai Capital
19	Kim Jae-hwi	6 September 1993	2.04 m (6 ft 8 in)	85 kg (187 lb)	330 cm (130 in)	320 cm (130 in)	(South Korea) Hyundai Capital

Pool D

Pos	Team	Pld	W	L	Pts	SW	SL	SR	SPW	SPL	SPR	Qualification
1	South Korea	2	2	0	5	6	2	3.000	184	147	1.252	Classification for 1–12
2	Chinese Taipei	2	1	1	4	5	3	1.667	179	166	1.078	Classification for 1–12
3	Nepal	2	0	2	0	0	6	0.000	100	150	0.667	Classification for 13–20

Source: OCA

Date	Time		Score		Set 1	Set 2	Set 3	Set 4	Set 5	Total	Report
20 Aug	19:00	Chinese Taipei	2–3	South Korea	21–25	25–21	21–25	25–23	12–15	104–109	Report
24 Aug	16:30	South Korea	3–0	Nepal	25–16	25–13	25–14			75–43	Report
26 Aug	10:00	South Korea	3–0	Pakistan	25–19	25–22	25–17			75–58	Report
28 Aug	16:30	Indonesia	0–3	South Korea	22–25	18–25	18–25			58–75	Report
30 Aug	16:30	Chinese Taipei	2–3	South Korea	25–20	20–25	16–25	25–20	12–15	98–105	Report
01 Sep	19:00	South Korea	0–3	Iran	17–25	22–25	21–25			60–75	Report

==== Women's tournament ====
Roster

The following is the South Korean roster in the women's volleyball tournament of the 2018 Asian Games.

Head coach: Cha Hae-won

No.	Name	Date of birth	Height	Weight	Spike	Block	Club
1	Park Eun-jin(MB)	15 December 1999	1.88 m (6 ft 2 in)	72 kg (159 lb)	295 cm (116 in)	280 cm (110 in)	(South Korea) Sunmyung Girls' High School
2	Lee Ju-ah (MB)	21 August 2000	1.85 m (6 ft 1 in)	70 kg (150 lb)	280 cm (110 in)	280 cm (110 in)	(South Korea) Heungkuk Life Insurance
3	Jung Ho-young (MB)	23 August 2001	1.89 m (6 ft 2 in)	66 kg (146 lb)	285 cm (112 in)	260 cm (100 in)	(South Korea) Sunmyung Girls' High School
4	Hwang Min-kyoung (OH / OP)	2 June 1990	1.74 m (5 ft 9 in)	64 kg (141 lb)	290 cm (110 in)	282 cm (111 in)	(South Korea) Hyundai Construction
5	Lee Hyo-hee (S)	9 September 1980	1.73 m (5 ft 8 in)	57 kg (126 lb)	280 cm (110 in)	271 cm (107 in)	(South Korea) Korea Expressway Corporation
8	Yim Myung-ok (L)	5 May 1986	1.75 m (5 ft 9 in)	60 kg (130 lb)	278 cm (109 in)	266 cm (105 in)	(South Korea) Korea Expressway Corporation
10	Kim Yeon-koung (C)	26 February 1988	1.92 m (6 ft 4 in)	73 kg (161 lb)	350 cm (140 in)	340 cm (130 in)	(Turkey) Eczacıbaşı VitrA
11	Kim Su-ji (MB)	11 July 1987	1.86 m (6 ft 1 in)	68 kg (150 lb)	335 cm (132 in)	320 cm (130 in)	(South Korea) Hwaseong IBK Altos
13	Park Jeong-ah (OH)	26 March 1993	1.87 m (6 ft 2 in)	73 kg (161 lb)	300 cm (120 in)	290 cm (110 in)	(South Korea) Korea Expressway Corporation
14	Yang Hyo-jin (MB)	14 December 1989	1.90 m (6 ft 3 in)	72 kg (159 lb)	340 cm (130 in)	338 cm (133 in)	(South Korea) Hyundai Construction
15	Kang So-hwi (OH)	18 July 1997	1.80 m (5 ft 11 in)	68 kg (150 lb)	295 cm (116 in)	278 cm (109 in)	(South Korea) GS Caltex
17	Lee Jae-yeong (OH)	15 October 1996	1.79 m (5 ft 10 in)	63 kg (139 lb)	286 cm (113 in)	267 cm (105 in)	(South Korea) Heungkuk Life Insurance
19	Lee Da-yeong (S)	15 October 1996	1.79 m (5 ft 10 in)	62 kg (137 lb)	282 cm (111 in)	263 cm (104 in)	(South Korea) Hyundai Construction
20	Na Hyun-jung (L)	10 March 1990	1.63 m (5 ft 4 in)	54 kg (119 lb)	257 cm (101 in)	250 cm (98 in)	(South Korea) GS Caltex

Pool B

Pos	Team	Pld	W	L	Pts	SW	SL	SR	SPW	SPL	SPR	Qualification
1	China	5	5	0	15	15	0	MAX	375	216	1.736	Quarterfinals
2	South Korea	5	4	1	12	12	4	3.000	382	299	1.278	Quarterfinals
3	Kazakhstan	5	2	3	7	9	10	0.900	386	406	0.951	Quarterfinals
4	Vietnam	5	2	3	6	8	11	0.727	369	406	0.909	Quarterfinals
5	Chinese Taipei	5	2	3	4	7	13	0.538	370	441	0.839	Classification for 9–11
6	India	5	0	5	1	2	15	0.133	292	406	0.719	Classification for 9–11

Source: OCA

Date	Time		Score		Set 1	Set 2	Set 3	Set 4	Set 5	Total	Report
19 Aug	16:30	South Korea	3–0	India	25–17	25–11	25–13			75–41	Report
21 Aug	12:30	South Korea	3–1	Kazakhstan	25–9	25–14	28–30	25–20		103–73	Report
23 Aug	16:30	South Korea	0–3	China	21–25	16–25	16–25			53–75	Report
25 Aug	12:30	Vietnam	0–3	South Korea	20–25	15–25	19–25			54–75	Report
27 Aug	19:00	Chinese Taipei	0–3	South Korea	24–26	9–25	23–25			56–76	Report
29 Aug	16:30	Indonesia	0–3	South Korea	22–25	13–25	18–25			53–75	Report
31 Aug	17:00	Thailand	3–1	South Korea	25–15	25–20	20–25	25–22		95–82	Report
01 Sep	12:30	South Korea	3–1	Japan	25–18	21–25	25–15	27–25		98–83	Report

== Water polo ==
Key:

- FT – After full-time.
- P – Match decided by penalty-shootout.

Team	Event	Group Stage				Quarterfinals	Semifinals / Pl.	Final / BM / Pl.	
Team	Event	Opposition Score	Opposition Score	Opposition Score	Rank	Opposition Score	Opposition Score	Opposition Score	Rank
South Korea men's	Men's tournament	Kazakhstan; L 9–16	Iran; L 11–16	Singapore; W 10–7	3 Q	China; L 4–12	Indonesia; W 15–7	Singapore; W 12–10	5

=== Men's tournament ===
Roster

Head coach: Kim Jung-yeoul

1. Lee Seung-hun (GK)
2. Park Jeong-min (CB)
3. Yoo Byeong-jin (D)
4. Lee Seo-nuk (D) (C)
5. Youn Young-gwan (CF)
6. Choi Jin-jae (D)
7. Kim Dong-hyeok (D)
8. Kim Moon-soo (D)
9. Chu Min-jong (D)
10. Han Hyo-min (D)
11. Gwon Dae-yong (D)
12. Lee Seong-gyu (D)
13. Jung Byeong-young (GK)

Group A

Pos	Team	Pld	W	D	L	GF	GA	GD	Pts	Qualification
1	Kazakhstan	3	3	0	0	40	18	+22	6	Quarterfinals
2	Iran	3	2	0	1	32	25	+7	4	Quarterfinals
3	South Korea	3	1	0	2	30	39	−9	2	Quarterfinals
4	Singapore	3	0	0	3	16	36	−20	0	Quarterfinals

Source: OCA

25 August; 9:00	South Korea	9–16	Kazakhstan	Gelora Bung Karno Aquatic Stadium, Jakarta; Referees: Ni (CHN), Tahara (JPN)
25 August; 9:00	Score by quarters: 1–5, 1–5, 3–3, 4–3			Gelora Bung Karno Aquatic Stadium, Jakarta; Referees: Ni (CHN), Tahara (JPN)
25 August; 9:00	Kim D. 3	Goals	Ruday 3	Gelora Bung Karno Aquatic Stadium, Jakarta; Referees: Ni (CHN), Tahara (JPN)

26 August; 17:10	Iran	16–11	South Korea	Gelora Bung Karno Aquatic Stadium, Jakarta; Referees: Alexandrescu (ROU), Stavridis (GRE)
26 August; 17:10	Score by quarters: 5–3, 7–4, 1–2, 3–2			Gelora Bung Karno Aquatic Stadium, Jakarta; Referees: Alexandrescu (ROU), Stavridis (GRE)
26 August; 17:10	Malek-Khanbanan, Almasi 3	Goals	Youn, Lee S.G. 3	Gelora Bung Karno Aquatic Stadium, Jakarta; Referees: Alexandrescu (ROU), Stavridis (GRE)

29 August; 14:30	Singapore	7–10	South Korea	Gelora Bung Karno Aquatic Stadium, Jakarta; Referees: Štampalija (CRO), Tahara (JPN)
29 August; 14:30	Score by quarters: 1–2, 1–4, 2–2, 3–2			Gelora Bung Karno Aquatic Stadium, Jakarta; Referees: Štampalija (CRO), Tahara (JPN)
29 August; 14:30	Koh 2	Goals	Chu 3	Gelora Bung Karno Aquatic Stadium, Jakarta; Referees: Štampalija (CRO), Tahara (JPN)

Quarterfinal

30 August; 10:20	South Korea	4–12	China	Gelora Bung Karno Aquatic Stadium, Jakarta; Referees: Flahive (AUS), Safabakhsh (IRI)
30 August; 10:20	Score by quarters: 1–3, 1–2, 1–5, 1–2			Gelora Bung Karno Aquatic Stadium, Jakarta; Referees: Flahive (AUS), Safabakhsh (IRI)
30 August; 10:20	Chu 2	Goals	Chen Z. 4	Gelora Bung Karno Aquatic Stadium, Jakarta; Referees: Flahive (AUS), Safabakhsh (IRI)

5th–8th place semifinal

31 August; 10:20	South Korea	15–7	Indonesia	Gelora Bung Karno Aquatic Stadium, Jakarta; Referees: Tahara (JPN), Salnichenko (KAZ)
31 August; 10:20	Score by quarters: 4–2, 3–3, 5–1, 3–1			Gelora Bung Karno Aquatic Stadium, Jakarta; Referees: Tahara (JPN), Salnichenko (KAZ)
31 August; 10:20	Park 6	Goals	Firdaus, Harahap 2	Gelora Bung Karno Aquatic Stadium, Jakarta; Referees: Tahara (JPN), Salnichenko (KAZ)

5th place match

1 September; 10:20	Singapore	10–12 (PSO)	South Korea	Gelora Bung Karno Aquatic Stadium, Jakarta; Referees: Safabakhsh (IRI), Ni (CHN)
1 September; 10:20	Score by quarters: 4–3, 1–3, 1–1, 2–1 PSO: 2–4			Gelora Bung Karno Aquatic Stadium, Jakarta; Referees: Safabakhsh (IRI), Ni (CHN)
1 September; 10:20	Koh 4	Goals	Park 5	Gelora Bung Karno Aquatic Stadium, Jakarta; Referees: Safabakhsh (IRI), Ni (CHN)

== Weightlifting ==
Men

Athlete	Event	Snatch		Clean & Jerk		Total	Rank
Athlete	Event	Result	Rank	Result	Rank	Total	Rank
Won Jeong-sik	−69 kg	145	4	~~186~~	—	—	—
Kim Woo-jae	−77 kg	160	1	187	2	347	2nd place, silver medalist(s)
You Jae-sik	−77 kg	150	5	180	6	330	4
Jang Yeon-hak	−85 kg	165	1	195	2	360	2nd place, silver medalist(s)
Lim Young-chul	−85 kg	155	5	190	4	345	5
Han Jung-hoon	−94 kg	160	6	207	4	367	4
Jeong Ki-sam	−105 kg	180	4	215	5	395	4
Seo Hui-yeop	−105 kg	174	5	220	3	394	5

Women

Athlete	Event	Snatch		Clean & Jerk		Total	Rank
Athlete	Event	Result	Rank	Result	Rank	Total	Rank
Ham Eun-ji	−58 kg	85	6	118	5	203	6
Kim Ye-ra	−63 kg	90	4	110	5	200	5
Mun Yu-ra	−69 kg	101	3	130	2	231	3rd place, bronze medalist(s)
Kim Su-hyeon	−69 kg	97	5	130	2	227	4
Mun Min-hee	−75 kg	106	2	130	3	236	3rd place, bronze medalist(s)
Son Young-hee	+75 kg	122	2	160	2	282	2nd place, silver medalist(s)
Lee Hui-sol	+75 kg	122	2	157	4	279	4

== Wrestling ==
Key:

- F – Victory by fall.
- PP – Decision by points – the loser with technical points.
- PO – Decision by points – the loser without technical points.
- ST – Great superiority – the loser without technical points and a margin of victory of at least 8 (Greco-Roman) or 10 (freestyle) points.

Men's freestyle

Athlete	Event	Qualification	Round of 16	Quarterfinals	Semifinals	Repechage 1	Repechage 2	Final / BM	
Athlete	Event	Opposition Result	Opposition Result	Opposition Result	Opposition Result	Opposition Result	Opposition Result	Opposition Result	Rank
Kim Sung-gwon	−57 kg	Smanbekov (KGZ); W 7–6	Bekhbayar (MGL); L 0–4^{F}	Did not advance		Vohidov (TJK); W 9–0	Shavkatov (UZB); W 5–1	Atri (IRI); L 4–9	5
Lee Seung-chul	−65 kg	Nguyễn (VIE); W 10–4	Okassov (KAZ); L 0–9^{F}	Did not advance					12
Gong Byung-min	−74 kg	Bye	Wang (TPE); W 14–4	Dzhalilov (TJK); W 7–6	Kaisanov (KAZ); L 8–12	Bye		A Ibrahim (QAT); W 10–0	3rd place, bronze medalist(s)
Kim Gwan-uk	−86 kg	Bye	Gamidgadzhiev (KGZ); L 0–10	Did not advance					14
Kim Jae-gang	−97 kg	—N/a	Toruan (INA); W 10–0	Batzul (MGL); W 3–2	Musaev (KGZ); L 1–1 ^{PP}	Bye	—N/a	Ahmadi (AFG); W 3–0	3rd place, bronze medalist(s)
Nam Koung-jin	−125 kg	—N/a	Bye	Belliýew (TKM); W 12–0	Deng (CHN); L 0–6^{F}	Bye	—N/a	Raza (PAK); W 9–0	3rd place, bronze medalist(s)

Men's Greco-Roman

Athlete	Event	Round of 16	Quarterfinals	Semifinals	Repechage	Final / BM	
Athlete	Event	Opposition Result	Opposition Result	Opposition Result	Opposition Result	Opposition Result	Rank
Kim Seung-hak	−60 kg	Mardani (IRI); L 3–7	Did not advance				9
Ryu Han-su	−67 kg	Deemark (THA); W 8–0	Ismailov (KGZ); W 1–1 ^{PP}	Zhang (CHN); W 2–0	Bye	Kebispayev (KAZ); W 5–4	1st place, gold medalist(s)
Kim Hyeon-woo	−77 kg	Makhmudov (KGZ); L 3–7	Did not advance		Nalgiev (UZB); WO	Permanow (TKM); W 9–0	3rd place, bronze medalist(s)
Park Hae-geun	−87 kg	Singh (IND); L 1–4	Did not advance				11
Cho Hyo-chul	−97 kg	Bye	Iskakov (KAZ); W 6–1	Heidari (IRI); W 4–3	Bye	Xiao (CHN); W 5–4	1st place, gold medalist(s)
Kim Min-seok	−130 kg	Abdullaev (UZB); L 0–7	Did not advance		Azizov (TJK); W 8–0	Mehdizadeh (IRI); W 1–1 ^{PP}	3rd place, bronze medalist(s)

Women's freestyle

Athlete	Event	Round of 16	Quarterfinals	Semifinals	Repechage	Final / BM	
Athlete	Event	Opposition Result	Opposition Result	Opposition Result	Opposition Result	Opposition Result	Rank
Kim Hyung-joo	−50 kg	Bye	Phogat (IND); L 0–11	Did not advance	Sun (CHN); W 4^{F}–0	Yakhshimuratova (UZB); W 6–0	3rd place, bronze medalist(s)
Lee Shin-hye	−53 kg	Eshimova (KAZ); L 6–11	Did not advance		Virangsa (THA); W 8–0	Sumiyaa (MGL); L 2–3^{F}	5
Um Ji-eun	−57 kg	Bye	Pei (CHN); L 4–5^{F}	Did not advance	Bye	Battsetseg (MGL); L 2–5	5
Hang Jung-won	−62 kg	Bye	Kawai (JPN); L 1–12	Did not advance			8
Jang Eun-sil	−68 kg	Nguyễn (VIE); W 6–2	Zhumanazarova (KGZ); L 0–10	Did not advance			7
Hwang Eun-ju	−76 kg	Bye	Chang (TPE); W 4–4 ^{PP}	Zhou (CHN); L 0–10	—N/a	Syzdykova (KAZ); L 2–5	5

== Wushu ==
Taolu

Athlete	Event	Event 1		Event 2		Total	Rank
Athlete	Event	Result	Rank	Result	Rank	Total	Rank
Lee Ha-sung	Men's changquan	9.31	12	—N/a		9.31	12
Lee Yong-mun	Men's nanquan and nangun	9.69	4	9.71	2	19.40	3rd place, bronze medalist(s)
Yun Dong-hae	Men's nanquan and nangun	9.48	14	9.44	15	18.92	14
Yu Won-hee	Men's taijiquan and taijijian	9.70	2	9.69	5	19.39	4
Seo Hee-seong	Men's taijiquan and taijijian	9.68	8	9.69	5	19.37	6
Cho Seung-jae	Men's daoshu and gunshu	9.72	2	9.73	2	19.45	2nd place, silver medalist(s)
Seo Hee-ju	Women's jianshu and qiangshu	DNS	—	DNS	—	—	

Sanda

Athlete	Event	Round of 32	Round of 16	Quarterfinals	Semifinals	Final	
Athlete	Event	Opposition Score	Opposition Score	Opposition Score	Opposition Score	Opposition Score	Rank
Hong Min-jun	Men's −56 kg	Bye	Ahmed (PAK); W 2–0	Widiyanto (INA); L 1–2	Did not advance		
Jo Sung-hyun	Men's −60 kg	Bye	Khaliq (PAK); W 2–0	Ahangarian (IRI); L 1–2	Did not advance		
Park Seung-mo	Men's −65 kg	—N/a	Khunphet (THA); W 2–0	Li (CHN); L 1–2	Did not advance		
Ham Gwan-sik	Men's −70 kg	—N/a	Thakuri (NEP); W 2–0	Keldeibai (KGZ); W 2–0	Mohammadseifi (IRI); L 0–2	Did not advance	3rd place, bronze medalist(s)
Kim Woo-jeonung	Women's −52 kg	—N/a	Kaewcha (THA); L 0–2	Did not advance			

Key:

- TV – Technical victory.

== See also ==
- South Korea at the 2018 Asian Para Games
