= Thailand at the 2018 Asian Games =

- IOC code: THA
- NOC: National Olympic Committee of Thailand
- Website: www.olympicthai.or.th (in Thai and English)

in Jakarta and Palembang
- Competitors: 830 in 42 sports
- Flag bearer: Pleumjit Thinkaow (opening)
- Medals Ranked 12th: Gold 11 Silver 16 Bronze 46 Total 73

Asian Games appearances (overview)
- 1951; 1954; 1958; 1962; 1966; 1970; 1974; 1978; 1982; 1986; 1990; 1994; 1998; 2002; 2006; 2010; 2014; 2018; 2022; 2026

Thailand participated in the 2018 Asian Games in Jakarta and Palembang, Indonesia as a competing nation, from 18 August to 2 September 2018. This is the nation's eighteenth appearance at the Asian Games, since the inaugural games in New Delhi.

== Background ==
=== Arrangement ===
Thana Chaiprasit or Big Tom is set to be the chef de mission of Thailand in the 2018 Asian Games, after being the chef de mission of Thailand in previous Olympic Games, Asian Games and Southeast Asian Games.

Thailand participated at the test of event of the Games with 92 athletes and 33 officials from Athletic, Basketball, Boxing, Pencak silat, Weightlifting and Archery in February 2018, and in August 2018, the country will send 830 athletes (445 male and 385 female).

=== Target ===
Sakol Wannapong or "Big Seu", Governor of the Sports Authority of Thailand set the target for the Thailand Asian Games team to be awarded 20 gold medals and no less than Incheon games (12 gold medals). According to Somphorn Wannasriri, Director of Sports Science Department on behalf of Sports Authority of Thailand (SAT), the country is aim to win 17 gold, 15 silver, and 28 bronze medals from 46 sport disciplines.

Key	✗ Target missed	✓ Target met	✓ ✓ Target exceeded

Sport	Medals target set	Medals or result	Target missed, met, or exceeded
Cycling	1	3	✓ ✓

=== Media coverage ===
The Workpoint Entertainment is the first private who hold the broadcast rights of the 2018 Asian Games in Thailand. They will live the opening ceremony until the closing ceremony in Gelora Bung Karno Stadium, by 4 platforms including Workpoint TV, Workpoint Facebook Fanpage, Workpoint YouTube Channel and Workpoint Line Account.

== Medal summary ==
=== Medals by sport ===
Medals by sport
Sport	Gold	Silver	Bronze	Total
Sepak takraw	4	0	0	4
Paragliding	2	1	1	4
Taekwondo	2	0	2	4
Cycling	1	2	3	6
Jet ski	1	2	2	5
Shooting	1	1	0	1
Athletics	0	3	1	4
Pencak silat	0	2	5	7
Weightlifting	0	1	6	7
Boxing	0	1	5	6
Contract bridge	0	1	1	2
Tennis	0	1	0	1
Volleyball	0	1	0	1
Canoeing	0	0	2	4
Rowing	0	0	3	3
Sailing	0	0	3	3
Equestrian	0	0	2	2
Judo	0	0	2	2
3-on-3 basketball	0	0	1	1
Badminton	0	0	1	1
Ju-jitsu	0	0	1	1
Kabaddi	0	0	1	1
Karate	0	0	1	1
Wushu	0	0	1	1
Total	11	16	44	71

=== Medals by day ===
Medals by day
Day	Date	1st place, gold medalist(s)	2nd place, silver medalist(s)	3rd place, bronze medalist(s)	Total
1	August 19	1	0	1	2
2	August 20	0	1	3	4
3	August 21	0	0	4	4
4	August 22	3	1	1	5
5	August 23	2	2	7	11
6	August 24	0	0	4	4
7	August 25	2	4	4	10
8	August 26	1	1	7	9
9	August 27	0	1	2	3
10	August 28	0	1	0	1
11	August 29	0	2	3	5
12	August 30	0	1	0	1
13	August 31	1	0	9	10
14	September 1	1	2	1	4
15	September 2	0	0	0	0
Total		11	16	46	73

=== Medalists ===
The following Thailand competitors won medals at the Games.

Medal	Name	Sport	Event	Date
Gold	Kotchawan Chomchuen; Phenkanya Phaisankiattikun; Ornawee Srisahakit	Taekwondo	Women's team poomsae	19 August
Gold	Chantika Chaisanuk; Narubhorn Wathaya; Nunnapat Phuchong	Paragliding	Women's team accuracy	22 August
Gold	Thailand men's national sepak takraw team: Anuwat Chaichana; Siriwat Sakha; Thawisak Thongsai; Pornchai Kaokaew; Pattarapong Yupadee; Assadin Wongyota; Thanawat Chumsena; Rachan Viphan; Sittipong Khamchan; Jirasak Pakbuangoen; Kritsanapong Nontakote; Jantarit Khukaeo	Sepak takraw	Men's team regu	22 August
Gold	Thailand women's national sepak takraw team: Masaya Duangsri; Suputtra Beartong; Thitima Mahakusol; Kaewjai Pumsawangkaew; Sasiwimol Janthasit; Thidarat Soda; Fueangfa Praphatsarang; Nisa Thanaattawut; Nipaporn Salupphon; Somruedee Pruepruk; Payom Srihongsa; Wiphada Chitphuan	Sepak takraw	Women's team regu	22 August
Gold	Nunnapat Phuchong	Paragliding	Women's individual accuracy	23 August
Gold	Panipak Wongpattanakit	Taekwondo	Women's 49 kg	23 August
Gold	Thailand men's national sepak takraw team: Anuwat Chaichana; Seksan Tubtong; Pornchai Kaokaew; Wichan Temkort; Pattarapong Yupadee; Assadin Wongyota; Rachan Viphan; Jirasak Pakbuangoen; Suriyon Koonpimon	Sepak takraw	Men's team doubles	25 August
Gold	Attapon Kunsa	Jet ski	Runabout 1100 stock	25 August
Gold	Sutiya Jiewchaloemmit	Shooting	Women's skeet	26 August
Gold	Jai Angsuthasawit	Cycling	Men's keirin	31 August
Gold	Thailand women's national sepak takraw team: Masaya Duangsri; Sasiwimol Janthasit; Fueangfa Praphatsarang; Somruedee Pruepruk; Payom Srihongsa; Wiphada Chitphuan	Sepak takraw	Women's quadrant	1 September
Silver	Vipavee Deekaballes	Cycling	Women's downhill	20 August
Silver	Naphaswan Yangpaiboon	Shooting	Women's 25 metre pistol	22 August
Silver	Jirasak Witeetham	Paragliding	Men's individual accuracy	23 August
Silver	Sukanya Srisurat	Weightlifting	Women's 58 kg	23 August
Silver	Chutikan Kitwanitsathian	Cycling	Women's BMX race	25 August
Silver	Kasidit Teeraprateep	Jet ski	Ski modified	25 August
Silver	Phadit Buree	Jet ski	Runabout 1100 stock	25 August
Silver	Luksika Kumkhum; Sonchat Ratiwatana	Tennis	Mixed doubles	25 August
Silver	Sutthisak Singkhon	Athletics	Men's decathlon	26 August
Silver	Taristchollatorn Chodchoy; Chodchoy Sophonpanich; Kanokporn Janebunjong; Terasak Jitngamkusol; Somchai Baisamut; Kridsadayut Plengsap	Contract bridge	Mixed team	27 August
Silver	Chayanisa Chomchuendee	Athletics	Women's pole vault	28 August
Silver	Ilyas Sadara	Pencak silat	Men's singles	29 August
Silver	Saowanee Chanthamunee; Oraya Choosuwan	Pencak silat	Women's doubles	29 August
Silver	Parinya Chuaimaroeng	Athletics	Women's triple jump	30 August
Silver	Sudaporn Seesondee	Boxing	Women's 60 kg	1 September
Silver	Thailand women's national volleyball team: Piyanut Pannoy; Pornpun Guedpard; Thatdao Nuekjang; Pleumjit Thinkaow; Onuma Sittirak; Hattaya Bamrungsuk; Wilavan Apinyapong; Nootsara Tomkom; Chitaporn Kamlangmak; Malika Kanthong; Pimpichaya Kokram; Ajcharaporn Kongyot; Chatchu-on Moksri; Supattra Pairoj	Volleyball	Women's tournament	1 September
Bronze	Pongporn Suvittayarak	Taekwondo	Men's individual poomsae	19 August
Bronze	Suebsakun Sukchanya	Cycling	Men's downhill	20 August
Bronze	Arinadtha Chavatanont; Apisada Bannagijsophon; Chalermcharn Yotviriyapanit; Pakjira Thongpakdi	Equestrian	Team dressage	20 August
Bronze	Thunya Sukcharoen	Weightlifting	Women's 48 kg	20 August
Bronze	Natalie Panyawan	Cycling	Women's cross-country	21 August
Bronze	Surodchana Khambao	Weightlifting	Women's 53 kg	21 August
Bronze	Thailand women's national badminton team: Busanan Ongbamrungphan; Chayanit Chaladchalam; Jongkolphan Kititharakul; Nitchaon Jindapol; Phataimas Muenwong; Pornpawee Chochuwong; Puttita Supajirakul; Ratchanok Intanon; Rawinda Prajongjai; Sapsiree Taerattanachai	Badminton	Women's team	21 August
Bronze	Vipawan Siripornpermsak	Taekwondo	Women's −57 kg	21 August
Bronze	Sarayut Chinpongsatorn; Tanapat Luangiam; Mongkut Preecha; Jirasak Witeetham; Nithat Yangjui	Paragliding	Men's team accuracy	22 August
Bronze	Suchaya Bualuang	Wushu	Women's sanda 60 kg	23 August
Bronze	Piyapong Arnunamang; Prem Nampratueng; Jaruwat Saensuk	Rowing	Men's double sculls	23 August
Bronze	Atcharaporn Duanglawa	Canoeing	Women's slalom K-1	23 August
Bronze	Hermann Husslein	Canoeing	Men's slalom K-1	23 August
Bronze	Navuti Liphongyu	Cycling	Men's road race	23 August
Bronze	Chatuphum Chinnawong	Weightlifting	Men's 77 kg	23 August
Bronze	Thailand women's national kabaddi team: Alisa Limsamran; Namfon Kangkeeree; Nuntarat Nuntakitkoson; Kamontip Suwanchana; Wassana Rachmanee; Saowapa Chueakhao; Atchara Puangngern; Charinda Yindee; Panthida Khamthat; Kannika Munmai; Bencharat Khwanchai; Naleerat Ketsaro	Kabaddi	Women's tournament	23 August
Bronze	Piyapong Arnunamang; Methasit Phromphoem; Prem Nampratueng; Jaruwat Saensuk	Rowing	Men's quadruple sculls	24 August
Bronze	Matinee Raruen; Phuttharaksa Neegree	Rowing	Women's lightweight double sculls	24 August
Bronze	Rattanawan Wamalun	Weightlifting	Women's 63 kg	24 August
Bronze	Banpot Lertthaisong	Ju-jitsu	Men's 69 kg	24 August
Bronze	Monsicha Tararattanakul	Karate	Women's individual kata	25 August
Bronze	Nuttakorn Pupakdee	Jet ski	Ski modified	25 August
Bronze	Laor Iamluek; Ekkapong Wongunjai; Wasan Upalasueb; Phakdee Wannamanee; Nares Naoprakon; Phawonrat Roddee; Tanawoot Waipinid; Nattawut Kaewsri; Kasemsit Borriboonwasin; Pornchai Tesdee; Vinya Seechomchuen; Boonsong Imtim	Canoeing	Men's TBR-12 200 metres	25 August
Bronze	Sarat Sumpradit	Weightlifting	Men's 94 kg	25 August
Bronze	Kanittha Nennoo; Nipatcha Pootong; Nipaporn Nopsri; Pranchalee Moonkasem; Wararat Plodpai; Wanida Thammarat; Prapaporn Pumkhunthod; Suphatthra Kheha; Patthama Nanthain; Praewpan Kawsri; Nattakant Boonruang; Mintra Mannok; Jariya Kankasikam; Arisara Pantulap; Saowanee Khamsaeng; Jaruwan Chaikan	Canoeing	Women's TBR 500 metres	26 August
Bronze	Suphathat Footrakul	Jet ski	Endurance runabout open	26 August
Bronze	Arinadtha Chavatanont; Preecha Khunjan; Korntawat Samran	Equestrian	Team eventing	26 August
Bronze	Thailand women's national 3x3 team Amphawa Thuamon; Thunchanok Lumbadpang; Warunee Kitraksa; Rujiwan Bunsinprom	3-on-3 basketball	Women's tournament	26 August
Bronze	Adilan Chemaeng	Pencak silat	Men's tanding 60 kg	26 August
Bronze	Tachin Pokjay	Pencak silat	Men's tanding 95 kg	26 August
Bronze	Janejira Wankrue	Pencak silat	Women's tanding 65 kg	26 August
Bronze	Fadil Dama; Masofee Wani; Islamee Wani	Pencak silat	Men's team	27 August
Bronze	Duangaksorn Chaidee	Weightlifting	Women's +75 kg	27 August
Bronze	As Ma Jeh Ma; Yuweeta Samahoh; Ruhana Chearbuli	Pencak silat	Women's team	29 August
Bronze	Kachakorn Warasiha	Judo	Women's 52 kg	29 August
Bronze	Patsapong Amsam-ang	Athletics	Men's pole vault	29 August
Bronze	Navee Thamsoontorn; Nut Butmarasri	Sailing	Men's 470	31 August
Bronze	Siripon Kaewduang-ngam	Sailing	Women's RS:X	31 August
Bronze	Nichpa Waiwai; Kamonchanok Klahan	Sailing	Women's 49erFX	31 August
Bronze	Ikumi Oeda	Judo	Women's 78 kg	31 August
Bronze	Yuttapong Tongdee	Boxing	Men's 52 kg	31 August
Bronze	Rujakran Juntrong	Boxing	Men's 60 kg	31 August
Bronze	Wuttichai Masuk	Boxing	Men's 64 kg	31 August
Bronze	Saylom Ardee	Boxing	Men's 69 kg	31 August
Bronze	Nilawan Techasuep	Boxing	Women's 57 kg	31 August
Bronze	Terasak Jitngamkusol; Taristchollatorn Chodchoy	Contract bridge	Mixed pair	1 September

=== Multiple medallists ===
The following Thailand competitors won several medals at the 2018 Asian Games.

Name	Medal	Sport	Event
Anuwat Chaichana	Gold; Gold	Sepak takraw	Men's team regu Men's team doubles
Assadin Wongyota	Gold; Gold	Sepak takraw	Men's team regu Men's team doubles
Jirasak Pakbuangoen	Gold; Gold	Sepak takraw	Men's team regu Men's team doubles
Pattarapong Yupadee	Gold; Gold	Sepak takraw	Men's team regu Men's team doubles
Pornchai Kaokaew	Gold; Gold	Sepak takraw	Men's team regu Men's team doubles
Nunnapat Phuchong	Gold; Gold	Paragliding	Women's team accuracy Women's individual accuracy
Rachan Viphan	Gold; Gold	Sepak takraw	Men's team regu Men's team doubles
Arinadtha Chavatanont	Bronze; Bronze	Equestrian	Team dressage Team eventing
Jaruwat Saensuk	Bronze; Bronze	Rowing	Men's double sculls Men's quadruple sculls
Piyapong Arnunamang	Bronze; Bronze	Rowing	Men's double sculls Men's quadruple sculls
Prem Nampratueng	Bronze; Bronze	Rowing	Men's double sculls Men's quadruple sculls

== Archery ==
The National Archery Association of Thailand will enter fourteen archers (eight men and six women archers) into the Asian Games tournament.

=== Men's ===
Athlete(s)	Event	Ranking round		Round of 64	Round of 32	Round of 16	Quarterfinals	Semifinals	Final / BM	
Athlete(s)	Event	Score	Seed	Opposition Score	Opposition Score	Opposition Score	Opposition Score	Opposition Score	Opposition Score	Rank
Denchai Thepna	Individual recurve	626	48	did not advance						
Thanapat Pathairat	Individual recurve	637	41 Q	Lee KW (HKG); W 6–4	Furakawa (JPN); L 2–6	did not advance				
Witthaya Thamwong	Individual recurve	630	47 Q	Alwi (KSA); W 6–5	Shana (BAN); L 2–6	did not advance				
Denchai Thepna; Itsarin Thaiuea; Thanapat Pathairat; Witthaya Thamwong	Team recurve	1893	13 Q	—N/a	Bye	China; L 1–5	did not advance			
Chanchai Pratheepwatanawong; Dhansarit Itsarangkun; Khwanchai Phohiran; Nitiphum Chatachot	Team compound	2034	11 Q	—N/a		Kazakhstan; L 222–227	did not advance			

=== Women's ===
Athlete(s)	Event	Ranking round		Round of 64	Round of 32	Round of 16	Quarterfinals	Semifinals	Final / BM	
Athlete(s)	Event	Score	Seed	Opposition Score	Opposition Score	Opposition Score	Opposition Score	Opposition Score	Opposition Score	Rank
Nanthinee Jaehomkrue	Individual recurve	597	49 Q	Kaboksy (LAO); L 5–6	did not advance					
Waraporn Phutdee	Individual recurve	614	40 Q	Dema (BHU); L 4–6	did not advance					
Kanyavee Maneesombatkul; Kodchaporn Pratumsuwan; Nareumon Junsook; Suvaporn Anutaraporn	Team compound	2025	9 Q	—N/a		Vietnam; W 222–210	South Korea; L 226–233	did not advance		

=== Mixed's ===
Athlete(s)	Event	Ranking round		Round of 64	Round of 32	Round of 16	Quarterfinals	Semifinals	Final / BM	
Athlete(s)	Event	Score	Seed	Opposition Score	Opposition Score	Opposition Score	Opposition Score	Opposition Score	Opposition Score	Rank
Thanapat Pathairat; Waraporn Phutdee	Team recurve	1251	15 Q	—N/a	Hong Kong; W 5–3	Chinese Taipei; L 4–5	did not advance			
Dhansarit Itsarangkun; Kanyavee Maneesombatkul	Team compound	1375	9 Q	—N/a	Bye	Indonesia; L 152–153	did not advance			

== Athletics ==
The Athletics Association of Thailand will enter sixty athletes (thirty-three men and twenty-seven women athletes) into the Asian Games tournament.

Key
- Note–Ranks given for track events are within the athlete's heat only
- Q = Qualified for the next round
- q = Qualified for the next round as a fastest loser or, in field events, by position without achieving the qualifying target
- NR = National record
- N/A = Round not applicable for the event
- Bye = Athlete not required to compete in round

=== Men's ===
==== Track & road events ====
Athlete(s)	Event	Heat		Semifinal		Final	
Athlete(s)	Event	Result	Rank	Result	Rank	Result	Rank
Bandit Chuangchai	100 metres	10.57	17 Q	10.57	16	did not advance	
Chayut Khongprasit	100 metres	10.62	20 Q	10.63	20	did not advance	
Sittiphon Donpritee	200 metres	21.52	17	did not advance			
Phitchaya Sunthonthuam	400 metres	49.71	23 Q	48.97	21	did not advance	
Yanakorn Munrot	400 metres	49.06	21 Q	48.96	20	did not advance	
Yothin Yaprajan	800 metres	1:53.71	21	did not advance			
Yothin Yaprajan	1,500 metres	4:01.41	20	did not advance			
Kieran Tuntivate	5,000 metres	—N/a				DNS	
Boonthung Srisung	10,000 metres	—N/a				32:24.72	10
Kieran Tuntivate	10,000 metres	—N/a				30:29.04	4
Apisit Puanglamyai	110 metres hurdles	14.46	15	did not advance			
Pipatporn Puangpi	400 metres hurdles	53.74	19	did not advance			
Sanchai Namkhet	Marathon	—N/a				2:37:06	13
Tony Ah-thit Payne	Marathon	—N/a				2:24:52	8
Bandit Chuangchai; Chayut Khongprasit; Kritsada Namsuwan; Siripol Punpa; Jaran Sathoengram	4 × 100 m relay	39.52	6 Q	—N/a		39.29	6
Apisit Chamsri; Pipatporn Puangpi; Jirayu Pleenaram; Phitchaya Sunthonthuam	4 × 400 m relay	3:08.50	9	did not advance			

==== Field events ====
Athlete	Event	Final	
Athlete	Event	Result	Rank
Saksit Sittichai	High jump	did not advance	
Patsapong Amsam-Ang	Pole vault	5.50	3rd place, bronze medalist(s)
Porranot Poorahong	Pole vault	5.20	10
Supot Boonnun	Long jump	15.97	10
Sutthisak Singkhon	Long jump		
Pratchaya Tepparak	Triple jump	16.43	5
Supot Boonnun	Triple jump		
Promrob Janthima	Shot put	16.22	8
Thawat Kachin	Shot put	15.14	9
Narong Benjaroon	Discus throw	48.27	10
Kittipong Boonmawan	Hammer throw	63.38	10
Peerachet Jantra	Javelin throw	72.85	10

==== Combined events – Decathlon ====
Athlete	Event	100H	LJ	SP	HJ	400 m	110H	DT	PV	JT	1500 m	Final	Rank
Sutthisak Singkhon	Results	10.85	7.54	13.71	2.00	48.49	14.88	44.42	4.20	57.07	4.55.89	7809	2nd place, silver medalist(s)
Sutthisak Singkhon	Points	894	945	711	803	886	864	755	673	694	584	7809	2nd place, silver medalist(s)

=== Women's ===
==== Track & road events ====
Athlete(s)	Event	Heat		Semifinal		Final	
Athlete(s)	Event	Result	Rank	Result	Rank	Result	Rank
On-uma Chattha	100 metres	11.69	10 Q	11.66	9	did not advance	
Rawiwan Pratike	400 metres	1:00.78	16	did not advance			
Supanich Poolkerd	400 metres	56.62	13	did not advance			
Suchada Meesri	100 metres hurdles	14.06	9	did not advance			
Jane Vongvorachoti	Marathon	—N/a				3:03:11	15
Linda Chantachit	Marathon	—N/a				3:08:14	17
Jirawan Chutrakun; On-uma Chattha; Parichat Charoensuk; Sukanda Petraksa; Supawan Thipat; Sureewan Runan	4 × 100 m relay	44.81	4 Q	—N/a		44.56	4
Arisa Weruwanarak; Phimmada Greeso; Rawiwan Pratike; Supanich Poolkerd	4 × 400 m relay	—N/a				3:47.89	7

==== Field events ====
Athlete	Event	Final	
Athlete	Event	Result	Rank
Prangthip Chitkhokkruad	High jump	1.70	11
Wanida Boonwan	High jump	1.75	9
Chayanisa Chomchuendee	Pole vault	4.30	2nd place, silver medalist(s)
Parinya Chuaimaroeng	Long jump	6.26	7
Parinya Chuaimaroeng	Triple jump	13.93	2nd place, silver medalist(s)
Areerat Intadis	Shot put	14.50	8
Charuwan Sroisena	Discus throw	43.87	7
Subenrat Insaeng	Discus throw	57.78	4
Mingkamon Koomphon	Hammer throw	61.18	6
Panwat Gimsrang	Hammer throw	55.59	8
Jariya Wichaidit	Javelin throw	52.36	8
Natta Nachan	Javelin throw	53.32	7

==== Combined events – Heptathlon ====
Athlete	Event	100H	HJ	SP	200 m	LJ	JT	800 m	Final	Rank
Sunisa Khotseemueang	Results	14.70	1.70	12.19	26.49	did not start	did not start	did not start	did not start	did not finish
Sunisa Khotseemueang	Points	882	855	674	755	did not start	did not start	did not start	did not start	did not finish

=== Mixed ===
==== Track & road events ====
Athlete(s)	Event	Final	
Athlete(s)	Event	Result	Rank
Team Thailand; Arisa Weruwanarak; Pipatporn Puangpi; Phitchaya Sunthonthuam; Rawiwan Pratike; Supanich Poolkerd; Thipthanet Sripha	4 × 400 m relay	3.25.80	7

== Badminton ==
The Badminton Association of Thailand will enter twenty badminton players (ten men and ten women badminton players) into the Asian Games tournament.

=== Men's ===
Athlete(s)	Event	Round of 32	Round of 16	Quarterfinal	Semifinal	Final	
Athlete(s)	Event	Opposition Score	Opposition Score	Opposition Score	Opposition Score	Opposition Score	Rank
Kantaphon Wangcharoen	Singles	H. S. Prannoy (IND); W 2–1 (21–12, 15–21, 21–15)	Chou T-c (TPE); L 1–2 (18–21, 21–13, 11–21)	did not advance			
Khosit Phetpradab	Singles	Karunaratne (SRI); W 2–0 (21–12, 21–12)	Christie (INA); L 1–2 (21–17, 18–21, 18–21)	did not advance			
Dechapol Puavaranukroh; Kittinupong Kedren	Doubles	Goh / Tan (MAS); L 0–2 (15–21, 16–21)	did not advance				
Kittisak Namdash; Tinn Isriyanet	Doubles	Kamura / Sonoda (JPN); L 0–2 (11–21, 16–21)	did not advance				
Bodin Isara; Dechapol Puavaranukroh; Kantaphon Wangcharoen; Khosit Phetpradab; Kittinupong Kedren; Kittisak Namdash; Nipitphon Phuangphuapet; Suppanyu Avihingsanon; Tanongsak Saensomboonsuk; Tinn Isriyanet	Team	—N/a	South Korea (KOR); L 1–3	did not advance			

=== Women's ===
Athlete(s)	Event	Round of 32	Round of 16	Quarterfinal	Semifinal	Final	
Athlete(s)	Event	Opposition Score	Opposition Score	Opposition Score	Opposition Score	Opposition Score	Rank
Nitchaon Jindapol	Singles	Pai Y-p (TPE); W 2–0 (21–15, 22–20)	Sirimannage (SRI); W 2–0 (21–4, 21–14)	P. V. Sindhu (IND); L 1–2 (11–21, 21–16, 14–21)	did not advance		
Ratchanok Intanon	Singles	Gurung (NEP); W 2–0 (21–7, 21–4)	Sung J-h (KOR); W 2–0 (21–15, 24–22)	Nehwal (IND); L 0–2 (18–21, 16–21)	did not advance		
Jongkolphan Kititharakul; Rawinda Prajongjai	Doubles	Gurung / Tamang (NEP); W 2–0 (21–7, 21–5)	Chen QC / Jia YF (CHN); L 0–2 (15–21, 17–21)	did not advance			
Chayanit Chaladchalam; Phataimas Muenwong	Doubles	R Panda / AS Sunil (IND); W 2–0 (21–11, 21–6)	Polii / Rahayu (INA); L 0–2 (12–21, 9–21)	did not advance			
Busanan Ongbamrungphan; Chayanit Chaladchalam; Jongkolphan Kititharakul; Nitchaon Jindapol; Phataimas Muenwong; Pornpawee Chochuwong; Puttita Supajirakul; Ratchanok Intanon; Rawinda Prajongjai; Sapsiree Taerattanachai	Team	—N/a	Bye	Chinese Taipei (TPE); W 3–0	China (CHN); L 0–3	Did not advance	3rd place, bronze medalist(s)

=== Mixed's ===
Athlete(s)	Event	Round of 32	Round of 16	Quarterfinal	Semifinal	Final	
Athlete(s)	Event	Opposition Score	Opposition Score	Opposition Score	Opposition Score	Opposition Score	Rank
Nipitphon Phuangphuapet; Puttita Supajirakul	Mixed	Lee Y / Hsu Y-c (TPE); L 0–2 (17–21, 20–22)	did not advance				
Dechapol Puavaranukroh; Sapsiree Taerattanachai	Mixed	Rankireddy / Ponnappa (IND); W 2–0 (27–25, 21–16)	Suwardi / Susanto (INA); W 2–1 (20–22, 21–18, 21–13)	Tang C-m / Tse Y-s (HKG); L 0–2 (13–21, 20–22)	did not advance		

== Baseball ==
The Amateur Baseball Association of Thailand entered Thailand national baseball team into the Asian Games tournament.

Summary

Team	Event	Round 1		Round 2		Super / Consolation		Final / BM	
Team	Event	Oppositions Scores	Rank	Oppositions Scores	Rank	Oppositions Scores	Rank	Opposition Score	Rank
Thailand men's	Men's tournament	Laos: W 15–0 (F/6); Sri Lanka: W 14–3 (F/7)	1 Q	China: L 0–15 (F/6); Pakistan: L 1–8; Japan: L 0–24 (F/5)	4	Hong Kong: L 4–5; Indonesia: L 11–12	4	Did not advance	8

Roster

The following is the Thailand squad in the men's baseball tournament of the 2018 Asian Games. The team consists of 21 players.

Coaches
Chaiyot Sirintharanon
Masatada Ueno

Pos.	No.	Player	Date of birth (age)	Bats	Throws	Club
IF	1	Jitpong Akaradech	4 November 1992 (aged 25)			(Thailand) Suphanburi
C	2	Nirawit Bunnam	29 June 1993 (aged 25)			(Thailand) Bangkok
IF	3	Paramutt Meepakdee	29 August 1986 (aged 31)			(Thailand) Khon Kaen
P	4	Adichat Wongvichit	31 December 1992 (aged 25)			(Thailand) Bangkok
	5	Sanyalak Pipatpinyo	22 July 1992 (aged 26)			(Thailand) Bangkok
OF	6	Joseph Matthew Daru	1 December 1992 (aged 25)			(Thailand) Bangkok
P	7	Suratit Faengsup	7 October 1990 (aged 27)			(Thailand) Khon Kaen
	8	Netithorn Nualla-ong	3 October 1998 (aged 19)			(Thailand) Suphanburi
IF	9	Naruephol Muangkasem	12 April 1997 (aged 21)			(Thailand) Suphanburi
IF	10	Chayaphat Suanthong	15 May 1995 (aged 23)			(Thailand) Bangkok
P	11	Wissaroot Sihamat	9 October 1987 (aged 30)			(Thailand) Khon Kaen
P	12	Siraphop Nadee	15 October 1992 (aged 25)			(Thailand) Suphanburi
IF	15	Phoomwut Wutthikorn	31 October 1993 (aged 24)			(Thailand) Bangkok
C	16	Chanatip Thongbai	28 April 1985 (aged 33)			(Thailand) Suphanburi
P	17	Phanuwat Sukmuang	17 August 1994 (aged 24)			(Thailand) Bangkok
IF	18	Alexander Clark	27 December 1996 (aged 21)			(Thailand) Bangkok
	19	Thanabordee Panyimphakakul	9 November 1993 (aged 24)			(Thailand) Suphanburi
OF	20	Sarawut Jandang	31 July 2000 (aged 18)			(Thailand) Bangkok
P	21	Kevin Kawin Irwin	17 March 2000 (aged 18)			(Thailand) Suphanburi
P	23	Sakai Phraechai	23 May 1997 (aged 21)			(Thailand) Suphanburi
C	33	John Daniel Daru	7 September 1990 (aged 27)			(Thailand) Bangkok

Round 1

Pos	Team	Pld	W	L	RF	RA	PCT	GB	Qualification
1	Thailand	2	2	0	29	3	1.000	—	Preliminary
2	Sri Lanka	2	1	1	18	24	.500	1	
3	Laos	2	0	2	10	30	.000	2	

Source: OCA

21 August; 14:00	Thailand	15–0 (F/6)	Laos	Gelora Bung Karno Baseball Field, Jakarta; Attendance: 200; Umpires: Huang Jun-jeh (TPE)
21 August; 14:00	WP: Phanuwat Sukmuang		LP: Phithak Hopkhop	Gelora Bung Karno Baseball Field, Jakarta; Attendance: 200; Umpires: Huang Jun-jeh (TPE)
21 August; 14:00	HR: Naruephol Muangkasem (1)			Gelora Bung Karno Baseball Field, Jakarta; Attendance: 200; Umpires: Huang Jun-jeh (TPE)

Team	1	2	3	4	5	6	7	8	9	R	H	E
Laos	0	0	0	0	0	0	—	—	—	0	1	5
Thailand	2	4	4	2	2	1	—	—	—	15	13	1

23 August; 14:00	Sri Lanka	3–14 (F/7)	Thailand	Gelora Bung Karno Baseball Field, Jakarta; Attendance: 150; Umpires: Yoshinori Koide (JPN)
23 August; 14:00	LP: Sanjeewa Jayarathne		WP: Kevin Irwin	Gelora Bung Karno Baseball Field, Jakarta; Attendance: 150; Umpires: Yoshinori Koide (JPN)

Team	1	2	3	4	5	6	7	8	9	R	H	E
Thailand	1	6	0	1	0	5	1	—	—	14	21	1
Sri Lanka	0	1	0	1	1	0	0	—	—	3	9	2

Round 2 – Group A

Pos	Team	Pld	W	L	RF	RA	PCT	GB	Qualification
1	Japan	3	3	0	56	2	1.000	—	Super round
2	China	3	2	1	33	20	.667	1	Super round
3	Pakistan	3	1	2	11	32	.333	2	Consolation round
4	Thailand	3	0	3	1	47	.000	3	Consolation round

Source: OCA

26 August; 14:00	China	15–0 (F/6)	Thailand	Rawamangun Baseball Field, Jakarta; Attendance: 150; Umpires: Yang Jae-man (KOR)
26 August; 14:00	WP: Gan Quan	Boxscore	LP: Siraphop Nadee	Rawamangun Baseball Field, Jakarta; Attendance: 150; Umpires: Yang Jae-man (KOR)
26 August; 14:00	HR: Lu Zhenhong (1)	Boxscore		Rawamangun Baseball Field, Jakarta; Attendance: 150; Umpires: Yang Jae-man (KOR)

Team	1	2	3	4	5	6	7	8	9	R	H	E
Thailand	0	0	0	0	0	0	—	—	—	0	1	4
China	0	4	0	5	1	5	—	—	—	15	15	0

27 August; 9:00	Thailand	1–8	Pakistan	Rawamangun Baseball Field, Jakarta; Attendance: 70; Umpires: Cheung Sui Man (HKG)
27 August; 9:00	LP: Kevin Irwin	Boxscore	WP: Muhammad Usman	Rawamangun Baseball Field, Jakarta; Attendance: 70; Umpires: Cheung Sui Man (HKG)
27 August; 9:00	HR: Joe Daru (1)	Boxscore	HR: Arsalan Jamashed (1)	Rawamangun Baseball Field, Jakarta; Attendance: 70; Umpires: Cheung Sui Man (HKG)

Team	1	2	3	4	5	6	7	8	9	R	H	E
Pakistan	3	0	0	0	0	0	0	1	4	8	7	0
Thailand	1	0	0	0	0	0	0	0	0	1	6	5

28 August; 9:00	Thailand	0–24 (F/5)	Japan	Rawamangun Baseball Field, Jakarta; Attendance: 130; Umpires: Sujeewa Wijayanayake (SRI)
28 August; 9:00	LP: Alex Clark	Boxscore	WP: Takumi Takahashi	Rawamangun Baseball Field, Jakarta; Attendance: 130; Umpires: Sujeewa Wijayanayake (SRI)
28 August; 9:00		Boxscore	HR: Tsuyoshi Tamura (2), Yuki Jibiki (1), Michiori Okabe (1), Asahi Sato (1), Kohei Sasagawa (1)	Rawamangun Baseball Field, Jakarta; Attendance: 130; Umpires: Sujeewa Wijayanayake (SRI)

Team	1	2	3	4	5	6	7	8	9	R	H	E
Japan	4	4	5	3	8	—	—	—	—	24	19	1
Thailand	0	0	0	0	0	—	—	—	—	0	0	2

Consolation round

Pos	Team	Pld	W	L	RF	RA	PCT	GB
1	Pakistan	3	3	0	30	5	1.000	—
2	Hong Kong	3	2	1	14	20	.667	1
3	Indonesia	3	1	2	18	28	.333	2
4	Thailand	3	0	3	16	25	.000	3

Source: OCA

30 August; 14:00	Hong Kong	5–4	Thailand	Rawamangun Baseball Field, Jakarta; Attendance: 100; Umpires: Sandy Kusuma (INA)
30 August; 14:00	WP: Sam Leung	Boxscore	LP: Siraphop Nadee	Rawamangun Baseball Field, Jakarta; Attendance: 100; Umpires: Sandy Kusuma (INA)
30 August; 14:00	HR: Benny Tam (1)	Boxscore	HR: Joe Daru (1)	Rawamangun Baseball Field, Jakarta; Attendance: 100; Umpires: Sandy Kusuma (INA)

Team	1	2	3	4	5	6	7	8	9	R	H	E
Thailand	0	2	0	0	2	0	0	0	0	4	8	3
Hong Kong	0	0	0	0	3	1	0	0	1	5	10	1

31 August; 14:00	Indonesia	12–11	Thailand	Rawamangun Baseball Field, Jakarta; Attendance: 100; Umpires: Chu Hsu-kuang (TPE)
31 August; 14:00	WP: Andika Arlistianto; Sv: Chindy Patria Yudharana	Boxscore	LP: Kevin Irwin	Rawamangun Baseball Field, Jakarta; Attendance: 100; Umpires: Chu Hsu-kuang (TPE)
31 August; 14:00	HR: Hakeem Yatim (1)	Boxscore	HR: Suratit Faengsup (1)	Rawamangun Baseball Field, Jakarta; Attendance: 100; Umpires: Chu Hsu-kuang (TPE)

Team	1	2	3	4	5	6	7	8	9	R	H	E
Thailand	0	0	0	0	3	2	2	4	0	11	12	5
Indonesia	3	1	7	0	0	1	0	0	X	12	15	2

== Basketball ==
Summary

Team	Event	Group Stage					Quarterfinal	Semifinals / Pl.	Final / BM / Pl.	
Team	Event	Opposition Score	Opposition Score	Opposition Score	Opposition Score	Rank	Opposition Score	Opposition Score	Opposition Score	Rank
Thailand men's	Men's tournament	—N/a	Mongolia; W 87−86	Indonesia; L 86−98	South Korea; L 77−117	4	did not advance			
Thailand women's	Women's tournament	China; L 42−110	Hong Kong; W 86−76	Japan; L 41−91	Mongolia; W 62−39	3 Q	Korea; L 63−106	Mongolia; W 80−51	Kazakhstan; L 64−71	6
Thailand men's	Men's 3x3 tournament	Sri Lanka; W 20−10	Indonesia; W 17−15	Vietnam; W 21−7	China; L 16−21	2 Q	Japan; W 21−13	South Korea; L 16−20	Iran; L 7−21	4
Thailand women's	Women's 3x3 tournament	—N/a	Iran; W 11−7	Maldives; DSQ	Kazakhstan; W 21−6	1 Q	Malaysia; W 15−13	Japan; L 16−21	Chinese Taipei; W 15−14	3rd place, bronze medalist(s)

=== 5x5 basketball ===
The Basketball Sport Association of Thailand will enter Thailand men's and women's national basketball team.

==== Men's tournament ====
Roster

The following is the Thailand roster in the men's basketball tournament of the 2018 Asian Games.

Thailand men's national basketball team - 2018 Asian Games roster
Players
Coaches

Pos.	No.	Name	Age – Date of birth	Height	Club	Ctr.
F	4	Eaktanat To Ngiw	21 – 12 January 1997	1.83 m (6 ft 0 in)	PEA	(Thailand)
PG	6	Sorot Sunthonsiri	25 – 11 February 1993	1.81 m (5 ft 11 in)	Mono Vampire	(Thailand)
PG	7	Suppawich Khukhandhin	23 – 10 November 1994	1.77 m (5 ft 10 in)	Mono Vampire	(Thailand)
SF	8	Nakorn Jaisanuk	26 – 18 November 1991	1.90 m (6 ft 3 in)	Hi-Tech	(Thailand)
SF	10	Sirapong Boonyai	29 – 12 January 1989	1.84 m (6 ft 0 in)	Mono Vampire	(Thailand)
PG	12	Bandit Lakhan	27 – 21 March 1991	1.80 m (5 ft 11 in)	TGE	(Thailand)
SF	20	Tawatchai Suktub	30 – 5 October 1987	1.86 m (6 ft 1 in)	Black Scorpions	(Thailand)
C	25	Anasawee Klaewnarong	24 – 22 November 1993	1.99 m (6 ft 6 in)	Hi-Tech	(Thailand)
C	36	Patiphan Klahan	24 – 31 December 1993	2.00 m (6 ft 7 in)	Hi-Tech	(Thailand)
PF	38	Arnat Phuangla	22 – 16 July 1996	1.93 m (6 ft 4 in)	Mono Vampire	(Thailand)
G	47	Attapong Leelaphipatkul	22 – 16 July 1996	1.93 m (6 ft 4 in)	TGE	(Thailand)
F	77	Chitchai Ananti	28 – 26 June 1990	1.88 m (6 ft 2 in)	Mono Vampire	(Thailand)

Head coach

- (United States) Douglas Marty

Legend

- (C) Team captain
- (NP) Naturalized player
- Club - describes last
  club before the tournament
- Age - describes age
  on 14 August 2018

Group play

Pos	Team	Pld	W	L	PF	PA	PD	Pts	Qualification
1	South Korea	3	3	0	329	215	+114	6	Quarterfinals
2	Indonesia	3	1	2	232	264	−32	4 (Note: Tied on head-to-head wins (1). Head-to-head game points difference: INA +7, MGL +4, THA −11.)	Quarterfinals
3	Mongolia	3	1	2	233	264	−31	4	
4	Thailand	3	1	2	250	301	−51	4	

Source: OCA
Notes:

14 August
12:30

Thailand	87–86	Mongolia
Scoring by quarter: 26–14, 19–29, 23–19, 19–24
Pts: Klahan 18; Rebs: Klaewnarong, Klahan 10; Asts: Lakhan, Ananti 7		Pts: Sanchir 25; Rebs: Sanchir 13; Asts: Sergelen 6

Gelora Bung Karno Basketball Hall, Jakarta
Referees: Mohammad Doust (IRI), Kumiko Kumagai (JPN), Chen Ying-cheng (TPE)

20 August
18:30

Indonesia	98–86	Thailand
Scoring by quarter: 30–29, 21–14, 21–23, 26–20
Pts: Johnson 28; Rebs: Johnson 16; Asts: Grahita, Prastawa 3		Pts: Jaisanuk 28; Rebs: Ananti 7 Asts: Lakhan 5

Gelora Bung Karno Basketball Hall, Jakarta
Referees: Yuen Chun Yip (HKG), Mohammad Doust (IRI), Kumiko Kumagai (JPN)

22 August
18:30

South Korea	117–77	Thailand
Scoring by quarter: 26–16, 36–20, 29–18, 26–23
Pts: Ra 21; Rebs: Kang, Lee S. 8 Asts: Park 7		Pts: Suktub 17; Rebs: Klahan, Ananti 6 Asts: Leelaphipatkul 6

Gelora Bung Karno Basketball Hall, Jakarta
Referees: Mohammad Doust (IRI), Chen Ying-cheng (TPE), Anan Daraghma (PLE)

==== Women's tournament ====
Roster

The following is the Thailand roster in the women's basketball tournament of the 2018 Asian Games.

Thailand women's national basketball team - 2018 Asian Games roster
Players
Coaches

Pos.	No.	Name	Age – Date of birth	Height	Club	Ctr.
F	6	Penphan Yothanan (C)	35 – 29 December 1982	1.69 m (5 ft 7 in)	Chulalongkorn University	(Thailand)
G	7	Pimchosita Supyen	21 – 4 July 1997	1.60 m (5 ft 3 in)	Shoot It Dragon	(Thailand)
G/F	8	Supavadee Kunchuan	25 – 4 December 1992	1.78 m (5 ft 10 in)	Kru Somsri	(Thailand)
F	9	Wipaporn Saechua	31 – 3 April 1987	1.70 m (5 ft 7 in)	Shoot It Dragon	(Thailand)
G	11	Suree Phromrat	27 – 17 July 1991	1.62 m (5 ft 4 in)	Kru Somsri	(Thailand)
C	13	Atchara Kaichaiyapoom	26 – 11 February 1992	1.78 m (5 ft 10 in)	Sripatum University	(Thailand)
G	14	Pornnutcha Sawatong	25 – 20 April 1993	1.65 m (5 ft 5 in)	Chulalongkorn University	(Thailand)
C	18	Yanee Phosut	20 – 29 August 1997	1.72 m (5 ft 8 in)	Sripatum University	(Thailand)
C	38	Kloyjai Phetsaenkha	23 – 27 March 1995	1.81 m (5 ft 11 in)	Shoot It Dragon	(Thailand)
F	88	Supira Klanbut	24 – 8 July 1994	1.77 m (5 ft 10 in)	Shoot It Dragon	(Thailand)
F	91	Thidaporn Maihom	25 – 9 April 1993	1.70 m (5 ft 7 in)	Sripatum University	(Thailand)
C	93	Kanokwan Prajuapsook	20 – 19 January 1998	1.78 m (5 ft 10 in)	Sripatum University	(Thailand)

Head coach

- (United States) Christopher Daleo

Assistant coach(es)

- (Thailand) Kanchana Prasanchaimontree

Legend

- (C) Team captain
- (NP) Naturalized player
- Club - describes last
  club before the tournament
- Age - describes age
  on 15 August 2018

Group play

Pos	Team	Pld	W	L	PF	PA	PD	Pts	Qualification
1	China	4	4	0	448	182	+266	8	Quarterfinals
2	Japan	4	3	1	392	225	+167	7	Quarterfinals
3	Thailand	4	2	2	231	316	−85	6	Quarterfinals
4	Mongolia	4	1	3	193	358	−165	5	Quarterfinals
5	Hong Kong	4	0	4	230	413	−183	4	

Source: OCA

15 August
10:00

China	110–42	Thailand
Scoring by quarter: 30–7, 23–12, 30–14, 27–9
Pts: Sun 16; Rebs: Sun 10; Asts: Li Yua. 7		Pts: Prajuapsook 11; Rebs: Prajuapsook 4 Asts: Phromrat 3

Gelora Bung Karno Basketball Hall, Jakarta
Referees: Snehal Bendke (IND), Alexey Stepanenko (KAZ), Budi Marfan (INA)

19 August
16:00

Thailand	86–76	Hong Kong
Scoring by quarter: 18–16, 23–15, 19–28, 26–17
Pts: Maihom 24; Rebs: Maihom 10; Asts: Saechua, Phromrat 5		Pts: Wong K.M. 23; Rebs: Wong P. 13; Asts: Wong Y., Li 4

Gelora Bung Karno Basketball Hall, Jakarta
Referees: Snehal Bendke (IND), Hadi Salem (IRI), Budi Marfan (INA)

21 August
12:30

Thailand	41–91	Japan
Scoring by quarter: 10–28, 13–22, 16–20, 2–21
Pts: Maihom 12; Rebs: Kunchuan 6 Asts: Saechua, Klanbut 3		Pts: Watanabe 27; Rebs: Umezawa 8 Asts: Yasuma 11

Gelora Bung Karno Basketball Hall, Jakarta
Referees: Snehal Bendke (IND), Chen Ying-cheng (TPE), Budi Marfan (INA)

23 August
12:30

Mongolia	39–62	Thailand
Scoring by quarter: 6–10, 12–13, 12–21, 9–18
Pts: Bulbul 11; Rebs: Altanzayaa 13; Asts: Bayanjargal 4		Pts: Klanbut, Maihom 11; Rebs: Kunchuan 10; Asts: Kunchuan, Saechua 4

Gelora Bung Karno Basketball Hall, Jakarta
Referees: Yevgeniy Mikheyev (KAZ), Lee Ji-youn (KOR), Haryanto Sutaryo (INA)

Quarter-finals

26 August
12:30

Korea	106–63	Thailand
Scoring by quarter: 28–11, 32–8, 16–18, 30–26
Pts: Kang 20; Rebs: Choi 11; Asts: Park J.H. 8		Pts: Maihom 12; Rebs: Klanbut, Prajuapsook 6 Asts: four players 3

Gelora Bung Karno Basketball Hall, Jakarta
Referees: Hadi Salem (IRI), Budi Marfan (INA), Cui Zhexiong (CHN)

5–8th place semifinals

31 August
16:00

Thailand	64–71	Kazakhstan
Scoring by quarter: 15–17, 13–14, 23–18, 13–22
Pts: Prajuapsook 19; Rebs: Maihom 6 Asts: Saechua 5		Pts: Kondrakova 17; Rebs: Ivanova 9 Asts: Kurazova 7

Istora Gelora Bung Karno, Jakarta
Referees: Snehal Bendke (IND), Kumiko Kumagai (JPN), Budi Marfan (INA)

=== 3x3 basketball ===
Thailand national 3x3 team will participate in the Games. The men's team placed in pool A, and the women's team in pool C based on the FIBA 3x3 federation ranking.

==== Men's tournament ====
Roster

The following is the Thailand roster in the men's 3x3 basketball tournament of the 2018 Asian Games.

- Chatpol Chungyampin
- Chanatip Jakrawan
- Guntapong Korsah Dick
- Nithipol Sawathavorn

Group play

Pos	Team	Pld	W	L	PF	PA	PD	Qualification
1	China	4	4	0	86	49	+37	Quarterfinals
2	Thailand	4	3	1	74	53	+21	Quarterfinals
3	Indonesia	4	2	2	67	59	+8	
4	Sri Lanka	4	1	3	57	66	−9	
5	Vietnam	4	0	4	28	85	−57	

Source: OCA

21 August
16:00

Thailand	20–10	Sri Lanka
Pts: Jakrawan, Chungyampin 8		Pts: Brent 4

Gelora Bung Karno Tennis Center Court, Jakarta
Referees: Tan (SGP), Ito (JPN)

21 August
18:20

Indonesia	15–17	Thailand
Pts: Pangesthio 5		Pts: Jakrawan 7

Gelora Bung Karno Tennis Center Court, Jakarta
Referees: Ho (HKG), Ibragimow (TKM)

24 August
17:10

Thailand	21–7	Vietnam
Pts: Korsah-dick 12		Pts: Triệu 3

Gelora Bung Karno Tennis Center Court, Jakarta
Referees: Lim (MAS), Liu (MAS)

24 August
19:40

China	21–16	Thailand
Pts: Zeng 6		Pts: Sawathavorn 7

Gelora Bung Karno Tennis Center Court, Jakarta
Referees: Ito (JPN), Ibragimow (TKM)

Quarter-finals

26 August
16:30

Japan	13–21	Thailand
Pts: Matsuwaki 10		Pts: Korsah-dick 10

Gelora Bung Karno Tennis Center Court, Jakarta
Referees: Ho (HKG), Quinn (INA)

Semifinals

26 August
18:30

South Korea	20–16	Thailand
Pts: An 8		Pts: Korsah-dick 9

Gelora Bung Karno Tennis Center Court, Jakarta
Referees: Ho (HKG), Ibragimow (TKM)

Bronze medal game

26 August
19:45

Iran	21–7	Thailand
Pts: Allahverdi, Yousefvand 8		Pts: Korsah-dick 4

Gelora Bung Karno Tennis Center Court, Jakarta
Referees: Liu (MAS), Shi (CHN)

==== Women's tournament ====
Roster

The following is the Thailand roster in the women's 3x3 basketball tournament of the 2018 Asian Games.

Group play

Pos	Team	Pld	W	L	PF	PA	PD	Qualification
1	Thailand	3	3	0	32	13	+19	Quarterfinals
2	Iran	3	2	1	25	23	+2	Quarterfinals
3	Kazakhstan	3	1	2	18	39	−21	
—	Maldives	3	0	3	0	0	0	

Source: OCA

21 August
19:00

Iran	7–11	Thailand
Pts: Yazdian 3		Pts: Bunsinprom 5

Gelora Bung Karno Tennis Center Court, Jakarta
Referees: Shi (CHN), Lim (MAS)

24 August
15:40

Maldives	vs.	Thailand
Forfeit

Gelora Bung Karno Tennis Center Court, Jakarta

24 August
16:20

Kazakhstan	6–21	Thailand
Pts: Petelina, Arzamastseva, Zukova 2		Pts: Bunsinprom 7

Gelora Bung Karno Tennis Center Court, Jakarta
Referees: Shi (CHN), Lim (MAS)

Quarter-finals

26 August
15:50

Thailand	15–13	Malaysia
Pts: Bunsinprom 7		Pts: Wong 5

Gelora Bung Karno Tennis Center Court, Jakarta
Referees: Al-Harthi (OMA), Ito (JPN)

Semifinals

26 August
17:30

Japan	21–16	Thailand
Pts: Mawuli 8		Pts: Bunsinprom 8

Gelora Bung Karno Tennis Center Court, Jakarta
Referees: Shi (CHN), Al-Harthi (OMA)

Bronze medal game

26 August
19:15

Chinese Taipei	14–15 (OT)	Thailand
Pts: Lo 10		Pts: Bunsinprom 6

Gelora Bung Karno Tennis Center Court, Jakarta

== Bowling ==
The Thai Tenpin Bowling Association will enter twelve bowlers (six men and six women bowlers) into the Asian Games tournament.

=== Men's ===
==== Trios and Team of 6 ====
Athlete(s)	Event	Block 1		Block 2		Total	Final rank
Athlete(s)	Event	Score	Rank	Score	Rank	Total	Final rank
Annop Arromsaranon; Surasak Manuwong; Yannaphon Larpapharat	Trios	1991	20	3971	18	3971	18
Erik Kim Bolleby; Atchariya Cheng; Sithiphol Kunaksorn	Trios	2063	12	4067	13	4067	13
Team Thailand; Annop Arromsaranon; Atchariya Cheng; Erik Kim Bolleby; Sithiphol Kunaksorn; Surasak Manuwong; Yannaphon Larpapharat	Team of 6	4057	7	8072	6	8072	6

=== Women's ===
==== Trios and Team of 6 ====
Athlete(s)	Event	Block 1		Block 2		Total	Final rank
Athlete(s)	Event	Score	Rank	Score	Rank	Total	Final rank
Kantaporn Singhabubbpha; Natthida Sertleucha; Yanee Saebe	Trios	1924	11	3746	17	3746	17
Kalyawat Pongnekkul; Thanchanok Vilailak; Thitima Thongsaard	Trios	1727	20	3343	21	3343	21
Team Thailand; Kalyawat Pongnekkul; Kantaporn Singhabubbpha; Natthida Sertleucha; Thanchanok Vilailak; Thitima Thongsaard; Yanee Saebe	Team of 6	3508	9	7384	9	7384	9

== Boxing ==
The Thailand Boxing Association will enter ten boxers (seven men and three women boxers) into the Asian Games tournament.

=== Men's ===
Athlete	Event	Round of 32	Round of 16	Quarterfinals	Semifinals	Final	
Athlete	Event	Opposition Result	Opposition Result	Opposition Result	Opposition Result	Opposition Result	Rank
Wuttichai Yurachai	Light flyweight	Muhamad Fuad Mohd Redzuan (MAS); W 5–0	Wu Zhonglin (CHN); L 0–5	did not advance			
Yuthapong Thongdee	Flyweight	Bye	Meethalawe Vidanalage Ishan Ra Bandara (SRI); TKO	Gankhuyagiin Gan-Erdene (MGL); W 3–2	Rogen Ladon (PHI); L 0–5	3rd place, bronze medalist(s)	
Chatchai Butdee	Bantamweight	Elisio Raimundo Gaio (TLS); W 5–0	Kairat Yeraliyev (KAZ); W 5–0	Jo Hyo-nam (PRK); L 0–5	did not advance		
Rutchakarn Chantrong	Lightweight	Sadiq Abdullatef (QAT); WO	Ramon Monteiro Savon (TLS); W 5–0	Farrand Papendang (INA); W 5–0	Shunkor Abdurasulov (UZB); L 0–5	3rd place, bronze medalist(s)	
Wuttichai Masuk	Light welterweight	Bye	Bakhodur Usmonov (TJK); W 4–1	Bekdaulet Ibragimov (KAZ); W 5–0	Chinzorig Baatarsukh (MGL); L 2–3	3rd place, bronze medalist(s)	
Sailom Adi	Welterweight	Bye	Timur Tajimov (TKM); W 5–0	Sajjad Kazemzadeh Poshtiri (IRI); W 5–0	Bobo Usmon Baturov (UZB); L 1–4	3rd place, bronze medalist(s)	
Aphisit Kanankhokkhruea	Middleweight	Yuito Moriwaki (JPN); W 3–2	Abilkhan Amankul (KAZ); L 0–5	did not advance			

=== Women's ===
Athlete	Event	Round of 16	Quarterfinals	Semifinals	Final	
Athlete	Event	Opposition Result	Opposition Result	Opposition Result	Opposition Result	Rank
Jutamas Raksat	Flyweight	Pang Chol-mi (PRK); L 1–4	did not advance			
Nilawan Techaseup	Bantamweight	Sangita Sunar (NEP); W 5–0	Saniya Sultankyzy (KAZ); W 3–2	Yin Junhua (CHN); L 0–5	3rd place, bronze medalist(s)	
Sudaporn Seesondee	Lightweight	Wu Shih-yi (TPE); W 4–1	Rimma Volossenko (KAZ); W 4–1	Huswatun Hasanah (INA); W 5–0	Yeon Jin-oh (KOR); L 1–4	2nd place, silver medalist(s)

== Bridge ==
The Contract Bridge League of Thailand will enter twenty-four contract bridge players (fourteen men and eight women contract bridge players) into the Asian Games tournament.

Men

Athlete	Event	Qualification		Semifinal		Final	
Athlete	Event	Point	Rank	Point	Rank	Point	Rank
Singsan Phromyothi; Wanchai Danwachira	Pair	1533.9	11 Q	952.7	20	did not advance	
Kasemsuk Koomtako; Chongchana Chantamas	Pair	1455.9	18 Q	1037.8	14	did not advance	
Vithaya Viriyamontchai; Kirawat Limsinsopon	Pair	1391.4	26	did not advance			
Chongchana Chantamas; Kasemsuk Koomtakoo; Singsan Phromyothi; Wanchai Danwachira; Vithaya Viriyamontchai; Kirawat Limsinsopon	Team	113.45	9	did not advance			

Women

Athlete	Event	Qualification		Semifinal		Final	
Athlete	Event	Point	Rank	Point	Rank	Point	Rank
Pobsook Kamolvej; Ann Malakul	Pair	850.7	13 Q	746.1	10 Q	322	10
Vallapa Svangsopakul; Pavinee Sitthicharoensawat	Pair	745.1	19	did not advance			

Mixed

Athlete	Event	Qualification		Semifinal		Final	
Athlete	Event	Point	Rank	Point	Rank	Point	Rank
Terasak Jitngamkusol; Taristchollatorn Chodchoy	Pair	1287	7 Q	733.9	6 Q	342	3rd place, bronze medalist(s)
Kridsadayut Plengsap; Kanokporn Janebunjong	Pair	1189.7	15 Q	705	13	did not advance	
Peeracha Suriya; Jittakan Pachimsawat	Pair	1185.1	16 Q	660	15	did not advance	
Taristchollatorn Chodchoy; Chodchoy Sophonpanich; Kanokporn Janebunjong; Terasak Jitngamkusol; Somchai Baisamut; Kridsadayut Plengsap	Team	142.08	4 Q	India (IND); W 113–109.67		China (CHN); L 70–122.67	2nd place, silver medalist(s)
Vallapa Svangsopakul; Pavinee Sitthicharoensawat; Pobsook Kamolvej; Jaturong Sasibut; Pornthep Leelasa Nguan; Asdang Riamsree	Supermixed team	81.62	7	did not advance			

== Canoeing ==
The Rowing & Canoeing Association of Thailand will enter fifty-four canoeists and rowers. (27 men and 27 women canoeists and rowers) into the Asian Games tournament.

=== Slalom ===
Athlete	Event	Heat		Semifinal		Final	
Athlete	Event	Score	Rank	Score	Rank	Score	Rank
Yutthakan Chaidet	Men's C-1	92.15	7 Q	100.23	7 Q	99.86	5
Chonlasit Phuttraksa	Men's C-1	107.63	12 Q	105.35	10	did not advance	
Hermann Husslein	Men's K-1	83.23	4 Q	94.75	6 Q	90.40	3rd place, bronze medalist(s)
Paitas Ngamsanga	Men's K-1	93.97	9 Q	105.86	10	did not advance	
Atcharaporn Duanglawa	Women's C-1	119.31	5 Q	124.71	4 Q	116.34	3rd place, bronze medalist(s)
Worada Chonsuk	Women's C-1	141.22	8 Q	339.83	10	did not advance	
Jaruwan Niamthong	Women's K-1	120.55	9 Q	151.43	9	did not advance	
Thatchaporn Pornchai	Women's K-1	124.31	10 Q	143.85	8 Q	125.25	5

=== Sprint ===
Athlete	Event	Heat		Semifinal		Final	
Athlete	Event	Score	Rank	Score	Rank	Score	Rank
	Men's C-1 1000 metres						
	Men's C-2 200 metres						
	Men's C-2 1000 metres						
	Men's K-1 200 metres						
	Men's K-2 1000 metres						
	Men's K-4 500 metres						
	Women's C-1 200 metres						
	Women's C-2 500 metres						
	Women's K-1 200 metres						
	Women's K-1 500 metres						
	Women's K-2 500 metres						
	Women's K-4 500 metres						

=== Traditional boat race ===
Athlete	Event	Heat		Repechage		Semifinal		Final	
Athlete	Event	Score	Rank	Score	Rank	Score	Rank	Score	Rank
Laor Iamluek; Ekkapong Wongunjai; Wasan Upalasueb; Phakdee Wannamanee; Nares Naoprakon; Phawonrat Roddee; Tanawoot Waipinid; Nattawut Kaewsri; Kasemsit Borriboonwasin; Pornchai Tesdee; Vinya Seechomchuen; Boonsong Imtim	Men's TBR-12 200 metres	52.004	4 SF	—N/a		52.582	4 Q	52.622	3rd place, bronze medalist(s)
	Men's TBR-12 500 metres								
	Men's TBR-12 1000 metres								
Wararat Plodpai; Wanida Thammarat; Prapaporn Pumkhunthod; Suphatthra Kheha; Patthama Nanthain; Praewpan Kawsri; Nattakant Boonruang; Mintra Mannok; Pranchalee Moonkasem; Nipaporn Nopsri; Nipatcha Pootong; Kanittha Nennoo	Women's TBR-12 200 metres	57.987	4 SF	—N/a		57.405	4 Q	57.571	4
	Women's TBR-12 500 metres								

=== Sprint ===
==== Men's ====
- Kasemsit Borriboonwasin
- Praison Buasamrong
- Chanrit Chakkhian
- Wattana Chitphantulap
- Phanuphong Jiranarongchai
- Nattawut Kaewsri
- Nares Naoprakon
- Yutthana Porananon
- Thiraphong Ratkhamhaeng
- Thoedsak Sonthi
- Aditep Srichart

==== Women's ====
- Thanyaluk Aoenthachai
- Kunyatad Boonma
- Kanittha Nennoo
- Kantida Nurun
- Jirawan Phaophandee
- Wararat Plodpai
- Jitsupa Prakobtam
- Orasa Thiangkathok
- Porncharus Yamprasert

=== Traditional boat race ===
==== Men's ====
- Chaiyakarn Choochuen
- Laor Iamluek
- Boonsong Imtim
- Santas Mingwongyang
- Asdawut Mitilee
- Phawonrat Roddee
- Vinya Seechomchuen
- Pornchai Tesdee
- Wasan Upalasueb
- Natthawat Waenphrom
- Tanawoot Waipinid
- Pakdee Wannamanee
- Ekkapong Wongunjai

==== Women's ====
- Nattakan Boonruang
- Jaruwan Chaikan
- Jariya Kankasikam
- Praewpan Kawsri
- Saowanee Khamsaeng
- Suphatthra Kheha
- Mintra Mannok
- Pranchalee Moonkasem
- Patthama Nanthain
- Nipaporn Nopsri
- Arisara Pantulap
- Nipatcha Pootong
- Prapaporn Pumkhunthod
- Wanida Thammarat

== Cycling ==
The Thai Cycling Association will enter thirty-seven cyclists. (23 men and 14 women cyclists) into the Asian Games tournament.

=== BMX ===
Athlete	Event	Seeding		Final	
Athlete	Event	Result	Rank	Result	Rank
Nonthakon Inkhokshong	Men's BMX	37.360	9	did not advance	
Sitthichok Kaewsrikhao	Men's BMX	35.630	2	40.094	7
Chamavee Kerdmanee	Women's BMX	42.690	7	42.471	4
Chutikan Kitwanitsathian	Women's BMX	41.410	5	40.379	2
Waranya Saetae	Women's BMX				

=== Mountain biking ===
Athlete	Event	Final	
Athlete	Event	Time	Rank
Keerati Sukprasart	Men's cross-country	1:44:07	11
Pariwat Tanlek	Men's cross-country	1:41:25	7
Chinnapat Sukchanya	Men's downhill	2:20.404	4
Suebsakun Sukchanya	Men's downhill	2:18.449	3rd place, bronze medalist(s)
Natalie Panyawan	Women's cross-country	1:26:11	3rd place, bronze medalist(s)
Siriluck Warapiang	Women's cross-country	1:34:22	6
Siraphatson Chatkamnoed	Women's downhill	2:44.785	4
Vipavee Deekaballes	Women's downhill	2:42.654	2nd place, silver medalist(s)

=== Road ===
==== Men's ====
- Turakit Boonratanathanakorn
- Thanakhan Chaiyasombat
- Peerapol Chawchiangkwang
- Navuti Liphongyu
- Sarawut Sirironnachai

==== Women's ====
- Chaniporn Batriya
- Phetdarin Somrat

=== Track ===
==== Men's ====
- Jai Angsuthasawit
- Turakit Boonratanathanakorn
- Kapunya Worayut
- Navuti Liphongyu
- Yuttana Mano
- Jaturong Niwanti
- Warut Paekrathok
- Patompob Phonarjthan
- Phuchong Saiudomsin
- Satjakul Sianglam
- Sarawut Sirironnachai
- Pongthep Tapimay

==== Women's ====
- Watinee Luekajorn
- Jutatip Maneephan
- Chanpeng Nontasin
- Supaksorn Nuntana
- Pannaray Rasee

== Diving ==
The Thailand Swimming Association entered four divers into the Asian Games tournament.

Men

Athlete	Event	Preliminaries		Final	
Athlete	Event	Points	Rank	Points	Rank
Chawanwat Juntaphadawon	3 m springboard	344.05	11 Q	328.00	11
Conrad Lewandowski	10 m platform	323.55	10 Q	324.50	10
Chawanwat Juntaphadawon; Theerapat Siriboon	3 m synchronized springboard	—N/a		275.49	8
Conrad Lewandowski; Thitipoom Marksin	10 m synchronized platform	—N/a		291.84	7

== Equestrian ==
The Thailand Equestrian Federation will enter eleven equestrians (5 men and 6 women equestrians) into the Asian Games tournament.

=== Dressage ===
Athlete(s)	Horse(s)	Event	Grand Prix		Grand Prix Special		Grand Prix Freestyle		Overall	
Athlete(s)	Horse(s)	Event	Score	Rank	Score	Rank	Technical	Artistic	Score	Rank
Apisada Bannagijsophon		Individual								
Arinadtha Chavatanont		Individual								
Chalermcharn Yotviriyapanit		Individual								
Pakjira Thongpakdi		Individual								
Team Thailand; Apisada Bannagijsophon; Arinadtha Chavatanont; Chalermcharn Yotviriyapanit; Pakjira Thongpakdi		Team								

=== Eventing ===
Athlete(s)	Horse(s)	Event	Dressage		Cross-country			Jumping			Total	
Athlete(s)	Horse(s)	Event	Penalties	Rank	Penalties	Total	Rank	Penalties	Total	Rank	Penalties	Rank
Arinadtha Chavatanont		Individual										
Fuangvich Aniruth-Deva		Individual										
Korntawat Samran		Individual										
Preecha Khunjan		Individual										
Team Thailand; Arinadtha Chavatanont; Fuangvich Aniruth-Deva; Korntawat Samran; Preecha Khunjan		Team										

=== Jumping ===
Athlete	Horse	Event	Qualification					Final					Total	
Athlete	Horse	Event	Round 1		Round 2			Round A		Round B			Total	
Athlete	Horse	Event	Penalties	Rank	Penalties	Total	Rank	Penalties	Rank	Penalties	Total	Rank	Penalties	Rank
Alexander Tai Du Vernet Davis		Individual												
Jaruporn Limpichati		Individual												
Sailub Lertratanachai		Individual												
Siengsaw Lertratanachai		Individual												
Team Thailand; Alexander Tai Du Vernet Davis; Jaruporn Limpichati; Sailub Lertratanachai; Siengsaw Lertratanachai		Team												

== Esports (demonstration) ==
Arena of Valor

Athlete	ID	Event	Round 1	Round 2	Round 3	Loser round 1	Loser round 2	Loser round 3	Semifinal	Final	
Athlete	ID	Event	Opposition Score	Opposition Score	Opposition Score	Opposition Score	Opposition Score	Opposition Score	Opposition Score	Opposition Score	Rank
	Snow; BEST; MrSunz; Hamz; Lorie	Arena of Valor	China; L 0–2	did not advance		Indonesia; W 2–1	Chinese Taipei; L 1–2	did not advance			

Hearthstone and StarCraft II

Athlete	ID	Event	Quarterfinals	Semifinals	Final / BM	
Athlete	ID	Event	Opposition Score	Opposition Score	Opposition Score	Rank
Werit Popan	Disdai	Hearthstone	Indonesia; L 1–3	did not advance		
Pichayut Prasertwit	StriKE	StarCraft II	South Korea; L 0–3	did not advance		

== Fencing ==
The Amateur Fencing Association of Thailand will enter eighteen fencers. (ten men and eight women fencers) into the Asian Games tournament.

=== Men's ===
Athlete	Event	Round of 64	Round of 32	Round of 16	Quarterfinal	Semifinal	Final / BM	
Athlete	Event	Opposition Score	Opposition Score	Opposition Score	Opposition Score	Opposition Score	Opposition Score	Rank
Chinnaphat Chaloemchanen	Individual épée							
Korakote Juengamnuaychai	Individual épée							
Thanwa Chantharapidok	Individual épée							
Chornnasun Mayakarn	Individual foil							
Ratchanavi Deejing	Individual foil							
Sitsadipat Doungpatra	Individual foil							
Kanisorn Pangmoon	Individual sabre							
Ruangrit Haekerd	Individual sabre							
Soravit Kitsiriboon	Individual sabre							
Voragun Srinualnad	Individual sabre							
Team Thailand; Kanisorn Pangmoon; Ruangrit Haekerd; Soravit Kitsiriboon; Voragun Srinualnad	Team sabre							

=== Women's ===
Athlete	Event	Round of 64	Round of 32	Round of 16	Quarterfinal	Semifinal	Final / BM	
Athlete	Event	Opposition Score	Opposition Score	Opposition Score	Opposition Score	Opposition Score	Opposition Score	Rank
Korawan Thanee	Individual épée							
Wijitta Takhamwong	Individual épée							
Karanikar Siribrahmanakul	Individual foil							
Ploypailin Thongchampa	Individual foil							
Patsara Manunya	Individual sabre							
Pornsawan Ngernrungruangroj	Individual sabre							
Tonkhaw Pokeaw	Individual sabre							
Tonpan Pokeaw	Individual sabre							
Team Thailand; Patsara Manunya; Pornsawan Ngernrungruangroj; Tonkhaw Pokeaw; Tonpan Pokeaw	Team sabre							

== Field hockey ==
The Thai Hockey Association entered Thailand men's and women's national hockey team into the Asian Games tournament.

Summary

Key:
- ET – After extra time
- P – Match decided by penalty-shootout.

Team	Event	Group Stage						Semifinal	Final / BM / Pl.	
Team	Event	Opposition Score	Opposition Score	Opposition Score	Opposition Score	Opposition Score	Rank	Opposition Score	Opposition Score	Rank
Thailand men's	Men's tournament	Pakistan; L 0–10	Malaysia; L 0–10	Oman; L 0–2	Bangladesh; L 1–3	Kazakhstan; W 3–2	5	Did not advance	Indonesia; W 2–1	9
Thailand women's	Women's tournament	Kazakhstan; L 1–3	South Korea; L 0–3	Indonesia; W 2–0	India; L 0–5	—N/a	3	Did not advance	Malaysia; L 0–2	6

=== Men's tournament ===
Roster

The following is the Thailand roster in the men's field hockey tournament of the 2018 Asian Games.

Head coach: (South Korea) Kim Kyung-soo

1. Suriphong Jongjum (GK)
2. Theerachai Sansamran
4. Thanop Kampanthong
5. Chakan Boonmee
6. Sadakorn Vimuttanon (C)
8. Aphiwat Thanperm
9. Nisman Maseela
12. Ratthawit Khamkong
16. Norrawich Intani
17. Seksit Samoechai
20. Borirak Harapan
21. Wallop Khamwong
24. Wirawat Singthong
26. Thanakrit Boon-Art
27. Wiros Yosiri
28. Adisuan Suphawong
29. Tanakit Juntakian
30. Sataporn Phakhunthod

Pool B

Pos	Team	Pld	W	D	L	PF	PA	PD	Pts	Qualification
1	Pakistan	5	5	0	0	45	1	+44	15	Semi-finals
2	Malaysia	5	4	0	1	41	6	+35	12	Semi-finals
3	Bangladesh	5	3	0	2	11	15	−4	9	Fifth place game
4	Oman	5	2	0	3	7	19	−12	6	Seventh place game
5	Thailand	5	1	0	4	4	27	−23	3	Ninth place game
6	Kazakhstan	5	0	0	5	5	45	−40	0	Eleventh place game

Source: FIH
Rules for classification: 1) points; 2) goal difference; 3) goals scored; 4) head-to-head result.

20 August 2018
12:00

Pakistan	10–0	Thailand
Arshad 15', 50'; Irfan 22'; Atiq 23', 39', 43'; Mahnood 31'; Ali 33'; Mahmood 42', 49'	Report

Umpires:
Gus Soteriades (USA)
Michihiko Watanabe (JPN)

22 August 2018
16:00

Malaysia	10–0	Thailand
M.A. Hassan 6'; Fa. Saari 19'; Ashaari 19'; Rahim 21'; A. Hassan 27'; Saabah 28', 40'; Aideed 37'; Tajuddin 44'; Fi. Saari 57'	Report

Umpires:
Kim Hong-lae (KOR)
Dayan Dissanayake (SRI)

24 August 2018
10:00

Oman	2–0	Thailand
Al-Shaaibi 6'; Al-Qasmi 55'	Report

Umpires:
Kim Hong-lae (KOR)
You Suolong (CHN)

26 August 2018
16:00

Thailand	1–3	Bangladesh
Harapan 47'	Report	Islam 35', 41'; Hossain 55'

Umpires:
Javed Shaikh (IND)
Michihiko Watanabe (JPN)

28 August 2018
12:00

Thailand	3–2	Kazakhstan
Harapan 4'; Boon-Art 18'; Samoechai 22'	Report	Yelubayev 29'; Zhokenbayev 52'

Umpires:
Dayan Dissanayake (SRI)
You Suolong (CHN)

Ninth place game

30 August 2018
12:30

Indonesia	1–2	Thailand
Prastyo 18'	Report	Kampanthong 23'; Boon-Art 28'

Umpires:
Raghu Prasad (IND)
Salim Lucky (BAN)

=== Women's tournament ===
Roster

The following is the Thailand roster in the women's field hockey tournament of the 2018 Asian Games.

Head coach: (South Korea) Bae Young-wook

1. Alisa Narueangram (GK)
2. Pornsuree Toemsombatbowon
3. Suwapat Konthong
4. Kanyanat Nakpolkrung
5. Sirikwan Wongkeaw
6. Onuma Doungsuda
7. Tikhamporn Sakunpithak
8. Jenjira Inpa
9. Khwanchanok Suksin
10. Thanaporn Tongkham
11. Natthakarn Aunjai
12. Nasha Jutawijittam
13. Supansa Samanso (C)
14. Manassaree Prasanpim
15. Mutmee Maneepura
16. Anongnat Piresram
17. Kornkanok Sanpoung
18. Siraya Yimkrajang (GK)

Pool B

Pos	Team	Pld	W	D	L	PF	PA	PD	Pts	Qualification
1	India	4	4	0	0	38	1	+37	12	Semifinals
2	South Korea	4	3	0	1	17	4	+13	9	Semifinals
3	Thailand	4	1	0	3	3	11	−8	3	5th place game
4	Indonesia (H)	4	1	0	3	2	16	−14	3	7th place game
5	Kazakhstan	4	1	0	3	4	32	−28	3	9th place game

Source: FIH
Rules for classification: 1) points; 2) goal difference; 3) goals scored; 4) head-to-head result.
(H) Hosts

19 August 2018
14:00

Thailand	1–3	Kazakhstan
Aunjai 58'	Report	Domashneva 21'; Gataulina 33'; Sazontova 50'

Umpires:
Kelly Hudson (NZL)
Ayanna McClean (TTO)

23 August 2018
20:00

Thailand	0–3	South Korea
	Report	Park M 6'; Kim O 52'; Park S 54'

Umpires:
Liu Xiaoying (CHN)
Nur Hafizah Azman (MAS)

25 August 2018
16:00

Indonesia	0–2	Thailand
	Report	Sakunpithak 26', 41'

Umpires:
Nur Hafizah Azman (MAS)
Junko Wagatsuma (JPN)

27 August 2018
14:00

Thailand	0–5	India
	Report	Rampal 37', 46', 56'; Malik 52'; N. Kaur 55'

Umpires:
Junko Wagatsuma (JPN)
Chen Mei-chen (TPE)

Fifth place game

29 August 2018
15:00

Malaysia	2–0	Thailand
Rashid 22'; Onn 54'	Report

Umpires:
Cookie Tan (SGP)
Chen Mei-chen (TPE)

== Football ==
The Football Association of Thailand will enter Thailand men's and women's national football team into the Asian Games tournament.

Summary

Key:
- ET – After extra time
- P – Match decided by penalty-shootout.

Team	Event	Group Stage				Round of 16	Quarterfinal	Semifinal	Final / BM	
Team	Event	Opposition Score	Opposition Score	Opposition Score	Opposition Score	Rank	Opposition Score	Opposition Score	Opposition Score	Rank
Thailand men's	Men's tournament	Qatar; D 1–1	Bangladesh; D 1–1	Uzbekistan; L 0–1	3	did not advance				18
Thailand women's	Women's tournament	—N/a	Japan; L 0–2	Vietnam; L 2–3	3 Q	—N/a	China; L 0–5	did not advance		7

=== Men's tournament ===
Thailand competed in the group B at the men's team event.

Roster

The following is the Thailand squad in the men's football tournament of the 2018 Asian Games. The team of 20 players was officially named on 11 August.

Head coach: (Thailand) Worrawoot Srimaka

No.	Pos.	Player	Date of birth (age)	Caps	Goals	Club
1	GK	Kwanchai Suklom	12 January 1995 (aged 23)			(Football Association of Thailand) Prachuap
2	DF	Pawee Tanthatemee	22 October 1996 (aged 21)			(Football Association of Thailand) Ubon UMT United
3	DF	Suriya Singmui	7 April 1995 (aged 23)			(Football Association of Thailand) Chiangrai United
4	DF	Worawut Namvech	4 July 1995 (aged 23)			(Football Association of Thailand) Port
5	DF	Shinnaphat Leeaoh	2 February 1997 (aged 21)			(Football Association of Thailand) Chiangrai United
6	MF	Phitiwat Sukjitthammakul	1 February 1995 (aged 23)			(Football Association of Thailand) Chiangrai United
7	MF	Nopphon Ponkam	19 July 1996 (aged 22)			(Football Association of Thailand) Police Tero
8	MF	Worachit Kanitsribampen	24 August 1997 (aged 20)			(Football Association of Thailand) Chonburi
9	FW	Chenrop Samphaodi (captain)	2 June 1995 (aged 23)			(Football Association of Thailand) Muangthong United
10	MF	Chaiyawat Buran	26 October 1995 (aged 22)			(Football Association of Thailand) Chiangrai United
11	MF	Tanasith Siripala	9 August 1995 (aged 23)			(Football Association of Thailand) Suphanburi
12	MF	Ratthanakorn Maikami	7 January 1998 (aged 20)			(Football Association of Thailand) Buriram United
13	FW	Supachai Jaided	1 December 1998 (aged 19)			(Football Association of Thailand) Buriram United
14	MF	Montree Promsawat	27 August 1995 (aged 22)			(Football Association of Thailand) Ratchaburi Mitr Phol
15	DF	Saringkan Promsupa	29 March 1997 (aged 21)			(Football Association of Thailand) Muangthong United
16	MF	Sansern Limwattana	31 July 1997 (aged 21)			(Football Association of Thailand) Sukhothai
17	MF	Ekanit Panya	21 October 1999 (aged 18)			(Football Association of Thailand) Chiangmai
18	DF	Wanchai Jarunongkran	18 December 1996 (aged 21)			(Football Association of Thailand) Bangkok United
19	MF	Supachok Sarachat	22 May 1998 (aged 20)			(Football Association of Thailand) Buriram United
20	GK	Nont Muangngam	20 April 1997 (aged 21)			(Football Association of Thailand) Police Tero

* Over-aged player.

Group play

Pos	Team	Pld	W	D	L	GF	GA	GD	Pts	Qualification
1	Uzbekistan	3	3	0	0	10	0	+10	9	Advance to knockout stage
2	Bangladesh	3	1	1	1	2	4	−2	4	Advance to knockout stage
3	Thailand	3	0	2	1	2	3	−1	2	
4	Qatar	3	0	1	2	1	8	−7	1	

Source: Asian Games 2018
Rules for classification: Group stage tiebreakers
14 August 2018
19:00 UTC+7

Thailand	1–1	Qatar
Supachai 90+2'	Report	Shehata 6'

Pakansari Stadium, Cibinong
Referee: Yu Ming-hsun (Chinese Taipei)

16 August 2018
16:00 UTC+7

Bangladesh	1–1	Thailand
Sufil 52'	Report	Supachai 80'

Pakansari Stadium, Cibinong
Referee: Ali Reda (Lebanon)

19 August 2018
19:00 UTC+7

Thailand	0–1	Uzbekistan
	Report	Urinboev 17'

Pakansari Stadium, Cibinong
Referee: Bijan Heidari (Iran)

=== Women's tournament ===
Thailand competed in the group C at the women's team event.

Roster

The following is the Thailand squad in the women's football tournament of the 2018 Asian Games. The team of 20 players was officially named on 13 August.

Head coach: Nuengrutai Srathongvian

No.	Pos.	Player	Date of birth (age)	Club
18	GK	Sukanya Chor Charoenying	24 November 1987 (aged 30)	(Football Association of Thailand) Chonburi
22	GK	Nattaruja Muthtanawech	21 August 1996 (aged 21)	(Football Association of Thailand) BG–CAS
2	DF	Kanjanaporn Saenkhun	18 July 1996 (aged 22)	(Football Association of Thailand) BG–CAS
3	DF	Natthakarn Chinwong	15 March 1992 (aged 26)	(Football Association of Thailand) Chonburi
4	DF	Duangnapa Sritala	4 February 1986 (aged 32)	(Football Association of Thailand) Royal Thai Airforce
5	DF	Ainon Phancha	26 January 1992 (aged 26)	(Football Association of Thailand) Chonburi
9	DF	Warunee Phetwiset	13 December 1990 (aged 27)	(Football Association of Thailand) Chonburi
10	DF	Sunisa Srangthaisong	6 May 1988 (aged 29)	(Football Association of Thailand) BTU
6	MF	Pikul Khueanpet	20 September 1988 (aged 29)	(Football Association of Thailand) BG–CAS
7	MF	Silawan Intamee	22 January 1994 (aged 24)	(Football Association of Thailand) Chonburi
11	MF	Alisa Rukpinij	2 February 1995 (aged 23)	(Football Association of Thailand) Chonburi
12	MF	Rattikan Thongsombut	7 July 1991 (aged 26)	(Football Association of Thailand) BG–CAS
13	MF	Orathai Srimanee	12 June 1988 (aged 29)	(Football Association of Thailand) BG–CAS
15	MF	Nipawan Panyosuk	15 March 1995 (aged 23)	(Football Association of Thailand) Chonburi
19	MF	Pitsamai Sornsai	19 January 1989 (aged 29)	(Football Association of Thailand) Chonburi
20	MF	Wilaiporn Boothduang	25 June 1987 (aged 30)	(Football Association of Thailand) Royal Thai Airforce
21	MF	Kanjana Sungngoen	21 September 1986 (aged 31)	(Football Association of Thailand) Chonburi
25	MF	Sudarat Chuchuen	19 June 1997 (aged 21)	(Football Association of Thailand) BTU
8	FW	Suchawadee Nildhamrong	1 April 1997 (aged 21)	(United States Soccer Federation) California Golden Bears
17	FW	Taneekarn Dangda	15 December 1992 (aged 25)	(Football Association of Thailand) Chonburi

Group play

Pos	Team	Pld	W	D	L	GF	GA	GD	Pts	Qualification
1	Japan	2	2	0	0	9	0	+9	6	Advance to Knockout stage
2	Vietnam	2	1	0	1	3	9	−6	3	Advance to Knockout stage
3	Thailand	2	0	0	2	2	5	−3	0	Advance to Knockout stage

Source: Asian Games 2018
Rules for classification: Group stage tiebreakers
16 August 2018
18:30 UTC+7

Thailand	0–2	Japan
	Report	Iwabuchi 33'; Momiki 85'

Bumi Sriwijaya Stadium, Palembang
Referee: Mi Siyu (China)

19 August 2018
18:30 UTC+7

Vietnam	3–2	Thailand
Nguyễn Thị Tuyết Dung 22'; Nguyễn Thị Vạn 33'; Nguyễn Thị Liễu 40'	Report	Suchawadee 30' (pen.); Pitsamai 79'

Bumi Sriwijaya Stadium, Palembang
Referee: Mahsa Ghorbani (Iran)

Quarter-final

25 August 2018
19:30 UTC+7

China	5–0	Thailand
Wang Shuang 32', 84', 90+1'; Xiao Yuyi 65'; Gu Yasha 85'	Report

Gelora Sriwijaya Stadium, Palembang
Referee: Anna Sidorova (Uzbekistan)

== Golf ==
The Thailand Golf Association will enter seven golfers (4 men and 3 women golfers) into the Asian Games tournament.

=== Men's ===
Athlete	Event	Round 1	Round 2	Round 3	Round 4	Total		
Athlete	Event	Score	Score	Score	Score	Score	Par	Rank
Kosuke Hamamoto	Individual	72	70	70	71	283	–5	7
Sadom Kaewkanjana	Individual	70	70	70	72	282	–6	6
Vanchai Luangnitikul	Individual	79	69	75	70	293	+5	29
Witchayanon Chothirunrungrueng	Individual	73	74	71	70	288	E	20
Kosuke Hamamoto; Sadom Kaewkanjana; Vanchai Luangnitikul; Witchayanon Chothirunrungrueng	Team	215	209	211	211	846	–18	4

=== Women's ===
Athlete	Event	Round 1	Round 2	Round 3	Round 4	Total		
Athlete	Event	Score	Score	Score	Score	Score	Par	Rank
Atthaya Thitikul	Individual	70	70	69	71	280	–8	5
Kan Bunnabodee	Individual	76	72	74	73	295	+7	22
Kultida Pramphun	Individual	73	72	72	68	285	–3	9
Atthaya Thitikul; Kan Bunnabodee; Kultida Pramphun	Team	143	142	141	139	565	–11	4

== Gymnastics ==
The Gymnastics Association of Thailand will enter eleven gymnasts. (5 men and 6 women gymnasts) into the Asian Games tournament.

=== Artistic ===
==== Men's ====
===== Team =====
Athlete	Event	Apparatus						Total	Rank
Athlete	Event	F	PH	R	V	PB	HB	Total	Rank
Anawin Phothong	Team								
Jamorn Prommanee	Team								
Nattipong Aeadwong	Team								
Tikumporn Surintornta	Team								
Tissanupan Wichianpradit	Team								
Total	Team								

==== Women's ====
===== Team =====
Athlete	Event	Apparatus				Total	Rank
Athlete	Event	V	UB	BB	F	Total	Rank
Kanyanat Boontoeng	Team						
Praewpraw Doungchan	Team						
Sasiwimon Mueangphuan	Team						
Thidaporn Khanthara	Team						
Total	Team						

=== Rhythmic ===
==== Individual ====
Athlete	Event	Qualification						Final					
Athlete	Event	Hoop	Ball	Clubs	Ribbon	Total	Rank	Hoop	Ball	Clubs	Ribbon	Total	Rank
Benjaporn Limpanich	Individual	11.550	11.500	11.550	10.850	34.600	25 Q	9.950	9.150	10.600	10.300	40.000	22
Kanpitcha Patanasak	Individual	12.750	10.700	12.150	10.350	35.600	23 Q	9.850	10.700	12.000	11.720	43.750	19

== Handball ==
The Handball association of Thailand will enter Thailand women's national handball team into the Asian Games tournament.

Summary

Team	Event	Preliminary				Standing	Semifinals / Pl.	Final / BM / Pl.	
Team	Event	Opposition Score	Opposition Score	Opposition Score	Opposition Score	Standing	Opposition Score	Opposition Score	Rank
Thailand women's	Women's tournament	Japan; L 16–41	Indonesia; W 34–16	Hong Kong; W 30–24	Malaysia; W 40–12	2 Q	South Korea; L 13–40	Japan; L 14–43	4

=== Women's tournament ===
Thailand will compete in group B at the women's team event.

Roster

No.	Pos.	Name	Date of birth (age)	Height	App.	Goals	Club
1	GK	Pakakan Thongkot	7 October 1995 (age 30)	1.70 m
2	LW	Pawinee Bunjarern	8 June 1995 (age 30)	1.64 m
3	P	Preechaya Junmanee	26 January 1999 (age 27)	1.71 m
4	CB	Thitima Sriratbuaphan	11 June 1997 (age 28)	1.55 m
5	RW	Wantanee Wichaisang	7 November 2000	1.65 m
6	RB	Jenjira Paochanoun	10 June 1994 (age 31)	1.69 m
7	LB	Chuenkamol Inthong	26 September 1995 (age 30)	1.70 m
8	RW	Suphaporn Yaemyim	13 August 1997 (age 28)	1.65 m
9	LW	Nuttawadee Saisod	1 September 1999 (age 26)	1.67 m
10	CB	Kwanruedi Srithamma	3 May 1993	1.69 m
11	P	Nittaya Joisakoo	30 June 1996 (age 29)	1.82 m
12	GK	Kawinthida Janjit	13 September 1997 (age 28)	1.68 m
13	P	Siriyaporn Boonnet	13 May 1999 (age 27)	1.77 m
14	CB	Sunanta Hongbooddee	1 January 1994 (age 32)	1.67 m
15	RB	Dujduan Matarit	8 January 1995 (age 31)	1.67 m
16	GK	Suphansa Thongnum	28 May 1996 (age 30)	1.70 m

Group play

Pos	Team	Pld	W	D	L	GF	GA	GD	Pts	Qualification
1	Japan	4	4	0	0	208	38	+170	8	Semifinals
2	Thailand	4	3	0	1	120	93	+27	6	Semifinals
3	Hong Kong	4	2	0	2	112	97	+15	4	Classification 5th–8th
4	Indonesia	4	1	0	3	56	146	−90	2	Classification 5th–8th
5	Malaysia	4	0	0	4	45	167	−122	0	Classification 9th–10th

Source: AHF

14 August; 14:00	Thailand	16–41	Japan	POPKI Sports Hall, Jakarta; Referees: Tavakkoli, Valadkhanian (IRI)
14 August; 14:00	Bunjarern 7	(6–23)	Akiyama 8	POPKI Sports Hall, Jakarta; Referees: Tavakkoli, Valadkhanian (IRI)
14 August; 14:00	4× (yellow card) 2× (suspension)		3× (yellow card) 4× (suspension)	POPKI Sports Hall, Jakarta; Referees: Tavakkoli, Valadkhanian (IRI)

16 August; 11:00	Thailand	34–16	Indonesia	POPKI Sports Hall, Jakarta; Referees: Li, Ke (CHN)
16 August; 11:00	Hongbooddee 10	(19–6)	Wijayatri 4	POPKI Sports Hall, Jakarta; Referees: Li, Ke (CHN)
16 August; 11:00	2× (yellow card) 3× (suspension)		3× (yellow card) 4× (suspension)	POPKI Sports Hall, Jakarta; Referees: Li, Ke (CHN)

19 August; 11:00	Thailand	30–24	Hong Kong	POPKI Sports Hall, Jakarta; Referees: Al-Wahibi, Al-Shahi (OMA)
19 August; 11:00	Bunjarern 10	(13–10)	Wu 7	POPKI Sports Hall, Jakarta; Referees: Al-Wahibi, Al-Shahi (OMA)
19 August; 11:00	2× (yellow card) 5× (suspension)		3× (yellow card) 4× (suspension)	POPKI Sports Hall, Jakarta; Referees: Al-Wahibi, Al-Shahi (OMA)

21 August; 16:00	Malaysia	12–40	Thailand	POPKI Sports Hall, Jakarta; Referees: Li, Ke (CHN)
21 August; 16:00	five players 2	(5–24)	Yaemyim 11	POPKI Sports Hall, Jakarta; Referees: Li, Ke (CHN)
21 August; 16:00	7× (suspension) 1× (red card)			POPKI Sports Hall, Jakarta; Referees: Li, Ke (CHN)

Semifinals

27 August; 11:00	South Korea	40–13	Thailand	POPKI Sports Hall, Jakarta; Referees: Ota, Shimajiri (JPN)
27 August; 11:00	Choi 9	(16–7)	Paochanoun, Yaemyim, Joisakoo 3	POPKI Sports Hall, Jakarta; Referees: Ota, Shimajiri (JPN)
27 August; 11:00	2× (yellow card) 1× (suspension)		2× (yellow card) 1× (suspension)	POPKI Sports Hall, Jakarta; Referees: Ota, Shimajiri (JPN)

Bronze medal game

30 August; 16:00	Thailand	14–43	Japan	POPKI Sports Hall, Jakarta; Referees: Lee, Lee (KOR)
30 August; 16:00	Bunjarern 6	(6–20)	Fujita, Akiyama, Kawata 6	POPKI Sports Hall, Jakarta; Referees: Lee, Lee (KOR)
30 August; 16:00	2× (yellow card) 5× (suspension)		3× (yellow card) 2× (suspension)	POPKI Sports Hall, Jakarta; Referees: Lee, Lee (KOR)

== Jet ski ==
The Jet Ski Association of Thailand will enter eight jet-skiers into the Asian Games tournament.

Athlete	Event	Round 1	Round 2	Round 3	Round 4	Total	
Athlete	Event	Score	Score	Score	Score	Score	Rank
Suphathat Footrakul	Endurance runabout open	368	360	360	—N/a	1088	3rd place, bronze medalist(s)
Teera Settura	Endurance runabout open	360	348	348	—N/a	1056	5
Phadit Buree	Runabout 1100 stock	60	60	60	22	202	2nd place, silver medalist(s)
Attapon Kunsa	Runabout 1100 stock	53	53	39	60	205	1st place, gold medalist(s)
Chalermpoj Viriyahphan	Runabout limited	48	39	30	27	144	7
Supak Settura	Runabout limited	24	24	60	36	144	6
Kasidit Teeraprateep	Ski modified	60	48	36	38	182	2nd place, silver medalist(s)
Nuttakorn Pupakdee	Ski modified	43	43	43	48	177	3rd place, bronze medalist(s)

== Judo ==
The Judo Association of Thailand will enter ten judoka. (4 men and 6 women judokas) into the Asian Games tournament.

=== Men's ===
Athlete	Event	Round of 64	Round of 32	Round of 16	Quarterfinals	Semifinals	Repechage	Final / BM	
Athlete	Event	Opposition Result	Opposition Result	Opposition Result	Opposition Result	Opposition Result	Opposition Result	Opposition Result	Rank
Surasak Puntanam	Half lightweight	—N/a	Bye	Battogtokhyn Erkhembayar (MGL); L 00–01S1	did not advance				
Masayuki Terada	Half middleweight	—N/a	Bye	Didar Khamza (KAZ); L 00S1–01S1	did not advance				
Kittipong Hantratin	Middleweight	—N/a	Bye	Islam Bozbayev (KAZ); L 00S2–01S2	did not advance				
Wei Puyang	Half heavyweight	—N/a	Bye	Lkhagvasürengiin Otgonbaatar (MGL); L 00–10S1	did not advance				

=== Women's ===
Athlete	Event	Round of 64	Round of 32	Round of 16	Quarterfinals	Semifinals	Repechage	Final / BM	
Athlete	Event	Opposition Result	Opposition Result	Opposition Result	Opposition Result	Opposition Result	Opposition Result	Opposition Result	Rank
Akari Warasiha	Extra lightweight	—N/a	—N/a	Jon Yu-sun (PRK); L 01–10	did not advance				
Kachakorn Warasiha	Half lightweight	—N/a	Bye	Wang Xin (CHN); W 10–00	Rim Song-sim (PRK); L 00–10	Chen Chin-ying (TPE); W 10–00S2	Ganboldyn Gantsetseg (MGL); W 01S2–00S1	Did not advance	3rd place, bronze medalist(s)
Yuriko Warasiha	Lightweight	—N/a	Bye	Momo Tamaoki (JPN); L 00–10	did not advance				
Orapin Senatham	Half middleweight	—N/a	—N/a	Iolanta Berdybekova (KAZ); W 10–00	Kiyomi Watanabe (PHI); L 00–10	did not advance			
Surattana Thongsri	Middleweight	—N/a	—N/a	Mariya Takahashi (PHI); L 00S1–10	did not advance				
Ikumi Oeda	Half heavyweight	—N/a	—N/a	Bye	Ma Zhenzhao (CHN); L 00–1021	Khonema Chanthakoummane (LAO); W 10–00	Nodira Yuldasheva (UZB); W 01S1–00S2	Did not advance	3rd place, bronze medalist(s)

== Ju-jitsu ==
The Ju-jitsu Association of Thailand will enter fourteen ju-jitsu athletes (10 men and 4 women ju-jitsu athletes) into the Asian Games tournament.

=== Men's ===
Athlete	Event	1/16 Finals	1/8 Finals	1/4 Finals	Final of Tables	Final / BM	Rank
Athlete	Event	Opposition Result	Opposition Result	Opposition Result	Opposition Result	Opposition Result	Rank
Suwijak Kuntong	–56 kg	Sattar (IRI); W 9–0	Amirov (KAZ); L 4–13	did not advance			
Payoongsak Singchalad	–56 kg	Bye	Ruziev (UZB); L 0–6	did not advance			
Woraman Jangsawang	–62 kg	Abdizhamil (KGZ); L 0–7	did not advance				
Sarin Soonthorn	–62 kg	Khousrog (IRQ); DSQ	Kekenov (KGZ); L 0–2	did not advance			
Banpot Lertthaisong	–69 kg	Lim (PHI); W 0–0	Chua (SIN); W 0–0	Al Alabd (IRQ); W 9–0	Bagynbai (KGZ); L 2–4	Uranov (KGZ); W 5–0	3rd place, bronze medalist(s)
Ratcharat Yimprai	–69 kg	Saputera (INA); L 0–2	did not advance				
Sooknatee Suntra	–77 kg	Guggenheim (PHI); L 0–4	did not advance				
Rachata Ngamyoo	–77 kg	Tumurtogoo (MGL); L 0–5	did not advance				
Karun Sangsin	–85 kg	Bye	Jorayev (TKM); L 0–100	did not advance			
Natdanai Netthip	–94 kg	Bye	Makhashev (KAZ); L 0–100	did not advance			

=== Women's ===
Athlete	Event	1/16 Finals	1/8 Finals	1/4 Finals	Final of Tables	Final / BM	Rank
Athlete	Event	Opposition Result	Opposition Result	Opposition Result	Opposition Result	Opposition Result	Rank
Suwanan Boonsorn	–49 kg	Khan (CAM); L 0–100	did not advance				
Siramol Deepudsa	–49 kg	Bye	Ochoa (PHI); L 0–2	did not advance			
Orapa Senatham	–62 kg	Mohammadbandbouni (IRI); W 3–0	Sung K-r (KOR); L 0–26	did not advance			
Onanong Sangsirichok	–62 kg	Eppinger (PHI); L 0–2	Lien (SIN); L 0–100	did not advance			

== Kabaddi ==
Summary

Team	Event	Group Stage					Semifinal	Final	
Team	Event	Opposition Score	Opposition Score	Opposition Score	Opposition Score	Rank	Opposition Score	Opposition Score	Rank
Thailand men's	Men's tournament	South Korea; L 21–52	Bangladesh; L 22–34	Sri Lanka; L 29–46	India; L 30–49	5	did not advance		
Thailand women's	Women's tournament	Sri Lanka; W 41–15	India; L 23–33	Japan; W 43–12	Indonesia; W 35–15	2 Q	Iran; L 16–23	Did not advance	3rd place, bronze medalist(s)

=== Men's tournament ===
Team roster

- Khunakon Chanjaroen
- Rittichai Jaisai
- Khomsan Thongkham
- Teerasak Khunsan
- Somboon Asa
- Pramot Saising
- Sasithon Rungsawang
- Worawut Chuaikoed
- Phuwanai Wannasaen
- Janwit Diskanan
- Santi Bunchoet
- Kittichai Kanket

Group A

Pos	Team	Pld	W	D	L	PF	PA	PD	Pts	Qualification
1	South Korea	4	4	0	0	147	84	+63	8	Semifinals
2	India	4	3	0	1	166	103	+63	6	Semifinals
3	Bangladesh	4	2	0	2	102	135	−33	4	
4	Sri Lanka	4	1	0	3	121	135	−14	2	
5	Thailand	4	0	0	4	102	181	−79	0	

Source: OCA

19 August
16:00

South Korea	52–21 (HT: 22–15)	Thailand

Garuda Theatre, Jakarta

20 August
14:00

Bangladesh	34–22 (HT: 17–7)	Thailand

Garuda Theatre, Jakarta

20 August
18:00

Sri Lanka	46–29 (HT: 26–10)	Thailand

Garuda Theatre, Jakarta

21 August
17:00

India	49–30 (HT: 21–12)	Thailand

Garuda Theatre, Jakarta

=== Women's tournament ===
Team roster

- Alisa Limsamran
- Namfon Kangkeeree
- Nuntarat Nuntakitkoson
- Kamontip Suwanchana
- Wassana Rachmanee
- Saowapa Chueakhao
- Atchara Puangngern
- Charinda Yindee
- Panthida Khamthat
- Kannika Munmai
- Bencharat Khwanchai
- Naleerat Ketsaro

Group A

Pos	Team	Pld	W	D	L	PF	PA	PD	Pts	Qualification
1	India	4	4	0	0	168	69	+99	8	Semifinals
2	Thailand	4	3	0	1	142	75	+67	6	Semifinals
3	Sri Lanka	4	2	0	2	83	113	−30	4	
4	Indonesia	4	1	0	3	84	145	−61	2	
5	Japan	4	0	0	4	63	138	−75	0	

Source: OCA

19 August
10:40

Sri Lanka	15–41 (HT: 7–24)	Thailand

Garuda Theatre, Jakarta

20 August
10:40

India	33–23 (HT: 12–10)	Thailand

Garuda Theatre, Jakarta

21 August
10:40

Japan	12–43 (HT: 4–28)	Thailand

Garuda Theatre, Jakarta

23 August
11:00

Indonesia	15–35 (HT: 6–18)	Thailand

Garuda Theatre, Jakarta

Semifinals

23 August
15:50

Iran	23–16 (HT: 17–8)	Thailand

Garuda Theatre, Jakarta

== Karate ==
Thailand participated in the karate competition at the Games with eight athletes (4 men's and 4 women's).

== Kurash ==
Men

Athlete	Event	Round of 32	Round of 16	Quarterfinal	Semifinal	Final	
Athlete	Event	Opposition Score	Opposition Score	Opposition Score	Opposition Score	Opposition Score	Rank
Gun Jakwiwattanakul	–66 kg	Kao S (TPE); L 001−101	did not advance				
Pharuehatphasathonbodee Suwannaphueng	–81 kg	A Yermekbayev (KAZ); W 100−004	Huang C-t (TPE); L 000−101	did not advance			

Women

Athlete	Event	Round of 32	Round of 16	Quarterfinal	Semifinal	Final	
Athlete	Event	Opposition Score	Opposition Score	Opposition Score	Opposition Score	Opposition Score	Rank
Nichakan Seesai	–52 kg	Bye	Văn NT (VIE); L 000−100	did not advance			
Prapathip Narkkarach	–63 kg	KN Shifa (INA); L 000−003	did not advance				
Prawanwit Meesri	–78 kg	J Tokas (IND); L 001−001	did not advance				

== Modern pentathlon ==
Athlete	Event	Swimming (200 m freestyle)		Fencing (épée one touch)		Riding (show jumping)		Laser-run (shooting 10 m air pistol/ running 3200 m)		Total points	Final rank
Athlete	Event	Rank	MP points	Rank	MP points	Rank	MP points	Rank	MP points	Total points	Final rank
Ruchapoom Infaktha	Men's	10	294	11	179	13	0 (DNS)	12	502	975	13
Phurit Yohuang	Men's	2	312	13	138	13	0 (DNS)	13	478	928	14
Sanruthai Aransiri	Women's	8	285	10	186	10	0 (DNS)	12	326	797	11
Tirada Prasongpol	Women's	13	222	8	203	10	0 (DNS)	13	287	712	13

== Paragliding ==
=== Men's ===
Athlete	Event	Round 1	Round 2	Round 3	Round 4	Round 5	Round 6	Round 7	Round 8	Round 9	Round 10	Total	
Athlete	Event	Rank	Rank	Rank	Rank	Rank	Rank	Rank	Rank	Rank	Rank	Score	Rank
Jirasak Witeetham	Individual accuracy	2	2	1	10	2	2	2	2	2	2	27	2nd place, silver medalist(s)
Tanapat Luangiam	Individual accuracy	21	17	20	17	21	14	10	11	10	10	151	10
Sarayut Chinpongsatorn; Tanapat Luangiam; Mongkut Preecha; Jirasak Witeetham; Nithat Yangjui	Team accuracy	2	2	3	3	4	3	—N/a				17	3rd place, bronze medalist(s)
	Team cross-country	7	7	7	6	6	—N/a					5201	6

=== Women's ===
Athlete	Event	Round 1	Round 2	Round 3	Round 4	Round 5	Round 6	Round 7	Round 8	Round 9	Round 10	Total	
Athlete	Event	Rank	Rank	Rank	Rank	Rank	Rank	Rank	Rank	Rank	Rank	Score	Rank
Nunnapat Phuchong	Individual accuracy	3	2	2	2	3	2	2	1	1	1	19	1st place, gold medalist(s)
Chantika Chaisanuk	Individual accuracy	6	4	5	5	4	4	4	5	5	4	46	4
Chantika Chaisanuk; Nunnapat Phuchong; Narubhorn Wathaya	Team accuracy	1	3	3	2	1	1	—N/a				11	1st place, gold medalist(s)
	Team cross-country	6	4	4	4	4	—N/a					1899	4

== Pencak silat ==
=== Men's ===
Seni

Athlete	Event	Preliminary		Final	
Athlete	Event	Result	Rank	Result	Rank
Ilyas Sadara	Singles	460	1	460	2nd place, silver medalist(s)
Adisak Jehna; Beela Nawae	Doubles	—N/a		560	4
Fadil Dama; Masofee Wani; Islamee Wani	Team	—N/a		448	3rd place, bronze medalist(s)

Tanding

Athlete	Event	Round of 16	Quarterfinals	Semifinals	Final	
Athlete	Event	Opposition Result	Opposition Result	Opposition Result	Opposition Result	Rank
Sobri Cheni	55 kg	Bye	Malik (INA); L 0 – 5	did not advance		
Adilan Chemaeng	60 kg	Bye	Toichuev (KGZ); W 5 – 0	Kusumah (INA); L 0 – 5	Did not advance	3rd place, bronze medalist(s)
Pornteb Poolkaew	65 kg	Pratama (INA); L 0 – 5	did not advance			
Wutthichai Phuttan	70 kg	Bye	Phạm (VIE); L 0 – 5	did not advance		
Kuibrohem Kabaha	75 kg	Nur (SIN); W 5 – 0	Trần (VIE); L 0 – 5	did not advance		
Pimpirat Tonkhieo	90 kg	—N/a	Sobri (MAS); L 1 – 4	did not advance		
Tachin Pokjay	95 kg	Bye	Arshad (PAK); W 5 – 0	Yaacob (MAS); L 0 – 5	Did not advance	3rd place, bronze medalist(s)

=== Women's ===
Seni

Athlete	Event	Score		Total	
Athlete	Event	Result	Result	Result	Rank
Salini Mamu	Singles	459	2	438	5
Saowanee Chanthamunee; Oraya Choosuwan	Doubles	—N/a		564	2nd place, silver medalist(s)
As Ma Jeh Ma; Yuweeta Samahoh; Ruhana Chearbuli	Team	—N/a		448	3rd place, bronze medalist(s)

Tanding

Athlete	Event	Round of 16	Quarterfinals	Semifinals	Final	
Athlete	Event	Opposition Result	Opposition Result	Opposition Result	Opposition Result	Rank
Suda Lueangaphichatkun	55 kg	Niiazova (KGZ); W 5 – 0	Wita (INA); L 0 – 5	did not advance		
Paphawinee Kueakoboon	60 kg	Bye	Shahrem (SIN); L 0 – 5	did not advance		
Janejira Wankrue	65 kg	—N/a	Bye	Kamelia (INA); L 0 – 5	Did not advance	3rd place, bronze medalist(s)

== Roller sports ==
=== Skateboarding ===
Athlete	Event	Preliminary		Final	
Athlete	Event	Result	Rank	Result	Rank
Noppakorn Panutai	Men's park	57.66	7 Q	20.33	8
Pakorn Panutai	Men's park	45.66	10	did not advance	
Oat Athiwat	Men's street	26.9	3 Q	24.2	4
Petch Napat	Men's street	22.1	6 Q	20.3	6

=== Speed skating ===
Athlete	Event	Final	
Athlete	Event	Time	Rank
Noppron Choochorngamket	Men's road 20 km race	EL	9
Phatcharawee Nijun	Men's road 20 km race	DNF	–
Petpisut Siamchai	Women's road 20 km race	EL	14
Patjira Srisathitha	Women's road 20 km race	EL	9

== Rowing ==
Men

Athlete	Event	Heats		Repechage		Final	
Athlete	Event	Time	Rank	Time	Rank	Time	Rank
Siripong Chaiwichitchonkul	Single sculls	8:39.68	4 R	8:18.20	4 FB	8:01.41	10
Prem Nampratueng; Jaruwat Saensuk	Double sculls	7:07.42	2 FA	Bye		6:49.82	3rd place, bronze medalist(s)
Piyapong Arnunamang; Methasit Phromphoem; Prem Nampratueng; Jaruwat Saensuk	Quadruple sculls	6:23.40	2 R	6:39.31	4 FA	6:22.41	3rd place, bronze medalist(s)
Chanin Srisomboon; Sakon Somwang	Lightweight double sculls	7:21.78	3 R	7:39.53	4 FA	7:31.77	6

Women

Athlete	Event	Heats		Repechage		Final	
Athlete	Event	Time	Rank	Time	Rank	Time	Rank
Premruethai Hongseethong; Nuntida Krajangjam	Coxless pair	9:10.57	4 R	9:02.36	5 FB	8:32.08	8
Patchareeya Jardsakul; Nattariwan Nunchai; Premruethai Hongseethong; Nuntida Krajangjam	Coxless four	8:00.50	3 R	8:05.92	5	Did not advance	7
Irin Neegree	Lightweight single sculls	8:57.26	6 FA	—N/a		8:59.30	6
Matinee Raruen; Phuttharaksa Neegree	Lightweight double sculls	8:08.56	4 FA	—N/a		7:54.23	3rd place, bronze medalist(s)
Phuttharaksa Neegree; Tippaporn Pitukpaothai; Rojjana Raklao; Matinee Raruen	Lightweight quadruple sculls	7:32.64	2 R	7:29.95	2 FA	7:10.85	4

== Rugby sevens ==
Thailand rugby sevens men's team drawn in group A, while the women's team entered the group B.

Team	Event	Preliminary	Standing	Quarterfinal	Semifinal / Pl.	Final / BM / Pl.	
Team	Event	Opposition Score	Standing	Opposition Score	Opposition Score	Opposition Score	Rank
Thailand men's	Men's tournament	Group A China: L 7–40; Pakistan: W 43–0; Hong Kong: L 7–36	3 Q	Hong Kong; L 0–52	Malaysia; L 12–33	Chinese Taipei; L 19–24	8
Thailand women's	Women's tournament	Group B Kazakhstan: L 5–20; Indonesia: L 53–5; Japan: L 0–26	3 Q	Hong Kong; W 17–5	China; L 5–29	Kazakhstan; L 7–29	4

=== Men's tournament ===
Squad

The following is the Thailand squad in the men's rugby sevens tournament of the 2018 Asian Games.

Head coach: Tanyavit Kuasint

- Khomchak Chakrabandhu Na Ayudhaya
- Sarut Janda
- Warongkorn Khamkoet
- Noppasit Kradkrayang
- Klin Laksanasompong
- Sichon Nakarin
- Puvadol Palukpetch
- Panupong Puangpun
- Wuttipong Sakunthingthong
- Sumet Thammaporn
- Akarin Thitisakulvit
- Chatree Wannadit

Group A

Pos	Team	Pld	W	D	L	PF	PA	PD	Pts	Qualification
1	Hong Kong	3	3	0	0	142	29	+113	9	Quarterfinals
2	China	3	2	0	1	110	49	+61	7	Quarterfinals
3	Thailand	3	1	0	2	57	76	−19	5	Quarterfinals
4	Pakistan	3	0	0	3	5	160	−155	3	Ranking round 9–12

Source: Results

30 August
12:28

China	40–7	Thailand
Try: Shan (2) 2' c, 9' m Feng (2) 6' c, 7+' c Li 8' c Qi 14+' c Con: Shan (4/5); Qi (1/1)		Try: Thitisakulvit 4' c Con: Khamkoet (1/1)

Gelora Bung Karno Rugby Field, Jakarta
Referee: Suguru Kamamuta (Japan)

30 August
16:08

Thailand	43–0	Pakistan
Try: Thitisakulvit (2) 3' m, 11' c Palukpetch 4' m Khamkoet 7' c Puangpun 8' m Chakrabandhu 10' c Kradkrayang 14' c Con: Khamkoet (1/3); Thitisakulvit (2/3); Laksanasompong (1/1)

Gelora Bung Karno Rugby Field, Jakarta
Referee: Noriaki Hashimoto (Japan)

31 August
13:12

Hong Kong	36–7	Thailand
Try: Herbert 2' c Yiu 3' c Jones (2) 7+' m, 14' m Rimene 11' m Coverdale 12' c Con: Hood (1/1); Rimene (2/5)		Try: Janda 6' c Con: Khamkoet (1/1)

Gelora Bung Karno Rugby Field, Jakarta
Referee: Noriaki Hashimoto (Japan)

Quarterfinal

31 August
18:20

Hong Kong	52–0	Thailand
Try: Yiu 1' c Hood (2) 2' c, 7+' m Nardoni 6' c Denmark (2) 8' c, 14' m Jones 10' c Kwok 13' c Con: Hood (2/3); Rimene (3/3); Stiles (1/2)

Gelora Bung Karno Rugby Field, Jakarta
Referee: Suguru Kamamuta (Japan)

Classification semifinal (5–8)

1 September
16:34

Malaysia	33–12	Thailand
Try: Ismail 3' c Zulkifli 4' c Jalil 6' c Nasarrudin 7+' m Mat Zizi 8' c Con: Mat Zizi (4/5)		Try: Puangpun 10' m Chakrabandhu 12' c Con: Khamkoet (1/2)

Gelora Bung Karno Rugby Field, Jakarta
Referee: Noriaki Hashimoto (Japan)

Seventh place game

1 September
18:46

Chinese Taipei	24–19	Thailand
Try: Shen M. 1' c Hsieh 7+' m Huang P. 10' c Chang L. 13' m Con: Huang P. (2/4)		Try: Sakulthianthong 6' c Kradkrayang (2) 7' m, 12' c Con: Khamkoet (2/3)

Gelora Bung Karno Rugby Field, Jakarta
Referee: Craig Chan (Canada)

=== Women's tournament ===
Squad

The following is the Thailand squad in the women's rugby sevens tournament of the 2018 Asian Games.

Head coach: (Japan) Tetsuhiro Onaka

- Butsaya Bunrak
- Piyamat Chomphumee
- Thanaporn Huankid
- Uthumporn Liamrat
- Wannaree Meechok
- Ruksina Navakaew
- Jeeraporn Peerabunanon
- Tidarat Sawatnam
- Rasamee Sisongkham
- Thanachporn Wandee
- Rattanaporn Wittayaronnayut
- Chitchanok Yusri

Group B

Pos	Team	Pld	W	D	L	PF	PA	PD	Pts	Qualification
1	Japan	3	3	0	0	122	21	+101	9	Quarterfinals
2	Kazakhstan	3	2	0	1	95	36	+59	7	Quarterfinals
3	Thailand	3	1	0	2	58	51	+7	5	Quarterfinals
4	Indonesia	3	0	0	3	5	172	−167	3	Quarterfinals

Source: Results

30 August
12:06

Kazakhstan	20–5	Thailand
Try: Nurmatova 7' m Korotkikh (3) 7+' m, 8' m, 10' m Con: Baktybayeva (0/2); Nurmatova (0/1)		Try: Wittayaronnayut 13' m Con: Chomphumee (0/1)

Gelora Bung Karno Rugby Field, Jakarta
Referee: Sakurako Kawasaki (Japan)

30 August
15:24

Thailand	53–5	Indonesia
Try: Bunrak 3' m Yusri (2) 4' m, 7+' m Huankid 7' c Wandee (2) 9' m, 11' m Meechok 12' c Liamrat (2) 13' c, 14+' c Con: Bunrak (4/7); Sawatnam (0/1); Meechok (0/1)		Try: Lahu 2' m Con: Soni (0/1)

Gelora Bung Karno Rugby Field, Jakarta
Referee: Craig Chan (Canada)

31 August
11:14

Japan	26–0	Thailand
Try: Hirano (2) 5' c, 9' m Nakamura 12' c Kurogi 14' c Con: Okuroda (3/4)

Gelora Bung Karno Rugby Field, Jakarta
Referee: Phoenix Xu (China)

Quarterfinal

31 August
15:46

Hong Kong	5–17	Thailand
Try: V. Poon 6' m Con: S. Chan (0/1)		Try: Huankid 2' m Chomphumee 10' c Yusri 12' m Con: Bunrak (0/2); Sawatnam (1/1)

Gelora Bung Karno Rugby Field, Jakarta
Referee: Ai Yoshida (Japan)

Semifinal

1 September
15:28

China	29–5	Thailand
Try: Chen K. (2) 3' c, 11' m Yang 9' m Wang 13' m Hu 14+' c Con: Chen K. (1/2); Yu X. (0/1); Yang (0/1); Chen M. (1/1)		Try: Wittayaronnayut 7' m Con: Bunrak (0/1)

Gelora Bung Karno Rugby Field, Jakarta
Referee: Sakurako Kawasaki (Japan)

Bronze medal game

1 September
19:52

Thailand	7–29	Kazakhstan
Try: Penalty try 10' m		Try: Korotkikh (2) 2' c, 7+' m Stepanyuga 4' m Baktybayeva (2) 12' c, 14' m Con: Baktybayeva (2/4); Nurmatova (0/1)

Gelora Bung Karno Rugby Field, Jakarta
Referee: Ai Yoshida (Japan)

== Sailing ==
Men

Athlete	Event	Race															Total	Rank
Athlete	Event	1	2	3	4	5	6	7	8	9	10	11	12	13	14	15	Total	Rank
Natthaphong Phonoppharat	RS:X	6	5	5	5	~~(11)~~; OCS	5	6	6	6	5	5	5	4	8	4	75	6
Keerati Bualong	Laser	4	7	4	6	5	7	7	~~(9)~~	3	6	4	4	—N/a			57	5
Don Whitcraft; Dylan Whitcraft	49er	~~(8)~~	4	3	5	1	3	2	4	6	1	5	4	2	7	6	53	5
Navee Thamsoontorn; Nut Butmarasri	470	5	5	3	5	4	6	5	4	3	1	1	~~(7)~~	—N/a			42	3rd place, bronze medalist(s)

Women

Athlete	Event	Race															Total	Rank
Athlete	Event	1	2	3	4	5	6	7	8	9	10	11	12	13	14	15	Total	Rank
Siripon Kaewduang-ngam	RS:X	3	3	4	~~(5)~~	3	3	3	3	2	1	3	3	3	3	4	41	3rd place, bronze medalist(s)
Kamolwan Chanyim	Laser Radial	4	~~(5)~~	2	5	2	5	2	5	3	3	3	4	—N/a			38	4
Nichapa Waiwai; Kamonchanok Klahan	49er FX	3	~~(4)~~	4	4	2	3	3	3	3	3	4	3	2	2	3	42	3rd place, bronze medalist(s)
Narisara Satta; Sutida Poonpat	470	4	5	3	3	6	~~(8)~~; DSQ	6	5	5	5	4	5	—N/a			51	5

Mixed

Athlete	Event	Race															Total	Rank
Athlete	Event	1	2	3	4	5	6	7	8	9	10	11	12	13	14	15	Total	Rank
Saranwong Poonpat	Laser 4.7	2	6	6	7	6	4	8	16	~~(24)~~; UFD	17	15	2	—N/a			89	8
Chanokchon Wangsuk	Laser 4.7	12	14	17	17	16	15	18	4	11	10	10	~~(20)~~	—N/a			144	16
Bunyarit Sangngern; Cholchaya Junthonglang	RS:One	11	9	7	10	10	11	~~(12)~~	8	10	12	8	7	7	6	10	126	5

== Sambo ==
Key:
- SU – Won by submission.

Athlete	Event	Round of 32	Round of 16	Quarterfinal	Semifinal	Repechage 1	Repechage 2	Repechage final	Final / BM	
Athlete	Event	Opposition Result	Opposition Result	Opposition Result	Opposition Result	Opposition Result	Opposition Result	Opposition Result	Opposition Result	Rank
Sonram Jenghor	Men's 90 kg	N Yokubov (UZB); L 0–8	did not advance							
Thanawat Tampapanna	Men's 90 kg	M Sarwari (AFG); WO	N Orazmämmedow (TKM); L 0–9	did not advance						
Titapa Junsookplung	Women's 68 kg	Bye	N Davletova (UZB); L 0–8	did not advance		S Silva (LBN); WO	M Amanda (INA); W 3–0	T Battsetseg (MGL); L 0–8	did not advance	
Saitan Somching	Women's 68 kg	Bye	N Tomi (JPN); L 0–9	did not advance						

== Sepak takraw ==
The Takraw Association of Thailand will enter four events from six events into the Asian Games tournament. The four events will be Men's duo regu, Men's team, Women's duo regu and Women's team. This will be the first time that Thailand enter duo regu events in twelve years after the host rejected the regu events. Thai's sepak takraw team will consist of 27 athletes (15 men's and 12 female) under coach Kamon Tankimhong. Thailand target with four gold medals.

=== Men's ===
Athlete	Event	Preliminary round			Semifinal	Final / BM	
Athlete	Event	Opposition Score	Opposition Score	Rank	Opposition Score	Opposition Score	Rank
Anuwat Chaichana; Seksan Tubtong; Pornchai Kaokaew; Wichan Temkort; Pattarapong Yupadee; Suriyon Koonpimon; Assadin Wongyota; Rachan Viphan; Jirasak Pakbuangoen	Team doubles	Myanmar; W 2 – 1	Laos; W 3 – 0	1 Q	Japan; W 2 – 0	Laos; W 2 – 0	1st place, gold medalist(s)
Anuwat Chaichana; Siriwat Sakha; Thawisak Thongsai; Pornchai Kaokaew; Pattarapong Yupadee; Assadin Wongyota; Thanawat Chumsena; Rachan Viphan; Sittipong Khamchan; Jirasak Pakbuangoen; Kritsanapong Nontakote; Jantarit Khukaeo	Team regu	Malaysia; W 3 – 0	South Korea; W 3 – 0	1 Q	India; W 2 – 0	Malaysia; W 2 – 0	1st place, gold medalist(s)

=== Women's ===
Athlete	Event	Preliminary round					Semifinal	Final / BM	
Athlete	Event	Opposition Score	Opposition Score	Opposition Score	Opposition Score	Rank	Opposition Score	Opposition Score	Rank
Masaya Duangsri; Sasiwimol Janthasit; Fueangfa Praphatsarang; Somruedee Pruepruk; Payom Srihongsa; Wiphada Chitphuan	Quadrant	Malaysia; W 2 – 0	Vietnam; W 2 – 0	Japan; W 2 – 0	India; W 2 – 0	1 Q	Laos; W 2 – 0	Vietnam; W 2 – 0	1st place, gold medalist(s)
Masaya Duangsri; Suputtra Beartong; Thitima Mahakusol; Kaewjai Pumsawangkaew; Sasiwimol Janthasit; Thidarat Soda; Fueangfa Praphatsarang; Nisa Thanaattawut; Nipaporn Salupphon; Somruedee Pruepruk; Payom Srihongsa; Wiphada Chitphuan	Team regu	—N/a	Laos; W 3 – 0	South Korea; W 3 – 0	India; W 3 – 0	1 Q	Myanmar; W 2 – 0	South Korea; W 2 – 0	1st place, gold medalist(s)

== Shooting ==
=== Men's ===
Event	Athlete	Qualification		Semifinal		Final	
Event	Athlete	Points	Rank	Points	Rank	Points	Rank
10 m air pistol	Natphanlert Auapinyakul	574	16	did not advance			
10 m air pistol	Pongpol Kulchairattana	572	20	did not advance			
25 m rapid fire pistol	Isaranuudom Phurihiranphat	564	14	did not advance			
25 m rapid fire pistol	Sriyanon Karndee	552	20	did not advance			
10 m air rifle	Pongsaton Panyatong	621.3	14	did not advance			
10 m air rifle	Napis Tortungpanich	619.4	16	did not advance			
50 m rifle 3 positions	Napis Tortungpanich	1164	3 Q	—N/a		396.0	7
50 m rifle 3 positions	Thongphaphum Vongsukdee	1164	5 Q	—N/a		394.7	8
Trap	Savete Sresthaporn	115	19	did not advance			
Trap	Chartchai Ularnwiriyakul	104	27	did not advance			
Skeet	Jiranunt Hathaichukiat	121	9	did not advance			
Skeet	Tanapat Jangpanich	111	24	did not advance			

=== Women's ===
Event	Athlete	Qualification		Semifinal		Final	
Event	Athlete	Points	Rank	Points	Rank	Points	Rank
10 m air pistol	Tanyaporn Prucksakorn	568	14	did not advance			
10 m air pistol	Natsara Champalat	567	15	did not advance			
25 m pistol	Tanyaporn Prucksakorn	584	4 Q	—N/a		20	5
25 m pistol	Naphaswan Yangpaiboon	585	3 Q	—N/a		34	2nd place, silver medalist(s)
10 m air rifle	Tararat Morakot	613.5	23	did not advance			
10 m air rifle	Thanyalak Chotphibunsin	610.6	29	did not advance			
50 m rifle 3 positions	Ratchadaporn Plengsaengthong	1154	12	did not advance			
50 m rifle 3 positions	Thanyalak Chotphibunsin	1149	15	did not advance			
Trap	Chattaya Kitcharoen	108	16	did not advance			
Trap	Napapha Pramuanchok	107	18	did not advance			
Double trap	Chattaya Kitcharoen	—N/a				108	10
Double trap	Napapha Pramuanchok	—N/a				90	14
Skeet	Sutiya Jiewchaloemmit	119	3 Q	—N/a		55	1st place, gold medalist(s)
Skeet	Nutchaya Sutarporn	111	11	did not advance			

=== Mixed's ===
Event	Athlete	Qualification		Semifinal		Final	
Event	Athlete	Points	Rank	Points	Rank	Points	Rank
10 m air pistol	Pongpol Kulchairattana; Tanyaporn Prucksakorn	758	8	did not advance			
10 m air rifle	Pongsaton Panyatong; Thanyalak Chotphibunsin	816	12	did not advance			
Trap	Savate Sresthaporn; Chattaya Kitcharoen	132	9	did not advance			

== Soft tennis ==
Athlete	Event	Group Stage				Quarterfinals	Semifinals	Final	
Athlete	Event	Opposition Score	Opposition Score	Opposition Score	Rank	Opposition Score	Opposition Score	Opposition Score	Rank
Chaiwit Leampriboon	Men's singles	So J-i (THA); L 1–4	J Arcilla (PHI); W 4–3	—N/a	2	did not advance			
Sorrachet Uayporn	Men's singles	S Kann (CAM); W 4–1	J Menna (IND); W 4–1	—N/a	1 Q	P Simpatiaji (INA); L 0–4	did not advance		
Dares Srirungreang	Women's singles	PL Catindig (PHI); W 4–2	V Khan (PAK); W 4–0	C Bataa (MGL); W 4–0	1 Q	DR Pitri (INA); L 3–4	did not advance		
Sunatcha Kraiya	Women's singles	N Takahashi (JPN); L 0–4	Lee C-w (TPE); L 1–4	—N/a	3	did not advance			
Chaiwit Leampriboon; Thatdao Bunteng	Mixed doubles	S Orn / S Rin (CAM); W 5–2	N Damian Jr. / N Manalac (PHI); W 5–0	—N/a	1 Q	T Uematsu / R Hayashida (JPN); L 0–5	did not advance		
Worranun Ratthapobkorrapak; Sawitre Naree	Mixed doubles	Kim B-j / Kim J-y (KOR); L 1–5	S Yi / M Meth (CAM); W 5–3	—N/a	2	did not advance			
Sorrachet Uayporn; Chaiwit Leampriboon; Worranun Ratthapobkorrapak; Worrawoot Philuek; Kawin Yannarit	Men's team	Vietnam (VIE); W 3–0	Mongolia (MGL); L 1–2	Chinese Taipei (TPE); L 2–2	3	did not advance			
Dares Srirungreang; Sunatcha Kraiya; Sawitre Naree; Thatdao Bunteng; Natchatjira Kerdsomboon	Women's team	South Korea (KOR); L 0–3	Mongolia (MGL); W 3–0	India (IND); W 3–0	2 Q	Chinese Taipei (TPE); L 0–2	did not advance		

== Sport climbing ==
Speed

Athlete	Event	Qualification		Round of 16	Quarterfinals	Semifinals	Final / BM	
Athlete	Event	Best	Rank	Opposition Time	Opposition Time	Opposition Time	Opposition Time	Rank
Phanuphong Bunprakop	Men's	7.144	11 Q	A Maimuratov (KAZ); L FS	did not advance			16
Thatthana Raksachat	Men's	7.760	18	did not advance				
Narada Disyabut	Women's	11.413	16 Q	A S Rahayu (INA); L 12.750–8.198	did not advance			16
Pratthana Raksachat	Women's	11.000	13 Q	Song YL (CHN); L 11.702–10.889	did not advance			15

Speed relay

Athlete	Event	Qualification		Quarterfinals	Semifinals	Final / BM	
Athlete	Event	Time	Rank	Opposition Time	Opposition Time	Opposition Time	Rank
Thailand 1 Phanuphong Bunprakop; Thatthana Raksachat; Winai Ruangrit; Kritsadakorn Thongmung	Men's	25.471	8 Q	Indonesia 1 (INA); L 24.003–20.091	did not advance		5
Thailand 2 Teeraphon Boondech; Sirapob Jirajaturapak; Sorakarn Thongjaras	Men's	34.509	13	did not advance			
Thailand 1 Narada Disyabut; Pankaew Plypoolsup; Pratthana Raksachat; Puntarika Tunyavanich	Women's	36.158	7 Q	China 1 (CHN); L F–29.652	did not advance		7
Thailand 2 Boonwanit Artaui; Jiraporn Kaitwatcharachai; Sudarat Phoomsawat	Women's	54.315	11	did not advance			

Combined

Athlete	Event	Qualification					Final				
Athlete	Event	Speed Point	Boulder Point	Lead Point	Total	Rank	Speed Point	Boulder Point	Lead Point	Total	Rank
Sirapob Jirajaturapak	Men's	20	20	22	8800	20	did not advance				
Winai Ruangrit	Men's	16	17	12	3264	17	did not advance				
Pankaew Plypoolsup	Women's	14	12	14	2352	15	did not advance				
Puntarika Tunyavanich	Women's	15	8	13	1560	14	did not advance				

== Squash ==
Singles

Athlete	Event	Round of 32	Round of 16	Quarterfinals	Semifinals	Final	
Athlete	Event	Opposition Score	Opposition Score	Opposition Score	Opposition Score	Opposition Score	Rank
Natthakit Jivasuwan	Men's	M A Khan (PAK); L 0–3	did not advance				
Phuwis Poonsiri	Men's	R Tsukue (JPN); L 0–3	did not advance				
Anantana Prasertratanakul	Women's	Y S Rohmah (INA); L 1–3	did not advance				
Tuddaw Thamronglarp	Women's	J Chan (HKG); L 0–3	did not advance				

Team

Athlete	Event	Group Stage						Semifinal	Final	
Athlete	Event	Opposition Score	Opposition Score	Opposition Score	Opposition Score	Opposition Score	Rank	Opposition Score	Opposition Score	Rank
Phuwis Poonsiri; Arnold Phatraprasit; Natthakit Jivasuwan; Chattaporn Juntanayingyong	Men's	Qatar (QAT); L 0–3	Malaysia (MAS); L 0–3	Singapore (SGP); L 0–3	India (IND); L 0–3	Indonesia (INA); L 0–3	6	did not advance		
Anantana Prasertratanakul; Tuddaw Thamronglarp; Pranghatai Phongrattana; Suvipa Kitvijarn	Women's	China (CHN); L 0–3	India (IND); L 0–3	Iran (IRI); L 0–3	Hong Kong (HKG); L 1–2	Indonesia (INA); L 0–3	6	did not advance		

== Swimming ==
=== Men's ===
Event	Athlete	Heats		Final	
Event	Athlete	Time	Rank	Time	Rank
50 m freestyle	Andrew James Newling	23.48	22	did not advance	
100 m freestyle	Andrew James Newling	51.36	25	did not advance	
200 m freestyle	Andrew James Newling	1:54.17	20	did not advance	
50 m backstroke	Kasipat Chograthin	26.13	9	did not advance	
50 m backstroke	Navaphat Wongcharoen	27.37	25	did not advance	
100 m backstroke	Kasaipat Chograthin	58.55	18	did not advance	
50 m breaststroke	Radomyos Matjiur	29.62	24	did not advance	
100 m breaststroke	Radomyos Matjiur	1:04.11	20	did not advance	
100 m breaststroke	Nuttapong Ketin	1:04.55	22	did not advance	
200 m breaststroke	Nuttapong Ketin	2:18.17	15	did not advance	
50 m butterfly	Navaphat Wongcharoen	25.06	22	did not advance	
100 m butterfly	Navaphat Wongcharoen	54.91	18	did not advance	
200 m butterfly	Navaphat Wongcharoen	2:02.93	11	did not advance	
200 m individual medley	Nuttapong Ketin	2:09.08	15	did not advance	

=== Women's ===
Event	Athlete	Heats		Final	
Event	Athlete	Time	Rank	Time	Rank
50 m freestyle	Jenjira Srisa-ard	26.09	9	did not advance	
50 m freestyle	Manita Sathianchokwisan	26.35	14	did not advance	
100 m freestyle	Kornkarnjana Sapianchai	56.49	8 Q	56.85	8
100 m freestyle	Natthanan Junkrajang	57.87	14	did not advance	
200 m freestyle	Kornkarnjana Sapianchai	2:02.55	8 Q	2:01.96	7
200 m freestyle	Natthanan Junkrajang	2:02.49	6 Q	2:01.67	5
400 m freestyle	Ammiga Himathongkom	4:23.76	9	did not advance	
50 m backstroke	Saovanee Boonamphai	30.08	13	did not advance	
50 m backstroke	Araya Wongvat	30.82	16	did not advance	
100 m backstroke	Araya Wongvat	1:05.68	15	did not advance	
50 m breaststroke	Jenjira Srisa-ard	32.62	13	did not advance	
100 m breaststroke	Saovanee Boonamphai	1:12:77	14	did not advance	
50 m butterfly	Jenjira Srisa-ard	27.54	12	did not advance	
50 m butterfly	Kornkarnjana Sapianchai	27.70	13	did not advance	
100 m butterfly	Kornkarnjana Sapianchai	1:01.74	14	did not advance	
100 m butterfly	Jenjira Srisa-ard	1:02.98	17	did not advance	
4 × 100 m freestyle relay	Manita Sathianchokwisan; Kornkarnjana Sapianchai; Jenjira Srisa-ard; Natthanan Junkrajang	3:46.98	5 Q	3:45.93	5
4 × 200 m freestyle relay	Manita Sathianchokwisan; Ammiga Himathongkom; Araya Wongvat; Natthanan Junkrajang	8:52.10	7 Q	did not advance	
4 × 100 m medley relay	Araya Wongvat; Saovanee Boonamphai; Kornkarnjana Sapianchai; Natthanan Junkrajang	4:21.61	7 Q	4:18.19	5

=== Mixed's ===
Event	Athlete	Heats		Final	
Event	Athlete	Time	Rank	Time	Rank
4 × 100 m medley relay	Kasaipat Chograthin; Saovanee Boonamphai; Nuttapong Ketin; Manita Sathianchoksiwan	4:05.88	8 Q	4:01.75	7

== Table tennis ==
=== Men's ===
Singles

Athlete	Event	Round of 64	Round of 32	Round of 16	Quarterfinals	Semifinals	Final / BM	
Athlete	Event	Opposition Result	Opposition Result	Opposition Result	Opposition Result	Opposition Result	Opposition Result	Rank
Supanut Wisutmaythangkoon	Singles	Ahmad Ali (YEM); W 4–0	Ueda (JPN); L 1–4	did not advance				
Padasak Tanviriyavechakul	Singles	Vongdalasinh (LAO); W 4–0	Chen C-a (TPE); L 1–4	did not advance				

Team

Athlete	Event	Preliminary Round					Quarterfinal	Semifinal	Final	
Athlete	Event	Opposition Score	Opposition Score	Opposition Score	Opposition Score	Rank	Opposition Score	Opposition Score	Opposition Score	Rank
Komgrit Sangpao; Pattaratorn Passara; Supanut Wisutmaythangkoon; Padasak Tanviriyavechakul; Sirawit Puangthip	Team	Kyrgyzstan (KGZ); W 3–0	Japan (JPN); L 0–3	Maldives (MDV); W 3–0	Iran (IRI); L 1–3	3	did not advance			

=== Women's ===
Singles

Athlete	Event	Round of 64	Round of 32	Round of 16	Quarterfinals	Semifinals	Final / BM	
Athlete	Event	Opposition Result	Opposition Result	Opposition Result	Opposition Result	Opposition Result	Opposition Result	Rank
Suthasini Sawettabut	Singles	Bye	Chong W-i (MAC); W 4–1	Lee H-c (HKG); L 0–4	did not advance			
Nanthana Komwong	Singles	Bye	Batra (IND); L 0–4	did not advance				

Team

Athlete	Event	Preliminary Round				Quarterfinal	Semifinal	Final	
Athlete	Event	Opposition Score	Opposition Score	Opposition Score	Rank	Opposition Score	Opposition Score	Opposition Score	Rank
Tamolwan Khetkhuan; Jinnipa Sawettabut; Suthasini Sawettabut; Orawan Paranang; Nanthana Komwong	Team	Japan (JPN); L 0–3	Mongolia (MGL); W 3–0	North Korea (PRK); L 1–3	3	did not advance			

=== Mixed's ===
Athlete	Event	Round of 64	Round of 32	Round of 16	Quarterfinals	Semifinals	Final / BM	
Athlete	Event	Opposition Result	Opposition Result	Opposition Result	Opposition Result	Opposition Result	Opposition Result	Rank
Padasak Tanviriyavechakul; Suthasini Sawettabut	Doubles	Bye	Ranasingha / Madurangi (SRI); W 3–0	Chen C-a / Cheng I-c (TPE); L 1–3	did not advance			
Supanut Wisutmaythangkoon; Orawan Paranang	Doubles	Bye	Wang CQ / Sun YS (CHN); L 0–3	did not advance				

== Taekwondo ==
=== Kyorugi ===
Athlete	Event	Round of 32	Round of 16	Quarterfinal	Semifinal	Final	
Athlete	Event	Opposition Score	Opposition Score	Opposition Score	Opposition Score	Opposition Score	Rank
Ramnarong Sawekwiharee	Men's −58 kg	Bye	Enkhboldyn Buyanshagai (MGL); W 24–3	Niyaz Pulatov (UZB); L 21–23	did not advance		
Tawin Hanprab	Men's −63 kg	Hamad Al-Mabrouk (KSA); L 21–29	did not advance				
Nutthawee Klompon	Men's −68 kg	Song Guodong (CHN); W 20–18	Yerassyl Kaiyrbek (KAZ); L 10–26	did not advance			
Nattapat Tantramart	Men's +80 kg	—N/a	Tenzin Lhendup (BHU); W 12–1	Ruslan Zhaparov (KAZ); L 15–30	did not advance		
Panipak Wongpattanakit	Women's −49 kg	Bye	Hung Yu-ting (TPE); W 26–1	Kang Bo-ra (KOR); W 27–8	Nahid Kiani (IRI); W 11–6	Madinabonu Mannopova (UZB); W 21–3	1st place, gold medalist(s)
Phannapa Harnsujin	Women's −53 kg	Dhaysi Oo Julius (MYA); W 39–0	Ha Min-ah (KOR); L 12–28	did not advance			
Vipawan Siripornpermsak	Women's −57 kg	Bye	Charos Kayumova (UZB); W 28–27	Lin Yi-ching (TPE); W 37–16	Lee Ah-reum (KOR); L 10–12	Did not advance	3rd place, bronze medalist(s)

=== Poomsae ===
Athlete	Event	Round of 16	Quarterfinal	Semifinal	Final	
Athlete	Event	Opposition Score	Opposition Score	Opposition Score	Opposition Score	Rank
Pongporn Suvittayarak	Men's individual	Nguyễn Thiên Phụng (VIE); W 8.14–7.98	Rodolfo Reyes (PHI); W 8.32–8.08	Kang Min-sung (KOR); L 8.49–8.70	Did not advance	3rd place, bronze medalist(s)
Pongporn Suvittayarak; Chaiyasit Kwanboon; Nay Khamwongsa	Men's team	Bye	China; L 8.36–8.48	did not advance		
Phenkanya Phaisankiattikun	Women's individual	Ji Yuhan (CHN); L 7.95–7.99	did not advance			
Kotchawan Chomchuen; Phenkanya Phaisankiattikun; Ornawee Srisahakit	Women's team	India; W 8.27–7.38	Macau; W 8.24–7.45	Chinese Taipei; W 7.95–7.65	South Korea; W 8.21–8.20	1st place, gold medalist(s)

== Tennis ==
Men

Athlete	Event	Round of 64	Round of 32	Round of 16	Quarterfinals	Semifinals	Final	
Athlete	Event	Opposition Score	Opposition Score	Opposition Score	Opposition Score	Opposition Score	Opposition Score	Rank
Wishaya Trongcharoenchaikul	Singles	Bye	D Erdenebayar (MGL); W 6–4, 6–1	J Jung (TPE); L 4–6, 3–6	did not advance			
Palaphoom Kovapitukted	Singles	MS Zayid (QAT); W 6–3, 6–4	A Bublik (KAZ); L 3–6, 2–6	did not advance				
Sanchai Ratiwatana; Sonchat Ratiwatana	Doubles	Bye	S-c Hong / J-m Lee (KOR); L 6–7^{(4–7)}, 4–6	did not advance				
Nuttanon Kadchapanan; Wishaya Trongcharoenchaikul	Doubles	Bye	N Fernandes Gusmão / F Soares Sarmento (TLS); W 6–0, 6–2	R Bopanna / D Sharan (IND); L 3–6, 1–6	did not advance			

Women

Athlete	Event	Round of 64	Round of 32	Round of 16	Quarterfinals	Semifinals	Final	
Athlete	Event	Opposition Score	Opposition Score	Opposition Score	Opposition Score	Opposition Score	Opposition Score	Rank
Luksika Kumkhum	Singles	Bye	E Chong (HKG); L 6–4, 6–7^{(6–8)}, 6–7^{(1–7)}	did not advance				
Peangtarn Plipuech	Singles	Bye	A Sutjiadi (INA); L 6–3, 4–6, 4–6	did not advance				
Nicha Lertpitaksinchai; Peangtarn Plipuech	Doubles	Bye	Bhosale / Yadlapalli (IND); W 3–6, 6–4, [11–9]	J Budiman / D Nur Haliza (INA); W 6–0, 6–0	Y Xu / Z Yang (CHN); L 3–6, 6–1, [7–10]	did not advance		
Thasaporn Naklo; Mananchaya Sawangkaew	Doubles	Bye	Altansarnai / Erdenebileg (MGL); W 6–1, 6–2	H-c Chan / L Chan (TPE); L 3–6, 1–6	did not advance			

Mixed

Athlete	Event	Round of 32	Round of 16	Quarterfinals	Semifinals	Final	
Athlete	Event	Opposition Score	Opposition Score	Opposition Score	Opposition Score	Opposition Score	Rank
Luksika Kumkhum; Sonchat Ratiwatana	Doubles	Suhail / Abid (PAK); W 6–2, 6–0	Amanmuradova / Fayziev (UZB); W 6–2, 6–2	Zhang / Yeung (HKG); W 7–5, 6–3	Danilina / Nedovyesov (KAZ); W 4–6, 6–4, [12–10]	Sutjiadi / Rungkat (INA); L 4–6, 7–5, [7–10]	2nd place, silver medalist(s)
Nicha Lertpitaksinchai; Sanchai Ratiwatana	Doubles	Lehnert / Alcantara (PHI); W 6–0, 6–2	Sutjiadi / Rungkat (INA); L 5–7, 1–6	did not advance			

== Volleyball ==
=== Beach ===
Athlete	Event	Preliminary round	Standing	Round of 16	Quarterfinals	Semifinals	Final / BM	
Athlete	Event	Opposition Score	Standing	Opposition Score	Opposition Score	Opposition Score	Opposition Score	Rank
Nuttanon Inkiew; Sedtawat Padsawud	Men's	Pool D Ahmed – Adam (MDV); W 2 – 0 (21–7, 21–15); Al Jalbubi – Al Hashmi (OMA); L 0 – 2 (19–21, 11–21); Chui – Yeung (HKG); W 2 – 0 (21–14, 21–12)	2 Q	Mirzaali – Raoufi (IRI); L 0 – 2 (18–21, 16–21)	did not advance			
Surin Jongklang; Adisorn Khaolumtarn	Men's	Pool F Abdelrasoul – Sammoud (QAT); W 2 – 0 (21–17, 21–16); Vakili – Salemiinjehboroun (IRI); L 0 – 2 (17–21, 18–21); Ismail – Waahid (MDV); W 2 – 0 (21–16, 21–14)	2 Q	Rachmawan – Ashfiya (INA); L 0 – 2 (17–21, 18–21)	did not advance			
Varapatsorn Radarong; Tanarattha Udomchavee	Women's	Pool D Mashkova – Tsimbalova (KAZ); L 1 – 2 (21–18, 12–21, 11–15); Wong – Ng (HKG); W 2 – 0 (21–9, 21–10); Nguyen – Huynh (VIE); W 2 – 0 (21–10, 21–15); Juliana – Utami (INA); W 2 – 1 (14–21, 23–21, 29–27)	2 Q	Hongpak – Numwong (THA); W 2 – 0 (21–9, 21–0)	Ishii – Murakami (JPN); L 0 – 2 (18–21, 7–21)	did not advance		
Khanittha Hongpak; Rumpaipruet Numwong	Women's	Pool C Caminha – Alin De Souza (MGL); W 2 – 0 (21–5, 21–7); Futami – Hasegawa (JPN); L 0 – 2 (22–24, 17–21); Rachenko – Yeropkina (KAZ); W 2 – 1 (17–21, 21–7, 15–10); Ratnasari – Eka (INA); L 1 – 2 (21–17, 16–21, 11–15)	3 Q	Radarong – Udomchavee (THA); L 0 – 2 (9–21, 0–21)	did not advance			

=== Indoor ===
Summary

Team	Event	Group Stage					Playoffs	Quarterfinal / Pl.	Semifinal / Pl.	Final / BM / Pl.	
Team	Event	Opposition Score	Opposition Score	Opposition Score	Opposition Score	Rank	Opposition Score	Opposition Score	Opposition Score	Opposition Score	Rank
Thailand men's	Men's tournament	—N/a	Sri Lanka; W 3–1	China; L 2–3	Vietnam; W 3–1	1 Q	Indonesia; L 2–3	Myanmar; W 3–1	Saudi Arabia; W 3–0	Pakistan; W 3–1	7
Thailand women's	Women's tournament	Philippines; W 3–0	Japan; W 3–0	Hong Kong; W 3–0	Indonesia; W 3–1	1 Q	—N/a	Vietnam; W 3–0	South Korea; W 3–1	China; L 0–3	2nd place, silver medalist(s)

==== Men's tournament ====
Team roster

The following is the Thai roster in the men's volleyball tournament of the 2018 Asian Games.

Head coach: Monchai Supajirakul

No.	Name	Date of birth	Height	Weight	Spike	Block	Club
1	Jirayu Raksakaew	3 August 1987	1.94 m (6 ft 4 in)	82 kg (181 lb)	345 cm (11 ft 4 in)	330 cm (10 ft 10 in)	(Thailand) Visakha
2	Amorntep Konhan	6 October 1995	1.86 m (6 ft 1 in)	73 kg (161 lb)	300 cm (9 ft 10 in)	295 cm (9 ft 8 in)	(Thailand) Diamond Phitsanulok
3	Jakkapong Tongklang	1 August 1995	1.73 m (5 ft 8 in)	73 kg (161 lb)	300 cm (9 ft 10 in)	295 cm (9 ft 8 in)	(Thailand) Visakha
4	Jakkraphop Saengsee	16 January 1995	1.90 m (6 ft 3 in)	85 kg (187 lb)	340 cm (11 ft 2 in)	305 cm (10 ft 0 in)	(Thailand) Air Force
5	Kissada Nilsawai	17 April 1992	2.02 m (6 ft 8 in)	85 kg (187 lb)	350 cm (11 ft 6 in)	335 cm (11 ft 0 in)	(Thailand) Air Force
9	Kittikun Sriutthawong (c)	10 January 1986	1.92 m (6 ft 4 in)	74 kg (163 lb)	338 cm (11 ft 1 in)	306 cm (10 ft 0 in)	(Thailand) Visakha
10	Kitinon Namkhunthod	16 July 1992	1.88 m (6 ft 2 in)	73 kg (161 lb)	320 cm (10 ft 6 in)	311 cm (10 ft 2 in)	(Thailand) Diamond Phitsanulok
11	Chatmongkhon Paketkaew	4 May 1997	1.93 m (6 ft 4 in)	81 kg (179 lb)	325 cm (10 ft 8 in)	310 cm (10 ft 2 in)	(Thailand) Visakha
12	Anuchit Pakdeekaew	29 September 1996	1.92 m (6 ft 4 in)	90 kg (200 lb)	325 cm (10 ft 8 in)	315 cm (10 ft 4 in)	(Thailand) Air Force
13	Mawin Maneewong	5 October 1996	1.93 m (6 ft 4 in)	75 kg (165 lb)	325 cm (10 ft 8 in)	310 cm (10 ft 2 in)	(Thailand) Air Force
14	Kitsada Somkane	28 September 1990	1.90 m (6 ft 3 in)	77 kg (170 lb)	342 cm (11 ft 3 in)	312 cm (10 ft 3 in)	(Vietnam) Tràng An Ninh Bình
16	Kantapat Koonmee	17 April 1998	2.04 m (6 ft 8 in)	81 kg (179 lb)	345 cm (11 ft 4 in)	312 cm (10 ft 3 in)	(Thailand) Air Force
17	Saranchit Charoensuk	20 July 1987	1.81 m (5 ft 11 in)	75 kg (165 lb)	331 cm (10 ft 10 in)	301 cm (9 ft 11 in)	(Thailand) Nakhon Ratchasima
18	Montri Phuanglib	24 March 1990	1.67 m (5 ft 6 in)	70 kg (150 lb)	311 cm (10 ft 2 in)	281 cm (9 ft 3 in)	(Thailand) Diamond Phitsanulok

Group play

Pos	Team	Pld	W	L	Pts	SW	SL	SR	SPW	SPL	SPR	Qualification
1	Thailand	3	2	1	7	8	5	1.600	301	284	1.060	Classification for 1–12
2	China	3	2	1	6	8	6	1.333	313	301	1.040	Classification for 1–12
3	Sri Lanka	3	1	2	3	5	6	0.833	240	244	0.984	Classification for 13–20
4	Vietnam	3	1	2	2	4	8	0.500	260	285	0.912	Classification for 13–20

Source: OCA

Date	Time		Score		Set 1	Set 2	Set 3	Set 4	Set 5	Total	Report
20 Aug	12:30	Thailand	3–1	Sri Lanka	13–25	25–21	25–23	27–25		90–94	Report
22 Aug	16:30	China	3–2	Thailand	12–25	17–25	31–29	25–23	17–15	102–117	Report
24 Aug	19:00	Thailand	3–1	Vietnam	19–25	25–21	25–21	25–21		94–88	Report
26 Aug	16:30	Thailand	2–3	Indonesia	22–25	23–25	25–23	25–22	12–15	107–110	Report
28 Aug	10:00	Thailand	3–1	Myanmar	26–24	37–35	22–25	25–15		110–99	Report
30 Aug	10:00	Saudi Arabia	0–3	Thailand	23–25	25–27	22–25			70–77	Report
01 Sep	16:30	Thailand	3–1	Pakistan	20–25	25–23	28–26	25–21		98–95	Report

==== Women's tournament ====
Team roster

The following is the Thai roster in the women's volleyball tournament of the 2018 Asian Games.

Head coach: Danai Sriwatcharamethakul

No.	Name	Date of birth	Height	Weight	Spike	Block	Club
2	Piyanut Pannoy	10 November 1989	1.71 m (5 ft 7 in)	62 kg (137 lb)	280 cm (9 ft 2 in)	275 cm (9 ft 0 in)	(Kazakhstan) Altay
3	Pornpun Guedpard	5 May 1993	1.70 m (5 ft 7 in)	63 kg (139 lb)	288 cm (9 ft 5 in)	279 cm (9 ft 2 in)	(Thailand) Bangkok Glass
4	Thatdao Nuekjang	3 February 1994	1.84 m (6 ft 0 in)	72 kg (159 lb)	308 cm (10 ft 1 in)	296 cm (9 ft 9 in)	(Thailand) Khonkaen Star
5	Pleumjit Thinkaow (c)	9 November 1983	1.80 m (5 ft 11 in)	67 kg (148 lb)	303 cm (9 ft 11 in)	283 cm (9 ft 3 in)	(Thailand) Bangkok Glass
6	Onuma Sittirak	13 June 1986	1.75 m (5 ft 9 in)	72 kg (159 lb)	304 cm (10 ft 0 in)	285 cm (9 ft 4 in)	(Thailand) Nakhon Ratchasima
7	Hattaya Bamrungsuk	12 August 1993	1.80 m (5 ft 11 in)	71 kg (157 lb)	292 cm (9 ft 7 in)	282 cm (9 ft 3 in)	(Japan) JT Marvelous
10	Wilavan Apinyapong	6 June 1984	1.74 m (5 ft 9 in)	70 kg (150 lb)	294 cm (9 ft 8 in)	282 cm (9 ft 3 in)	(Thailand) Supreme Chonburi
13	Nootsara Tomkom	7 July 1985	1.69 m (5 ft 7 in)	57 kg (126 lb)	289 cm (9 ft 6 in)	278 cm (9 ft 1 in)	(Turkey) Fenerbahçe
14	Chitaporn Kamlangmak	17 March 1996	1.84 m (6 ft 0 in)	74 kg (163 lb)	290 cm (9 ft 6 in)	282 cm (9 ft 3 in)	(Thailand) Khonkaen Star
15	Malika Kanthong	8 January 1987	1.78 m (5 ft 10 in)	65 kg (143 lb)	292 cm (9 ft 7 in)	278 cm (9 ft 1 in)	(Thailand) Nakhon Ratchasima
16	Pimpichaya Kokram	16 June 1998	1.78 m (5 ft 10 in)	62 kg (137 lb)	293 cm (9 ft 7 in)	283 cm (9 ft 3 in)	(Thailand) Nonthaburi
18	Ajcharaporn Kongyot	18 June 1995	1.78 m (5 ft 10 in)	65 kg (143 lb)	298 cm (9 ft 9 in)	287 cm (9 ft 5 in)	(Thailand) Supreme Chonburi
19	Chatchu-on Moksri	6 November 1999	1.78 m (5 ft 10 in)	58 kg (128 lb)	298 cm (9 ft 9 in)	290 cm (9 ft 6 in)	(Japan) PFU BlueCats
20	Supattra Pairoj	27 June 1990	1.60 m (5 ft 3 in)	58 kg (128 lb)	275 cm (9 ft 0 in)	265 cm (8 ft 8 in)	(Thailand) Supreme Chonburi

Group play

Pos	Team	Pld	W	L	Pts	SW	SL	SR	SPW	SPL	SPR	Qualification
1	Thailand	4	4	0	12	12	1	12.000	322	221	1.457	Quarterfinals
2	Japan	4	3	1	9	9	3	3.000	290	197	1.472	Quarterfinals
3	Indonesia	4	2	2	6	7	8	0.875	315	328	0.960	Quarterfinals
4	Philippines	4	1	3	3	4	9	0.444	260	310	0.839	Quarterfinals
5	Hong Kong	4	0	4	0	1	12	0.083	190	321	0.592	Classification for 9–11

Source: OCA

Date	Time		Score		Set 1	Set 2	Set 3	Set 4	Set 5	Total	Report
19 Aug	12:30	Philippines	0–3	Thailand	22–25	12–25	15–25			49–75	Report
23 Aug	19:00	Thailand	3–0	Japan	25–20	27–25	25–20			77–65	Report
25 Aug	16:30	Thailand	3–0	Hong Kong	25–6	25–11	25–20			75–37	Report
27 Aug	16:30	Indonesia	1–3	Thailand	19–25	25–20	13–25	13–25		70–95	Report
29 Aug	10:30	Thailand	3–0	Vietnam	25–23	25–16	25–20			75–59	Report
31 Aug	17:00	Thailand	3–1	South Korea	25–15	25–20	20–25	25–22		95–82	Report
01 Sep	16:30	Thailand	0–3	China	19–25	17–25	13–25			49–75	Report

== Water polo ==
Summary

Key:
- FT – After full time.
- P – Match decided by penalty-shootout.

Team	Event	Group Stage					
Team	Event	Opposition Score	Opposition Score	Opposition Score	Opposition Score	Opposition Score	Rank
Thailand women's	Women's tournament	Hong Kong; W 19–6	Kazakhstan; L 4–13	Japan; L 5–19	China; L 5–17	Indonesia; W 20–7	4

=== Women's tournament ===
Team roster

The following is the Thai roster in the women's water polo tournament of the 2018 Asian Games.

No.	Name	Pos.	Height	Weight	Date of birth	2018 club
1	Rungravee Jangjai	GK	1.70 m (5 ft 7 in)	63 kg (139 lb)	27 March 2000	
2	Kaithip Saeteaw	CB	1.65 m (5 ft 5 in)	67 kg (148 lb)	29 November 2000	
3	Issaree Turon	CB	1.62 m (5 ft 4 in)	55 kg (121 lb)	17 February 2004	
4	Janista Thinwilai	D	1.69 m (5 ft 7 in)	59 kg (130 lb)	10 September 2002	
5	Thitirat Somyos	D	1.62 m (5 ft 4 in)	63 kg (139 lb)	6 February 2000	
6	Poonnada Rotchanarut	D	1.62 m (5 ft 4 in)	58 kg (128 lb)	20 August 2002	
7	Nirawan Chompoopuen	D	1.63 m (5 ft 4 in)	56 kg (123 lb)	17 April 2000	
8	Varistha Saraikarn (c)	D	1.62 m (5 ft 4 in)	55 kg (121 lb)	19 October 1994	
9	Rojnaree Taweechai	D	1.62 m (5 ft 4 in)	55 kg (121 lb)	27 June 2003	
10	Sarocha Rewrujirek	D	1.60 m (5 ft 3 in)	55 kg (121 lb)	6 April 1996	
11	Arisara Minsri	D	1.57 m (5 ft 2 in)	55 kg (121 lb)	17 March 2000	
12	Alwani Sathitanon	CB	1.62 m (5 ft 4 in)	75 kg (165 lb)	5 November 1998	
13	Khemasiri Sirivejjabandh	GK	1.66 m (5 ft 5 in)	54 kg (119 lb)	1 March 1997	

Round robin

Pos	Team	Pld	W	D	L	GF	GA	GD	Pts
1	China	5	5	0	0	76	24	+52	10
2	Kazakhstan	5	4	0	1	70	34	+36	8
3	Japan	5	3	0	2	84	36	+48	6
4	Thailand	5	2	0	3	53	62	−9	4
5	Indonesia	5	1	0	4	30	82	−52	2
6	Hong Kong	5	0	0	5	22	97	−75	0

Source: OCA

16 August; 15:50	Thailand	19–6	Hong Kong	Gelora Bung Karno Aquatic Stadium, Jakarta; Referees: Flahive (AUS), Ni (CHN)
16 August; 15:50	Score by quarters: 5–1, 3–3, 8–0, 3–2			Gelora Bung Karno Aquatic Stadium, Jakarta; Referees: Flahive (AUS), Ni (CHN)
16 August; 15:50	Saraikarn 5	Goals	Mak 3	Gelora Bung Karno Aquatic Stadium, Jakarta; Referees: Flahive (AUS), Ni (CHN)

17 August; 15:50	Kazakhstan	13–4	Thailand	Gelora Bung Karno Aquatic Stadium, Jakarta; Referees: Tan (SGP), Štampalija (CRO)
17 August; 15:50	Score by quarters: 3–3, 2–1, 6–0, 2–0			Gelora Bung Karno Aquatic Stadium, Jakarta; Referees: Tan (SGP), Štampalija (CRO)
17 August; 15:50	Mirshina 5	Goals	four players 1	Gelora Bung Karno Aquatic Stadium, Jakarta; Referees: Tan (SGP), Štampalija (CRO)

19 August; 17:10	Thailand	5–19	Japan	Gelora Bung Karno Aquatic Stadium, Jakarta; Referees: Han (KOR), Ni (CHN)
19 August; 17:10	Score by quarters: 2–7, 0–2, 0–6, 3–4			Gelora Bung Karno Aquatic Stadium, Jakarta; Referees: Han (KOR), Ni (CHN)
19 August; 17:10	Sathitanon 2	Goals	Arima, Inaba 5	Gelora Bung Karno Aquatic Stadium, Jakarta; Referees: Han (KOR), Ni (CHN)

20 August; 17:10	China	17–5	Thailand	Gelora Bung Karno Aquatic Stadium, Jakarta; Referees: Tan (SGP), Pranolo (INA)
20 August; 17:10	Score by quarters: 3–0, 5–2, 6–1, 3–2			Gelora Bung Karno Aquatic Stadium, Jakarta; Referees: Tan (SGP), Pranolo (INA)
20 August; 17:10	Chen X. 5	Goals	Rewrujirek 2	Gelora Bung Karno Aquatic Stadium, Jakarta; Referees: Tan (SGP), Pranolo (INA)

21 August; 14:30	Thailand	20–7	Indonesia	Gelora Bung Karno Aquatic Stadium, Jakarta; Referees: Ni (CHN), Flahive (AUS)
21 August; 14:30	Score by quarters: 5–1, 3–1, 8–2, 4–3			Gelora Bung Karno Aquatic Stadium, Jakarta; Referees: Ni (CHN), Flahive (AUS)
21 August; 14:30	Thinwilai 7	Goals	Balkis 2	Gelora Bung Karno Aquatic Stadium, Jakarta; Referees: Ni (CHN), Flahive (AUS)

== Weightlifting ==
=== Men's ===
Athlete	Event	Snatch		Clean & Jerk		Total	Rank
Athlete	Event	Result	Rank	Result	Rank	Total	Rank
Sinphet Kruaithong	−56 kg	119	5	146	5	265	5
Patiphan Bupphamala	−62 kg	120	11	140	11	260	11
Tairat Bunsuk	−69 kg	145	4	182	4	327	5
Witsanu Chantri	−69 kg	135	12	178	6	313	9
Chatuphum Chinnawong	−77 kg	154	3	187	2	341	3rd place, bronze medalist(s)
Pornchai Lobsi	−77 kg	146	5	171	10	317	7
Banyat Tawnok	−85 kg	151	7	170	8	321	8
Sarat Sumpradit	−94 kg	170	3	210	3	380	3rd place, bronze medalist(s)

=== Women's ===
Athlete	Event	Snatch		Clean & Jerk		Total	Rank
Athlete	Event	Result	Rank	Result	Rank	Total	Rank
Thunya Sukcharoen	−48 kg	87	3	102	3	189	3rd place, bronze medalist(s)
Sopita Tanasan	−53 kg	90	3	109	5	199	5
Surodchana Khambao	−53 kg	86	6	115	1	201	3rd place, bronze medalist(s)
Sukanya Srisurat	−58 kg	103	2	123	3	226	2nd place, silver medalist(s)
Rattanawan Wamalun	−63 kg	102	3	123	3	225	3rd place, bronze medalist(s)
Chitchanok Pulsabsakul	+75 kg	121	4	147	5	268	5
Duangaksorn Chaidee	+75 kg	121	4	159	3	280	3rd place, bronze medalist(s)

== Wrestling ==
=== Men's freestyle ===
Athlete	Event	Qualification	Round of 16	Quarterfinal	Semifinal	Repechage 1	Repechage 2	Final / BM	
Athlete	Event	Opposition Result	Opposition Result	Opposition Result	Opposition Result	Opposition Result	Opposition Result	Opposition Result	Rank
Somsak Jindapan	−65 kg	Bye	Abdulqosim Fayziev (TJK); L 2–12	did not advance					16
Chanwit Aunjai	−74 kg	Bye	Cấn Tất Dự (VIE); L 0–6^{F}	did not advance					17
Chiranuwat Chamnanjan	−86 kg	Bye	Domenic Abounader (LBN); L 0–4^{F}	did not advance					19

=== Men's Greco-Roman ===
Athlete	Event	Qualification	Round of 16	Quarterfinal	Semifinal	Repechage 1	Repechage 2	Final / BM	
Athlete	Event	Opposition Result	Opposition Result	Opposition Result	Opposition Result	Opposition Result	Opposition Result	Opposition Result	Rank
Piyabut Wiratul	−60 kg	Gyanender Dahiya (IND); L 2–10	did not advance						10
Pongsit Deemark	−67 kg	Ryu Han-su (KOR); L 0–8	did not advance						16
Apichai Natal	−77 kg	Mohammad Ali Geraei (IRI); L 0–8	did not advance						14
Peerapol Sirithong	−87 kg	Bye	Mohammed Al-Quhali (YEM); L 3–3	did not advance					9

=== Women's freestyle ===
Athlete	Event	Qualification	Round of 16	Quarterfinal	Semifinal	Repechage 1	Repechage 2	Final / BM	
Athlete	Event	Opposition Result	Opposition Result	Opposition Result	Opposition Result	Opposition Result	Opposition Result	Opposition Result	Rank
Manlika Esati	−50 kg	—N/a	Erdenesükhiin Narangerel (MGL); L 2–10^{F}	did not advance					10
Jantima Virangsa	−53 kg	—N/a	Chey Chan Raksmey (CAM); W 7–4	Zhuldyz Eshimova (KAZ); L 0–10	Did not advance	Lee Shin-hye (KOR); L 0–8	did not advance		8
Orasa Sookdongyor	−57 kg	—N/a	Pooja Dhanda (IND); L 0–10	did not advance					12
Salinee Srisombat	−62 kg	—N/a	Sakshi Malik (IND); L 0–10	did not advance					9
Nattakarn Kaewkhuanchum	−68 kg	—N/a	Meerim Zhumanazarova (KGZ); L 0–4^{F}	did not advance					11

== Wushu ==
=== Men's taolu ===
Athlete	Event	Score		Total	
Athlete	Event	Result	Result	Result	Rank
Jo Saelee	Taijiquan and Taijijian All-Round	9.00	9.17	18.17	14
Pitaya Yangrungrawin	Nanquan and Nangun All-Round	9.42	9.66	19.08	12
Bancha Saetho	Nanquan and Nangun All-Round	8.34	9.13	17.47	18
Sujinda Yangrungrawin	Daoshu and Gunshu All-Round	9.43	9.56	18.99	7

=== Men’s sanda ===
Athlete	Event	Round of 32	Round of 16	Quarterfinals	Semifinals	Final	
Athlete	Event	Opposition Result	Opposition Result	Opposition Result	Opposition Result	Opposition Result	Rank
Phitak Paokrathok	–56 kg	—N/a	Chien H-y (TPE); W 2 – 1	Kumar (IND); L 1 – 2	did not advance		
Wachara Sunthorn	–60 kg	Ahangarian (IRI); L 0 – 0	did not advance				
Charuwat Khunphet	–65 kg	—N/a	Park S-m (KOR); L 0 – 2	did not advance			

=== Women’s sanda ===
Athlete	Event	Round of 16	Quarterfinals	Semifinals	Final	
Athlete	Event	Opposition Result	Opposition Result	Opposition Result	Opposition Result	Rank
Siriluk Kaewcha	–52 kg	Kim W-j (KOR); W 2 – 0	Li YY (CHN); L 0 – 1	did not advance		
Suchaya Bualuang	–60 kg	—N/a	Shrestha (SRI); W 0 – 0	Mansouriyan (IRI); L 0 – 0	Did not advance	3rd place, bronze medalist(s)
