= Ski orienteering at the 2011 Asian Winter Games =

- Venue: Biathlon and Cross-Country Ski Complex
- Dates: 31 January – 5 February 2011
- Competitors: 32 from 6 nations

Ski orienteering at the 2011 Asian Winter Games was held at Biathlon and Cross-Country Ski Complex in Almaty, Kazakhstan. The eight events were scheduled for January 31– February 5, 2011.

== Schedule ==
| F | Final |

| Event↓/Date → | 31st Mon | 1st Tue | 2nd Wed | 3rd Thu | 4th Fri | 5th Sat |
|---|---|---|---|---|---|---|
| Men's sprint | F | | | | | |
| Men's middle distance | | | F | | | |
| Men's long distance | | | | F | | |
| Men's relay | | | | | | F |
| Women's sprint | F | | | | | |
| Women's middle distance | | | F | | | |
| Women's long distance | | | | F | | |
| Women's relay | | | | | | F |

== Medalists ==
=== Men ===
| Event | Gold | Silver | Bronze |
|---|---|---|---|
| Sprint | Mikhail Sorokin; Kazakhstan | Alexandr Babenko; Kazakhstan | Bayaraagiin Gerelt-Od; Mongolia |
| Middle distance | Mikhail Sorokin; Kazakhstan | Vitaliy Lilichenko; Kazakhstan | Bijan Kangarloo; Iran |
| Long distance | Mikhail Sorokin; Kazakhstan | Alexey Nemtsev; Kazakhstan | Bayaraagiin Gerelt-Od; Mongolia |
| Relay | Kazakhstan; Alexandr Babenko; Aslan Tokbayev; Mikhail Sorokin | Iran; Bijan Kangarloo; Yasin Shemshaki; Sattar Seid | Mongolia; Bayaraagiin Gerelt-Od; Boldyn Byambadorj; Erdenechimegiin Barkhüü |

=== Women ===
| Event | Gold | Silver | Bronze |
|---|---|---|---|
| Sprint | Olga Novikova; Kazakhstan | Liu Xiaoting; China | Yevgeniya Kuzmina; Kazakhstan |
| Middle distance | Olga Novikova; Kazakhstan | Yevgeniya Kuzmina; Kazakhstan | Liu Xiaoting; China |
| Long distance | Olga Novikova; Kazakhstan | Yevgeniya Kuzmina; Kazakhstan | Kim Ja-youn; South Korea |
| Relay | Kazakhstan; Yevgeniya Kuzmina; Elmira Moldasheva; Olga Novikova | South Korea; Kim Ja-youn; Lee Ha-na; Choi Seel-bi | Mongolia; Nandintsetsegiin Uugantsetseg; Altantsetsegiin Narantsetseg; Chinbatyn Otgontsetseg |

== Medal table ==
| Rank | Nation | Gold | Silver | Bronze | Total |
|---|---|---|---|---|---|
| 1 | Kazakhstan (KAZ) | 8 | 5 | 1 | 14 |
| 2 | China (CHN) | 0 | 1 | 1 | 2 |
| 2 | Iran (IRI) | 0 | 1 | 1 | 2 |
| 2 | South Korea (KOR) | 0 | 1 | 1 | 2 |
| 5 | Mongolia (MGL) | 0 | 0 | 4 | 4 |
| Totals (5 entries) | | 8 | 8 | 8 | 24 |

== Participating nations ==
A total of 32 athletes from 6 nations competed in ski orienteering at the 2011 Asian Winter Games:

- China (2)
- Iran (4)
- Kazakhstan (8)
- Kyrgyzstan (6)
- Mongolia (6)
- South Korea (6)
