= List of Asian Games medalists in ski orienteering =

This is the complete list of Asian Winter Games medalists in ski-orienteering in 2011.

== Men ==
=== Sprint ===
Games	Gold	Silver	Bronze
2011 Astana–Almaty	Mikhail Sorokin (KAZ)	Alexandr Babenko (KAZ)	Bayaraagiin Gerelt-Od (MGL)

=== Middle distance ===
Games	Gold	Silver	Bronze
2011 Astana–Almaty	Mikhail Sorokin (KAZ)	Vitaliy Lilichenko (KAZ)	Bijan Kangarloo (IRI)

=== Long distance ===
Games	Gold	Silver	Bronze
2011 Astana–Almaty	Mikhail Sorokin (KAZ)	Alexey Nemtsev (KAZ)	Bayaraagiin Gerelt-Od (MGL)

=== Relay ===
Games	Gold	Silver	Bronze
2011 Astana–Almaty	Kazakhstan (KAZ); Alexandr Babenko; Aslan Tokbayev; Mikhail Sorokin	Iran (IRI); Bijan Kangarloo; Yasin Shemshaki; Sattar Seid	Mongolia (MGL); Bayaraagiin Gerelt-Od; Boldyn Byambadorj; Erdenechimegiin Barkhüü

== Women ==
=== Sprint ===
Games	Gold	Silver	Bronze
2011 Astana–Almaty	Olga Novikova (KAZ)	Liu Xiaoting (CHN)	Yevgeniya Kuzmina (KAZ)

=== Middle distance ===
Games	Gold	Silver	Bronze
2011 Astana–Almaty	Olga Novikova (KAZ)	Yevgeniya Kuzmina (KAZ)	Liu Xiaoting (CHN)

=== Long distance ===
Games	Gold	Silver	Bronze
2011 Astana–Almaty	Olga Novikova (KAZ)	Yevgeniya Kuzmina (KAZ)	Kim Ja-youn (KOR)

=== Relay ===
Games	Gold	Silver	Bronze
2011 Astana–Almaty	Kazakhstan (KAZ); Yevgeniya Kuzmina; Elmira Moldasheva; Olga Novikova	South Korea (KOR); Kim Ja-youn; Lee Ha-na; Choi Seel-bi	Mongolia (MGL); Nandintsetsegiin Uugantsetseg; Altantsetsegiin Narantsetseg; Chinbatyn Otgontsetseg
