= Ski mountaineering at the 2025 Asian Winter Games =

- Venue: Yabuli Ski Resort
- Dates: 9–12 February 2025
- Competitors: 40 from 9 nations

Ski mountaineering competitions at the 2025 Asian Winter Games in Harbin, China, were held at the Yabuli Ski Resort between 9–12 February, 2025.

China dominated the competition by winning all 9 medals.

== Schedule ==
Q	Qualification	S	Semifinals	F	Final

Event↓/Date →	9th Sun			10th Mon	11th Tue	12th Wed	
Men's sprint	Q	S	F				
Women's sprint	Q	S	F				
Mixed relay						Q	F

== Medalists ==
Event	Gold	Silver	Bronze
Men's sprint	Bu Luer; China	Zhang Chenghao; China	Bi Yuxin; China
Women's sprint	Cidan Yuzhen; China	Yu Jingxuan; China	Suolang Quzhen; China
Mixed relay	China; Cidan Yuzhen; Bu Luer	China; Yu Jingxuan; Bi Yuxin	China; Suolang Quzhen; Liu Jianbin

== Medal table ==
Rank	Nation	Gold	Silver	Bronze	Total
1	China (CHN)	3	3	3	9
Totals (1 entries)		3	3	3	9

== Participating nations ==
A total of 40 athletes from 9 nations competed in ski mountaineering at the 2025 Asian Winter Games:

- China (8)
- Iran (4)
- Japan (6)
- Kazakhstan (5)
- Lebanon (1)
- Qatar (1)
- South Korea (6)
- Thailand (1)
- Uzbekistan (8)
