= Lists of Asian Games medalists =

This is a list of lists of Asian Games medalists.

== List ==
- List of Asian Games medalists for Indonesia
- List of Asian Games medalists in alpine skiing
- List of Asian Games medalists in archery
- List of Asian Games medalists in artistic swimming
- List of Asian Games medalists in athletics
- List of Asian Games medalists in badminton
- List of Asian Games medalists in bandy
- List of Asian Games medalists in baseball
- List of Asian Games medalists in basketball
- List of Asian Games medalists in beach volleyball
- List of Asian Games medalists in biathlon
- List of Asian Games medalists in bodybuilding
- List of Asian Games medalists in bowling
- List of Asian Games medalists in boxing
- List of Asian Games medalists in bridge
- List of Asian Games medalists in canoeing
- List of Asian Games medalists in chess
- List of Asian Games medalists in cricket
- List of Asian Games medalists in cross-country skiing
- List of Asian Games medalists in cue sports
- List of Asian Games medalists in curling
- List of Asian Games medalists in cycling
- List of Asian Games medalists in dancesport
- List of Asian Games medalists in diving
- List of Asian Games medalists in dragon boat
- List of Asian Games medalists in equestrian
- List of Asian Games medalists in esports
- List of Asian Games medalists in fencing
- List of Asian Games medalists in field hockey
- List of Asian Games medalists in figure skating
- List of Asian Games medalists in football
- List of Asian Games medalists in freestyle skiing
- List of Asian Games medalists in go
- List of Asian Games medalists in golf
- List of Asian Games medalists in gymnastics
- List of Asian Games medalists in handball
- List of Asian Games medalists in ice hockey
- List of Asian Games medalists in jet ski
- List of Asian Games medalists in judo
- List of Asian Games medalists in ju-jitsu
- List of Asian Games medalists in kabaddi
- List of Asian Games medalists in karate
- List of Asian Games medalists in kurash
- List of Asian Games medalists in modern pentathlon
- List of Asian Games medalists in paragliding
- List of Asian Games medalists in pencak silat
- List of Asian Games medalists in roller sports
- List of Asian Games medalists in rowing
- List of Asian Games medalists in rugby union
- List of Asian Games medalists in sailing
- List of Asian Games medalists in sambo
- List of Asian Games medalists in sepak takraw
- List of Asian Games medalists in shooting
- List of Asian Games medalists in short-track speed skating
- List of Asian Games medalists in ski jumping
- List of Asian Games medalists in ski mountaineering
- List of Asian Games medalists in ski orienteering
- List of Asian Games medalists in snowboarding
- List of Asian Games medalists in soft tennis
- List of Asian Games medalists in speed skating
- List of Asian Games medalists in sport climbing
- List of Asian Games medalists in squash
- List of Asian Games medalists in swimming
- List of Asian Games medalists in table tennis
- List of Asian Games medalists in taekwondo
- List of Asian Games medalists in tennis
- List of Asian Games medalists in triathlon
- List of Asian Games medalists in volleyball
- List of Asian Games medalists in water polo
- List of Asian Games medalists in weightlifting
- List of Asian Games medalists in wrestling
- List of Asian Games medalists in wushu
- List of Asian Games medalists in xiangqi
