= List of Asian Games medalists in ski mountaineering =

This is the complete list of Asian Winter Games medalists in ski mountaineering in 2025.

== Events ==
=== Men's sprint ===
Games	Gold	Silver	Bronze
2025 Harbin	Bu Luer (CHN)	Zhang Chenghao (CHN)	Bi Yuxin (CHN)

=== Women's sprint ===
Games	Gold	Silver	Bronze
2025 Harbin	Cidan Yuzhen (CHN)	Yu Jingxuan (CHN)	Suolang Quzhen (CHN)

=== Mixed relay ===
Games	Gold	Silver	Bronze
2025 Harbin	China (CHN); Cidan Yuzhen; Bu Luer	China (CHN); Yu Jingxuan; Bi Yuxin	China (CHN); Suolang Quzhen; Liu Jianbin
