= Ski orienteering at the 2011 Asian Winter Games – Men's relay =

Men's relay at the 2011 Asian Winter Games
- Venue: Biathlon and Cross-Country Ski Complex
- Dates: 5 February 2011
- Competitors: 15 from 5 nations

Medalists
| gold medal | Kazakhstan; Alexandr Babenko, Aslan Tokbayev, Mikhail Sorokin |
| silver medal | Iran; Bijan Kangarloo, Yasin Shemshaki, Sattar Seid |
| bronze medal | Mongolia; Bayaraagiin Gerelt-Od, Boldyn Byambadorj, Erdenechimegiin Barkhüü |

The men's relay (3 × 3.55 kilometers) event at the 2011 Asian Winter Games was held on 5 February at the Almaty Biathlon and Cross-Country Ski Complex.

== Schedule ==
All times are Almaty Time (UTC+06:00)

| Date | Time | Event |
|---|---|---|
| Saturday, 5 February 2011 | 14:00 | Final |

== Results ==
| Rank | Team | Time |
|---|---|---|
| 1st place, gold medalist(s) | Kazakhstan (KAZ) | 56:15 |
| | Alexandr Babenko | 19:10 |
| | Aslan Tokbayev | 21:19 |
| | Mikhail Sorokin | 15:46 |
| 2nd place, silver medalist(s) | Iran (IRI) | 1:02:35 |
| | Bijan Kangarloo | 21:19 |
| | Yasin Shemshaki | 21:04 |
| | Sattar Seid | 20:12 |
| 3rd place, bronze medalist(s) | Mongolia (MGL) | 1:27:13 |
| | Bayaraagiin Gerelt-Od | 24:21 |
| | Boldyn Byambadorj | 37:10 |
| | Erdenechimegiin Barkhüü | 25:42 |
| 4 | Kyrgyzstan (KGZ) | 1:28:13 |
| | Igor Gusev | 29:00 |
| | Andrei Savinykh | 28:37 |
| | Tamerlan Dzhumabekov | 30:36 |
| 5 | South Korea (KOR) | 1:34:59 |
| | Son Youn-sun | 34:58 |
| | Jang Koang-min | 25:45 |
| | Hong Byung-sik | 34:16 |
