= Ski orienteering at the 2011 Asian Winter Games – Men's long distance =

Men's long distance at the 2011 Asian Winter Games
- Venue: Biathlon and Cross-Country Ski Complex
- Dates: 3 February 2011
- Competitors: 11 from 6 nations

Medalists
| gold medal | Mikhail Sorokin | Kazakhstan |
| silver medal | Alexey Nemtsev | Kazakhstan |
| bronze medal | Bayaraagiin Gerelt-Od | Mongolia |

The men's long distance (10.1 kilometers) event at the 2011 Asian Winter Games was held on 3 February at the Almaty Biathlon and Cross-Country Ski Complex.

== Schedule ==
All times are Almaty Time (UTC+06:00)

| Date | Time | Event |
|---|---|---|
| Thursday, 3 February 2011 | 14:00 | Final |

== Results ==
Legend

- DNF — Did not finish

| Rank | Athlete | Time |
|---|---|---|
| 1st place, gold medalist(s) | Mikhail Sorokin (KAZ) | 58:06 |
| 2nd place, silver medalist(s) | Alexey Nemtsev (KAZ) | 1:06:10 |
| 3rd place, bronze medalist(s) | Bayaraagiin Gerelt-Od (MGL) | 1:16:56 |
| 4 | Dong Wenqiang (CHN) | 1:21:43 |
| 5 | Sattar Seid (IRI) | 1:47:05 |
| 6 | Jang Koang-min (KOR) | 1:48:11 |
| 7 | Yasin Shemshaki (IRI) | 1:49:32 |
| 8 | Boldyn Byambadorj (MGL) | 2:07:37 |
| — | Hong Byung-sik (KOR) | DNF |
| — | Andrei Savinykh (KGZ) | DNF |
| — | Tamerlan Dzhumabekov (KGZ) | DNF |
