= Ski orienteering at the 2011 Asian Winter Games – Men's middle distance =

Men's middle distance at the 2011 Asian Winter Games
- Venue: Biathlon and Cross-Country Ski Complex
- Dates: 2 February 2011
- Competitors: 11 from 6 nations

Medalists
gold medal	Mikhail Sorokin	Kazakhstan
silver medal	Vitaliy Lilichenko	Kazakhstan
bronze medal	Bijan Kangarloo	Iran

The men's middle distance (7.07 kilometers) event at the 2011 Asian Winter Games was held on 2 February at the Almaty Biathlon and Cross-Country Ski Complex.

== Schedule ==
All times are Almaty Time (UTC+06:00)

Date	Time	Event
Wednesday, 2 February 2011	10:00	Final

== Results ==
Rank	Athlete	Time
1st place, gold medalist(s)	Mikhail Sorokin (KAZ)	35:33
2nd place, silver medalist(s)	Vitaliy Lilichenko (KAZ)	42:28
3rd place, bronze medalist(s)	Bijan Kangarloo (IRI)	44:59
4	Yasin Shemshaki (IRI)	46:11
5	Dong Wenqiang (CHN)	47:10
6	Bayaraagiin Gerelt-Od (MGL)	51:46
7	Boldyn Byambadorj (MGL)	1:00:07
8	Jang Koang-min (KOR)	1:05:57
9	Hong Byung-sik (KOR)	1:11:12
10	Igor Gusev (KGZ)	1:17:09
11	Tamerlan Dzhumabekov (KGZ)	1:25:00
