= Cambodia at the Asian Games =

- IOC code: CAM
- NOC: National Olympic Committee of Cambodia
- Website: www.noccambodia.org (in Khmer and English)
- Medals Ranked 35th: Gold 3 Silver 2 Bronze 10 Total 15

Summer appearances
- 1954; 1958; 1962; 1966; 1970; 1974; 1978–1990; 1994; 1998; 2002; 2006; 2010; 2014; 2018; 2022; 2026

Cambodia first competed at the Asian Games in 1954. Cambodia missed the 1966 Asian Games in Bangkok due to the IOC suspended National Olympic Committee of Cambodia from 1965-1967 for the first time. They also missed the 1978 Asian Games in Bangkok, the 1982 Asian Games in New Delhi, the 1986 Asian Games in Seoul and the 1990 Asian Games in Beijing due to the IOC suspended National Olympic Committee of Cambodia from 1975-1989 for the second time. Cambodia has never participated at the Asian Winter Games.

== Summer Games Results ==
Games	Athletes	Gold	Silver	Bronze	Total	Rank
as Cambodia
(India) New Delhi 1951	Did not participate					
(Philippines) Manila 1954	12	0	0	0	0	−
(Japan) Tokyo 1958	12	0	0	0	0	-
(Indonesia) Jakarta 1962	74	0	0	1	1	13
(Thailand) Bangkok 1966	Did not participate					
as Khmer Republic
(Thailand) Bangkok 1970	8	0	2	3	5	15
(Iran) Tehran 1974	25	0	0	0	0	-
as Democratic Kampuchea
(Thailand) Bangkok 1978	Did not participate					
as People's Republic of Kampuchea
(India) New Delhi 1982	Did not participate					
(South Korea) Seoul 1986	Did not participate					
as (State of Cambodia (1989–1993)) State of Cambodia
(China) Beijing 1990	Did not participate					
as Cambodia
(Japan) Hiroshima 1994	18	0	0	0	0	-
(Thailand) Bangkok 1998	104	0	0	0	0	-
(South Korea) Busan 2002	17	0	0	0	0	-
(Qatar) Doha 2006	17	0	0	0	0	-
(China) Guangzhou 2010	20	0	0	0	0	-
(South Korea) Incheon 2014	20	1	0	0	1	28
(Indonesia) Jakarta−Palembang 2018	43	2	0	1	3	24
(China) Hangzhou 2022	133	0	0	1	1	38
(Japan) Aichi-Nagoya 2026	59	0	0	4	4	35
(Qatar) Doha 2030	Future event					
(Saudi Arabia) Riyadh 2034	Future event					
Total		3	2	10	15	35

=== Medals by Summer Sport ===
Leading in that sport

Sport	Gold	Silver	Bronze	Total
Jet ski	1	0	1	2
Ju-jitsu	1	0	0	1
Taekwondo	1	0	0	1
Boxing	0	2	1	3
Swimming	0	0	2	2
Karate	0	0	1	1
Totals (6 entries)	3	2	5	10

=== Medalist by sport ===
Medal	Name	Sport	Event	Host
Bronze	You Chin Hong	Boxing	Men's lightweight (60 kg)	(Indonesia) 1962 Jakarta
Silver	Khieu Soeun	Boxing	Men's light welterweight (63.5 kg)	(Thailand) 1970 Bangkok
Silver	Long Savoen	Boxing	Men's welterweight (67 kg)	(Thailand) 1970 Bangkok
Bronze	Phath Sim Onn	Boxing	Men's 100 m breaststroke	(Thailand) 1970 Bangkok
Gold	Sorn Seavmey	Taekwondo	Women's middleweight (−73kg)	(South Korea) 2014 Incheon
Gold	Jessa Khan	Jujitsu	Women's 49 kg	(Indonesia) 2018 Jakarta–Palembang
Gold	Saly Ou Moeut	Jet ski	Men's Ski modified	(Indonesia) 2018 Jakarta–Palembang
Bronze	Saly Ou Moeut	Jet ski	Men's Runabout 1100 stock	(Indonesia) 2018 Jakarta–Palembang
Bronze	Sreynuch Puthea; Sreyda Oun; Chhenghorng That	Karate	Women's team kata	(China) 2022 Hangzhou
