= Ski orienteering at the 2011 Asian Winter Games – Men's sprint =

Men's sprint at the 2011 Asian Winter Games
- Venue: Biathlon and Cross-Country Ski Complex
- Dates: 31 January 2011
- Competitors: 11 from 6 nations

Medalists
gold medal	Mikhail Sorokin	Kazakhstan
silver medal	Alexandr Babenko	Kazakhstan
bronze medal	Bayaraagiin Gerelt-Od	Mongolia

The men's sprint (3650 meters) event at the 2011 Asian Winter Games was held on 31 January at the Almaty Biathlon and Cross-Country Ski Complex.

== Schedule ==
All times are Almaty Time (UTC+06:00)

Date	Time	Event
Monday, 31 January 2011	10:00	Final

== Results ==
Legend

- DSQ — Disqualified

Rank	Athlete	Time
1st place, gold medalist(s)	Mikhail Sorokin (KAZ)	13:31.0
2nd place, silver medalist(s)	Alexandr Babenko (KAZ)	15:13.7
3rd place, bronze medalist(s)	Bayaraagiin Gerelt-Od (MGL)	20:16.1
4	Erdenechimegiin Barkhüü (MGL)	20:33.6
5	Dong Wenqiang (CHN)	20:55.5
6	Jang Koang-min (KOR)	26:36.9
7	Mostafa Mirhashemi (IRI)	26:47.5
8	Hong Byung-sik (KOR)	27:50.4
9	Andrei Savinykh (KGZ)	28:27.0
10	Igor Gusev (KGZ)	30:10.4
—	Sattar Seid (IRI)	DSQ
