= Ski orienteering at the 2011 Asian Winter Games – Women's long distance =

Women's long distance at the 2011 Asian Winter Games
- Venue: Biathlon and Cross-Country Ski Complex
- Dates: 3 February 2011
- Competitors: 9 from 5 nations

Medalists
gold medal	Olga Novikova	Kazakhstan
silver medal	Yevgeniya Kuzmina	Kazakhstan
bronze medal	Kim Ja-youn	South Korea

The women's long distance (7.4 kilometers) event at the 2011 Asian Winter Games was held on 3 February at the Almaty Biathlon and Cross-Country Ski Complex.

== Schedule ==
All times are Almaty Time (UTC+06:00)

Date	Time	Event
Thursday, 3 February 2011	14:00	Final

== Results ==
Legend

- DNF — Did not finish

Rank	Athlete	Time
1st place, gold medalist(s)	Olga Novikova (KAZ)	53:00
2nd place, silver medalist(s)	Yevgeniya Kuzmina (KAZ)	1:10:18
3rd place, bronze medalist(s)	Kim Ja-youn (KOR)	1:12:56
4	Liu Xiaoting (CHN)	1:27:16
5	Lee Ha-na (KOR)	1:33:26
6	Chinbatyn Otgontsetseg (MGL)	1:48:29
7	Nandintsetsegiin Uugantsetseg (MGL)	1:50:06
—	Elena Rybalova (KGZ)	DNF
—	Olga Gorozhanina (KGZ)	DNF
