= Jet ski at the 2018 Asian Games =

- Venue: Ancol Beach
- Dates: 23–26 August 2018
- Competitors: 33 from 9 nations

Jet ski or Jet skiing at the 2018 Asian Games was held at Ancol Beach, Jakarta, Indonesia, from 23 to 26 August 2018 and consisted of four events, all events are mixed.

There were three closed course events in the competition, runabout limited, runabout 1100 stock and ski modified plus one endurance event.

== Schedule ==
●	Moto	●	Last moto

Event↓/Date →	23rd Thu	24th Fri	25th Sat	26th Sun
Runabout limited	●●	●●		
Runabout 1100 stock	●●	●	●	
Runabout endurance open			●	●●
Ski modified	●	●●	●	

== Medalists ==
Event	Gold	Silver	Bronze
Runabout limited	Ali Al-Lanjawi; United Arab Emirates	Aero Sutan Aswar; Indonesia	Aqsa Sutan Aswar; Indonesia
Runabout 1100 stock	Attapon Kunsa; Thailand	Phadit Buree; Thailand	Saly Ou Moeut; Cambodia
Runabout endurance open	Aqsa Sutan Aswar; Indonesia	Ali Al-Lanjawi; United Arab Emirates	Suphathat Footrakul; Thailand
Ski modified	Saly Ou Moeut; Cambodia	Kasidit Teeraprateep; Thailand	Nuttakorn Pupakdee; Thailand

== Medal table ==
Rank	Nation	Gold	Silver	Bronze	Total
1	Thailand (THA)	1	2	2	5
2	Indonesia (INA)	1	1	1	3
3	United Arab Emirates (UAE)	1	1	0	2
4	Cambodia (CAM)	1	0	1	2
Totals (4 entries)		4	4	4	12

== Participating nations ==
A total of 33 athletes from 9 nations competed in jet ski at the 2018 Asian Games:

- Cambodia (2)
- China (2)
- Indonesia (3)
- Malaysia (2)
- Philippines (1)
- Saudi Arabia (3)
- South Korea (6)
- Thailand (8)
- United Arab Emirates (6)
