= List of Asian Games medalists in jet ski =

This is the complete list of Asian Games medalists in jet ski in 2018.

== Events ==
=== Runabout limited ===
Games	Gold	Silver	Bronze
2018 Jakarta–Palembang	Ali Al-Lanjawi (UAE)	Aero Sutan Aswar (INA)	Aqsa Sutan Aswar (INA)

=== Runabout 1100 stock ===
Games	Gold	Silver	Bronze
2018 Jakarta–Palembang	Attapon Kunsa (THA)	Phadit Buree (THA)	Saly Ou Moeut (CAM)

=== Runabout endurance open ===
Games	Gold	Silver	Bronze
2018 Jakarta–Palembang	Aqsa Sutan Aswar (INA)	Ali Al-Lanjawi (UAE)	Suphathat Footrakul (THA)

=== Ski modified ===
Games	Gold	Silver	Bronze
2018 Jakarta–Palembang	Saly Ou Moeut (CAM)	Kasidit Teeraprateep (THA)	Nuttakorn Pupakdee (THA)
