= Iran at the 2011 Asian Winter Games =

- IOC code: IRI
- NOC: National Olympic Committee of the Islamic Republic of Iran

in Astana and Almaty
- Competitors: 10 in 2 sports
- Flag bearer: Alidad Saveh-Shemshaki
- Medals Ranked 6th: Gold 0 Silver 1 Bronze 2 Total 3

Asian Winter Games appearances
- 1990; 1996; 1999; 2003; 2007; 2011; 2017; 2025; 2029

Iran participated in the 2011 Asian Winter Games in Almaty and Astana, Kazakhstan from January 30, 2011, to February 6, 2011.

== Competitors ==
Sport	Men	Women	Total
Alpine skiing	3	3	6
Cross-country skiing	3		3
Ski orienteering	4		4
Total	7	3	10

== Medal summary ==
=== Medals by sport ===
Sport	Gold	Silver	Bronze	Total
Alpine skiing			1	1
Ski orienteering		1	1	2
Total	0	1	2	3

=== Medalists ===
Medal	Name	Sport	Event
Silver	Bijan Kangarloo; Yasin Shemshaki; Sattar Seid	Ski orienteering	Men's relay
Bronze	Mohammad Kiadarbandsari	Alpine skiing	Men's super-G
Bronze	Bijan Kangarloo	Ski orienteering	Men's middle distance

== Results by event ==
=== Ski orienteering ===
Athlete	Event	Time	Rank
Mostafa Mirhashemi	Men's sprint	26:47.5	7
Sattar Seid	Men's sprint	Disqualified	—
Bijan Kangarloo	Men's middle distance	44:59	3rd place, bronze medalist(s)
Yasin Shemshaki	Men's middle distance	46:11	4
Sattar Seid	Men's long distance	1:47:05	5
Yasin Shemshaki	Men's long distance	1:49:32	7
Bijan Kangarloo; Yasin Shemshaki; Sattar Seid	Men's relay	1:02:35	2nd place, silver medalist(s)

=== Skiing ===
==== Alpine ====
Athlete	Event	Super-G		Slalom		Total	
Athlete	Event	Time	Rank	Time	Rank	Time	Rank
Mohammad Kiadarbandsari	Men's super-G	—N/a				1:07.52	3rd place, bronze medalist(s)
Hossein Saveh-Shemshaki	Men's super-G	—N/a				1:07.80	4
Mohammad Kiadarbandsari	Men's downhill	—N/a				1:30.94	5
Hossein Saveh-Shemshaki	Men's downhill	—N/a				1:30.40	4
Hossein Saveh-Shemshaki	Men's super combined	1:05.77	4	42.77	4	1:48.54	4
Pouria Saveh-Shemshaki	Men's super combined	1:05.97	5	42.96	5	1:48.93	5
Marjan Kalhor	Women's super-G	—N/a				1:16.41	5
Mitra Kalhor	Women's super-G	—N/a				1:20.94	7
Marjan Kalhor	Women's downhill	—N/a				1:46.64	6
Ziba Kalhor	Women's downhill	—N/a				1:48.17	7
Marjan Kalhor	Women's super combined	1:13.52	6	51.86	4	2:05.38	4
Ziba Kalhor	Women's super combined	1:13.81	7	52.40	5	2:06.21	5

==== Cross-country ====
Athlete	Event	Qualification		Semifinal		Final	Rank
Athlete	Event	Time	Rank	Time	Rank	Time	Rank
Bijan Kangarloo	Men's sprint classical	4:35.32	7 Q	4:33.2	3	Did not advance	6
Yasin Shemshaki	Men's sprint classical	5:00.54	8 Q	5:06.6	4	Did not advance	8
Sattar Seid; Bijan Kangarloo	Men's team sprint freestyle	—N/a				25:30.2	4
