= Olga Novikova (orienteer) =

Kazakhstani ski-orienteering competitor

Medal record

Women's Ski-orienteering

Representing Russia

World Championships
Silver medal – second place	2007 Moscow Region	Sprint

Junior World Championships
Gold medal – first place	2004 Vuokatti	Short
Silver medal – second place	2004 Vuokatti	Long
Silver medal – second place	2005 S-chanf	Long
Silver medal – second place	2005 S-chanf	Middle

Representing Kazakhstan

World Cup
Bronze medal – third place	2010	Overall WC

Asian Games
Gold medal – first place	2011 Astana-Almaty	Sprint
Gold medal – first place	2011 Astana-Almaty	Middle
Gold medal – first place	2011 Astana-Almaty	Long
Gold medal – first place	2011 Astana-Almaty	Relay

World Military Games
Bronze medal – third place	2017 Sochi	Relay
Silver medal – second place	2017 Sochi	Team sprint

Olga Novikova is a Kazakhstani ski-orienteering competitor. She was born in Kazakhstan, and later moved to Russia. She is Junior World Champion from 2004. She won a silver medal at the World Ski Orienteering Championships in 2007, competing for Russia. Competing for Kazakhstan, she placed third overall in the World Cup in 2010, and won four gold medals at the 2011 Asian Winter Games.

== Career ==
Novikova won a gold medal in the short distance at the 2004 Junior World Ski Orienteering Championships in Vuokatti, and also a silver medal in the long distance. At the 2004 Junior World Championships in S-chanf she won silver medals in both the long and the middle distance.

At the World Ski Orienteering Championships in Russia in 2007 she placed 8th in the middle distance, and won a silver medal in the sprint.

She competed for Kazakhstan during the 2010 World Cup in Ski Orienteering, and placed third overall behind winner Natalya Tomilova and Marte Reenaas.

She also competes internationally in foot orienteering, and participated at the 2010 World Orienteering Championships in Trondheim, where she placed 30th in the middle distance.

Competing for Kazakhstan at the 2011 Asian Winter Games in Astana/Almaty, she won four gold medals in ski orienteering out of four possible. She won the sprint ahead of Liu Xiaoting and Yevgeniya Kuzmina. She won the middle distance ahead of Kuzmina and Liu, and the long distance ahead of Kuzmina and Kim Ja-Youn. She was also part of the Kazakhstani relay team, along with Kuzmina and Elmira Moldasheva, and won gold medals ahead of the team from South Korea.
