= Ski orienteering at the 2011 Asian Winter Games – Women's middle distance =

Women's middle distance at the 2011 Asian Winter Games
- Venue: Biathlon and Cross-Country Ski Complex
- Dates: 2 February 2011
- Competitors: 9 from 5 nations

Medalists
gold medal	Olga Novikova	Kazakhstan
silver medal	Yevgeniya Kuzmina	Kazakhstan
bronze medal	Liu Xiaoting	China

The women's middle distance (7.4 kilometers) event at the 2011 Asian Winter Games was held on 2 February at the Almaty Biathlon and Cross-Country Ski Complex.

== Schedule ==
All times are Almaty Time (UTC+06:00)

Date	Time	Event
Wednesday, 2 February 2011	14:00	Final

== Results ==
Legend

- DSQ — Disqualified

Rank	Athlete	Time
1st place, gold medalist(s)	Olga Novikova (KAZ)	31:11
2nd place, silver medalist(s)	Yevgeniya Kuzmina (KAZ)	34:46
3rd place, bronze medalist(s)	Liu Xiaoting (CHN)	48:40
4	Kim Ja-youn (KOR)	49:24
5	Choi Seel-bi (KOR)	56:57
6	Chinbatyn Otgontsetseg (MGL)	1:08:46
7	Evgenia Chernobaeva (KGZ)	1:21:51
—	Nandintsetsegiin Uugantsetseg (MGL)	DSQ
—	Elena Rybalova (KGZ)	DSQ
