= Ski orienteering at the 2011 Asian Winter Games – Women's sprint =

Women's sprint at the 2011 Asian Winter Games
- Venue: Biathlon and Cross-Country Ski Complex
- Dates: 31 January 2011
- Competitors: 9 from 5 nations

Medalists
gold medal	Olga Novikova	Kazakhstan
silver medal	Liu Xiaoting	China
bronze medal	Yevgeniya Kuzmina	Kazakhstan

The women's sprint (2970 meters) event at the 2011 Asian Winter Games was held on 31 January at the Almaty Biathlon and Cross-Country Ski Complex.

== Schedule ==
All times are Almaty Time (UTC+06:00)

Date	Time	Event
Monday, 31 January 2011	10:00	Final

== Results ==
Rank	Athlete	Time
1st place, gold medalist(s)	Olga Novikova (KAZ)	13:04.7
2nd place, silver medalist(s)	Liu Xiaoting (CHN)	17:29.8
3rd place, bronze medalist(s)	Yevgeniya Kuzmina (KAZ)	18:46.8
4	Kim Ja-youn (KOR)	26:46.8
5	Altantsetsegiin Narantsetseg (MGL)	28:55.3
6	Lee Ha-na (KOR)	31:17.7
7	Chinbatyn Otgontsetseg (MGL)	32:47.3
8	Olga Gorozhanina (KGZ)	41:58.0
9	Elena Rybalova (KGZ)	52:42.7
