= Ski orienteering at the 2011 Asian Winter Games – Women's relay =

Women's relay at the 2011 Asian Winter Games
- Venue: Biathlon and Cross-Country Ski Complex
- Dates: 5 February 2011
- Competitors: 12 from 4 nations

Medalists
| gold medal | Kazakhstan; Yevgeniya Kuzmina, Elmira Moldasheva, Olga Novikova |
| silver medal | South Korea; Kim Ja-youn, Lee Ha-na, Choi Seel-bi |
| bronze medal | Mongolia; Nandintsetsegiin Uugantsetseg, Altantsetsegiin Narantsetseg, Chinbatyn Otgontsetseg |

The women's relay (3 × 3.07 kilometers) event at the 2011 Asian Winter Games was held on 5 February at the Almaty Biathlon and Cross-Country Ski Complex.

== Schedule ==
All times are Almaty Time (UTC+06:00)

| Date | Time | Event |
|---|---|---|
| Saturday, 5 February 2011 | 14:00 | Final |

== Results ==
| Rank | Team | Time |
|---|---|---|
| 1st place, gold medalist(s) | Kazakhstan (KAZ) | 59:43 |
| | Yevgeniya Kuzmina | 20:29 |
| | Elmira Moldasheva | 22:01 |
| | Olga Novikova | 17:13 |
| 2nd place, silver medalist(s) | South Korea (KOR) | 1:18:00 |
| | Kim Ja-youn | 25:04 |
| | Lee Ha-na | 26:20 |
| | Choi Seel-bi | 26:36 |
| 3rd place, bronze medalist(s) | Mongolia (MGL) | 1:33:03 |
| | Nandintsetsegiin Uugantsetseg | 28:39 |
| | Altantsetsegiin Narantsetseg | 33:23 |
| | Chinbatyn Otgontsetseg | 31:01 |
| 4 | Kyrgyzstan (KGZ) | 2:17:56 |
| | Olga Gorozhanina | 41:23 |
| | Evgenia Chernobaeva | 52:32 |
| | Elena Rybalova | 44:01 |
