= Jet ski at the 2018 Asian Games – Runabout limited =

Runabout limited at the 2018 Asian Games
- Venue: Ancol Beach
- Dates: 23–24 August 2018
- Competitors: 14 from 8 nations

Medalists
gold medal	Ali Al-Lanjawi	United Arab Emirates
silver medal	Aero Sutan Aswar	Indonesia
bronze medal	Aqsa Sutan Aswar	Indonesia

The runabout limited event at the 2018 Asian Games took place on 23–24 August 2018 at Ancol Beach, Jakarta, Indonesia.

== Schedule ==
All times are Western Indonesia Time (UTC+07:00)

Date	Time	Event
Thursday, 23 August 2018	12:00	Moto 1
Thursday, 23 August 2018	14:30	Moto 2
Friday, 24 August 2018	10:00	Moto 3
Friday, 24 August 2018	15:30	Moto 4

== Results ==
Legend

- DNR — Did not race

Rank	Athlete	Moto 1		Moto 2		Moto 3		Moto 4		Total
Rank	Athlete	Rank	Pts	Rank	Pts	Rank	Pts	Rank	Pts	Total
1st place, gold medalist(s)	Ali Al-Lanjawi (UAE)	2	53	1	60	2	53	5	39	205
2nd place, silver medalist(s)	Aero Sutan Aswar (INA)	5	39	2	53	4	43	2	53	188
3rd place, bronze medalist(s)	Aqsa Sutan Aswar (INA)	1	60	3	48	3	48	8	30	186
4	Wu Ronghua (CHN)	4	43	4	43	7	33	1	60	179
5	Lee Dae-soo (KOR)	7	33	6	36	6	36	3	48	153
6	Chalermpoj Viriyahphan (THA)	3	48	5	39	8	30	9	27	144
7	Supak Settura (THA)	10	24	10	24	1	60	6	36	144
8	Mohamed Mohsin (UAE)	8	30	8	30	5	39	4	43	142
9	Kim Sung-min (KOR)	6	36	9	27	9	27	7	33	123
10	Hesham Bakhsh (KSA)	9	27	7	33	DNR		DNR		60
—	Saly Ou Moeut (CAM)	DNR		DNR		DNR		DNR		DNR
—	Tee Chen Jet (MAS)	DNR		DNR		DNR		DNR		DNR
—	Min Mustan (CAM)	DNR		DNR		DNR		DNR		DNR
—	Wang Xiaomei (CHN)	DNR		DNR		DNR		DNR		DNR
