= Jet ski at the 2018 Asian Games – Runabout endurance open =

Endurance runabout open at the 2018 Asian Games
- Venue: Ancol Beach
- Dates: 25–26 August 2018
- Competitors: 14 from 8 nations

Medalists
gold medal	Aqsa Sutan Aswar	Indonesia
silver medal	Ali Al-Lanjawi	United Arab Emirates
bronze medal	Suphathat Footrakul	Thailand

The endurance runabout open event at the 2018 Asian Games took place on 25–26 August 2018 at Ancol Beach, Jakarta, Indonesia.

== Schedule ==
All times are Western Indonesia Time (UTC+07:00)

Date	Time	Event
Saturday, 25 August 2018	14:00	Moto 1
Sunday, 26 August 2018	13:00	Moto 2
Sunday, 26 August 2018	15:00	Moto 3

== Results ==
Legend

- DNR — Did not race

Rank	Athlete	Moto 1			Moto 2			Moto 3			Total
Rank	Athlete	Rank	Pen.	Pts	Rank	Pen.	Pts	Rank	Pen.	Pts	Total
1st place, gold medalist(s)	Aqsa Sutan Aswar (INA)	1		400	3		368	2	−5	375	1143
2nd place, silver medalist(s)	Ali Al-Lanjawi (UAE)	10		332	1		400	1	−5	395	1127
3rd place, bronze medalist(s)	Suphathat Footrakul (THA)	3		368	4		360	4		360	1088
4	Kim Jin-won (KOR)	2	−15	365	2		380	9		336	1081
5	Teera Settura (THA)	4		360	6		348	6		348	1056
6	Manea Al-Marzooqi (UAE)	5	−5	347	5		352	8		340	1039
7	Saud Ahmed (KSA)	6	−5	343	7		344	5		352	1039
8	Aero Sutan Aswar (INA)	13		320	9		336	3		368	1024
9	Billy Joseph Ang (PHI)	12		324	11		328	10		332	984
10	Lee Min (KOR)	8	−30	310	8		340	7	−10	334	984
11	Saifullah Al-Aziz Nazar (MAS)	7		344	10		332	DNR			676
12	Saly Ou Moeut (CAM)	9	−10	326	DNR			DNR			326
13	Khalid Al-Otaibi (KSA)	11	−5	323	DNR			DNR			323
—	Min Mustan (CAM)	DNR			DNR			DNR			DNR
