= List of Asian Games medalists in bandy =

This is the complete list of Asian Winter Games medalists in bandy in 2011.

== Men ==
Games	Gold	Silver	Bronze
2011 Astana–Almaty	Kazakhstan (KAZ); Dmitriy Nikitin; Nurlan Urazgaliyev; Pyotr Gribanov; Vladislav Novozhilov; Askar Temirgaliyev; Yelaman Alipkaliyev; Iskander Nugmanov; Anton Larionov; Rauan Isaliyev; Vitaliy Suyetnov; Samat Amanshin; Arstan Kazybayev; Sultan Kadirzhanov; Dmitriy Karmak; Sergey Tokmakov; Nikolay Shavaldin; Nariman Takirov; Ilyas Khairekishev	Mongolia (MGL); Bayarsaikhany Mönkhbold; Ochirpüreviin Enkhbayar; Tsogtsaikhany Odsaikhan; Tsogoogiin Myagmardorj; Bayajikhyn Boldbayar; Sükhbaataryn Och; Ganbatyn Negüün; Tsogtoogiin Shinebayar; Tseveen Gan-Ochir; Davaadorjiin Mungunkhuyag; Jargalsaikhany Bayarsaikhan; Ganboldyn Tamir; Bat-Erdeniin Chinzorig	Kyrgyzstan (KGZ); Elzar Bolotbekov; Kaldybek Kulmanbetov; Tologon Zholdosh Uulu; Nuraly Kulmanbetov; Bakytbek Asankulov; Azamat Begimbaev; Sagynbek Kadyrov; Berdibek Imanbekov; Almanbet Kulchunov; Bakytbek Duysheyev; Nurbek Nogoev; Ramis Zhumataev; Mukhtarbek Tynymseitov; Nurbek Togolokov; Murasbek Osmonov; Chynarbek Beishenbekov; Kurmanbek Imankariev
