= Jet ski at the 2018 Asian Games – Ski modified =

Ski modified at the 2018 Asian Games
- Venue: Ancol Beach
- Dates: 23–25 August 2018
- Competitors: 9 from 5 nations

Medalists
gold medal	Saly Ou Moeut	Cambodia
silver medal	Kasidit Teeraprateep	Thailand
bronze medal	Nuttakorn Pupakdee	Thailand

The ski modified event at the 2018 Asian Games took place on 23–25 August 2018 at Ancol Beach, Jakarta, Indonesia.

== Schedule ==
All times are Western Indonesia Time (UTC+07:00)

Date	Time	Event
Thursday, 23 August 2018	10:00	Moto 1
Friday, 24 August 2018	09:00	Moto 2
Friday, 24 August 2018	14:30	Moto 3
Saturday, 25 August 2018	11:15	Moto 4

== Results ==
Legend

- DNF — Did not finish
- DNR — Did not race

Rank	Athlete	Moto 1		Moto 2		Moto 3		Moto 4		Total
Rank	Athlete	Rank	Pts	Rank	Pts	Rank	Pts	Rank	Pts	Total
1st place, gold medalist(s)	Saly Ou Moeut (CAM)	2	53	1	60	1	60	1	60	233
2nd place, silver medalist(s)	Kasidit Teeraprateep (THA)	1	60	3	48	6	36	5	39	183
3rd place, bronze medalist(s)	Nuttakorn Pupakdee (THA)	4	43	4	43	4	43	3	48	177
4	Abdalla Al-Hammadi (UAE)	5	39	6	36	3	48	4	43	166
5	Sultan Al-Hammadi (UAE)	6	36	7	33	2	53	6	36	158
6	Wang Xiaomei (CHN)	3	48	5	39	7	33	7	33	153
7	Min Mustan (CAM)	DNF		2	53	5	39	2	53	145
8	Aqsa Sutan Aswar (INA)	7	33	DNR		DNR		DNR		33
9	Muhammad Farizi (INA)	8	30	DNR		DNR		DNR		30
