= Jet ski at the 2018 Asian Games – Runabout 1100 stock =

Runabout 1100 stock at the 2018 Asian Games
- Venue: Ancol Beach
- Dates: 23–25 August 2018
- Competitors: 14 from 8 nations

Medalists
gold medal	Attapon Kunsa	Thailand
silver medal	Phadit Buree	Thailand
bronze medal	Saly Ou Moeut	Cambodia

The runabout 1100 stock event at the 2018 Asian Games took place on 23–25 August 2018 at Ancol Beach, Jakarta, Indonesia.

== Schedule ==
All times are Western Indonesia Time (UTC+07:00)

Date	Time	Event
Thursday, 23 August 2018	09:00	Moto 1
Thursday, 23 August 2018	13:30	Moto 2
Friday, 24 August 2018	13:15	Moto 3
Saturday, 25 August 2018	10:30	Moto 4

== Results ==
Legend

- DNR — Did not race

Rank	Athlete	Moto 1		Moto 2		Moto 3		Moto 4		Total
Rank	Athlete	Rank	Pts	Rank	Pts	Rank	Pts	Rank	Pts	Total
1st place, gold medalist(s)	Attapon Kunsa (THA)	2	53	2	53	5	39	1	60	205
2nd place, silver medalist(s)	Phadit Buree (THA)	1	60	1	60	1	60	11	22	202
3rd place, bronze medalist(s)	Saly Ou Moeut (CAM)	5	39	3	48	4	43	2	53	183
4	Khalid Al-Maazmi (UAE)	4	43	6	36	2	53	5	39	171
5	Muhammad Farizi (INA)	3	48	4	43	7	33	9	27	151
6	Saifullah Al-Aziz Nazar (MAS)	7	33	8	30	6	36	4	43	142
7	Min Mustan (CAM)	8	30	7	33	11	22	3	48	133
8	Sultan Al-Hammadi (UAE)	10	24	10	24	3	48	8	30	126
9	Tee Chen Jet (MAS)	9	27	5	39	10	24	7	33	123
10	Yang Seo-jin (KOR)	11	22	9	27	9	27	6	36	112
11	Kim Sung-won (KOR)	12	20	12	20	8	30	10	24	94
12	Aqsa Sutan Aswar (INA)	6	36	11	22	DNR		DNR		58
—	Billy Joseph Ang (PHI)	DNR		DNR		DNR		DNR		DNR
—	Saud Ahmed (KSA)	DNR		DNR		DNR		DNR		DNR
