= Bi Yuxin =

Chienese ski mountaineer

Personal information
- Born: 30 June 2006 (age 19)

Sport
- Country: China
- Sport: Ski mountaineering
Medal record
Men's ski mountaineering
Representing China
Asian Winter Games
| Silver medal – second place | 2025 Harbin | Mixed relay |
| Bronze medal – third place | 2025 Harbin | Sprint race |

Bi Yuxin (born 30 June 2006) is a Chinese ski mountaineer.

== Career ==
Bi represented China at the 2025 Asian Winter Games and won a silver medal in the mixed relay, along with Yu Jingxuan, with a time of 28:20.96. He also won a bronze medal in the sprint race with a time of 2:25.65.
