= Ju-jitsu at the 2018 Asian Games – Women's 49 kg =

Women's jiu-jitsu 49 kg at the 2018 Asian Games
- Venue: Jakarta Convention Center
- Dates: 24 August 2018
- Competitors: 19 from 13 nations

Medalists
gold medal	Jessa Khan	Cambodia
silver medal	Mahra Al-Hinaai	United Arab Emirates
bronze medal	Meggie Ochoa	Philippines
bronze medal	Dương Thị Thanh Minh	Vietnam

The women's jiu-jitsu (ne-waza) 49 kilograms Ju-jitsu competition at the 2018 Asian Games in Jakarta was held on 24 August 2018 at the Jakarta Convention Center Assembly Hall. Ju-jitsu made its debut at the 2018 Asian Games. Earlier, it was incorporated into the 2017 Asian Indoor and Martial Arts Games.

== Schedule ==
All times are Western Indonesia Time (UTC+07:00)

Date	Time	Event
Friday, 24 August 2018	10:00	1/16 finals
Friday, 24 August 2018	10:00	1/8 finals
Friday, 24 August 2018	10:00	1/4 finals
Friday, 24 August 2018	10:00	Final of repechage
Friday, 24 August 2018	10:00	Final of tables
Friday, 24 August 2018	16:00	Finals

== Results ==
Legend

- DQ — Won by disqualification
- SU — Won by submission (100–0)

=== Main bracket ===
==== Final ====
Final
Mahra Al-Hinaai (UAE)	0
Jessa Khan (CAM)	0^{SU}

==== Top half ====
1/16 finals
Meggie Ochoa (PHI)	0
Yasmeen Al-Khatib (JOR)	0
Cornelia Lumban Tobing (INA)	0
Dương Thị Thanh Minh (VIE)	5

1/8 finals
Meggie Ochoa (PHI)	2
Siramol Deepudsa (THA)	0
Dương Thị Thanh Minh (VIE)	3
Saýara Awezmetowa (TKM)	0
Moldir Mekenbayeva (KAZ)	0
Mönkhgereliin Bayarmaa (MGL)	2
Arifa Sanjar (AFG)
Mahra Al-Hinaai (UAE)	DQ

1/4 finals
Meggie Ochoa (PHI)	0
Dương Thị Thanh Minh (VIE)	0
Mönkhgereliin Bayarmaa (MGL)	0
Mahra Al-Hinaai (UAE)	0

Final of tables
Dương Thị Thanh Minh (VIE)	0
Mahra Al-Hinaai (UAE)	14

==== Bottom half ====
1/16 finals
Suwanan Boonsorn (THA)	0
Jessa Khan (CAM)	13^{SU}

1/8 finals
Jessa Khan (CAM)	DQ
La Yiwen (CHN)
Đào Lê Thu Trang (VIE)	0
Nahid Pirhadi (IRI)	2
Kaila Napolis (PHI)	0^{SU}
Santi Apriyani Savitri (INA)	0
Battamiriin Khorloo (MGL)
Wadima Al-Yafei (UAE)	DQ

1/4 finals
Jessa Khan (CAM)	0^{SU}
Nahid Pirhadi (IRI)	0
Kaila Napolis (PHI)	0^{SU}
Wadima Al-Yafei (UAE)	0

Final of tables
Jessa Khan (CAM)	0
Kaila Napolis (PHI)	0

=== Repechage ===
Final of repechage
Meggie Ochoa (PHI)	0^{SU}
Mönkhgereliin Bayarmaa (MGL)	0
Nahid Pirhadi (IRI)	3
Wadima Al-Yafei (UAE)	6

Bronze medals
Meggie Ochoa (PHI)	2
Kaila Napolis (PHI)	0
Wadima Al-Yafei (UAE)	0
Dương Thị Thanh Minh (VIE)	3
