= Ski mountaineering at the 2025 Asian Winter Games – Women's sprint =

Women's sprint at the 2025 Asian Winter Games
- Venue: Yabuli Ski Resort
- Dates: 9 February 2025
- Competitors: 17 from 6 nations

Medalists
gold medal	Cidan Yuzhen	China
silver medal	Yu Jingxuan	China
bronze medal	Suolang Quzhen	China

The women's sprint ski mountaineering event at the 2025 Asian Winter Games was held on 9 February 2025 at Yabuli Ski Resort, near Harbin in China.

China achieved a podium sweep in this event.

== Schedule ==
All times are China Standard Time (UTC+08:00)

Date	Time	Event
Sunday, 9 February 2025	10:30	Qualification
Sunday, 9 February 2025	11:10	Semifinals
Sunday, 9 February 2025	12:10	Final

== Results ==
Legend

- DNF — Did not finish
- DNS — Did not start

=== Qualification ===
Rank	Athlete	Time	Pen.
1	Cidan Yuzhen (CHN)	3:09.31	
2	Suolang Quzhen (CHN)	3:17.75	
3	Ji Lulu (CHN)	3:18.24	
4	Yu Jingxuan (CHN)	3:29.13	
5	Sora Takizawa (JPN)	3:36.74	
6	Natsumi Usui (JPN)	3:39.97	
7	Yurie Tanaka (JPN)	3:41.19	
8	Jeong Ye-ji (KOR)	3:46.09	
9	Assem Nazyrova (KAZ)	3:48.61	
10	Marzieh Baha (IRI)	4:07.29	
11	Fatemeh Seid (IRI)	4:10.05	
12	Kim Ha-na (KOR)	5:06.90	
13	Kim Mee-jin (KOR)	5:30.06	
—	Feruza Bobokulova (UZB)	DNS	
—	Asila Shayimova (UZB)	DNS	
—	Mokhinur Aralova (UZB)	DNS	
—	Ezoza Shaymardonova (UZB)	DNS	

=== Semifinals ===
- Qualification: First 2 in each heat (Q) and the next 2 fastest lucky loser (LL) advance to the final.

==== Heat 1 ====
Rank	Athlete	Time	Pen.	Notes
1	Yu Jingxuan (CHN)	3:19.36		Q
2	Cidan Yuzhen (CHN)	3:20.17		Q
3	Sora Takizawa (JPN)	3:23.83		LL
4	Assem Nazyrova (KAZ)	3:45.75		
5	Jeong Ye-ji (KOR)	3:46.98		
—	Kim Ha-na (KOR)	DNF		

==== Heat 2 ====
Rank	Athlete	Time	Pen.	Notes
1	Suolang Quzhen (CHN)	3:16.67		Q
2	Ji Lulu (CHN)	3:18.50		Q
3	Yurie Tanaka (JPN)	3:26.62		LL
4	Natsumi Usui (JPN)	3:39.62		
5	Marzieh Baha (IRI)	3:57.49		
6	Fatemeh Seid (IRI)	4:13.64		

=== Final ===
Rank	Athlete	Time	Pen.
1st place, gold medalist(s)	Cidan Yuzhen (CHN)	2:55.88	
2nd place, silver medalist(s)	Yu Jingxuan (CHN)	2:59.84	
3rd place, bronze medalist(s)	Suolang Quzhen (CHN)	3:01.78	
4	Ji Lulu (CHN)	3:04.31	
5	Yurie Tanaka (JPN)	3:22.59	
6	Sora Takizawa (JPN)	3:28.98	
