= Ski mountaineering at the 2025 Asian Winter Games – Men's sprint =

Men's sprint at the 2025 Asian Winter Games
- Venue: Yabuli Ski Resort
- Dates: 9 February 2025
- Competitors: 23 from 9 nations

Medalists
gold medal	Bu Luer	China
silver medal	Zhang Chenghao	China
bronze medal	Bi Yuxin	China

The men's sprint ski mountaineering event at the 2025 Asian Winter Games was held on 9 February 2025 at Yabuli Ski Resort, near Harbin in China.

China achieved a podium sweep in this event.

== Schedule ==
All times are China Standard Time (UTC+08:00)

Date	Time	Event
Sunday, 9 February 2025	10:45	Qualification
Sunday, 9 February 2025	11:45	Semifinals
Sunday, 9 February 2025	12:20	Final

== Results ==
Legend

- DSQ — Disqualified

=== Qualification ===
Rank	Athlete	Time	Pen.
1	Bi Yuxin (CHN)	2:41.22	
2	Liu Jianbin (CHN)	2:41.48	
3	Zhang Chenghao (CHN)	2:44.02	
4	Bu Luer (CHN)	2:48.20	
5	Jung Jae-won (KOR)	2:54.10	
6	Ari Hirabayashi (JPN)	2:54.72	
7	Kenta Endo (JPN)	3:09.51	
8	Ali Kalhor (IRI)	3:17.93	
9	Niyaz Janzakov (KAZ)	3:19.68	
10	Gu Gyo-jeong (KOR)	3:35.64	
11	Denis Vlassov (KAZ)	3:37.82	
12	Jérémy Knoerr (THA)	3:39.39	
13	Mohsen Saveei (IRI)	3:39.88	
14	Tokutaro Shima (JPN)	3:40.07	+1:00
15	Georges Wakim (LBN)	3:51.66	
16	Jasur Shamsiddinov (UZB)	3:52.71	
17	Oh Young-hwan (KOR)	3:52.79	
18	Izozbek Khushvaktov (UZB)	3:59.46	
19	Shyngys Baikashev (KAZ)	4:01.40	
20	Makhsudjon Akabirov (UZB)	4:06.92	+0:10
21	Timur Artyukhin (KAZ)	4:30.93	
22	Khalifa El-Magarmid (QAT)	9:11.59	
—	Shohruh Sardorov (UZB)	DSQ	

=== Semifinals ===
- Qualification: First 2 in each heat (Q) and the next 2 fastest lucky loser (LL) advance to the final.

==== Heat 1 ====
Rank	Athlete	Time	Pen.	Notes
1	Bu Luer (CHN)	2:40.65		Q
2	Bi Yuxin (CHN)	2:41.46		Q
3	Jung Jae-won (KOR)	2:48.57		
4	Ali Kalhor (IRI)	3:03.40		
5	Niyaz Janzakov (KAZ)	3:25.23		
6	Jérémy Knoerr (THA)	3:35.38		

==== Heat 2 ====
Rank	Athlete	Time	Pen.	Notes
1	Zhang Chenghao (CHN)	2:35.65		Q
2	Liu Jianbin (CHN)	2:37.68		Q
3	Ari Hirabayashi (JPN)	2:42.45		LL
4	Kenta Endo (JPN)	2:45.80		LL
5	Denis Vlassov (KAZ)	3:41.14		
6	Gu Gyo-jeong (KOR)	4:29.78	+0:10	

=== Final ===
Rank	Athlete	Time	Pen.
1st place, gold medalist(s)	Bu Luer (CHN)	2:22.29	
2nd place, silver medalist(s)	Zhang Chenghao (CHN)	2:22.91	
3rd place, bronze medalist(s)	Bi Yuxin (CHN)	2:25.65	
4	Liu Jianbin (CHN)	2:34.88	
5	Ari Hirabayashi (JPN)	2:47.07	
6	Kenta Endo (JPN)	2:52.76	
