= List of Asian Games medalists in sambo =

This is the complete list of Asian Games medalists in sambo on 2018.

== Men ==
=== 52 kg ===
Games	Gold	Silver	Bronze
2018 Jakarta–Palembang	Baglan Ibragim (KAZ)	Shaaluugiin Erdenebaatar (MGL)	Beimbet Kanzhanov (KAZ)
2018 Jakarta–Palembang	Baglan Ibragim (KAZ)	Shaaluugiin Erdenebaatar (MGL)	Akhmad Rakhmatilloev (UZB)

=== 90 kg ===
Games	Gold	Silver	Bronze
2018 Jakarta–Palembang	Kamoliddin Kholmamatov (UZB)	Umed Khasanbekov (TJK)	Alibek Zekenov (KAZ)
2018 Jakarta–Palembang	Kamoliddin Kholmamatov (UZB)	Umed Khasanbekov (TJK)	Komronshokh Ustopiriyon (TJK)

== Women ==
=== 48 kg ===
Games	Gold	Silver	Bronze
2018 Jakarta–Palembang	Ganbaataryn Narantsetseg (MGL)	Baasansürengiin Oidovchimed (MGL)	Aizhan Zhylkybayeva (KAZ)
2018 Jakarta–Palembang	Ganbaataryn Narantsetseg (MGL)	Baasansürengiin Oidovchimed (MGL)	Nodira Gulova (UZB)

=== 69 kg ===
Games	Gold	Silver	Bronze
2018 Jakarta–Palembang	Dildash Kuryshbayeva (KAZ)	Nilufar Davletova (UZB)	Natsuki Tomi (JPN)
2018 Jakarta–Palembang	Dildash Kuryshbayeva (KAZ)	Nilufar Davletova (UZB)	Tsogt-Ochiryn Battsetseg (MGL)
