= Zhang Chenghao =

Chienese ski mountaineer (born 2002)

Personal information
- Born: 18 January 2002 (age 24)

Sport
- Country: China
- Sport: Ski mountaineering
Medal record
Men's ski mountaineering
Representing China
Asian Winter Games
Silver medal – second place	2025 Harbin	Sprint race

Zhang Chenghao (born 18 January 2002) is a Chinese ski mountaineer.

== Career ==
Zhang represented China at the 2020 Winter Youth Olympics in cross-country skiing.

He represented China at the 2025 Asian Winter Games and won a silver medal in the sprint race with a time of 2:22.91, finishing 0.62 seconds behind gold medalist Bu Luer.
