= List of Asian Games medalists in paragliding =

This is the complete list of Asian Games medalists in paragliding in 2018.

== Men ==
=== Individual accuracy ===
Games	Gold	Silver	Bronze
2018 Jakarta–Palembang	Jafro Megawanto (INA)	Jirasak Witeetham (THA)	Lee Chul-soo (KOR)

=== Team accuracy ===
Games	Gold	Silver	Bronze
2018 Jakarta–Palembang	Indonesia (INA); Aris Apriansyah; Joni Efendi; Jafro Megawanto; Hening Paradigma; Roni Pratama	South Korea (KOR); Kim Jin-oh; Lee Chang-min; Lee Chul-soo; Lee Seong-min; Lim Moon-seob	Thailand (THA); Sarayut Chinpongsatorn; Tanapat Luangiam; Mongkut Preecha; Jirasak Witeetham; Nithat Yangjui

=== Team cross-country ===
Games	Gold	Silver	Bronze
2018 Jakarta–Palembang	Japan (JPN); Yoshiaki Hirokawa; Takuo Iwasaki; Taro Kamiyama; Yoshiki Kuremoto; Yoshiaki Nakagawa	Nepal (NEP); Bimal Adhikari; Bijay Gautam; Sushil Gurung; Yukesh Gurung; Bishal Thapa	Indonesia (INA); Aris Apriansyah; Joni Efendi; Jafro Megawanto; Hening Paradigma; Roni Pratama

== Women ==
=== Individual accuracy ===
Games	Gold	Silver	Bronze
2018 Jakarta–Palembang	Nunnapat Phuchong (THA)	Lee Da-gyeom (KOR)	Rika Wijayanti (INA)

=== Team accuracy ===
Games	Gold	Silver	Bronze
2018 Jakarta–Palembang	Thailand (THA); Chantika Chaisanuk; Nunnapat Phuchong; Narubhorn Wathaya	Indonesia (INA); Lis Andriana; Rika Wijayanti; Ike Ayu Wulandari	South Korea (KOR); Baek Jin-hee; Jang Woo-young; Lee Da-gyeom

=== Team cross-country ===
Games	Gold	Silver	Bronze
2018 Jakarta–Palembang	South Korea (KOR); Baek Jin-hee; Jang Woo-young; Lee Da-gyeom	Japan (JPN); Keiko Hiraki; Nao Mochizuki; Atsuko Yamashita	Indonesia (INA); Lis Andriana; Rika Wijayanti; Ike Ayu Wulandari
