= Ski mountaineering at the 2025 Asian Winter Games – Mixed relay =

Mixed relay at the 2025 Asian Winter Games
- Venue: Yabuli Ski Resort
- Dates: 12 February 2025
- Competitors: 26 from 6 nations

Medalists
gold medal	Cidan Yuzhen; Bu Luer	China
silver medal	Yu Jingxuan; Bi Yuxin	China
bronze medal	Suolang Quzhen; Liu Jianbin	China

The mixed relay ski mountaineering event at the 2025 Asian Winter Games was held on 12 February 2025 at Yabuli Ski Resort, near Harbin in China.

China achieved a podium sweep in this event.

== Schedule ==
All times are China Standard Time (UTC+08:00)

Date	Time	Event
Wednesday, 12 February 2025	10:30	Qualification
Wednesday, 12 February 2025	11:40	Final

== Results ==
Legend

- DNS — Did not start

=== Qualification ===
Rank	Team	Time	Pen.
1	Japan (JPN)	14:08.39	
	Yurie Tanaka	7:44.36	
	Tokutaro Shima	6:24.03	
2	China (CHN)	14:35.56	
	Cidan Yuzhen	7:48.60	
	Bu Luer	6:46.96	
3	China (CHN)	14:44.51	
	Suolang Quzhen	7:52.41	
	Liu Jianbin	6:52.10	
4	China (CHN)	15:01.05	
	Yu Jingxuan	8:16.93	
	Bi Yuxin	6:44.22	
5	Japan (JPN)	15:03.70	
	Sora Takizawa	8:08.20	
	Ari Hirabayashi	6:55.50	
6	Japan (JPN)	15:34.41	
	Natsumi Usui	8:15.13	
	Kenta Endo	7:19.28	
7	South Korea (KOR)	16:30.35	
	Jeong Ye-ji	8:50.82	
	Jung Jae-won	7:39.53	
8	Iran (IRI)	17:08.24	+1:00
	Marzieh Baha	9:12.25	
	Ali Kalhor	7:55.99	
9	Kazakhstan (KAZ)	18:15.36	
	Assem Nazyrova	9:44.03	
	Niyaz Janzakov	8:31.33	
10	Iran (IRI)	18:34.45	
	Fatemeh Seid	9:24.49	
	Mohsen Saveei	9:09.96	
11	South Korea (KOR)	19:28.62	
	Kim Mee-jin	10:14.98	
	Gu Gyo-jeong	9:13.64	
12	Uzbekistan (UZB)	21:51.63	+0:10
	Asila Shayimova	13:01.65	
	Jasur Shamsiddinov	8:49.98	
—	South Korea (KOR)	DNS	
	Kim Ha-na	DNS	
	Oh Young-hwan	10:00.73	

==== Final ====
Rank	Team	Round 1/2	Round 3/4	Time	Pen.
1st place, gold medalist(s)	China (CHN)			27:48.67	
	Cidan Yuzhen	7:34.1	7:33.4		
	Bu Luer	6:07.6	6:33.5		
2nd place, silver medalist(s)	China (CHN)			28:20.96	
	Yu Jingxuan	7:50.0	7:48.4		
	Bi Yuxin	6:09.9	6:32.6		
3rd place, bronze medalist(s)	China (CHN)			29:27.67	
	Suolang Quzhen	7:32.8	7:52.2		
	Liu Jianbin	6:36.8	7:25.8		
4	Japan (JPN)			29:36.29	
	Yurie Tanaka	7:47.5	8:22.5		
	Tokutaro Shima	6:20.1	7:06.1		
5	Japan (JPN)			30:26.66	
	Sora Takizawa	8:09.5	8:17.8		
	Ari Hirabayashi	7:02.5	6:56.8		
6	Japan (JPN)			31:03.01	
	Natsumi Usui	8:02.2	8:21.2		
	Kenta Endo	6:52.2	7:47.4		
7	South Korea (KOR)			33:43.24	
	Jeong Ye-ji	8:47.9	9:31.8		
	Jung Jae-won	7:36.2	7:47.3		
8	Kazakhstan (KAZ)			36:43.77	+1:00
	Assem Nazyrova	9:28.2	9:02.1		
	Niyaz Janzakov	8:25.4	9:48.0		
9	Iran (IRI)			37:41.84	+2:00
	Marzieh Baha	9:25.1	9:59.7		
	Ali Kalhor	8:03.9	10:13.1		
10	South Korea (KOR)			38:25.41	
	Kim Mee-jin	10:25.9	10:15.6		
	Gu Gyo-jeong	8:52.1	8:51.8		
11	Iran (IRI)			39:10.08	+1:00
	Fatemeh Seid	9:28.2	12:22.6		
	Mohsen Saveei	6:59.6	10:19.6		
12	Uzbekistan (UZB)			Lapped	+1:00
	Asila Shayimova	5:15.6			
	Jasur Shamsiddinov	8:24.4			
