= Cambodia at the 2018 Asian Games =

- IOC code: CAM
- NOC: National Olympic Committee of Cambodia
- Website: www.noccambodia.org (in Khmer)

in Jakarta & Palembang, Indonesia 18 August – 2 September
- Competitors: 43 in 13 sports
- Flag bearer: Sorn Seavmey
- Medals Ranked 24th: Gold 2 Silver 0 Bronze 1 Total 3

Asian Games appearances (overview)
- 1954; 1958; 1962; 1966; 1970; 1974; 1978–1990; 1994; 1998; 2002; 2006; 2010; 2014; 2018; 2022; 2026

Cambodia competed in the 2018 Asian Games in Jakarta and Palembang, Indonesia from 18 August to 2 September 2018. This event marks the 12th Asian Games appearance for Cambodia since making their debut in 1954.

Cambodia will make its debut in the sport of sailing at the Asian Games.

Taekwondo practitioner Sorn Seavmey, was the country's flag bearer during the opening ceremony.

== Medalists ==
The following Cambodia competitors won medals at the Games.

Medal	Name	Sport	Event	Date
Gold	Jessa Khan	Ju-jitsu	Women's 49 kg	24 Aug
Gold	Saly Ou Moeut	Jet ski	Ski modified	25 Aug
Bronze	Saly Ou Moeut	Jet ski	Runabout 1100 stock	25 Aug

Medals by sport
Sport	1st place, gold medalist(s)	2nd place, silver medalist(s)	3rd place, bronze medalist(s)	Total
Jet ski	1	0	1	2
Ju-jitsu	1	0	0	1
Total	2	0	1	3

Medals by day
Day	Date	1st place, gold medalist(s)	2nd place, silver medalist(s)	3rd place, bronze medalist(s)	Total
1	August 19	0	0	0	0
2	August 20	0	0	0	0
3	August 21	0	0	0	0
4	August 22	0	0	0	0
5	August 23	0	0	0	0
6	August 24	1	0	0	1
7	August 25	1	0	1	2
8	August 26	0	0	0	0
9	August 27	0	0	0	0
10	August 28	0	0	0	0
11	August 29	0	0	0	0
12	August 30	0	0	0	0
13	August 31	0	0	0	0
14	September 1	0	0	0	0
15	September 2	0	0	0	0
Total		2	0	1	3

== Competitors ==
45 athletes have been qualified to compete in 13 different sporting events. A total of 43 athletes attended the Games released by the Olympic Council of Asia.

== Athletics ==
Cambodia entered five athletes (1 men and 4 women's) to participate in the athletics competition at the Games.

== Canoeing ==
=== Sprint ===
Athlete	Event	Heats		Semifinal		Final	
Athlete	Event	Time	Rank	Time	Rank	Time	Rank
Horl Lyda	Men's C-1 1000 m	—				5:00.682	7
Ly Torhieth	Men's K-1 200 m	41.349	8 QS	39.274	5	Did not advance	

Qualification legend: QF=Final; QS=Semifinal

== Fencing ==
Individual

Athlete	Event	Preliminary		Round of 32	Round of 16	Quarterfinals	Semifinals	Final	
Athlete	Event	Opposition Score	Rank	Opposition Score	Opposition Score	Opposition Score	Opposition Score	Opposition Score	Rank
Frantisek Paul Vag-Urminsky	Men's épée	Shi GF (CHN): L 3–5; Park S-y (KOR): L 3–5; Juengamnuaychai (THA): L 4–5; MR Tadi (IRI): L 4–5; A Al-Hammadi (UAE): L 3–5; E Dulguun (MGL): W 5–2	6	Did not advance					28
Chim Theara	Men's foil	T Shikine (JPN): L 0–5; Hoàng NH (VIE): L 1–5; MP Bhatt (NEP): W 5–3; Huang MK (CHN): L 1–5; JI Lim (SGP): L 1–5	5	Did not advance					25
Chhay Linly	Women's sabre	S Fukushima (JPN): L 3–5; Yoon J-s (KOR): L 0–5; FR Delcheh (IRI): L 3–5; R Thapa (NEP): W 5–1; D Permatasari (INA): L 4–5	5	Did not advance					19

== Gymnastics ==
Cambodia represented by Choeun Sokden who participate in the men's vault event, but he did not start the competition.

== Jet Ski ==
Cambodian jetskier, Saly Ou Moeut, took home the gold medal in the ski modified event of the 2018 Asian Games at Ancol, North Jakarta, on 25 August. Ou Moeut also won another bronze medal in the Runabout 1100 stock. Ou Moeut became the first male athlete of Cambodian who won gold medal since debut in Asian Games in 1954.

His teammate, Mustan, failed to win any medal because of engine problem during Moto 1. But he still performed well in other rounds.

Athlete	Event	Moto Points				Ded.	Total	Rank
Athlete	Event	1	2	3	4	Ded.	Total	Rank
Saly Ou Moeut	Runabout limited	DNR				—	0	–
Saly Ou Moeut	Runabout 1100 stock	39	48	43	53	—	183	3rd place, bronze medalist(s)
Saly Ou Moeut	Runabout endurance open	336	DNF		—	–10	326	12
Saly Ou Moeut	Ski modified	53	60	60	60	—	233	1st place, gold medalist(s)
Min Mustan	Runabout limited	DNR				—	0	–
Min Mustan	Runabout 1100 stock	30	33	22	48	—	133	7
Min Mustan	Runabout endurance open	DNF			—		0	–
Min Mustan	Ski modified	DNF	53	39	53	—	145	7

== Ju-jitsu ==
Cambodian athlete Jessa Khan won the gold medal in the women's ju-jitsu newaza 49 kg at the 2018 Asian Games after beating United Arab Emirates athlete Mahra Alhinaai by submission at JIExpo Kemayoran, Jakarta, on 24 August.

Key:

- ADV – Won by advantages.
- RDC – Won by referee decision.
- SUB – Won by submission.

Men

Athlete	Event	Round of 32	Round of 16	Quarterfinals	Semifinals	Repechage	Final / BM	Rank
Athlete	Event	Opposition Result	Opposition Result	Opposition Result	Opposition Result	Opposition Result	Opposition Result	Rank
Vivaddhana Khaou	–69 kg	H Al-Kaabi (UAE); W 100^{SUB}–0	J Hojamyradow (TKM); L 0–4	Did not advance				

Women

Athlete	Event	Round of 32	Round of 16	Quarterfinals	Semifinals	Repechage	Final / BM	Rank
Athlete	Event	Opposition Result	Opposition Result	Opposition Result	Opposition Result	Opposition Result	Opposition Result	Rank
Jessa Khan	–49 kg	S Boonsorn (THA); W 100^{SUB}–0	La YW (CHN); DSQ	N Pirhad (IRI); W 100^{SUB}–0	K Napolis (PHI); W 0^{ADV}–0	—	M Al-Hinaai (UAE); W 100^{SUB}–0	1st place, gold medalist(s)

== Judo ==
Key:

- 1st number — Ippon
- 2nd number — Waza-ari
- s — Shido

Men

Athlete	Event	Round of 32	Round of 16	Quarterfinals	Semifinals	Repechage	Final / BM	Rank
Athlete	Event	Opposition Result	Opposition Result	Opposition Result	Opposition Result	Opposition Result	Opposition Result	Rank
Phou Khi Phok	–60 kg	Bye	T Shishime (JPN); L 00–11	Did not advance				
Sun Panhga	–73 kg	A Ayash (YEM); L 00s1–11s1	Did not advance					

== Karate ==
Cambodia entered the karate competition with two men's athletes.

== Sailing ==
Cambodia set up 3 men's sailors to make their debut at the Asian Games.

Men

Athlete	Event	Race															Total	Rank
Athlete	Event	1	2	3	4	5	6	7	8	9	10	11	12	13	14	15	Total	Rank
Soth Mesa	RS:X	~~(10)~~	10	10	10	9	10	10	10	9	10	10	10	9	10	9	136	10
Duch Bunthuoen	Laser	~~(16)~~	16	16	16	16	16	16	16	15	16	15	16	—			174	16

Mixed

Athlete	Event	Race												Total	Rank
Athlete	Event	1	2	3	4	5	6	7	8	9	10	11	12	Total	Rank
Nhov Chan	Laser 4.7	22	23	22	22	~~(24)~~; RET	21	22	21	21	23	23	23	243	23

== Soft tennis ==
Athlete	Event	Group stage				Quarterfinals	Semifinals	Final	
Athlete	Event	Opposition Score	Opposition Score	Opposition Score	Rank	Opposition Score	Opposition Score	Opposition Score	Rank
Samsocheaphearun Doeum	Men's singles	AE Sie (INA); L 0–4	Lê PV (VIE); W 4–2	S Vannasak (LAO); W 4–1	2	Did not advance			
Sophorn Kann	Men's singles	S Uayporn (THA); L 1–4	J Menna (IND); L 3–4	—	3	Did not advance			
Mariyan Meth	Women's singles	N Seth (IND); W 4–3	DR Pitri (INA); L 0–4	—	2	Did not advance			
Sotheary Rin	Women's singles	Kim J-y (KOR); L 0–4	DT Kusrini (INA); L 1–4	—	3	Did not advance			
Sambath Orn; Sotheary Rin	Mixed doubles	N Damian Jr. / N Manalac (PHI); L 1–5	C Leampriboon / T Bunteng (THA); L 2–5	—	3	Did not advance			
Sarsarith Yi; Mariyan Meth	Mixed doubles	W Ratthapobkorrapak / S Naree (THA); L 3–5	Kim B-j / Kim J-y (KOR); L 1–5	—	3	Did not advance			
Samsocheaphearun Doeum; Chamroeun Ek; Sophorn Kann; Sambath Orn; Sarsarith Yi	Men's team	India (IND); W 3–0	Japan (JPN); L 0–3	Indonesia (INA); L 0–3	3	Did not advance			

== Swimming ==
Men

Athlete	Event	Heats		Final	
Athlete	Event	Time	Rank	Time	Rank
Keouodom Lim	50 m backstroke	30.68	32	Did not advance	
Keouodom Lim	50 m butterfly	27.38	35	Did not advance	
Keouodom Lim	100 m butterfly	1:01.47	31	Did not advance	
Thol Thoeun	50 m freestyle	25.80	43	Did not advance	
Thol Thoeun	100 m freestyle	58.78	42	Did not advance	

Women

Athlete	Event	Heats		Final	
Athlete	Event	Time	Rank	Time	Rank
Voleak Sok	50 m breaststroke	36.00	21	Did not advance	
Voleak Sok	100 m breaststroke	1:17.35	20	Did not advance	

== Taekwondo ==
Cambodia entered their athletes (3 men's and 3 women's) into the taekwondo competition at the Games.

Poomsae

Athlete	Event	Round of 16	Quarterfinal	Semifinal	Final	
Athlete	Event	Opposition Score	Opposition Score	Opposition Score	Opposition Score	Rank
Phal Sovannat	Men's individual	Kourosh Bakhtiar (IRI); L 7.81–8.22	Did not advance			
Sim Rachana	Women's individual	Yun Ji-hye (KOR); L 7.70–8.31	Did not advance			

Kyorugi

Athlete	Event	Round of 32	Round of 16	Quarterfinal	Semifinal	Final	
Athlete	Event	Opposition Score	Opposition Score	Opposition Score	Opposition Score	Opposition Score	Rank
Ny Sovannroth	Men's −58 kg	Mahmadjon Sunatov (TJK); L 11-30	Did not advance				
Chhun Soklong	Men's −63 kg	Sardor Toirov (UZB); L 5-25	Did not advance				
Cassie Tubbs	Women's −57 kg	Phạm Thị Thu Hiền (VIE); L 18-19	Did not advance				
Sorn Seavmey	Women's +67 kg	—	Ranuri Wickramasinghe (SRI); W WD	Svetlana Osipova (UZB); L 3-5	Did not advance		

== Wrestling ==
Cambodia put up five wrestlers (2 men's and 3 women's) competed in the freestyle event at the wrestling competition.

Key:

- F – Victory by fall.
- PP – Decision by points – the loser with technical points.
- PO – Decision by points – the loser without technical points.
- ST – Great superiority – the loser without technical points and a margin of victory of at least 8 (Greco-Roman) or 10 (freestyle) points.

Men's freestyle

Athlete	Event	Qualification	Round of 16	Quarterfinal	Semifinal	Repechage 1	Repechage 2	Final / BM	
Athlete	Event	Opposition Result	Opposition Result	Opposition Result	Opposition Result	Opposition Result	Opposition Result	Opposition Result	Rank
Chon Thoun	−65 kg	Bye	D Takatani (JPN); L 0–6^{F}	Did not advance		M Hussain (PAK); L 5–15	Did not advance		14
Heng Vuthy	−86 kg	Bye	P Kumar (IND); L 0–8^{F}	Did not advance					13

Women's freestyle

Athlete	Event	Round of 16	Quarterfinal	Semifinal	Repechage	Final / BM	
Athlete	Event	Opposition Result	Opposition Result	Opposition Result	Opposition Result	Opposition Result	Rank
Dit Samnang	−50 kg	Bye	Kim S-h (PRK); L 0–10	Did not advance			11
Chey Chan Raksmey	−53 kg	J Virangsa (THA); L 4–7	Did not advance				9
Dorn Srors	−57 kg	E Tissina (KAZ); L 0–4^{F}	Did not advance				10

== See also ==
- Cambodia at the 2017 Asian Indoor and Martial Arts Games
- Cambodia at the 2018 Asian Para Games
