= Suolang Quzhen =

Chinese ski mountaineer (born 2003)

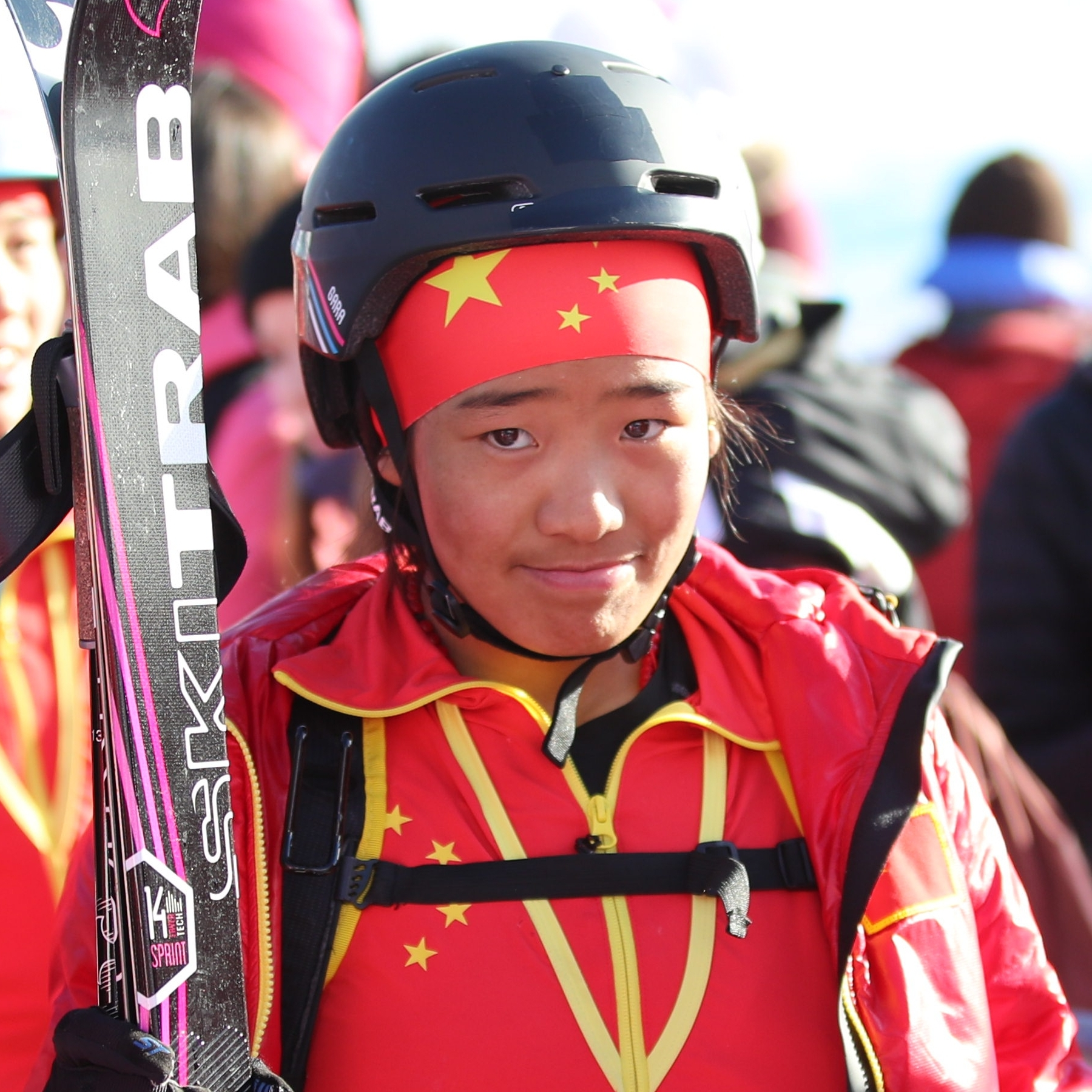
- Quzhen at the 2020 Winter Youth Olympics

Personal information
- Born: 29 May 2003 (age 23)

Sport
- Country: China
- Sport: Ski mountaineering
Medal record
Women's ski mountaineering
Representing China
Asian Winter Games
Bronze medal – third place	2025 Harbin	Sprint race
Bronze medal – third place	2025 Harbin	Mixed relay

Suolang Quzhen (born 29 May 2003) is a Chinese ski mountaineer.

== Career ==
Suolang represented China at the 2020 Winter Youth Olympics and finished in fourth place in the sprint race with a time of 3:33.00.

She represented China at the 2025 Asian Winter Games and won a bronze medal in the sprint race with a time of 3:01.78. She also won a bronze medal in the mixed relay, along with Liu Jianbin, with a time of 29:27.67. In January 2026, she was selected to represent China at the 2026 Winter Olympics.
