= Mikhail Sorokin =

Russian-Kazakhstani ski orienteer

Medal record

Men's Ski-orienteering

Representing Russia

Junior World Championships
Bronze medal – third place	2001 Trentino	Long

Representing Kazakhstan

Asian Games
Gold medal – first place	2011 Astana-Almaty	Sprint
Gold medal – first place	2011 Astana-Almaty	Middle
Gold medal – first place	2011 Astana-Almaty	Long

Mikhail Sorokin is a ski-orienteering competitor who has competed for Russia and Kazakhstan. He won a bronze medal at the Junior World Ski Orienteering Championships in 2001. He competed for Russia at the 2009 World Ski Orienteering Championships in Rusutsu, where he placed 12th in the long distance. Competing for Kazakhstan, he won a gold medal in sprint at the 2011 Asian Winter Games, ahead of Alexandr Babenko.
