= Liu Xiaoting =

Chinese ski orienteer

Medal record

Women's Ski-orienteering

Representing China

Asian Games
Silver medal – second place	2011 Astana-Almaty	Sprint
Bronze medal – third place	2011 Astana-Almaty	Middle

Liu Xiaoting is a ski-orienteering competitor from China. She won two medals at the 2011 Asian Winter Games, including a silver medal in the sprint behind Olga Novikova, and a bronze medal in the middle distance, behind Novikova and Yevgeniya Kuzmina.
