= Cidan Yuzhen =

Chienese ski mountaineer (born 2006)

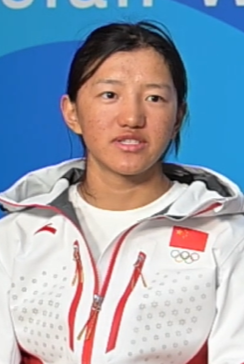
- Cidan in 2025

Personal information
- Born: 10 September 2006 (age 19) Lhünzê County, Tibet Autonomous Region, China

Sport
- Country: China
- Sport: Ski mountaineering
Medal record
Women's ski mountaineering
Representing China
Asian Winter Games
Gold medal – first place	2025 Harbin	Sprint race
Gold medal – first place	2025 Harbin	Mixed relay

Cidan Yuzhen (Tibetan: ཚེ་བརྟན་གཡུ་སྒྲོན།་, ZWPY: Tsetan Yuzhen; Chinese: 次旦玉珍 ; born 10 September 2006) is a Chinese ski mountaineer. She represented China at the 2026 Winter Olympics.

== Early life ==
Cidan was born in Lhünzê County and grew up in a farming and sheep herding family. She began her career as a race walker, before switching to ski mountaineering. She made her first national ski mountaineering team in 2020.

== Career ==
On 17 March 2024, Cidan won the ISMF Youth World Cup mixed relay, along with Bu Luer. This marked the first-ever victory for China in the mixed relay event at the Youth World Cup. She competed at the 2024 Asian Ski Mountaineering Championships and won gold medals in the vertical race, sprint race, individual race, and mixed relay. She represented China at the 2025 Asian Winter Games and won a gold medal in the sprint race with a time of 2:55.88. She also won a gold medal in the mixed relay, along with Bu, with a time of 27:48.67.

In January 2026, she was selected to represent China at the 2026 Winter Olympics.
