= Bu Luer =

Chienese ski mountaineer (born 2005)

Personal information
- Born: 21 December 2005 (age 20) Xinjiang, China

Sport
- Country: China
- Sport: Ski mountaineering
Medal record
Men's ski mountaineering
Representing China
Asian Winter Games
Gold medal – first place	2025 Harbin	Sprint race
Gold medal – first place	2025 Harbin	Mixed relay

Bu Luer (simplified Chinese: 布鲁尔; traditional Chinese: 布魯尔; pinyin: Bùlǔ'ěr; born 21 December 2005) is a Chinese ski mountaineer. He will represent China at the 2026 Winter Olympics.

== Career ==
On 17 March 2024, Bu won the ISMF Youth World Cup mixed relay, along with Cidan Yuzhen. This marked the first-ever victory for China in the mixed relay event at the Youth World Cup. He competed at the 2024 Asian Ski Mountaineering Championships and won gold medals in the vertical race, individual race, and mixed relay.

He represented China at the 2025 Asian Winter Games and won a gold medal in the sprint race with a time of 2:22.29. He also won a gold medal in the mixed relay, along with Cidan, with a time of 27:48.67. In January 2026, he was selected to represent China at the 2026 Winter Olympics.
