= Yu Jingxuan =

Chinese ski mountaineer (born 2003)

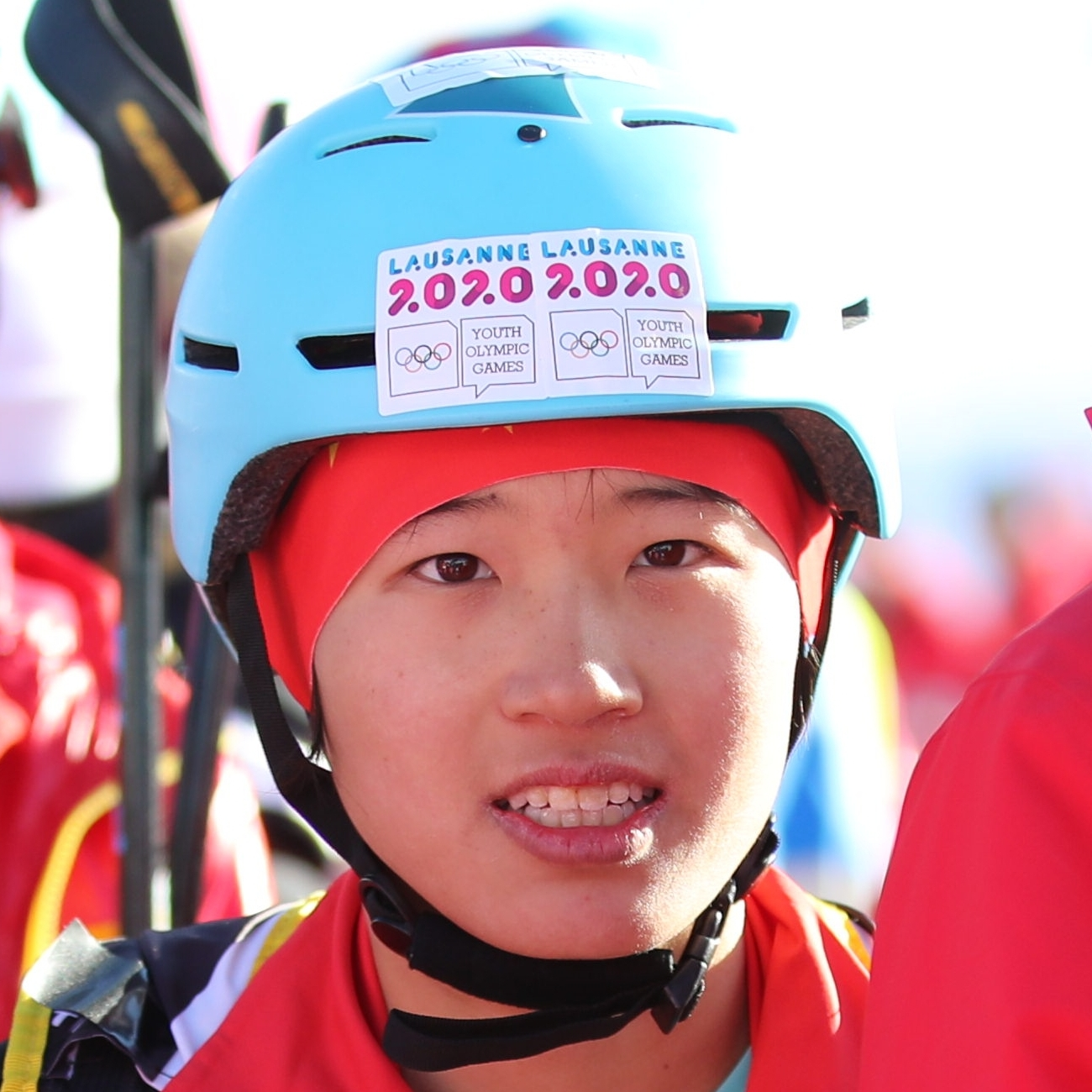
- Yu at the 2020 Winter Youth Olympics

Personal information
- Born: 10 February 2003 (age 23)

Sport
- Country: China
- Sport: Ski mountaineering
Medal record
Women's ski mountaineering
Representing China
Asian Winter Games
Silver medal – second place	2025 Harbin	Sprint race
Silver medal – second place	2025 Harbin	Mixed relay

Yu Jingxuan (born 10 February 2003) is a Chinese ski mountaineer.

== Career ==
Yu represented China at the 2025 Asian Winter Games and won a silver medal in the sprint race with a time of 2:59.84. She also won a bronze medal in the mixed relay, along with Bi Yuxin, with a time of 28:20.96.
