= Vitaliy Lilichenko =

Kazakhstani orienteer (born 1976)

Medal record

Men's Ski-orienteering

Representing Kazakhstan

Asian Games
Silver medal – second place	2011 Astana-Almaty	Middle

Vitaliy Lilichenko (born 13 February 1976) is a ski-orienteering competitor from Kazakhstan. He competed at the 2009 World Ski Orienteering Championships in Rusutsu, where he placed 30th in the sprint, 45th in the middle distance, 35th in the long distance, and 9th in the relay with the Kazakhstani team. He won a silver medal in the middle distance at the 2011 Asian Winter Games, behind Mikhail Sorokin.
