= Elmira Moldasheva =

Kazakhstani ski-orienteering competitor

Medal record

Women's Ski-orienteering

Representing Kazakhstan

World Military Games
Bronze medal – third place	2017 Sochi	Relay

Asian Games
Gold medal – first place	2011 Astana-Almaty	Relay

Elmira Moldasheva is a ski-orienteering competitor from Kazakhstan. She competed at the 2009 World Ski Orienteering Championships in Rusutsu, where she placed 30th in the sprint, 32nd in the middle distance, 30th in the long distance, and 7th in the relay with the Kazakhstani team. She won a gold medal in the relay at the 2011 Asian Winter Games.
