= Bayaraagiin Gerelt-Od =

Mongolian ski orienteer

Medal record

Men's ski-orienteering

Representing Mongolia

Asian Games
Bronze medal – third place	2011 Astana-Almaty	Sprint
Bronze medal – third place	2011 Astana-Almaty	Long
Bronze medal – third place	2011 Astana-Almaty	Relay

Bayaraagiin Gerelt-Od is a ski-orienteering competitor from Mongolia. At the 2011 Asian Winter Games, he won a bronze medal in the sprint, behind Mikhail Sorokin and Alexandr Babenko, and a bronze medal in the long distance behind Sorokin and Alexey Nemtsev.
