= Yevgeniya Kuzmina =

Kazakhstani ski-orienteering competitor

Medal record

Women's Ski-orienteering

Representing Kazakhstan

Asian Games
Gold medal – first place	2011 Astana-Almaty	Relay
Silver medal – second place	2011 Astana-Almaty	Middle
Silver medal – second place	2011 Astana-Almaty	Long
Bronze medal – third place	2011 Astana-Almaty	Sprint

Yevgeniya Kuzmina (born 9 August 1986) is a ski-orienteering competitor from Kazakhstan. She won four medals at the 2011 Asian Winter Games, including a gold medal in the relay, silver medals in the middle distance and the long distance, and a bronze medal in the sprint.
