= Alexey Nemtsev =

Kazakhstani ski-orienteer (born 1982)

Medal record

Men's Ski-orienteering

Representing Kazakhstan

Asian Games
Silver medal – second place	2011 Astana-Almaty	Long

Alexey Nemtsev (born 31 March 1982) is a ski-orienteering competitor from Kazakhstan. He competed at the 2009 World Ski Orienteering Championships in Rusutsu, where he placed 29th in the long distance, and 9th in the relay with the Kazakhstani team. He won a silver medal in the long distance at the 2011 Asian Winter Games, behind Mikhail Sorokin.
