= Hong Byung-sik =

South Korean biathlete (born 1969)

Personal information
- Nationality: South Korean
- Born: 15 October 1969 (age 55)

Sport
- Sport: Biathlon

Hong Byung-sik (born 15 October 1969) is a South Korean biathlete. He competed at the 1988 Winter Olympics and the 1992 Winter Olympics.
