= Bijan Kangarloo =

Canadian-Iranian cross-country skier

Medal record

Representing Iran

Men's ski orienteering

Asian Winter Games
Silver medal – second place	2011 Astana–Almaty	Relay
Bronze medal – third place	2011 Astana–Almaty	Middle distance

Bijan "Justin" Kangarloo (Persian: بيژن كنگرلو, born February 10, 1985, in Calgary, Alberta) is a Canadian-Iranian cross-country skier who has competed since 2003. Kangarloo was born in Calgary, Canada, to an Iranian father.
