= Saly Ou Moeut =

Cambodian jet skier

Personal information
- Nationality: Cambodian
- Born: 7 February 1992 (age 34) Phnom Penh, Cambodia
- Height: 166 cm (5 ft 5 in)
- Weight: 57 kg (126 lb)

Sport
- Country: Cambodia
Medal record
Representing Cambodia
Men's Jet ski
Asian Games
Gold medal – first place	2018 Jakarta	ski modified
Bronze medal – third place	2018 Jakarta	runabout 1100 stock
SEA Games
Gold medal – first place	2023 Phnom Penh	ski GP
Bronze medal – third place	2023 Phnom Penh	ski lite

Saly Ou Moeut (Khmer: សាលី អ៊ូមើត; born 7 February 1992) is a Cambodian male jet skier. He represented Cambodia at the 2018 Asian Games, which was also his first Asian Games event.

During the 2018 Asian Games, he became the first Cambodian male athlete to win an Asian Games gold medal and also became only the third overall Cambodian to win gold for Cambodia at the Asian Games history after striking gold in the men's ski modified event on 25 August. This was also the second gold medal for Cambodia during the 2018 Asiad following Jessa Khan who claimed gold in ju-jitsu on 24 August. Saly Ou Moeut also went onto claim a bronze in the men's runabout 1100 stock event, which eventually became the first bronze medal for Cambodia at the 2018 Asian Games.
