= Alexandr Babenko =

Kazakhstani ski-orienteer (born 1980)

Medal record

Men's Ski-orienteering

Representing Kazakhstan

Asian Games
Silver medal – second place	2011 Astana-Almaty	Sprint

Alexandr Babenko (born 25 March 1980) is a ski-orienteering competitor from Kazakhstan. He competed at the 2009 World Ski Orienteering Championships in Rusutsu, where he placed 40th in the sprint, 27th in the middle distance, 36th in the long distance, and 9th in the relay with the Kazakhstani team. He won a silver medal in sprint at the 2011 Asian Winter Games, behind Mikhail Sorokin.
