= Sattar Seid =

Iranian cross-country skier

Medal record

Representing Iran

Men's ski orienteering

Asian Winter Games
Silver medal – second place	2011 Astana–Almaty	Relay

Seyed Sattar Seid (Persian: سيد ستار صيد, born 26 November 1987 in Tehran) is an Iranian cross-country skier who has competed since 2007. He finished 89th in the 15 km event at the 2010 Winter Olympics in Vancouver. Seid would later compete at the Winter Olympic in 2014 and 2018.

In January 2022, Seid was named to his fourth Olympic team.

Seid has six victories in lesser events up to 10 km since 2009.
