= Chinbatyn Otgontsetseg =

Mongolian cross-country skier (born 1991)

Personal information
- Born: April 30, 1991 (age 35)

Sport
- Country: Mongolia
- Sport: Cross-country skiing

Chinbatyn Otgontsetseg (born April 30, 1991) is a cross-country skier competing for Mongolia. She competed for Mongolia at the 2014 Winter Olympics in the 10 kilometre classical race. She ended up placing in 70th place in a field of 76 competitors.

Otgontsetseg qualified for the 2018 Winter Olympics.
