= Mongolia at the 2011 Asian Winter Games =

- IOC code: MGL
- NOC: Mongolian National Olympic Committee

in Astana and Almaty
- Competitors: 52 in 8 sports
- Medals Ranked 5th: Gold 0 Silver 1 Bronze 4 Total 5

Asian Winter Games appearances
- 1986; 1990; 1996; 1999; 2003; 2007; 2011; 2017; 2025; 2029

Mongolia participated in the 2011 Asian Winter Games in Almaty and Astana, Kazakhstan from January 30, 2011 to February 6, 2011. The bandy team took Mongolia's first ever silver medal at Asian Winter Games. Mongolian competitors also won four bronze medals at the Winter Games for an overall haul of five medals.

== Alpine skiing ==
Men

Athlete	Event	Final	
Athlete	Event	Time	Rank
Ganzorig Sodbayar	Downhill	1:43.50	12
Ganzorig Sodbayar	Super-G	1:15.36	10
Ganzorig Sodbayar	Super combined	Did not finish	
Chagnaa Bayarzul	Downhill	Did not finish	
Chagnaa Bayarzul	Super-G	1:38.48	19
Chagnaa Bayarzul	Super combined	Disqualify	

Women

Athlete	Event	Final	
Athlete	Event	Time	Rank
Altanzul Ariunzaya	Downhill	Did not start	
Altanzul Ariunzaya	Super-G	1:52.37	9
Altanzul Ariunzaya	Super combined	Did not finish	
Jargalsuren Tugszaya	Super combined	Disqualify	

== Bandy ==
All times are Almaty Time (UTC+06:00)

=== Preliminaries ===
Team	Pld	W	D	L	GF	GA	GD	Pts
Kazakhstan	2	2	0	0	38	0	+38	6
Mongolia	2	1	0	1	17	19	−2	3
Kyrgyzstan	2	0	0	2	2	38	−36	0

2 February; 11:00	Kyrgyzstan	2 – 17 (0–13, 2–4)	Mongolia	Medeo, Almaty

Game reference

Elzar Bolotbekov
Goalies
Bayarsaikhany Mönkhbold
Bat-Erdeniin Chinzorig
Referee:
Sergey Gorbachev (RUS)

	0–1	01:01 – Negüün
	0–2	02:56 – Mungunkhuyag (Bayarsaikhan)
	0–3	03:39 – Bayarsaikhan
	0–4	06:02 – Myagmardorj (Bayarsaikhan)
	0–5	08:00 – Myagmardorj
	0–6	10:17 – Bayarsaikhan (Mungunkhuyag)
	0–7	12:06 – Bayarsaikhan
	0–8	17:03 – Negüün
	0–9	23:22 – Shinebayar
	0–10	24:09 – Negüün
	0–11	34:33 – Mungunkhuyag (Shinebayar)
	0–12	37:55 – Bayarsaikhan
	0–13	41:57 – Negüün
Tynymseitov (Zhumataev) – 52:30	1–13
	1–14	53:26 – Bayarsaikhan
	1–15	56:44 – Shinebayar (Bayarsaikhan)
	1–16	63:22 – Shinebayar
	1–17	72:27 – Negüün
Tynymseitov (Zhumataev) – 87:00	2–17

0 min
Penalties
0 min
16
Shots
46

3 February; 11:00	Kazakhstan	21 – 0 (9–0, 10–0, 2–0)	Kyrgyzstan	Medeo, Almaty

Game reference

Nariman Takirov
Ilyas Khairekishev
Goalies
Elzar Bolotbekov
Referee:
Vyacheslav Kurbanov (RUS)

Issaliyev (Novozhilov) – 00:57	1–0
Nugmanov (Issaliyev) – 03:30	2–0
Issaliyev – 05:18	3–0
Nugmanov – 13:47	4–0
Issaliyev – 14:21	5–0
Larionov – 16:19	6–0
Alipkaliyev – 17:47	7–0
Alipkaliyev – 24:27	8–0
Issaliyev – 25:14	9–0
Issaliyev – 31:32	10–0
Nugmanov – 32:31	11–0
Nugmanov – 33:52	12–0
Tokmakov – 34:46	13–0
Issaliyev – 42:17	14–0
Gribanov – 43:33	15–0
Larionov – 45:59	16–0
Issaliyev – 46:43	17–0
Nugmanov – 47:23	18–0
Alipkaliyev – 48:40	19–0
Kadirzhanov (Issaliyev) – 70:49	20–0
Issaliyev – 89:38	21–0

0 min
Penalties
0 min
66
Shots
0

4 February; 11:00	Mongolia	0 – 17 (0–9, 0–8)	Kazakhstan	Medeo, Almaty

Game reference

Bayarsaikhany Mönkhbold
Goalies
Ilyas Khairekishev
Referee:
Vyacheslav Kurbanov (RUS)

0–1	04:27 – Issaliyev (Shavaldin)
0–2	06:48 – Nugmanov
0–3	10:13 – Issaliyev (Gribanov)
0–4	14:59 – Temirgaliyev
0–5	21:49 – Issaliyev (Gribanov)
0–6	27:51 – Nugmanov (Issaliyev)
0–7	29:10 – Issaliyev
0–8	36:34 – Issaliyev
0–9	40:15 – Novozhilov (Shavaldin)
0–10	48:22 – Nugmanov
0–11	49:59 – Issaliyev
0–12	58:17 – Nugmanov
0–13	65:43 – Issaliyev
0–14	72:33 – Issaliyev
0–15	76:14 – Issaliyev (Amanshin)
0–16	78:44 – Kazybayev
0–17	+92:01 – Issaliyev

20 min
Penalties
40 min
5
Shots
52

=== Final ===
6 February; 11:00	Kazakhstan	16 – 2 (7–0, 9–2)	Mongolia	Medeo, Almaty

Game reference

Ilyas Khairekishev
Goalies
Bayarsaikhany Mönkhbold
Referee:
Sergey Gorbachev (RUS)

Issaliyev (Nugmanov) – 01:56	1–0
Shavaldin – 04:42	2–0
Novozhilov (Shavaldin) – 07:49	3–0
Issaliyev – 11:18	4–0
Issaliyev (Temirgaliyev) – 19:38	5–0
Shavaldin (Issaliyev) – 21:27	6–0
Gribanov – +49:37	7–0
Novozhilov (Nugmanov) – 45:41	8–0
Nugmanov (Issaliyev) – 48:56	9–0
	9–1	57:12 – Gan-Ochir
Suyetnov (Issaliyev) – 61:19	10–1
Novozhilov (Issaliyev) – 62:59	11–1
Novozhilov – 68:16	12–1
Gribanov – 71:42	13–1
	13–2	74:39 – Gan-Ochir
Nugmanov – 83:56	14–2
Issaliyev (Karmak) – 89:13	15–2
Issaliyev (Shavaldin) – +90:18	16–2

90 min
Penalties
95 min
50
Shots
9

== Figure skating ==
Women

Athlete(s)	Event	SP/SP		FS/LP		Total	
Athlete(s)	Event	Points	Rank	Points	Rank	Points	Rank
Maral-Erdene Gansukh	Women's	19.09	17	41.25	16	60.34	16

== Freestyle skiing ==
Men

Athlete	Event	Qualification		Final	
Athlete	Event	Score	Rank	Score	Rank
Ganzorigiin Sodbayar	Aerials	Did not start			
Temuulen Sumiyasuren	Moguls	0.54	9	Did not qualify	
Chagnaagiin Aranzalzul	Moguls	Did not finish		Did not qualify	

Women

Athlete	Event	Qualification		Final	
Athlete	Event	Score	Rank	Score	Rank
Jargalsuren Tugszaya	Aerials	Did not start			
Jargalsuren Tugszaya	Moguls	Did not start			
Altanzul Ariunzaya	Aerials	Did not start			
Altanzul Ariunzaya	Moguls	Did not start			

== Ice hockey ==
Men

The Mongolian team is in the premier division for these games. The roster consists of 21 athletes.

=== Premier Division ===
Team	GP	W	OTW	OTL	L	GF	GA	DIF	PTS
United Arab Emirates	0	0	0	0	0	0	0	0	0
Thailand	0	0	0	0	0	0	0	0	0
Malaysia	0	0	0	0	0	0	0	0	0
Mongolia	0	0	0	0	0	0	0	0	0
Kuwait	0	0	0	0	0	0	0	0	0
Kyrgyzstan	0	0	0	0	0	0	0	0	0
Bahrain	0	0	0	0	0	0	0	0	0

All times are local (UTC+6).

January 28, 2011; 20:30	Mongolia	v	Kuwait	Kazakhstan Sports Palace (Arena 2)

January 31, 2011; 17:00	Mongolia	v	Kyrgyzstan	Kazakhstan Sports Palace (Arena 2)

February 1, 2011; 17:00	Bahrain	v	Mongolia	Kazakhstan Sports Palace (Arena 2)

February 2, 2011; 17:00	United Arab Emirates	v	Mongolia	Kazakhstan Sports Palace (Arena 2)

February 4, 2011; 17:00	Mongolia	v	Thailand	Kazakhstan Sports Palace (Arena 2)

February 5, 2011; 17:00	Malaysia	v	Mongolia	Kazakhstan Sports Palace (Arena 2)

== Ski orienteering ==
Mongolia will send a ski orienteering team.

Men

- Gerelt-Od Bayaraa
- Byambadorj Bold
- Barkhuu Erdenechimeg

Women

- Narantsetseg Altantsetseg
- Otgontsetseg Chinbat
- Uugantsetseg Nandintsetseg

== Short track speed skating ==
Men

- Munkh-Amidral Ganbat

Women

- Amarzaya Otgonbayar

== Speed skating ==
Men

- Belgutei Galbaatar
- Uuganbaatar Galbaatar

Women

- Delgermaa Dalanbayar
